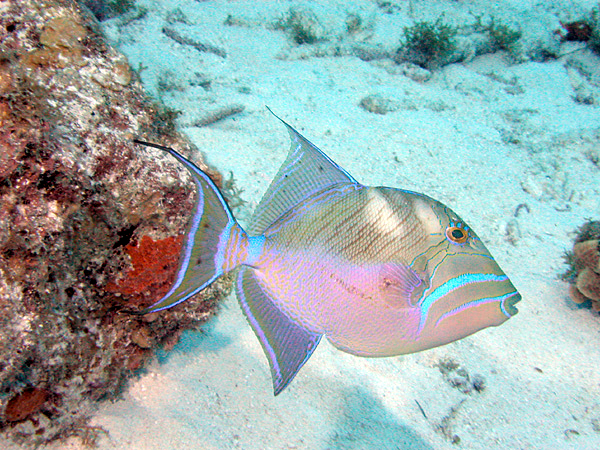
- Balistes vetula

Scientific classification
- Kingdom: Animalia
- Phylum: Chordata
- Class: Actinopterygii
- Division: Teleostei
- Order: Tetraodontiformes
- Family: Balistidae
- Genus: Balistes; Linnaeus, 1758

Type species
- Balistes vetula Linnaeus, 1758

Synonyms
- List: Ballistes Billberg, 1833; Capriscus Artedi, in Röse, 1793; Capriscus Rafinesque, 1810; Nematobalistes Fraser-Brunner, 1935; Verrunculus D. S. Jordan, 1924

= Balistes =

Balistes Temporal range: Late Oligocene to present

Genus of fishes

Balistes is a genus of marine ray-finned fishes belonging to the family Balistidae, the triggerfishes. The triggerfishes in this genus are found in the Atlantic and eastern Pacific Ocean.

== Taxonomy ==
Balistes was first proposed as a genus by Carl Linnaeus in the 10th edition of Systema Naturae publishes in 1758. In 1865 Pieter Bleeker designated Balistes veluta as the type species of the genus. When he described B. veluta Linnaeus gave its type locality as Ascension Island. This genus is the type genus of the family Balistidae, which is classified in the suborder Balistoidei in the order Tetraodontiformes.

A 2016 study found that Balistes was non-monophyletic and stated that moving Pseudobalistes naufragium to Balistes naufragium while also moving Balistoides viridescens to Pseudobalistes viridescens results in Balistes, Balistoides and Pseudobalistes being monophyletic.

== Etymology ==
Balistes triggerfishes have both a common name and a scientific name that refers to the first spine of the dorsal fin being locked in place by the erection of the shorter second trigger spine, and unlocked by depressing the second spine. Balistes is taken directly from the Italian pesca ballista, the "crossbow fish". Ballista originally being a machine for throwing arrows.

== Species ==
Balistes contains the following four valid extant species;

Image	Scientific name	Common name	Distribution
	Balistes capriscus J. F. Gmelin, 1789	grey triggerfish	western Atlantic from Nova Scotia to Argentina and also the eastern Atlantic, the Mediterranean Sea and off Angola on the west coast of Africa.
	Balistes polylepis Steindachner, 1876	finescale triggerfish	Pacific Coast of the Americas from San Francisco southwards to Callao, Peru and the Galapagos.
	Balistes punctatus J. F. Gmelin, 1789	bluespotted triggerfish	Eastern Atlantic.
	Balistes vetula Linnaeus, 1758	queen triggerfish	Western Atlantic, it ranges from Canada to southern Brazil, and in the eastern Atlantic it is found at Ascension, Cape Verde, Azores and south to Angola

=== Fossil species ===
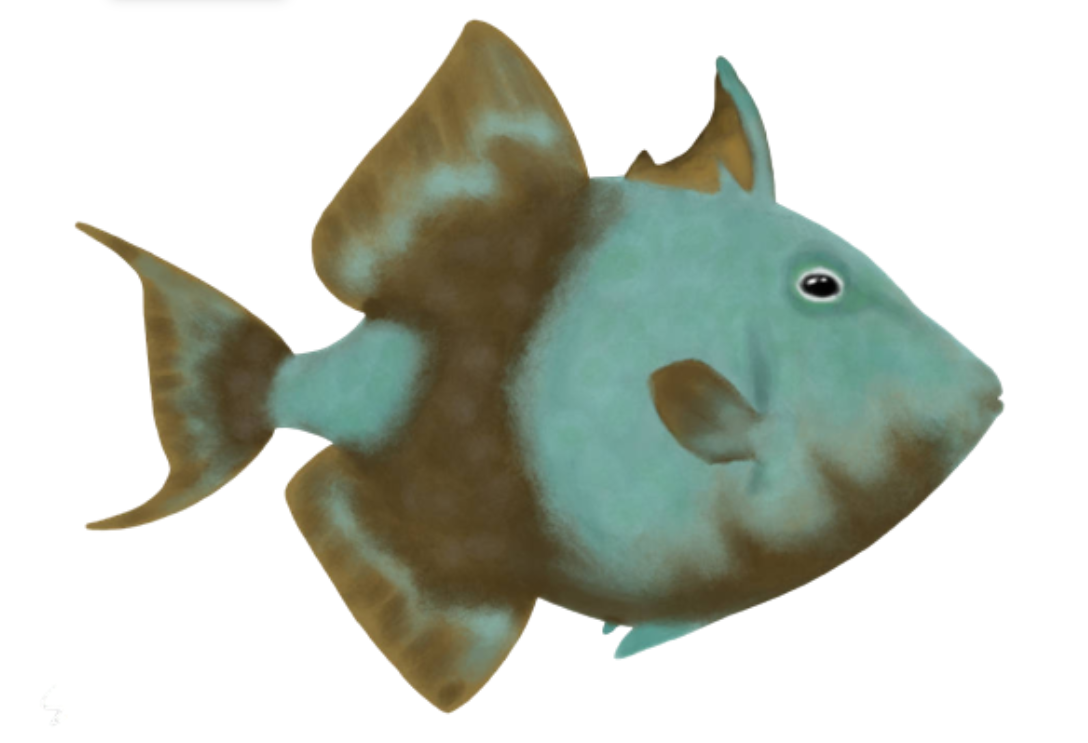
Life restoration of the extinct B. dubius.

The following fossil species are known:

- †Balistes crassidens Casier, 1958 (Early to Late Miocene of Trinidad & Cuba)
- †Balistes dubius (Münster, 1846) (Middle Miocene of Austria, Slovakia & the Czech Republic) (=Balistes muensteri Schultz, 2004)
- †Balistes lerichei Bauzá-Rullán, 1949 (Miocene of Spain, including Mallorca)
- †Balistes lopezi Mendiola & Martinez, 2003 (Late Miocene of Spain)
- †Balistes procapriscus Arambourg, 1927 (Late Miocene of Algeria)
- †Balistes vegai Lopez, Carr & Lorenzo, 2019 (Late Miocene of Cuba)

Indeterminate remains are known from the Late Oligocene of Florida (US), the Early Miocene of Cuba, the Early Miocene of Costa Rica, the Early Miocene of Indonesia (Tonasa Formation from South Sulawesi), the Middle Miocene of Poland, and the Late Miocene of Venezuela.

B. crassidens and B. vegai, both known from fossilized teeth from the Miocene of the Caribbean, were very large species that may have reached up to 1.8 metres (5.9 ft) total length, making them much larger than any living members of the family and the largest triggerfish known to have existed. The ecosystems they inhabited may have been more productive during this time period, allowing these species to reach such large sizes.

== Characteristics ==
Balistes triggerfishes have robust, rather deep, compressed, oblong-shaped bodies. There is a clear groove which runs from below the eye to just above the nostril and a small, front opening mouth which contains strong jaws, There are 8 large outer teeth on each jaw while the teeth on the side of the jaw are notched with the largest side teeth in the centre. The gill slit is short and located in front of the base of the pectoral fin, The dorsal fin has 3 spines, the first spine is lockable in the erect position, the second spine is half the length of the first. The soft rays in the dorsal, anal and pectoral fins are branched. The caudal peduncle is laterally compressed and has no spines, tubercles or ridges on it. The pelvic fins are vestigial and consist of four scales forming a case for the end of the pelvis The skin is thick and leathery with plate-like scales that are arranged in regular diagonal rows. The snout is completely covered in scales. The large, bony scales behind the gill slit form a tympanum. The lateral line is difficult to discern. These are moderately large fishes with the largest species being the finescale triggerfish (B. polylepis) with a maximum published total length of 76 cm (30 in).

== Distribution and habitat ==
Balistes triggerfishes are found in the Atlantic Ocean and the Eastern Pacific Ocean, with three species, the grey triggerfish, bluespotted triggerfish and the queen triggerfish, in the Eastern Atlantic. Two of the Eastern Atlantic species, the grey and the queen triggerfishes, are also found in the Western Atlantic, and one species, the fine spotted triggerfish in the Eastern Pacific. If the stone triggerfish is included then this is also found in the Eastern Pacific Ocean. These fishes are found at depths between 0 and 200 m (0 and 656 ft) in coastal waters.
