= Bluethroat triggerfish =

Bluethroat triggerfish or blue-throated triggerfish may refer to:

- Sufflamen albicaudatum, native to the western Indian Ocean, primarily in waters surrounding the Arabian Peninsula
- Sufflamen chrysopterum, native to the tropical Indian Ocean and west Pacific Ocean
- Xanthichthys auromarginatus, native to the Indian Ocean and central and western Pacific Ocean
