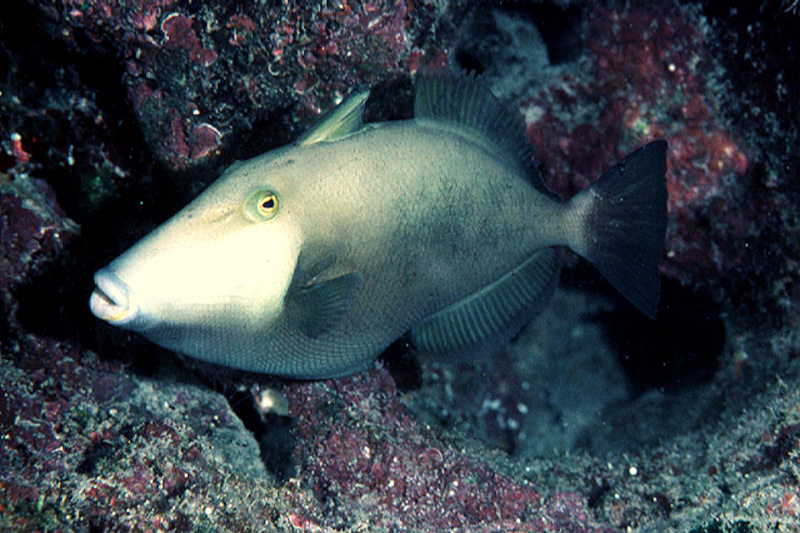

Conservation status
- Least Concern (IUCN 3.1)

Scientific classification
- Kingdom: Animalia
- Phylum: Chordata
- Class: Actinopterygii
- Division: Teleostei
- Order: Tetraodontiformes
- Family: Balistidae
- Genus: Sufflamen
- Species: S. fraenatum

Binomial name
- Sufflamen fraenatum (C. H. Gilbert & Starks, 1804)

= Masked triggerfish =

Species of fish

The masked triggerfish (Sufflamen fraenatum) is a species of triggerfish usually found living in coastal reefs or in lagoons. The range of depths where these triggerfish can live varies from 8 to 186 m (30 to 610 ft).

They are found along the Indian Ocean coast of Africa and throughout much of the Indo-Pacific region from Indonesia to the Hawaiian Islands.
