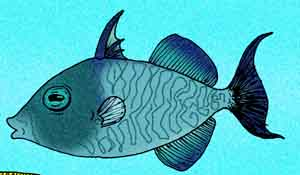
- Artist's reconstruction

Scientific classification
- Kingdom: Animalia
- Phylum: Chordata
- Class: Actinopterygii
- Order: Tetraodontiformes
- Family: Balistidae
- Genus: †Oligobalistes; Tyler & Santini, 2002
- Species: †O. robustus

Binomial name
- †Oligobalistes robustus Tyler & Santini, 2002

= Oligobalistes =

Oligobalistes Temporal range: Early Oligocene

Extinct genus of triggerfish

Oligobalistes robustus is an extinct prehistoric triggerfish that lived during the Rupelian of the Middle Oligocene epoch of Central Europe.

== See also ==
- Prehistoric fish
- List of prehistoric bony fish
