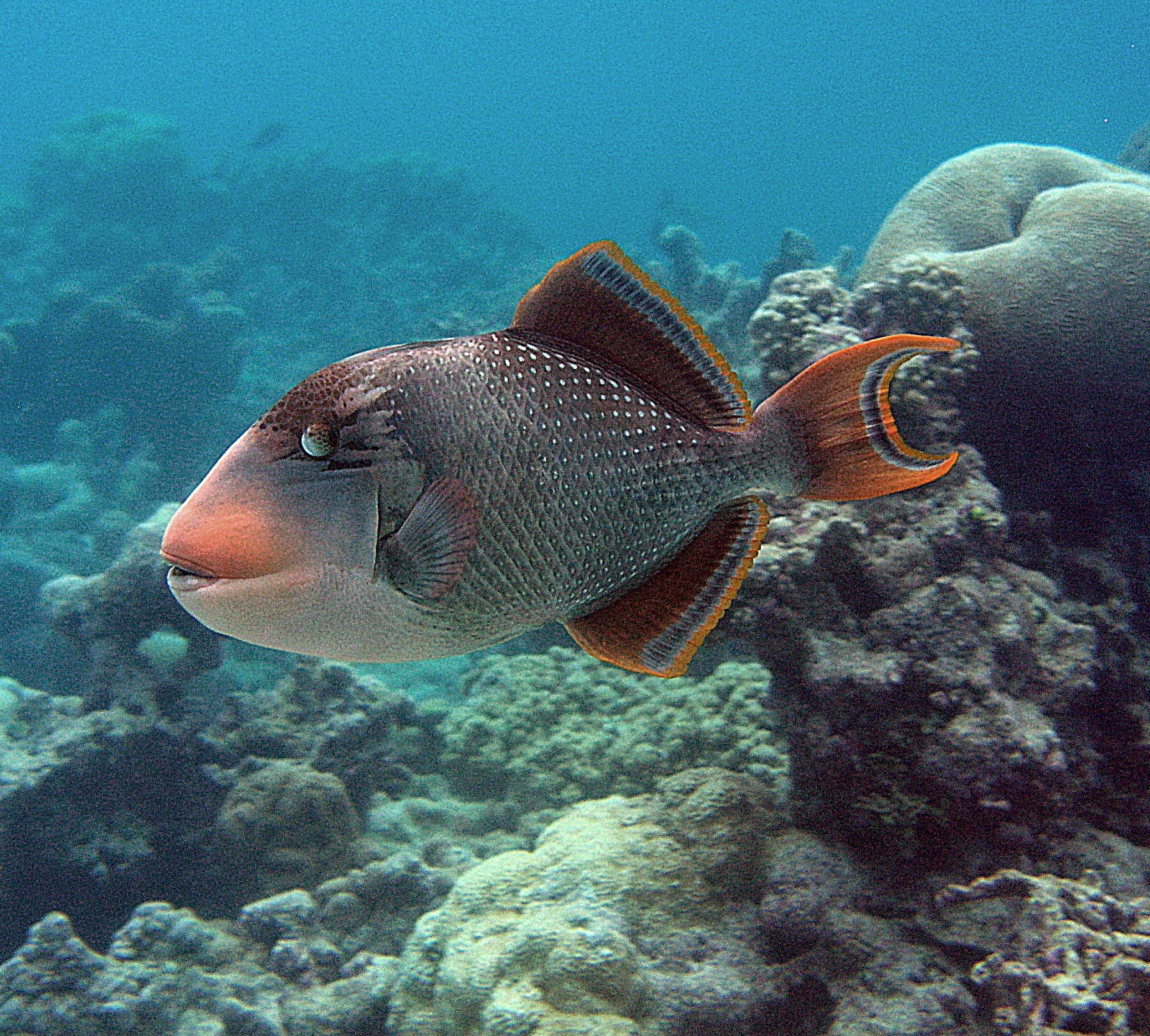

Scientific classification
- Kingdom: Animalia
- Phylum: Chordata
- Class: Actinopterygii
- Order: Tetraodontiformes
- Family: Balistidae
- Genus: Pseudobalistes
- Species: P. flavimarginatus

Binomial name
- Pseudobalistes flavimarginatus (Rüppell, 1829)

Synonyms
- Balistes flavimarginatus Rüppell, 1829; Pseudobalistes flavomarginatus (Rüppell, 1829)

= Yellowmargin triggerfish =

Species of fish

The yellowmargin triggerfish, pineapple trigger, yellowface triggerfish or yellow-face triggerfish (Pseudobalistes flavimarginatus) is a marine fish in the family Balistidae. It is found in coastal tropical waters and reefs of the Indo-Pacific from the Red Sea south to Natal, South Africa and east from southern Japan south to Indonesia, the Philippines and Samoa, at water depths from 2–50 m (6.6–164.0 ft).

This triggerfish can grow to a maximum length of 60 cm (24 in). They are marketed either fresh or dried for food, but are potentially dangerous in some areas due to ciguatera poisoning.

The yellowmargin triggerfish is oviparous, spawning in pairs. The female fish guards the nests aggressively. When not mating, this fish is solitary or may remain in pairs.

== Gallery ==
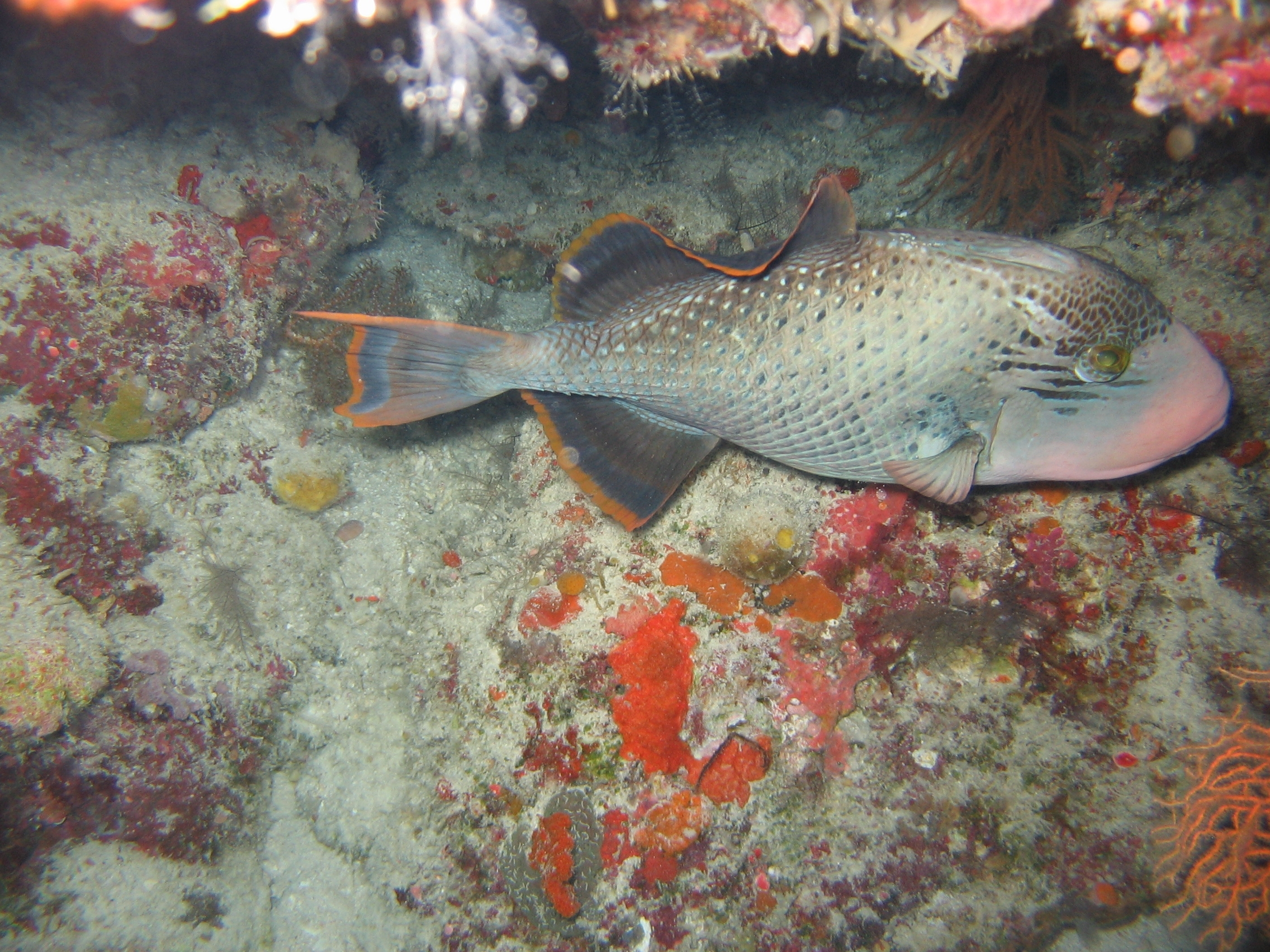
At Apo Reef, Philippines

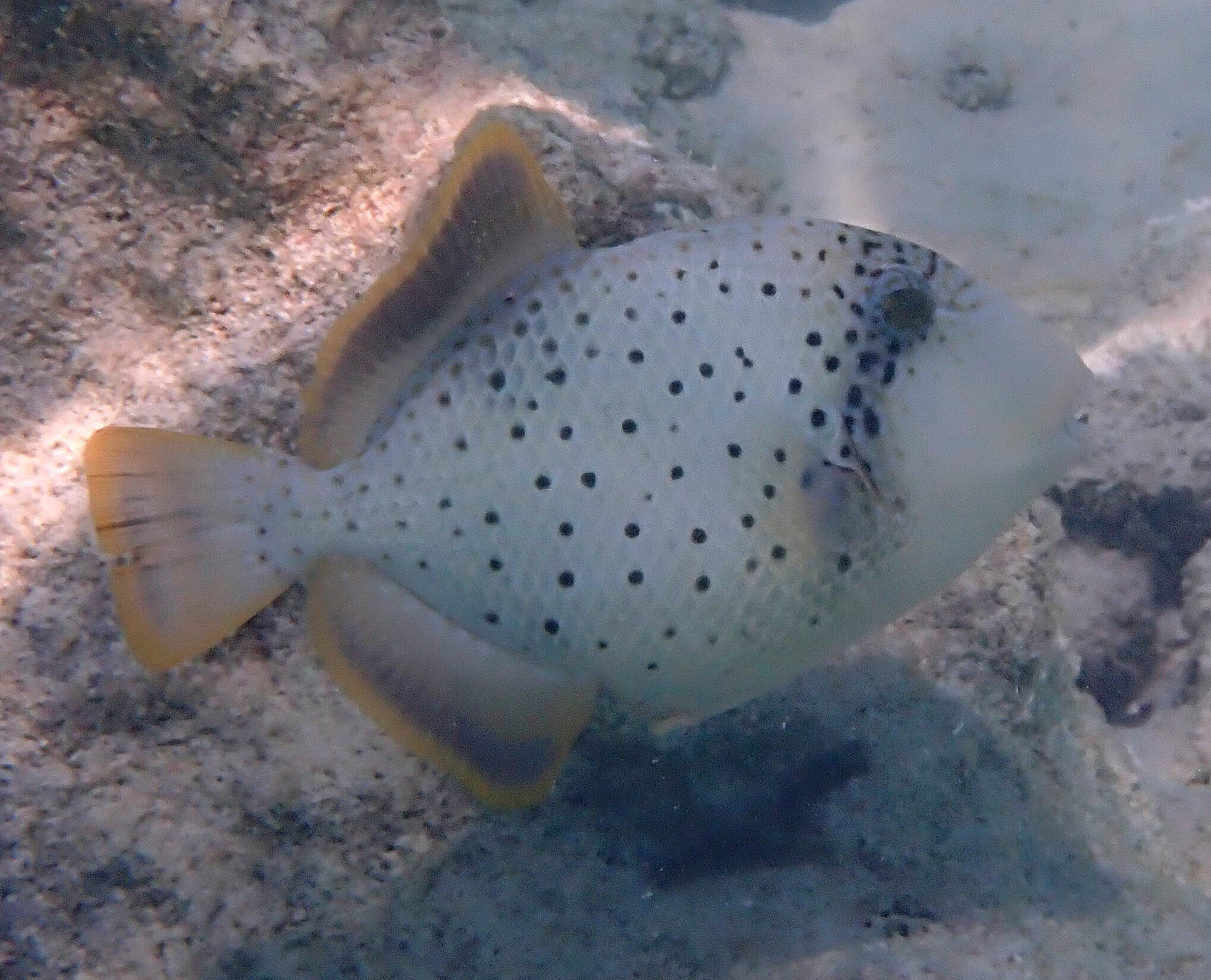
In the Maldives

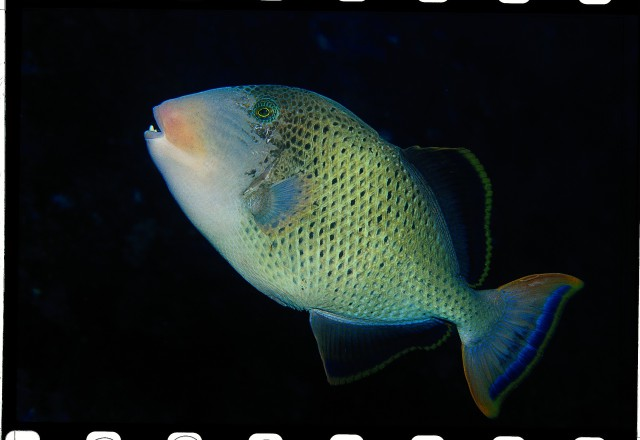

== See also ==
- List of marine aquarium fish species
