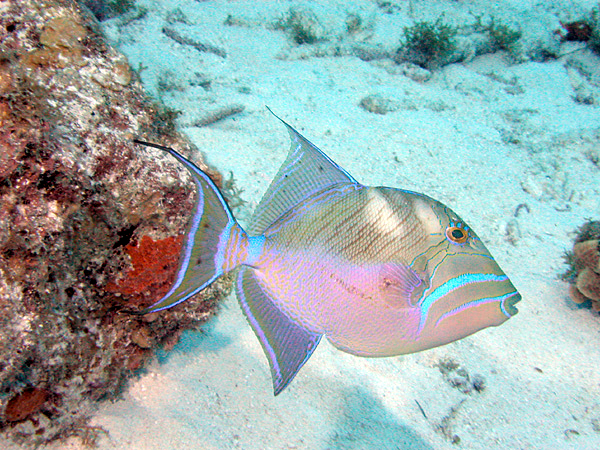
- Queen triggerfish (Balistes vetula)
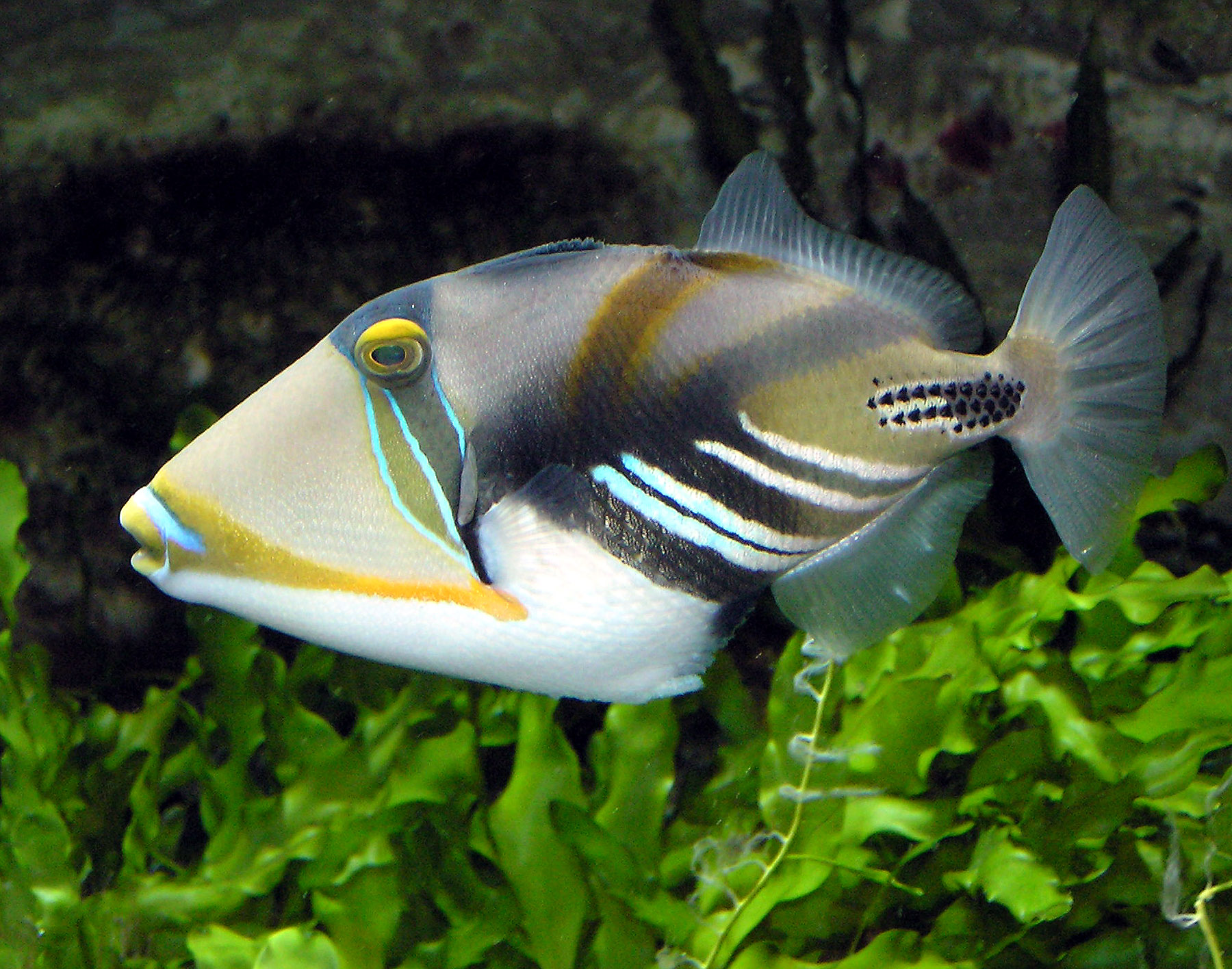
- Lagoon triggerfish (Rhinecanthus aculeatus)

Scientific classification
- Kingdom: Animalia
- Phylum: Chordata
- Class: Actinopterygii
- Division: Teleostei
- Order: Tetraodontiformes
- Suborder: Balistoidei
- Family: Balistidae; A. Risso, 1810

Genera
- See text

= Triggerfish =

Triggerfish Temporal range: Middle Eocene to present

Family of ray-finned fishes

Triggerfish are one of 41 species of marine, ray-finned fishes belonging to the family Balistidae. Often brightly colored and marked by lines and spots, they inhabit tropical and subtropical oceans throughout the world, with the greatest species richness in the Indo-Pacific. Most are found in relatively shallow, coastal habitats, especially at coral reefs, but a few, such as the oceanic triggerfish (Canthidermis maculata), are pelagic, inhabiting the open ocean.

Fish of this family are sometimes eaten by humans. While several triggerfish species are popular in the marine aquarium trade, they are often notoriously ill-tempered.

== Description ==
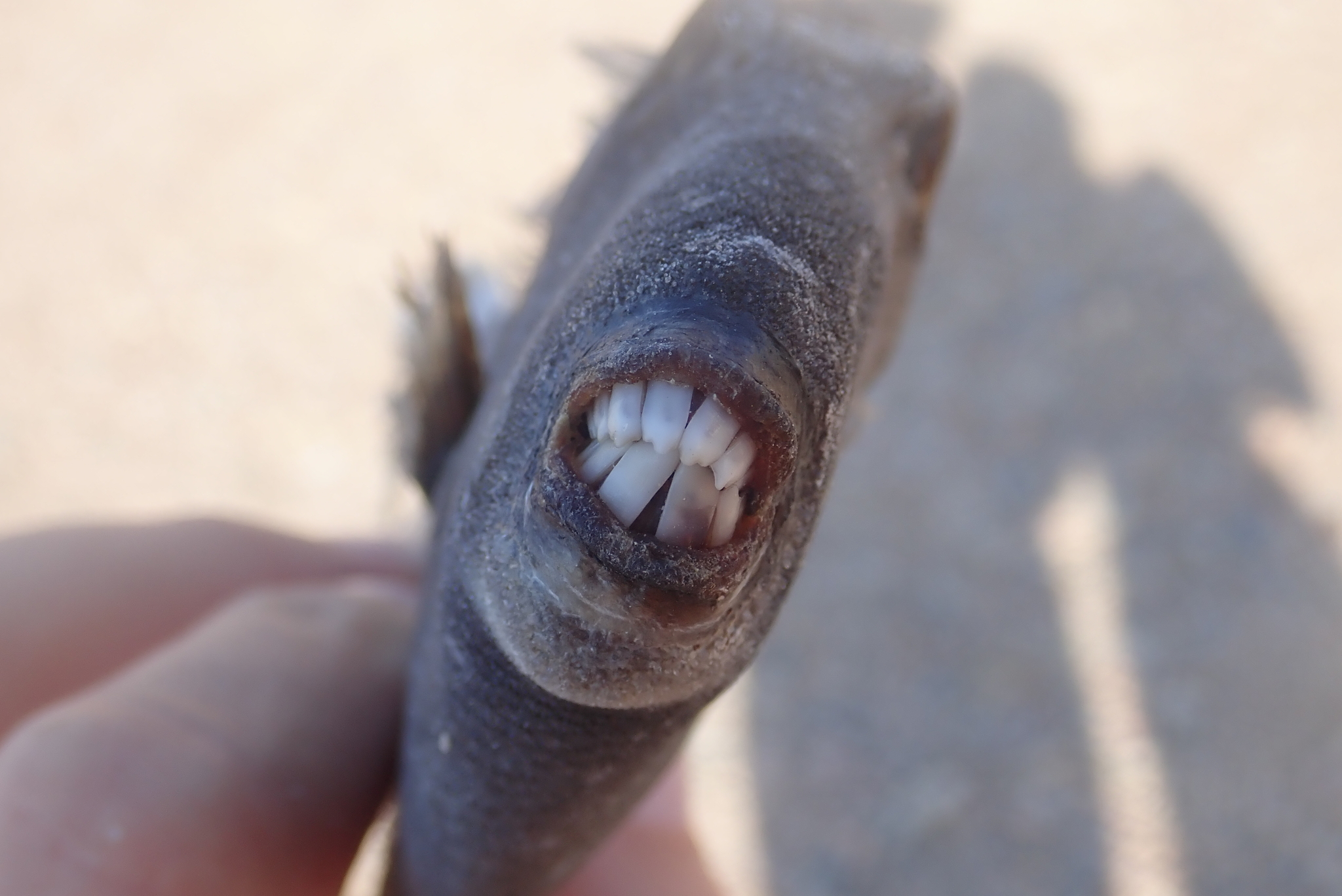
Teeth of a bluethroat triggerfish (Sufflamen albicaudatum)

Triggerfish have an oval-shaped, highly compressed body. The head is large, terminating in a small but strong-jawed mouth with teeth adapted for crushing shells (durophagy). Each jaw contains a row of four teeth on either side, while the upper jaw contains an additional set of six plate-like pharyngeal teeth. The eyes are small and set far back from the mouth, towards the top of the head. The gill plates (opercula), although present, are also not visible; they are overlaid by tough skin covered with rough, rhomboid scales that form a stout armor on their bodies. The only gill opening is a vertical slit, directly above the pectoral fins. Their small, restricted gill openings are a trait shared with other Tetraodontiformes.

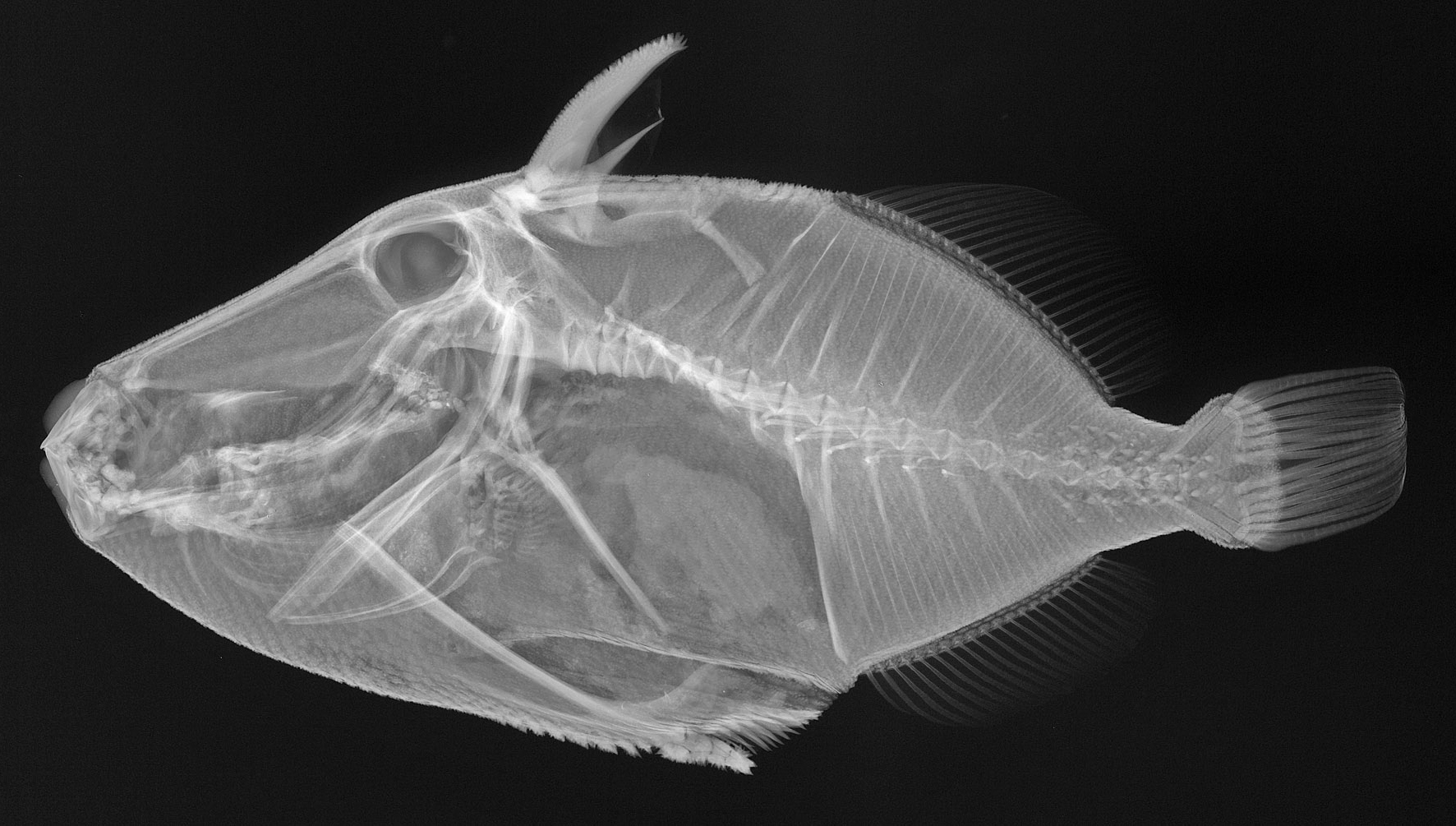
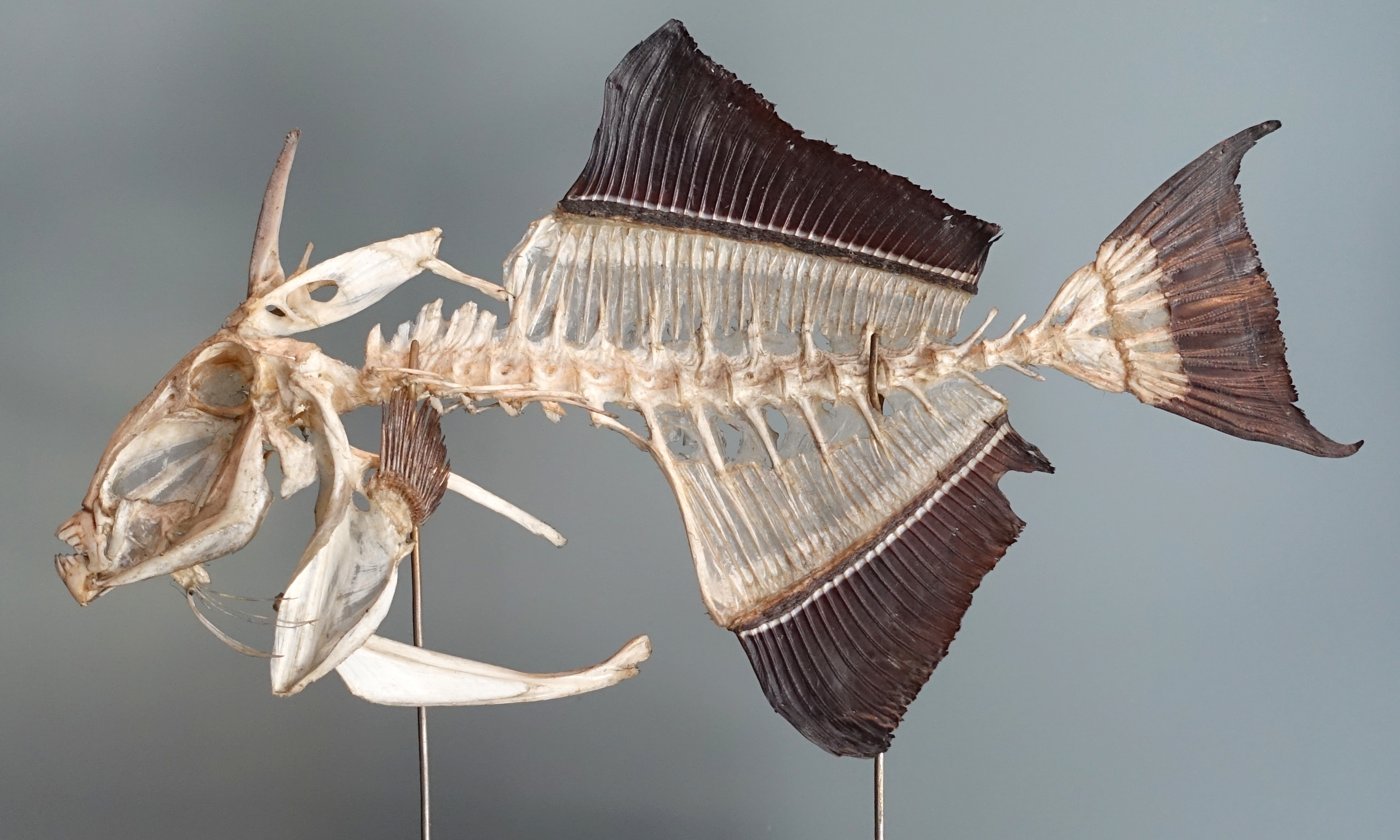
Skeletal anatomy of Rhinecanthus rectangulus (top) and Balistes capriscus (bottom)

The anterior dorsal fin is reduced to a set of three spines, with the first spine being stout and by far the longest. All three are normally retracted into a groove. As a protection against predators, triggerfish can erect the first two dorsal spines; the first (anterior) spine is locked in place by erection of the short second spine, and can be unlocked only by depressing the second, "trigger" spine, hence the family name "triggerfish". This locking mechanism allows these fish to anchor themselves within crevices.

Characteristic of the order Tetraodontiformes, the anal and posterior dorsal fins are capable of undulating from side to side to provide slow movement and comprise their primary mode of propulsion, using a method called balistiform locomotion. The sickle-shaped caudal fin is used for faster swimming, such as when evading predators. The two pelvic fins are overlaid by skin for most of their length and fused to form a single spine, terminated by very short rays, their only external evidence.

With the exception of a few species from the genus Xanthichthys, the sexes of all species in this family are similar in appearance, with little sexual dimorphism.

The largest member of the family, the stone triggerfish (Pseudobalistes naufragium), reaches 1 m (3.3 ft), but most species have a maximum length between 20 and 50 cm (8–20 in). Triggerfish appear to have grown to even larger sizes in prehistory, with the extinct Balistes crassidens and Balistes vegai, both fossil species from the Miocene of the Caribbean, potentially reaching up to 1.8 metres (5.9 ft), making them the largest triggerfishes known to have ever existed.

== Nomenclature ==
The triggerfish family, Balistidae, was first proposed in 1810 by French polymath Constantine Samuel Rafinesque. The closest relatives to the triggerfishes are the filefishes belonging to the family Monacanthidae, and these two families are sometimes classified together in the suborder Balistoidei, for example in the 5th edition of Fishes of the World. Other authorities, however, also include the families Aracanidae and Ostraciidae within the suborder Balistoidei.

=== Etymology ===
The triggerfish family has both a common name and a scientific name that refers to the first spine of the dorsal fin being locked in place by the erection of the shorter second trigger spine, and unlocked by depressing the second spine. The type genus Balistes is taken directly from their Italian name pesce balestra, the "crossbow fish"; this references the ballista, a siege engine resembling an oversized crossbow which possesses a trigger mechanism.

=== Genera and species ===
Image	Genus	Living species
	Abalistes D. S. Jordan & Seale, 1906	Abalistes filamentosus Matsuura & Yoshino, 2004; Abalistes stellatus Anonymous, referred to Lacépède, 1798
	Balistapus Tilesius, 1820	Balistapus undulatus M. Park, 1797
	Balistes Linnaeus, 1758	Balistes capriscus J. F. Gmelin, 1789; Balistes polylepis Steindachner, 1876; Balistes punctatus J. F. Gmelin, 1789; Balistes vetula Linnaeus, 1758
	Balistoides Fraser-Brunner, 1935	Balistoides conspicillum (Bloch & Schneider, 1801); Balistoides viridescens (Bloch & Schneider, 1801)
	Canthidermis Swainson, 1839	Canthidermis macrolepis Boulenger, 1888; Canthidermis maculata Bloch, 1786; Canthidermis rotundatus (Marion de Procé, 1822); Canthidermis sufflamen Mitchill, 1815; Canthidermis willughbeii (Lay & Bennett, 1839)
	Melichthys Swainson, 1839	Melichthys indicus J. E. Randall & Klausewitz, 1973; Melichthys niger Bloch, 1786; Melichthys vidua J. Richardson, 1845
	Odonus Gistel, 1848	Odonus niger Rüppell, 1836
	Pseudobalistes Bleeker, 1865	Pseudobalistes flavomarginatus Rüppell, 1829; Pseudobalistes fuscus (Bloch & Schneider, 1801); Pseudobalistes naufragium D. S. Jordan & Starks, 1895
	Rhinecanthus Swainson, 1839	Rhinecanthus abyssus Matsuura & Shiobara, 1989; Rhinecanthus aculeatus Linnaeus, 1758; Rhinecanthus assasi Forsskål, 1775; Rhinecanthus cinereus Bonnaterre, 1788; Rhinecanthus lunula J. E. Randall & Steene, 1983; Rhinecanthus rectangulus Bloch & Schneider, 1801; Rhinecanthus verrucosus Linnaeus, 1758
	Sufflamen D. S. Jordan, 1916	Sufflamen albicaudatum Rüppell, 1829; Sufflamen bursa Bloch & Schneider, 1801; Sufflamen chrysopterum Bloch & Schneider, 1801; Sufflamen fraenatum Latreille, 1804; Sufflamen verres C. H. Gilbert & Starks, 1904
	Xanthichthys Kaup, 1856	Xanthichthys auromarginatus Bennett, 1832; Xanthichthys caeruleolineatus J. E. Randall, Matsuura & Zama, 1978; Xanthichthys greenei Pyle & Earle, 2013; Xanthichthys lima (Bennett, 1832); Xanthichthys lineopunctatus Hollard, 1854; Xanthichthys mento D. S. Jordan & C. H. Gilbert, 1882; Xanthichthys ringens Linnaeus, 1758
	Xenobalistes Matsuura, 1981	Xenobalistes tumidipectoris Matsuura, 1981

The following cladogram is based on a 2016 molecular study of filefish and triggerfish (Balistoidea):

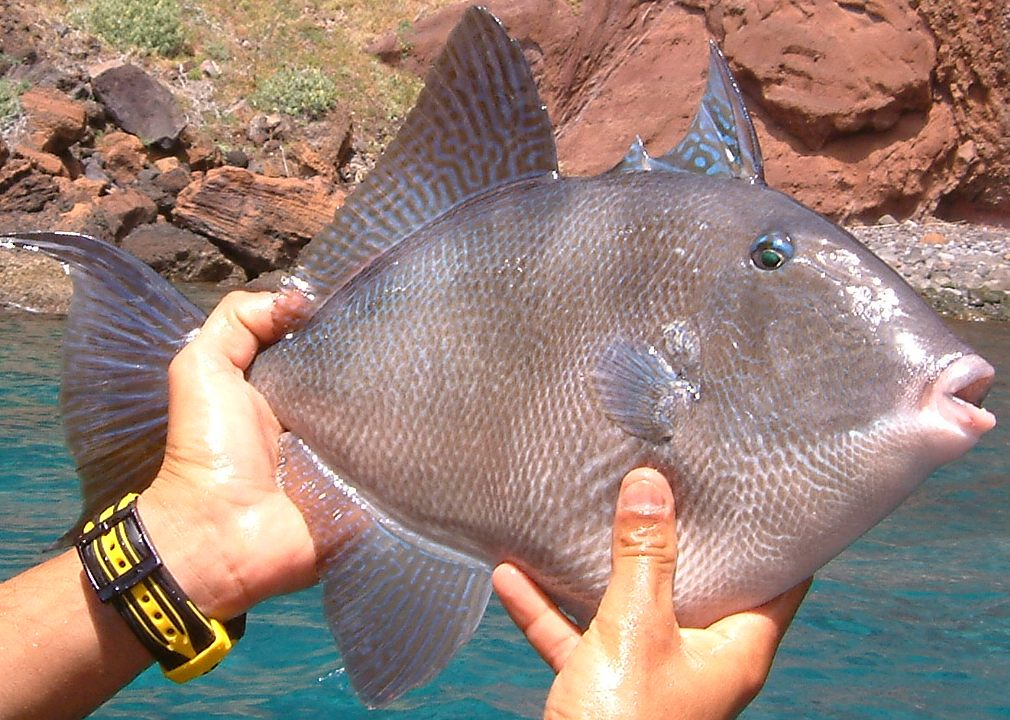
Grey triggerfish (Balistes capriscus) are caught for food

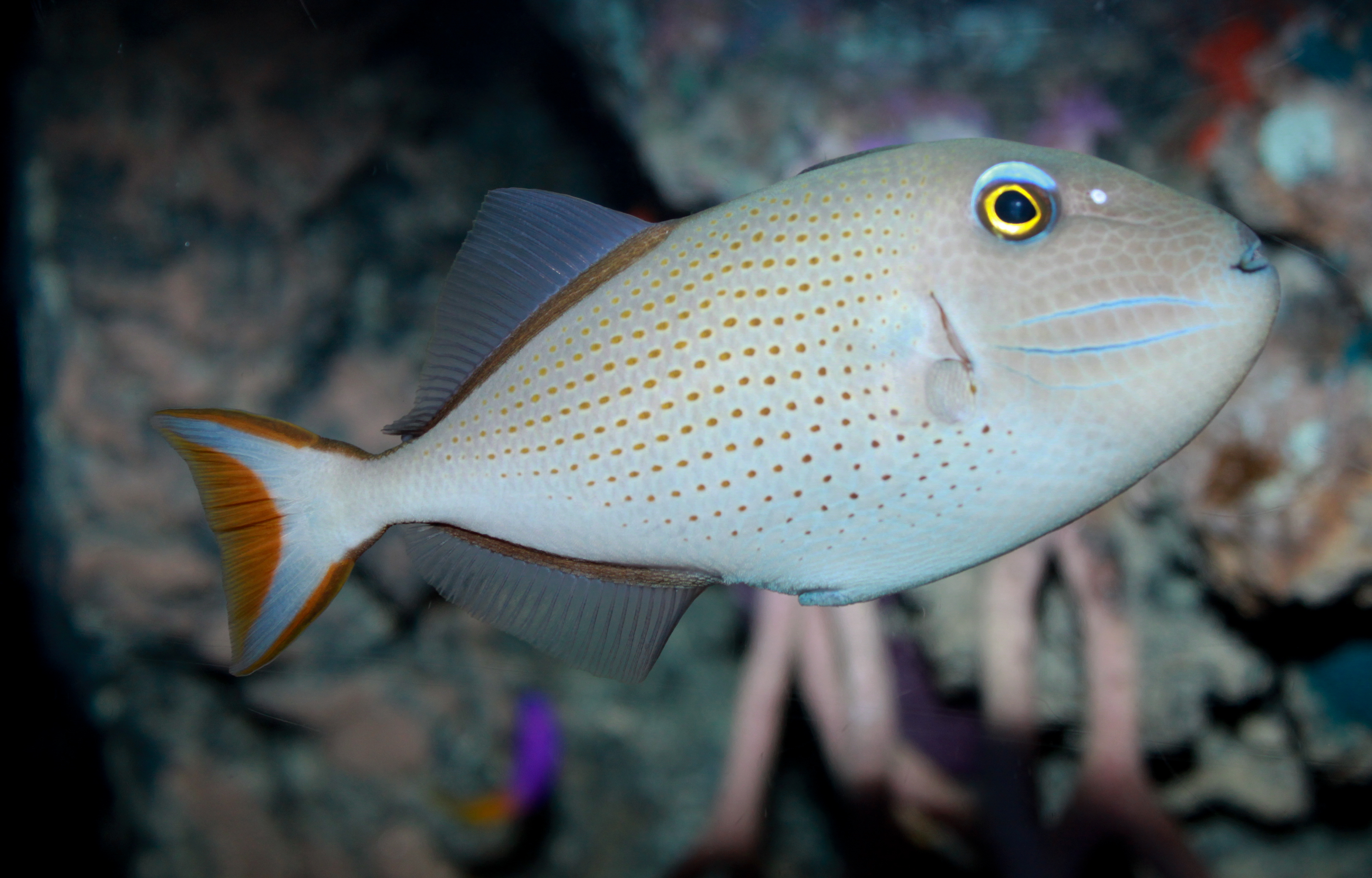
Adult sargassum triggerfish (Xanthichthys ringens) live around reefs and banks, but juveniles live around sargassum.

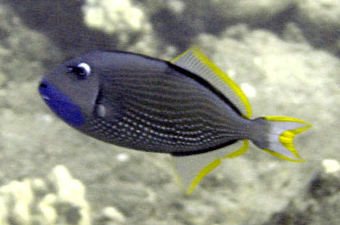
The gilded triggerfish (Xanthichthys auromarginatus) is among the few sexually dimorphic triggerfish. The female lacks the blue throat and yellow fin-edging.

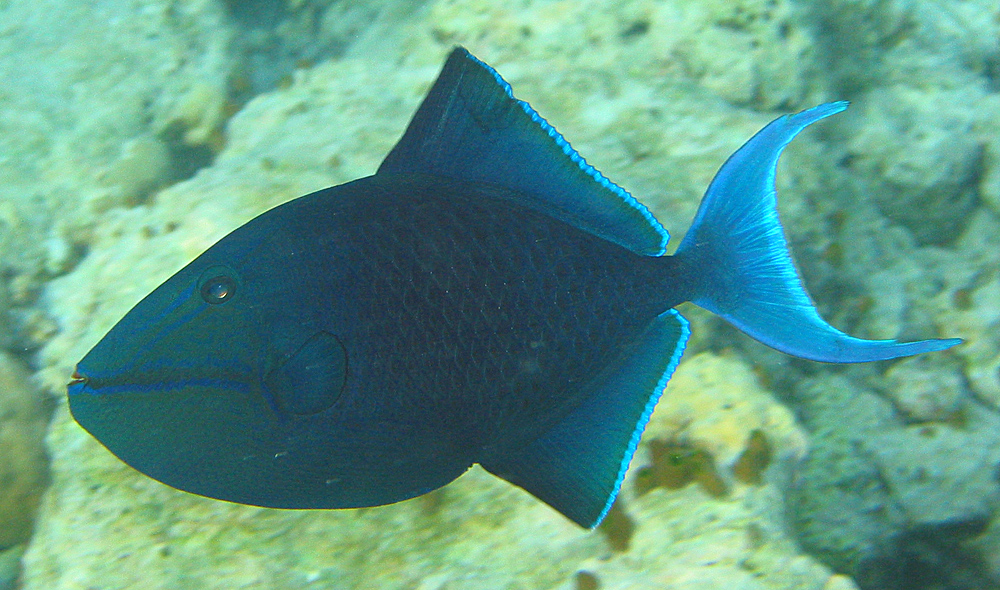
The redtoothed triggerfish (Odonus niger) is one of the relatively few planktivores of the family.

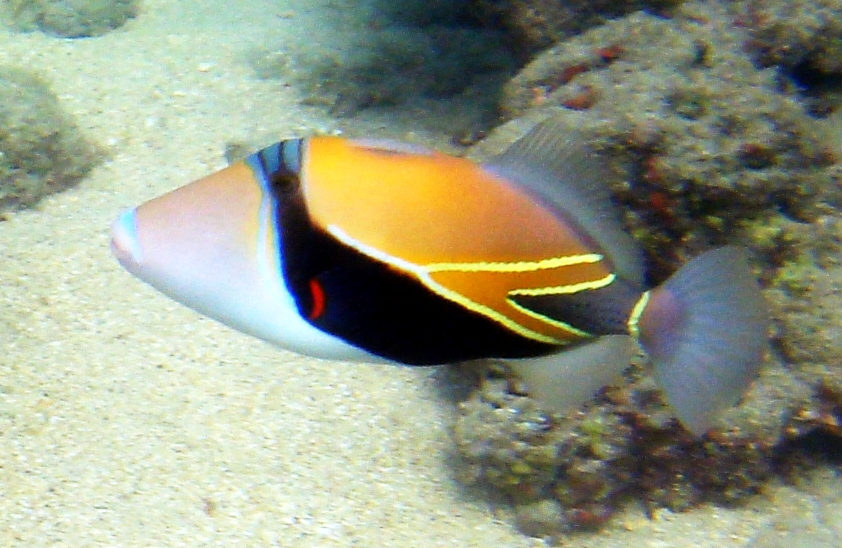
The reef triggerfish (Rhinecanthus rectangulus) is the state fish of Hawaii.

- Acanthostracion polygonius
- Balistoidei
  - Balistidae
    - - Balistes punctatus
      - - Pseudobalistes fuscus
        - - Pseudobalistes naufragium
          - - Balistes polylepis
            - - Balistes capriscus
              - Balistes vetula
    - - - - - Balistoides viridescens
            - Pseudobalistes flavimarginatus
          - - Xanthichthys ringens
            - - Xanthichthys auromarginatus
              - Xanthichthys mento
        - - Odonus niger
          - - - Balistapus undulatus
              - Balistoides conspicillum
            - - Melichthys niger
              - - Melichthys indicus
                - Melichthys vidua
      - - - Canthidermis maculata
          - Canthidermis sufflamen
        - - - Abalistes stellaris
            - Abalistes stellatus
          - - - - Sufflamen fraenatum
                - Sufflamen verres
              - - Sufflamen bursa
                - - Sufflamen albicaudatum
                  - Sufflamen chrysopterum
            - - - Rhinecanthus verrucosus
                - - Rhinecanthus abyssus
                  - Rhinecanthus lunula
              - - Rhinecanthus rectangulus
                - - Rhinecanthus aculeatus
                  - Rhinecanthus assasi
  - Monacanthidae

=== Fossil record ===
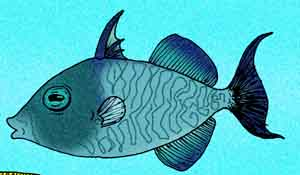
Illustration of †Oligobalistes

These fossil genera are also known:

- †Balistomorphus Gill, 1888 - Early Oligocene of Switzerland
- †Gornylistes Bannikov & Tyler, 2008 - Middle Eocene (Bartonian) of the North Caucasus, Russia
- †Lobodus Costa, 1866 - Late Eocene to Early Oligocene of Italy and Alabama, US
- †Oligobalistes Daniltshenko, 1960 - Early Oligocene of the North Caucasus, Russia

== Behavior ==
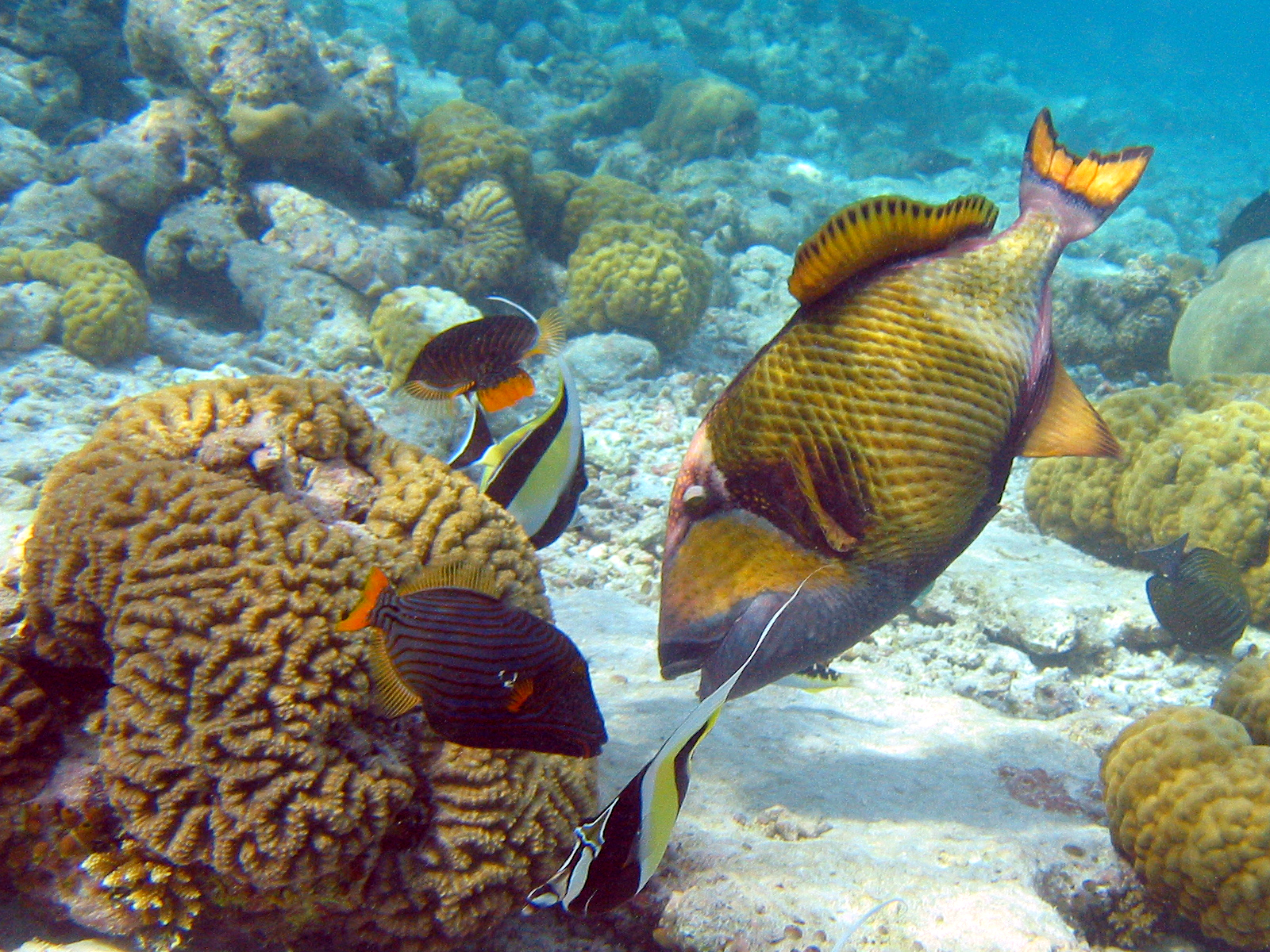
Titan triggerfish can move relatively large rocks when foraging. Smaller fish, in this case orange-lined triggerfish and moorish idol, often follow and feed on leftovers.

The anatomy of the triggerfish reflects its typical diet of slow-moving, bottom-dwelling crustaceans, mollusks, sea urchins, and other echinoderms, generally creatures with protective shells and spines. Many also take small fishes and some feed on algae, such as the members of the genus Melichthys. A few, for example the redtoothed triggerfish (Odonus niger), mainly feed on plankton. They are known to exhibit a high level of intelligence for a fish, and have the ability to learn from previous experiences.

Off Florida, juveniles of some species of triggerfishes are found in floating Sargassum, where they feed on the small shrimp, crabs, and mollusks found there.

=== Reproduction ===
Triggerfish spawning is timed in relation to lunar cycles, tides, and time of changeover of tides. In relation to lunar cycles, eggs are observed 2–6 days before the full moon and 3–5 days before the new moon. In relation to tides, spawning happens 1–5 days before the spring tide. In relation to timing of tides, eggs are observed on days when high tides take place around sunset.

Triggerfish males migrate to their traditional spawning sites prior to mating and establish territories. Males of certain species (i.e. Balistes carolinensis and Pseudobalistes flavimarginatus) build hollow nests within their territories. Male and female triggerfish perform certain prespawning behaviors - blowing and touching. Pairs may blow water on the sandy bottom (usually in the same spot at the same time) and set up their egg site. They touch their abdomens on the bottom as if they are spawning. During actual spawning, eggs are laid on the sandy sea bottom (triggerfish are demersal spawners despite their large size). Eggs are scattered and attached to sand particles. Triggerfish eggs are usually very small (diameter of 0.5–0.6 mm) and are easily spread by waves.

==== Territoriality ====
Triggerfish males are fierce in guarding their territories as having a territory is essential for reproduction. A male's territory is used for spawning and parental care. Most male territories are located over a sandy sea bottom or on a rocky reef. A single territory usually includes more than one female, and the male mates with all of the females residing in or visiting his territory (polygyny). In Hachijojima, Izu Islands, Japan, one male crosshatch triggerfish (Xanthichthys mento) has up to three females in his territory at the same time, and mates with them in pairs. Each male red-toothed triggerfish (Odonus niger) mates with more than 10 females in his territory on the same day. Yellow margin triggerfish (Pseudobalistes flavimarginatus) also exhibit polygyny.

Some triggerfish species can be quite aggressive when guarding their eggs. Both the Picasso (Rhinecanthus aculeatus) and titan triggerfish (Balistoides viridescens) viciously defend their nests against intruders, including scuba divers and snorkelers. Their territory extends in a cone from the nest toward the surface, so swimming upwards can put a diver further into the fishes' territory; a horizontal swim away from the nest site is best when confronted by an angry triggerfish. Unlike the relatively small Picasso triggerfish, the titan triggerfish poses a serious threat to inattentive divers due to its large size and powerful teeth.

After spawning, both the male and female participate in caring for the fertilized eggs (biparental egg care). A female triggerfish stays near the spawning ground, around 5 m off the bottom, and guards the eggs within her territory against intruders. Some common intruders include Parupeneus multifasciatus, Zanclus cornutus, Prionurus scalprum, and conspecifics. Besides guarding, females roll, fan, and blow water on eggs to provide oxygen to the embryos. This behavior of female triggerfish is called "tending", and males rarely perform this behavior. A male triggerfish stays farther above the eggs and guards all the females and eggs in his territory. Males exhibit aggressive behaviors against conspecific males near the boundaries of their territories.

In crosshatch triggerfish (Xanthichthys mento) and yellow margin triggerfish (Pseudobalistes flavimarginatus), eggs are spawned in the morning and they hatch after the sunset on the same day. After hatching of embryos, the female crosshatch triggerfish leaves the male's territory. This mating system is an example of male-territory-visiting polygamy. Triggerfishes exhibit other types of mating systems, as well, such as a nonterritorial-female (NTF) polygyny and territorial-female (TF) polygyny. In NTF polygyny, nonterritorial females stay in the male's territory and reproduce. In TF polygyny, a female owns territory within a male's territory and will spawn in her territory.

== Relation to humans ==
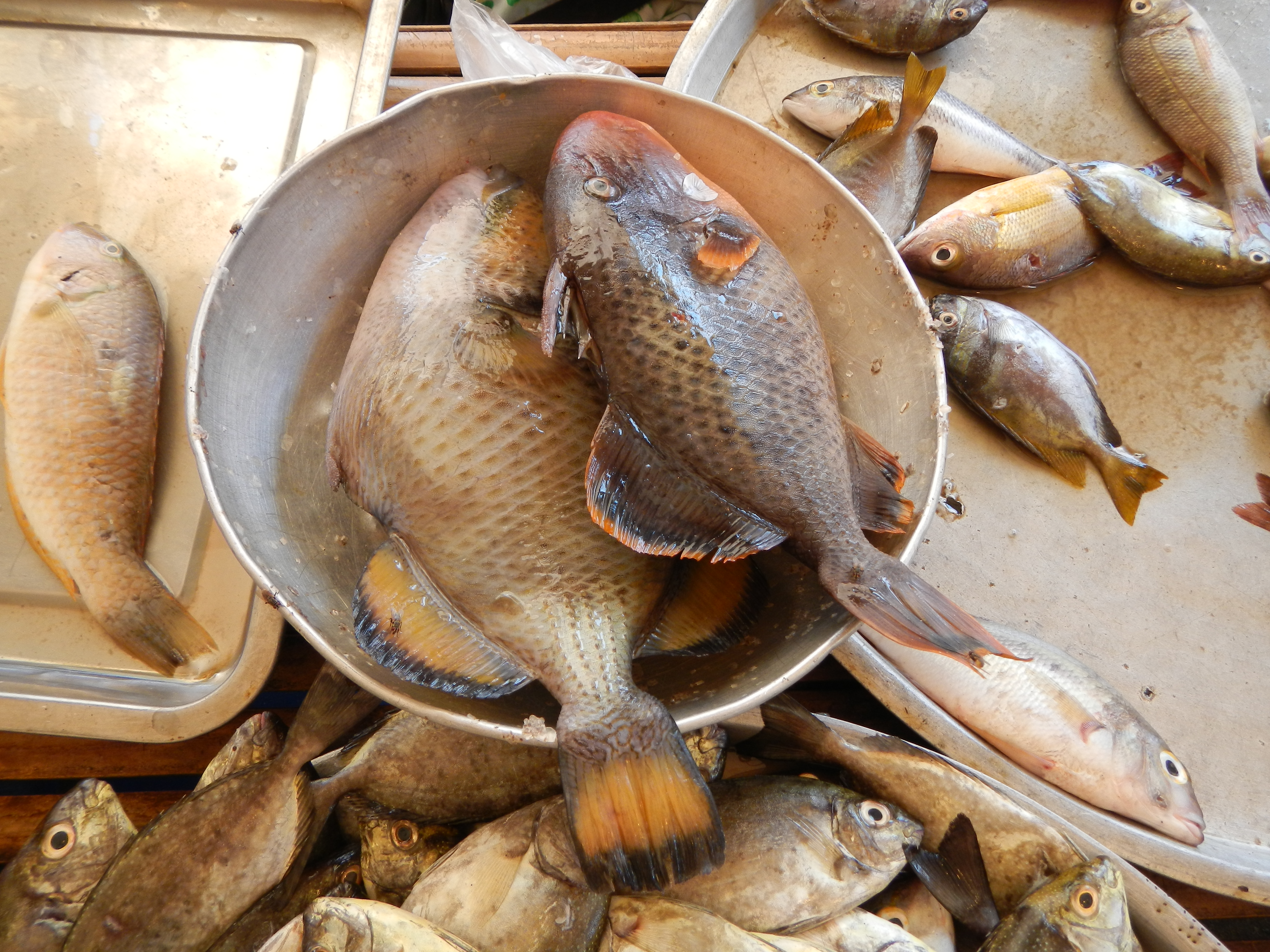
Titan and yellowmargin triggerfish at a fish market, in the Philippines

Some species of triggerfish, such as the titan triggerfish, may be ciguatoxic and should be avoided. Others, however, such as the grey triggerfish (Balistes capriscus), are edible.
