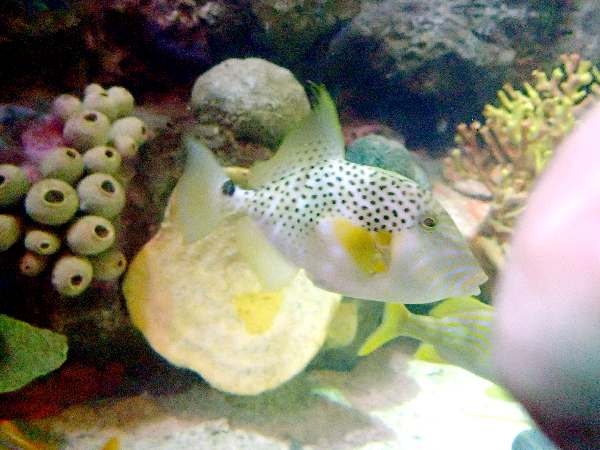

Conservation status
- Vulnerable (IUCN 3.1)

Scientific classification
- Kingdom: Animalia
- Phylum: Chordata
- Class: Actinopterygii
- Division: Teleostei
- Order: Tetraodontiformes
- Family: Balistidae
- Genus: Balistes
- Species: B. punctatus

Binomial name
- Balistes punctatus J. F. Gmelin, 1789

Synonyms
- List: Balistes guttatus Walbaum, 1792; Balistes ciliaris Bloch & Schneider, 1801; Balistes radiata Bowdich, 1825; Balistes dichrostigma Duméril, 1861; Balistes liberiensis Steindachner, 1867

= Balistes punctatus =

Species of fish

Balistes punctatus, the bluespotted triggerfish or spotted triggerfish, is a species of marine ray-finned fish belonging to the family Balistidae, the triggerfishes. This species occurs in the Eastern Atlantic Ocean off the Western coast of Africa.

== Taxonomy ==
Balistes punctatus was first formally described in 1789 by the German naturalist Johann Friedrich Gmelin with the type locality given as the "Indian Ocean".

== Etymology ==
Balistes punctatus is classified in the genus Balistes, a name which refers to the first spine of the dorsal fin being locked in place by the erection of the shorter second trigger spine, and unlocked by depressing the second spine. Balistes is taken directly from the Italian pesca ballista, the "crossbow fish". Ballista originally being a machine for throwing arrows. The specific name punctatus means "spotted" and is a reference to the spots on the body and base of the dorsal fin.

== Distribution and habitat ==
Balistes punctatus is found in the Eastern Atlantic Ocean along the coast of Western Africa, between Morocco and Angola. It is also found in Madeira, Canary Islands, Cape Verde Islands and the islands in the Gulf of Guinea.

One record from the eastern Mediterranean Sea off Lebanon in June 2020 is thought to be a released aquarium fish.

It is found at depths down to 200 m (660 ft) in coastal waters on sandy and rocky bottoms.

== Description ==
In captivity

Balistes punctatus has a deep and laterally compressed body. There are 3 spines on the first dorsal fin and there are between 1 and 3 spines and 26 to 28 soft rays in the second dorsal fin, with the third to sixth rays o=in the second dorsal fin are filamentous and grow beyond the fin membrane. The anal fin contains around 22–24 rays. The caudal peduncle is laterally compressed, and the upper and lower rays in the caudal fin are elongated. The overall colour is grey to brown with a pattern of dark spots covering almost all of the body and to the rear of the eyes, the spots fade towards the belly which is unspotted. There are 5 or 6 pale radial bluish stripes which are visible to the front of the lower orbit and there are curved pale blue lines that extend backwards and downwards across the snout, behind the mouth. There are verical, vertical undulating lines abve the base of the anal fin. Both the caudal fin and the dorsal fin have black spots, as does the base of the pectoral fin. The area immediately behind the head is bright yellow. The upper base of the caudal fin has a black blotch. The bluespotted triggerfish has a maximum published total length of 60 cm (24 in), although typically this is 25 cm (9.8 in), and a maximum weight of 1.8 kg (4.0 lb).

== Conservation status ==
Balistes puncatus has a relatively wide distribution but the triggerfish catch has declined in the decades leading up to 2025 in Togo and Ghana. The biomass of the bluespotted triggerfish has decreased from the late 1980s despite the same fishing effort being made and in 1989-91 almost no triggerfish were caught in Ghanaian coastal waters. There were some indications that the fishery was possibly under-exploited, and the significant decline in biomass was due to changes in environmental conditions. However, the triggerfish fishery in Ghana remains inactive, and the IUCN have stated that more research is needed on why this species has declined. A decline of more than 99% has been recorded in the Gulf of Guinea in the three generation lengths up to 2015. In all, the overall population has been assessed to have declined by over 30%. The IUCN has listed the bluespotted triggerfish as Vulnerable and calls for research to ensure that it is not more threatened.
