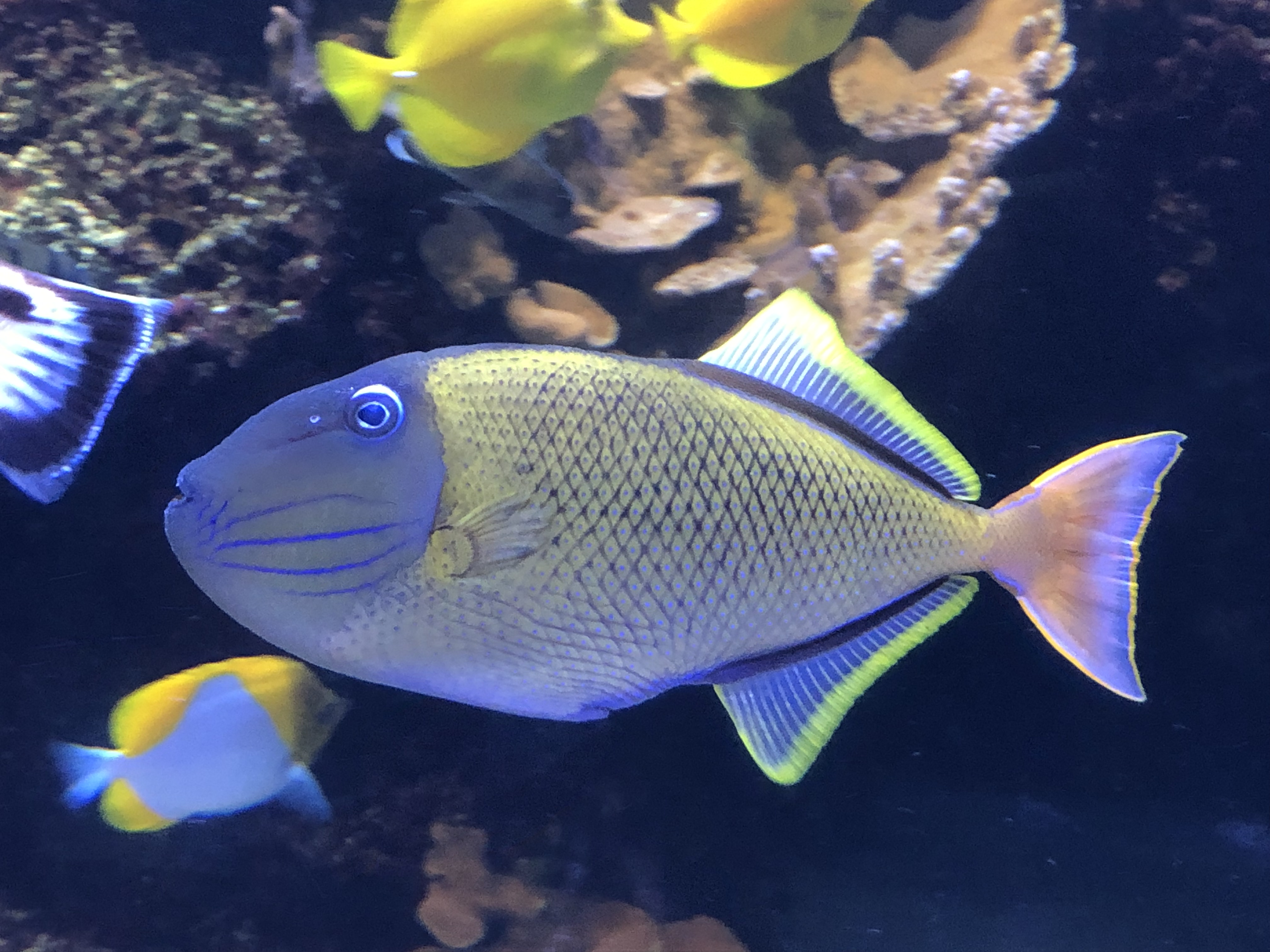

Conservation status
- Least Concern (IUCN 3.1)

Scientific classification
- Kingdom: Animalia
- Phylum: Chordata
- Class: Actinopterygii
- Order: Tetraodontiformes
- Family: Balistidae
- Genus: Xanthichthys
- Species: X. mento

Binomial name
- Xanthichthys mento (D. S. Jordan & C. H. Gilbert, 1882)

= Xanthichthys mento =

Redtail Triggerfish

Species of fish

Xanthichthys mento, the redtail triggerfish, blue-throat triggerfish, or crosshatch triggerfish, is a species of triggerfish from the Pacific. It inhabits outer-reef areas at depths of 6–131 m (20–430 ft), and feeds on zooplankton. Xanthichthys mento grows to a size of 29 cm (11 in) in length and occasionally makes its way into the aquarium trade.
