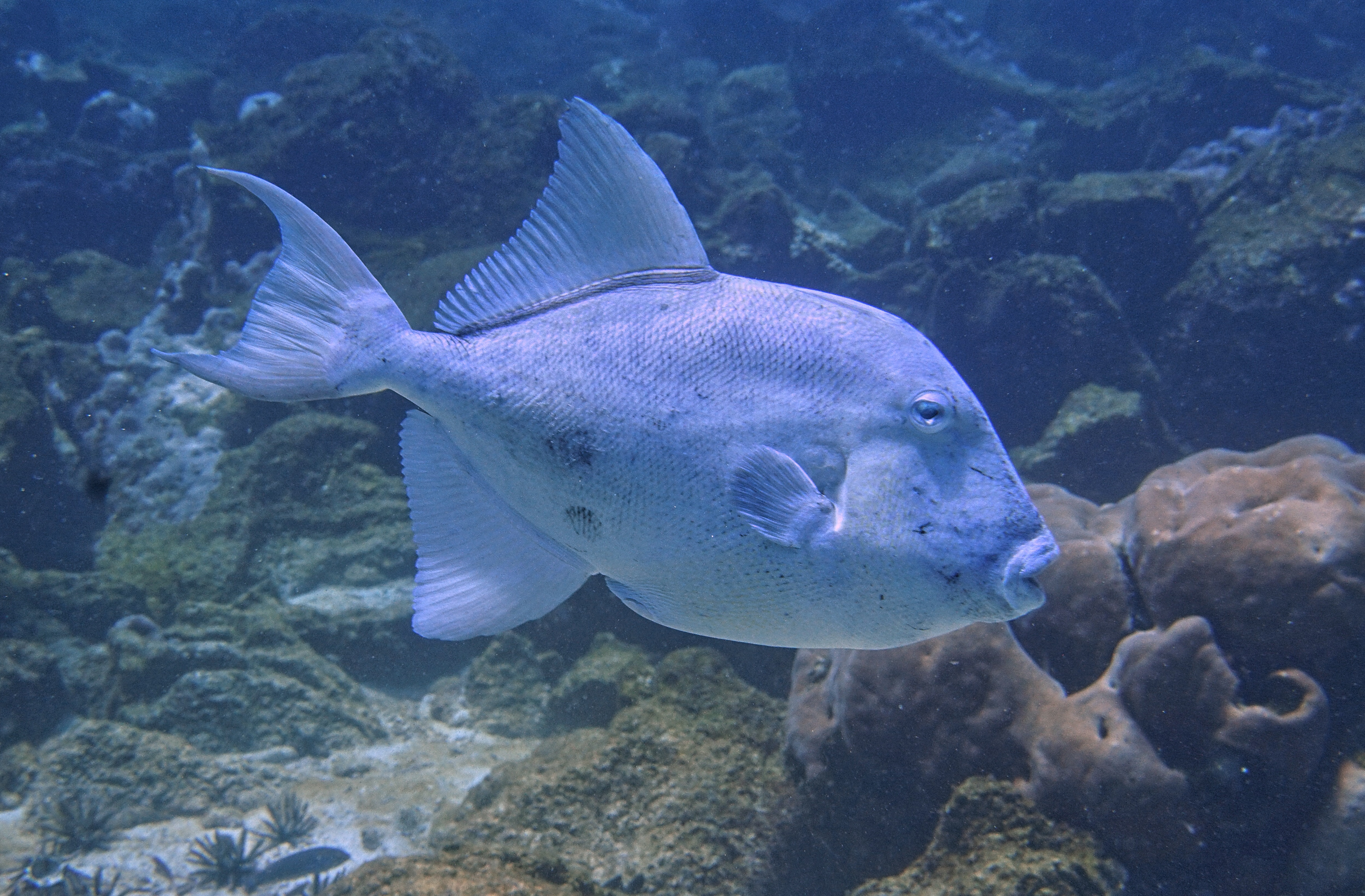
- In the Galapagos

Conservation status
- Least Concern (IUCN 3.1)

Scientific classification
- Kingdom: Animalia
- Phylum: Chordata
- Class: Actinopterygii
- Order: Tetraodontiformes
- Family: Balistidae
- Genus: Balistes
- Species: B. polylepis

Binomial name
- Balistes polylepis Steindachner, 1876

Synonyms
- Pseudobalistes polylepis (Steindachner, 1876); Verrunculus polylepis (Steindachner, 1876)

= Balistes polylepis =

Species of fish

Balistes polylepis, the finescale triggerfish, is a species of marine ray-finned fish belonging to the family Balistidae, the triggerfishes. This triggerfish is found in the Eastern Pacific Ocean.

== Taxonomy ==
Balistes polylepis was first formally described in 1876 by the Austrian ichthyologist Franz Steindachner with its type locality given as Magdalena Bay, Baja California Sur in Mexico. The genus Balistes is the type genus of the family Balistidae, which is classified in the suborder Balistoidei in the order Tetraodontiformes.

== Etymology ==
Balistes polylepis is classified in the genus Balistes, a name which refers to the first spine of the dorsal fin being locked in place by the erection of the shorter second trigger spine, and unlocked by depressing the second spine. Balistes is taken directly from the Italian pesca ballista, the "crossbow fish". Ballista originally being a machine for throwing arrows. The specific name polylepismeans "many scales" and is a reference to the numerous, small scales arranged in to longitudinal rows of 70-75 scales.

== Description ==
The finescale triggerfish has a maximum published total length of 76 cm (30 in), although typical total length is 50 cm (20 in).

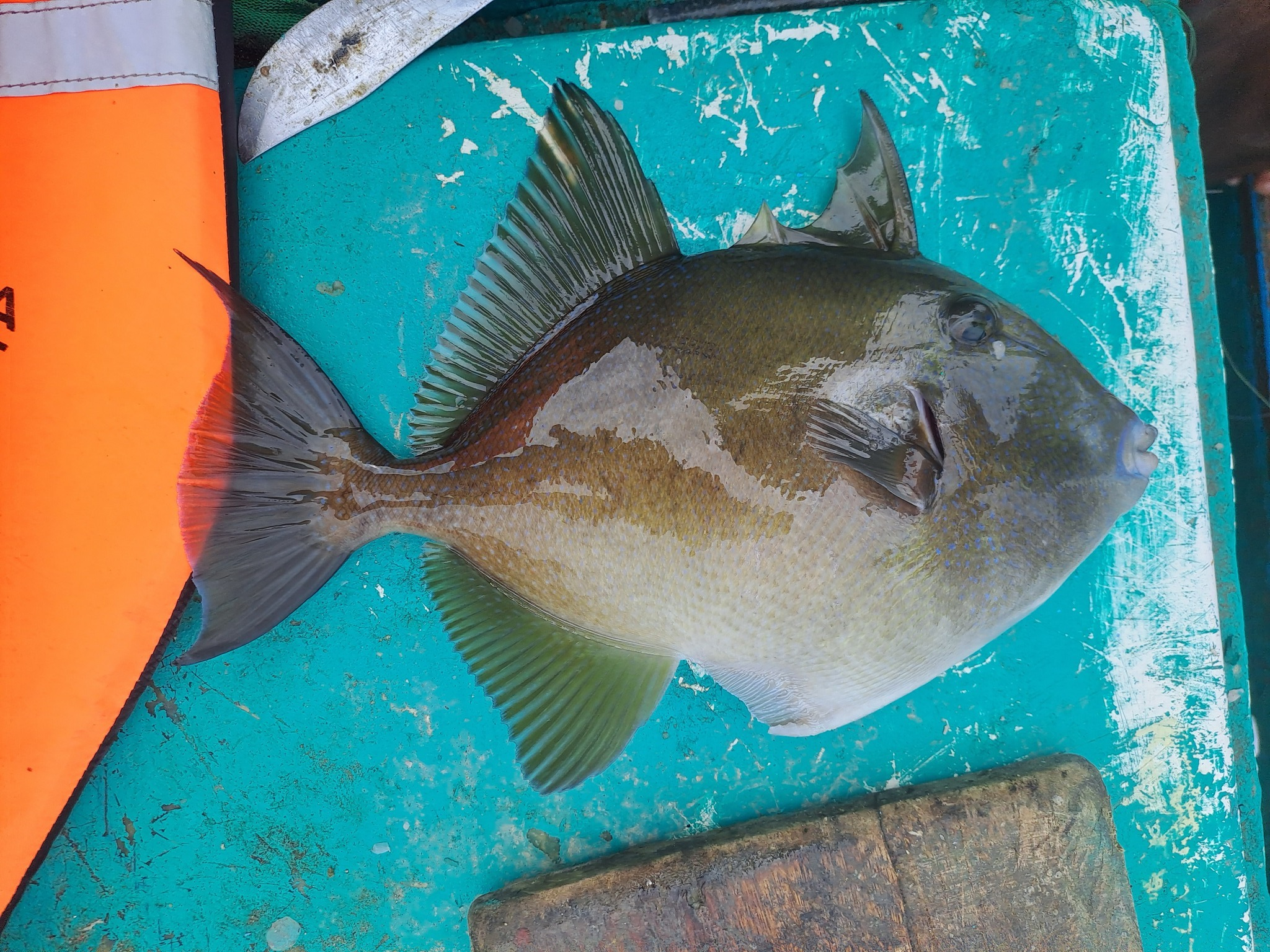
With fins fully extended

Balistes polylepis has a robust, rather deep, compressed, oblong-shaped bodies. There is a clear groove which runs from below the eye to just above the nostril and a small, front opening mouth which contains strong jaws, There are 8 large outer teeth on each jaw while the teeth in the iside of the jaw are notched with the largest side teeth in the centre. The gill slit is short and located in front of the base of the pectoral fin, The dorsal fin has 3 spines, the first spine is lockable in the erect position, the second spine is half the length of the first. There are 26-28 soft rays in the dorsal, the 24 -26 soft rays in the anal, 13-15 soft rays in the pectoral fins and these are all branched. The caudal peduncle is laterally compressed and has no spines, tuvercles or ridges on it and the caudal fin is concave or doubly concave with elongated lobes. The pelvic fins are vestigial and consist of four scales forming a case for the end of the pelvis The skin is thick and leathery with plate-like scales that are arranged in regular diagonal rows. The snout is completely covered in scales. The large, bony scales behind the gill slit for a tympanum. The lateral line is difficult to discern. This fish is plain brown or plain gray with no obvious markings.

== Distribution and habitat ==
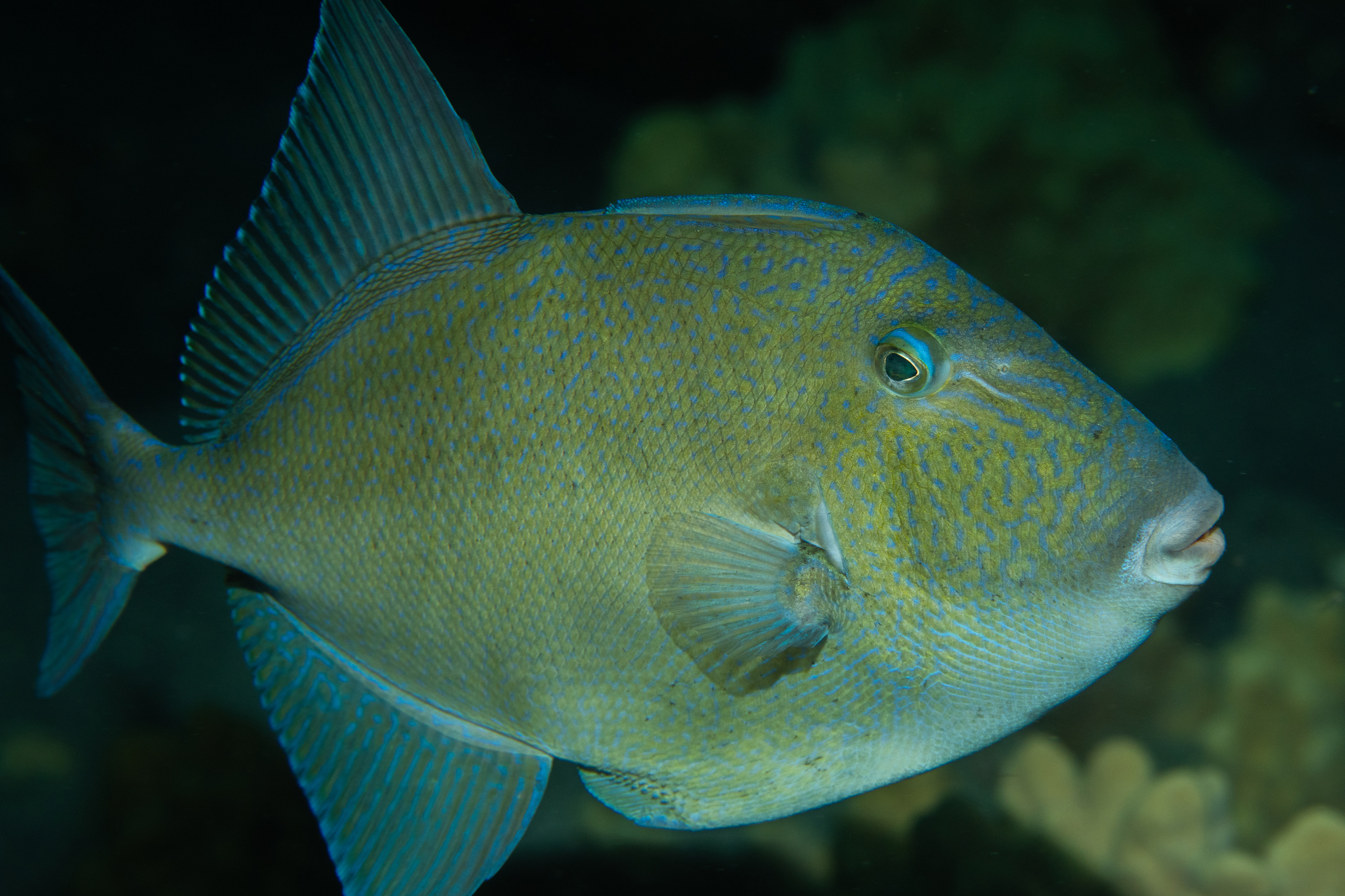
In Hawaii

Balistes polylepis is found in the Eastern Pacific Ocean from northern California south to central Chile, and on the islands offshore from there including the Revillagigedo Islands, Cocos Island, Malpelo Island and the Galápagos Islands. It occurs as a vagrant in Hawaii, although it may be in the process of colonising that archipelago, and in 1999 it was recorded in the Marquesas Islands. It is found in on rocky reefs, slopes with boulders and nearby areas of sand at depths between 3 and 50 m (9.8 and 164.0 ft).

== Behavior ==
Balistes polylepis are demersal as adults and pelagic as juveniles. The diet of this fishes comprises sea urchins, crustaceans and mollusks.
