= Xenobalistes =

Scientific classification
- Kingdom: Animalia
- Phylum: Chordata
- Class: Actinopterygii
- Division: Teleostei
- Order: Tetraodontiformes
- Family: Balistidae
- Genus: Xenobalistes
- Species: X. tumidipectoris

Binomial name
- Xenobalistes tumidipectoris Matsuura, 1981

Species of fish

Xenobalistes tumidipectoris is a species of triggerfish found in the western central Pacific Ocean.

== Taxonomy ==
The holotype of the monotypic genus Xenobalistes was a half digested specimen found inside a tuna. It was probably a juvenile. Phylogenetics have found that Xenobalistes is nested within the genus Xanthichthys.
