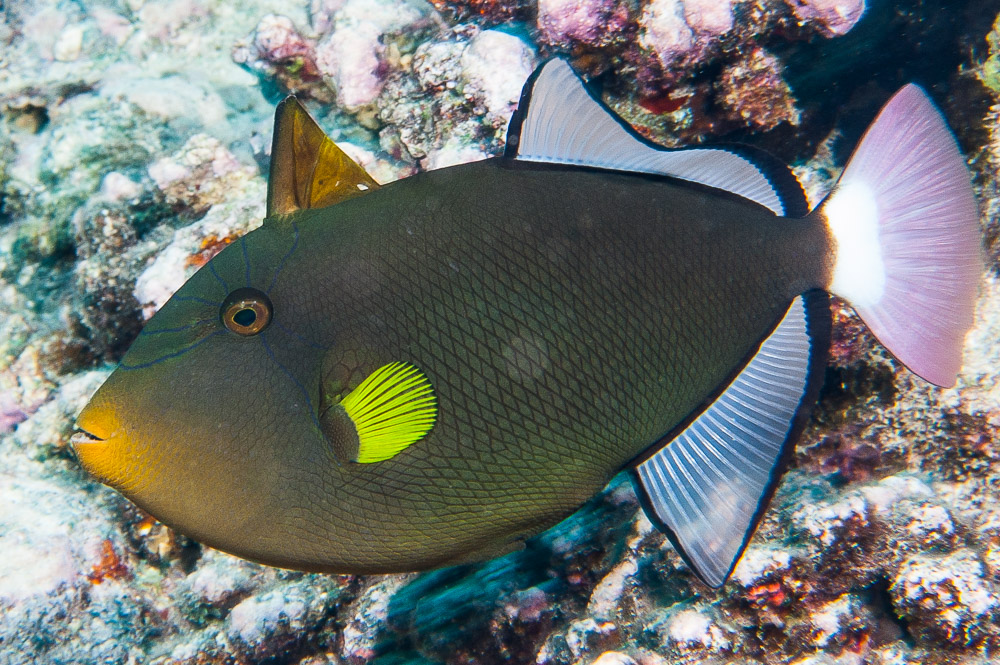
- Melichthys vidua

Scientific classification
- Kingdom: Animalia
- Phylum: Chordata
- Class: Actinopterygii
- Order: Tetraodontiformes
- Family: Balistidae
- Genus: Melichthys; Swainson, 1839

= Melichthys =

Genus of fishes

Melichthys is a small genus in the triggerfish family (Balistidae). Member species are found in the Indian Ocean, Pacific Ocean and even the Red Sea (M. niger). The Black triggerfish is the largest species in this genus at 45 cm in length and the Indian triggerfish is the smallest at 25 cm. Melichthys niger and Melichthys indicus are similar in appearance and are often confused.

== Species ==
There are currently 3 recognized species in this genus:

Image	Scientific name	Common name	Distribution
	Melichthys indicus J. E. Randall & Klausewitz, 1973	Indian triggerfish	Indian Ocean.
	Melichthys niger Bloch, 1786	Black triggerfish	Hawaii, up through Polynesia, westward to the East Indies and across the Indian Ocean
	Melichthys vidua J. Richardson, 1845	Pinktail triggerfish	Indo-Pacific.
