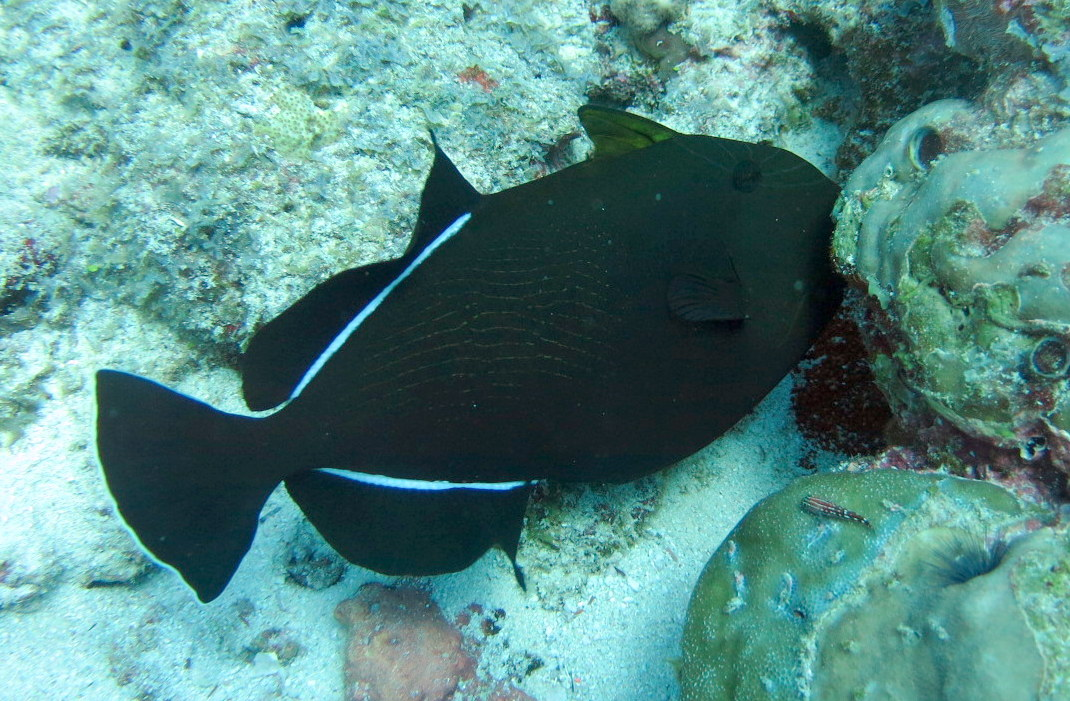

Conservation status
- Least Concern (IUCN 3.1)

Scientific classification
- Kingdom: Animalia
- Phylum: Chordata
- Class: Actinopterygii
- Order: Tetraodontiformes
- Family: Balistidae
- Genus: Melichthys
- Species: M. indicus

Binomial name
- Melichthys indicus J. E. Randall & Klausewitz, 1973

= Indian triggerfish =

Species of fish

The Indian triggerfish (Melichthys indicus), also known as the black-finned triggerfish, has a brown body and black fins with white lines at the base of the dorsal and anal fins. It is found across the Indian Ocean. They can grow up to 10 in (25 cm) long.

The Indian triggerfish usually feeds on hard-shelled mollusks and echinoderms, but some feed on algae and zooplankton. They are often very aggressive over their eggs, but are otherwise harmless. Indian triggerfish are very easy to keep at home. Some are peaceful but some are very aggressive towards other fish.

These are not to be confused with the Hawaiian black triggerfish or black durgon (Melichthys niger), which is often mistaken as being Indian triggerfish within the trade. The Indian triggerfish has never been found near Hawaii, but the two species bear a striking resemblance between each other because of the similar shape and coloration.
