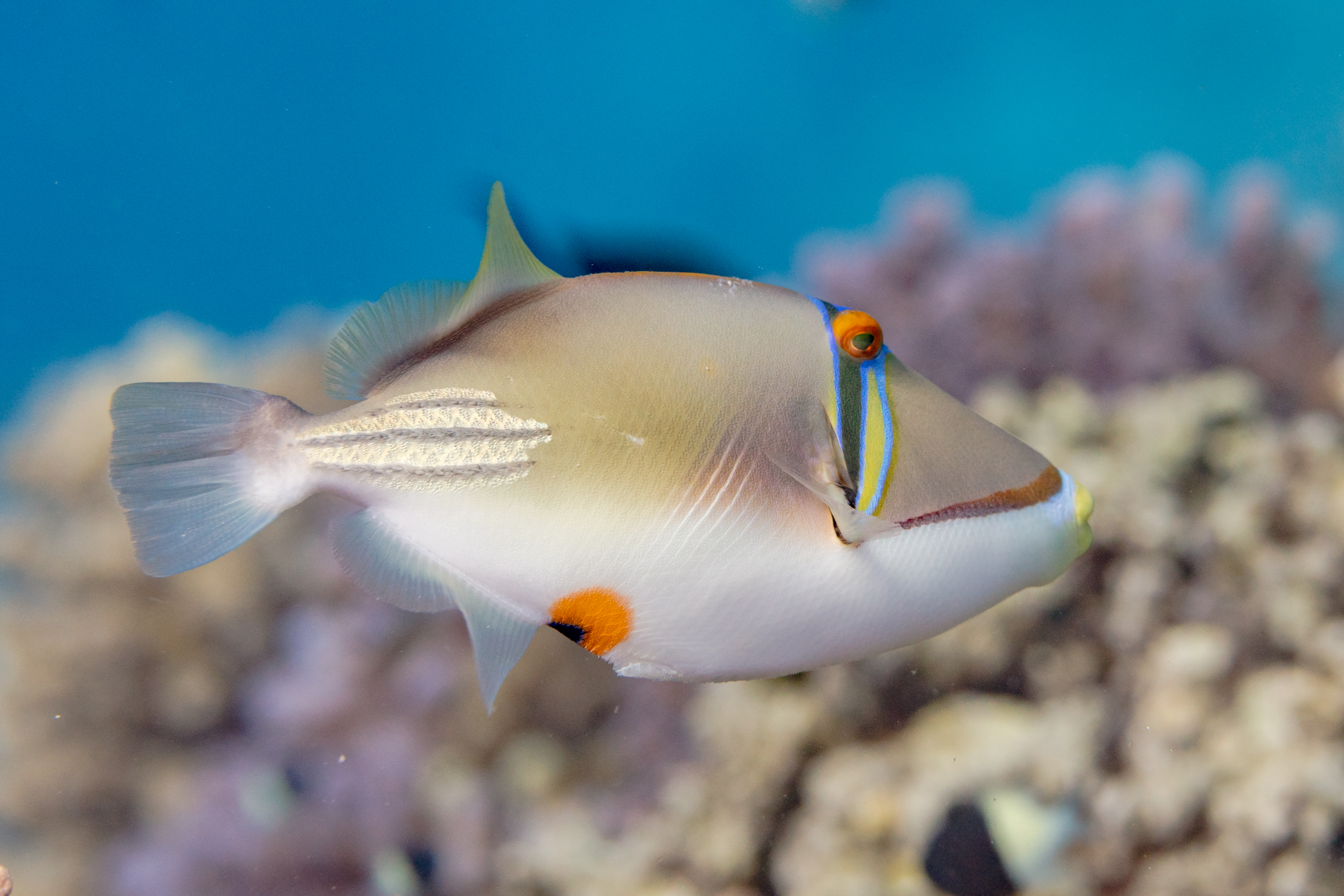

Conservation status
- Least Concern (IUCN 3.1)

Scientific classification
- Kingdom: Animalia
- Phylum: Chordata
- Class: Actinopterygii
- Order: Tetraodontiformes
- Family: Balistidae
- Genus: Rhinecanthus
- Species: R. assasi

Binomial name
- Rhinecanthus assasi (Forsskål, 1775)

= Rhinecanthus assasi =

Assasi triggerfish

Species of fish

Rhinecanthus assasi, commonly known as the Assasi triggerfish or Arabian picassofish, is a species of fish in the family Balistidae, the triggerfishes.

== Description ==
Rhinecanthus assasi reaches up to 30 centimeters long. It is tan above and white below with blue stripes between and below the eyes. It feeds mostly on invertebrates.

== Habitat and distribution ==
R. assasi mostly lives in or near coral reefs. It occurs in the western Indian Ocean, including the Red Sea and Persian Gulf.
