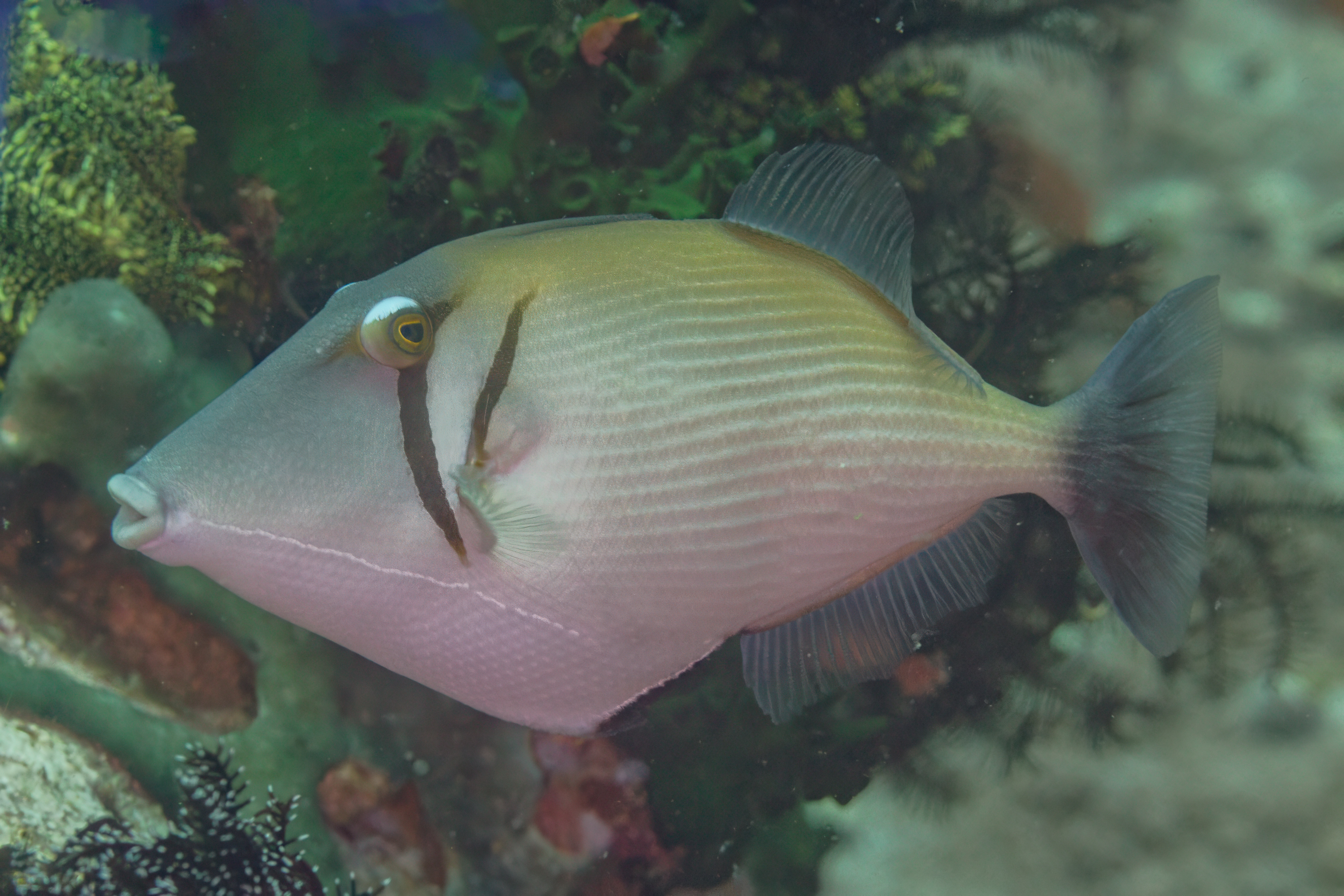
- Sufflamen bursa

Scientific classification
- Kingdom: Animalia
- Phylum: Chordata
- Class: Actinopterygii
- Division: Teleostei
- Order: Tetraodontiformes
- Family: Balistidae
- Genus: Sufflamen; D. S. Jordan, 1916

= Sufflamen =

Genus of fishes

Sufflamen is a genus of triggerfishes that is native to the reefs of the Indian and Pacific Oceans.

== Species ==
There are currently 5 recognized species in this genus:

Image	Scientific name	Common name	Distribution
	Sufflamen albicaudatum Rüppell, 1829	Bluethroat triggerfish	Western Indian Ocean
	Sufflamen bursa Bloch & J. G. Schneider, 1801	Boomerang triggerfish	Indo-Pacific.
	Sufflamen chrysopterum Bloch & J. G. Schneider, 1801	Halfmoon triggerfish	Indo-Pacific
	Sufflamen fraenatum Latreille, 1804	Masked triggerfish	Indo-Pacific
	Sufflamen verres C. H. Gilbert & Starks, 1904	Orangeside triggerfish	Tropical eastern Pacific coasts
