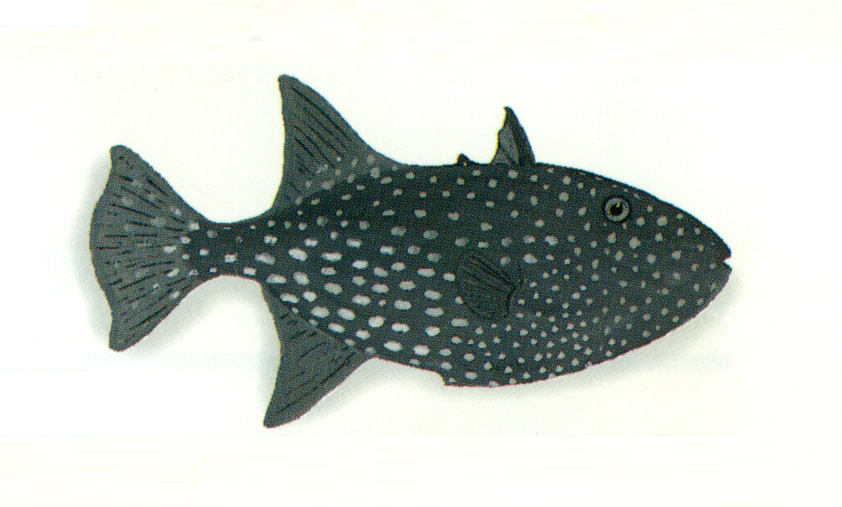

Scientific classification
- Kingdom: Animalia
- Phylum: Chordata
- Class: Actinopterygii
- Order: Tetraodontiformes
- Family: Balistidae
- Genus: Canthidermis
- Species: C. maculata

Binomial name
- Canthidermis maculata Bloch, 1786

= Canthidermis maculata =

Spotted oceanic triggerfish or Rough triggerfish

Species of fish

Canthidermis maculata, also known as rough triggerfish or spotted oceanic triggerfish, is a species of triggerfish native to the tropical and subtropical oceans worldwide. Unlike most triggerfish, they are mostly pelagic.

In the Philippines, the species is locally called Tikos in the Cebuano language and is abundant in the Visayas and Mindanao island groups.

== Distribution and habitat ==
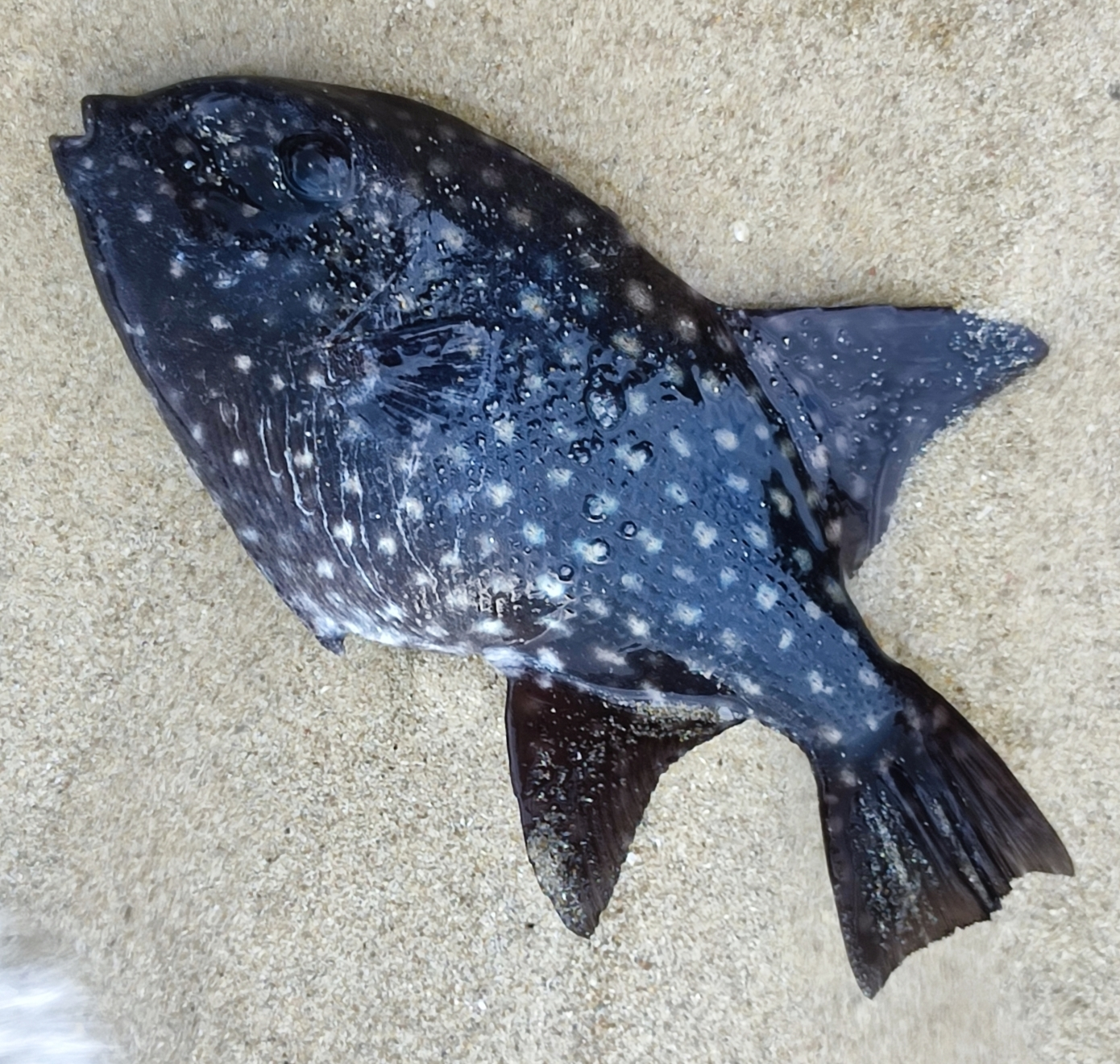
In Thailand

In the western Pacific Ocean it ranges from the Gulf of Thailand north to the Yellow Sea and Japan, also extending eastward to the Philippines, Indonesia, and all the way to Polynesia and Hawaii. In the eastern Pacific Ocean, they are found from Mexico and around the Gulf of California down to Peru and the Galapagos Islands. Around the Indian Ocean, it ranges from the Red Sea and eastern Africa to the Seychelles, the Maldives, the Persian Gulf, India, Sri Lanka, the Andaman Sea, Australia, and Indonesia. Populations in the Atlantic Ocean range from New York down to the Gulf of Mexico, the Bahamas, the Caribbean Sea and down to Brazil on the western side. Around the eastern Atlantic Ocean, it ranges from the British Isles and the Bay of Biscay to the Azores, the Canary Islands and western Africa. Some populations are also found in South Africa. The spotted oceanic triggerfish inhabits warm waters high in biodiversity, characterized by strong surface currents and upwelling systems (Lezama-Ochoa et al., 2016). It can be found on deep slopes right offshore, in open water (Matsuura, 2001) and under fish aggregating devices (FADs), where they have been seen in groups of hundreds or thousands (Taquet et al., 2007).

== Description ==
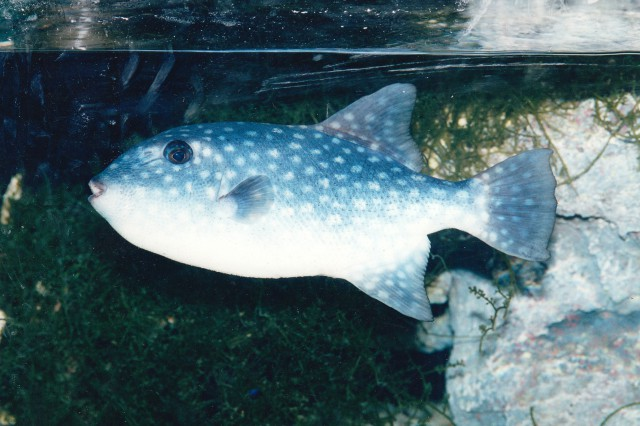
Canthidermis maculata

The maximum length for this species is 50 centimetres (20 in), but usually grows up to 35 centimetres (14 in). Adults and juveniles have different coloration. Adults are blue grayish, while juveniles are grayish black with white spots that fade over age. Adults may be seen with dark blotches appearing on the face and pectoral fins during mating. These markings are also present on females hovering above their nests, and may disappear within a few seconds once they ascend through in the water column, away from their nest (Clark et al., 2014). In this fish, the dorsal and anal fins are curved on the back. The dorsal fin of this species has from 23 to 27 rays; its first dorsal fin’s rays are spinous, with the first two rays more like sharp thorns. The smaller second thorn props up the longer first thorn, giving it the appearance of a trigger, after which the fish is named (Tupongov, 2015). Its anal fin has 20 to 27 rays. Adults and juveniles also have different caudal fin shapes: juveniles have rounded caudal fins and adults have concave ones.

== Ecology ==
Canthidermis maculata are noted hosts of sea lice (Copepoda: Caligidae) in the Neotropical region (Morales-Serna et al., 2016). Additionally, they have been recorded as visitors of cleaning stations hosted by the black-nosed butterflyfish and the Mexican hogfish, at Malpelo Island in the tropical eastern pacific (Quimbayo et al., 2016).

=== Diet ===
Spotted oceanic triggerfish display plasticity in their eating habits, being considered either a carnivorous or a planktivorous fish. Upon examination, they have been shown to consume smaller fish, Halobates (sea skaters), Siphonophores, and smaller cartilaginous fish (Senta et al., 1993).

=== Predation ===
The oceanic triggerfish falls prey to large pelagic fish such as the Indo-Pacific Sailfish (Varghese et al., 2013), the dolphinfish (Mahi-mahi) (Oxenford et al., 1999), and sea birds such as Streaked Shearwaters which are found in Japan (Matsumoto et al., 2012). Additionally, eggs in nests that are not defended by a mother oceanic triggerfish are known to be preyed upon by smaller opportunistic fish such as the goatfish, Parupeneus multifasciatus, the checkerboard wrasse, Halichoeres hortulanus, as well as other triggerfish such as the orange-lined triggerfish, Balistapus undulates, and the titan triggerfish, Balistapus viridescens (Clark et al., 2014).

=== Behavior ===
Canthidermis maculata are known to gather in large groups, hundreds and sometimes thousands (Taquet et al., 2007) and are frequently associated with FADs. These aggregations may also include other species such as the sleek unicorn surgeonfish, Naso hexacanthus. Oceanic triggerfish are currently thought to move as a group, migrating together from the open ocean to shallower waters for nesting purposes, and returning together to the open ocean once nesting is complete. They are typically nonaggressive, shy, and easily scared away from their nests when confronted by bigger fish such as the titan triggerfish, and divers. It is likely, due to diver observations of courtship patterns, that only female oceanic triggerfish exhibit nest guarding behaviors and though easily scared away by larger fish, will defend their nest from smaller carnivorous fish such as goatfish and wrasse (Clark et al., 2014).

== Importance to humans ==
This fish species shows some importance to commercial fishing. The spotted oceanic triggerfish, like other triggerfish, is sold at local markets in coastal Asian countries as a fish to be eaten. These triggerfish are not typically fished for specifically but rather are caught as by-catch in tuna purse seine fishing and on longlines (Sethi et al., 2011; Lezama-Ochoa et al., 2016, Matsuura, 2001). Additionally, the spotted oceanic triggerfish is sold in the aquarium trade.

There have been reports of ciguatera poisoning in some humans that consumed the fish.

Fishermen living in the town of Kinniya, Sri Lanka, use this species in marine fish production.

== Development ==
Once Canthidermis maculata has laid its nest of eggs, the eggs incubate for 33-36 hours. After incubation, the larvae hatch during the night and immediately swim towards the surface in a likely attempt to avoid discovery by potential predators. Once at the surface, wind and currents (Alevizon, 1976) are suspected to carry the larvae into the open ocean, thus explaining the uneven distribution of larvae and juveniles in the spotted oceanic triggerfish’s range (Clark et al., 2014). In the open ocean, larvae and juveniles aggregate around FADs such as Sargassum, floating seaweed, and other debris until adulthood (Clark et al., 2014).

=== Breeding and nesting ===
Adults pair up and breed.

Canthidermis maculata nesting is unlikely to be impacted by lunar cycle and has been determined to occur year-round. Eggs are deposited in sand and/or coral rubble, shallowly buried beneath the sand, and are both aerated and guarded by the mother. Frequently, many nests are located near one another, supporting the idea that these triggerfish nest as a group. It is unclear how often a female nests per year and whether or not it returns to the same nest or builds new nests in its habitat range. Additionally, nests have been found at depths ranging from 4 meters to over 45 meters, with the deeper nests being considered a defensive strategy against titan triggerfish (Clark et al., 2014) which nest at shallower depths and are known to be territorial when nesting (Randall et al., 1990).

=== Conservation status ===
The worldwide populations of Canthidermis maculata are considered stable and the IUCN considers this species of the conservation status: least concern.
