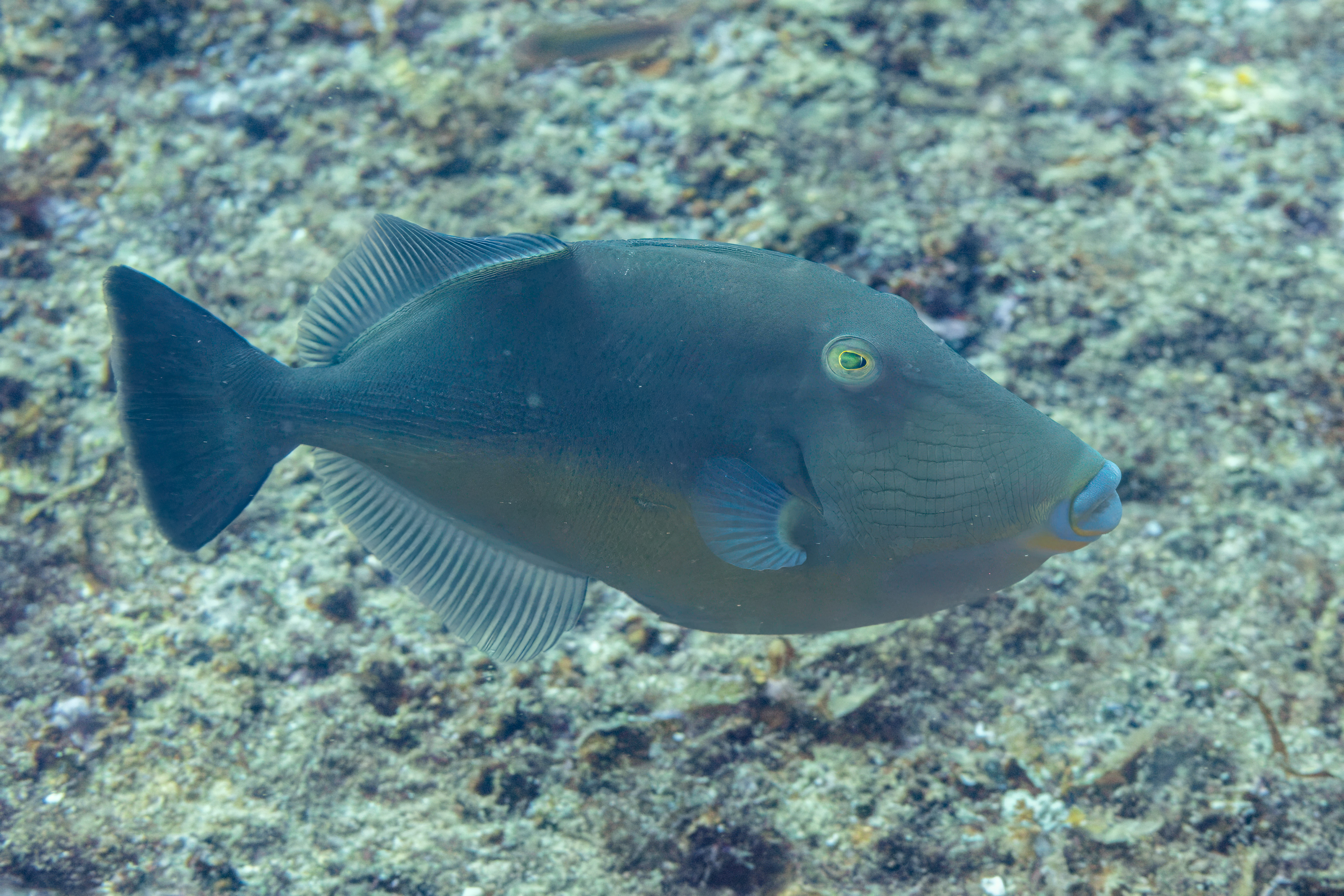

Conservation status
- Least Concern (IUCN 3.1)

Scientific classification
- Kingdom: Animalia
- Phylum: Chordata
- Class: Actinopterygii
- Order: Tetraodontiformes
- Family: Balistidae
- Genus: Sufflamen
- Species: S. verres

Binomial name
- Sufflamen verres (C. H. Gilbert & Starks, 1904)

= Orangeside triggerfish =

Species of fish

The orangeside triggerfish (Sufflamen verres) is a species of triggerfish found along the Pacific coast of Central and South America from Mexico to Ecuador. It is also found around the Galapagos Islands.
