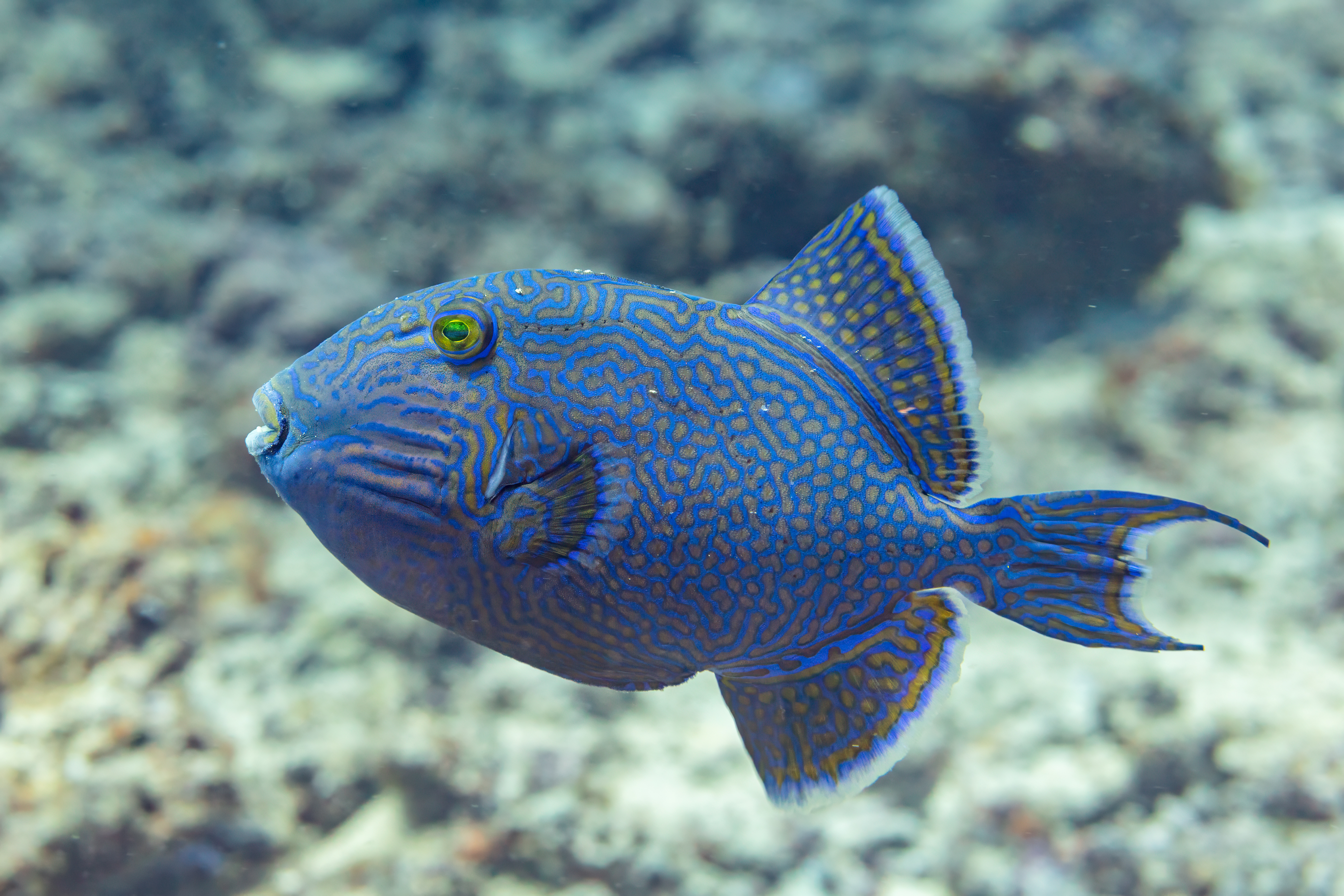
- Pseudobalistes fuscus

Scientific classification
- Kingdom: Animalia
- Phylum: Chordata
- Class: Actinopterygii
- Division: Teleostei
- Order: Tetraodontiformes
- Family: Balistidae
- Genus: Pseudobalistes; Bleeker, 1865

Type species
- Balistes flavimarginatus Rüppell 1829

= Pseudobalistes =

Genus of fishes

Pseudobalistes is a genus of fish belonging to the family Balistidae.

== Species ==
There are currently 3 recognized species in this genus:

| Image | Scientific name | Common name | Distribution |
|---|---|---|---|
| | Pseudobalistes flavimarginatus Rüppell, 1829 | Yellowmargin triggerfish | Indo-Pacific, Red Sea |
| | Pseudobalistes fuscus (Bloch & J. G. Schneider, 1801) | blue triggerfish, rippled triggerfish, yellow-spotted triggerfish and blue-and-gold triggerfish | Indo-Pacific, Red Sea |
| | Pseudobalistes naufragium D. S. Jordan & Starks, 1895 | Stone triggerfish | Tropical eastern Pacific coast |
