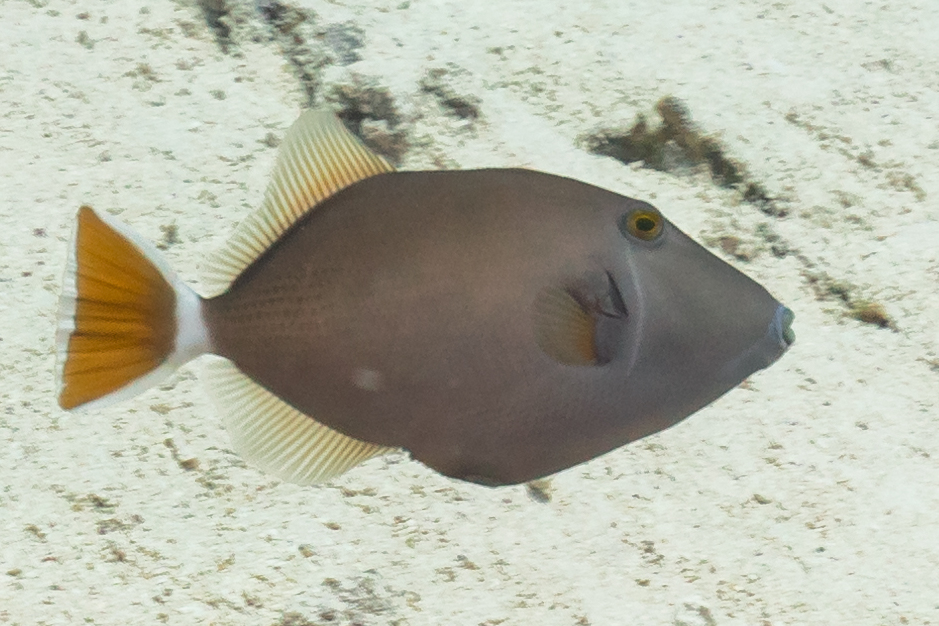

Scientific classification
- Kingdom: Animalia
- Phylum: Chordata
- Class: Actinopterygii
- Order: Tetraodontiformes
- Family: Balistidae
- Genus: Sufflamen
- Species: S. albicaudatum

Binomial name
- Sufflamen albicaudatum (Rüppell, 1829)

= Sufflamen albicaudatum =

Species of fish

The bluethroat triggerfish (Sufflamen albicaudatum) is a triggerfish from the western Indian Ocean. It is occasionally seen in the aquarium trade. It grows to 22 cm (8.7 in) in length.
