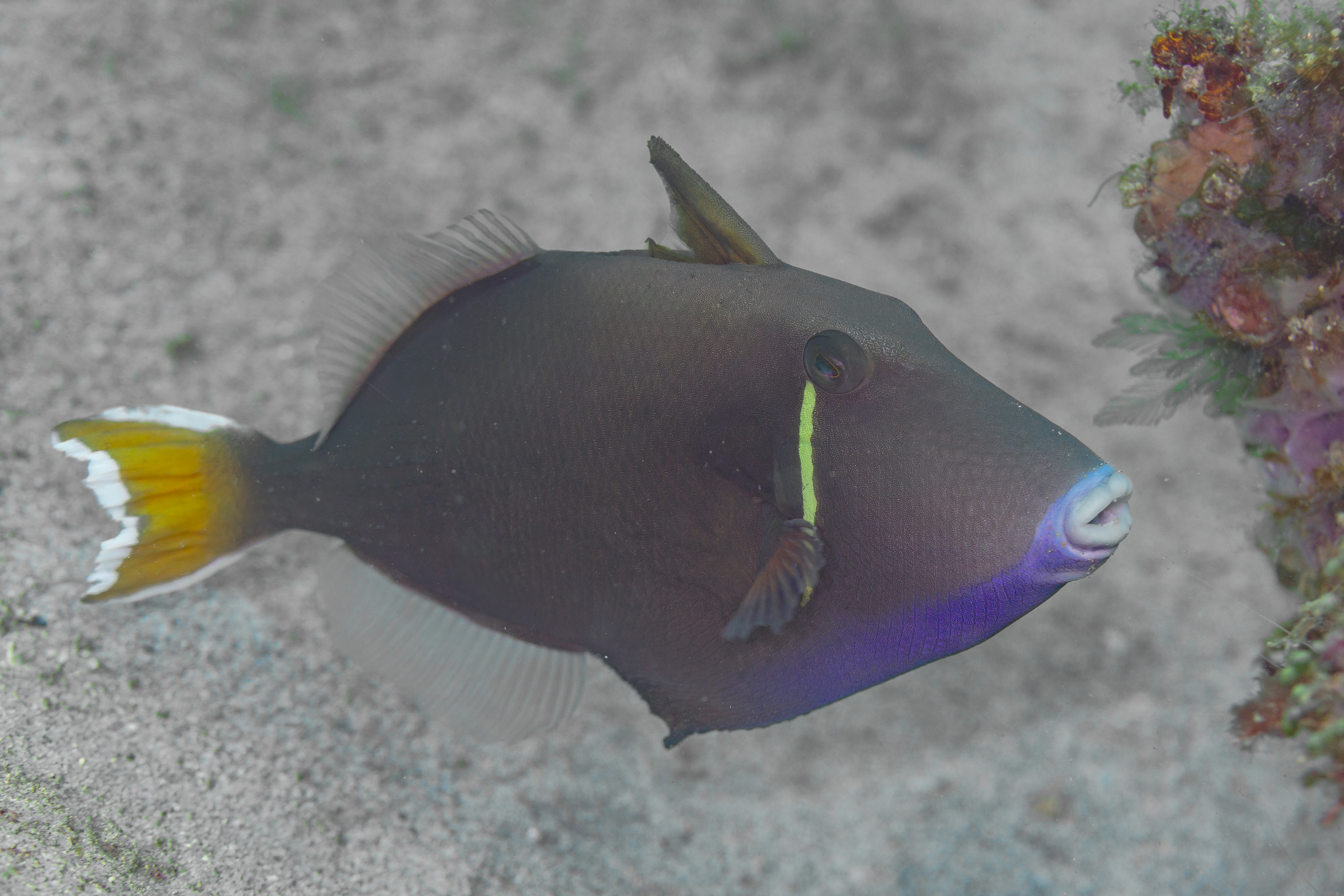

Conservation status
- Least Concern (IUCN 3.1)

Scientific classification
- Kingdom: Animalia
- Phylum: Chordata
- Class: Actinopterygii
- Order: Tetraodontiformes
- Family: Balistidae
- Genus: Sufflamen
- Species: S. chrysopterum

Binomial name
- Sufflamen chrysopterum (Bloch & J. G. Schneider, 1801)

= Halfmoon triggerfish =

Species of fish

The halfmoon triggerfish (Sufflamen chrysopterum) is a triggerfish of the tropical Indo-West Pacific area.

The halfmoon triggerfish lives around seaward reefs and shallow lagoons. It is solitary and is often found around coral looking for small invertebrates, like crustaceans and worms, on which it feeds.

The halfmoon picassofish species is often also named halfmoon triggerfish.

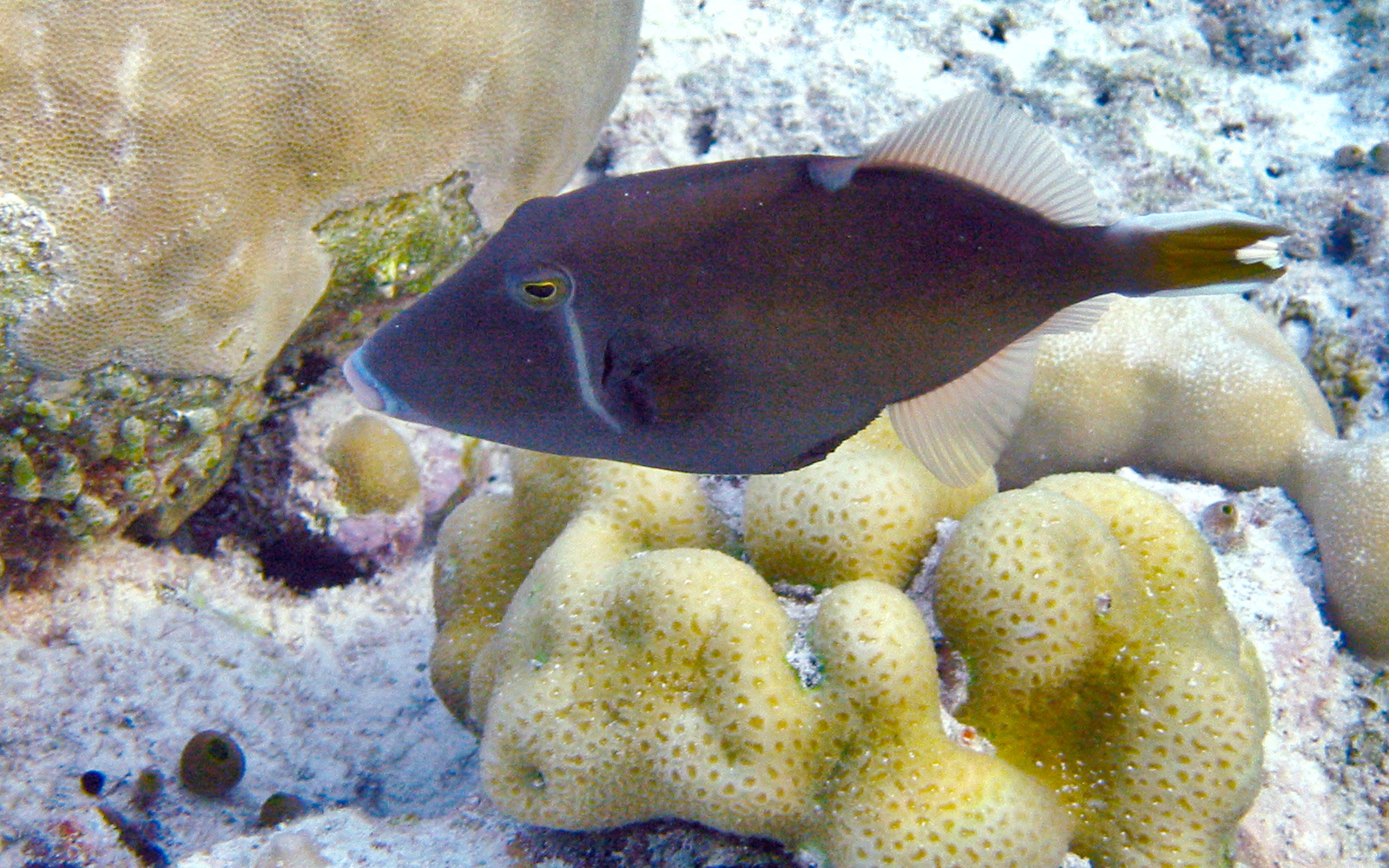
The halfmoon triggerfish is a solitary fish.
