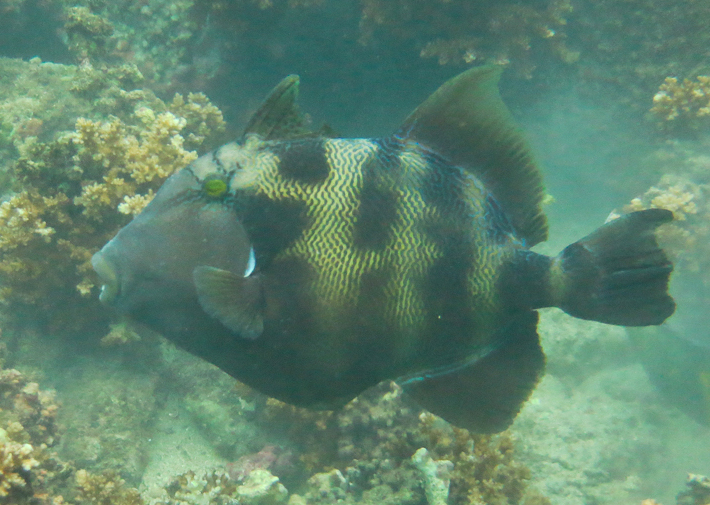

Conservation status
- Least Concern (IUCN 3.1)

Scientific classification
- Kingdom: Animalia
- Phylum: Chordata
- Class: Actinopterygii
- Order: Tetraodontiformes
- Family: Balistidae
- Genus: Pseudobalistes
- Species: P. naufragium

Binomial name
- Pseudobalistes naufragium (D. S. Jordan & Starks, 1895)

Synonyms
- Balistes naufragium Jordan & Starks, 1895

= Stone triggerfish =

Species of fish

The stone triggerfish (Pseudobalistes naufragium) is the largest species of triggerfish.

== Distribution ==
The stone triggerfish is found at reefs and over sandy bottoms in the eastern Pacific, ranging from Baja California (Mexico) to Chile.

== Description ==
The stone triggerfish can reach 1 metre (3.3 ft) in length, but is more common at about half that size. Covered entirely with platelike scales aside from one scaleless area behind the jaws, the stone triggerfish has 16 strong protruding teeth, with 8 held in each jaw.

== Diet ==
Pseudobalistes naufragium feeds on small crustaceans, mollusks, and sea urchins.

== Gallery ==
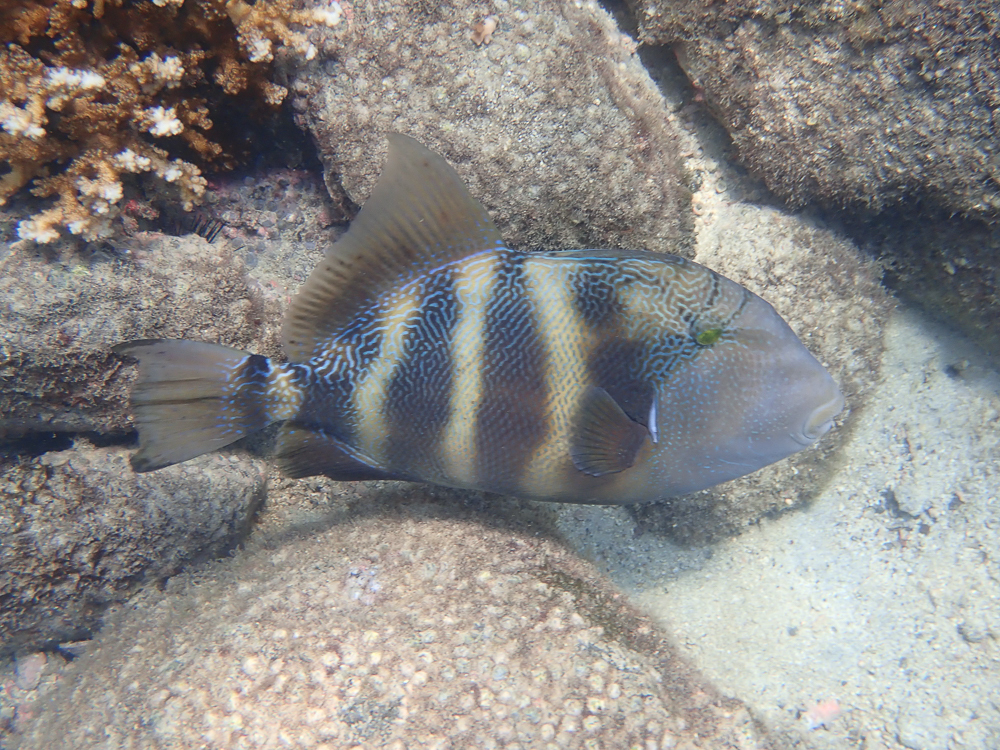

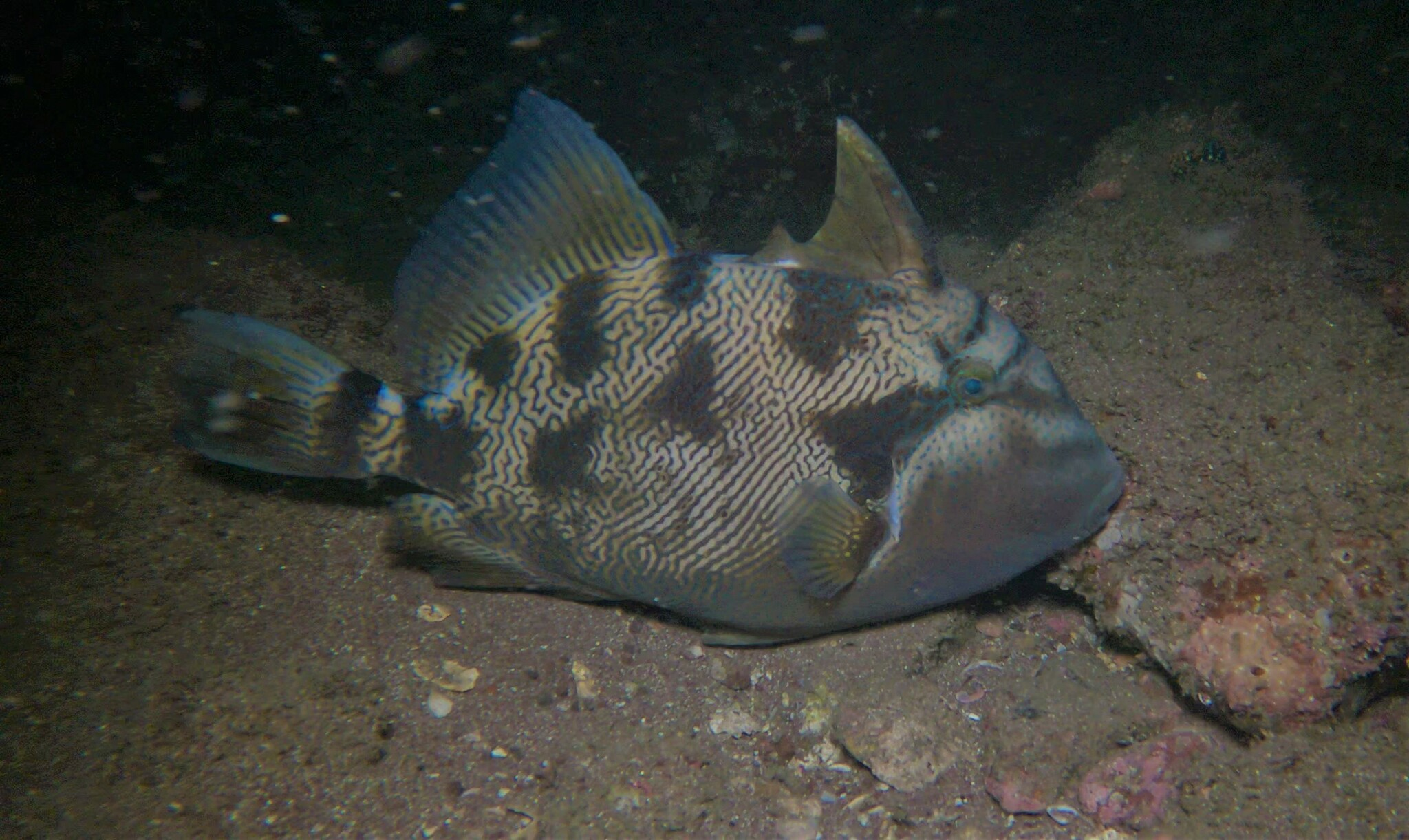
