= Blue-lined triggerfish =

"Blue-lined triggerfish" can refer to either of 2 species of such fishes:

- Pseudobalistes fuscus (blue triggerfish or rippled triggerfish)
- Xanthichthys caeruleolineatus
