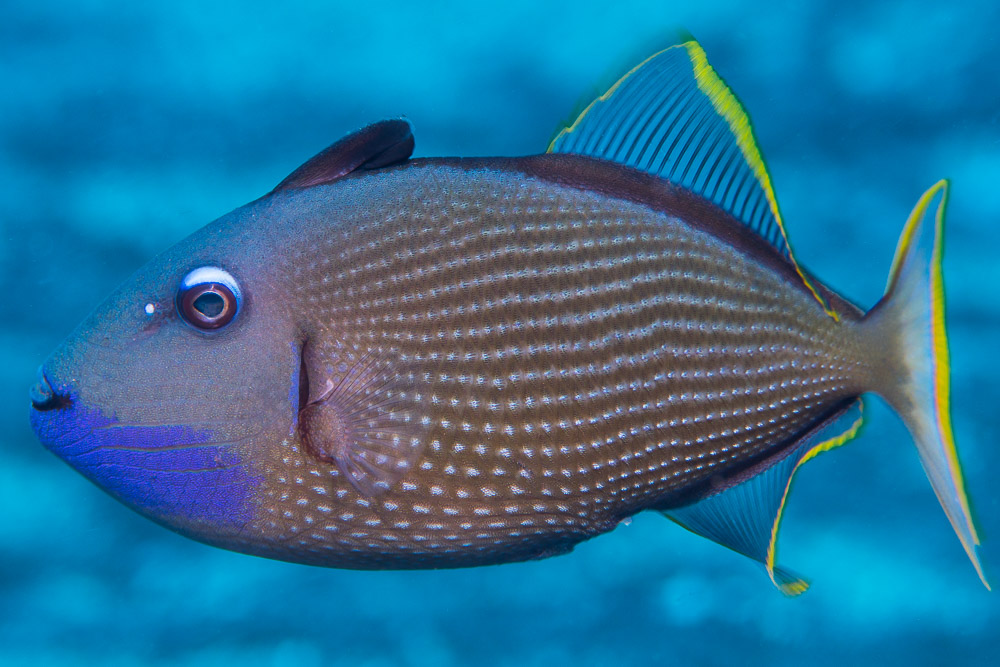
- Male
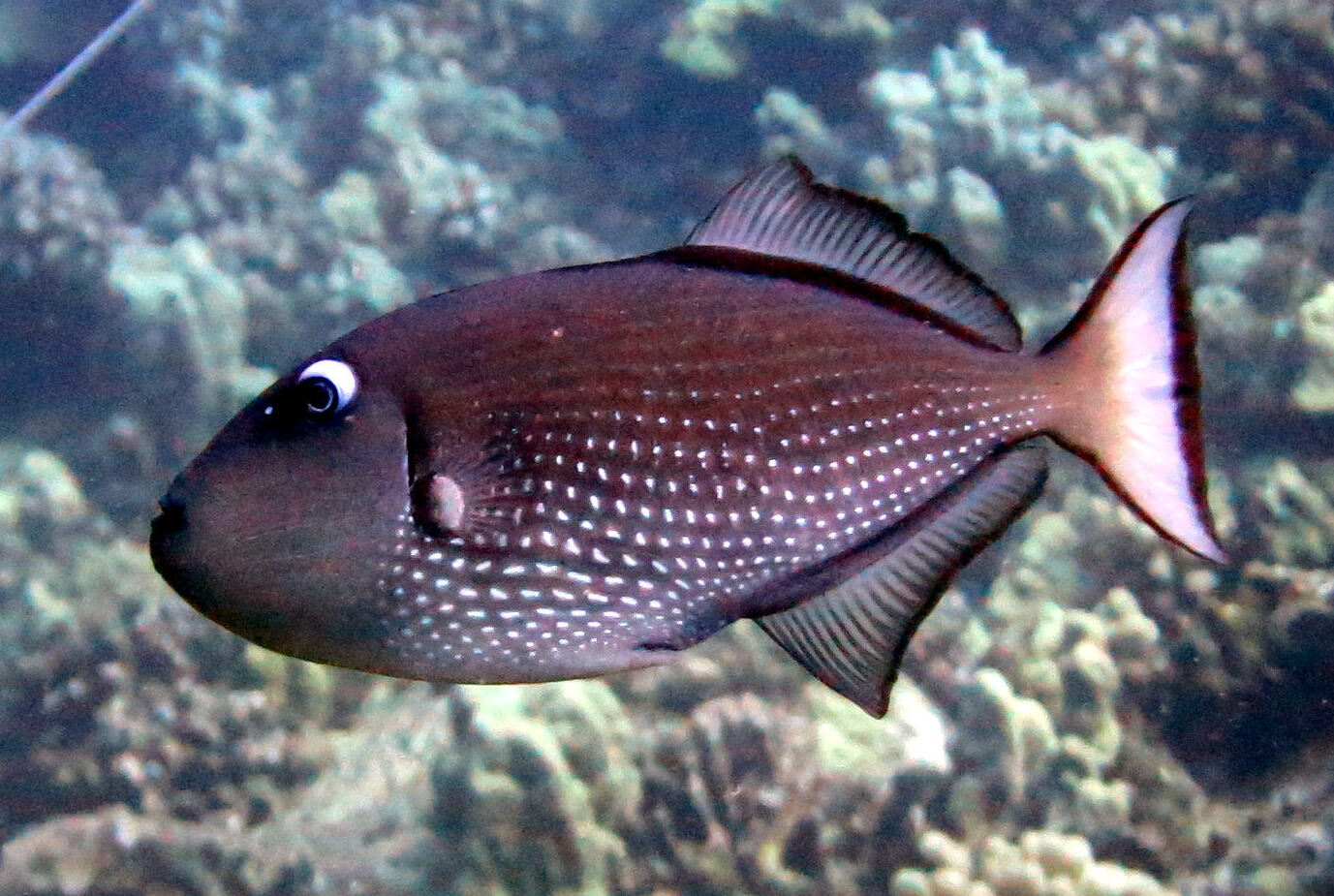
- Female

Conservation status
- Least Concern (IUCN 3.1)

Scientific classification
- Kingdom: Animalia
- Phylum: Chordata
- Class: Actinopterygii
- Division: Teleostei
- Order: Tetraodontiformes
- Family: Balistidae
- Genus: Xanthichthys
- Species: X. auromarginatus

Binomial name
- Xanthichthys auromarginatus (Bennett, 1832)
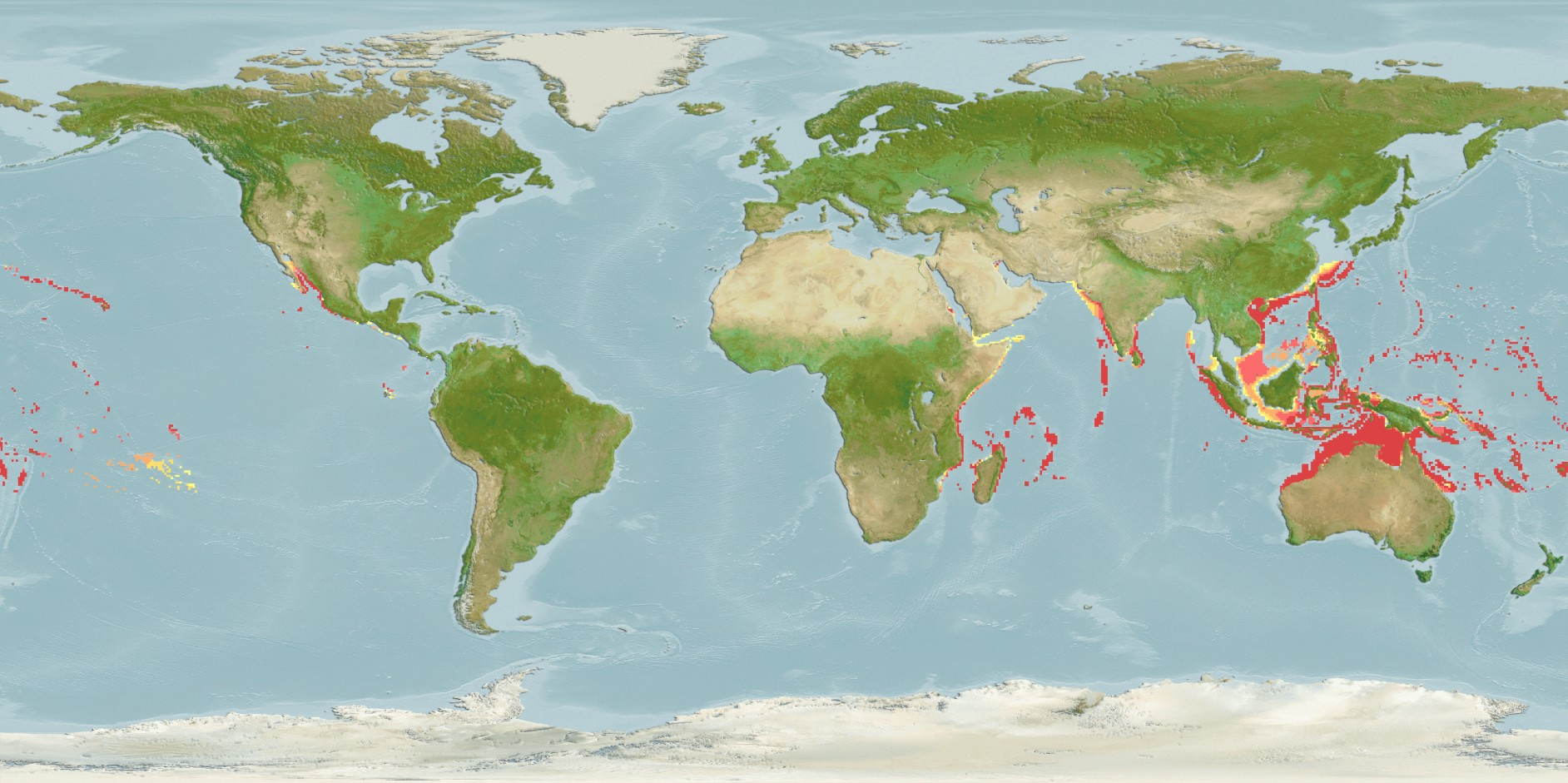
- Distribution of the gilded triggerfish

Synonyms
- Balistes auromarginatus Bennett, 1832; Balistes calolepis Hollard, 1843; Balistes gutturosus Hollard, 1854

= Gilded triggerfish =

Species of fish

The gilded triggerfish or blue-throated triggerfish (Xanthichthys auromarginatus) is a species of marine ray-finned fish in the triggerfish family Balistidae. It is found in the Indo-Pacific region.

== Description ==
=== Body form and coloration ===
The gilded triggerfish is a spotted brownish-gray triggerfish, although sometimes there is a bluish or lavender tint. It has a laterally compressed body, a small upturned mouth, and an emarginate caudal fin.

The rear three-quarters of the gilded triggerfish’s body has scales, each of which has a pale central white spot. It is a sexually dichromatic fish, meaning that males and females have different colorations; this is not common in other triggerfish species. The males have a distinctive blue cheek patch on the ventral part of their head in addition to yellow-bordered, white second dorsal, anal and caudal fins. Females do not possess the blue patch and the yellow-bordered fins; instead, the ventral part of the head is not very different in color from the dorsal part, and the three aforementioned fins all have a brown margin. Both sexes have dark brown lips and gill membranes in addition to a small white spot near the nostrils (nares).

From the lower and rear corners of the mouth almost to the upper pectoral-fin base, there are either five or six longitudinal cheek grooves that divide the scale rows on the cheek. These grooves are closer together and slope upward posteriorly. Compared to other triggerfish species, the cheek grooves are less pronounced and lack pigmentation. Additionally, the ridges along the scale rows sit further forward on the body and are considerably rougher and firmer to the touch.

=== Meristics ===
On average, the gilded triggerfish has 27 to 30 dorsal (soft) rays, 25 to 27 anal rays, and 12 to 14 pectoral rays, while having 42 to 47 body scale rows and 17 to 20 head scale rows.

=== Size ===
The genus to which the gilded triggerfish belongs, Xanthichthys, currently contains six species. The gilded triggerfish is the second smallest of them, ranging from about 10–30 cm. Its anal rays (longest ray 1.69–1.92 mm), pectoral fins (longest ray 2.18–2.91 mm), and second posterior fin are all shorter than the first dorsal fin, which is by far the longest. Moreover, the caudal fin (1.31–1.82 mm) is shorter and very weakly emarginate, curving slightly inward at the end (concavity: 4.10–8.20 mm). In order to search the reef for food and potential predators, they also possess small, high-set eyes (orbit diameter: 3.57–5.45 mm; interorbital width: 2.61–3.05 mm) that can move on their own. The depth of its body at the origin of the anal fin is 2.45-2.68 mm, the width of the body is 5.14–6.24 mm, head length is 2.79–3.29 mm, and snout length is 4.70–5.14 mm.

=== Trigger mechanism ===
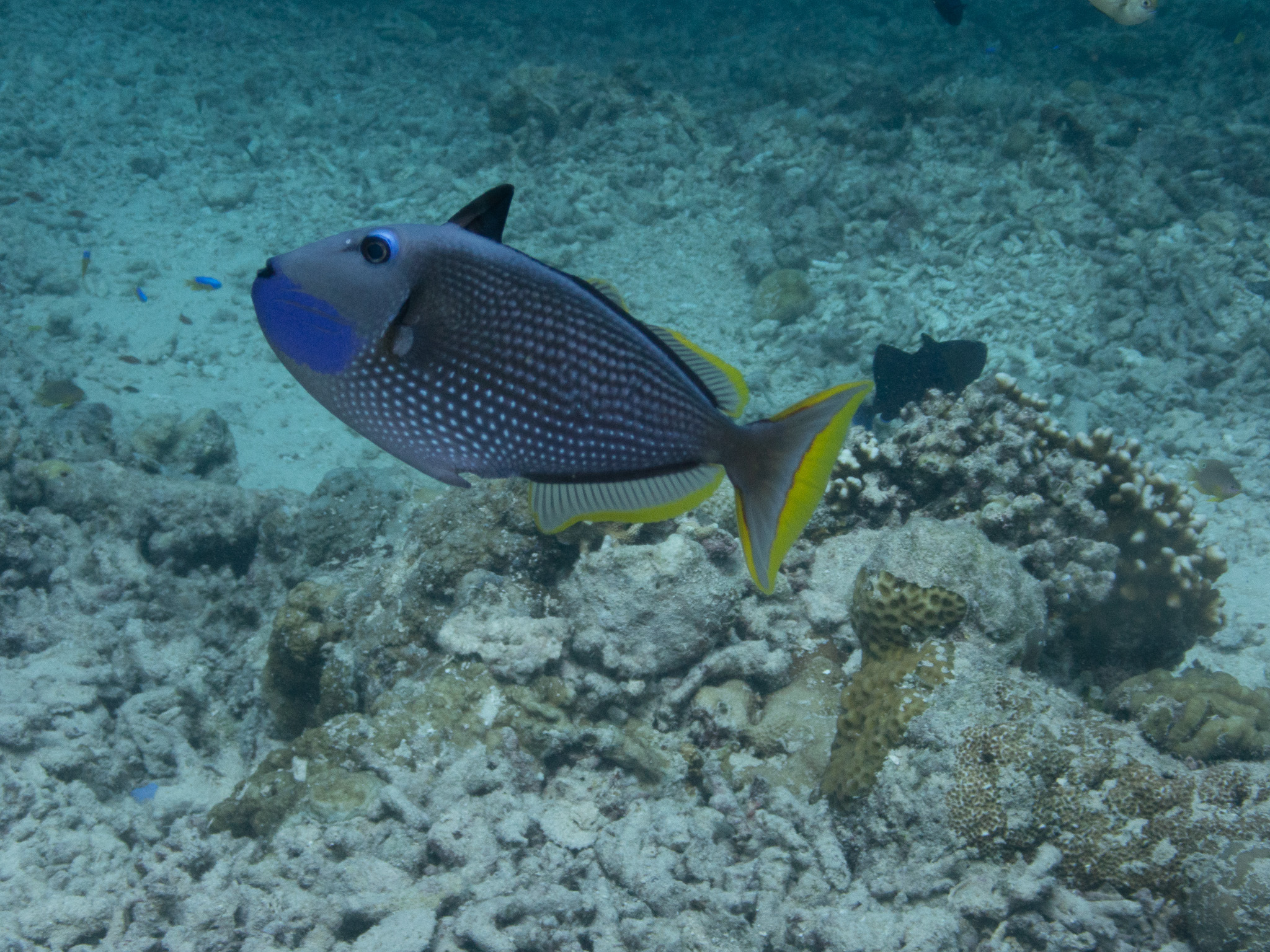
A male gilded triggerfish showcasing its erect first dorsal fin

When threatened, the glided triggerfish (as other triggerfish species) can erect the first (and longest) spine of their first dorsal fin, and the second spine of the same fin can be used to wedge itself into holes or crevices. This is an excellent strategy of discouraging predators, as the fish virtually locks itself within the crevice, preventing the predator from dragging it out. The fin will return flushed along the dorsal side when the threat has passed. People who catch triggerfish can depress the second spine, which in turn releases the mechanism, and the fin can be folded back down.

== Distribution and habitat ==
The gilded triggerfish can be found in the waters of the Indo-Pacific region, spanning from Eastern Africa in the western Indian Ocean to the Hawaiian islands longitudinally, and latitudinally from the Ryukyu Islands to New Caledonia. In particular, specimens have been found around the Maldive Islands, the Nicobar Islands, the islands of Micronesia and the Marshall Islands (first in 1978, at Kwajalein Atoll). Similar to most other triggerfish, this species can be located off of islands and reefs, but it may also venture out to more open waters.

While the usual depth range is between 20–50 m, the glided triggerfish may be spotted anywhere between 8–161 m. This fish is typically found toward the deeper end of the usual range, with it being rarer to find in depths above 20 m. Despite its preference for deeper depths, scuba divers can frequently spot this fish at recreational diving depths.

== Life history ==
=== Diet ===
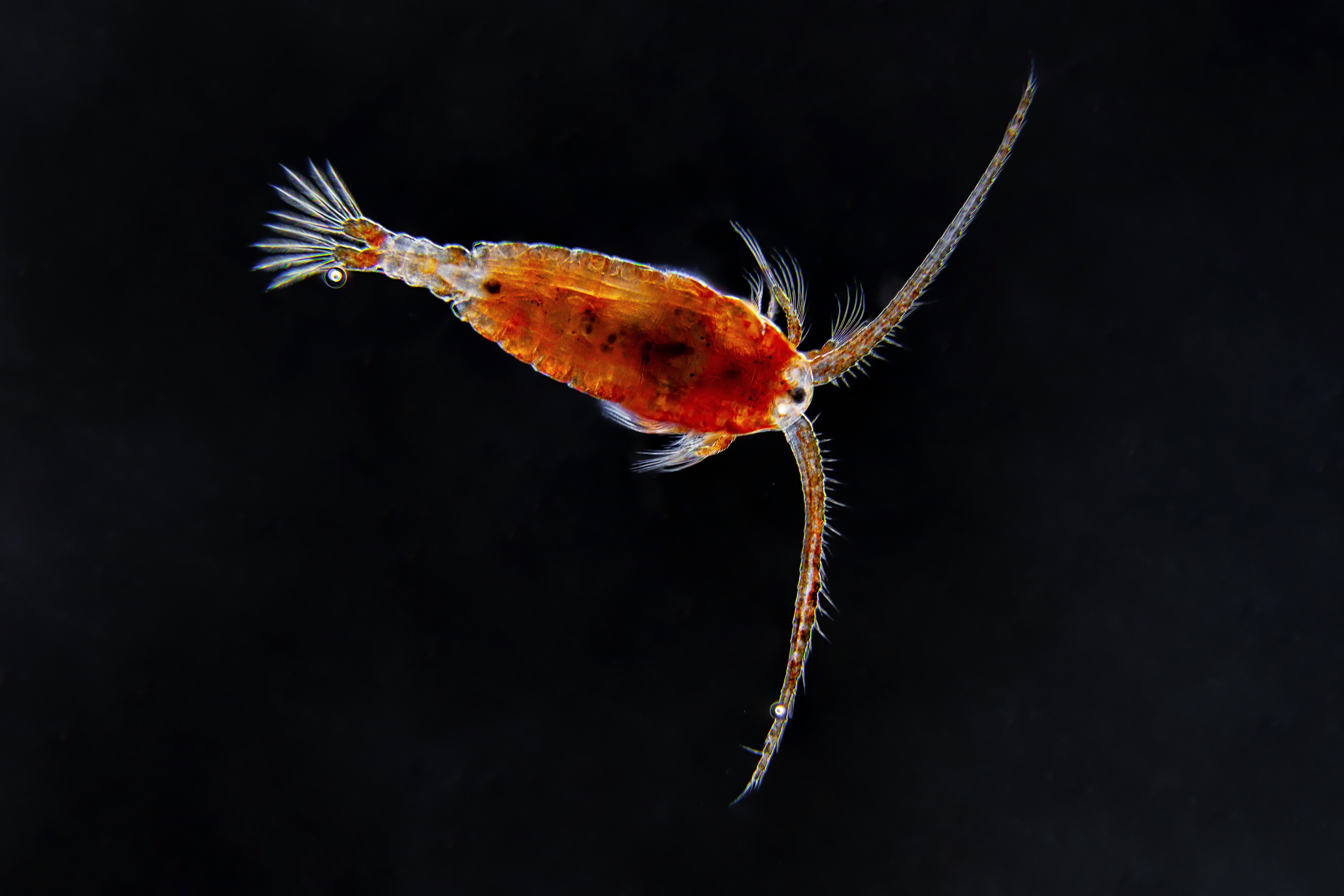
A calanoid copepod

Through examining the stomach contents of the gilded triggerfish, it was determined that their diet consisted exclusively of zooplankton, primarily calanoid copepods.

=== Movement ===
The median paired fin swimming technique is used by species in the triggerfish family, including the glided triggerfish. While this swimming method is most prevalent in triggerfish, it occurs also in flatfish and filefish (which forms a family related to the triggerfish family).

=== Reproduction ===
Reproduction in all species of the triggerfish family is roughly the same: through oviparity and consisting of a single male and female. The preferred spawning site is sandy substrates on reefs, with the usual spawning time being the early morning. A single female can release between 55,500 and 430,000 eggs during spawning, which happens in seconds, with the pair touching their abdomens and releasing the gametes into the water. Fertilized eggs attach to sand particles on the sea floor and are about 0.47–0.55 mm in diameter. Hatching of the eggs typically occurs in the evening of the day when they were laid. Both maternal and biparental care have been documented in the triggerfish family.

=== Territoriality ===
Setting up a territory is typical of triggerfish males, but can differ slightly in some species, depending on whether the site is temporary or permanent. In contrast, only some species have their females establish territories of their own as well. During mating, some females just visit males’ territories, while others reside there along with the male. Depending on the particular ecological conditions and geographical locations, territoriality and mating systems may alter.

=== Hypoxia tolerance ===
A 2018 study on the hypoxia tolerance examined the critical oxygen tension P_{crit} (i.e. the threshold below which oxygen uptake cannot be sustained to maintain the standard metabolic rate) of five coral reef-dwelling triggerfishes, including the gilded triggerfish; this is interesting because the habit of triggerfishes to hide in reef crevices during the night (to avoid predators) may leave them particularly prone to hypoxia. The glided triggerfish was found to have an P_{crit} of about 3.7 kPa, ranking third in the five species considered.

== Conservation status ==
According to the IUCN Red List, the gilded triggerfish is considered a species of Least Concern (LC), as it is a widely distributed fish with no known major threats that could lead to a population decline. Henceforth, there are no conservation measures taking place for this species.
