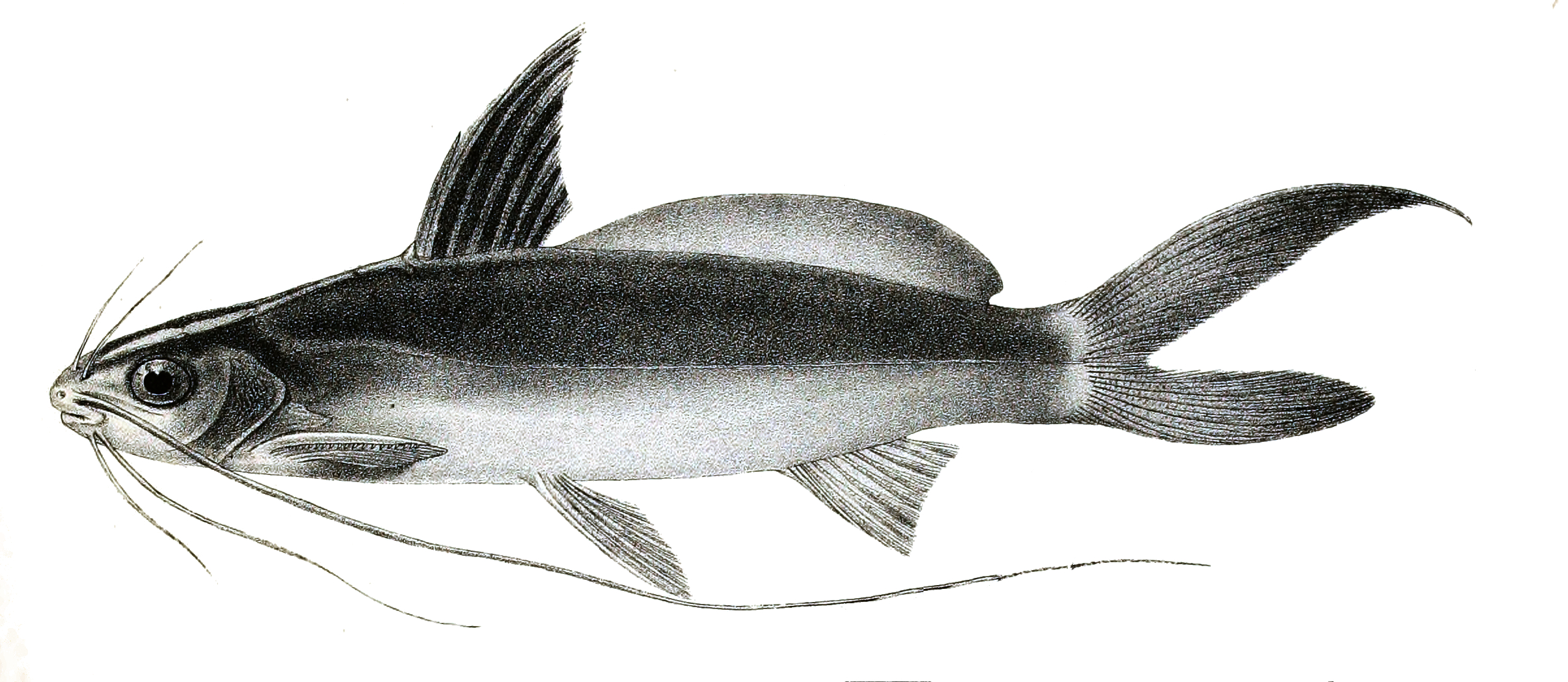

Conservation status
- Least Concern (IUCN 3.1)

Scientific classification
- Kingdom: Animalia
- Phylum: Chordata
- Class: Actinopterygii
- Order: Siluriformes
- Family: Bagridae
- Genus: Mystus
- Species: M. cavasius

Binomial name
- Mystus cavasius (Hamilton, 1822)

Synonyms
- Macrones nigriceps Peters, 1868; Pimelodus cavasius Hamilton, 1822; Aoria cavasius (Hamilton, 1822); Bagrus cavasius (Hamilton, 1822); Macrones cavasius (Hamilton, 1822); Hypselobagrus nigriceps (Peters, 1868); Mystus mukherjii Ganguly & Datta, 1975

= Mystus cavasius =

Species of fish

Mystus cavasius, the Gangetic mystus, is a species of catfish of the family Bagridae.

In the wild it is found in Indian subcontinent countries such as, India, Bangladesh, Pakistan, Sri Lanka, Nepal, and Myanmar. Reports of this species from the Mekong basins, Malaysia, and Indonesia are misidentifications of the species Mystus albolineatus or Mystus singaringan. Few populations are occur in Thailand, but only in the Salween basin.

It grows to a length of 40 cm. The pectoral spine of the species may give painful wounds and sometimes can be venomous.

The population is known to be decreasing in recent past, due to catching, pet trading and habitat destruction.
