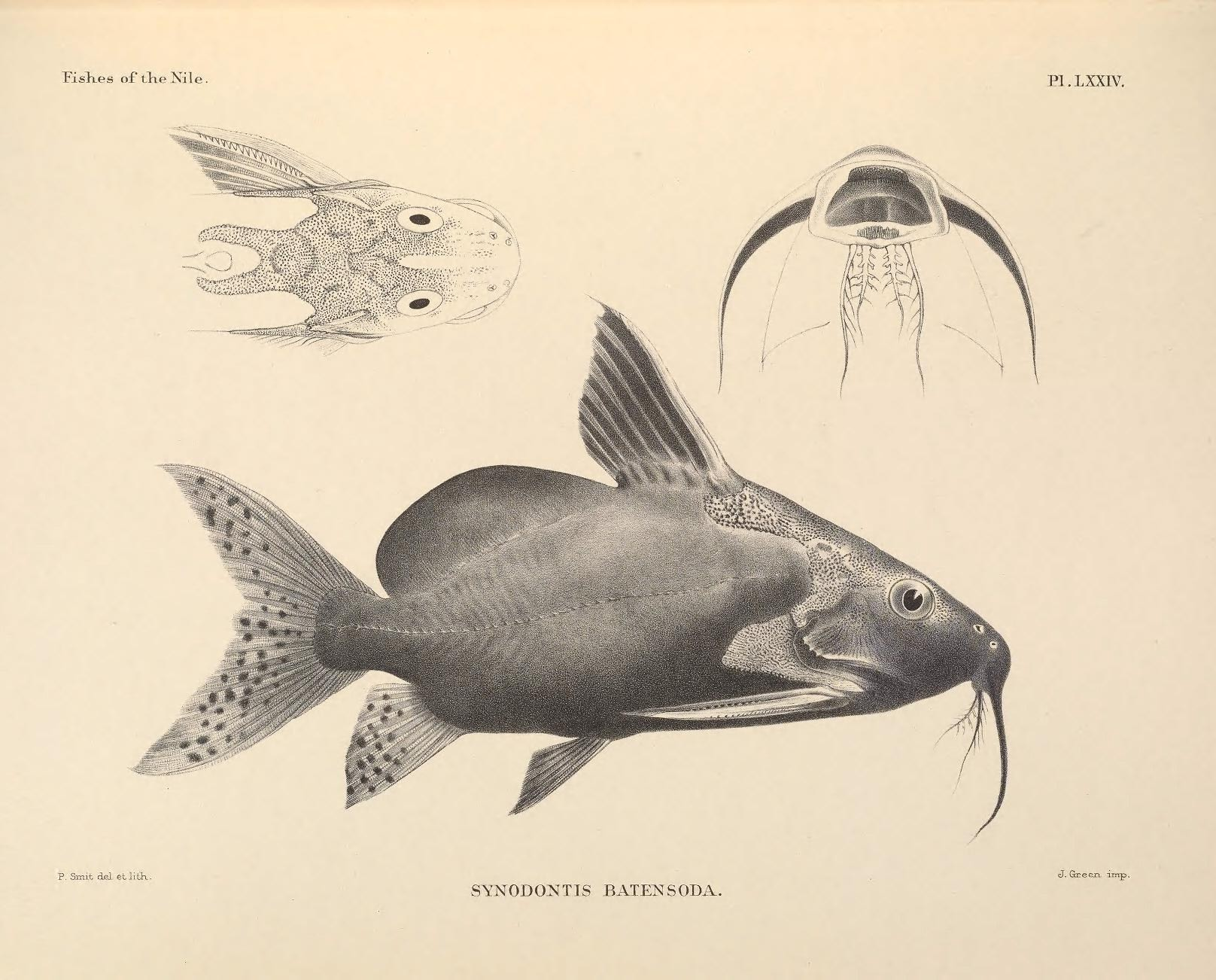

Conservation status
- Least Concern (IUCN 3.1)

Scientific classification
- Kingdom: Animalia
- Phylum: Chordata
- Class: Actinopterygii
- Division: Teleostei
- Order: Siluriformes
- Family: Mochokidae
- Genus: Synodontis
- Species: S. batensoda

Binomial name
- Synodontis batensoda (Rüppell, 1832)

Synonyms
- Synodontes ruppelli Swainson, 1838; Brachysynodontis batensoda (Rüppell, 1832)

= Synodontis batensoda =

Species of fish

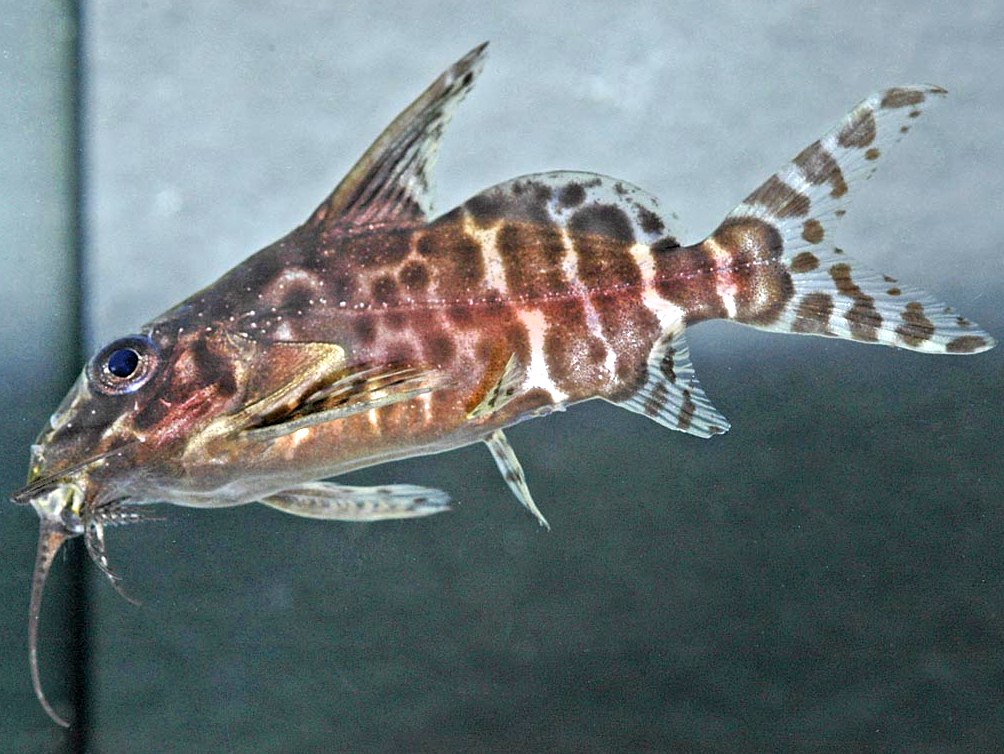

Synodontis batensoda, the upside-down catfish, is a species of mochokid upside-down catfish. It is unevenly distributed in inland waters across Africa from Senegal to Ethiopia, and is also known as a squeaker or giant upside-down catfish. It was originally described by Eduard Rüppell in 1832 in the paper "Continuation of the description and figure of several new fish, in the Nile. p1-14".

The species is now regionally extinct in Northern Africa, but used to be found in Cairo during floods. It can be found in portions of the White Nile, Blue Nile, and the Baro Rivers in northeast Africa, and the Chad, Niger, Senegal, and Gambia river basins in western Africa. It occurs in slow-moving waters and marshes bordering large rivers. Water temperatures in its native habitat range from 23 to 27 °C (73 to 81 °F).

As its common name implies, the upside-down catfish will swim upside-down. One theory accounts for this unusual behavior as a feeding strategy. In the wild, it often grazes on the undersides of submerged branches and logs, and swimming upside-down makes these areas more accessible. A different theory suggests swimming upside-down makes aquatic surface respiration more efficient.

Synodontis batensoda is silver-green to blue-grey with black barbels and a blackish underside (thus its specific name, from Arabic بطن السوداء bațn sawdā' = "black belly"). Occasionally, individuals can be reddish brown. Juveniles display large dark-colored blotches on the sides separated by pale patches.

It has 39–42 gill rakers rather than 7–33 as in other Synodontis species, and its dorsal fin and adipose fin are contiguous. The body is short and deep, the eyes are large, and its colouration is grey-black tinged with brown, with a faint network of dark black spots. There is a comb of small spines near the point of the operculum. The maxillary barbels have membranes, though these are not as wide as in Hemisynodontis. The caudal fin is forked, with each lobe ending in a point. Like other Synodontis species, this fish almost always swims upside down. This fish may grow up to 50 centimetres (20 in) TL and weigh up to 1.5 kilograms (3.3 lb).

This omnivorous fish feeds on plankton, algae, detritus, surface insects, chironomid larvae, benthic crustaceans, and molluscs. It is oviparous and venomous.

Those who practice the aquarium hobby find the fish to be peaceful and hardy, and compatible with even small fish. However, it may be bullied by more aggressive Synodontis species.
