= Upside-down catfish =

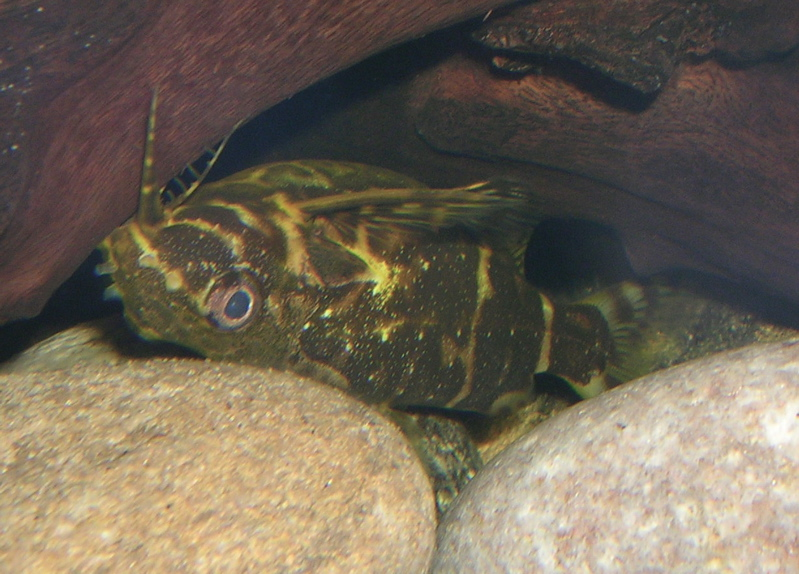
Synodontis nigriventris, shown here, is commonly confused with species such as Synodontis aterrimus, Synodontis contractus, and Synodontis nigrita, all of which may be sold to aquarists as the "upside-down catfish".

The name upside-down catfish is most commonly used by aquarists to refer to the mochokid catfish Synodontis nigriventris alternately known to ichthyologists as the blotched upside-down catfish or false upside-down catfish. However, a number of other fish may also be known by this name:

- Mystus leucophasis – Asian upside-down catfish
- Synodontis angelicus – spotted upside-down catfish
- Synodontis aterrima – sometimes sold as S. nigriventris in the aquarium trade, but in the past not identified as a separate species by retailers
- Synodontis batensoda- Brachysynodontis batensoda – known as giant upside-down catfish, or squeaker. Found in northern, northeast, and western Africa
- Synodontis contracta – big-nosed upside-down catfish, sometimes sold as S. nigriventris to aquarists, a species with which it is easily confused
- Synodontis nigrita – false upside-down catfish, very commonly sold as S. nigriventris in the aquarium trade and only recognised as a different species once the fish matures (adults are more than twice the size of adult S. nigriventris)

The name 'dwarf upside-down catfish' is also used for small (around 10 cm) species of the catfish genus Synodontis. In the aquarium trade, the name is almost always applied to S. nigriventris or species with which it may be confused, such as S. aterrima, S. contracta, and juvenile S. nigrita (adults of which are around 20 cm so are not "dwarf" species at all).

As its common name implies, the upside-down catfish will swim upside-down. One theory accounts for this unusual behavior as a feeding strategy. In the wild, it often grazes on the undersides of submerged branches and logs, and swimming upside-down makes these areas more accessible. A different theory suggests swimming upside-down makes aquatic surface respiration more efficient.
