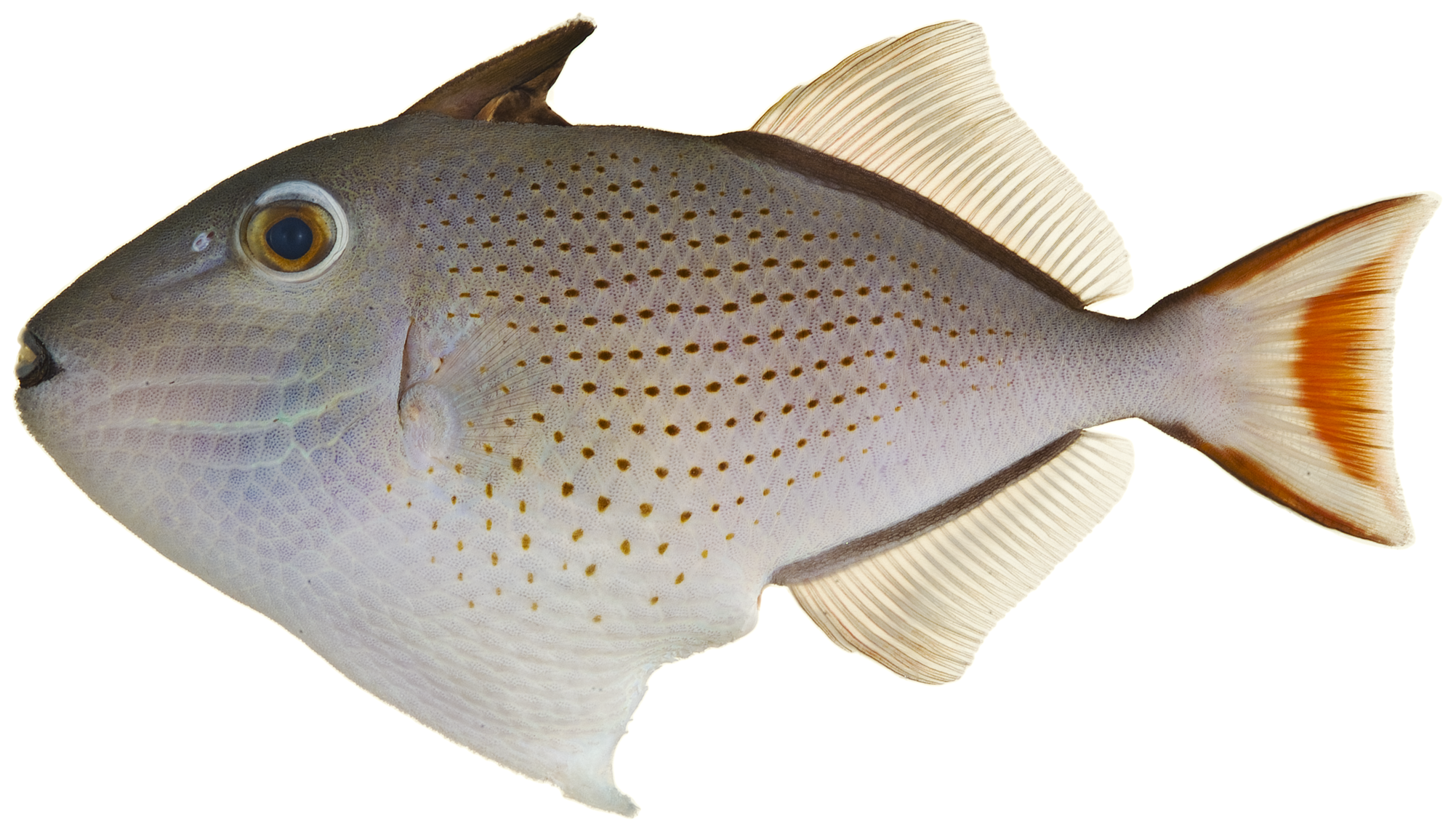

Conservation status
- Least Concern (IUCN 3.1)

Scientific classification
- Kingdom: Animalia
- Phylum: Chordata
- Class: Actinopterygii
- Order: Tetraodontiformes
- Family: Balistidae
- Genus: Xanthichthys
- Species: X. ringens

Binomial name
- Xanthichthys ringens (Linnaeus, 1758)

Synonyms
- Balistes cicatricosus Poey, 1860; Balistes curassavicus Gmelin, 1789; Balistes elongatus Hollard, 1854; Balistes heckelii von Müller, 1864; Balistes nigra Osbeck, 1771; Balistes nitidus Gronow, 1854; Balistes notatus Gronow, 1854; Balistes ringens Linnaeus, 1758

= Xanthichthys ringens =

Sargassum triggerfish

Species of fish

Xanthichthys ringens, the sargassum triggerfish or redtail triggerfish, is a species of triggerfish from the Western Atlantic, ranging from North Carolina through the Gulf of Mexico to the Lesser Antilles and Brazil. Like many other triggerfish, this fish occasionally makes its way into the aquarium trade.

== Description ==
Xanthichthys ringens is an oval-shaped fish with a robust build, and may reach 25 cm (9.8 in) in length. It has 3 dorsal spines, 26–29 dorsal soft rays and 23–27 anal soft rays. It is a light brownish to light blue fish with rows of dark spots (one on each scale) on the flanks, and there are three prominent silvery-blue grooves running obliquely from below and behind the mouth to (almost) the operculum. The caudal fin is pale with orange-red edging top, bottom and rear, and the second dorsal and anal-fin bases, as well as the membranes of the first dorsal fin, are dark brown.

== Habitat and biology ==
Xanthichthys ringens adults live on tropical marine reefs at depths between 0 and 190 m (0 and 623 ft), but usually are found between 30 and 60 m (98 and 197 ft). Juveniles live among floating Sargassum, hence one of its common names. This fish lives solitarily or in small groups, and is among the most common fish in some places. It feeds on crabs, shrimp, sea urchins and zooplankton.

== Gallery ==
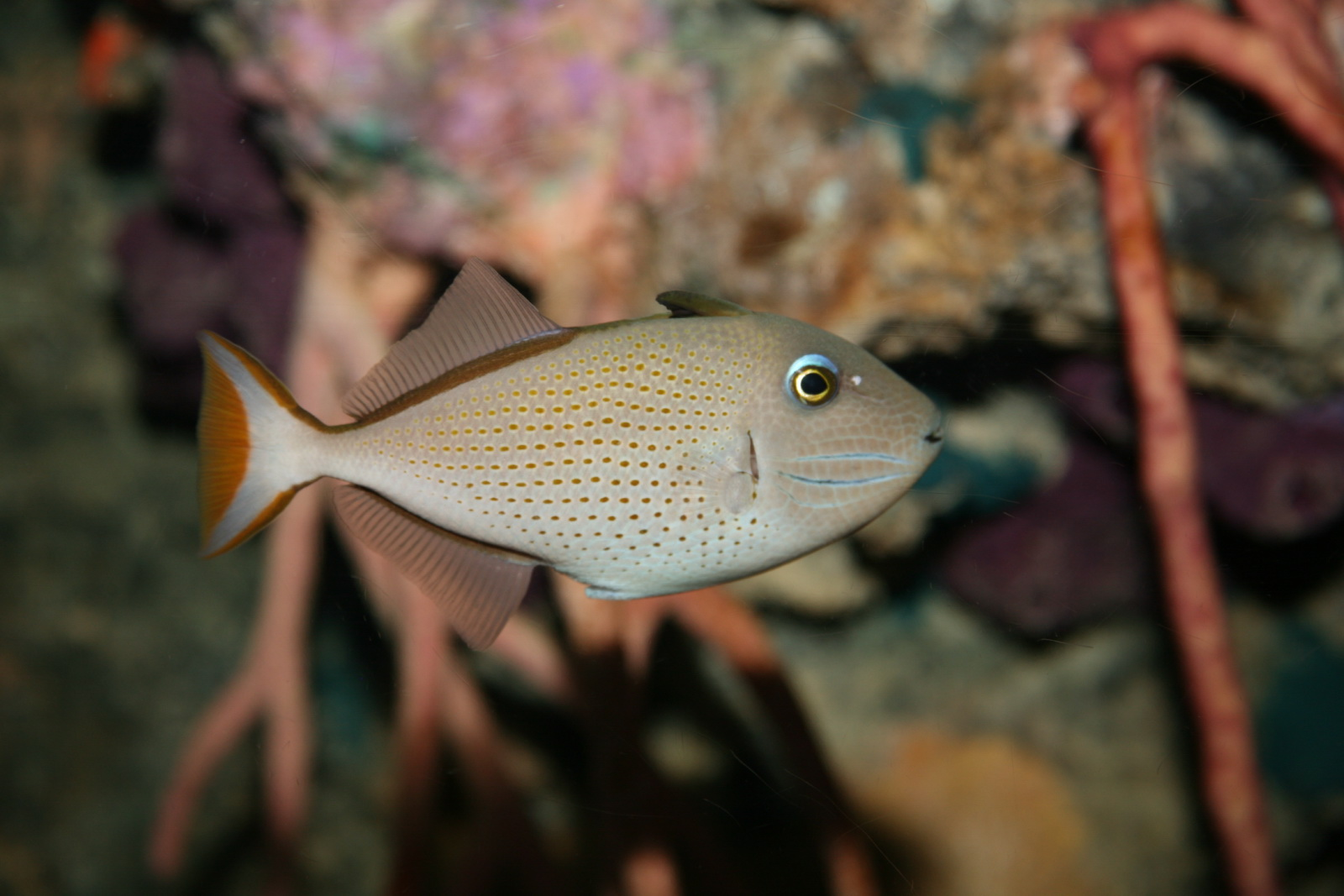

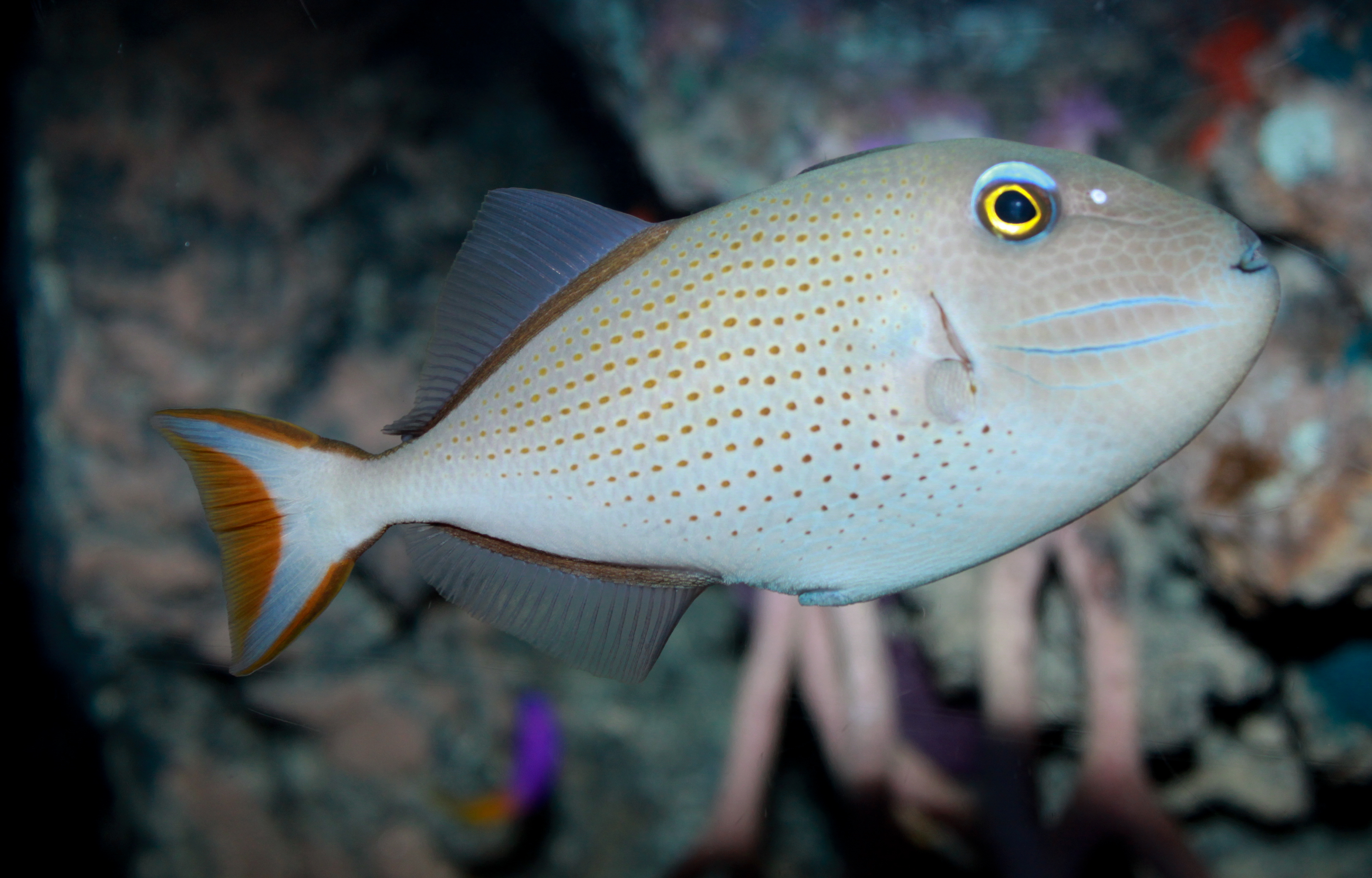

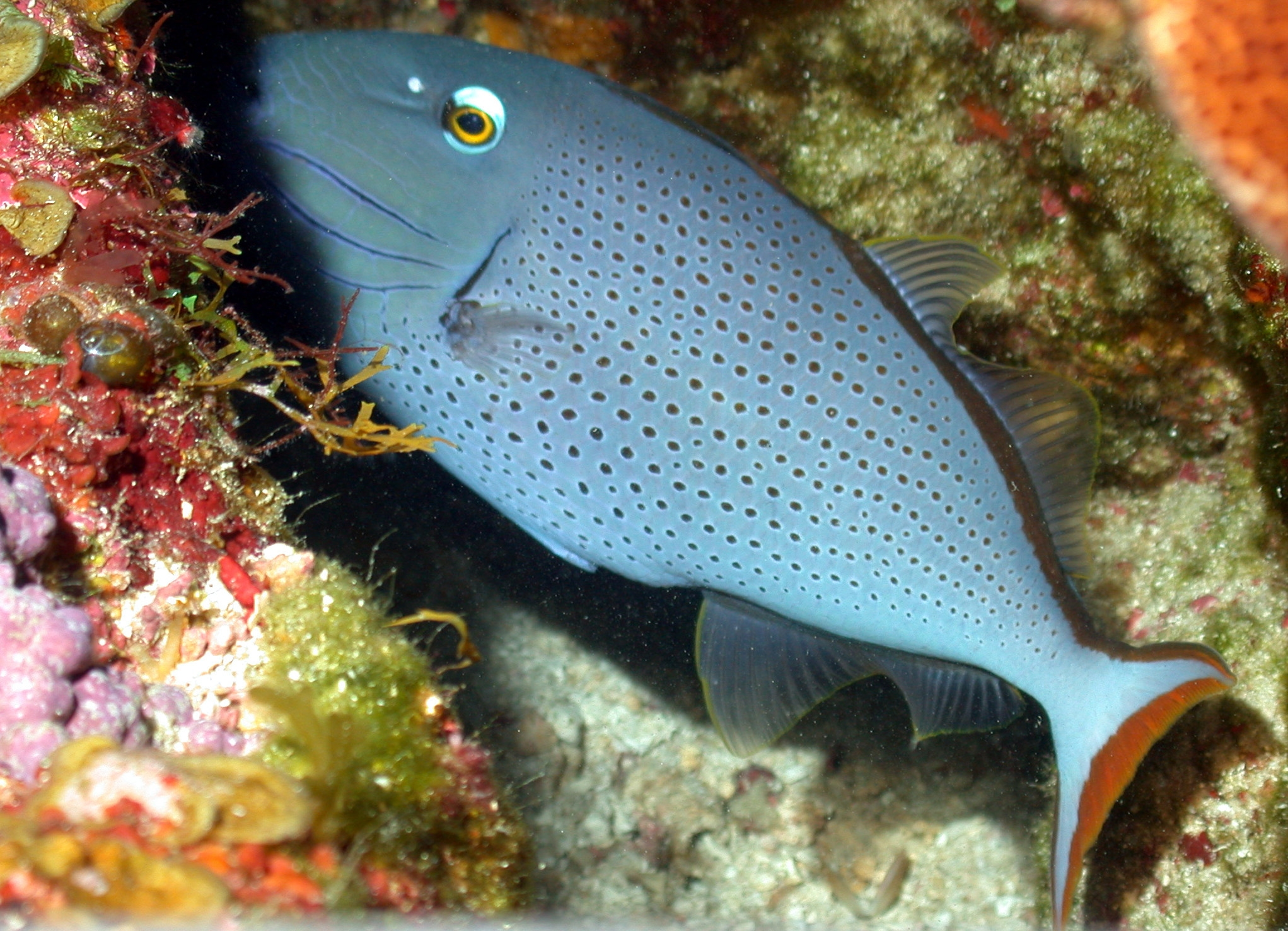
