= Mystus atrifasciatus =

Conservation status
- Least Concern (IUCN 3.1)

Scientific classification
- Kingdom: Animalia
- Phylum: Chordata
- Class: Actinopterygii
- Order: Siluriformes
- Family: Bagridae
- Genus: Mystus
- Species: M. atrifasciatus

Binomial name
- Mystus atrifasciatus Fowler, 1937

Species of fish

Mystus atrifasciatus (known locally as trey kanchos chhnoht) is a species of catfish endemic to Cambodia, Laos, Thailand and Vietnam, known from Mekong River, Chao Phraya River and Mae Klong River and was described from Phitsanulok, Thailand. It inhabits rivers, streams and reservoirs and moves to floodplains when the water level increases and can also be found near submerged woody vegetation. It feeds on crustaceans and zooplankton along with some algae and fish scales. It is commonly fished and marketed and is also found in the aquarium trade. It may be threatened by pollution and overfishing and more research is needed about the species.
