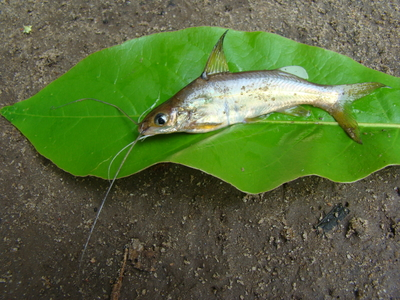
- Mystus gulio
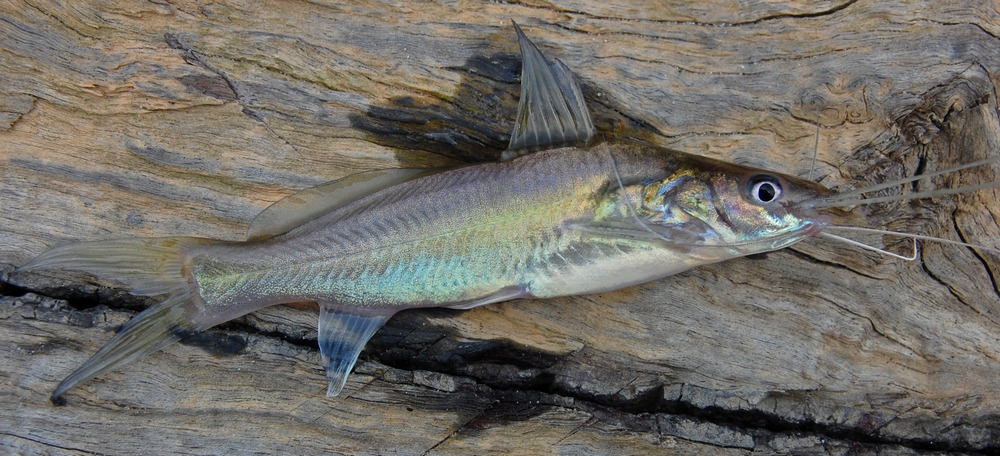
- Mystus castaneus

Scientific classification
- Kingdom: Animalia
- Phylum: Chordata
- Class: Actinopterygii
- Division: Teleostei
- Order: Siluriformes
- Family: Bagridae
- Genus: Mystus; Scopoli, 1777

Type species
- Bagrus pelusius Solander, 1794

Synonyms
- Aspidobagrus Bleeker, 1862; Heterobagrus Bleeker, 1864; Hypselobagrus Bleeker, 1862; Prajadhipokia Fowler, 1934

= Mystus =

Genus of fishes

Mystus is a genus of fish in the family Bagridae native to Asia. Phylogenetic relationships within this genus are poorly understood, though it has been suggested that there are two major lineages.

== Species ==
There are currently 52 recognized species in this genus:

- Mystus abbreviatus (Valenciennes, 1840)
- Mystus alasensis H. H. Ng & Hadiaty, 2005
- Mystus albolineatus T. R. Roberts, 1994
- Mystus ankutta Pethiyagoda, N. K. A. Silva & Maduwage, 2008
- Mystus armatus (F. Day, 1865)
- Mystus atrifasciatus Fowler, 1937
- Mystus bimaculatus (Volz, 1904)
- Mystus bleekeri (F. Day, 1877)
- Mystus bocourti (Bleeker, 1864)
- Mystus canarensis S. Grant, 1999
- Mystus carcio (F. Hamilton, 1822)
- Mystus castaneus H. H. Ng, 2002
- Mystus catapogon Plamoottil, 2016
- Mystus cavasius (F. Hamilton, 1822)
- Mystus celator Ng & Kottelat, 2023
- Mystus cineraceus H. H. Ng & Kottelat, 2009
- Mystus cyrusi Esmaeili, Sayyadzadeh, Zarei, Eagderi & Mousavi-Sabet, 2022
- Mystus dibrugarensis (B. L. Chaudhuri, 1913)
- Mystus falcarius Chakrabarty & H. H. Ng, 2005
- Mystus gulio (F. Hamilton, 1822)
- Mystus heoki Plamoottil & Abraham, 2013
- Mystus horai Jayaram, 1954
- Mystus impluviatus H. H. Ng, 2003
- Mystus indicus Plamoottil & Abraham, 2013
- Mystus irulu Vijayakrishnan and Praveenraj. 2022
- Mystus karipat Gray, 1831 (incertae sedis in Notopterinae)
- Mystus keletius (Valenciennes, 1840)
- Mystus keralai Plamoottil, 2014 (Kerala Mystus)
- Mystus leucophasis (Blyth, 1860)
- Mystus malabaricus (Jerdon, 1849)
- Mystus menoni Plamoottil, 2013 (Idukki Mystus)
- Mystus misrai Anuradha, 1986
- Mystus montanus (Jerdon, 1849)
- Mystus multiradiatus T. R. Roberts, 1992
- Mystus mysticetus T. R. Roberts, 1992
- Mystus nanus Sudasinghe, Pethiyagoda, Maduwage & Meegaskumbura, 2016
- Mystus ngasep Darshan, Vishwanath, Mahanta & Barat, 2011
- Mystus nigriceps (Valenciennes, 1840)
- Mystus oculatus (Valenciennes, 1840)
- Mystus pelusius (Solander, 1794)
- Mystus prabini Darshan, Abujam, Humar, Parhi, Singh, et al. 2019
- Mystus pulcher (B. L. Chaudhuri, 1911)
- Mystus punctifer H. H. Ng, Wirjoatmodjo & Hadiaty, 2001
- Mystus rhegma Fowler, 1935
- Mystus rubripinnis Vanarajan & Arunachalam, 2018
- Mystus rufescens (Vinciguerra, 1890)
- Mystus seengtee (Sykes, 1839)
- Mystus singaringan (Bleeker, 1846)
- Mystus tengara (F. Hamilton, 1822)
- Mystus velifer H. H. Ng, 2012
- Mystus vittatus (Bloch, 1794)
- Mystus wolffii (Bleeker, 1851)
- Mystus zeylanicus H. H. Ng & Pethiyagoda, 2013

Synonyms

- Mystus armiger Ng, 2004; valid as M. wolffii
- Mystus chinensis (Steindachner, 1883); valid as Hemibagrus guttatus (Lacepède, 1803)
- Mystus pahangensis Herre, 1940; valid as Hemibagrus capitulum (Popta, 1906)
- Mystus ascita Walbaum, 1792; valid as Pimelodus maculatus Lacepède, 1803
- Mystus ascita Gronow in Gray, 1854; valid as Platydoras costatus (Linnaeus, 1758)
