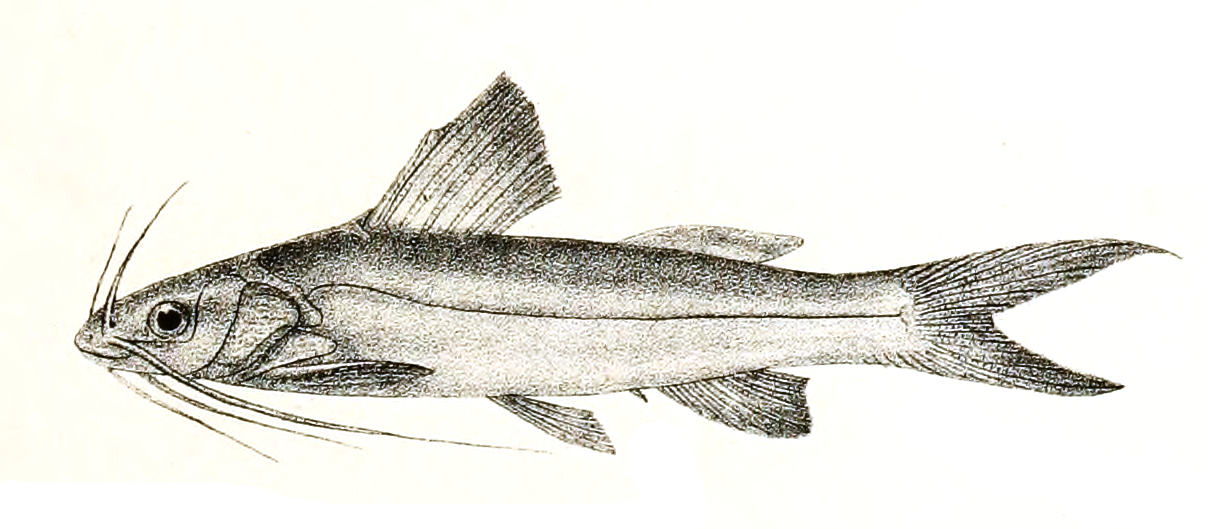

Conservation status
- Least Concern (IUCN 3.1)

Scientific classification
- Kingdom: Animalia
- Phylum: Chordata
- Class: Actinopterygii
- Order: Siluriformes
- Family: Bagridae
- Genus: Mystus
- Species: M. keletius

Binomial name
- Mystus keletius (Valenciennes, 1840)

Synonyms
- Bagrus keletius Valenciennes, 1840

= Mystus keletius =

Species of fish

Mystus keletius, is a species of catfish of the family Bagridae. It is native to India and Sri Lanka.

This species grows to a maximum length of 18 centimetres. It lives in rivers and ponds, often amidst vegetation in muddy waters. It is considered to be a rare species, but it has a wide distribution, so it is listed as a least-concern species on the IUCN Red List.
