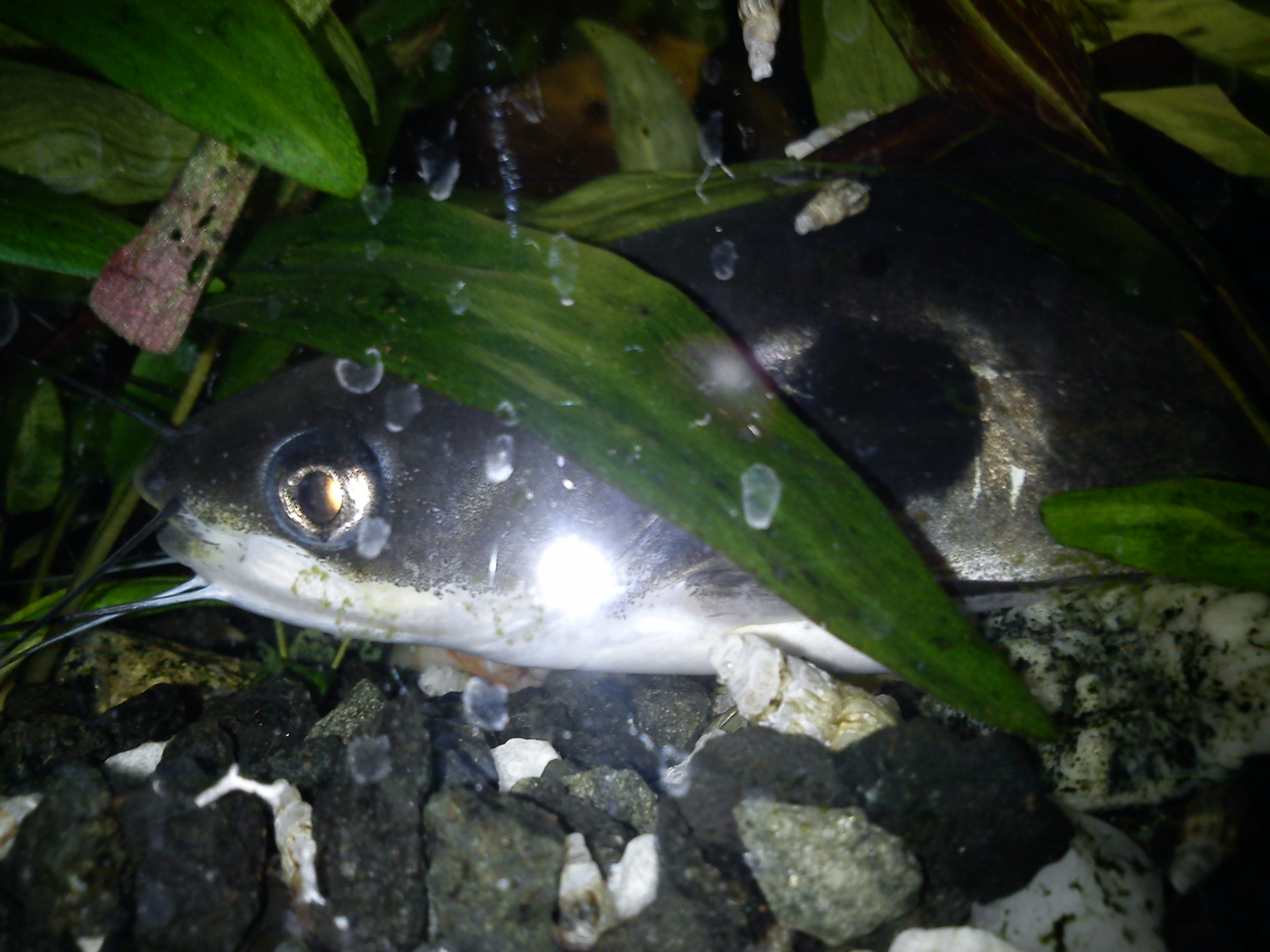

Scientific classification
- Kingdom: Animalia
- Phylum: Chordata
- Class: Actinopterygii
- Order: Siluriformes
- Family: Bagridae
- Genus: Mystus
- Species: M. nigriceps

Binomial name
- Mystus nigriceps (Valenciennes, 1840)

Synonyms
- Bagrus nigriceps Valenciennes, 1840; Bagrus micracanthus Bleeker, 1846; Hypselobagrus micracanthus (Bleeker, 1846); Mystus micracanthus (Bleeker, 1846)

= Mystus nigriceps =

Two-spot catfish

Species of fish

Mystus nigriceps, the two-spot catfish, is a species of catfish of the family Bagridae. The species was available in aquarium circles without a scientific name until a connection was made to a description of Mystus micracanthus by the ichthyologist Bleeker, in 1846. The artist's impression at that time showed a catfish without any obvious markings, although another researcher in the early 1940s described it with two body spots. M. micracanthus is a junior synonym of M. nigriceps.

In the wild it is found in Cambodia, Indonesia, Laos, Malaysia, Singapore and Thailand.

It grows to a length of 19.8 cm and feeds on zooplankton and insect larvae in the wild, and most prepared foods in aquariums. It is not safe to keep them with smaller fish in the aquarium as they will eat them.
