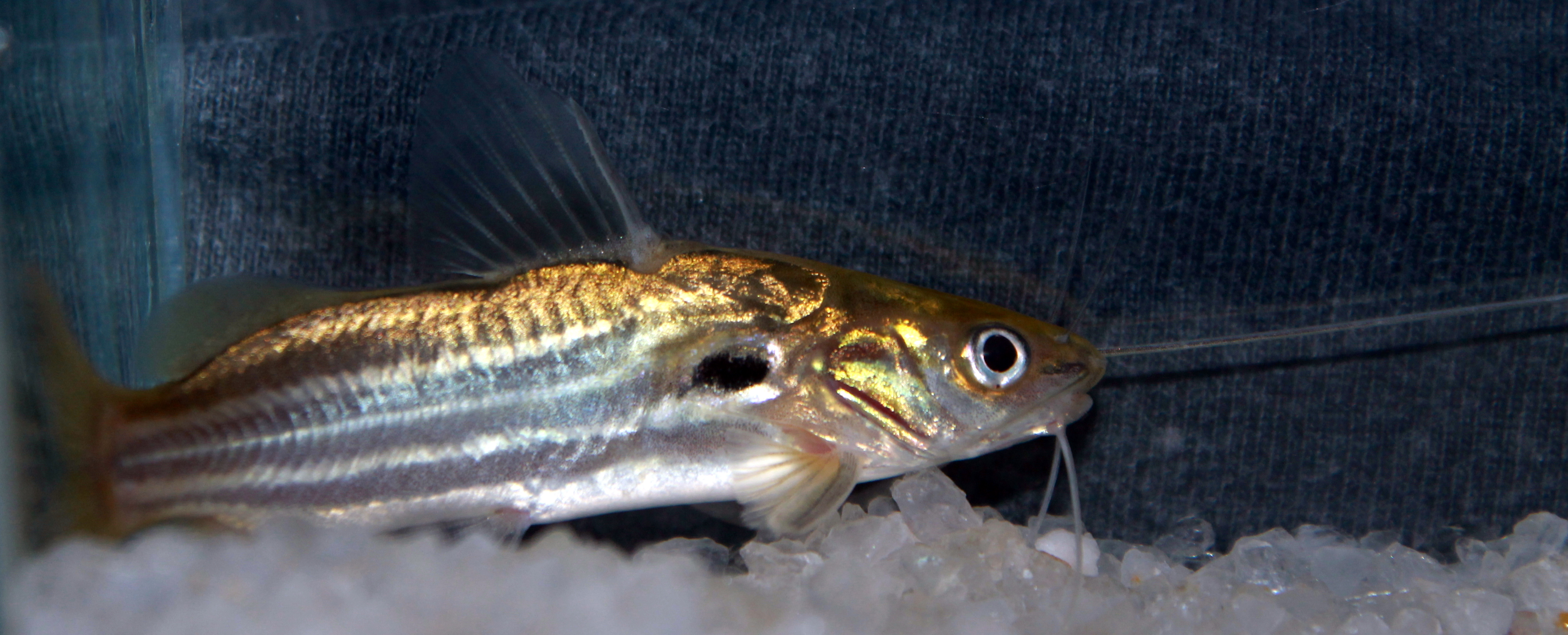
- Lateral view

Conservation status
- Least Concern (IUCN 3.1)

Scientific classification
- Kingdom: Animalia
- Phylum: Chordata
- Class: Actinopterygii
- Division: Teleostei
- Order: Siluriformes
- Family: Bagridae
- Genus: Mystus
- Species: M. tengara

Binomial name
- Mystus tengara Hamilton, 1822

= Mystus tengara =

Species of fish

Mystus tengara is a species of freshwater catfish belonging to the genus Mystus, of the family Bagridae. It is a native of South Asia, and was originally described by Francis Buchanan-Hamilton in 1822.

== Description ==
Mystus tengara can reach up to 18 cm in total length. It has an elongated and slightly compressed body, with a depressed head. The dorsal fin is long and extends up to the head, keeping the head out. The pectoral fin has 10–13 denticulations and is stronger than the dorsal fin. It is used as an offensive organ. There are 4–5 longitudinal bands along the sides of the body. The adipose fin is longer lower, and the caudal fin is forked. The body is yellow or brown in color, with a dark spot on the shoulder. There are 4 pairs of barbels, and the mouth is subterminal.

== Habitat and distribution ==
Mystus tengara inhabits both flowing and standing waters. It is distributed in the Indus, plain and adjoining hilly areas of Pakistan, Northern and Central India, Bangladesh, Nepal, and Afghanistan, and can be obtained through cast nets and traps.
