= Mystus ankutta =

Conservation status
- Endangered (IUCN 3.1)

Scientific classification
- Kingdom: Animalia
- Phylum: Chordata
- Class: Actinopterygii
- Order: Siluriformes
- Family: Bagridae
- Genus: Mystus
- Species: M. ankutta

Binomial name
- Mystus ankutta Pethiyagoda, Silva & Maduwage, 2008

Species of fish

Mystus ankutta, also known as the Sri Lanka dwarf catfish or yellow dwarf catfish, is a species of catfish of the family Bagridae that is endemic to Sri Lanka. In the wild it is found in freshwater bodies from Kelani river to Nilwala river in Sri Lanka.

It grows to a length of 7.9 cm. This fish is classified as endangered by the IUCN.
