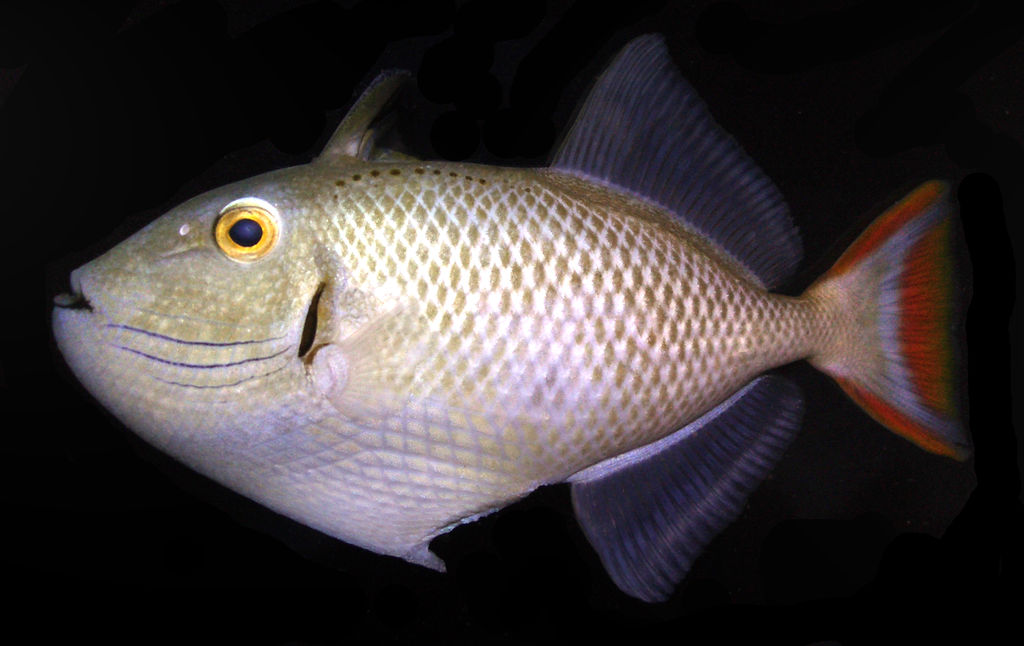

Conservation status
- Data Deficient (IUCN 3.1)

Scientific classification
- Kingdom: Animalia
- Phylum: Chordata
- Class: Actinopterygii
- Order: Tetraodontiformes
- Family: Balistidae
- Genus: Xanthichthys
- Species: X. greenei

Binomial name
- Xanthichthys greenei Pyle & Earle, 2013

= Xanthichthys greenei =

Kiri triggerfish

Species of triggerfish

Xanthichthys greenei, also known as the Kiri triggerfish, is a relatively new species of triggerfish first identified in 2005 from Kiritimati (Christmas Island) atoll, Kiribati. It is abundant on coral rubble and holes adjacent to deeper drop-offs at several localities of the coasts of Kiritimati. It has always been observed near the reef substratum, where it would seek shelter when approached.

== Description ==
The fish was first spotted at a mesophotoic depth of 90 to 100 m (295–330 ft) at the Kiritimati of the Line Islands. Brian Greene caught the first specimen with his bare hands when he was scuba diving.
