= Mystus pelusius =

Conservation status
- Least Concern (IUCN 3.1)

Scientific classification
- Kingdom: Animalia
- Phylum: Chordata
- Class: Actinopterygii
- Order: Siluriformes
- Family: Bagridae
- Genus: Mystus
- Species: M. pelusius

Binomial name
- Mystus pelusius (Solander, 1794)

Synonyms
- Silurus pelusius Solander, 1794; Bagrus halepensis Valenciennes, 1840; Macrones aleppensis Günther, 1864; Macrones colvillii Günther, 1874; Mystus halepensis colvillii (Günther, 1874)

Species of fish

Mystus pelusius, is a species of catfish of the family Bagridae. It is native to Iraq, Turkey and Iran.

This species grows to a maximum length of 17 centimetres (6.7 in). It lives in rivers and ponds, often amidst vegetation in muddy waters. It is considered to be a rare species, but it has a wide distribution, so it is listed as a least-concern species on the IUCN Red List.
