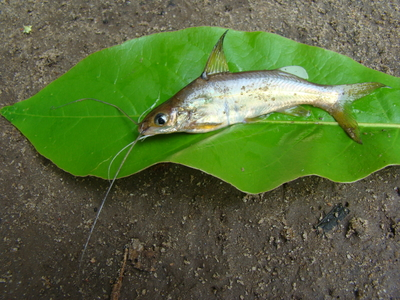

Conservation status
- Least Concern (IUCN 3.1)

Scientific classification
- Kingdom: Animalia
- Phylum: Chordata
- Class: Actinopterygii
- Order: Siluriformes
- Family: Bagridae
- Genus: Mystus
- Species: M. gulio

Binomial name
- Mystus gulio (Hamilton, 1822)

Synonyms
- Aspidobagrus gulio; Bagrus albilabrus; Bagrus gulio; Macrones gulio; Pimelodus gulio; Pseudobagrus gulio

= Mystus gulio =

Long Whiskers Catfish

Species of fish

Mystus gulio, the Long Whiskers Catfish, is a species of catfish of the family Bagridae. The generic name is probably derived from the Latin "mystax", meaning "moustache", due to the long barbels.

It is found in India, Sri Lanka, Pakistan, Nepal and Vietnam. It is primarily a brackish water fish that enters and lives in fresh water.

The population is known to be decreasing in recent past, due to catching, pet trading and habitat destruction.
