= Mystus falcarius =

Conservation status
- Least Concern (IUCN 3.1)

Scientific classification
- Kingdom: Animalia
- Phylum: Chordata
- Class: Actinopterygii
- Order: Siluriformes
- Family: Bagridae
- Genus: Mystus
- Species: M. falcarius

Binomial name
- Mystus falcarius Chakrabarty and Ng, 2005

Species of fish

Mystus falcarius is a species of catfish endemic to India and Myanmar and is known only from Irrawaddy River, Great Tenasserim River and Chindwin River. The exact population is not known but is thought to be abundant and no exact threats are known thus Least Concern by the IUCN; it is fished for food.
