= Mystus bocourti =

Conservation status
- Vulnerable (IUCN 3.1)

Scientific classification
- Kingdom: Animalia
- Phylum: Chordata
- Class: Actinopterygii
- Order: Siluriformes
- Family: Bagridae
- Genus: Mystus
- Species: M. bocourti

Binomial name
- Mystus bocourti (Bleeker, 1864)

Synonyms
- Heterobagrus bocourti Bleeker, 1864; Prajadhipokia rex Fowler, 1934

Species of fish

Mystus bocourti is a species of catfish endemic to Cambodia, Laos, Thailand and Vietnam, known only from Chao Phraya River and Mekong River. It was formerly listed as Heterobagrus bocourti until the genus Heterobagrus became Mystus. It is demersal and potamodromus and occurs in medium to large rivers. The fish considered rare and declining throughout its range and is threatened by pollution, present and future dams and water extraction for agriculture and human settlements. Considering this and no present conservation measures, the fish is listed as Vulnerable.
