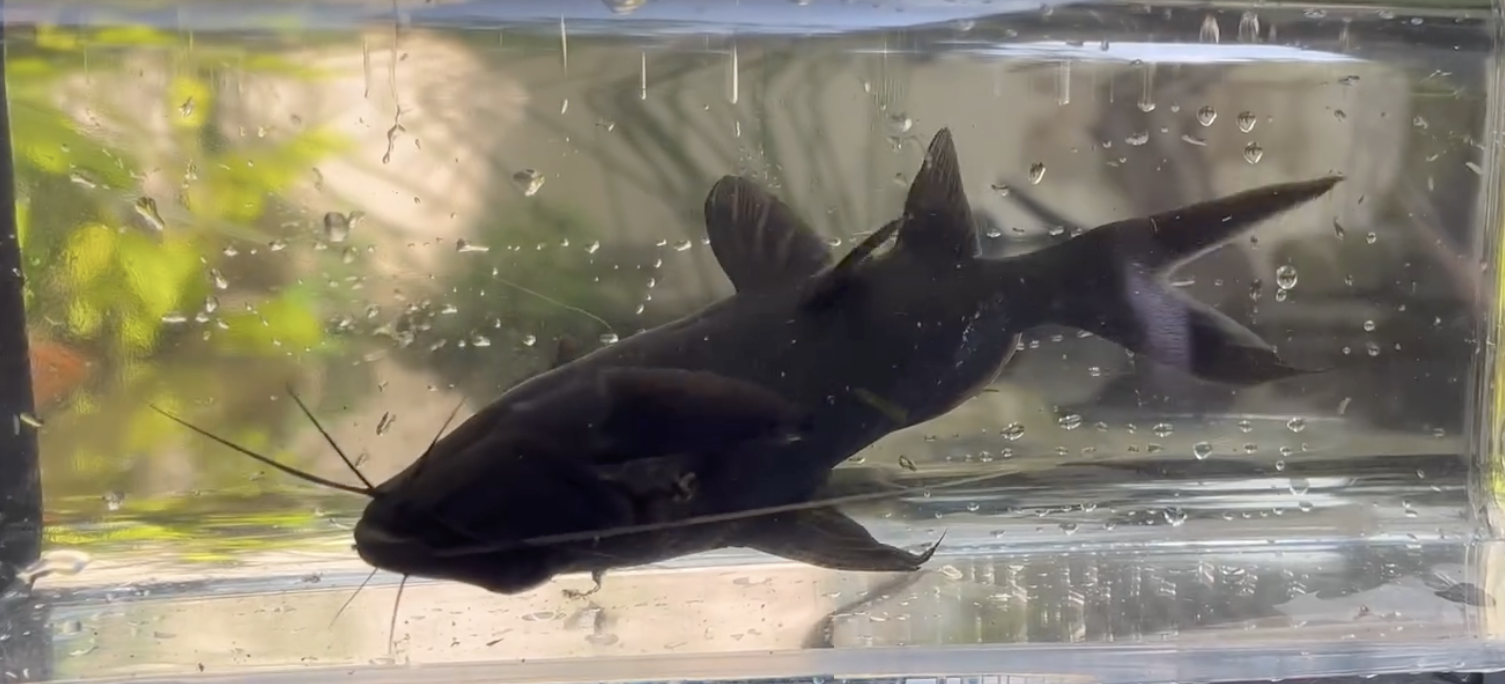

Conservation status
- Least Concern (IUCN 3.1)

Scientific classification
- Domain: Eukaryota
- Kingdom: Animalia
- Phylum: Chordata
- Class: Actinopterygii
- Order: Siluriformes
- Family: Bagridae
- Genus: Mystus
- Species: M. leucophasis

Binomial name
- Mystus leucophasis (Blyth, 1860)

Synonyms
- Bagrus leucophasis Blyth, 1860; Macrones leucophasis (Blyth, 1860)

= Mystus leucophasis =

Species of fish

Mystus leucophasis is an Asian species of upside-down catfish belonging to the family Bagridae. It is known for its unusual behaviour, as it primarily swims in an inverted position and never upright.

Mystus leucophasis originate in the Sittang and other rivers of Myanmar. These catfish can grow to more than 1 foot (30 cm) in length. They are commercially fished for human consumption as well as being found in the aquarium trade. When kept in the aquarium they cannot be kept with smaller "community" fish as they will eat them.
