= Mystus bimaculatus =

Scientific classification
- Domain: Eukaryota
- Kingdom: Animalia
- Phylum: Chordata
- Class: Actinopterygii
- Order: Siluriformes
- Family: Bagridae
- Genus: Mystus
- Species: M. bimaculatus

Binomial name
- Mystus bimaculatus (Volz, 1904)

Synonyms
- Macrones bimaculatus Volz, 1904

Species of fish

Mystus bimaculatus is a species of catfish from the genus Mystus.

== Appearance ==
Mystus bimaculatus has overall red-brown body and two dark markings on the shoulder and caudal peduncle.

== Distribution ==
These fish can be found in Indonesia, more specifically on Sumatra.

== Conservation status ==
This fish is classified as a near threatened species.
