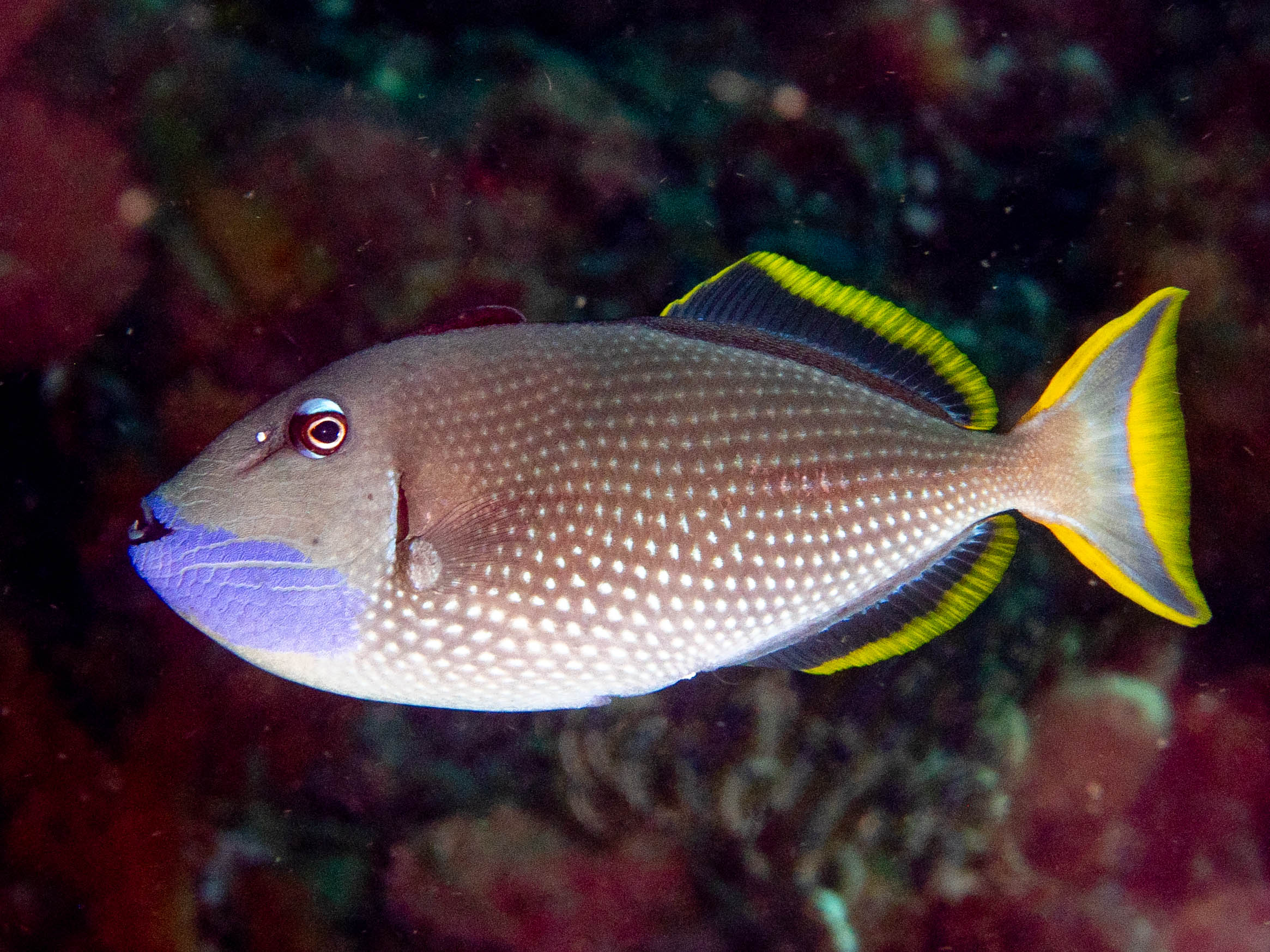
- Xanthichthys auromarginatus
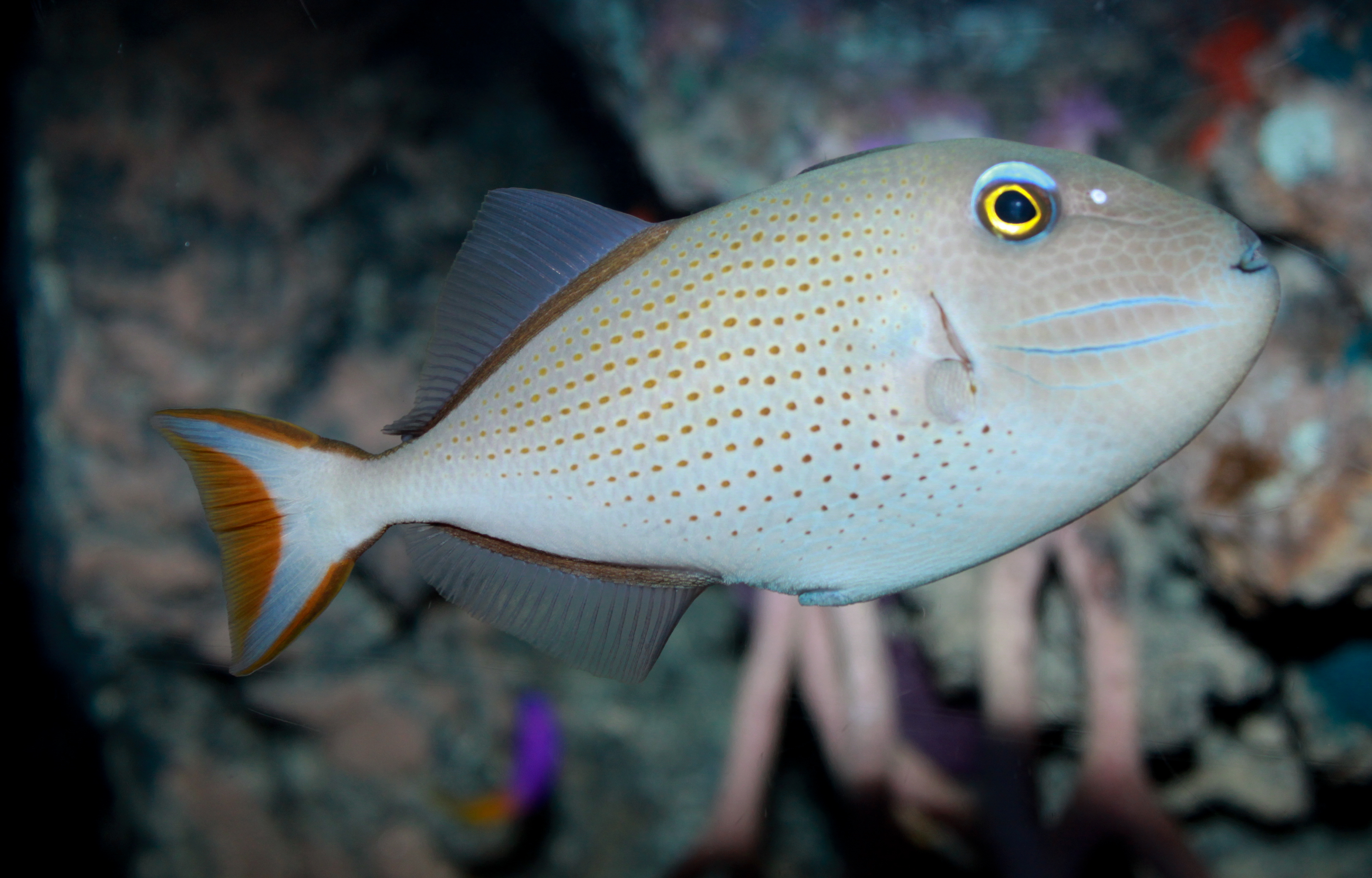
- Xanthichthys ringens

Scientific classification
- Kingdom: Animalia
- Phylum: Chordata
- Class: Actinopterygii
- Order: Tetraodontiformes
- Family: Balistidae
- Genus: Xanthichthys; Kaup, 1856

Type species
- Balistes curassavicus J. F. Gmelin, 1789

= Xanthichthys =

Genus of fishes

Xanthichthys is a genus of triggerfishes native to reef environments in the western Atlantic Ocean, Indian Ocean, and Pacific Ocean.

== Species ==
Six recognized species are placed in this genus:

| Image | Scientific name | Common name | Distribution |
|---|---|---|---|
| | X. auromarginatus E. T. Bennett, 1832 | gilded triggerfish | Indo-Pacific. |
| | X. caeruleolineatus J. E. Randall, Matsuura & Zama, 1978 | outrigger triggerfish | Indo-West Pacific. |
| | X. greenei Pyle & Earle, 2013 | Kiri triggerfish | Pacific Ocean |
| | X. lineopunctatus Hollard, 1854 | striped triggerfish | South Africa eastward through northern Australia to New Guinea, north to southern Japan. |
| | X. mento D. S. Jordan & C. H. Gilbert, 1882 | redtail triggerfish | Pacific. |
| | X. ringens Linnaeus, 1758 | sargassum triggerfish | e Western Atlantic, ranging from North Carolina (USA) to Brazil. |
