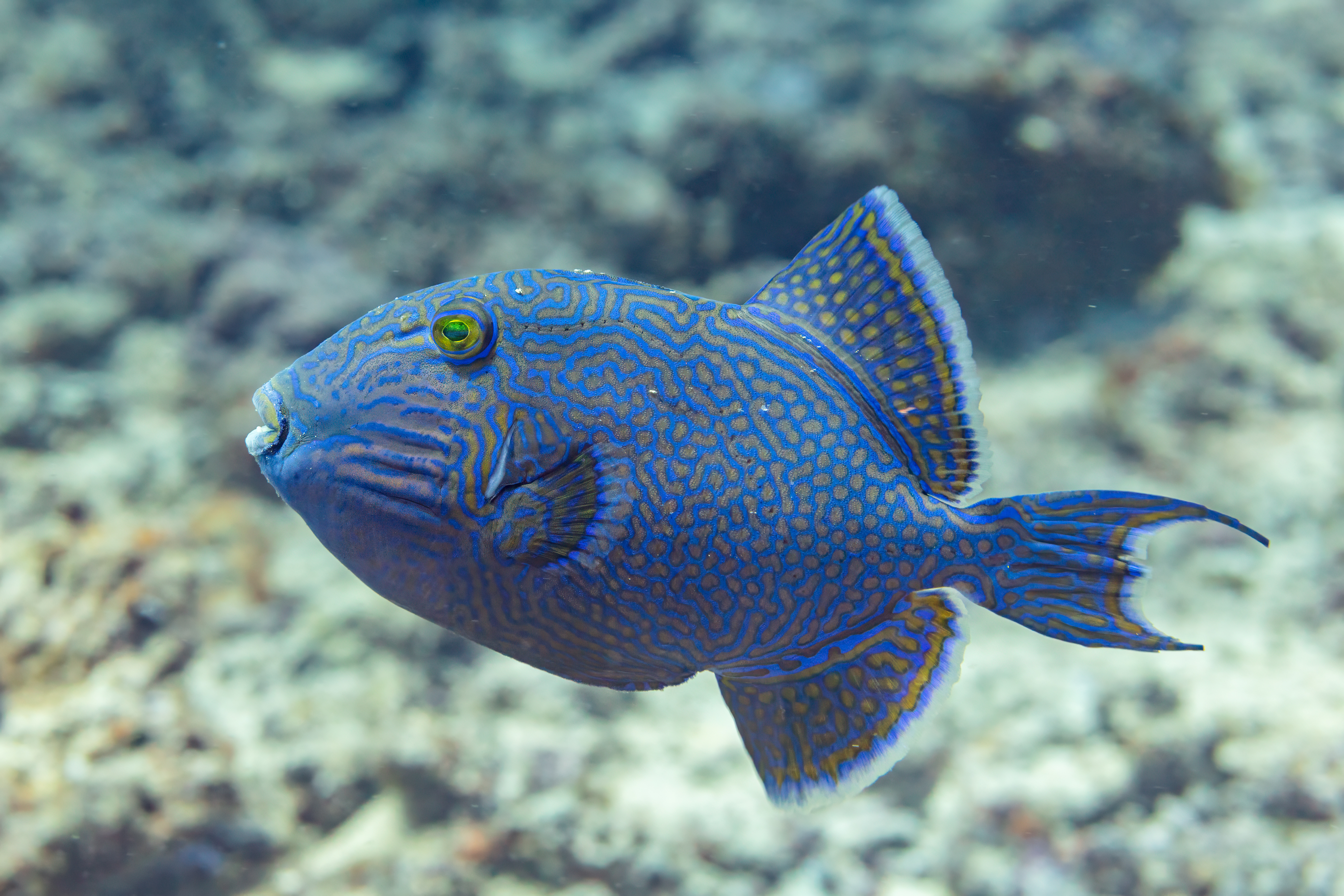
- At Madagascar

Conservation status
- Least Concern (IUCN 3.1)

Scientific classification
- Kingdom: Animalia
- Phylum: Chordata
- Class: Actinopterygii
- Division: Teleostei
- Order: Tetraodontiformes
- Family: Balistidae
- Genus: Pseudobalistes
- Species: P. fuscus

Binomial name
- Pseudobalistes fuscus (Bloch & J. G. Schneider, 1801)

Synonyms
- Balistes caerulescens, Rüppell, 1829; Balistes fuscus, Bloch & Schneider, 1801; Balistes rivulatus, Rüppell, 1837

= Pseudobalistes fuscus =

Species of fish

Pseudobalistes fuscus (common names: blue triggerfish, rippled triggerfish, yellow-spotted triggerfish and blue-and-gold triggerfish) is a fish belonging to the family Balistidae.

== Distribution ==
This species is widespread in the Tropical Indo-Pacific, from the Red Sea to South Africa, Society Islands, southern Japan, Australia and New Caledonia.

== Description ==
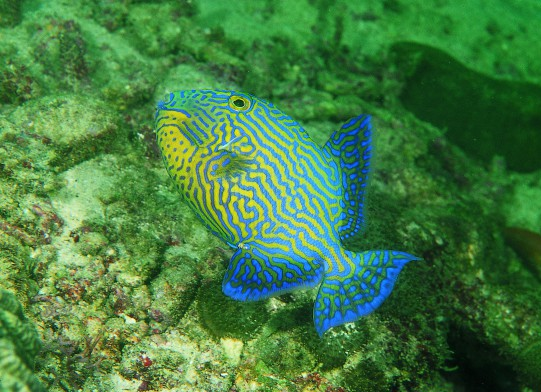
Juvenile

Pseudobalistes fuscus can reach a length of 55 centimetres (22 inches) in males. The body is mainly brown, but fins have yellow margins. Juveniles are yellowish brown with a network of brilliant bluish wavy lines. With growth these lines become interconnected.

== Habitat ==
Pseudobalistes fuscus is a reef-associated species. It prefers coastal waters, shallow lagoons and seaward reefs, at 30–50 metres (98–164 ft) of depth.

== Diet ==
This triggerfish, like most other triggerfish, eats shellfish, small crustaceans, and other bottom-dwelling invertebrates.

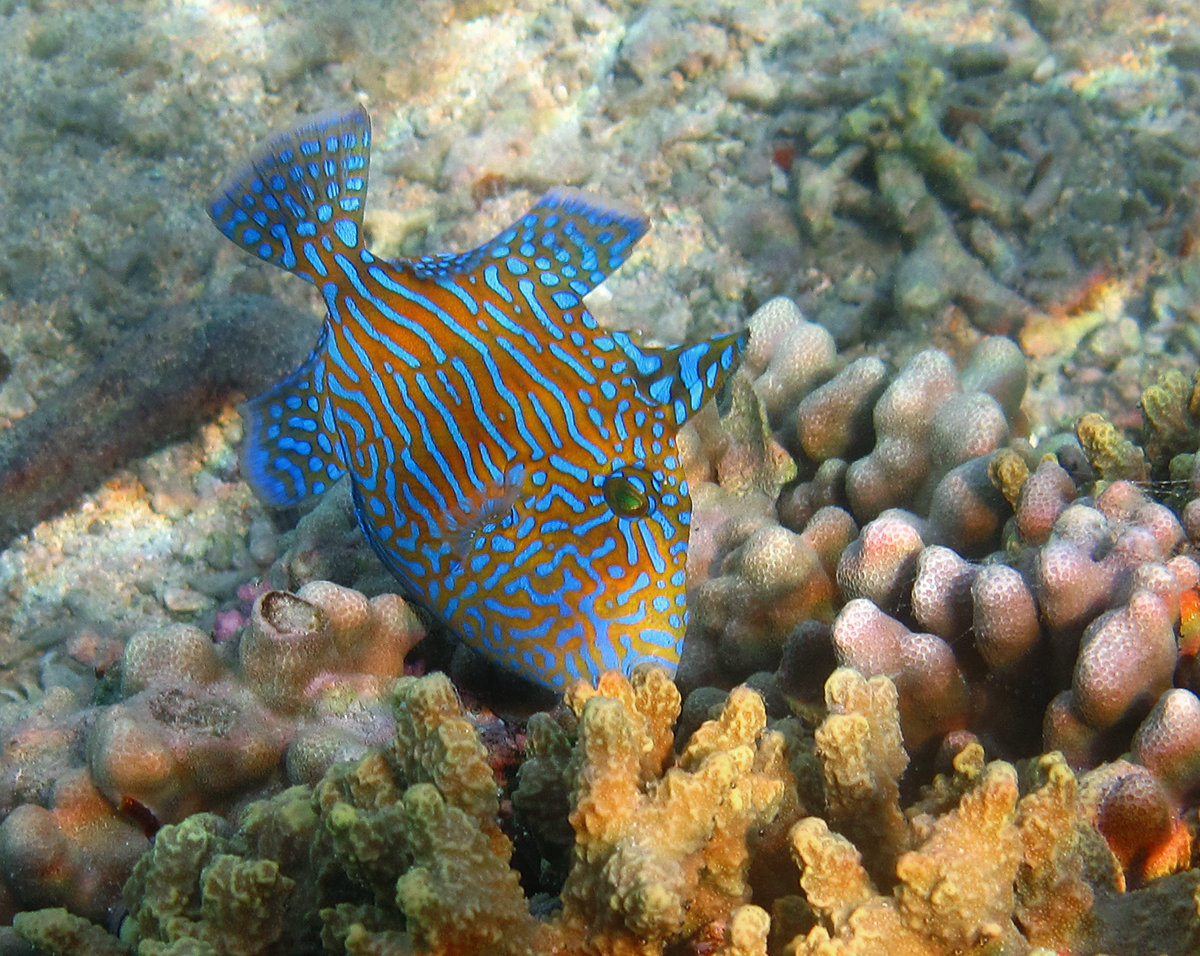
Juvenile

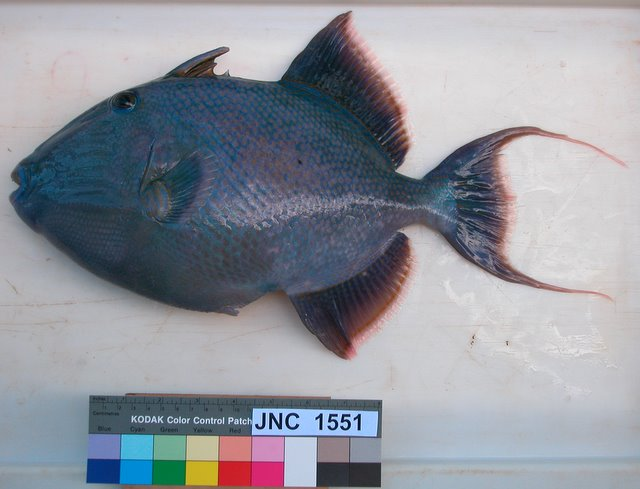
With scale bar, in New Caledonia

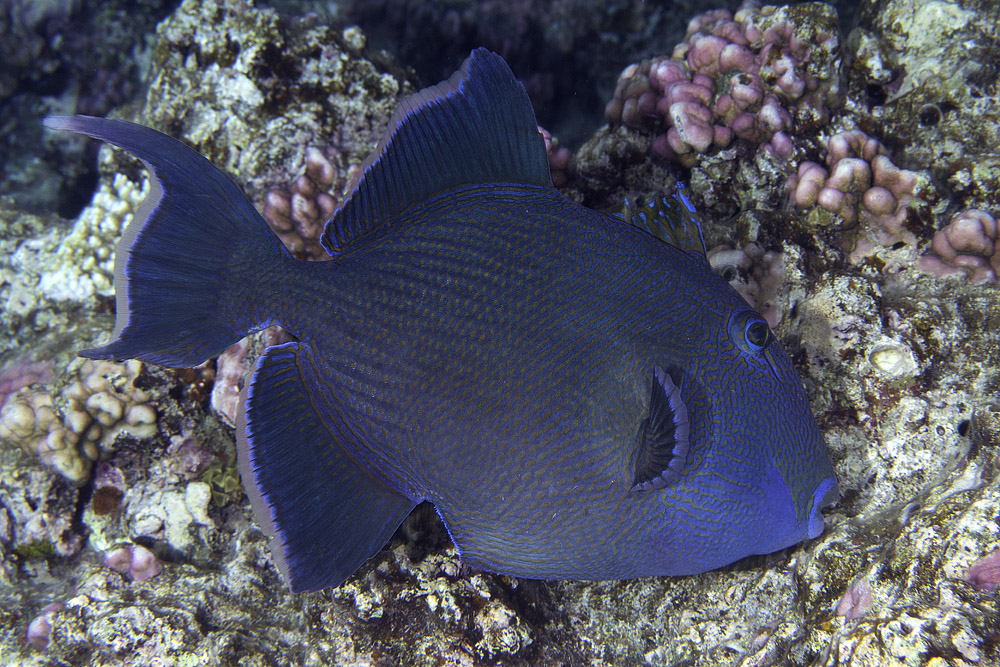
In the Red Sea

In the Red Sea
