= Mystus albolineatus =

Conservation status
- Least Concern (IUCN 3.1)

Scientific classification
- Kingdom: Animalia
- Phylum: Chordata
- Class: Actinopterygii
- Division: Teleostei
- Order: Siluriformes
- Family: Bagridae
- Genus: Mystus
- Species: M. albolineatus

Binomial name
- Mystus albolineatus Roberts, 1994

Species of fish

Mystus albolineatus (known locally as trey kanhchos bay) is a species of catfish endemic to Cambodia, Thailand and Vietnam, known from Chao Phraya River, Bang Pakong River, Mekong River and Tonlé Sap. It is found in flowing and standing waters especially near submerged woody vegetation; it feeds on zooplankton, fishes and insect larvae such as chironomidae. It spawns before or during the rainy season and the young were first caught in July and August. It occurs in both the market and aquarium trade and is fished with seines, gillnets and traps. It is not considered threatened thus listed Least Concern, however, further research about this fish is needed.
