= Xanthichthys caeruleolineatus =

Scientific classification
- Kingdom: Animalia
- Phylum: Chordata
- Class: Actinopterygii
- Order: Tetraodontiformes
- Family: Balistidae
- Genus: Xanthichthys
- Species: X. caeruleolineatus

Binomial name
- Xanthichthys caeruleolineatus J. E. Randall, Matsuura & Zama, 1978

Synonyms
- Xenobalistes punctatus Heemstra & M. P. Smith, 1983

Species of fish

Xanthichthys caeruleolineatus, the outrigger triggerfish is a species of triggerfish from the Indo-West Pacific. It occasionally makes its way into the aquarium trade. It grows to a size of 35 cm (14 in) in length.
