= Hypoxia in fish =

Response of fish to environmental hypoxia

Fish are exposed to large oxygen fluctuations in their aquatic environment since the inherent properties of water can result in marked spatial and temporal differences in the concentration of oxygen (see oxygenation and underwater). Fish respond to hypoxia with varied behavioral, physiological, and cellular responses to maintain homeostasis and organism function in an oxygen-depleted environment. The biggest challenge fish face when exposed to low oxygen conditions is maintaining metabolic energy balance, as 95% of the oxygen consumed by fish is used for ATP production releasing the chemical energy of nutrients through the mitochondrial electron transport chain. Therefore, hypoxia survival requires a coordinated response to secure more oxygen from the depleted environment and counteract the metabolic consequences of decreased ATP production at the mitochondria.

== Hypoxia tolerance ==
A fish's hypoxia tolerance can be represented in different ways. A commonly used representation is the critical O_{2} tension (P_{crit}), which is the lowest water O_{2} tension (P_{O_{2}}) at which a fish can maintain a stable O_{2} consumption rate (M_{O_{2}}). A fish with a lower P_{crit} is therefore thought to be more hypoxia-tolerant than a fish with a higher P_{crit}. But while P_{crit} is often used to represent hypoxia tolerance, it more accurately represents the ability to take up environmental O_{2} at hypoxic P_{O_{2}}s and does not incorporate the significant contributions of anaerobic glycolysis and metabolic suppression to hypoxia tolerance (see below). P_{crit} is nevertheless closely tied to a fish's hypoxia tolerance, in part because some fish prioritize their use of aerobic metabolism over anaerobic metabolism and metabolic suppression. It therefore remains a widely used hypoxia tolerance metric.

A fish's hypoxia tolerance can also be represented as the amount of time it can spend at a particular hypoxic P_{O_{2}} before it loses dorsal-ventral equilibrium (called time-to-LOE), or the P_{O_{2}} at which it loses equilibrium when P_{O_{2}} is decreased from normoxia to anoxia at some set rate (called P_{O_{2}}-of-LOE). A higher time-to-LOE value or a lower P_{O_{2}}-of-LOE value therefore imply enhanced hypoxia tolerances. In either case, LOE is a more holistic representation of overall hypoxia tolerance because it incorporates all contributors to hypoxia tolerance, including aerobic metabolism, anaerobic metabolism and metabolic suppression.

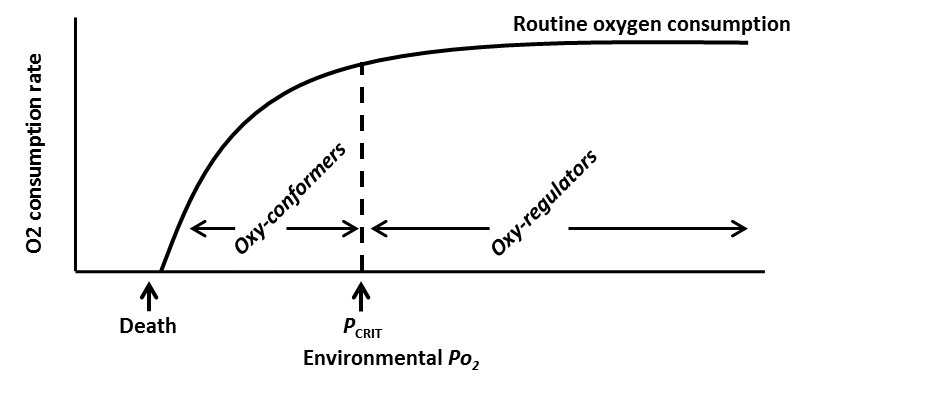
Oxygen consumption rate decreases with decreasing environmental oxygen tension (P_{O_{2}}) when P_{O_{2}}< P_{crit}. On the other hand, oxygen consumption rate is unaffected by the changes in oxygen tension when P_{O_{2}} > P_{crit}

== Oxygen sensing ==
=== Oxygen sensing structures ===
In mammals there are several structures that have been implicated as oxygen sensing structures; however, all of these structures are situated to detect aortic or internal hypoxia since mammals rarely run into environmental hypoxia. These structures include the type I cells of the carotid body, the neuroepithelial bodies of the lungs as well as some central and peripheral neurons and vascular smooth muscle cells. In fish, the neuroepithelial cells (NEC) have been implicated as the major oxygen sensing cells. NEC have been found in all teleost fish studied to date, and are likely a highly conserved structure within many taxa of fish. NEC are also found in all four gill arches within several different structures, such as along the filaments, at the ends of the gill rakers and throughout the lamellae. Two separate neural pathways have been identified within the zebrafish gill arches both the motor and sensory nerve fibre pathways. Since neuroepithelial cells are distributed throughout the gills, they are often ideally situated to detect both arterial as well as environmental oxygen.

=== Mechanisms of neurotransmitter release in neuroepithelial cells ===
Neuroepithelial cells (NEC) are thought to be neuron-like chemoreceptor cells because they rely on membrane potential changes for the release of neurotransmitters and signal transmission onto nearby cells. Once NEC of the zebrafish gills come in contact with either environmental or aortic hypoxia, an outward K^{+} "leak" channel is inhibited. It remains unclear how these K^{+} channels are inhibited by a shortage of oxygen because there are yet to be any known direct binding sites for "a lack of oxygen", only whole cell and ion channel responses to hypoxia. K^{+} "leak" channels are two-pore-domain ion channels that are open at the resting membrane potential of the cell and play a major role in setting the equilibrium resting membrane potential of the cell. Once this "leak" channel is closed, the K^{+} is no longer able to freely flow out of the cell, and the membrane potential of the NEC increases; the cell becomes depolarized. This depolarization causes voltage-gated Ca^{2+} channels to open, and for extracellular Ca^{2+} to flow down its concentration gradient into the cell causing the intracellular Ca^{2+} concentration to greatly increase. Once the Ca^{2+} is inside the cell, it binds to the vesicle release machinery and facilitates binding of the t-snare complex on the vesicle to the s-snare complex on the NEC cell membrane which initiates the release of neurotransmitters into the synaptic cleft.

=== Signal transduction up to higher brain centres ===
If the post-synaptic cell is a sensory neuron, then an increased firing rate in that neuron will transmit the signal to the central nervous system for integration. Whereas, if the post-synaptic cell is a connective pillar cell or a vascular smooth muscle cell, then the serotonin will cause vasoconstriction and previously unused lamellae will be recruited through recruitment of more capillary beds, and the total surface area for gas exchange per lamella will be increased.

In fish, the hypoxic signal is carried up to the brain for processing by the glossopharyngeal (cranial nerve IX) and vagus (cranial nerve X) nerves. The first branchial arch is innervated by the glossopharyngeal nerve (cranial nerve IX); however all four arches are innervated by the vagus nerve (cranial nerve X). Both the glossopharyngeal and vagus nerves carry sensory nerve fibres into the brain and central nervous system.

=== Locations of oxygen sensors ===
Through studies using mammalian model organisms, there are two main hypotheses for the location of oxygen sensing in chemoreceptor cells: the membrane hypothesis and the mitochondrial hypothesis. The membrane hypothesis was proposed for the carotid body in mice, and it predicts that oxygen sensing is an ion balance initiated process. The mitochondrial hypothesis was also proposed for the carotid body of mice, but it relies on the levels of oxidative phosphorylation and/or reactive oxygen species (ROS) production as a cue for hypoxia. Specifically, the oxygen sensitive K^{+} currents are inhibited by H_{2}O_{2} and NADPH oxidase activation. There is evidence for both of these hypotheses depending on the species used for the study. For the neuroepithelial cells in the zebrafish gills, there is strong evidence supporting the "membrane hypothesis" due to their capacity to respond to hypoxia after removal of the contents of the cell. However, there is no evidence against multiple sites for oxygen sensing in organisms.

== Acute responses to hypoxia ==
Many hypoxic environments never reach the level of anoxia and most fish are able to cope with this stress using different physiological and behavioural strategies. Fish that use air breathing organs (ABO) tend to live in environments with highly variable oxygen content and rely on aerial respiration during times when there is not enough oxygen to support water-breathing. Though all teleosts have some form of swim bladder, many of them are not capable of breathing air, and they rely on aquatic surface respiration as a supply of more oxygenated water at the surface of the water. However, many species of teleost fish are obligate water breathers and do not display either of these surface respiratory behaviours.

Typically, acute hypoxia causes hyperventilation, bradycardia and an elevation in gill vascular resistance in teleosts. However, the benefit of these changes in blood pressure to oxygen uptake has not been supported in a recent study of the rainbow trout. It is possible that the acute hypoxia response is simply a stress response, and the advantages found in early studies may only result after acclimatization to the environment.

== Behavioral responses ==
Hypoxia can modify normal behavior. Parental behaviour meant to provide oxygen to the eggs is often affected by hypoxia. For example, fanning behavior (swimming on the spot near the eggs to create a flow of water over them, and thus a constant supply of oxygen) is often increased when oxygen is less available. This has been documented in sticklebacks, gobies, and clownfishes, among others. Gobies may also increase the size of the openings in the nest they build, even though this may increase the risk of predation on the eggs. Rainbow cichlids often move their young fry closer to the water surface, where oxygen is more available, during hypoxic episodes.

Behavioural adaptations meant to survive when oxygen is scarce include reduced activity levels, aquatic surface respiration, and air breathing.

=== Reduced activity levels ===
As oxygen levels decrease, fish may at first increase movements in an attempt to escape the hypoxic zone, but eventually they greatly reduce their activity levels, thus reducing their energetic (and therefore oxygen) demands. Atlantic herring show this exact pattern. Other examples of fishes that reduce their activity levels under hypoxia include the common sole, the guppy, the small-spotted catshark, and the viviparous eelpout. Some sharks that ram-ventilate their gills may understandably increase their swimming speeds under hypoxia, to bring more water to the gills.

=== Aquatic surface respiration ===
In response to decreasing dissolved oxygen level in the environment, fish swim up to the surface of the water column and ventilate at the top layer of the water where it contains relatively higher level of dissolved oxygen, a behavior called aquatic surface respiration (ASR). Oxygen diffuses into water from air and therefore the top layer of water in contact with air contains more oxygen. This is true only in stagnant water; in running water all layers are mixed together and oxygen levels are the same throughout the water column. One environment where ASR often takes place is tidepools, particularly at night. Separation from the sea at low tide means that water is not renewed, fish crowding within the pool means that oxygen is quickly depleted, and absence of light at night means that there is no photosynthesis to replenish the oxygen. Examples of tidepool species that perform ASR include the tidepool sculpin, the three-spined stickleback, and the mummichog.

But ASR is not limited to the intertidal environment. Most tropical and temperate fish species living in stagnant waters engage in ASR during hypoxia. One study looked at 26 species representing eight families of non-air breathing fishes from the North American great plains, and found that all but four of them performed ASR during hypoxia. Another study looked at 24 species of tropical fish common to the pet trade, from tetras to barbs to cichlids, and found that all of them performed ASR. An unusual situation in which ASR is performed is during winter, in lakes covered by ice, at the interface between water and ice or near air bubbles trapped underneath the ice.

Some species may show morphological adaptations, such as a flat head and an upturned mouth, that allow them to perform ASR without breaking the water surface (which would make them more visible to aerial predators). One example is the mummichog, whose upturned mouth suggests surface feeding, but whose feeding habits are not particularly restricted to the surface. In the tambaqui, a South American species, exposure to hypoxia induces within hours the development of additional blood vessels inside the lower lip, enhancing its ability to take up oxygen during ASR. Swimming upside down may also help fishes perform ASR, as in some upside-down catfish.

Some species may hold an air bubble within the mouth during ASR. This may assist buoyancy as well as increase the oxygen content of the water passing over the bubble on its way to the gills. Another way to reduce buoyancy costs is to perform ASR on rocks or plants that provide support near the water surface.

ASR significantly affects survival of fish during severe hypoxia. In the shortfin molly for example, survival was approximately four times higher in individuals able to perform ASR as compared to fish not allowed to perform ASR during their exposure to extreme hypoxia.

ASR may be performed more often when the need for oxygen is higher. In the sailfin molly, gestating females (this species is a livebearer) spend about 50% of their time in ASR as compared to only 15% in non-gestating females under the same low levels of oxygen.

=== Aerial respiration (air breathing) ===
Aerial respiration is the 'gulping' of air at the surface of water to directly extract oxygen from the atmosphere. Aerial respiration evolved in fish that were exposed to more frequent hypoxia; also, species that engage in aerial respiration tend to be more hypoxia tolerant than those which do not air-breath during the hypoxia.

There are two main types of air breathing fish—facultative and non-facultative. Under normoxic conditions facultative fish can survive without having to breathe air from the surface of the water. However, non-facultative fish must respire at the surface even in normal dissolved oxygen levels because their gills cannot extract enough oxygen from the water.

Many air breathing freshwater teleosts use ABOs to effectively extract oxygen from air while maintaining functions of the gills. ABOs are modified gastrointestinal tracts, gas bladders, and labyrinth organs; they are highly vascularized and provide additional method of extracting oxygen from the air. Fish also use ABO for storing the retained oxygen.

==== Predation risk associated with ASR and aerial respiration ====
Both ASR and aerial respiration require fish to travel to the top of water column and this behaviour increases the predation risks by aerial predators or other piscivores inhabiting near the surface of the water. To cope with the increased predation risk upon surfacing, some fish perform ASR or aerial respiration in schools to 'dilute' the predation risk. When fish can visually detect the presence of their aerial predators, they simply refrain from surfacing, or prefer to surface in areas where they can be detected less easily (i.e. turbid, shaded areas).

== Gill remodelling in hypoxia ==
Gill remodelling happens in only a few species of fish, and it involves the buildup or removal of an inter-lamellar cell mass (ILCM). As a response to hypoxia, some fish are able to remodel their gills to increase respiratory surface area, with some species such as goldfish doubling their lamellar surface areas in as little as 8 hours. The increased respiratory surface area comes as a trade-off with increased metabolic costs because the gills are a very important site for many important processes including respiratory gas exchange, acid-base regulation, nitrogen excretion, osmoregulation, hormone regulation, metabolism, and environmental sensing.

The crucian carp is one species able to remodel its gill filaments in response to hypoxia. Their inter-lamellar cells have high rates of mitotic activity which are influenced by both hypoxia and temperature. In cold (15 °C) water the crucian carp has more ILCM, but when the temperature is increased to 25 °C the ILCM is removed, just as it would be in hypoxic conditions. This same transition in gill morphology occurs in the goldfish when the temperature was raised from 7.5 °C to 15 °C. This difference may be due to the temperature regimes that these fish are typically found in, or there could be an underlying protective mechanism to prevent a loss of ion balance in stressful temperatures. Temperature also affects the speed at which the gills can be remodelled: for example, at 20 °C in hypoxia, the crucian carp can completely remove its ILCM in 6 hours, whereas at 8 °C, the same process takes 3–7 days. The ILCM is likely removed by apoptosis, but it is possible that when the fish is faced with the double stress of hypoxia at high temperature, the lamellae may be lost by physical degradation. Covering the gill lamellae may protect species like the crucian carp from parasites and environmental toxins during normoxia by limiting their surface area for inward diffusion while still maintaining oxygen transport due to an extremely high hemoglobin oxygen binding affinity.

The naked carp, a closely related species native to the high-altitude Lake Qinghai, is also able to remodel their gills in response to hypoxic conditions. In response to oxygen levels 95% lower than normoxic conditions, apoptosis of ILCM increases lamellar surface area by up to 60% after just 24 hours. However, this comes at a significant osmoregulatory cost, reducing sodium and chloride levels in the cytoplasm by over 10%. The morphological response to hypoxia by scaleless carp is the fastest respiratory surface remodelling reported in vertebrates thus far.

== Oxygen uptake ==
Fish exhibit a wide range of tactics to counteract aquatic hypoxia, but when escape from the hypoxic stress is not possible, maintaining oxygen extraction and delivery becomes an essential component to survival. Except for the Antarctic ice fish that does not, most fish use hemoglobin (Hb) within their red blood cells to bind chemically and deliver 95% of the oxygen extracted from the environment to the working tissues. Maintaining oxygen extraction and delivery to the tissues allows continued activity under hypoxic stress and is in part determined by modifications in two different blood parameters: hematocrit and the binding properties of hemoglobin.

=== Hematocrit ===
In general, hematocrit is the number of red blood cells (RBC) in circulation and is highly variable among fish species. Active fish, like the blue marlin, tend to have higher hematocrits, whereas less active fish, such as the starry flounder exhibit lower hematocrits. Hematocrit may be increased in response to both short-term (acute) or long-term (chronic) hypoxia exposure and results in an increase in the total amount of oxygen the blood can carry, also known as the oxygen carrying capacity of the blood. Acute changes in hematocrit are the result of circulating stress hormones (see - catecholamines) activating receptors on the spleen that cause the release of RBCs into circulation. During chronic hypoxia exposure, the mechanism used to increase hematocrit is independent of the spleen and results from hormonal stimulation of the kidney by erythropoetin (EPO). Increasing hematocrit in response to erythropoietin is observed after approximately one week and is therefore likely under genetic control of hypoxia inducible factor hypoxia inducible factor (HIF). While increasing hematocrit means that the blood can carry a larger total amount of oxygen, a possible advantage during hypoxia, increasing the number of RBCs in the blood can also lead to certain disadvantages. First, A higher hematocrit results in more viscous blood (especially in cold water) increasing the amount of energy the cardiac system requires to pump the blood through the system and secondly depending on the transit time of the blood across the branchial arch and the diffusion rate of oxygen, an increased hematocrit may result in less efficient transfer of oxygen from the environment to the blood.

=== Changing the binding affinity of hemoglobin ===
An alternative mechanism to preserve O_{2} delivery in the face of low ambient oxygen is to increase the affinity of the blood. The oxygen content of the blood is related to PaO_{2} and is illustrated using an oxygen equilibrium curve (OEC). Fish hemoglobins, with the exception of the agnathans, are tetramers that exhibit cooperativity of O_{2} binding and have sigmoidal OECs.

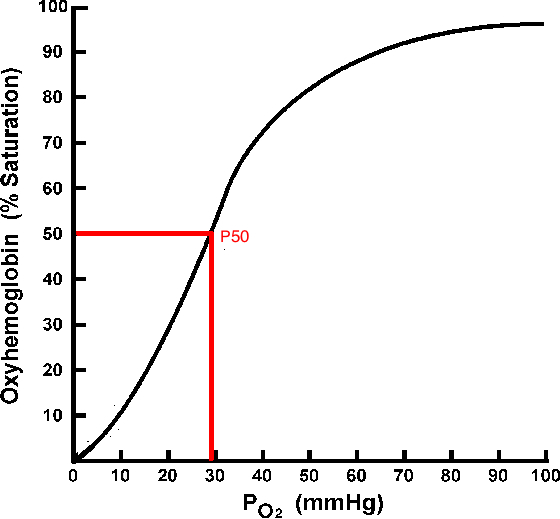
Oxygen equilibrium curve (OEC) demonstrating the PO_{2} required for half of the hemoglobin oxygen binding sites to be saturated with oxygen (P50)

The binding affinity of hemoglobin to oxygen is estimated using a measurement called P50 (the partial pressure of oxygen at which hemoglobin is 50% bound with oxygen) and can be extremely variable. If the hemoglobin has a weak affinity for oxygen, it is said to have a high P50 and therefore constrains the environment in which a fish can inhabit to those with relatively high environmental PO_{2}. Conversely, fish hemoglobins with a low P50 bind strongly to oxygen and are then of obvious advantage when attempting to extract oxygen from hypoxic or variable PO_{2} environments. The use of high affinity (low P50) hemoglobins results in reduced ventillatory and therefore energetic requirements when facing hypoxic insult. The oxygen binding affinity of hemoglobin (Hb-O_{2}) is regulated through a suite of allosteric modulators; the principal modulators used for controlling Hb-O_{2} affinity under hypoxic insult are:

1. Increasing RBC pH
2. Reducing inorganic phosphate interactions

==== pH and inorganic phosphates (Pi) ====
In rainbow trout as well as a variety of other teleosts, increased RBC pH stems from the activation of B-andrenergic Na^{+}/H^{+} exchange protein (BNHE) on the RBC membrane via circulating catelcholamines. This process causes the internal pH of the RBC to increase through the outwards movement of H^{+} and inwards movement of Na^{+}. The net consequence of alkalizing the RBC is an increase in Hb-O_{2} affinity via the Bohr effect. The net influx of Na^{+} ions and the compensatory activation of Na^{+}/K^{+}-ATPase to maintain ionic equilibrium within the RBC results in a steady decline in cellular ATP, also serving to increase Hb-O_{2} affinity. As a further result of inward Na^{+} movement, the osmolarity of the RBC increases causing osmotic influx of water and cell swelling. The dilution of the cell contents causes further spatial separation of hemoglobin from the inorganic phosphates and again serves to increase Hb-O_{2} affinity. Intertidal hypoxia-tolerant triplefin fish (Family Tripterygiidae) species seem to take advantage of intracellular acidosis and appears to "bypasse" the traditional oxidative phosphorylation and directly drives mitochondrial ATP synthesis using the cytosolic pool of protons that likely accumulates in hypoxia (via lactic acidosis and ATP hydrolysis).

==== Changing Hb- isoforms ====
Nearly all animals have more than one kind of Hb present in the RBC. Multiple Hb isoforms (see isoforms) are particularly common in ectotherms, but especially in fish that are required to cope with both fluctuating temperature and oxygen availability. Hbs isolated from the European eel can be separated into anodic and cathodic isoforms. The anodic isoforms have low oxygen affinities (high P50) and marked Bohr effects, while the cathodic lack significant pH effects and are therefore thought to confer hypoxia tolerance. Several species of African cichlids raised from early stage development under either hypoxic or normoxic conditions were contrasted in an attempt to compare Hb isoforms. They demonstrated there were Hb isoforms specific to the hypoxia-raised individuals.

== Metabolic challenge ==
To deal with decreased ATP production through the electron transport chain, fish must activate anaerobic means of energy production (see anaerobic metabolism) while suppressing metabolic demands. The ability to decrease energy demand by metabolic suppression is essential to ensure hypoxic survival due to the limited efficiency of anaerobic ATP production.

=== Switch from aerobic to anaerobic metabolism ===
Aerobic respiration, in which oxygen is used as the terminal electron acceptor, is crucial to all water-breathing fish. When fish are deprived of oxygen, they require other ways to produce ATP. Thus, a switch from aerobic metabolism to anaerobic metabolism occurs at the onset of hypoxia. Glycolysis and substrate-level phosphorylation are used as alternative pathways for ATP production. However, these pathways are much less efficient than aerobic metabolism. For example, when using the same substrate, the total yield of ATP in anaerobic metabolism is 15 times lower than in aerobic metabolism. This level of ATP production is not sufficient to maintain a high metabolic rate, therefore, the only survival strategy for fish is to alter their metabolic demands.

=== Metabolic suppression ===
Metabolic suppression is the regulated and reversible reduction of metabolic rate below basal metabolic rate (called standard metabolic rate in ectothermic animals). This reduces the fish's rate of ATP use, which prolongs its survival time at severely hypoxic sub-P_{crit} P_{O_{2}}s by reducing the rate at which the fish's finite anaerobic fuel stores (glycogen) are used. Metabolic suppression also reduces the accumulation rate of deleterious anaerobic end-products (lactate and protons), which delays their negative impact on the fish.

The mechanisms that fish use to suppress metabolic rate occur at behavioral, physiological and biochemical levels. Behaviorally, metabolic rate can be lowered through reduced locomotion, feeding, courtship, and mating. Physiologically, metabolic rate can be lowered through reduced growth, digestion, gonad development, and ventilation efforts. And biochemically, metabolic rate can be further lowered below standard metabolic rate through reduced gluconeogenesis, protein synthesis and degradation rates, and ion pumping across cellular membranes. Reductions in these processes lower ATP use rates, but it remains unclear whether metabolic suppression is induced through an initial reduction in ATP use or ATP supply.

The prevalence of metabolic suppression use among fish species has not been thoroughly explored. This is partly because the metabolic rates of hypoxia-exposed fish, including suppressed metabolic rates, can only be accurately measured using direct calorimetry, and this technique is seldom used for fish. The few studies that have used calorimetry reveal that some fish species employ metabolic suppression in hypoxia/anoxia (e.g., goldfish, tilapia, European eel) while others do not (e.g. rainbow trout, zebrafish). The species that employ metabolic suppression are more hypoxia-tolerant than the species that do not, which suggests that metabolic suppression enhances hypoxia tolerance. Consistent with this, differences in hypoxia tolerance among isolated threespine stickleback populations appear to result from differences in the use of metabolic suppression, with the more tolerant stickleback using metabolic suppression.

Fish that are capable of hypoxia-induced metabolic suppression reduce their metabolic rates by 30% to 80% relative to standard metabolic rates. Because this is not a complete cessation of metabolic rate, metabolic suppression can only prolong hypoxic survival, not sustain it indefinitely. If the hypoxic exposure lasts sufficiently long, the fish will succumb to a depletion of its glycogen stores and/or the over-accumulation of deleterious anaerobic end-products. Furthermore, the severely limited energetic scope that comes with a metabolically suppressed state means that the fish is unable to complete critical tasks such a predator avoidance and reproduction. Perhaps for these reasons, goldfish prioritize their use of aerobic metabolism in most hypoxic environments, reserving metabolic suppression for the extreme case of anoxia.

=== Energy conservation ===
In addition to a reduction in the rate of protein synthesis, it appears that some species of hypoxia-tolerant fish conserve energy by employing Hochachka's ion channel arrest hypothesis. This hypothesis makes two predictions:

1. Hypoxia-tolerant animals naturally have low membrane permeabilities
2. Membrane permeability decreases even more during hypoxic conditions (ion channel arrest)

The first prediction holds true. When membrane permeability to Na+ and K+ ions was compared between reptiles and mammals, reptile membranes were discovered to be five times less leaky. The second prediction has been more difficult to prove experimentally; however, indirect measures have shown a decrease in Na+/K+-ATPase activity in eel and trout hepatocytes during hypoxic conditions. Results seem to be tissue-specific, as crucian carp exposed to hypoxia do not undergo a reduction in Na+/K+ ATPase activity in their brain. Although evidence is limited, ion channel arrest enables organisms to maintain ion channel concentration gradients and membrane potentials without consuming large amounts of ATP.

=== Enhanced glycogen stores ===
The limiting factor for fish undergoing hypoxia is the availability of fermentable substrate for anaerobic metabolism; once substrate runs out, ATP production ceases. Endogenous glycogen is present in tissue as a long term energy storage molecule. It can be converted into glucose and subsequently used as the starting material in glycolysis. A key adaptation to long-term survival during hypoxia is the ability of an organism to store large amounts of glycogen. Many hypoxia-tolerant species, such as carp, goldfish, killifish, and oscar contain the largest glycogen content (300-2000 μmol glocosyl units/g) in their tissue compared to hypoxia-sensitive fish, such as rainbow trout, which contain only 100 μmol glocosyl units/g. The more glycogen stored in a tissue indicates the capacity for that tissue to undergo glycolysis and produce ATP.

=== Tolerance of waste products ===
When anaerobic pathways are turned on, glycogen stores are depleted and accumulation of acidic waste products occurs. This is known as a Pasteur effect. A challenge hypoxia-tolerant fish face is how to produce ATP anaerobically without creating a significant Pasteur effect. Along with a reduction in metabolism, some fish have adapted traits to avoid accumulation of lactate. For example, the crucian carp, a highly hypoxia-tolerant fish, has evolved to survive months of anoxic waters. A key adaptation is the ability to convert lactate to ethanol in the muscle and excrete it out of their gills. Although this process is energetically costly it is crucial to their survival in hypoxic waters.

== Gene expression changes ==
DNA microarray studies done on different fish species exposed to low-oxygen conditions have shown that at the genetic level fish respond to hypoxia by changing the expression of genes involved in oxygen transport, ATP production, and protein synthesis. In the liver of mudsuckers exposed to hypoxia there were changes in the expression of genes involved in heme metabolism such as hemopexin, heme oxygenase 1, and ferritin. Changes in the sequestration and metabolism of iron may suggest hypoxia induced erythropoiesis and increased demand for hemoglobin synthesis, leading to increased oxygen uptake and transport. Increased expression of myoglobin, which is normally only found in muscle tissue, has also been observed after hypoxia exposure in the gills of zebrafish and in non-muscle tissue of the common carp suggesting increased oxygen transport throughout fish tissues.

Microarray studies done on fish species exposed to hypoxia typically show a metabolic switch, that is, a decrease in the expression of genes involved in aerobic metabolism and an increase in expression of genes involved in anaerobic metabolism. Zebrafish embryos exposed to hypoxia decreased expression of genes involved in the citric acid cycle including, succinate dehydrogenase, malate dehydrogenase, and citrate synthase, and increased expression of genes involved in glycolysis such as phosphoglycerate mutase, enolase, aldolase, and lactate dehydrogenase. A decrease in protein synthesis is an important response to hypoxia to decrease ATP demand for whole organism metabolic suppression. Decreases in the expression of genes involved in protein synthesis, such as elongation factor-2 and several ribosomal proteins, have been shown in the muscle of the mudsucker and gills of adult zebrafish after hypoxia exposure .

Research in mammals has implicated hypoxia inducible factor (HIF) as a key regulator of gene expression changes in response to hypoxia However, a direct link between fish HIFs and gene expression changes in response to hypoxia has yet to be found. Phylogenetic analysis of available fish, tetrapod, and bird HIF-α and -β sequences shows that the isoforms of both subunits present in mammals are also represented in fish Within fish, HIF sequences group close together and are distinct from tetrapod and bird sequences. As well, amino acid analysis of available fish HIF-α and -β sequences reveals that they contain all functional domains shown to be important for mammalian HIF function, including the basic helix-loop-helix (bHLH) domain, Per-ARNT-Sim (PAS) domain, and the oxygen-dependent degradation domain (ODD), which render the HIF-α subunit sensitive to oxygen levels. The evolutionary similarity between HIF sequences in fish, tetrapods and birds, as well as the conservation of important functional domains suggests that HIF function and regulation is similar between fish and mammalian species. There is also evidence of novel HIF mechanisms present in fish not found in mammals. In mammals, HIF-α protein is continuously synthesized and regulated post-translationally by changing oxygen conditions, but it has been shown in different fish species that HIF-α mRNA levels are also responsive to hypoxia. In the hypoxia tolerant grass carp, substantial increases in HIF-1α and HIF-3α mRNA were observed in all tissues after hypoxia exposure. Likewise, mRNA levels of HIF-1α and HIF-2α were hypoxia-responsive in the ovaries of the Atlantic croaker during both short and long term hypoxia.

== See also ==
- Algal bloom
- Eutrophication
- Fish kill
- Hypoxia (environmental)
