= Taojin =

Taojin may refer to:

- Taojin station, Yuexiu District, Guangzhou, Guandong, China; on Line 5 of the Guangzhou Metro
- Taojin Village, Longtang, Anhua, Yiyang, Hunan, China
- Taojin Village, Guzhang County, Xiangxi Prefecture, Hunan Province, China; see Waxiang Chinese

== See also ==
- Tao Jin (disambiguation)
- Tao (disambiguation)
- Jin (disambiguation)
- Jintao (disambiguation)
