= Tao Jin =

Tao Jin or variant is the name of:

== Surname "Tao", given name "Jin" ==
- Tao Jin (actor) (1916–1986), Chinese actor
- Tao Jin (footballer) (born 1985), Chinese association footballer

== Given name "Tao", surname "Jin" ==
- Jin Tao (director), a Chinese director; see Golden Eagle Award for Best Television Series Director (China)

== See also ==
- Taojin (disambiguation)
- Tao (disambiguation)
- Jin (disambiguation)
- Jintao (disambiguation)
