= Ko Tao =

Island subdistrict in Surat Thani, Thailand

Ko Tao เกาะเต่า
- Subdistrict
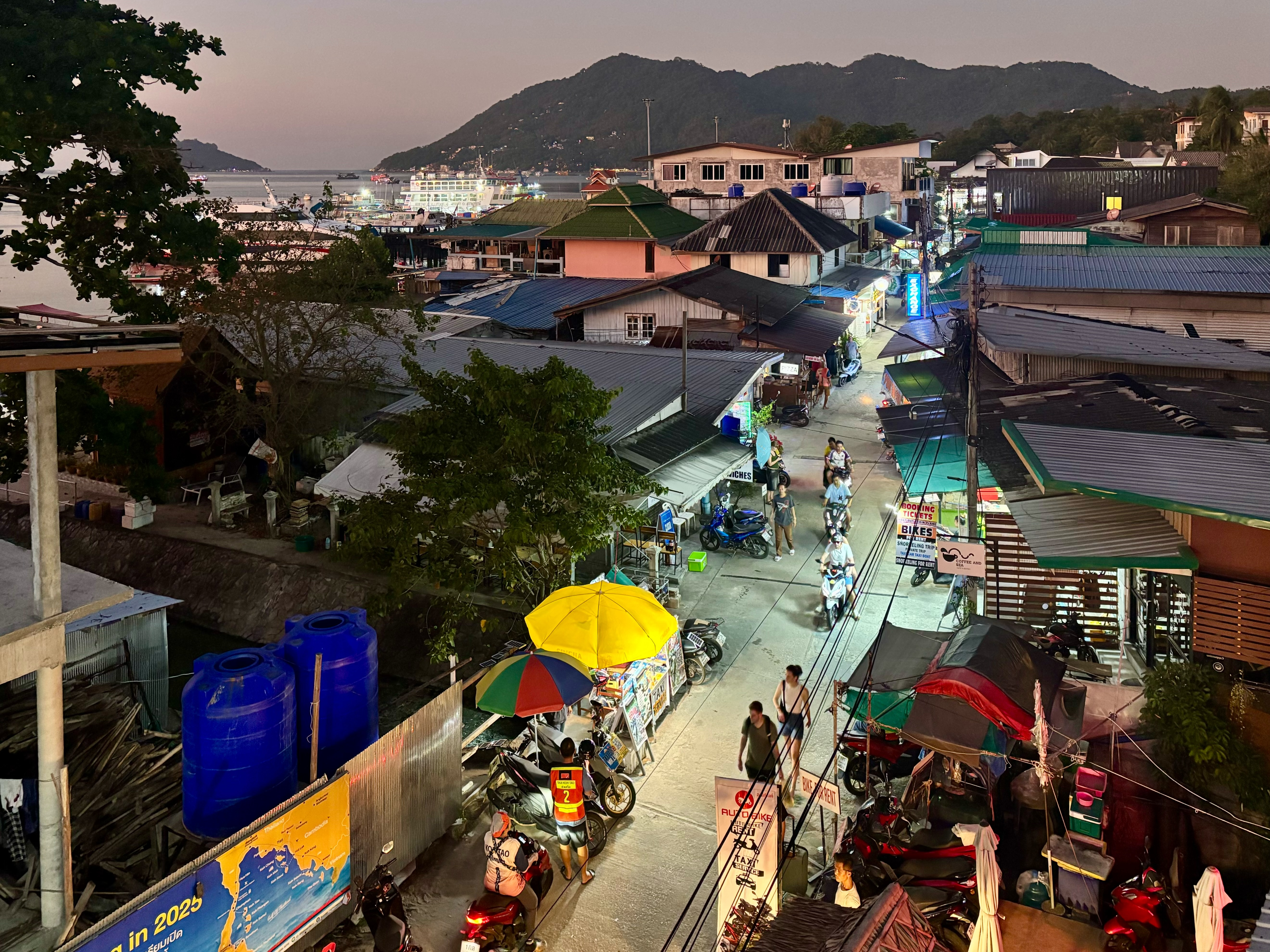
- Ko Tao's port town, Mae Haad during sunset

- Location within Thailand
- Coordinates: 10°5′24″N 99°50′17″E
- Country: Thailand
- Province: Surat Thani
- District: Ko Pha-ngan

Area
  - Total: 21 km^{2} (8.1 sq mi)

Population
  - Total: 1,382
- Time zone: UTC+7 (ICT)

Ko Tao (Thai: เกาะเต่า, pronounced [kɔ̀ʔ tàw], lit. 'Turtle Island') is an island in Thailand and is part of the Chumphon Archipelago on the western shore of the Gulf of Thailand. It covers an area of about 21 km^{2} (8 sq mi). Administratively it is a subdistrict (tambon) of Ko Pha-ngan District (amphoe) of Surat Thani Province. As of 2006, its official population was 1,382. The main settlement is Ban Mae Haad.

The economy of the island is almost exclusively centered on tourism, especially scuba diving. Scuba diving is extremely popular in Ko Tao due to clear visibility, inexpensive pricing, warm water, and the range of sealife to be seen.

== History ==
Before being settled the island would be occasionally visited by fishermen from neighbouring islands looking for shelter in a storm or just resting before continuing on their journeys.

It would appear from old maps and descriptions that this island was known by European cartographers and mariners as "Pulo Bardia", indicating that it was first settled by Malayo-Polynesian peoples. The old maps show a chain of three islands aligned north–south and lying off the east coast of the Malay Peninsula. The most northerly and smallest of these islands is marked P. Bardia, the name it had until the early 1900s. The best map example is by John Thornton from The English Pilot, the Third Book, dated 1701, but the specific map of the Gulf of Siam is dated around 1677. Also see maps of the East Indies by William Dampier c.1697. By modern standards of accuracy, the islands are poorly placed on early maps. Seventeenth century marine navigation and cartography used the "backstaff" which, in this area, was accurate to one degree of longitude, or around 60 nautical miles.

The Edinburgh Gazetteer, or Geographical Dictionary published in 1827 also mentions the island and provides a geographical position. In his 1852 book titled Narrative of a Residence in Siam. by Frederick Arthur Neale, the author describes the people and wildlife of Bardia. According to the account there were farms and even cows in a village on the bay lying on the west side of the island. The book includes a fanciful illustration of "Bardia" showing huts and palm trees.

Joseph Huddart in 1801 included these directions for navigating the islands, "To the N.W. by N are two islands of about the same height as Poolo Carnom [Ko Samui]; the first, called SANCORY [Ko Pha-ngan], is 7 leagues from Carnom; the other..., named BARDA, or Bardia [Ko Tao], is 7½ leagues from Sancory." (A league is approximately 3 nautical miles or 5.5 km.)

On 18 June 1899, King Chulalongkorn visited Ko Tao and left as evidence his monogram on a huge boulder at Jor Por Ror Bay next to Sairee Beach. This place is still worshiped today.

In 1933, the island started to be used as a political prison. In 1947 Khuang Abhaiwongse, prime minister at that time, pleaded and received a royal pardon for all prisoners on the island. Everybody was taken to the shore of Surat Thani and Ko Tao was abandoned again.

In the 1980s, overseas travellers began to visit Ko Tao and it quickly became a popular destination. In the 1990s the island became known as a diving site.

== Environment ==
The island is an important breeding ground for hawksbill and green turtles. The development of tourism has negatively impacted the health of these grounds, but a breeding programme organised in 2004 by the Royal Thai Navy and KT-DOC, a coalition of local scuba diving centres, has reintroduced hundreds of juvenile turtles to the island's ecosystem.

Chumpon Pinnacle, a dive site to the west of the island has a reputation for divers in search of both whale sharks and bull sharks. However, because of warmer water temperatures over the last year a great number of bull sharks have migrated to cooler waters. The island is host to over 130 species of hard corals, and over 223 species of reef fishes belonging to 53 families.

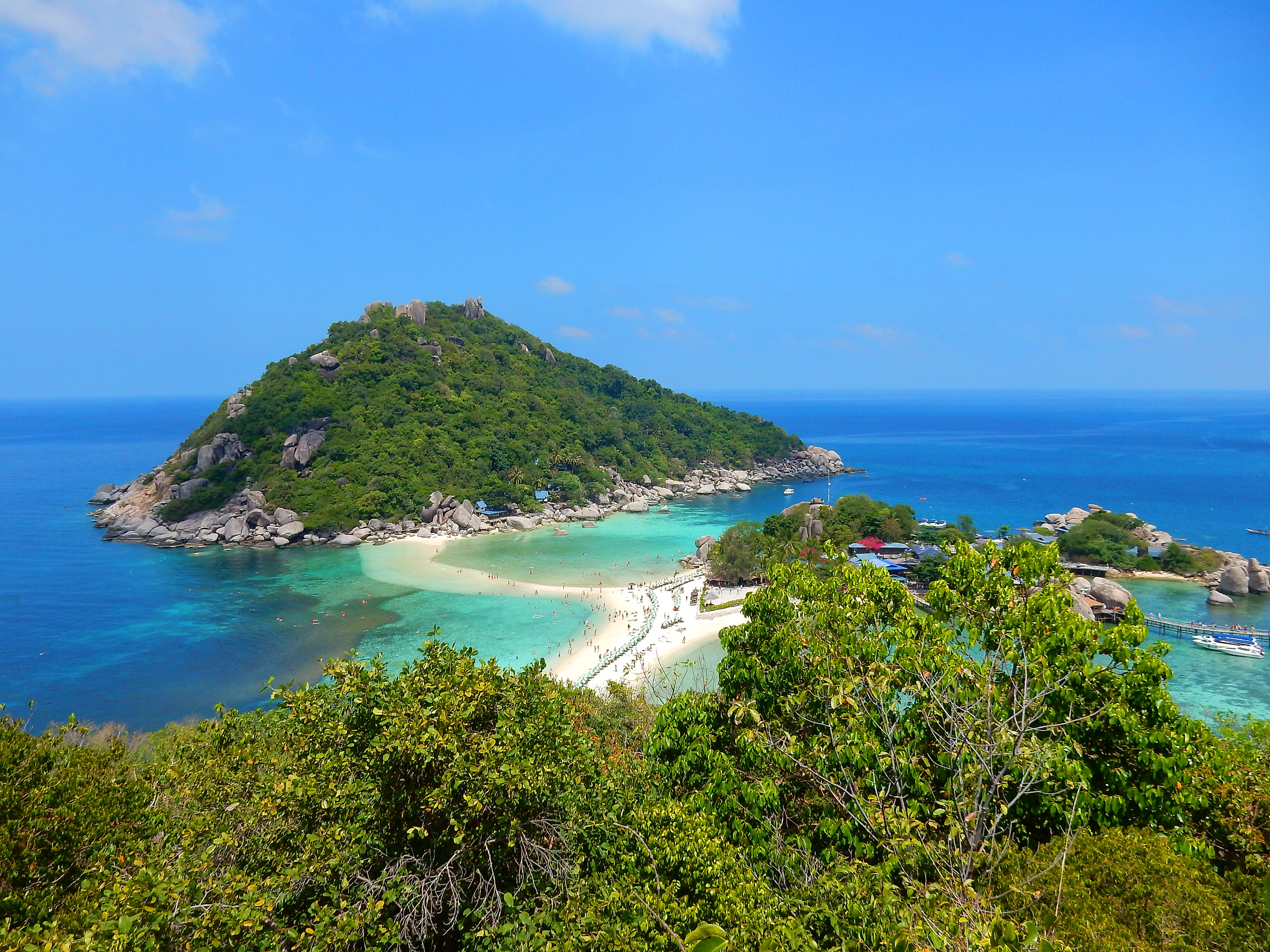
Koh Nang Yuan, three tiny islands that are connected by a sandbar, situated close to Koh Tao in the Gulf of Thailand.

Diving conditions have improved in the past few years with the continuing education of locals by the dive community. El Niño weather patterns caused a warming of the waters which resulted in the loss of the shallow corals near the island. Since then, the recovery has been notable. Ko Tao now offers some of the best scuba diving in the Gulf of Thailand. And with help by the island conservation group, Save Koh Tao, the island's environmental outlook is improving.

As one of the world's most popular diving destinations, more attention is being focused on the negative effects of diving on coral reef health around Ko Tao. Natural factors combined with over-use of some areas has led to an increase in the abundance of corallivores such as Drupella snails and the crown-of-thorns starfish around the island in recent years. In 2012, a Marine Zoning and Regulations Master Plan was developed for the island and subsequently become local law, but the positive effects of increased management have yet to be realized.

Tourism and development on the island has grown steadily for the last several decades, with public infrastructure often lagging far behind. Shortages of electricity and fresh water are common, and both solid and liquid waste management is inadequate. About 42,000 tonnes of solid waste are produced annually on the island, resulting in a 45,000 tonne garbage mountain while the island's waste incinerator sits idle.

== Tourism ==
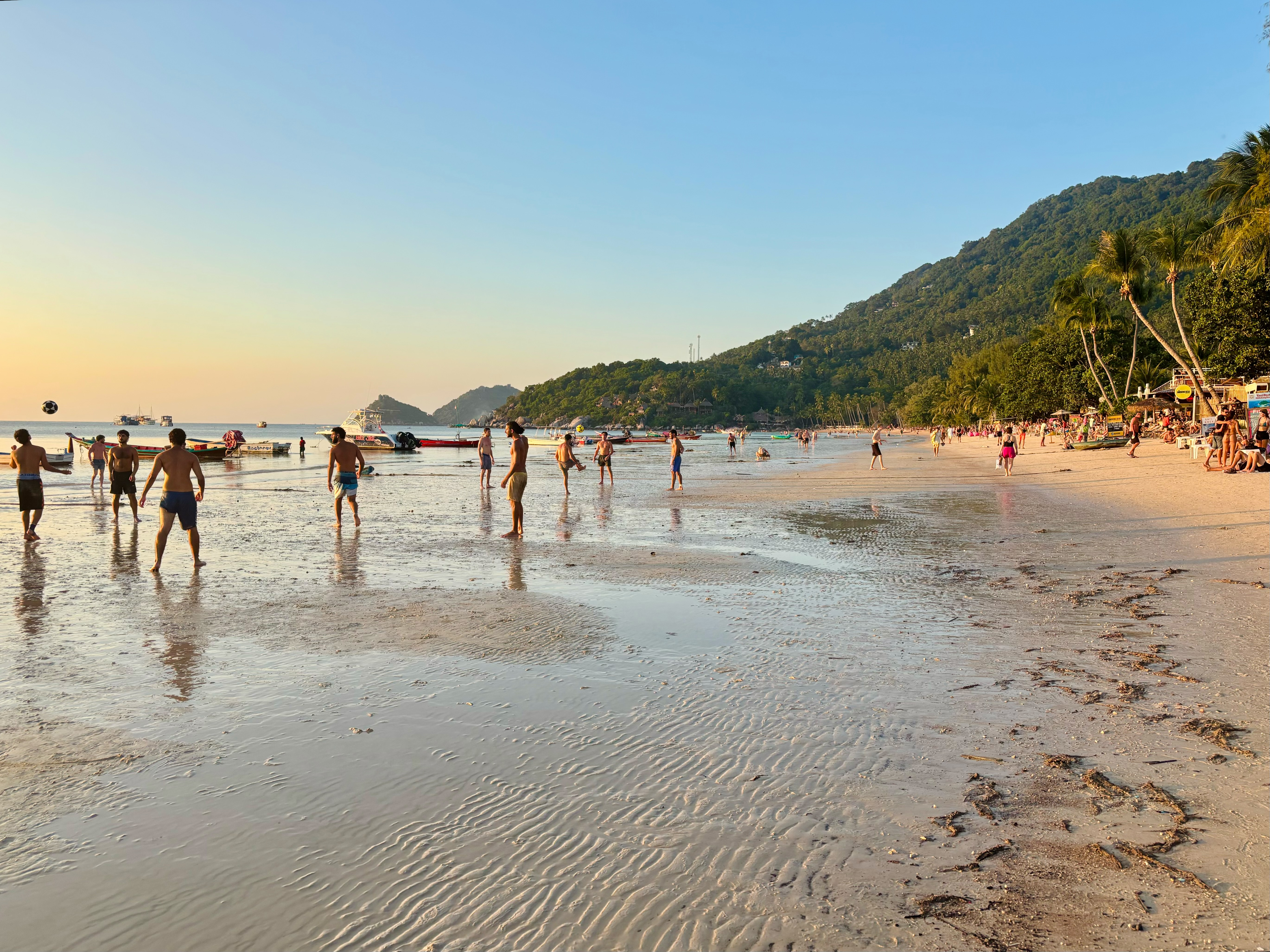
Sairee Beach

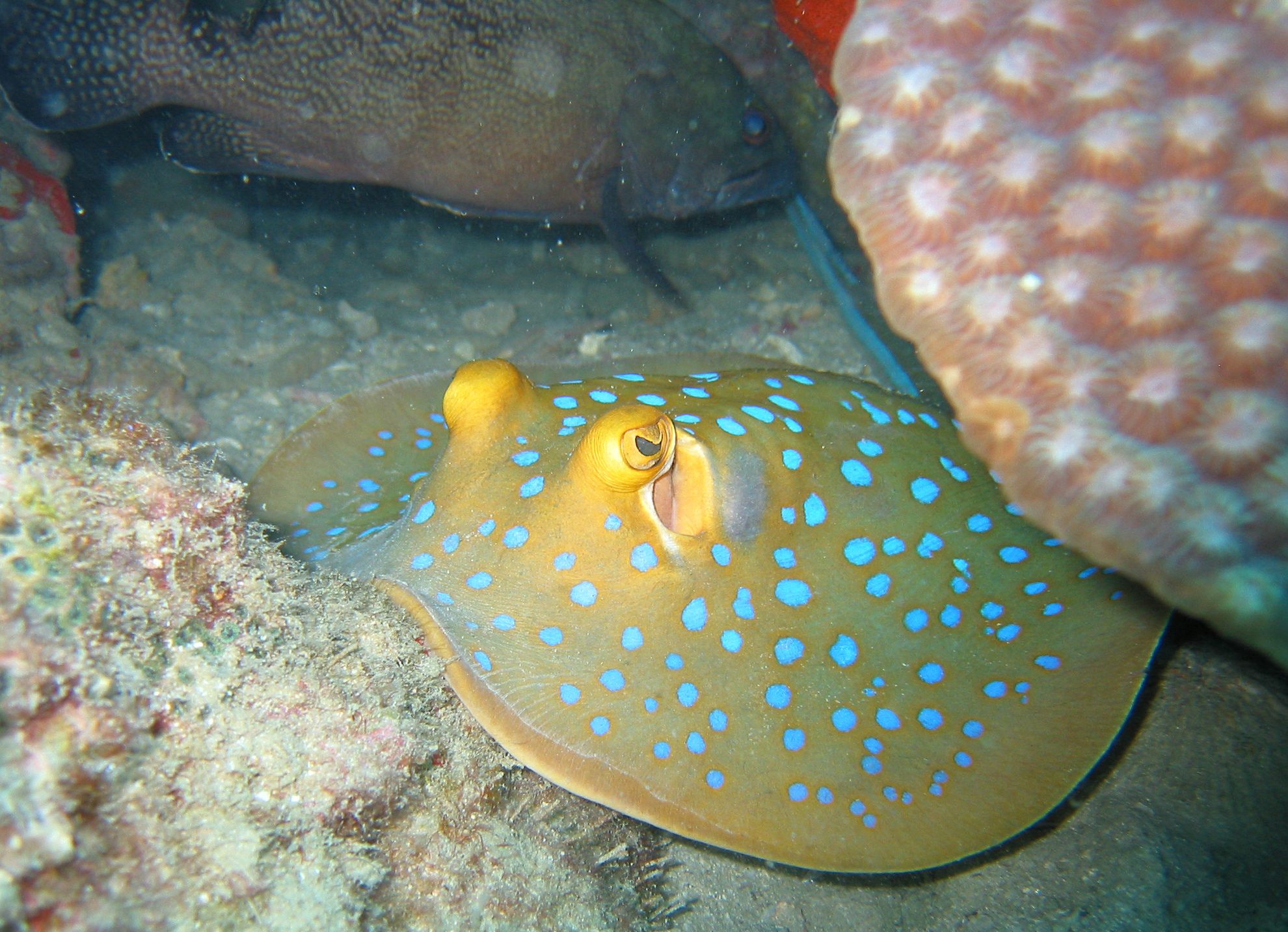
Bluespotted ribbontail ray photographed in the waters around Ko Tao

Ko Tao is one of Thailand's most popular tourist spots. The Bangkok Post has cited its annual visitor count as 132,000 and three million.

The island is well known for scuba diving and snorkeling, as well as hiking, rock climbing, and bouldering. The most popular place for tourists is Sairee on the west coast, which has a white sandy beach of 1.7 km interrupted only by a few huge boulders and a scattering of medium budget resorts and restaurants. Chalok Baan Khao, to the south of the island, is becoming increasingly popular as an alternative for those wishing to escape the crowds. A great many granite boulders, both in the forests and on the beaches of Ko Tao, attract a growing number of climbers. Ko Tao has a little over 25 dive sites to explore.

A series of tourist deaths – including murder and alleged suicide – particularly since 2014, has prompted some to advise that tourists avoid visiting Ko Tao, with some British tabloids labelling it as "Death Island". Although tourist arrivals to the island dropped in the months immediately following the murders in 2014, there was little lasting effect.

=== Dive sites ===
Name	Max. depth	Visibility	Average depth	Level	Features	Marine life
Shark Island	28m	5-30m	15m	Open water +	Boulders and rock formations, soft corals. Drift diving for the experienced.	Resident turtle, great barracuda, titan triggerfish and clown triggerfish
Hin Wong Pinnacle	40 m	15–20 m	17 m	Open water +	Tabletop rock formation covered with a variety of hard and soft corals.	Hawksbill turtle, snapper, sweetlips, porcupine pufferfish, juvenile boxfish
Mango Bay	16 m	5–20 m	10 m	Beginner +	Only accessible by boat and suitable for training dives with a sandy bottom and shallow reef. Also accessible by a recently built road through the jungle from Sairee Beach	Small reef fish, pufferfish, moray eels
White rock	20 m	10–30 m	12 m	Open water +	A wide band of coral reef with a diversity of hard and soft corals.	Wrasses, butterflyfish, angelfish, moray eels, clownfish, and triggerfish.
Nang Yuan Pinnacle (Red Rock)	19 m	10–30 m	10 m	Open water +	A large boulder with swim-through arches and to the west a large cave to explore.	Giant whiptail ray, moray, pipefish, crabs, titan triggerfish and reef shark.
Twins	22 m	10–25 m	12 m	Open water +	Three groups of granite rocks covered in corals and sponges, divided by sandy patches and a backdrop of coral garden.	Bluespotted ribbontail ray, juvenile bluering angelfish, six-barred angelfish, clownfish, scorpionfish and pink anemone.
Green rock	28 m	10–30 m	16 m	Open water+	A maze of swim-throughs, canyons, caverns, and caves created by large boulders.	Yellow-margin and titan triggerfish, giant trevallies, cobias and stingrays, occasional reef shark sightings.
Japanese gardens	14 m	10–15 m	10 m	Beginner +	Hundreds of hard and soft coral formations creating the impression of an oriental garden. A dive boat also rests at around 15 meters, which was destroyed in the summer of 2009 and was towed to the site.	Abundance of small coral fish and a variety of nudibranchs.
Chumphon pinnacle	45 m	5–30 m	24 m	Experienced diver	Four granite pinnacles carpeted with anemones.	Whale shark (seasonal), giant grouper, barracuda, bull shark, batfish and tuna.
Southwest pinnacle	33 m	10–30 m	20 m	Advanced +	A collection of pinnacles with a unique topographical arrangement, giant fan corals.	Whale shark (seasonal), giant grouper, barracuda, occasional leopard shark.
Sail rock	45 m	15–35 m	30 m	All levels	Huge rock chimmey with a vertical swim-through that ascends from 18 m to 8 m. Amongst the Gulf of Thailands first diving sites	Large pelagics, king mackerel, tuna, whale shark and manta.

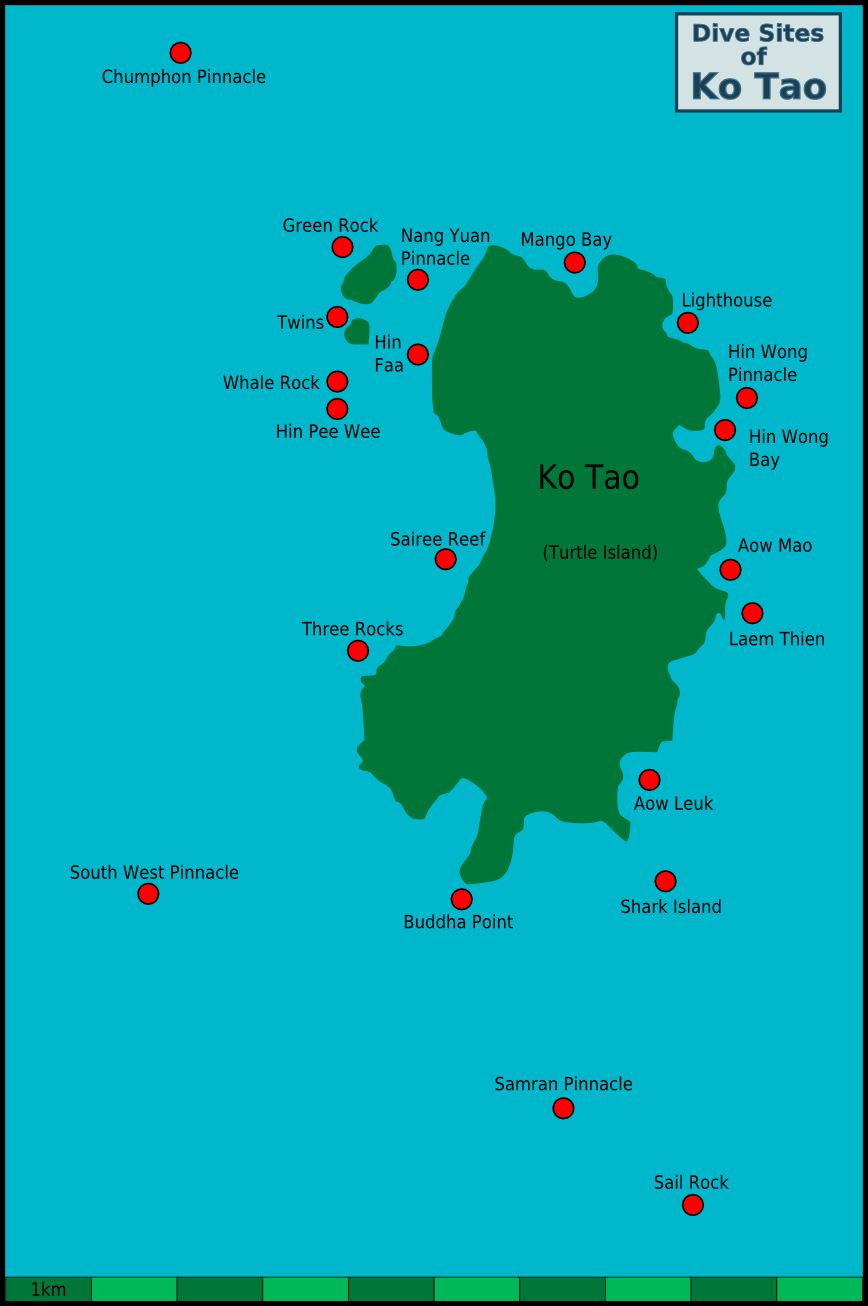
Map of scuba diving sites

== Population ==
To serve the tourist population, some 3,000–5,000 Burmese workers staff the island. There is a dominant Thai family on the island that owns several dive schools, resorts, and bars.

== Transportation ==
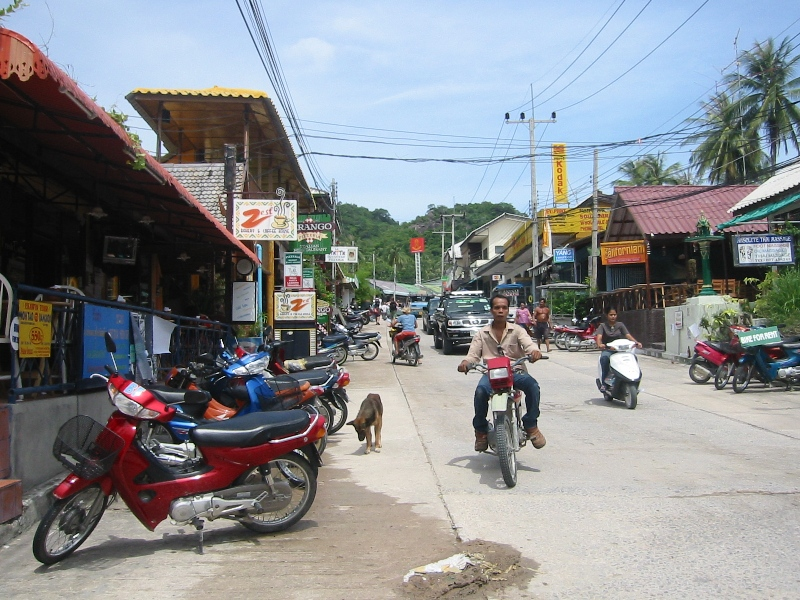
Main street, Ko Tao

Motorbikes are the main form of transport and the main cause of injury to tourists in the area.

== Ferries ==
Ferry companies Lomprayah, Seatran, and Songserm serve Ko Tao from:

- Surat Thani (4 hours day boat, 9 hours on overnight boat)
- Chumphon (1.5–3 hours, 7 hours on overnight boat)
- Ko Samui (approximately 2.5 hours)
- Ko Pha-ngan (approximately 1.5–2 hours).

All ferries dock at Ban Mae Haad. Journey times vary due to the different boats used by the various ferry companies.

== Air ==
Ko Tao has no airport, but connections to high speed catamarans and ferries are available at three airports.

- Chumphon Airport (CJM)
- Ko Samui Airport (USM)
- Surat Thani Airport (URT)

== Rail ==
Train services are available to Chumphon where ferries are available.

== See also ==
- List of islands of Thailand
