= Juntao =

Juntao may refer to:

== People ==
- Tao Jun (Three Kingdoms), general of Eastern Wu during the Three Kingdoms period of Chinese history
- Wang Juntao, Chinese dissident and democracy activist
- Juntao Zhu, co-founder and CEO of Hodlnaut

== Characters ==
- Juntao, the name of the crime boss in the 1998 film Rush Hour
- Jun Tao, a character in the television drama The Princess Weiyoung
- Tao Jun, a character in the manga and anime series Shaman King

== See also ==
- Jintao (disambiguation)
