= Towse =

Towse is a surname. Notable people with the name include:

- Beachcroft Towse (1864–1948), English Victoria Cross recipient
- David Towse (born 1968), English cricketer
- Edward Armstrong Towse (1905–1973), justice of the Territorial Supreme Court of Hawaii
- Gary Towse (born 1952), English footballer
- William Towse (c. 1551–1634), English parliamentarian

== See also ==
- Taos (disambiguation)
