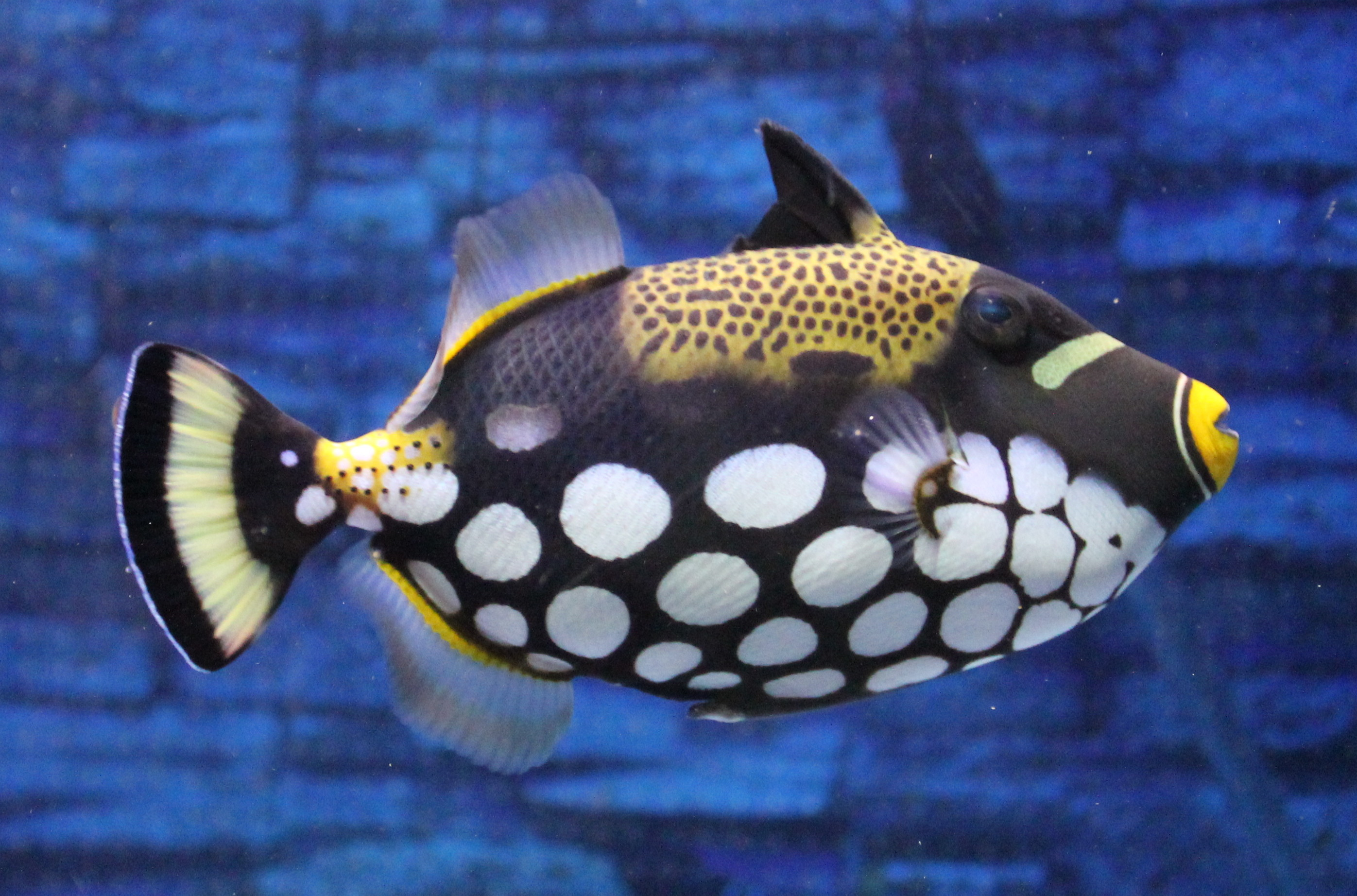
- Balistoides conspicillum
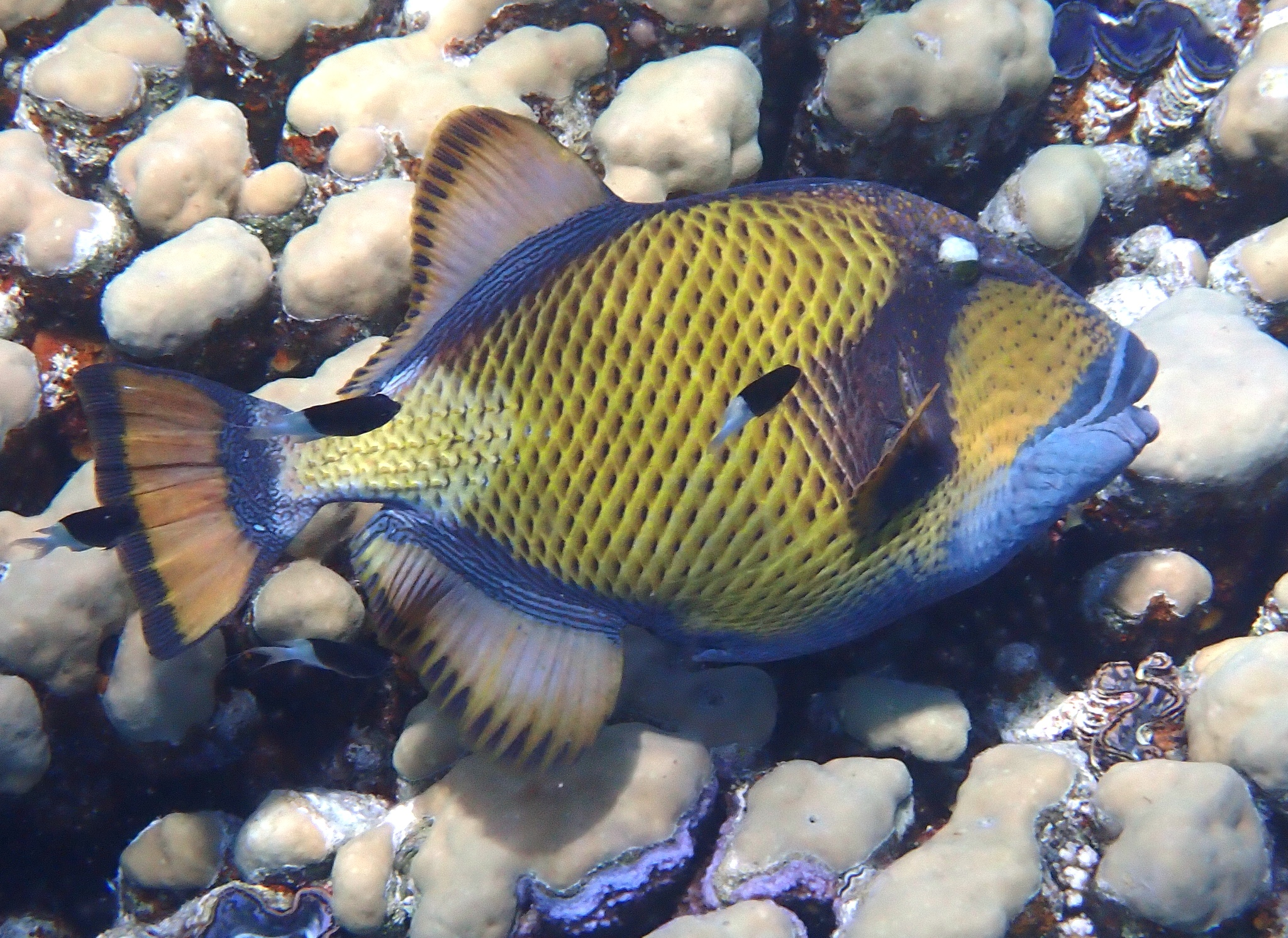
- Balistoides viridescens

Scientific classification
- Kingdom: Animalia
- Phylum: Chordata
- Class: Actinopterygii
- Division: Teleostei
- Order: Tetraodontiformes
- Family: Balistidae
- Genus: Balistoides; Fraser-Brunner, 1935

Type species
- Balistes viridescens Bloch & J. G. Schneider, 1801

Synonyms
- Guaperva Sonnerat (ex Willughby), 1774

= Balistoides =

Genus of fishes

Balistoides is a genus of marine ray-finned fishes belonging to the family Balistidae, the triggerfishes. The triggerfishes in this genus are found in the Indo-Pacific region.

== Taxonomy ==
Balistoides was first proposed as a genus in 1935 by the English ichthyologist Alec Fraser-Brunner with Balistes viridescens designated as its type species. B. viridescens had originally been described in 1801 by the German naturalists Marcus Elieser Bloch and Johann Gottlob Schneider with its type locality not given. Nevertheless, its type locality is Mauritius, as the description was based on Bernard Germain de Lacépède's Baliste verdatre.

A 2016 study found that Balistoides was not monophyletic with B. conspiciillum being sister to Balistapus, with Melichthys being its next closest relative, while B. viridescens was recovered as sister to Pseudobalistes. However, the 2016 study stated that the results concerning the "close association" of Balistapus undulatus and Balistoides conspicillum were only "moderately supported", and it has not resulted in the classification of the triggerfishes being changed.

=== Etymology ===
Balistoides sufffixes -oides onto Balistes and means "having the form of Balistes".

== Species ==
Balistoides contains 2 currently recognised species:

| Image | Scientific name | Common name |
|---|---|---|
| | Balistoides conspicillum (Bloch & J. G. Schneider, 1801) | Clown triggerfish |
| | Balistoides viridescens (Bloch & J. G. Schneider, 1801) | Titan triggerfish |

== Description ==
Balistoides triggerfishes have a laterally compressed caudal peduncle. The scales above the base of the pectoral fin and the gill slit are very enlarged and form a flexible tympanum. There is an obvious groove on the snout in front of the eye. The teeth in the jaw are white and do not prominently project. Almost all of the cheek is covered with scales except for a very small fold at the corner of the mouth. The dorsal and ventral profiles of the head are concave, straight or slightly convex. The body is not plain black or very dark blue but is marked with different-coloured blotches and lines.

B. viridescens has a maximum total length of 75 cm (30 in), while the maximum published total length of B. conspicillum is 50 cm (20 in).

== Distribution and habitat ==
Balistoides triggerfishes are found in the Indian and Western Pacific Oceans from the eastern coast of Africa east as far as the Tuamotus and Line Islands, south to northern Australia and north to southern Japan. The two species in this genus are associated with coral reefs, at depths down to 75 m (246 ft).
