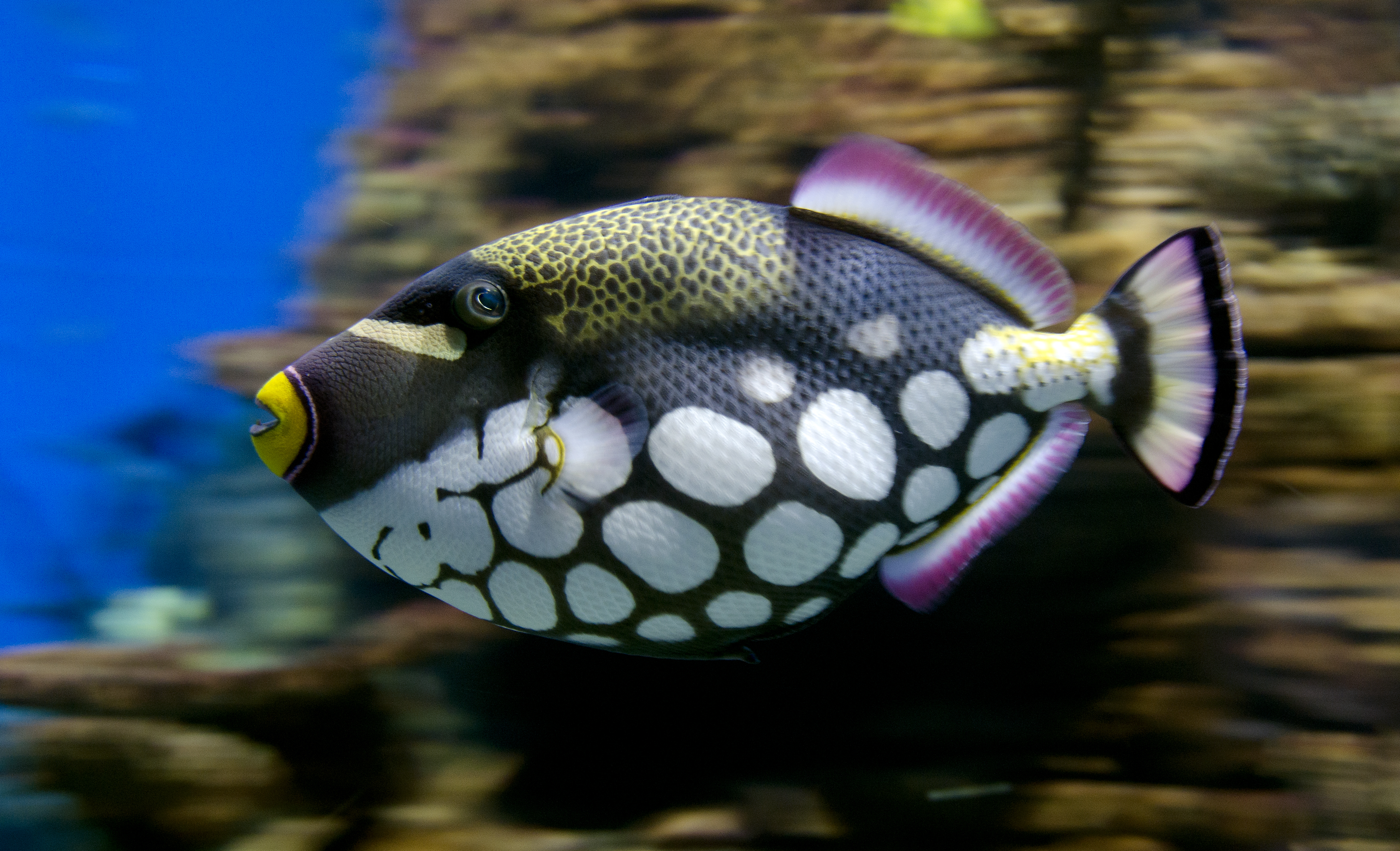
- At uShaka Marine World

Conservation status
- Least Concern (IUCN 3.1)

Scientific classification
- Kingdom: Animalia
- Phylum: Chordata
- Class: Actinopterygii
- Division: Teleostei
- Order: Tetraodontiformes
- Family: Balistidae
- Genus: Balistoides
- Species: B. conspicillum

Binomial name
- Balistoides conspicillum (Bloch & J. G. Schneider, 1801)

= Clown triggerfish =

Species of fish

The clown triggerfish (Balistoides conspicillum), also known as the bigspotted triggerfish, is a demersal marine fish.

== Taxonomy ==
Although it is in the genus Balistoides alongside the titan triggerfish (Balistoides viridescens), the genus is not monophyletic and requires revision. As a result, the clown and titan triggerfish are not each other's closest relatives. The clown triggerfish is possibly most closely related to species of the genus Melichthys and the orange-lined triggerfish (Balistapus undulatus).

== Description ==
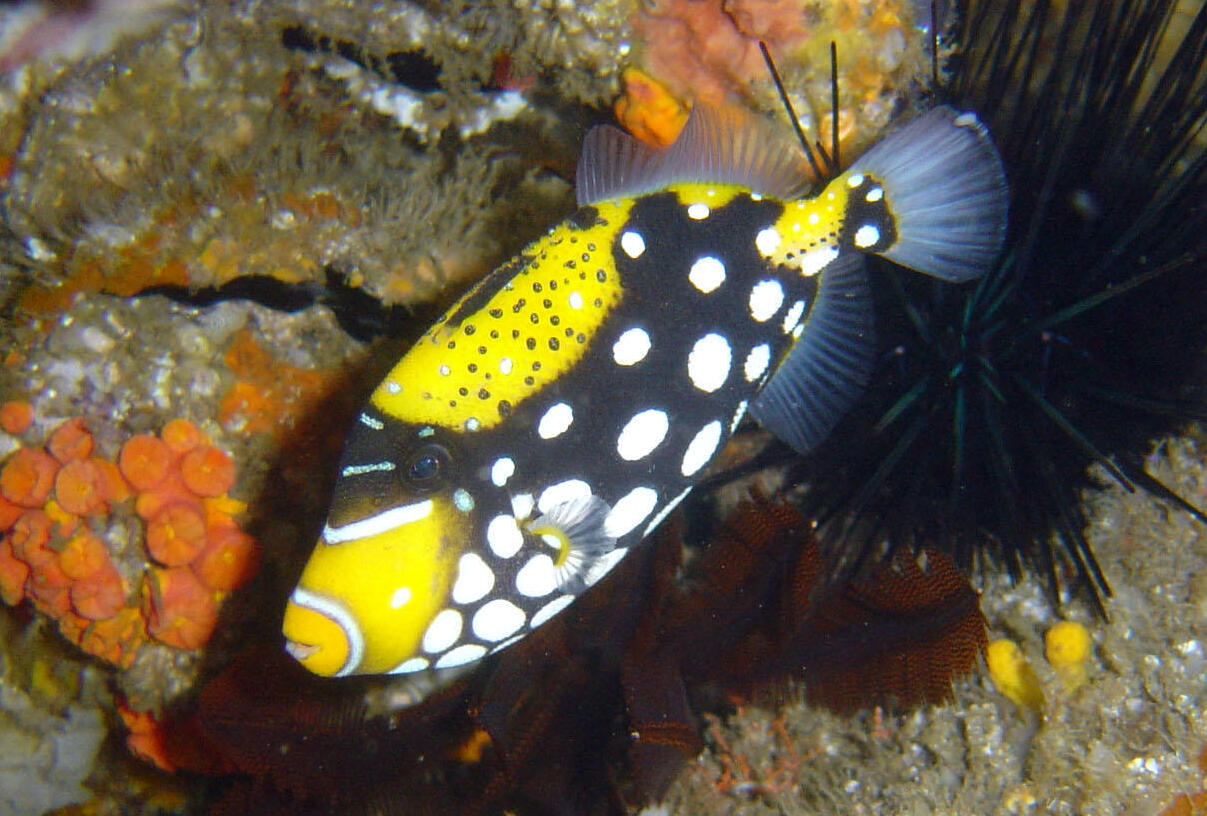
Juvenile, in South Africa

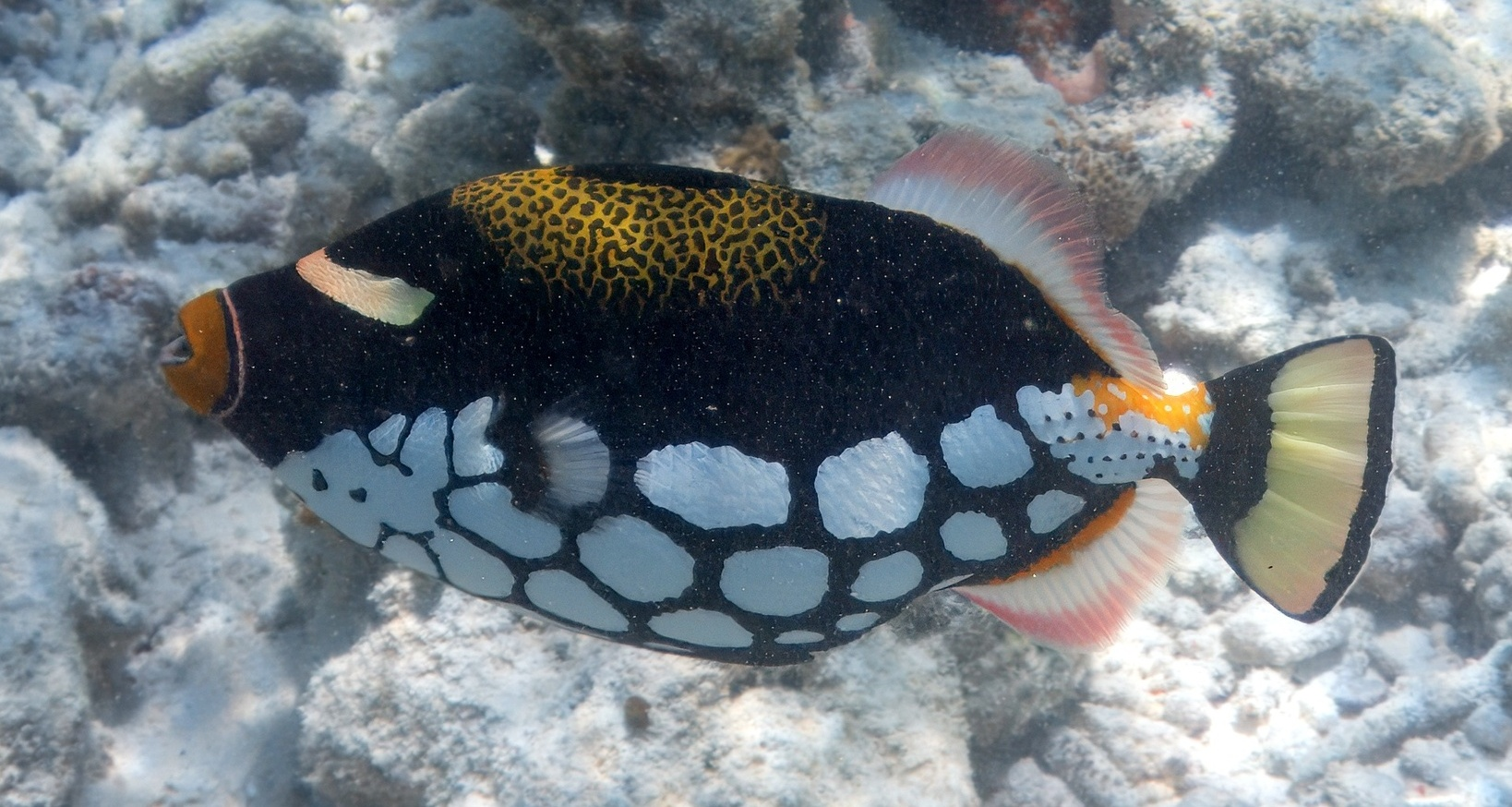
In the Maldives

The clown triggerfish is a fish which grows up to 50 cm (19.7 inches) in the wild, however not typically reaching this length in captivity. Its body has a stocky appearance, oval and compressed laterally in form. The head is large and represents approximately one third of the body length. The mouth is small, terminal and has strong teeth.

The first dorsal fin is composed of three spines, one of which is longer and stronger. It is erectile and hidden in a dorsal furrow. This set of dorsal spines composes a trigger system which is a characteristic from the family Balistidae. The second dorsal fin is similar in shape and size to the anal fin which is symmetrically opposed to it. The pelvic fin is reduced to a ventral protrusion.

The background coloration is black. Half of inferior part of the body is marked with large white rounded spots. The area around the first dorsal fin is crossed by bright yellow sinuosities which draw like a network reminiscent of leopard patterning. There is a yellow ring around the mouth, which is surrounded by another white ring. A white stripe rides the snout just under the eye level. The second dorsal fin and the anal fin are white and underlined with a yellow line at their base. The caudal peduncle has a yellowish blotch on its top part and has three horizontal sets of spiny scales. The caudal fin is yellowish in its center and has black margin. Juveniles have a black background coloration spangled with small white spots, with yellow coloration of the extremity of the snout and the base of the first dorsal fin.

Clown triggerfish scales are thick, weakly overlapping, with a rhomboid shape. Each scale has two layers: the topmost layer being bone and the lower layer being collagenous.

This fish has teeth that continuously grow. These teeth help them when feeding on crustaceans.

== Distribution and habitat ==
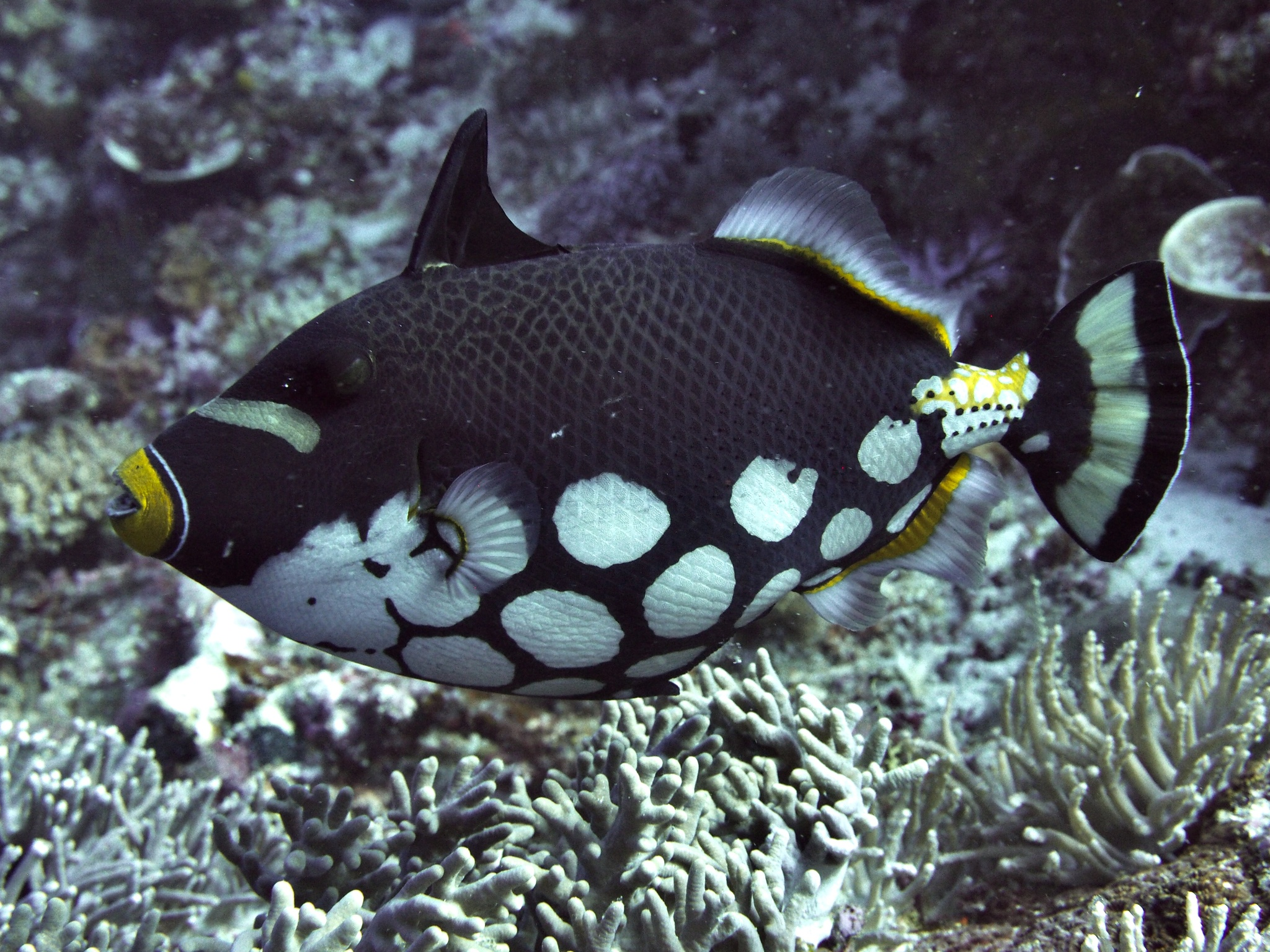
In Indonesia

The clown triggerfish is widely distributed throughout the tropical and subtropical waters of the Indian Ocean and in the western Pacific Ocean.

A single record was reported in the Mediterranean Sea in Spanish waters in 2012, a likely aquarium release. It is most commonly found along external reef slopes with clear water with a depth of 1–75 m. Juveniles usually stay below depths of 20 m, and inhabit caves or overhangs.

The clown triggerfish has also been documented in the Red Sea. This was also most likely due to an aquarium release.

== Biology ==
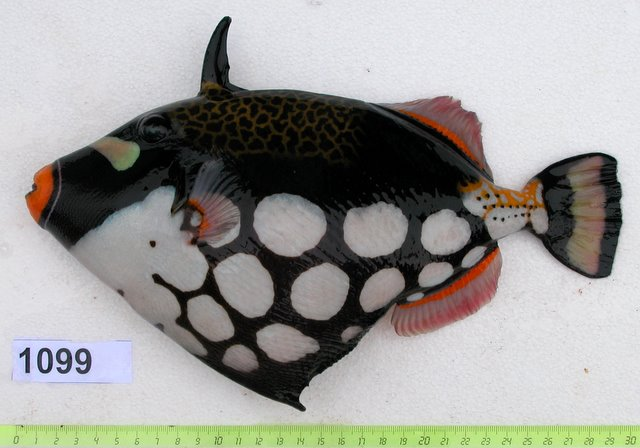
With fully extended dorsal and pelvic spines, in New Caledonia

Although the clown triggerfish is widely distributed, it occurs in low numbers in the wild. However, this fish can be locally abundant in areas with high biodiversity. These fish create harems after reaching one year of age. Though they are able to live up to 20 years, they reach sexual maturity at about one year.

The female lays her eggs while the male fertilizes them in sandy patches. From here, the parents will defend the nest, for about eight days, until the eggs hatch. The female clown triggerfish remains after the incubation period to care for the hatchlings. Typically, clown triggerfish spawn in deep water, which is where the young stay until they grow close to 20 cm.

== Feeding ==
Balistoides conspicillum has a varied diet based on different benthic organisms like molluscs, echinoderms, crustaceans and tunicates. They have also been recorded feeding on crinoids.

== Behaviour ==
The clown triggerfish is naturally diurnal, solitary and territorially defensive, making it an elusive find in its habitat. It can be very aggressive with other fish and congeners. Juvenile clown triggerfish are notably more sociable, becoming progressively less sociable and more aggressive as they age.

The first long dorsal spine is erected to impress an opponent or deter a predator, preventing it from being pulled out of its shelter.

When the clown triggerfish is in danger it hides in holes. It is capable of locking the spine on their dorsal fin in place, while also locking their smaller dorsal and ventral fin in place. This makes it harder for the fish to be pulled out of their hiding hole.

== In aquariums ==
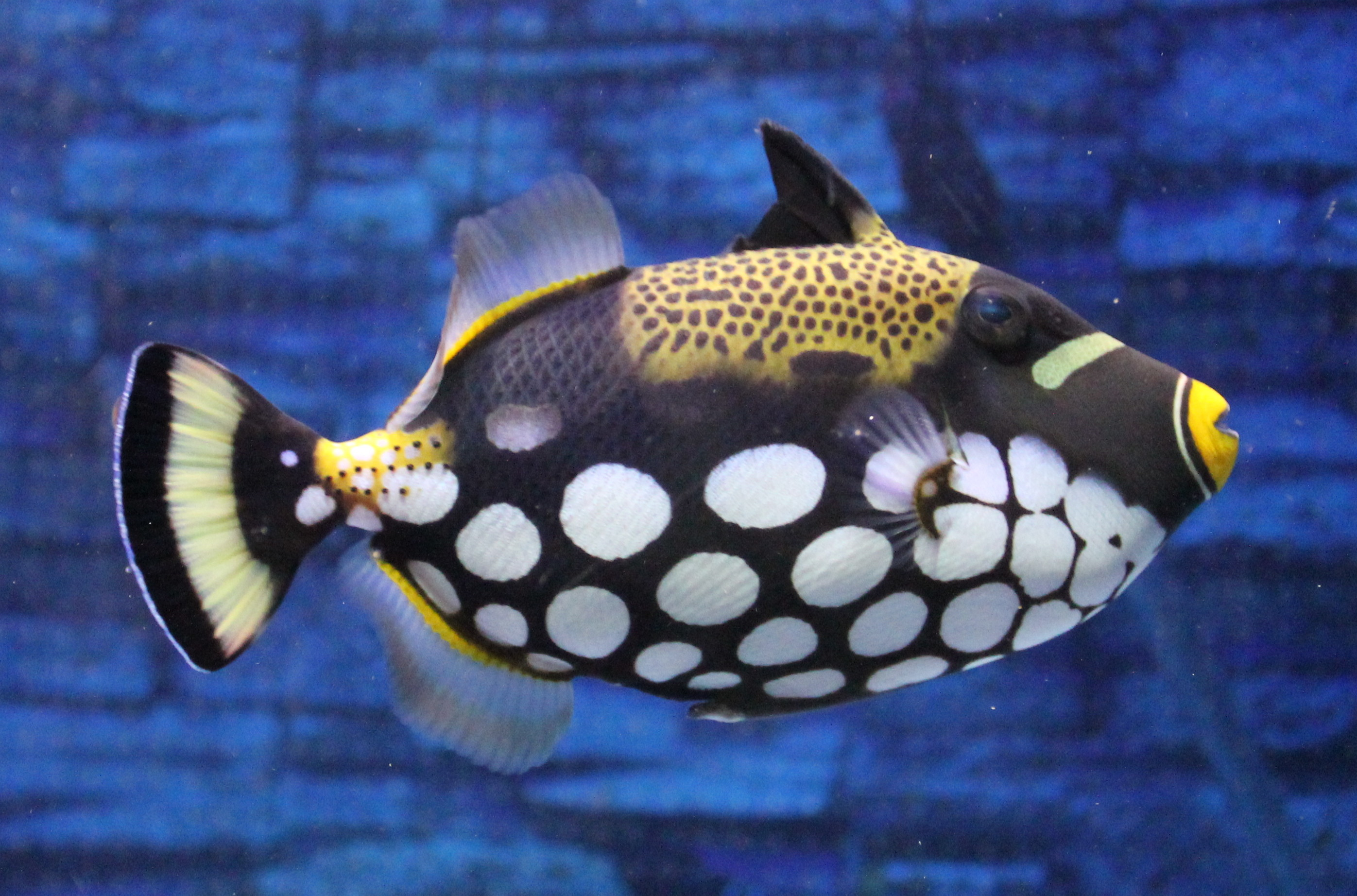
At Yehliu Ocean World

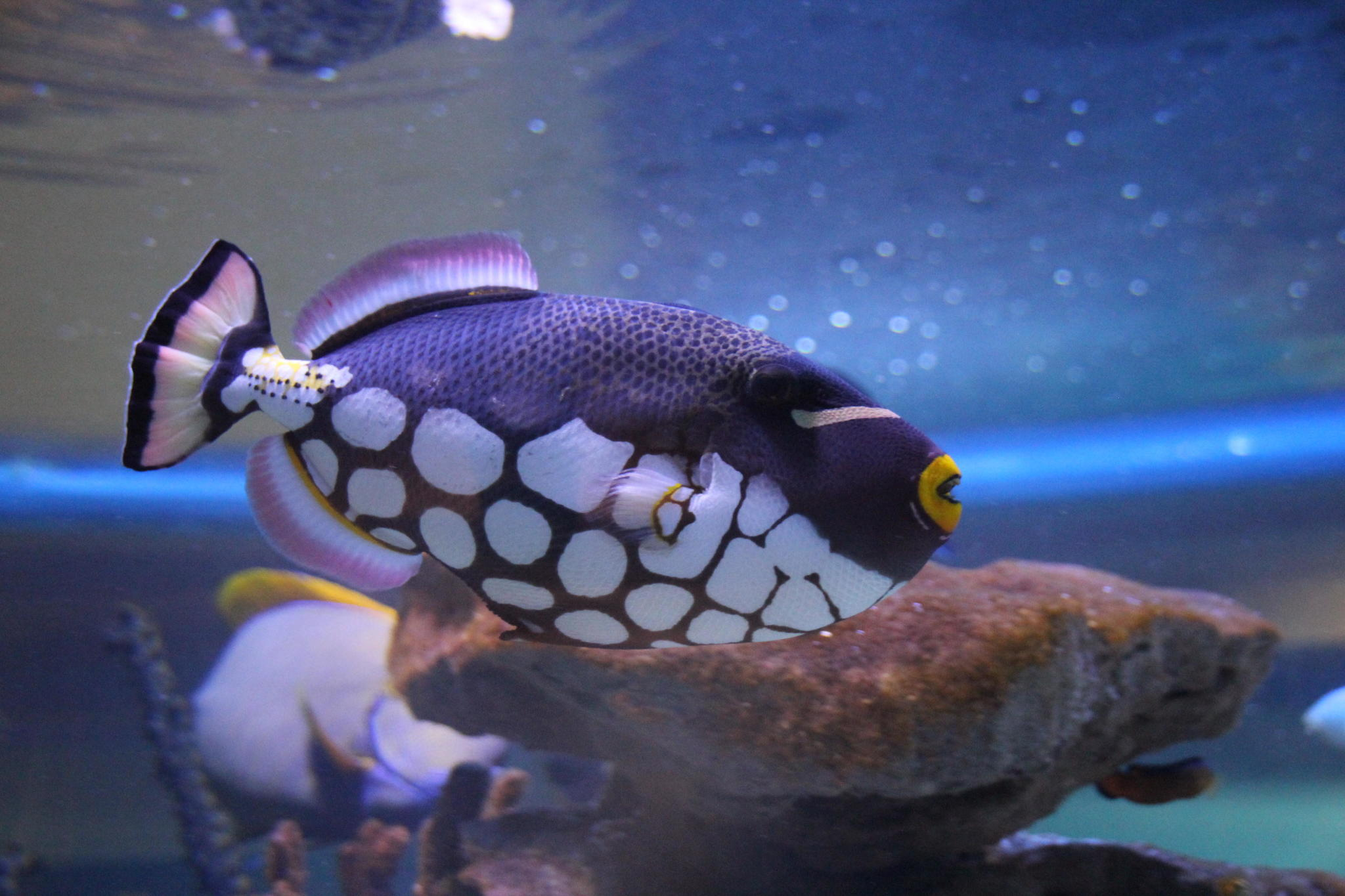
At Two Oceans Aquarium

Unusual "ringed" colour pattern, at the Aquarium of Genoa

This fish is in demand to keep in aquariums. All captive specimens are caught in the wild, impacting local populations. Juvenile clown triggerfish are sought out after more than adults since juveniles are less aggressive towards other fish. Like many other triggerfish, they require a large aquarium and will display aggression towards other fish. It should not be kept with small fish. Clown triggerfish can be housed with other large fish species such as moray eels and angelfish, but they thrive when kept alone. They will also prey on any invertebrates in the aquarium. This fish can become tame enough to be hand-fed; however, one should beware of the fish's sharp teeth. They have been known to take out chunks of flesh while being hand-fed.

Decor in their tanks must be tough, as clown triggerfish will attack them.

The clown triggerfish, like any triggerfish, should not be one of the first fish added to an aquarium. They should be one of the last fish introduced into an aquarium as this will discourage predation and aggression towards other fish. Any fish or crustaceans introduced into an aquarium after a clown triggerfish is typically seen as food and attacked quickly.

== Conservation status ==
The clown triggerfish is of least concern, however, this fish has been introduced into different ecosystems in different parts of the world. One place in particular is the Red Sea, in which the clown triggerfish was introduced, most likely intentionally, by a private aquarium keeper. This sea has a fragile ecosystem that has been under considerable stress from human impacts. One of the concerns is that the clown triggerfish that have been released into the wild may contain harmful bacteria that can impact wild fish.

Due to the clown triggerfish most likely being intentionally introduced, there could be potentially harmful effects of its newfound presence in various ecosystems, though these effects have not fully been recorded. Occasionally, clown triggerfish are sighted in the Mediterranean. While introduced reef fish species typically do not successfully establish in the Mediterranean, certain reef fish species have enough behavioural plasticity to successful invade non-native Mediterranean habitats.
