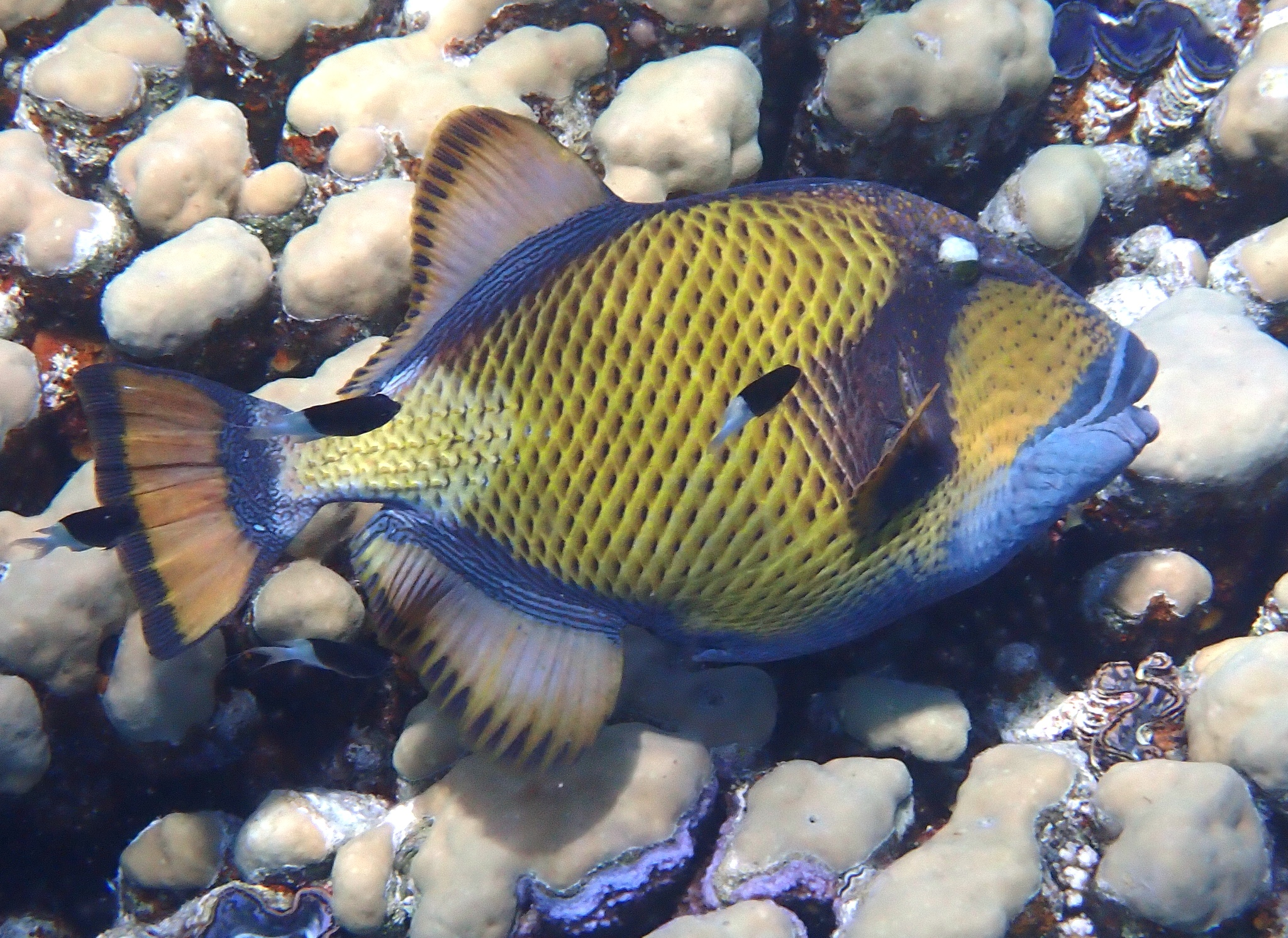

Conservation status
- Least Concern (IUCN 3.1)

Scientific classification
- Kingdom: Animalia
- Phylum: Chordata
- Class: Actinopterygii
- Order: Tetraodontiformes
- Family: Balistidae
- Genus: Balistoides
- Species: B. viridescens

Binomial name
- Balistoides viridescens (Bloch & J. G. Schneider, 1801)

= Titan triggerfish =

Species of fish

The titan triggerfish, giant triggerfish or moustache triggerfish (Balistoides viridescens) is a large species of triggerfish found in lagoons and at reefs to depths of 50 m (160 ft) in most of the Indo-Pacific, though it is absent from Hawaii. With a length of up to 75 centimetres (30 in), it is the largest species of triggerfish in its range (the stone triggerfish, Pseudobalistes naufragium, from the east Pacific is larger).

== Behavior ==
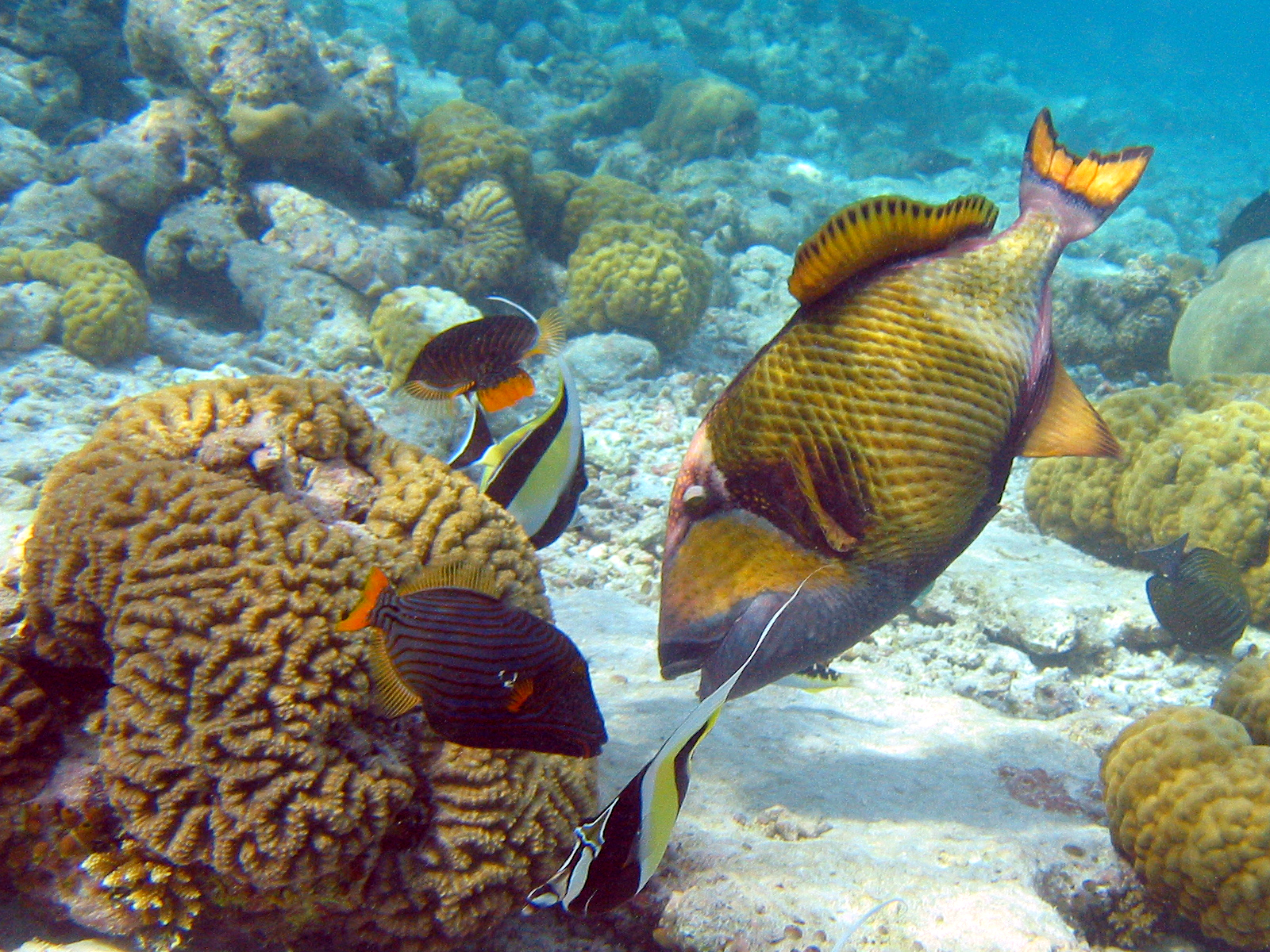
With orange-lined triggerfish and moorish idols, in the Maldives.

The titan triggerfish is diurnal and solitary. It feeds on sea urchins, molluscs, crustaceans, tube worms and coral.

It often feeds by turning over rocks, stirring up sand and biting off pieces of branching coral. This is why other smaller fish species are often seen around it, as they feed on the detritus and smaller organisms that are stirred up. Titan triggerfish are one of a number of species of fish which can hunt and eat the crown-of-thorns starfish.

Titan triggerfish have been observed being aggressive to other fish who enter their territory.

== Interaction with humans ==
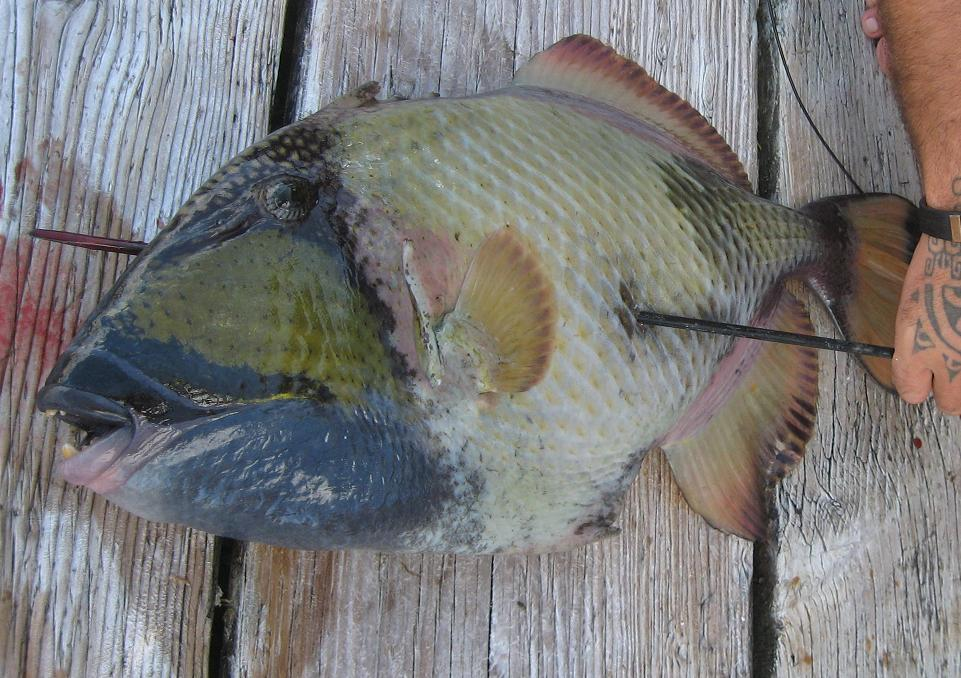
Speared in French Polynesia

Though titan triggerfish are usually wary of divers and snorkelers, females can be territorial and aggressive around their nests during the reproduction season, which occurs for about a week in each month (either after the full moon or new moon, depending on the population).

The nest is placed in a flat sandy area, and is defended vigorously against any intruders. The territory around the nest is roughly cone-shaped and divers who accidentally enter it may be attacked. Divers should swim horizontally away from the nest rather than upwards which would only take them further into the territory. Although bites are not venomous, the strong teeth can inflict serious injury that may require medical attention.

The threat posture includes the triggerfish facing the intruder while holding its first dorsal spine erect. It may also roll onto its side, allowing it a better look at the intruder it perceives as threatening its nest. The titan triggerfish will not always bite, but can swim at snorkellers and divers escorting them out of their territory.

The flesh of the titan triggerfish is sometimes ciguatoxic.

== Gallery ==
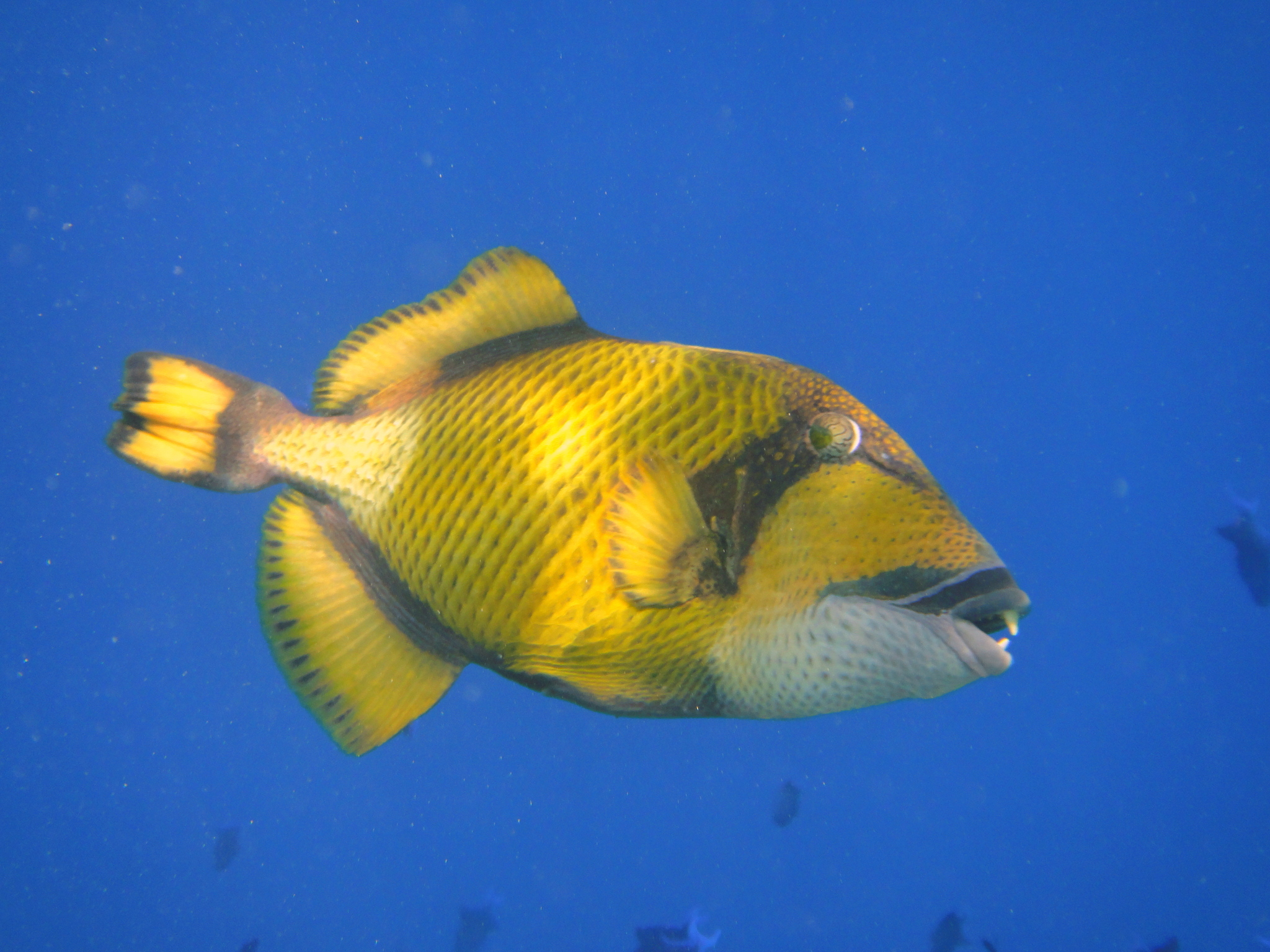
Maldives

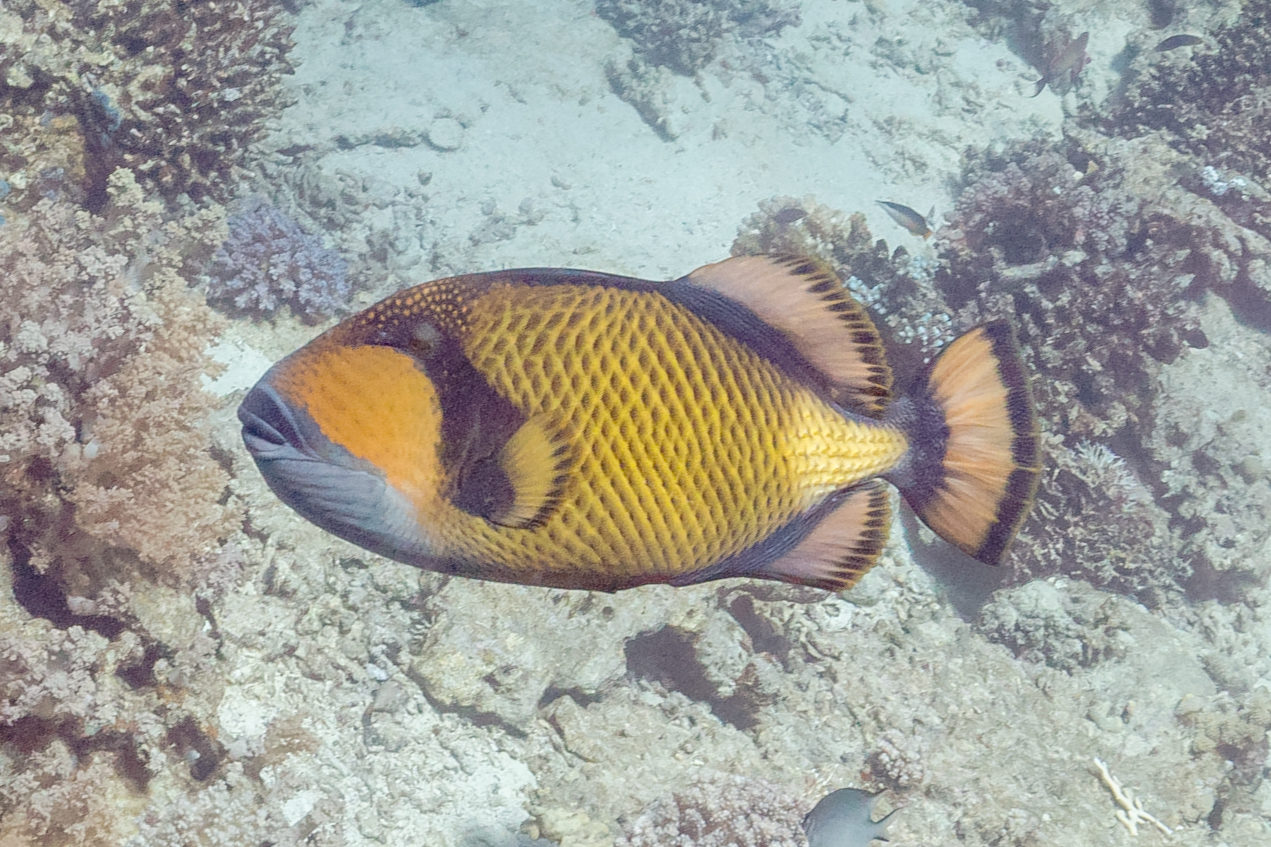
Red Sea

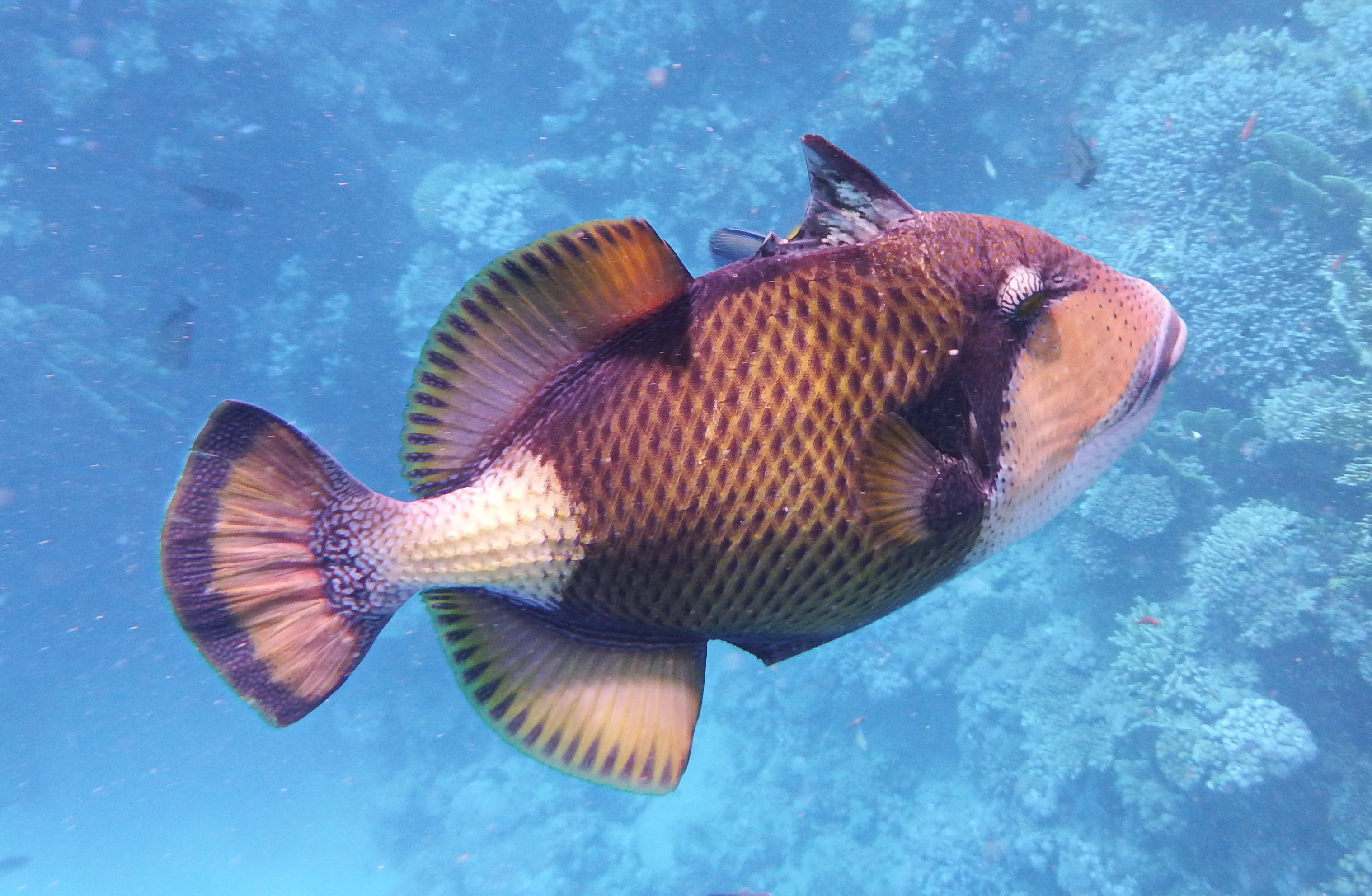
Red Sea, with extended dorsal spine
