= Tao (disambiguation) =

Tao is a metaphysical concept found in Taoism, Confucianism, and more generally in ancient Chinese philosophy that represents the force of nature.

Tao may also refer to:

== Arts and entertainment ==
=== Games and comics ===
- Tao, a fictional character from the comic book Wildcats
- Tao Jun, the fictional female character from the manga and anime Shaman King
- Tao Pai Pai, the fictional character in Dragon Ball media
- Tao Ren, the fictional male character from the manga and anime Shaman King
- Tao (video game), a post-industrial video game for the Famicom
- Hu Tao (Genshin Impact), video game character

=== Music ===
- Tao (album), an album by Rick Springfield
- T.A.O (EP), by Z.Tao
- Tao (musical troupe), a Japanese drum and dance ensemble
- Tao (song), a single by Do As Infinity
- TAO, Together as One (festival), a large rave held New Year's Eve in Los Angeles

== Companies and organisations ==
- Tailored Access Operations, a cyber espionage unit within the US National Security Agency
- Tao Group Hospitality, an American multinational restaurant and nightclub operator
  - Tao Asian Bistro, a chain of high-end Asian fusion restaurants and nightclubs
- Tao Group (software), a defunct British software company
- TAO (collective), a radical tech organization based in Canada

== Medicine ==
- Thromboangiitis obliterans, Buerger's disease, a type of vasculitis
- Thyroid-associated orbitopathy, an autoimmune inflammatory disorder of the orbit and periorbital tissues
- Troleandomycin, an antibiotic

== Places ==
- Tao (historical region), part of the Georgian Tao-Klarjeti principalities
- Tao, Mali, a commune in the Cercle of Koutiala, Mali
- Tao River, a tributary of the Yellow River in Gansu Province, China
- Ko Tao, an island in the Gulf of Thailand
- Qingdao Jiaodong International Airport (IATA airport code)

== Science and technology ==
- Motorola Droid (codename: Tao), an Android smartphone
- University of Tokyo Atacama Observatory, a 6.5m observatory in Chile, operated by the University of Tokyo (2024)
- Tamke-Allan Observatory, in Tennessee, United States (1998)
- TAO (e-Testing platform) (Testing Assisté par Ordinateur), software
- TAO (software), The ACE ORB, open source software
- Ten Acre Observatory, in Oklahoma, United States
- Tropical Atmosphere Ocean project, a project to map the tropical Pacific Ocean
- Track At Once, an optical disc recording mode
- Tactical Action Officer, in the U.S. Navy

== People ==
- Tao (surname), Chinese surname (陶, Táo)
- Tào (surname), the Vietnamese surname based on the Chinese surname Cáo (曹)
- Terence Tao (born 1975), Australian-American mathematician
- Seqenenre Tao (reigned from 1560 or 1558–1555 BC), Egyptian ruler of Thebes
- Tao Geoghegan Hart (born 1995), British cyclist
- Tao Johnson (born 2003), American football player
- Tao Okamoto (born 1985), Japanese model and actress
- Tao Tsuchiya (born 1995), Japanese actress
- Huang Zitao (黄子韬, born 1993), Chinese rapper, actor and martial artist
- Antwuan "Tao" Simpson, American singer of Dru Hill band
- Somchai Kemglad (born 1974), Thai actor and singer

== Other uses ==
- Tao people, also known as the Yami, a Taiwanese aboriginal peoples, native to outlying Orchid Island
- Yami language (ISO 639-3 code: tao)

== See also ==
- Taos (disambiguation)
- Tau (disambiguation)
