= Hodlnaut =

Singapore-based cryptocurrency company

- Type: Cryptocurrency
- Founded: 2019
- Founders: Juntao Zhu (Co-founder); Simon Lee (Co-founder)
- Defunct: August 2022
- Headquarters: Singapore
- Key people: Juntao, Zhu (CEO)
- Products: Crypto interest earning; Crypto lending; Bitcoin, Wrapped Bitcoin, Ethereum, USDC, USDT, Dai
- Number of employees: 40+ previously~10 as of 19 August 2022
- Website: www.hodlnaut.com

Hodlnaut was a Singapore-based cryptocurrency lending and borrowing platform.Co-founded by Juntao Zhu and Simon Lee in 2019, it is advertised as a platform that allows users to earn interest on cryptocurrencies that they deposit through those funds being safely lent out to carefully selected institutions.

On 8 August 2022, it disabled the ability of users to withdraw their cryptocurrencies from the platform citing market conditions, however it later became known that Hodlnaut had actually been holding virtually all of its users' deposited funds in the TerraUSD stablecoin which had collapsed in May leading to the massive loss of users funds. The collapse of TerraUSD has similarly led to the bankruptcy of hedgefund Three Arrows Capital and lender Celsius Network. IT

== History ==
CEO Zhu has previously worked with Credit Suisse before co-founding Hodlnaut with Lee (CTO and co-founder of Hodlnaut). Hodlnaut is a portfolio company of Antler – a global VC firm that backs early-stage startups.

On 3 February 2021, Crowe Singapore performed an independent verification exercise to validate US$106 million in crypto assets held by Hodlnaut.

On 15 March 2022, Hodlnaut secured an In-Principle Approval for their Token Swap service from the Monetary Authority of Singapore (MAS) for a Major Payment Institution License.

Once all conditions would have been met, both Digital Treasures Center (DTC) and Hodlnaut would have been able to provide cryptocurrency services in Singapore under the Payment Services Act.

=== Collapse ===
In May 2022, the algorithmic US Dollar-stablecoin known as TerraUSD or UST, started to fail in holding its 1:1 peg with the US Dollar. UST, which is native to the Terra Blockchain, was a very popular coin up until that point due to the availability of Anchor Protocol, a decentralized application on the Terra Blockchain that allowed UST to be allocated to the protocol and receive interest at a rate of ~20% on a yearly basis. Taking advantage of the high interest, Hodlnaut allocated a significant amount of user-deposited crypto onto the Terra blockchain without disclosing, and allegedly denied, their direct involvement in activities on the Terra blockchain beyond the UST deposited by users themselves. Following the collapse of UST, the stake that Hodlnaut held in the coin lost a majority of its value and Hodlnaut became insolvent to its users. Hodlnaut allowed users to continue to deposit and withdraw crypto to the platform as per usual.

On 14 July 2022, the Singapore Police Force (SPF) demanded that Hodlnaut transfer the remaining assets that were left to them, this was not revealed to the users of the platform, deposits and withdrawals remained active as per usual. Hodlnaut subsequently applied to squash the order by the SPF.

On 8 August 2022, Hodlnaut suspended all withdrawal functionality from user accounts citing 'recent market conditions', and withdrew their application with the Monetary Authority of Singapore.

Around 16 August 2022, Hodlnaut revealed filing an application with the local high court to be placed under judicial management. They nominated Tam Chee Chong, director at Kairos Corporate Advisory, to serve as interim judicial manager. The application protects the company from legal proceedings. Sam Trade and S.A.M Fintech countered the proposal of Tam's nomination with their own picks, members of Grant Thornton accounting: Rajagopalan Seshadri, Paresh Jotangia and Ho May Kee. The interim judicial management hearing will take place on 26 August.

On 19 August 2022, Hodlnaut revealed proceedings with SPF and that it had culled 40 employees amounting to 80% of what they previously had before the culling. At this date Hodlnaut also officially revealed having been involved in the terra blockchain, however, cited it as only one of the reasons that Hodlnaut has become insolvent, alongside the decrease in the price of cryptocurrencies overall and large amounts of user withdrawals.

On its blog post of the same date, Hodlnaut revealed that as of 8 August, it was down 69 cents to the dollar, owing a total of S$391M (~$281M) to the users of its platform and having only S$122M ($88M) remaining. It turns out that Hodlnaut had converted $317M of user deposited funds (almost everything) into the algorithmic US Dollar stablecoin, TerraUSD, and placed it in decentralised application Anchor Protocol. When the TerraUSD algorithm failed and allowed the price of TerraUSD to slide from $1 to ~$0.02, the funds were converted out of TerraUSD, but by the time the funds were converted, $189.7M of the value was gone.

On 30 August, the Singapore High Court granted Hodlnaut judicial management with Angela Ee and Aaron Loh of EY Corporate Advisors Pte. as the interim judicial managers.

In November, SPF announced that it is investigating Hodlnaut and its directors for potential cheating and fraud.

The IJMs proposed a restructuring plan, which include existing Hodlnaut's directors to continue managing the business, which was rejected by key creditors in January 2023 who preferred to liquidate the company. In February, it was reported several potential investors were interested in buying over Hodlnaut. In November, the Singapore High Court ordered Hodlnaut to liquidate with Ee and Loh, the initial interim judicial managers, appointed as joint liquidators.

On 26 May 2026, CEO Zhu Juntao was charged with fraud.
