= Orange-lined triggerfish =

- In the Philippines

Conservation status
- Least Concern (IUCN 3.1)

Scientific classification
- Kingdom: Animalia
- Phylum: Chordata
- Class: Actinopterygii
- Division: Teleostei
- Order: Tetraodontiformes
- Family: Balistidae
- Genus: Balistapus; Tilesius, 1820
- Species: B. undulatus

Binomial name
- Balistapus undulatus (M. Park, 1797)

Synonyms
- List: Balistes undulatus Park, 1797; Balistes aculeatus minor Forsskål, 1775; Balistes minor Forsskål, 1775; Balistes lineatus Bloch & Schneider, 1801; Balsitapus capistratus Tilesius, 1820; Balistes aculeatus viridis Bennett, 1828; Balistes sesquilineatus Lay & Bennett, 1839; Balistes schmitti Bleeker, 1852; Balistes porcatus Gronow, 1854; Balistes elioti Day, 1889; Balistes theresae Curtiss, 1938

Species of fish

The orange-lined triggerfish (Balistapus undulatus), also known as the orangestripe triggerfish, red-lined triggerfish, striped triggerfish or vermiculated triggerfish, is a species of marine ray-finned fish belonging to the family Balistidae, the triggerfishes. This species is the only species in the monospecific genus Balistapus, which is closely related to the genus Balistoides, if that genus is reclassified as a monospecific genus with the clown triggerfish as its only species. The orange-lined triggerfish has a wide Indo-Pacific range.

== Taxonomy ==
The orange-lined triggerfish was first described as Balistes aculeatus minor in 1775 by the Swedish explorer, naturalist and orientalist Peter Forsskål but this name was never in common usage and it has been recommended that an application be made to the International Commission on Zoological Nomenclature to have this name suppressed under Article 23.2 of the International Code of Zoological Nomenclature. The name in widespread and common usage which should be preserved under Article 23.2 is Balistes undulatus, a name given to this taxon by the Scottish explorer Mungo Park in 1797. Park gave the type locality of B. undulatus as Bengkulu Province in Sumatra, Indonesia. In 1820 Wilhelm Gottlieb Tilesius von Tilenau described Balistapus capistratus, classifying it a new monospecific genus, Balistapus. Tilesius's B. capistratus is now considered to be a synonym of Park's Balistes undulatus.

The orange-lined triggerfish has tentatively been found to be closely related to Balistoides conspicillum, with the genus Balistoides being found to be polyphyletic.

== Etymology ==
The monotypic genus Balistapus combines suffixes -a, meaning "without" and pus, which means "foot" with Balistes, as Park described it as being without pelvic fins, but like all triggerfishes, the pelvic fins are hidden in the skin and joined together to form a spine ending in very short rays, but in this taxon reduced to a bump on the ventral surface. The specific name, undulatus, refers to the wavy orange lines, which Park described as red, on the body of this fish.

== Distribution and habitat ==
While other balistoid fishes, such as the filefish and leatherjacks, are typically found all across the Indo-western Pacific, the triggerfish are typically found in coral reefs ecosystems, coral lagoons, and external reef slopes within this area, as well off the coast of East Africa, the Red Sea, and Japan. They tend to stay around their burrows and dens within the reef. Within coral reefs, the orange-lined triggerfish are more versatile than other triggerfish species and can be found at depths up to 50 meters, although studies have found that they prefer depths of 2 to 8 meters. No relationship between the area of the reef and depth has been found in juveniles, and adults were found to vary their depth based on the region; in general, the species was found to have a broad distribution across the reef. There is also a difference between the types of substrata that the adults and juvenile orange-lined triggerfish prefer: the adults were found to prefer rock and branching coral, while the juvenile fish were found to prefer softer surfaces.

== Description ==
The orange-lined triggerfish has a dark brown to dark green body with orange lines that start behind the head and cover the rest of its body. Their maximum body size is about 30 centimeters. Its body has a stocky appearance, oval shape, and is compressed laterally. The head is large and is about one third of the body length. The mouth is small and terminal and it has strong teeth.

The first dorsal fin has three spines, one of which is longer and stronger than the other. It is erectile and kept in a dorsal furrow at rest. The second dorsal fin is similar in shape and size to the anal fin, which is symmetrically opposed to it. The pelvic fin is reduced to a ventral protrusion. They also typically have a large block spot by their peduncular spines, and the caudal fin is orange.

In general, males tend to be larger and lack a concave snout, and also lose the lines on their snouts as they mature. Females and juveniles are smaller and have a concave snout.

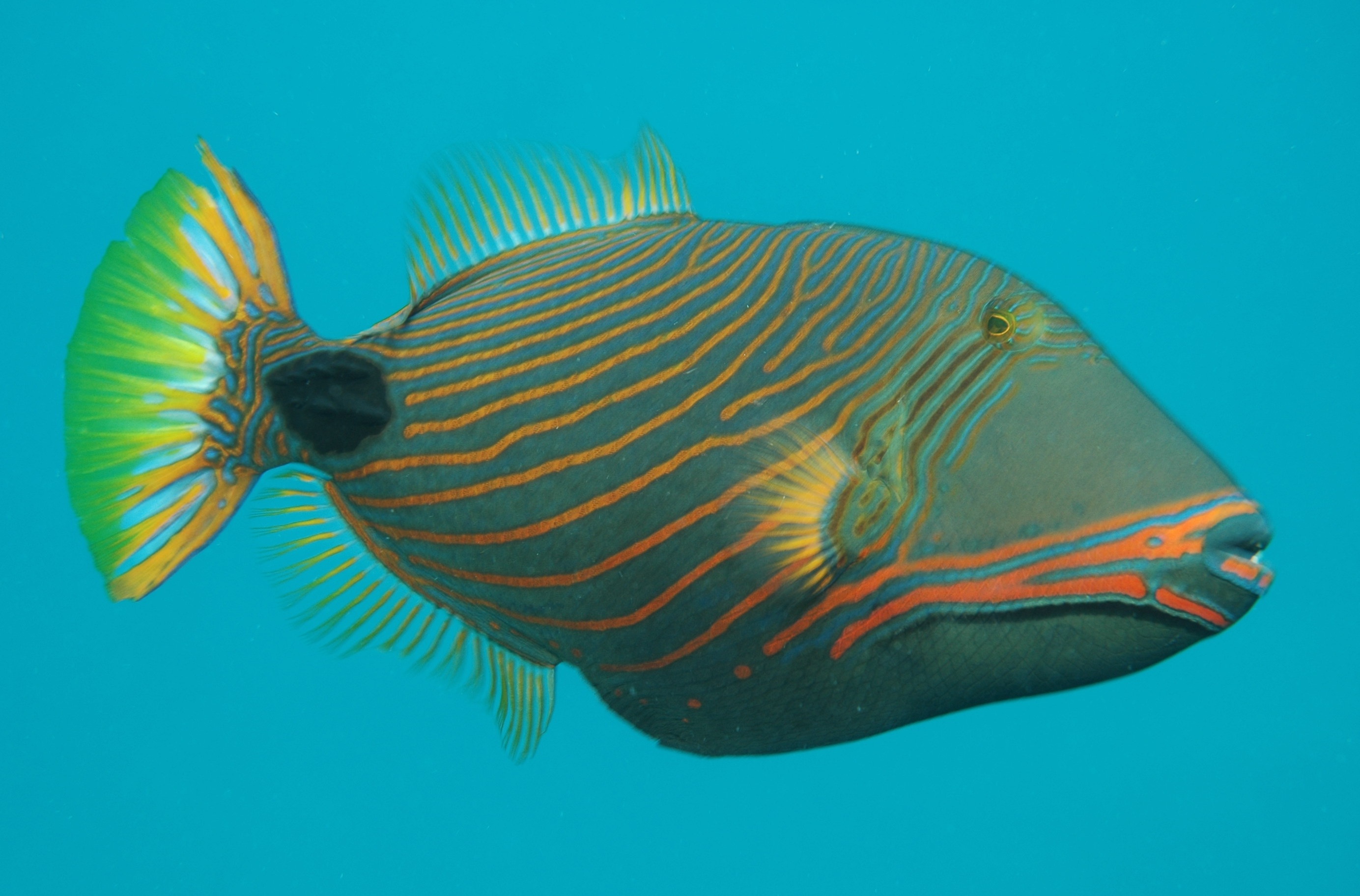
Pacific Ocean (Great Barrier Reef)

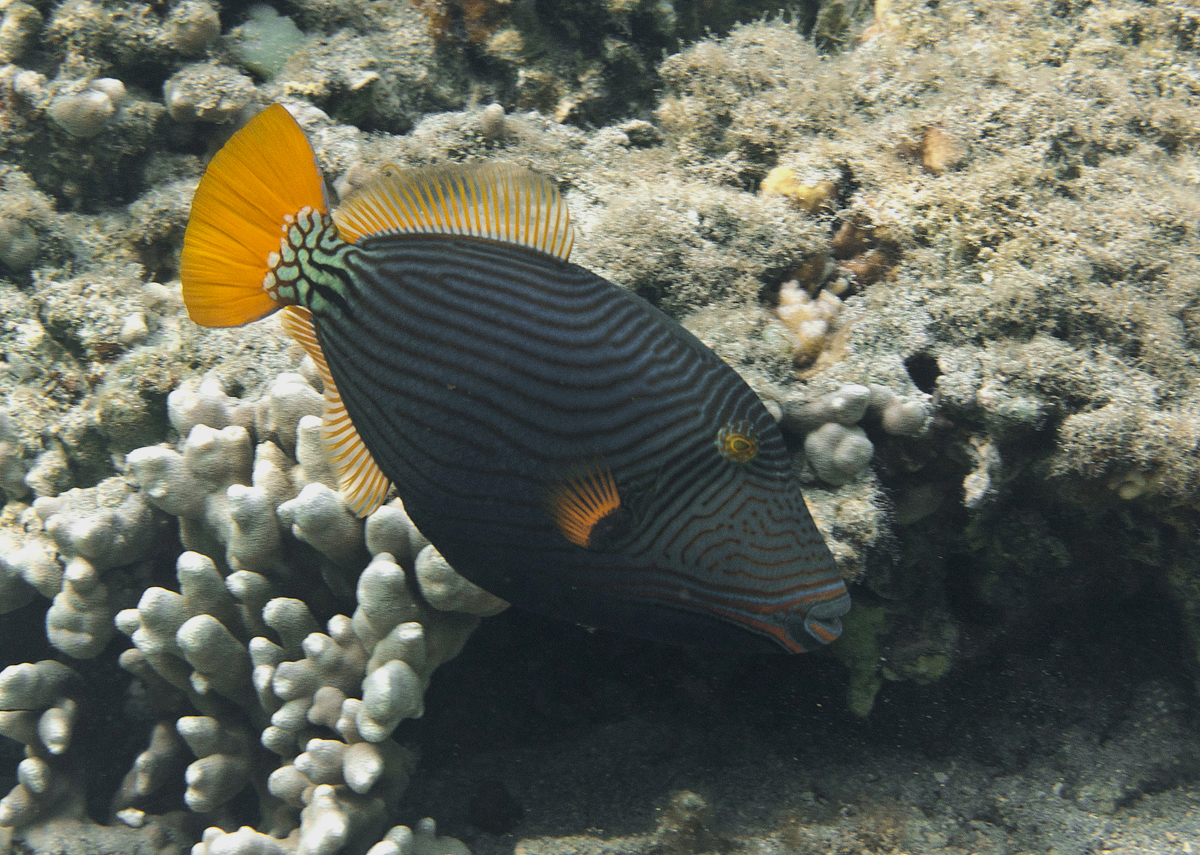
Indian Ocean (Réunion)

Red Sea

== Ecological role and feeding ==
In the Philippines

The orange-lined triggerfish is an omnivorous feeder that can, because of its strong and heavy teeth, tackle a variety of benthic prey. Observed food items include cnidarians, molluscs, ctenophores, crustaceans, other fish, algae, and echinoderms. This species in particular, given its broad diet and distribution, is a crucial component in coral reef ecosystems through top-down control and especially through consumption of sea-urchins. The orange-lined triggerfish is a main and dominant predator of the burrowing urchin (Echinometra mathaei) in East African marine parks. Before being protected, the population was overfished, which allowed the burrowing sea urchin population to grow rapidly. In these ecosystems, the burrowing sea urchin affects coral reef health, the presence of other grazers and algae, and erosion. With all three of these influences intertwined, the burrowing sea urchin has the ability to degrade coral reef ecosystems if they are not being controlled by predators, such as the orange-lined triggerfish. When compared to other predators of the burrowing sea urchin in the East African marine parks, the orange-lined triggerfish was found to consume more burrowing sea urchins than others, which exemplifies this species' influence on coral reef ecosystems.

== Behaviour ==
The orange-lined triggerfish prefers parts of the reef where there are a lot of places to hide and are able to slide sideways into crevices or small openings to evade predation. Typically encountered as solitary fishes, their territory may overlap multiple female territories which are defended against intruding congeners. Once the female has accepted the male, the eggs are deposited on the substrate for the male to fertilise. The female then guards the eggs from predators. Triggerfish have a varied diet consisting of algae, sponges, crustaceans, molluscs, algae, sea urchins, tunicates, worms, fish eggs and detritus.

== Gallery ==
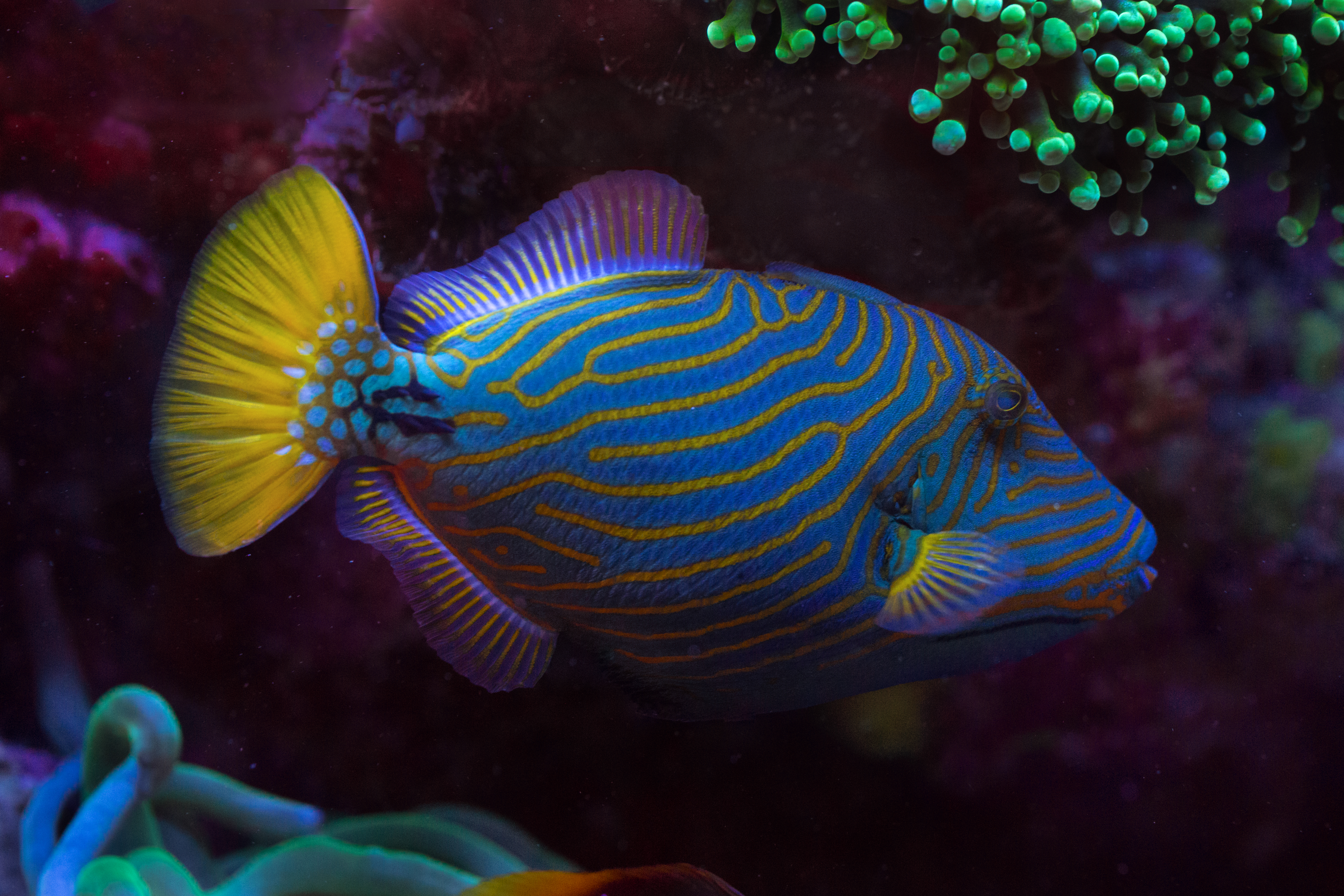
In captivity, by the Red Sea

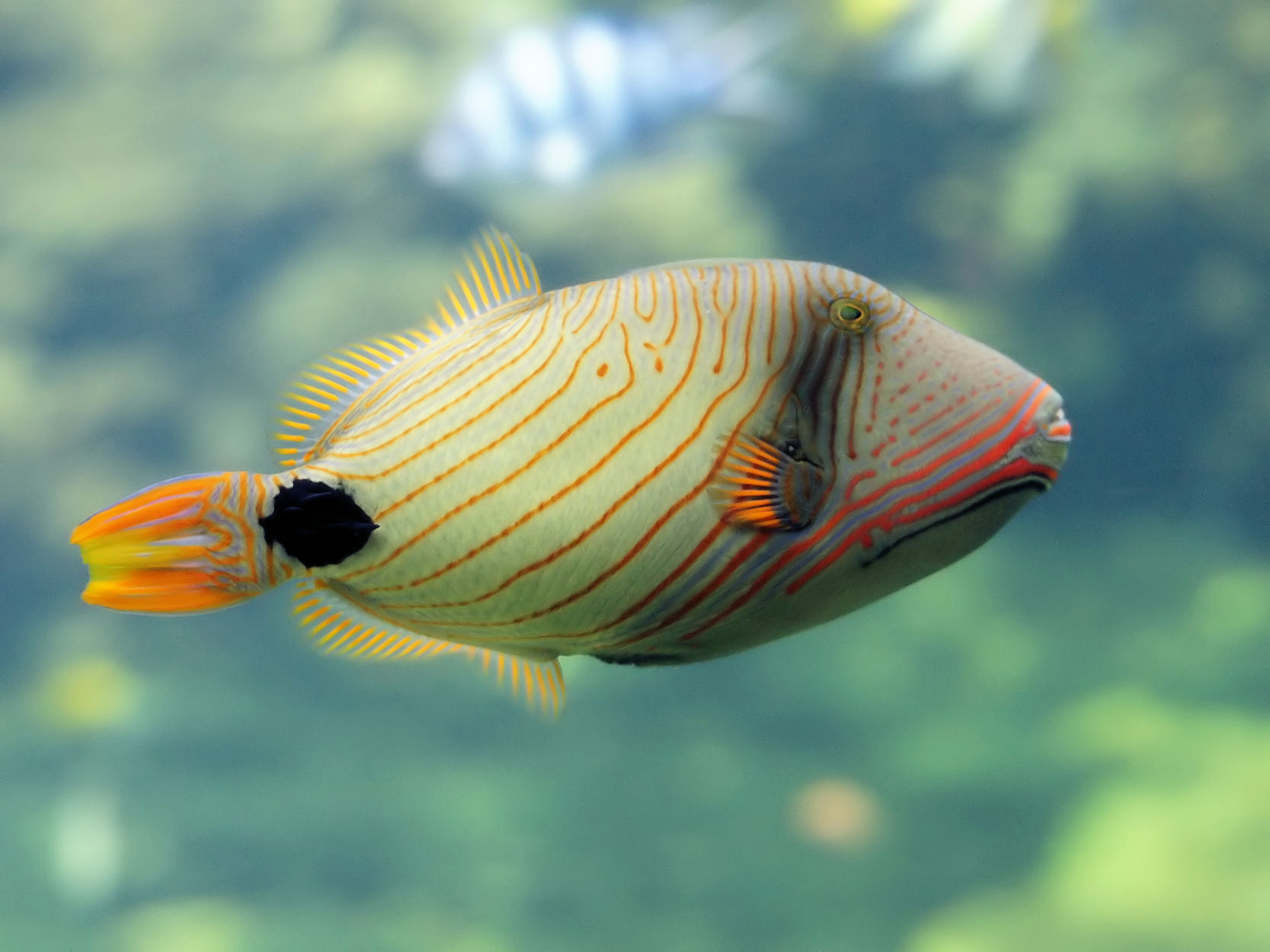
In captivity, France

Philippines

Philippines

Réunion
