= Taos =

Taos or TAOS may refer to:

== Places ==
- Taos County, New Mexico, United States
  - Taos, New Mexico, a city, the county seat of Taos County, New Mexico
    - Taos art colony, an art colony founded in Taos, New Mexico
  - Taos Pueblo, a Native American pueblo
  - Taos Pueblo, New Mexico, a census-designated place in Taos County, New Mexico
  - Taos Ski Valley, New Mexico, a ski resort village in New Mexico
- Taos, Missouri, a city in Cole County, Missouri, United States

== People and language ==
- Taos people, or the Tiwa people
  - Taos language, a Tanoan language spoken in Taos Pueblo, New Mexico
  - The subset of Puebloan peoples who speak the Taos language

== Other ==
- Taiwanese–American Occultation Survey (TAOS)
- Taos, a sleeping car built by the Budd Company in 1938 for use on the Atchison, Topeka and Santa Fe Railway's passenger train, the Super Chief
- Taos Hum, a phenomenon involving a persistent and invasive low-frequency noise of a humming character and unknown origin
- Taos Revolt, a popular insurrection against the American occupation of New Mexico in 1847 during the Mexican–American War
- TAOS (operating system), later renamed to Intent.
- Technology for Autonomous Operational Survivability, a United States Air Force satellite
- Texas Advanced Optoelectronic Solutions, a semiconductor light sensor maker now owned by ams AG
- Volkswagen Taos, a sport utility vehicle model

== See also ==
- Tao (disambiguation)
