= Jintao (disambiguation) =

Jintao or Jin-tao or variation, may refer to:

- Chen Jintao (1870–1939), founder of the Bank of China (BOC) and Chief Financial Officer of the Republic of China (ROC)
- He Jintao (died 840), general of the Tang dynasty of China
- Hu Jintao (born 1942), General Secretary of the Chinese Communist Party from 2002 to 2012
- Liao Jintao (born 2000), Chinese soccer player
- Tian Jintao, 21st century Chinese para-ice-hockey player
- Wu Jintao (born 1975), Chinese cross-country skier

== See also ==
- Juntao (disambiguation)
