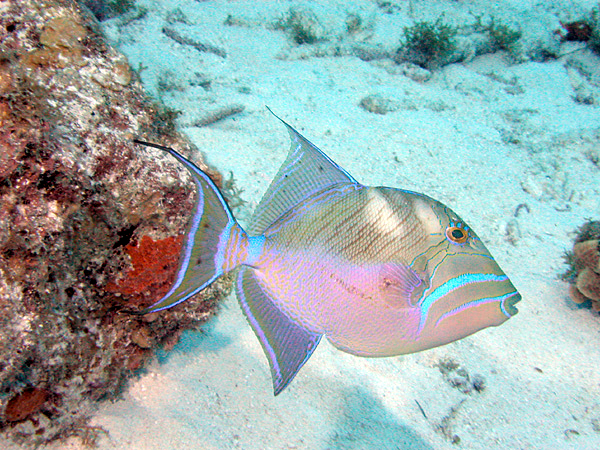

Conservation status
- Near Threatened (IUCN 3.1)

Scientific classification
- Kingdom: Animalia
- Phylum: Chordata
- Class: Actinopterygii
- Division: Teleostei
- Order: Tetraodontiformes
- Family: Balistidae
- Genus: Balistes
- Species: B. vetula

Binomial name
- Balistes vetula Linnaeus, 1758

Synonyms
- Balistes bellus Walbaum, 1792; Balistes pellucidus Hermann, 1804; Balistes equestris Gronow, 1854; Balistes vetula trinitatis Nichols & Murphy, 1914

= Balistes vetula =

Species of fish

The queen triggerfish (Balistes vetula) is a large triggerfish species found in the tropical Atlantic Ocean. Its body coloration ranges from steel grey to olive green, but around the mouth are orange areas with striking electric blue rays. This species is commonly found in coral reefs or rocky bottoms of the sea. Its diet is mainly composed of shelled invertebrates like crabs and sea urchins. When breeding, the queen triggerfish dig a sandpit with its fin to lay eggs and fiercely defend eggs. This species is an important food fish among Caribbean communities, often harvested by hook-and-lines or fish traps.

== Taxonomy ==
Balistes vetula was first formally described in the 10th edition of Systema Naturae published in 1758 with its type locality given as Ascension Island. In 1865 Pieter Bleeker designated this species as the type species of the genus Balistes. Balistes is the type genus of the family Balistidae, which is classified in the suborder Balistoidei in the order Tetraodontiformes.

== Etymology ==
Balistes vetula is the type species of the genus Balistes, a name which refers to the first spine of the dorsal fin being locked in place by the erection of the shorter second trigger spine, and unlocked by depressing the second spine. Balistes is taken directly from the Italian pesca ballista, the "crossbow fish". Ballista originally being a machine for throwing arrows. The specific name vetula means "old woman" or "old wife", the Latin cognate of vieja, a Spanish name used in Cuba for this species which was recorded by the Cuban naturalist Antonio Parra in 1787. This name apparently follows a Portuguese tradition of some larger fishes common names which allude to women. George Shaw said "It is supposed to have obtained the popular title of Old Wife Fish from the appearance of the mouth when viewed in front, as well as from the slightly murmuring noise which it utters when first taken."

== Distribution ==
The queen triggerfish could be found in the Atlantic waters, most commonly in warmer regions. In the Western Atlantic, its range spans from Massachusetts to Brazil, as well as the Caribbean Sea. It's most common in Florida, the Bahamas and the Caribbean. While on the Eastern Atlantic, its range stretches from the Azores to Southern Angola.

== Description ==
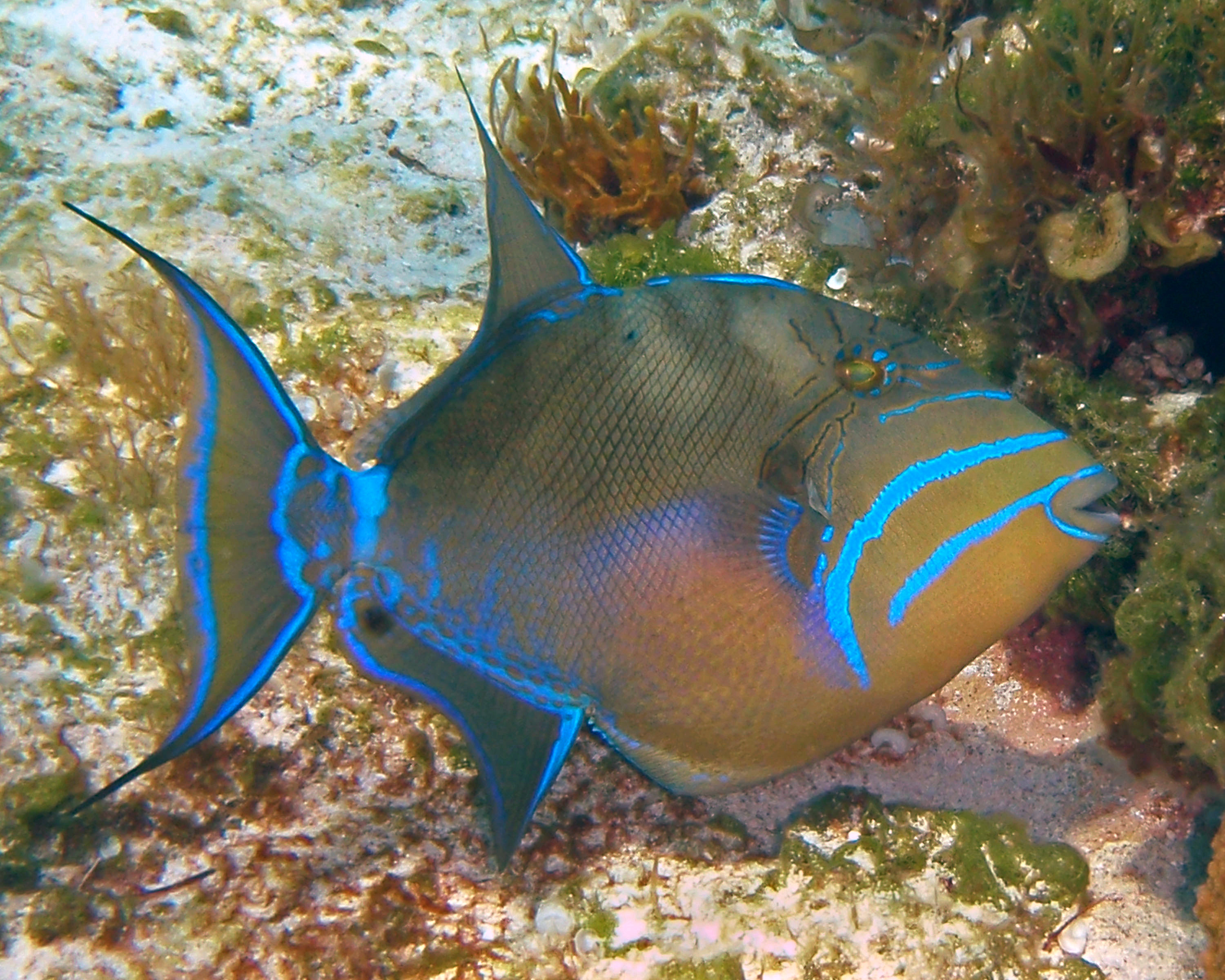
A queen triggerfish found in the Bahamas, its striking electric blue rays around the mouth are clearly visible

Among all triggerfishes, the queen triggerfish is a fairly large species, often reaches a total length of 45 centimeters. The female tends to be larger than male. It is oval-shaped and laterally compressed, with small eyes close to the top of its head. Despite having a small mouth, its jaw is extremely powerful and accompanied by sharp incisors. Compared to other larger triggerfishes with overlapped spread, such as grey triggerfish and ocean triggerfish, the queen triggerfish is easily recognizable with its color patterns. The body is generally steel grey to oval green, with orange parts below its mouth and pectoral fin. There are electric blue rays presented around its mouth, as well as dark blue lines radiating from its eyes. A blue line is visible at the end of the caudal fin. Its first dorsal fin is triangular, with spines to stuck the fish into cervices when resting or escaping from predators. Its second dorsal fin and anal is very long and triangular, while its caudal fin is crescent-shaped. The juvenile queen triggerfish has almost identical appearance, but is duller compared to an adult. It can change colour somewhat to match its surroundings, or if subjected to stress.

== Ecology ==
At Cozumel, Mexico

=== Habitat ===
In Florida, with fully erect dorsal and pelvic spines

The queen triggerfish generally resides in rocky seabed or coral reefs, but is occasionally found in sandy seabed or seagrass meadows. It could inhabit in water as deep as 275m, but is most commonly found in much shallower water no deeper than 30m.

=== Feeding ===
The queen triggerfish feeds on a variety of prey items, mainly on sea urchins, crabs and chitons, but also occasionally preys on shrimps, snails, bivalves, small fishes and brittle stars. When feeding, it generally repeatedly bites the victim in order to crush its shell or detach it from the reef by sharp incisors. In this process, the queen triggerfish may swallow the prey and immediately spit it out. Purposes of such behavior include to repositioning the prey for further bites or removing inedible parts. However, in occasions that it is foraging a more agile and fast-swimming prey, it would simply suck the prey into its mouth.

=== Life cycle ===
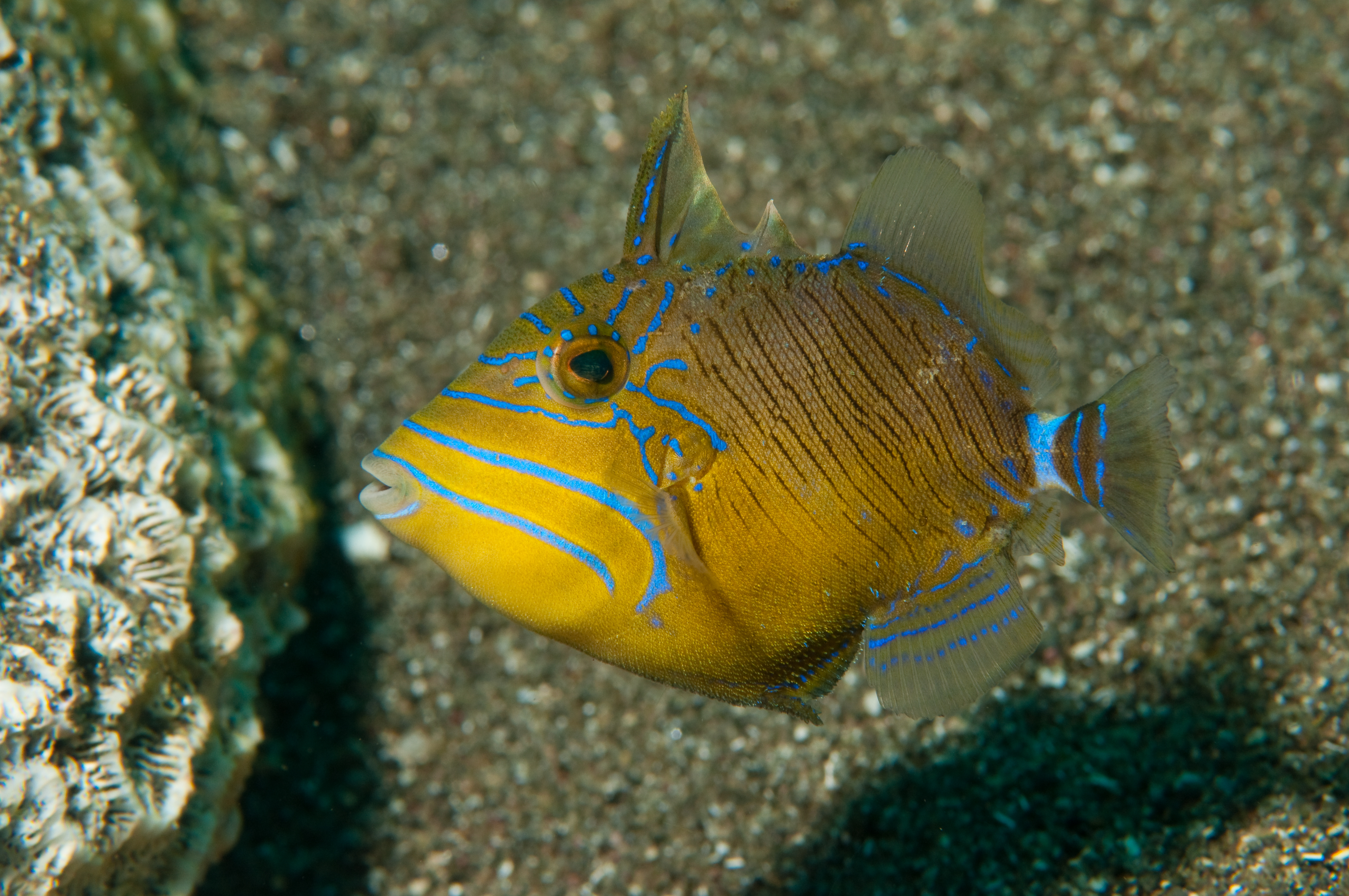
Juvenile

The queen triggerfish breeds throughout the year. Larger females are thought to be capable of releasing eggs more than 80 times a year. Most breedings occur around the full moon. It often migrates to a certain breeding ground for mating. When breeding, it digs a shallow sand pit on seabed with its fin and lays eggs inside. After that, parent fishes would intensively take care of eggs and become extremely aggressive and territorial. It may use a membrane below its pectoral fins to make noise alerting other animals to stay away. After hatching, larvae are often drifted away by ocean currents. On average, male reaches maturity when 2.7 years old, while female reaches maturity at 4 years old. The maximum lifespan of the queen triggerfish is still debated. An otolith study from 1980s claimed that it could only live for 7 years, while a later study of its growth pattern reports a lifespan of 14 years. Analysis of bomb radiocarbon proposes a much longer lifespan of 40 years at maximum.

=== Predators & parasites ===
In natural environment, main predators of queen triggerfishes are larger piscivorous reef fishes, such as jacks, groupers and sharks. It is the host of whole variety of parasites including several species of copepods, isopods, leeches, tapeworms, flukes and nematodes.

== Relationship to humans ==
=== Interaction with divers ===
Generally speaking, the queen triggerfish is shy toward divers and often swim away when approached. Occasionally, it may show curiosity and swim around divers. However, it is incredibly aggressive when guarding eggs and could perform a nasty bite to divers if harassed.

=== As aquarium fish ===
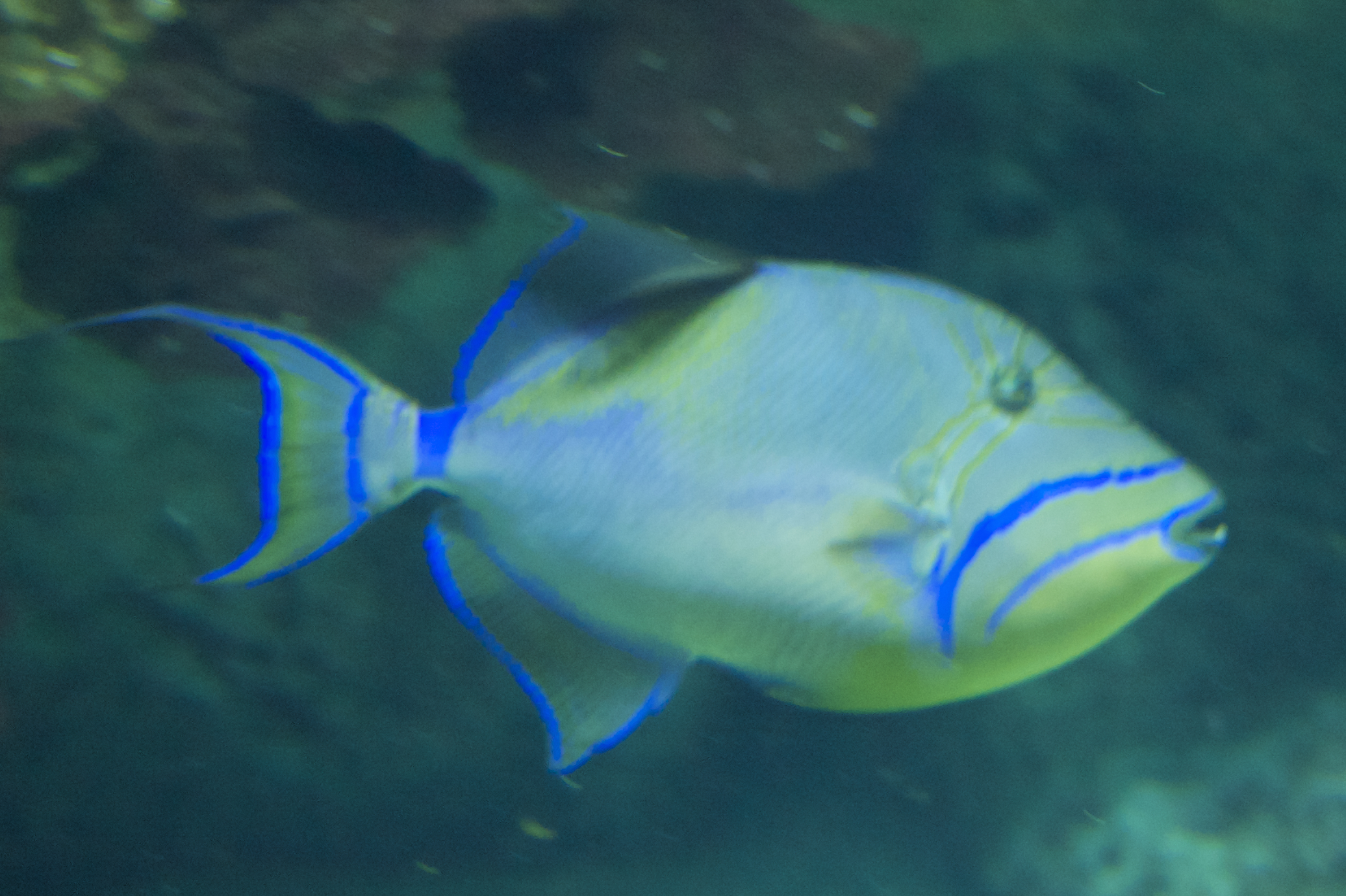
A queen triggerfish kept in National Aquarium in Baltimore

Due to its striking color, the queen triggerfish may be kept in an aquarium. Most individuals sold on market were captured from wild population in the Caribbeans. However, due to its large size and territoriality, it requires a very large tank so is rarely placed in private aquariums.

=== As food ===
The queen triggerfish is a staple food fish for many Latin American communities on the coast of the Caribbean Sea, often harvested by hook-and-line or fish traps. Also, it is commonly found as bycatch of commercial longline fisheries. However, this fish may contain Ciguatoxin.

=== Conservation ===
Populations of queen triggerfish in the U.S. water and the Caribbean Sea are overall healthy. In addition to that, Puerto Rico and U.S. Virgin Islands have protected its breeding grounds as no-take zones. However, its population in Brazilian water and the Gulf of Guinea has suffered disastrous decline, losing more than 90% of individuals since 1980s, primarily due to overfishing.
