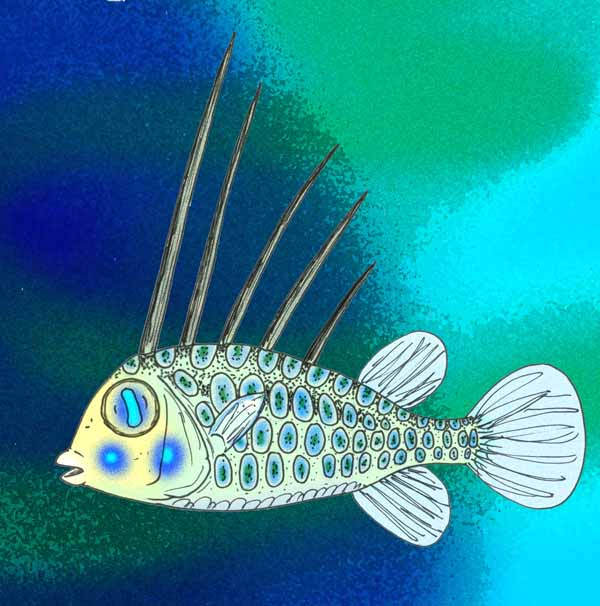
- Artist's reconstruction

Scientific classification
- Kingdom: Animalia
- Phylum: Chordata
- Class: Actinopterygii
- Order: Tetraodontiformes
- Family: †Spinacanthidae
- Genus: †Spinacanthus; Agassiz, 1835
- Species: †S. blennioides

Binomial name
- †Spinacanthus blennioides (Agassiz, 1835)

= Spinacanthus =

Spinacanthus Temporal range: Early- Middle Eocene

Species of fish

Spinacanthus cuneiformis is an extinct prehistoric tetraodontid bony fish that lived from the Lutetian epoch of Eocene Monte Bolca.

In life, it would have resembled a somewhat-flattened boxfish with five long spines along the anterior-dorsal side, with the longest spine directly above the forehead, and the shortest spine directly in front of the dorsal fin. It is distinguished from its close, sympatric relative, Protobalistum, in that its individual scales are relatively small, and do not touch each other. (In Protobalistum, the scales are large, and form a sort of armor).

S. cuneiformis and Protobalistum were a part of the ecosystem of the lagoon that became Monte Bolca. Because of their similarity to boxfish, and due to their close relation to modern-day triggerfish, spinacanthids may have preyed on shellfish and small fish.

== See also ==
- Prehistoric fish
- List of prehistoric bony fish
- Protobalistum, its closest relative
- Eospinus, another close relative from the Earliest Eocene of Turkmenistan
- Eolactoria, another extinct tetraodontid from Monte Bolca
- Proaracana, another extinct tetraodontid from Monte Bolca
