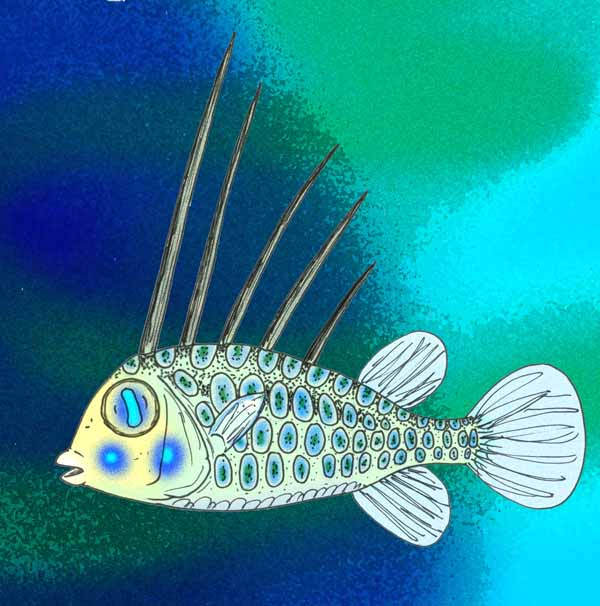
- Spinacanthus
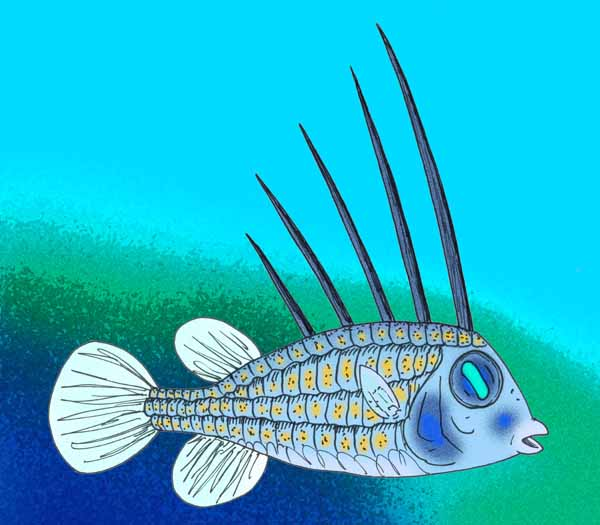
- Protobalistum

Scientific classification
- Kingdom: Animalia
- Phylum: Chordata
- Class: Actinopterygii
- Division: Teleostei
- Order: Tetraodontiformes
- Superfamily: Ostracioidea
- Family: †Spinacanthidae

Genera
- Spinacanthus; Protobalistum

= Spinacanthidae =

Spinacanthidae Temporal range: Early- Middle Eocene

Extinct family of fishes

Spinacanthidae is an extinct prehistoric family of tetraodontid bony fish that lived from the Lutetian epoch of Eocene Monte Bolca.

In life, either genus would have resembled a somewhat-flattened boxfish with five massive spines along the anterior-dorsal side, with the longest spine directly above the forehead, and the shortest spine directly in front of the dorsal fin. Protobalistum is distinguished from its close, sympatric relative, Spinacanthus, in that its scales are large, and form a sort of armor. In Spinacanthus, the individual scales are relatively small, and do not touch each other.

Protobalistum and Spinacanthus were a part of the ecosystem of the lagoon that became Monte Bolca. Because of their similarity to boxfish, and due to their close relation to modern-day triggerfish, spinacanthids may have preyed on shellfish and small fish.

== See also ==
- Eospinus, another close relative from the Earliest Eocene of Turkmenistan
- Eolactoria, another extinct tetraodontid from Monte Bolca
- Proaracana, another extinct tetraodontid from Monte Bolca
- Prehistoric fish
- List of prehistoric bony fish
