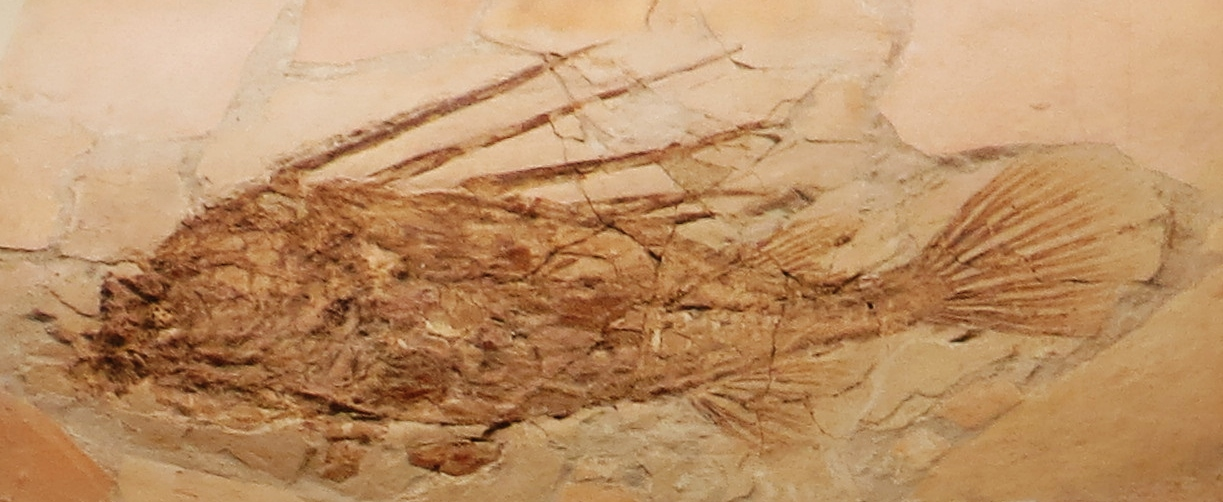

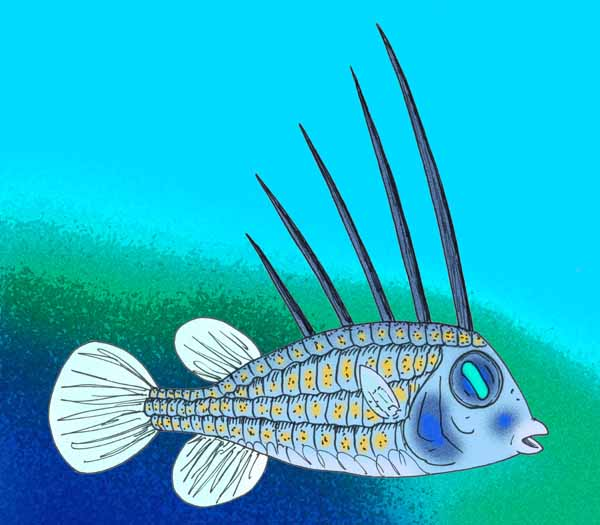
- Artist's reconstruction

Scientific classification
- Domain: Eukaryota
- Kingdom: Animalia
- Phylum: Chordata
- Class: Actinopterygii
- Order: Tetraodontiformes
- Family: †Spinacanthidae
- Genus: †Protobalistum; Massalongo, 1857

Type species
- †Protobalistum imperiale

= Protobalistum =

Protobalistum Temporal range: Early- Middle Eocene

Extinct genus of fishes

Protobalistum imperiale is an extinct prehistoric tetraodontid bony fish that lived from the Lutetian epoch of Eocene Monte Bolca.

In life, it would have resembled a compressed boxfish with five massive spines along the anterior-dorsal side, with the longest spine directly above the forehead, and the shortest spine directly in front of the dorsal fin. It is distinguished from its close, sympatric relative, Spinacanthus, in that its scales are large, and form a sort of armor. (In S. cuneiformis, the individual scales are relatively small, and do not touch each other).

Protobalistum imperiale and Spinacanthus were a part of the ecosystem of the lagoon that would become Monte Bolca. It has been suggested that, because of their similarity to boxfish, and due to their close relation to modern-day triggerfish, spinacanthids may have preyed on shellfish and small fish.

== See also ==
- Spinacanthus, its closest relative, lived sympatrically with Protobalistum
- Eospinus, another close relative from the Earliest Eocene of Turkmenistan
- Eolactoria, another extinct tetraodontid from Monte Bolca
- Proaracana, another extinct tetraodontid from Monte Bolca
- Prehistoric fish
- List of prehistoric bony fish
