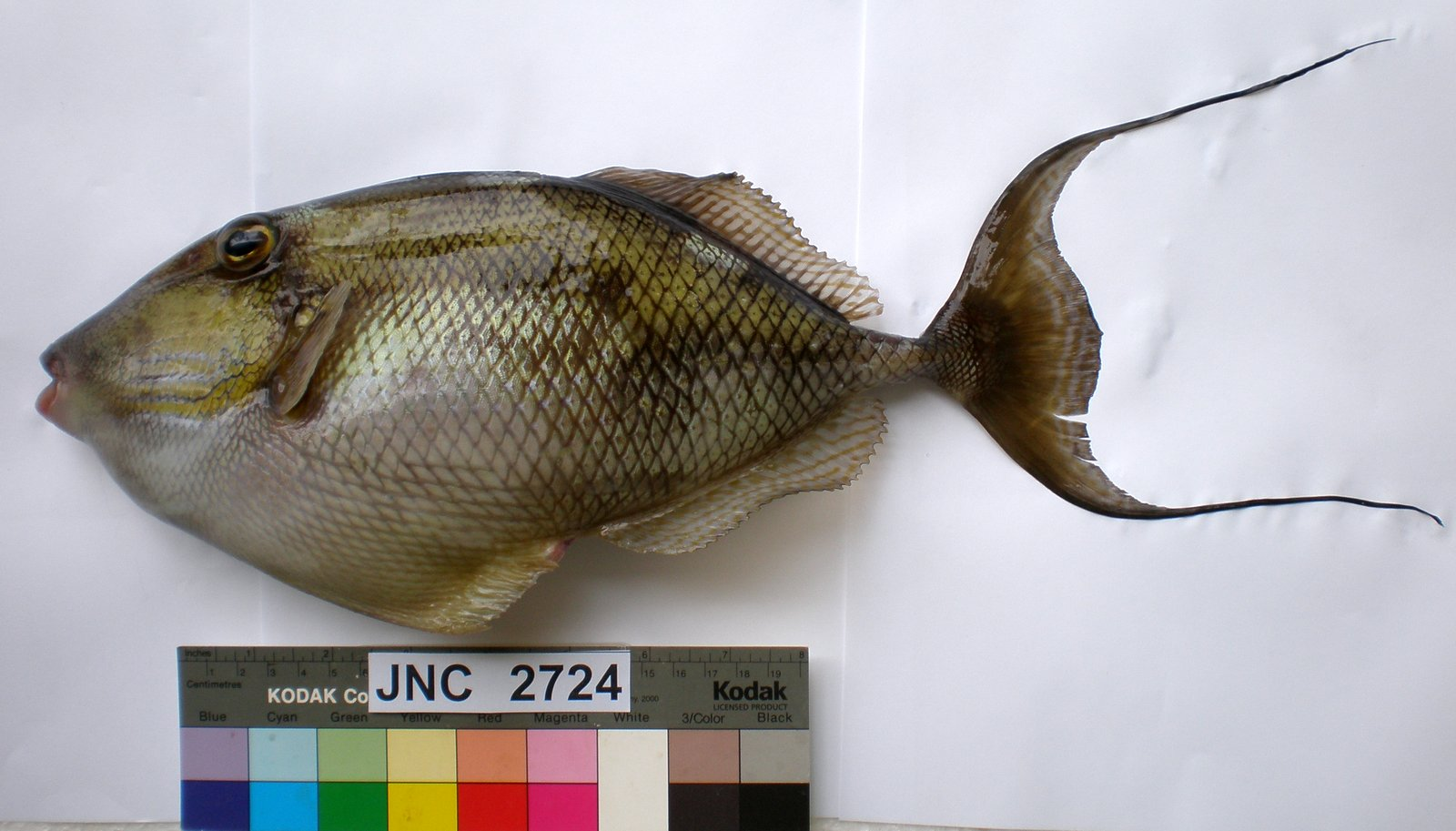

Conservation status
- Least Concern (IUCN 3.1)

Scientific classification
- Kingdom: Animalia
- Phylum: Chordata
- Class: Actinopterygii
- Division: Teleostei
- Order: Tetraodontiformes
- Family: Balistidae
- Genus: Abalistes
- Species: A. filamentosus

Binomial name
- Abalistes filamentosus Matsuura & Yoshino, 2004

= Abalistes filamentosus =

Species of fish

Abalistes filamentosus, the hairfin triggerfish, is a species of marine ray-finned fish belonging to the family Balistidae, the triggerfishes. It is found in the Indo-Pacific Ocean and in subtropical waters. It lives in the Pelagic-Neritic zone of the ocean between 61–180 meters deep. It is harmless to humans.

== Taxonomy ==
Abalistes filamentosus was first formally described in 2004 by the Japanese ichthyologists Keiichi Matsuura and Tetsuo Yoshino with its type locality given as off Itoman on the south coast of Okinawa-jima Island in the Ryukyu Islands. This species belongs to the family Blaistidae, which is included in the suborder Balistoidei within the order Tetraodontiformes.

== Etymology ==
Abalistes filamentosus is classified within the genus Abalistes, a name which prefixes a-, meaning "not", with Balistes, the genus that A. stellaris, a synonym of A. stellatus, was considered to belong to. The specific name, filamentosus, means "filamentous", an allusion to uppermost and lowermost rays of the caudal fin being highly elongated into filaments.

== Distribution ==
Abalistes filamentosus is found in the marine and subtropical waters of the Indo-Pacific, especially in the range of the Ryukyu Islands to the North West Shelf of Australia, and the Timor Sea. It was also reported in New Caledonia.

== Description ==
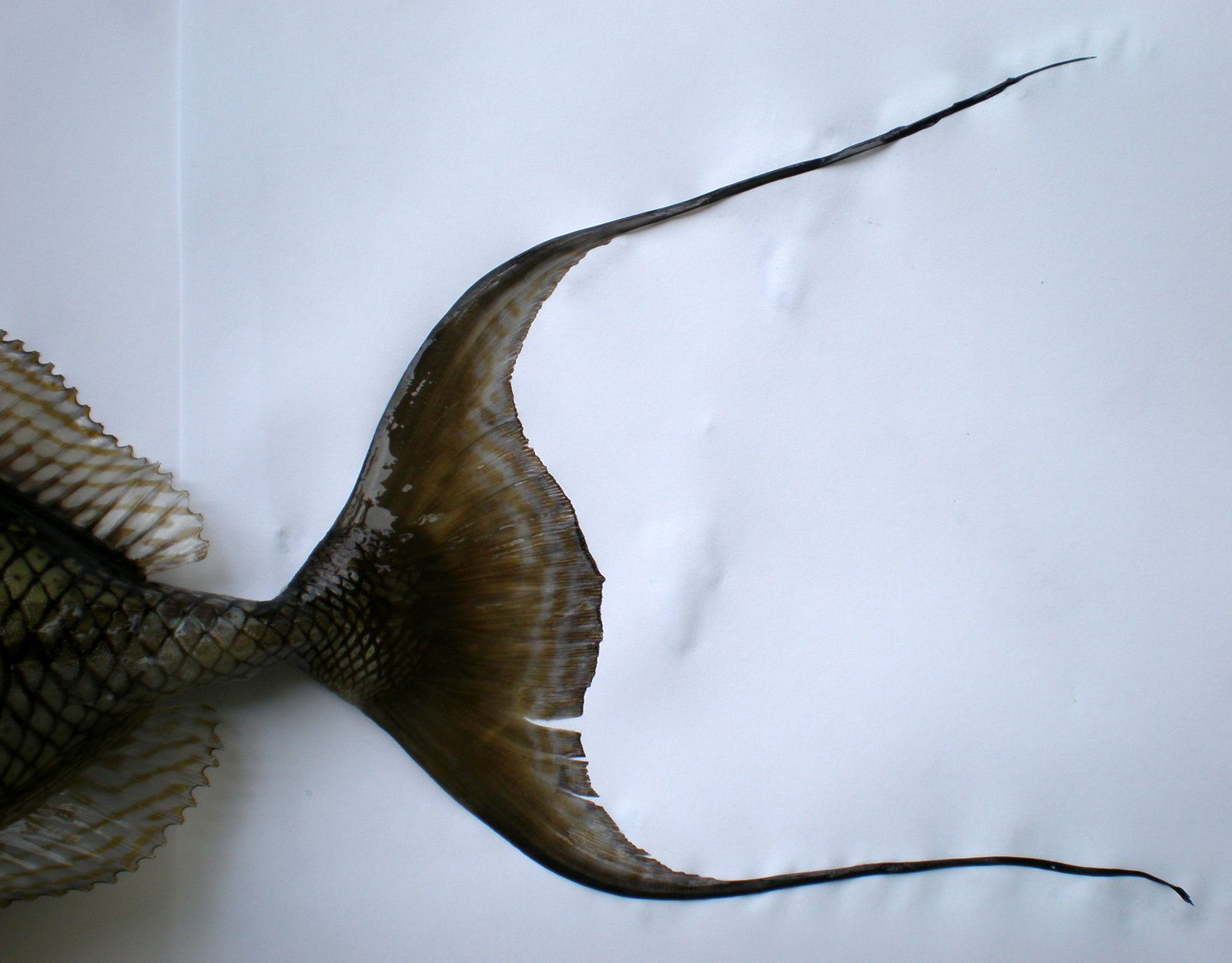
The tail and its characteristic filaments

Abalistes filamentosus has a total of three dorsal spines, 25-27 dorsal soft rays, 22-25 anal soft rays, and 14-15 pectoral rays. The upper and lower rays of the caudal fin are formed from filaments. The spinal dorsal fin is dark brown, and the body has now yellow or light blue spots. The dark brown color gradually becomes white ventrally, and its cheek is brown with a tint of green. Its cross section is compressed and lateral lines are not interrupted.

== Parasites ==
Abalistes filamentosus is a common host to ectoparasites, especially to copepods in the genus Hatschekia in the Ryukyu Island area.
