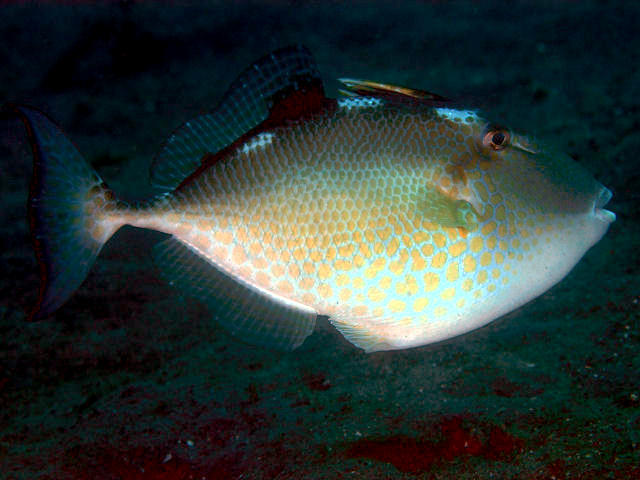
- Abalistes stellatus

Scientific classification
- Kingdom: Animalia
- Phylum: Chordata
- Class: Actinopterygii
- Division: Teleostei
- Order: Tetraodontiformes
- Family: Balistidae
- Genus: Abalistes; D. S. Jordan & Seale, 1906

Type species
- Leiurus macrophthalmus Swainson, 1839

Synonyms
- Leiurus Swainson, 1839

= Abalistes =

Genus of fishes

Abalistes is a small genus of marine ray-finned fishes belonging to the family Balistidae, the triggerfishes. These triggerfishes are found in the Indo-Pacific and eastern Atlantic. This genus contains two recognised species.

== Taxonomy ==
Abalistes was first proposed as a genus in 1906 by the American ichthyologists David Starr Jordan and Alvin Seale with Leiurus macrophthalmus the type species. L. macropthalmus was originally described by William Swainson with Leiurus being proposed as a subgenus of Capriscus, i.e. Balistes, but he used the same name in the same book for a subgenus of the stickleback genus Gasterosteus, meaning that it was unavailable for the triggerfish. This genus belongs to the family Balistidae which is classified within the suborder Balistoidei.

== Etymology ==
Abalistes prefixes a-, meaning "not", with Balistes, the genus that A. stellaris, a synonym of A. stellatus, was considered to belong to.

== Species ==
There are currently two recognised species in this genus:

Image	Species	Common name
	Abalistes filamentosus Matsuura & Yoshino, 2004	Hairfin triggerfish
	Abalistes stellatus Anonymous, referred to Lacépède, 1798	Starry triggerfish

== Characteristics ==
Abalistes triggerfishes are distinguished from the other triggerfish genera by the morphology of the caudal peduncle which is wider than it is deep, i.e. depressed rather than compressed. They have a terminal mouth with uneven notched teeth. The largest of the two species in the genus is the starry triggerfish (A. stellatus) which has a maximum published total length of 60 cm (24 in), A. filamentosus is much smaller with a maximum published standard length of 32.5 cm (12.8 in).

== Distribution ==
Abalistes triggerfishes are found in the Indo-Pacific from the Red Sea and the eastern coast of Africa east through the Indian Ocean and into the Pacific Ocean north to southern Japan, south to Australia and east to Fiji.
