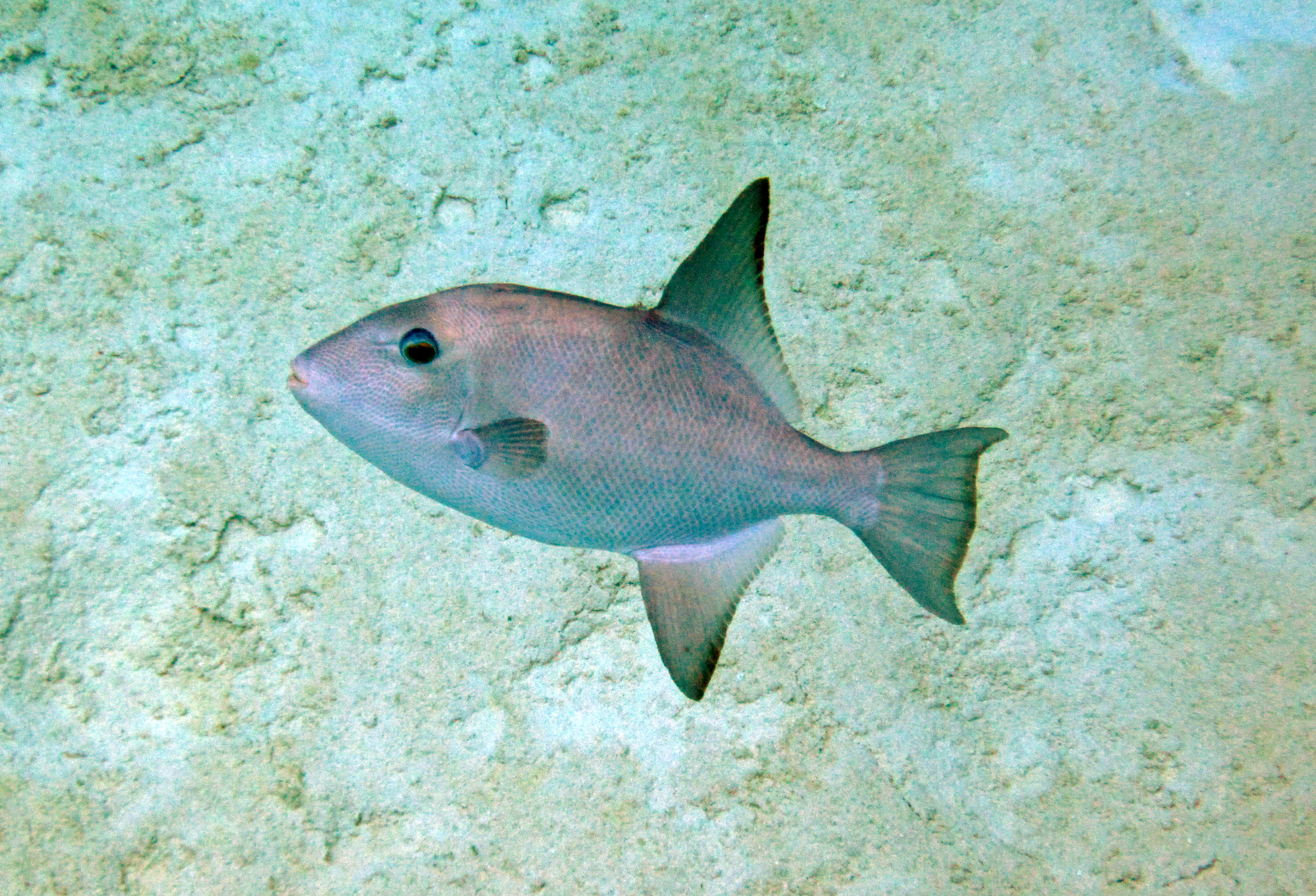

Conservation status
- Least Concern (IUCN 3.1)

Scientific classification
- Kingdom: Animalia
- Phylum: Chordata
- Class: Actinopterygii
- Division: Teleostei
- Order: Tetraodontiformes
- Family: Balistidae
- Genus: Canthidermis
- Species: C. sufflamen

Binomial name
- Canthidermis sufflamen Mitchill, 1815

= Canthidermis sufflamen =

Species of triggerfish

Canthidermis sufflamen, the ocean triggerfish, is a species of pelagic triggerfish that can be found throughout the western Atlantic Ocean and Gulf of Mexico, with its range extending as far north as Massachusetts and as far south as Brazil.

Canthidermis sufflamen is gray in color, oval-shaped, and can often be distinguished from the similar-appearing gray triggerfish (Balistes capriscus) by the presence of a black blotch at the base of each pectoral fin.

== Distribution and habitat ==
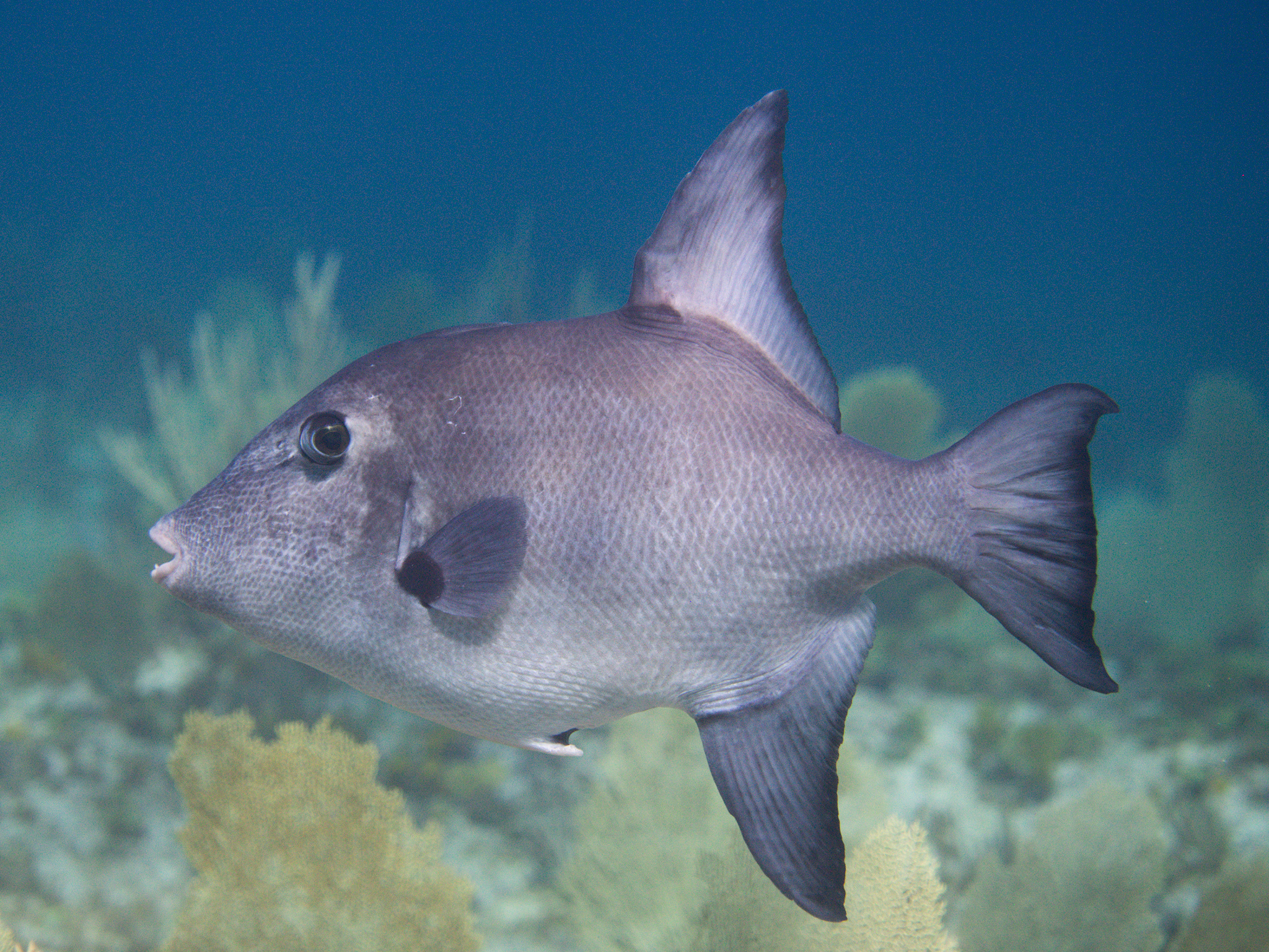
In the Cayman Islands

The ocean triggerfish has a wide range and is considered a common to uncommon inhabitant of waters off of Florida, the Bahamas, and the Caribbean islands. Its range extends as far north as Massachusetts, as far south as Brazil, westward to the Gulf of Mexico, and eastward to Bermuda and the Portuguese island of Madeira.

These fish are usually found in open water, far above coral reefs and often near sharp drop-offs. The females lay eggs in sandy areas and remain near their nests to defend them against predators.

== Description ==
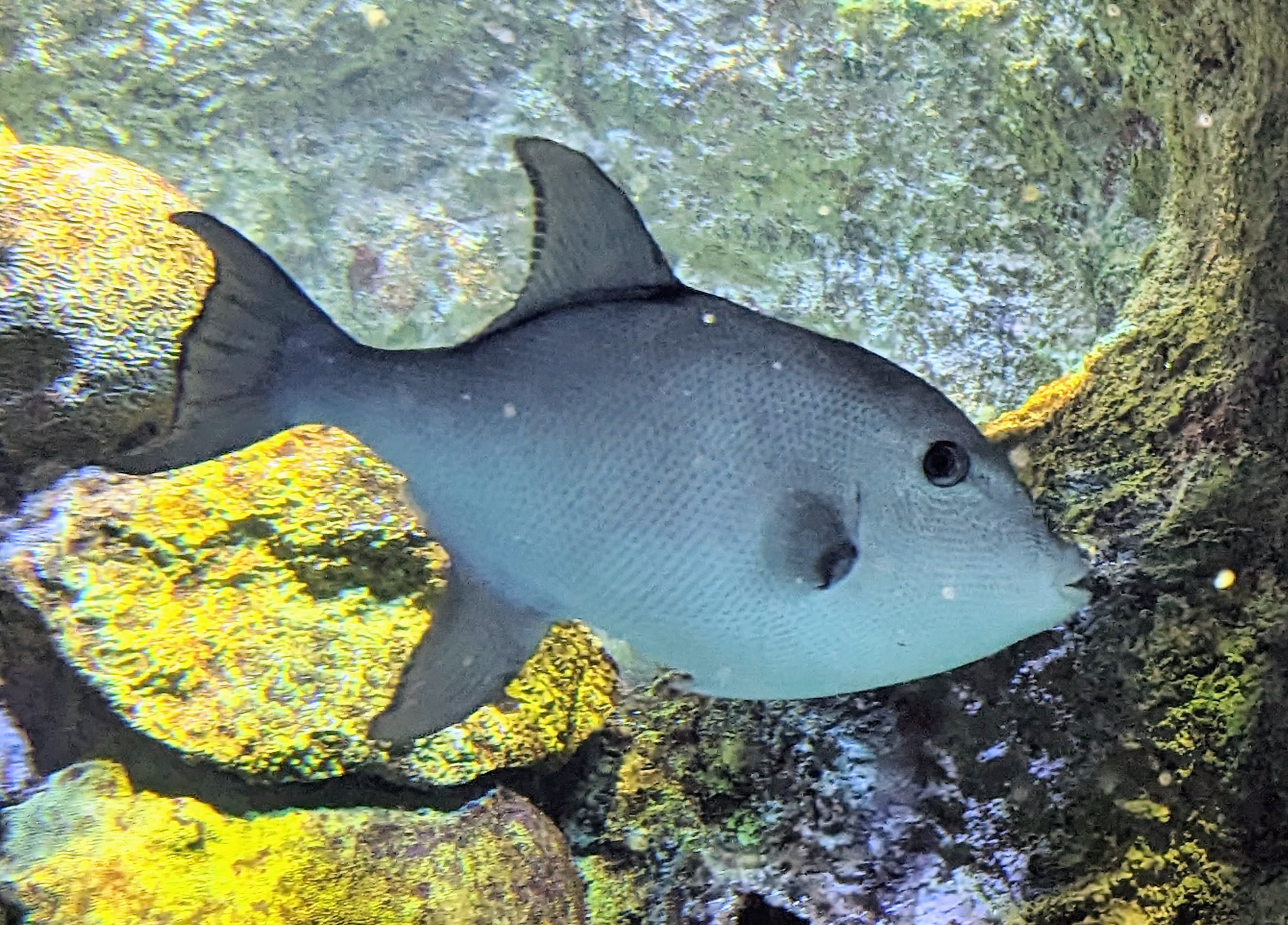
At the New England Aquarium. Note the distinguishing black mark at the base of the pectoral fin.

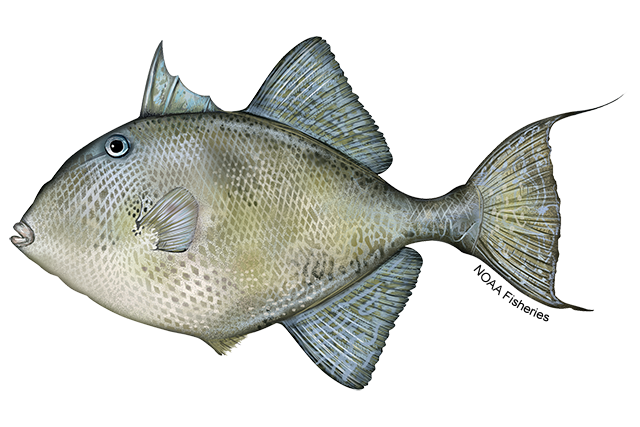
The gray triggerfish, Balistes capriscus, is similar in color to the ocean triggerfish but lacks a characteristic black marking at the base of its pectoral fins.

The species was first described by Samuel L. Mitchill, M.D. in Transactions of the Literary and Philosophical Society of New York (1815) as the "trigger file-fish," Balistes sufflamen. The fish is dove- or ash-colored with a body fourteen inches long and five inches deep, excluding the dorsal fin, which can be collapsed into a furrow along the spine. The three spines on the first dorsal fin resemble the lock of a gun, with the rostral spine being the gun cock, and the caudal spine being the trigger. Canthidermis sufflamen has large, light brown eyes and frequently has darker colored areas at the bases of the pectoral fins and between the dorsal and anal fins. The darkness of the spot at the base of the pectoral fin has been noted to vary in individuals from different geographic regions.

According to meristic data in a 2003 NOAA Technical Memorandum, the ocean triggerfish has seven precaudal and eleven caudal vertebrae, for a total vertebral count of eighteen. The first dorsal fin has three spines, the second dorsal fin has between 25 and 28 rays (mode: 27), the anal fin has between 23 and 25 rays (mode: 24), the pectoral fins have either fifteen or sixteen rays each (mode: 15), and the caudal fin has twelve rays. The pelvic fin in this species is rudimentary and has been reduced to a single rayless tubercle.

== Ecology ==
=== Diet ===
The diet of the ocean triggerfish is composed of a wide variety of invertebrates, including soft corals, hydroids, zooplankton, small shrimp and crabs, benthic gastropods and bivalves, pelagic jellyfish, sea stars, sea cucumbers, and sea urchins.

=== Predation ===
This species is considered extremely useful for ecosystem management in the Canary Islands because it preys on sea urchins (Diadema aff. antillarum) that can otherwise alter benthic communities in this region.

== Importance to humans ==
The ocean triggerfish is a common food species in several areas, including the Caribbean and the island of Madeira. It is not commonly targeted by fisheries in the Western Atlantic. The abundance of this species varies from year to year in the Canary Islands, with some fisheries reporting more than 300 kg caught in a single day.

== Development ==
=== Breeding and nesting ===
Female ocean triggers are oviparous; males typically form a harem with up to six females, then use their fins to fan shallow nests into sandy areas. The females lay their eggs in these nests, and the males visit each nest to fertilize the eggs. The females remain close to the nest to guard the eggs and young fry, and the males remain within a wider proximity to ward off predatory animals. The species is not commonly studied; consequently, their behavioral and lifestyle patterns are poorly documented.

=== Conservation status ===
The conservation status of Canthidermis sufflamen was last assessed by IUCN in June 2011. The global population is considered stable, and the species was given an LC ("least concern") designation.
