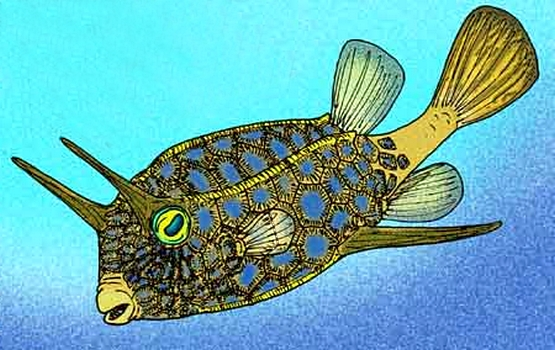
- Artist's reconstruction

Scientific classification
- Kingdom: Animalia
- Phylum: Chordata
- Class: Actinopterygii
- Order: Tetraodontiformes
- Family: Ostraciidae
- Genus: †Oligolactoria; Tyler & Gregorova, 1991
- Species: †O. bubiki

Binomial name
- †Oligolactoria bubiki Tyler & Gregorova, 1991

= Oligolactoria =

Oligolactoria Temporal range: Early Oligocene

Extinct genus of cowfish

Oligolactoria is an extinct genus of boxfish that lived during the Rupelian epoch of the Middle Oligocene in Moravia, Czech Republic. The genus contains only one species, Oligolactoria bubiki. It strongly resembles modern cowfish of the genus Lactoria.

The genus name Oligolactoria is derived from “Oligo” from the Oligocene epoch and “lactoria” in reference to its resemblance to the modern genus Lactoria. The species name “bubiki” is in honor of Mr. Miroslav Bubik, the person who is responsible for collecting most of the type specimens of Oligolactoria and many other fossil material from the Menilitic Formation.

== See also ==
- Eolactoria
- Prehistoric fish
- List of prehistoric bony fish
