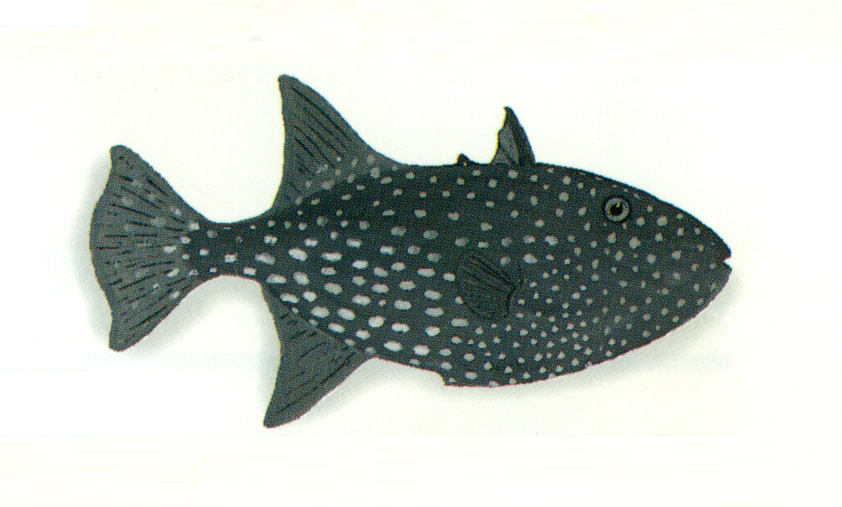
- Canthidermis maculata

Scientific classification
- Kingdom: Animalia
- Phylum: Chordata
- Class: Actinopterygii
- Order: Tetraodontiformes
- Family: Balistidae
- Genus: Canthidermis; Swainson, 1839

= Canthidermis =

Genus of fishes

Canthidermis is a genus of triggerfishes commonly known as ocean triggerfishes.

== Species ==
There are currently 3 recognized species in this genus:

- Canthidermis macrolepis Boulenger, 1888 (Large-scale triggerfish)
- Canthidermis maculata Bloch, 1786 (Spotted oceanic triggerfish)
- Canthidermis sufflamen Mitchill, 1815 (Ocean Triggerfish)

== Description ==
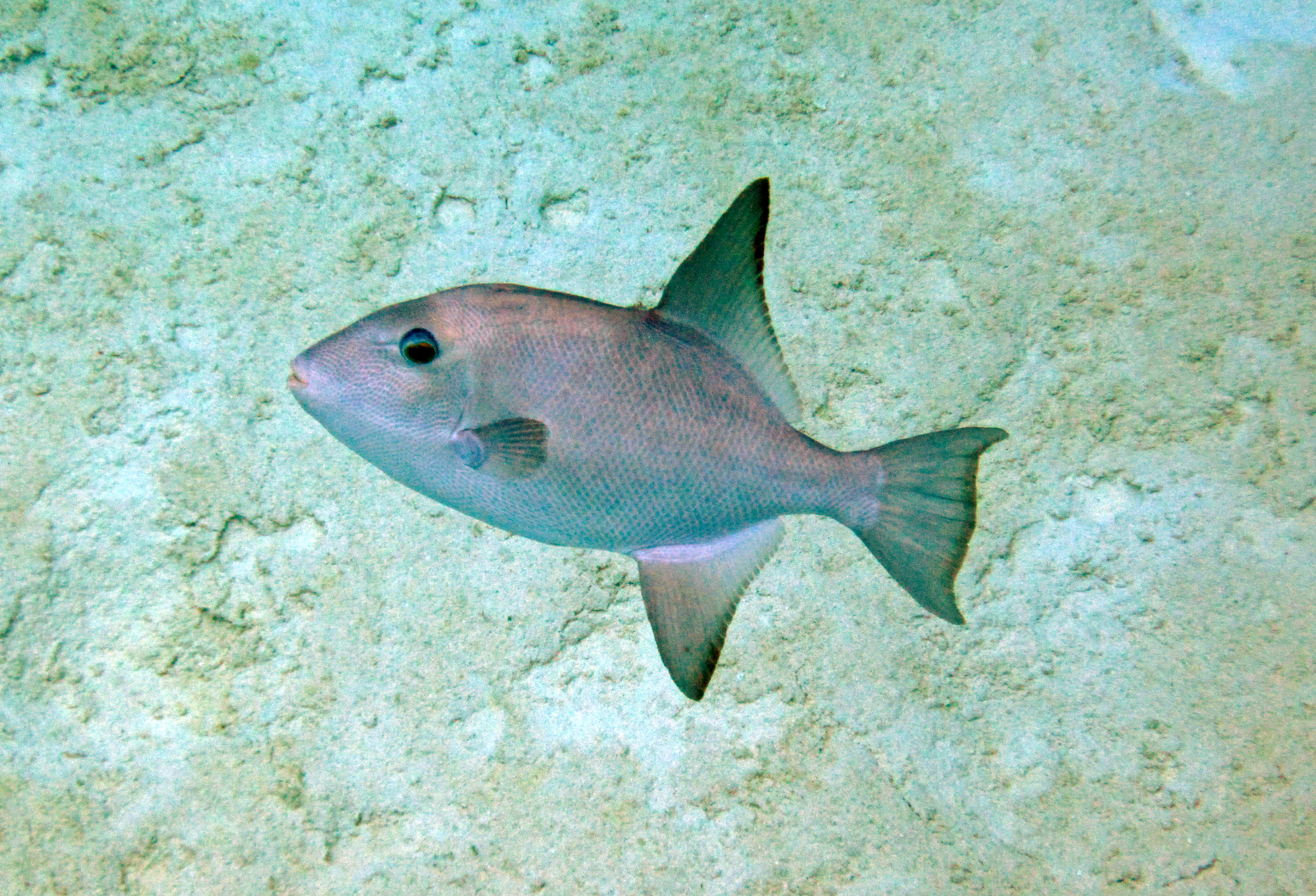
C. sufflamen (ocean triggerfish)

These dark-colored triggerfishes are found in all the world's oceans in tropical and subtropical areas. They are absent in the Mediterranean. Unlike most triggerfish they are epipelagic.

They usually live far away from the coast in the microhabitat created by floating objects like trees, or branches, but also plastic wreck remains, ropes and other large flotsam and jetsam items.

There is still little research on the feeding and reproduction habits of these fish. They are rarely part of the catch unless the marine debris around which they live reaches some coastal area.
