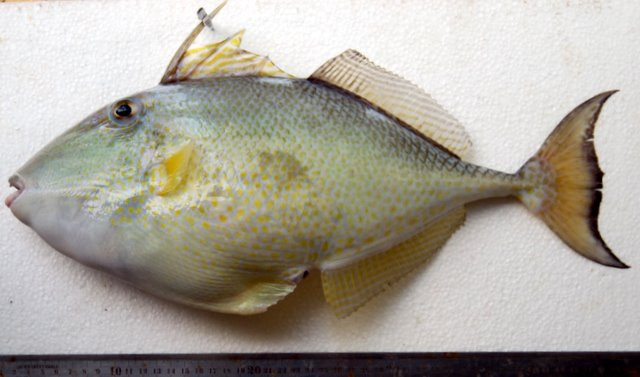

Conservation status
- Least Concern (IUCN 3.1)

Scientific classification
- Kingdom: Animalia
- Phylum: Chordata
- Class: Actinopterygii
- Division: Teleostei
- Order: Tetraodontiformes
- Family: Balistidae
- Genus: Abalistes
- Species: A. stellatus

Binomial name
- Abalistes stellatus (Anonymous in Lacépède, 1798)

Synonyms
- List: Balistes stellatus Anonymous, 1798; Balistes stellaris Bloch & Schneider, 1801; Abalistes stellaris (Bloch & Schneider, 1801); Balistes jellaka Cuvier, 1829; Capriscus (Leiurus) macropthalmus Swainson, 1839; Balistes vachellii Richardson, 1845; Balistes phaleratus Richardson, 1846

= Abalistes stellatus =

Species of fish

Abalistes stellatus, the starry triggerfish or flat-tailed triggerfish, is a species of marine ray-finned fish belonging to the family Balistidae, the triggerfishes. This triggerfish has a wide Indo-Pacific distribution.

== Taxonomy ==
Abalistes stellatus was first formally described in 1798 by an anonymous author, the description being published in Allgemeine Literatur-Zeitung and is the author thought to be Bernard Germain de Lacépède based on a description he found in a manuscript written by Philibert Commerson. The type locality was given as Mauritius. In 1839 William Swainson created a subgenus of Capriscus he called Leiurus but he had already preoccupied this name with a subgenus of sticklebacks and in 1906 David Starr Jordan and Alvin Seale replaced Leiurus with Abalistes, making Capriscus (Leiurus) macropthalmus as its type species by replacement.

== Etymology ==
Abalistes stellatus is the type species of the genus Abalistes, a name which prefixes a-, meaning "not", with Balistes, the genus that A. stellaris, a synonym of A. stellatus, was considered to belong to. The specific name, stellatus, means "starry", a reference to the small white spots on the upper body.

== Distribution and habitat ==
Abalistes stellatus has a wide distribution in the Indian and Western Pacific Oceans. It occurs along the coast of eastern Africa from the Red Sea to Mossel Bay in the Western Cape, South Africa, across the Indian Ocean and into the Western Pacific Ocean as far east as Fiji, north as far as southern Japan and south to northern and eastern Australia. It is found at deptsh between 4 and 120 m (13 and 394 ft) in areas of sand, sponge, and seaweed areas over deep slopes. The juveniles frequently inhabit sheltered coastal bays and estuaries where there are open areas scattered with outcrops of rubble and other debris.

== Description ==
In Queensland

Abalistes stellatus has been recorded growing up to a total length of 60 cm (24 in), although 40 cm (16 in)is more typical. 3 spines and between 25 and 27 soft rays in its dorsal fin while the anal fin has 24 or 24 soft rays. There is an oblique groove in front of the eye and the scales to the rear of the gill slit are large. The depth of the body fits into the standard length between 2 and 2.5 times. The caudal peduncle is flattened and is at least as wide as it is deep, as well as being narrow and tapering with a length much greater than its depth. The caudal fin is double emarginate and the two lobes lengthen as the fish grows. The large scales behind the gill slit and above the base of the pectoral fin create a flexible tympanum. The scales towards the rear of the body are keeled, creating longitudinal ridges.

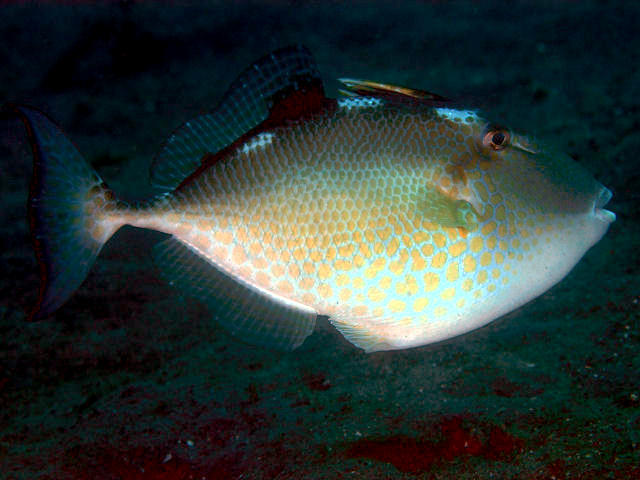
In Japan

The overall colour is greyish to greenish-brown fading to whitish ventrally, there are four large white blotches along the back, the last of these is located on the caudal peduncle and the body is marked with pale yellowish-brown spots and there may be a white streak on the middle of the upper side.

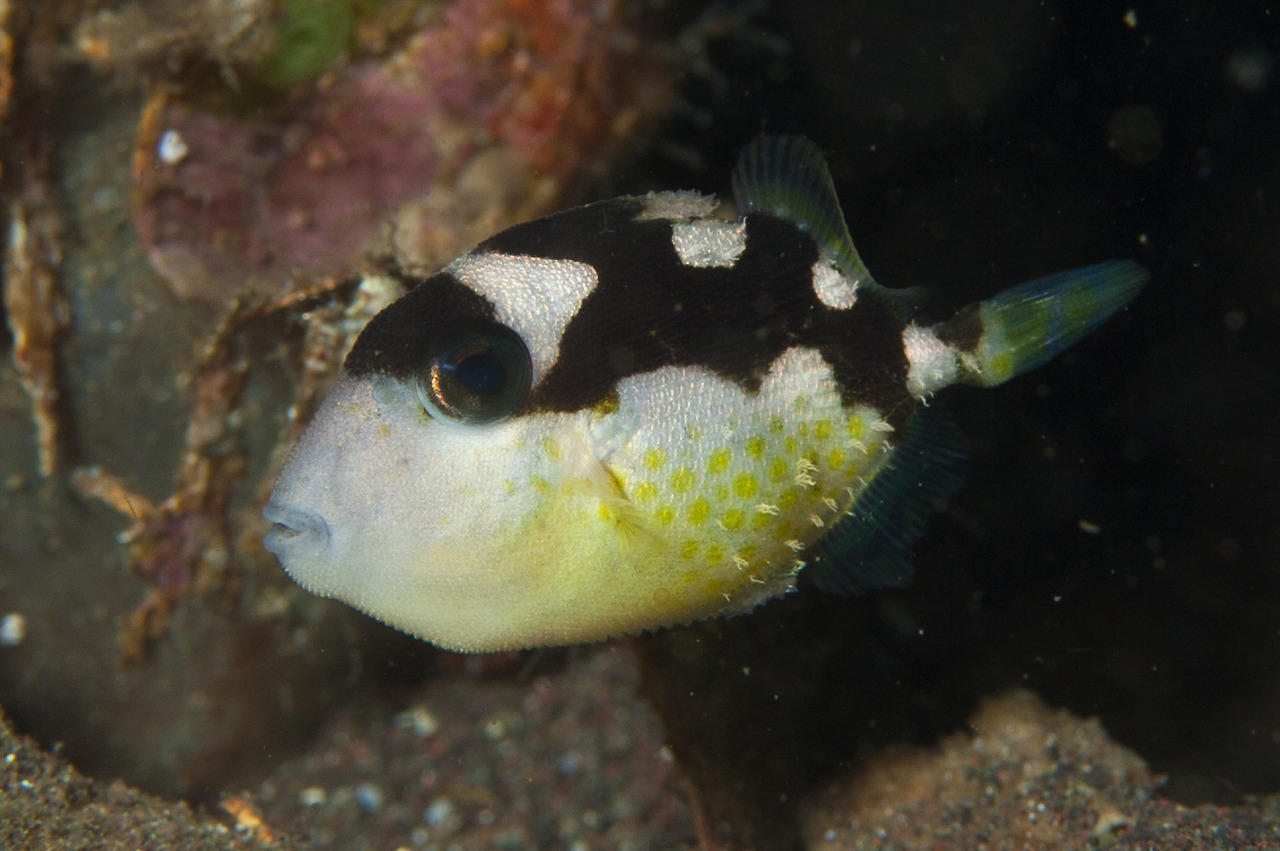
A juvenile Starry Triggerfish, Abalistes stellatus, at Ose, Izu Peninsula, Japan, depth 27 m

== Biology ==
Abalistes setllatus feeds on benthic invertebrates and its diet includes crabs, molluscs and sea urchins. The starry triggerfish is typically solitary but the males and females come together to form pairs for breeding. The eggs are laid on the substrate and are guarded by the female.
