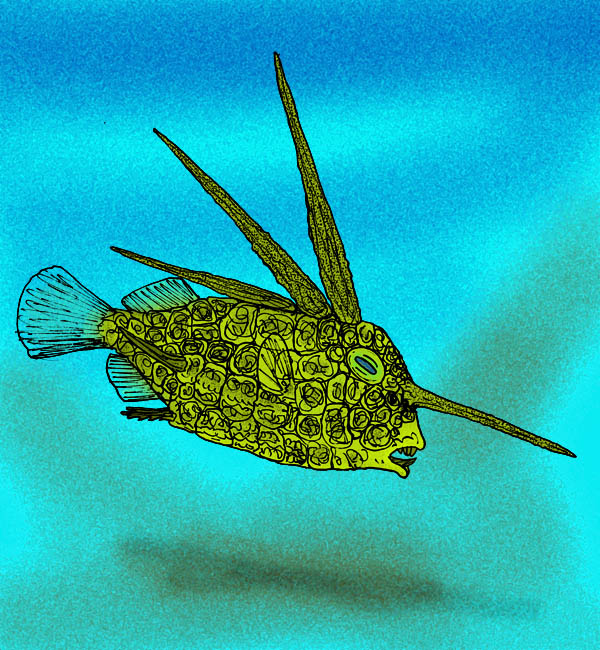
- Life restoration of E. daniltshenkoi

Scientific classification
- Kingdom: Animalia
- Phylum: Chordata
- Class: Actinopterygii
- Order: Tetraodontiformes
- Family: †Bolcabalistidae; Santini & Tyler, 2002
- Genus: †Eospinus; Tyler & Bannikov, 1992
- Species: †E. daniltshenkoi

Binomial name
- †Eospinus daniltshenkoi Tyler & Bannikov, 1992

= Eospinus =

Eospinus Temporal range: Earliest Ypresian

Species of fish

Eospinus ("dawn spine") is an extinct genus of bizarre marine tetraodontiform fish from the Eocene. It is known from the earliest Ypresian-aged Danata Formation lagerstatten of Turkmenistan. The species name honors paleoichthyologist Pavel G. Daniltshenko (also Danilchenko), who described numerous fossil fish from Russia and neighboring countries.

Eospinus had a highly unusual appearance. It had four dorsal spines, three of which were on the anterior end of its dorsal side, and the first spine being placed between and below the eyes, almost like a long nose. It also had a pair of spines near the base of its caudal peduncle, and a spine in front of the anal fin.

In 2002, and confirmed again in 2003, Santini and Tyler erected the family Bolcabalistidae to contain both Eospinus and the genus Bolcabalistes from Monte Bolca as close relatives of both triggerfishes and boxfishes. The similar Moclaybalistes of Ypresian Denmark was originally also placed in Bolcabalistidae, too, in 2002, but then move it into its own monotypic family of Moclaybalistidae.

Eospinus inhabited the northeastern Tethys Ocean. Its morphology suggests a slow-moving benthic lifestyle likely associated with reefs, as with many modern tetraodontiforms.

== See also ==
- List of prehistoric bony fish
- Spinacanthus
- Protobalistum

== Sources ==
- A remarkable new genus of Tetraodontiform fish with features of both Balistids and Ostraciids from the Eocene of Turkmenistan
