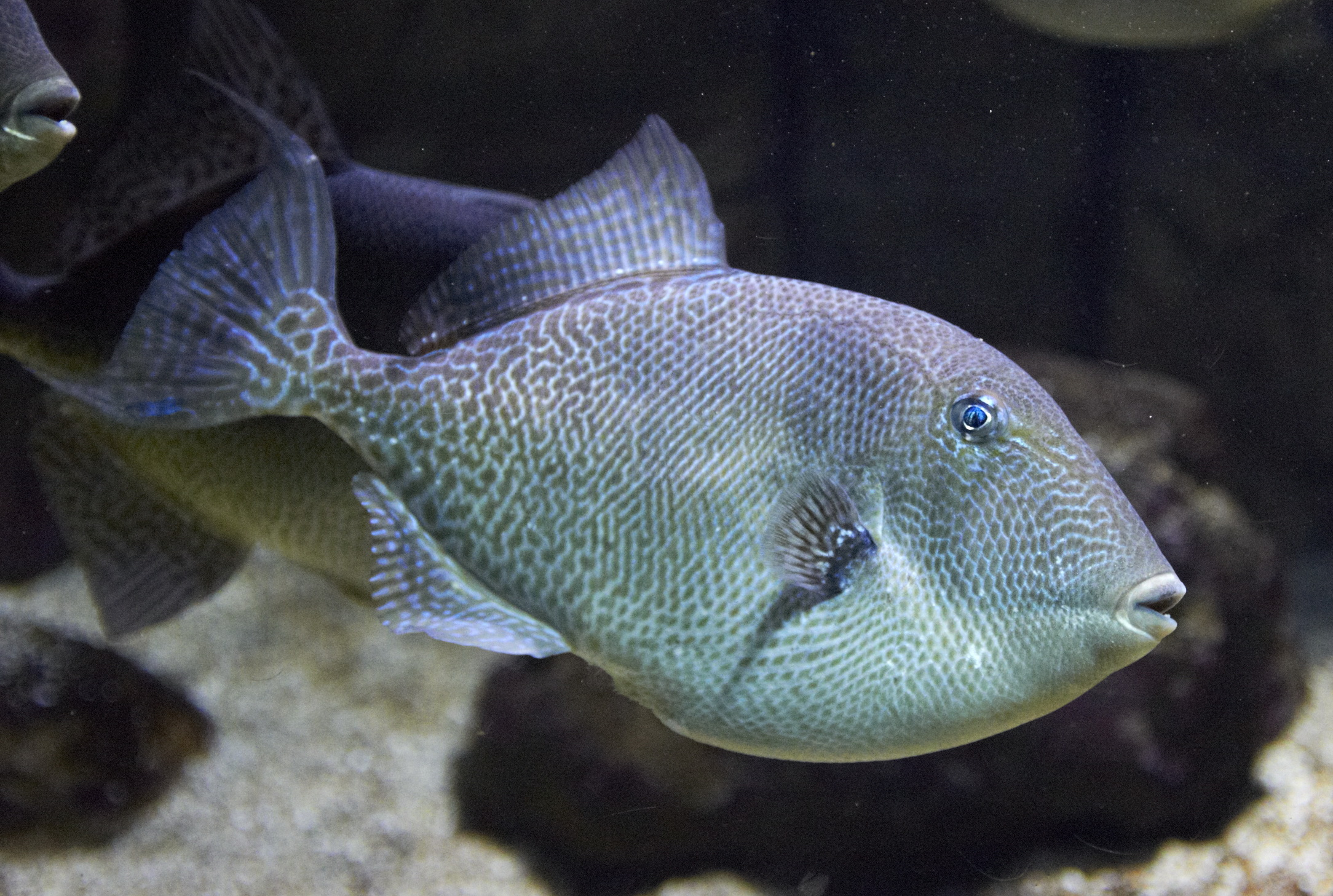
- Grey triggerfish (Balistes capriscus)
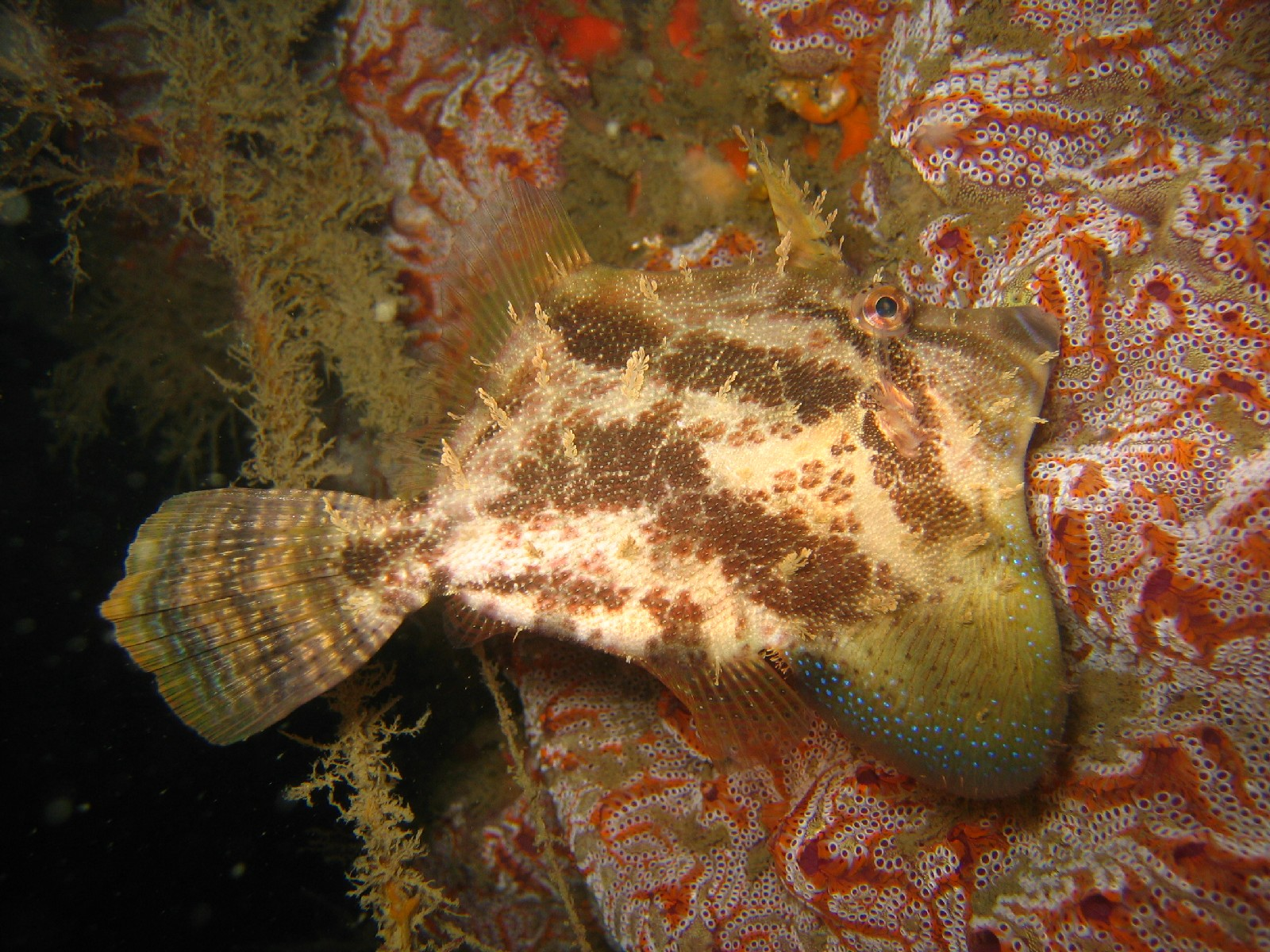
- Monacanthus chinensis

Scientific classification
- Kingdom: Animalia
- Phylum: Chordata
- Class: Actinopterygii
- Order: Tetraodontiformes
- Suborder: Balistoidei; Rafinesque, 1810

Families
- See text

= Balistoidei =

Balistoidei Temporal range: Early Eocene–present

Suborder of fishes

Balistoidei, or Sclerodermi, is a suborder of ray-finned fishes belonging to the order Tetraodontiformes, the order which includes the pufferfishes, ocean sunfishes, boxfishes and related fishes. This suborder comprises four extant and at least four extinct families, the extant species in this taxon are widespread throughout the tropical and temperate seas of the world.

== Taxonomy ==
Balistoidei was proposed as a taxonomic grouping by Rafinesque in 1810 and is recognised by the 5th edition of the Fishes of the World as a suborder of the order Tretraodontiformes. Eschmeyer's Catalog of Fishes also recognises the Balistoidei but includes the Aracanidae and the Ostraciidae within it. On the other hand, other authorities do not recognise any taxa between the level of family and suborder in their Tetraodontoidei.

== Families ==
Balistoidei contains the following families:

- †Bolcabalistidae Santini & Tyler, 2003
- †Moclaybalistidae Santini & Tyler, 2003
- † Eospinidae Santini & Tyler, 2003
- Balistidae Rafinesque, 1810 (Triggerfishes)
- Monacanthidae Nardo, 1843 (Filefishes)
- Superfamily Ostracioidea
  - †Spinacanthidae Santini & Tyler, 2003
  - †Protobalistidae Gill, 1888
  - Aracanidae Hollard, 1860 (deepwater boxfishes)
  - Ostraciidae Rafinesque, 1810 (boxfishes)

== Characteristics ==
Balistoidei is characterised by typically having a laterally compressed body. The frontal bones extand well to the front of the joint between the lateral ethmoid and eithmoid bones. The head and body are covered in scales, often highly modified and sometimes embedded in the skin. They have no pelvic fins, although in some taxa pelvic spines or tubercles may be present and in other a pelvis is present. The first spine in the dorsal fin is lockable and the upper jaw is not protractile and has rows of protruding incisor-like teeth. The soft dorsal fin has between 23 and 52 fin rays while the anal fin has between 20 and 66 fin rays. These fishes have the ability to rotate their eyes independently of each other. The largest species in the suborder is Aluterus scriptus which has been recorded at 1 m (3 ft 3 in) in length.

== Distribution ==
Balistoidei fishes are found in the warm and tropical parts of the Atlantic, Indian and Pacific Oceans.
