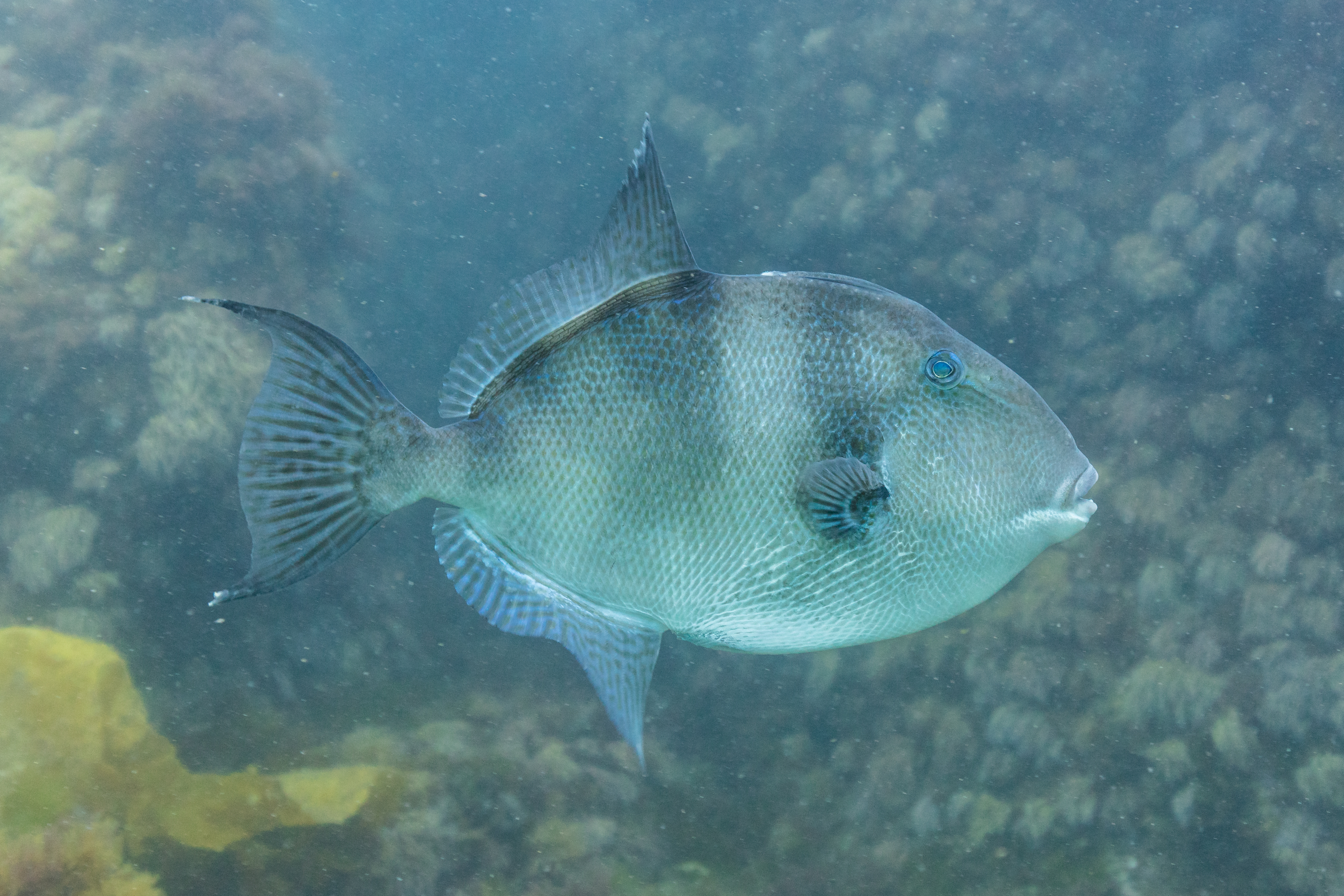

Conservation status
- Vulnerable (IUCN 3.1)

Scientific classification
- Kingdom: Animalia
- Phylum: Chordata
- Class: Actinopterygii
- Division: Teleostei
- Order: Tetraodontiformes
- Family: Balistidae
- Genus: Balistes
- Species: B. capriscus

Binomial name
- Balistes capriscus J. F. Gmelin, 1789

Synonyms
- List: Balistes buniva Lacépède, 1803; Balistes caprinus Valenciennes, 1839; Balistes capriscus Gronow, 1854; Balistes carolinensis Gronow, 1854; Balistes forcipatus Gmelin, 1789; Balistes fuliginosus DeKay, 1842; Balistes moribundus Cope, 1871; Balistes powellii Cope, 1870; Balistes spilotopterygius Walbaum, 1792; Balistes taeniopterus Poey, 1860; Nematobalistes forcipatus (Gmelin, 1789)

= Grey triggerfish =

Species of fish

The grey triggerfish (Balistes capriscus), or gray triggerfish, is a species of ray-finned fish in the triggerfish family Balistidae. The species is native to shallow parts of the western Atlantic from Nova Scotia to Argentina and also the eastern Atlantic, the Mediterranean Sea, and waters off Angola on the west coast of Africa.

In its appearance and habits, the grey triggerfish is a typical member of the genus Balistes except for its drab, uniformly grey coloration. It is a relatively small fish, usually less than 2.3 kg (5.1 lb) in weight. The Grey triggerfish is fished recreationally and, despite its tough skin, is an excellent food-fish. The species is classified as 'vulnerable' by the IUCN Red List.

== Taxonomy ==
The Grey triggerfish was first formally described in 1789 by Johann Friedrich Gmelin with its type locality given as the Western North Atlantic, the Indian Ocean and the Mediterranean Sea. This species is classified in the genus Balistes which is the type genus of the family Balistidae, a family classified in the suborder Balistoidei in the order Tetraodontiformes.

== Etymology ==
The grey triggerfish is classified in the genus Balistes, a name which refers to the first spine of the dorsal fin being locked in place by the erection of the shorter second trigger spine, and unlocked by depressing the second spine. Balistes is taken directly from the Italian pesca ballista, the "crossbow fish". Ballista originally being a machine for throwing arrows. The specific name capriscusis Latin for a "small goat", an allusion Gmelin did not explain, and it is likely to be a mistranslation of its Greek name dating to Aristotle, kápros, which means "boar" or kaprískos. its diminutive, an allusion to its sharp, powerful and perhaps also to a boar-like ferocity, as described by the Roman author and naturalist Claudius Aelianus in De Natura Animalium, "they fight even with fish of greater bulk and with the most skilled fishermen".

== Distribution and habitat ==
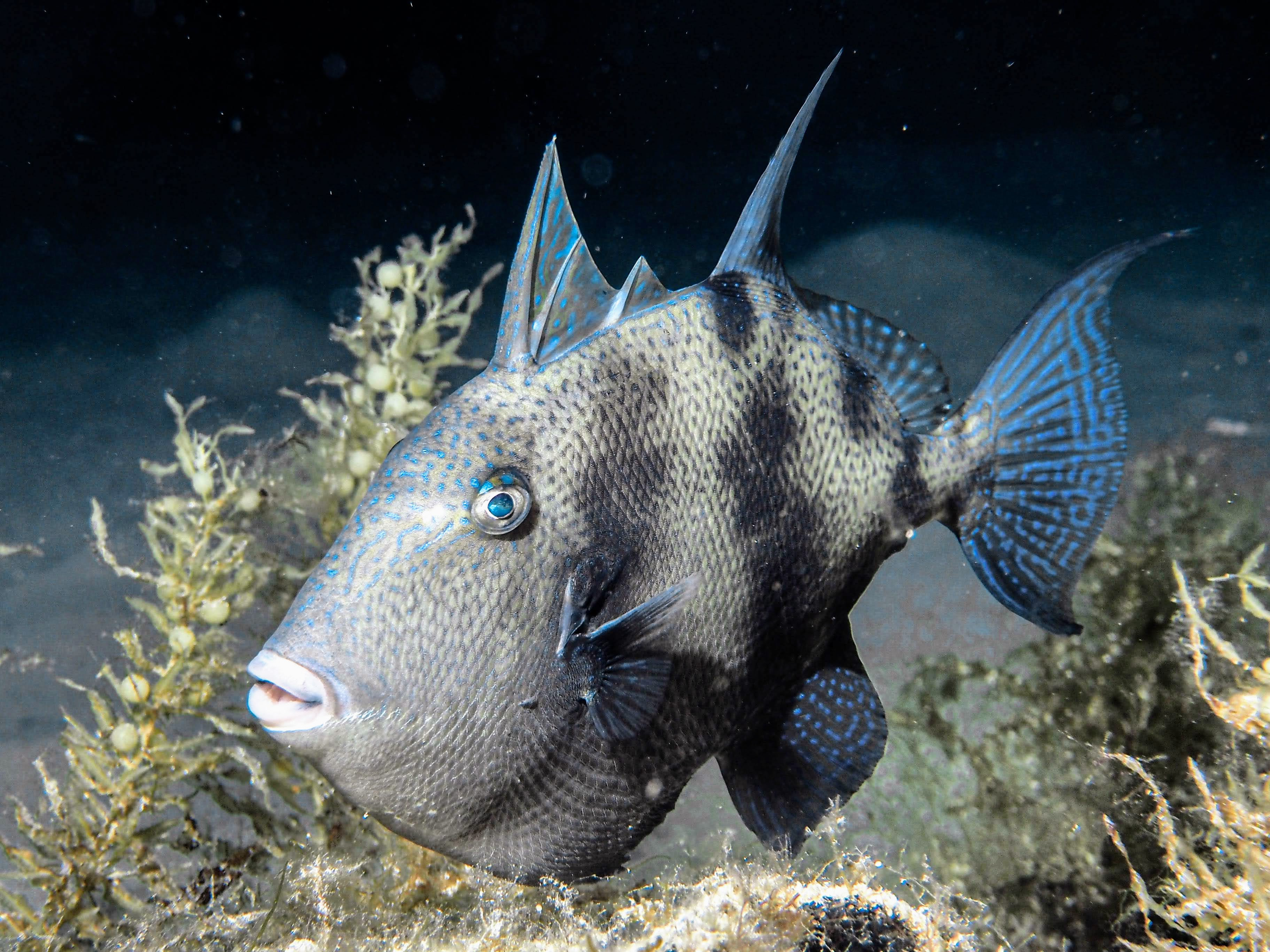
In Malta, showing forehead markings

The grey triggerfish is principally a fish of shallow waters in the western Atlantic Ocean. Its native range extends from Nova Scotia to the Caribbean Sea, the Gulf of Mexico and Bermuda, and southwards to Argentina. It is typically found over hard bottoms on reefs and rocky areas, in lagoons and in bays, at depths down to about 55 m (180 ft). It is also found on the other side of the Atlantic, around the British Isles, in the Mediterranean Sea and off the coast of Angola. It may have crossed the Atlantic as a result of the movement of water in the Gulf Stream and breeds in the Mediterranean.

Once considered to be an uncommon visitor to northern European seas, an increase in records around the Cornish coast, may indicate it is now breeding there; in addition, it has been found in other areas along the coast of Great Britain in recent years, suggesting that its range is continuing to expand northwards, with one caught as far north as the island of Tiree in the Inner Hebrides, Scotland.

== Description ==
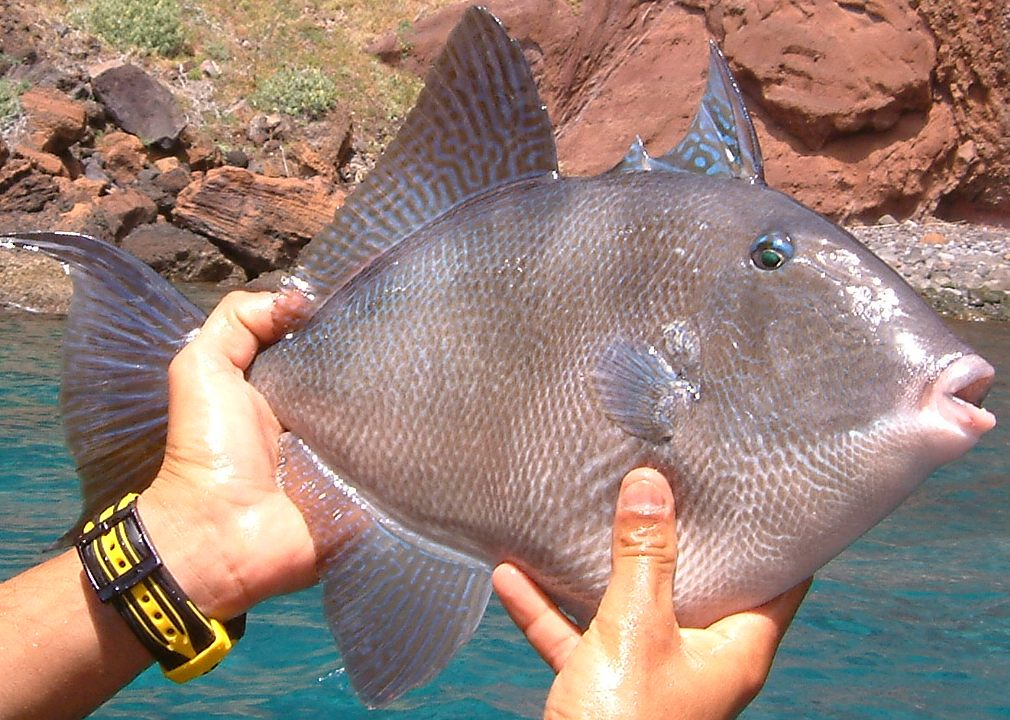
Balistes capriscus

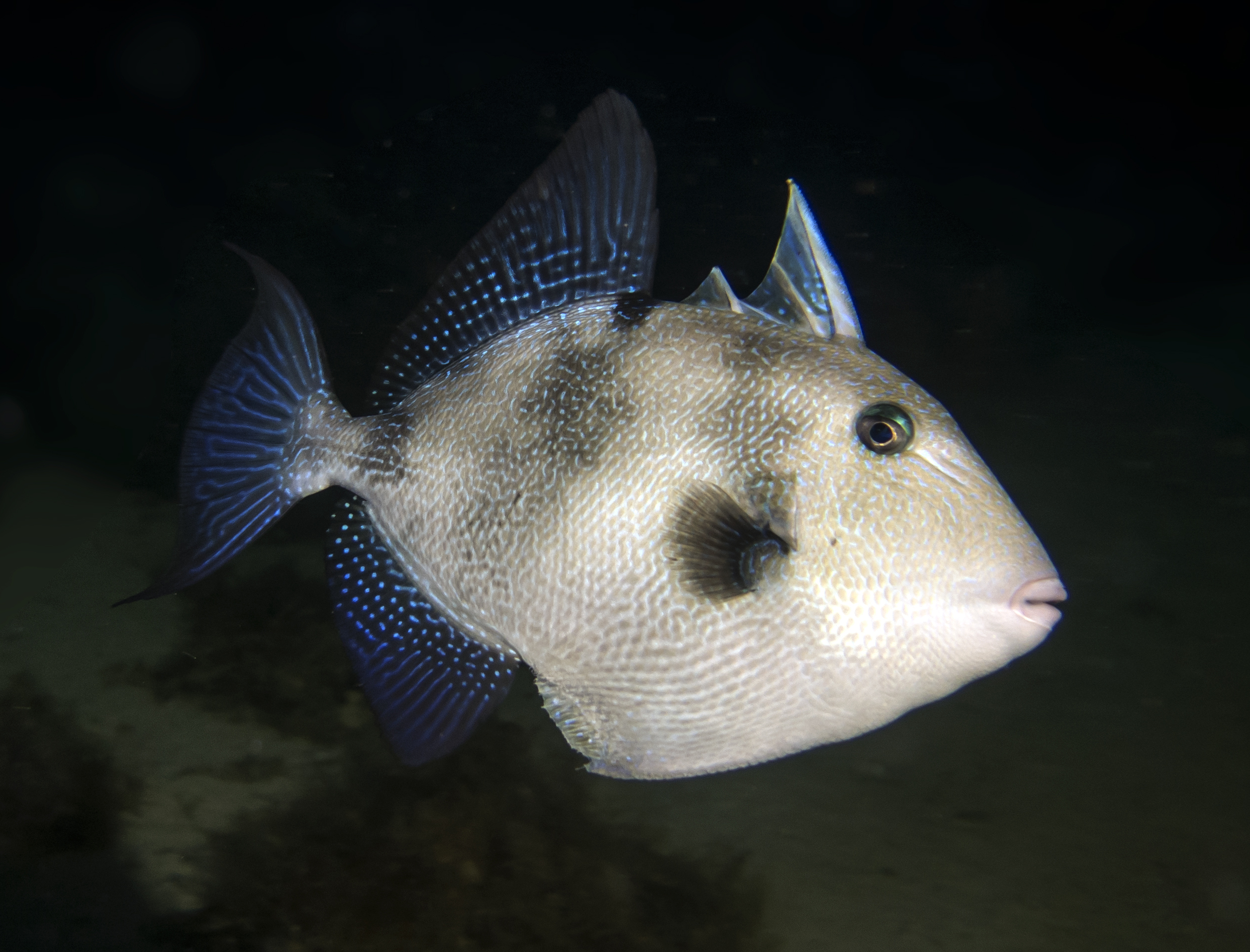
Grey triggerfish at night

The grey triggerfish is a medium-sized fish that can grow to 60 cm (24 in), but a more common length is 44 cm (17 in). The small beak-like mouth at the tip of the snout has fleshy lips. The eyes are set far back near the top of the head. The body is laterally compressed and deep-bodied with a tough, leathery skin. The front dorsal fin has three spines, the first being very strong and much longer than the other two. The second dorsal fin has 26 to 29 soft rays and is much the same size and shape as the anal fin directly below it which has no spines and 23 to 26 soft rays. The pectoral fins are small and rounded. The outer rays of the caudal fin are elongated in larger individuals. The scales on the head and front half of the body are large while those on the hind half are smaller and smooth.

This fish is predominantly pale grey, greenish-grey or yellowish-brown. The body has three indistinct broad dark bars and there is a pale streak on the chin. The upper part of the orbit of the eye is blue and there are some small blue spots and lines on the dorsal fins and upper parts of the body, and sometimes white dots and irregular lines on the lower parts of the body. Both the second dorsal and the anal fin present a somewhat marbled appearance. The body colour fades a little as the animal gets older: juveniles are more colourful.

== Behaviour ==
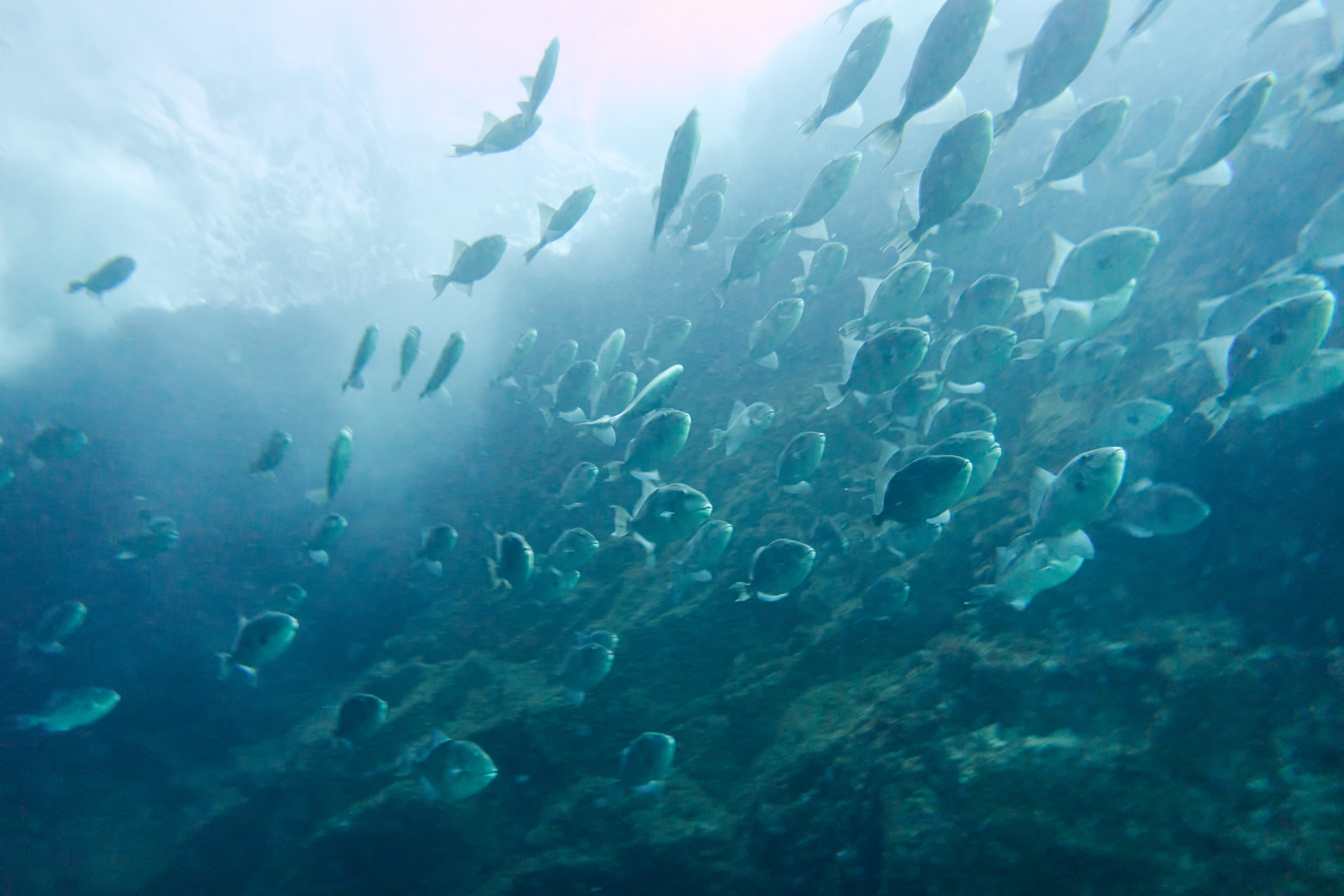
School of grey triggerfish on the Berlengas archipelago, Portugal

Locomotion in the grey triggerfish is by means of undulations of the dorsal fins. If threatened, the fish can work its way into a protective crevice and wedge itself in place by erecting its front dorsal spine. It is difficult to dislodge from this position. The second spine is connected to the first and when it is depressed, it triggers the unlocking of the first spine.

The grey triggerfish is a demersal species and feeds on bottom-dwelling invertebrates such as shrimps, crabs, molluscs, sea urchins, sand dollars, starfish and sea cucumbers. It has strong teeth specialised for making holes in hard-shelled prey. An interesting feeding behaviour has been observed, in which the fish positions itself vertically above a sandy seabed and puffs a stream of water out of its mouth. This disturbs the substrate and may reveal something edible. Further puffs expose more, and the prey item is gripped with the fish's sharp teeth and removed from the seabed. If it is a sand dollar, the fish drops it and picks it up again several times until the prey lands upside down. The fish then adopts its vertical stance once more and attacks the middle with closed jaws, crushing the soft central area. It then scoops out and devours the flesh.

Males develop a charcoal grey colouration and are highly territorial during the breeding season, which commences in summer when the water temperature reaches about 21 °C (70 °F). The males prepare up to a dozen nests in hollows blown out of sandy seabed and then patrol the area, driving unwanted fish away. The females roam around inspecting the nest sites. When a female is ready to spawn, both male and female enter a nest and tightly circle round each other while she lays large numbers of minute eggs and he fertilises them. The female stays in the nest, guarding the eggs and blowing and fanning them. The male defends his territory, which may contain other nests with females guarding their eggs. In this way, the male exhibits harem behaviour. Wrasses and red snappers sometimes feed on the eggs which, if they survive that long, hatch after about fifty hours. The fish larvae migrate up towards the surface of the water where they often become part of the community depending on floating sargassum weed. There they feed on algae, barnacles, hydroids and polychaete worms. In the autumn, when they reach about 15 cm (6 in), the juvenile fish leave the sargassum and sink down to the sea bed.

== Recreational fishing ==
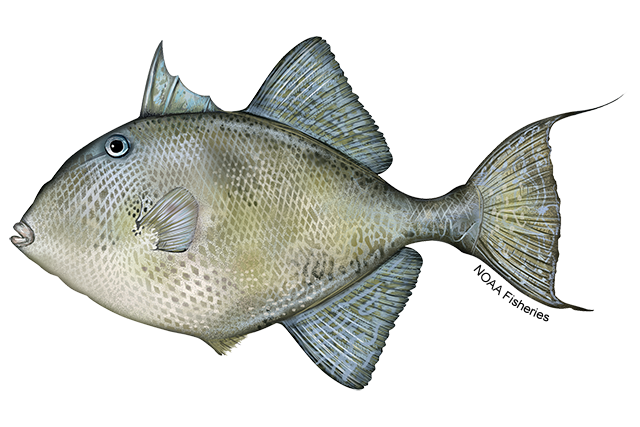
Sketch of grey triggerfish

The grey triggerfish is fished recreationally around Florida and elsewhere. It is known as a notorious bait stealer and is found over hard bottom in 20 to 40 m (66 to 131 ft) depths off the Atlantic Coast of Florida, often in association with black sea bass and red snapper. Because of its bony mouth it needs a small sharp hook which is usually baited with squid or cut bait. The flesh is of high quality but the consumption of this fish has been linked to isolated cases of ciguatera poisoning.

=== Fishing records ===
Authority	Weight	Date/Location	Refs
Florida State	12 lb 7 oz (5.6 kg)	July 15, 2001 near Pensacola	
IGFA	6.15 kg (13 lb 9 oz)	3 May 1989 Murrells Inlet, South Carolina, USA	
BRFC	6 lb 4.8 oz (2.859 kg)	2002 0.5 mile off Tywyn Beach, Wales	
Maryland	5.6 lb (2.5 kg)	30 October 2019 16 miles offshore	
Virginia	6 lb 12 oz (3.1 kg)	November 1, 2017 off Virginia Beach	
