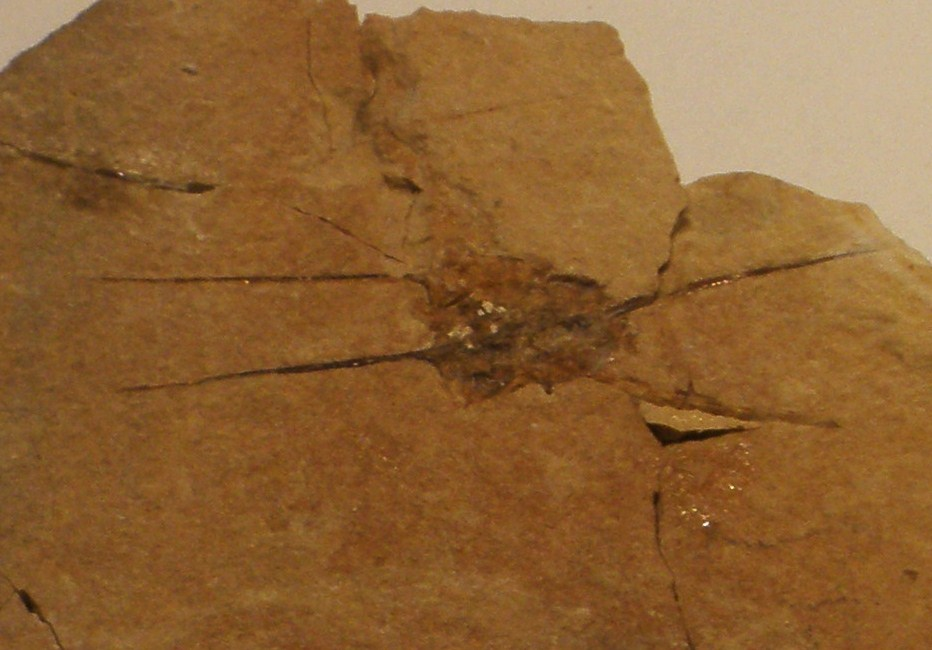
- Fossil specimen

Scientific classification
- Kingdom: Animalia
- Phylum: Chordata
- Class: Actinopterygii
- Order: Tetraodontiformes
- Family: Ostraciidae
- Genus: †Eolactoria; Tyler, 1975
- Species: †E. sorbinii

Binomial name
- †Eolactoria sorbinii Tyler 1975

= Eolactoria =

Eolactoria Temporal range: Late Ypresian

Extinct species of fish

Eolactoria ("dawn Lactoria") is an extinct genus of highly unusual prehistoric boxfish from the Eocene. It contains a single species, E. sorbinii from the Ypresian-aged Monte Bolca site in Italy.

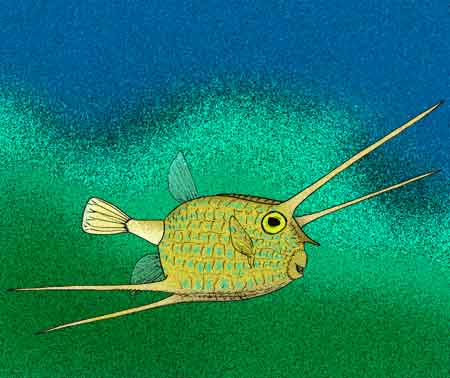
Life restoration

It had two pairs of long spines, one over each eye, and one pair beneath the anal and caudal fins, arranged very similarly to those possessed by the modern genus Lactoria (e.g., "cowfish"), but much longer. E. sorbinii had a fifth spine between the two eye-spines, arranged and looking very much like a nose.

The only known fossil specimen is about 5 cm (2 in) long.

== See also ==
- Proaracana another boxfish that lived in Monte Bolca
- Oligolactoria a possible descendant from the Oligocene
- Prehistoric fish
- List of prehistoric bony fish
