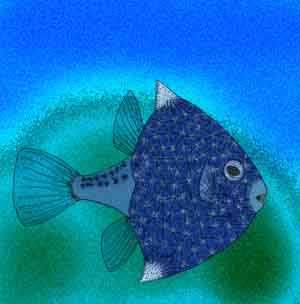
- Artist's reconstruction

Scientific classification
- Domain: Eukaryota
- Kingdom: Animalia
- Phylum: Chordata
- Class: Actinopterygii
- Order: Tetraodontiformes
- Family: Aracanidae
- Genus: †Proaracana; Le Danois, 1961
- Species: †P. dubia

Binomial name
- †Proaracana dubia (Blainville, 1818)

Synonyms
- Ostracion sp.; Ostracion dubius (Blainville, 1818)

= Proaracana =

Proaracana Temporal range: Early- Middle Eocene

Extinct genus of fishes

Proaracana dubia is an extinct, prehistoric aracanid boxfish that lived during the Lutetian of middle Eocene Monte Bolca.

== See also ==
- Eolactoria
- Prehistoric fish
- List of prehistoric bony fish
