= Rhinecanthus lunula =

Halfmoon Picassofish

Conservation status
- Least Concern (IUCN 3.1)

Scientific classification
- Kingdom: Animalia
- Phylum: Chordata
- Class: Actinopterygii
- Order: Tetraodontiformes
- Family: Balistidae
- Genus: Rhinecanthus
- Species: R. lunula

Binomial name
- Rhinecanthus lunula J. E. Randall & Steene, 1983

Species of fish

Rhinecanthus lunula, commonly known as the halfmoon picassofish, is a species of balistid triggerfish first described by John E. Randall and Roger C. Steene in 1983. It belongs to the Indo-Pacific triggerfish genus Rhinecanthus.

== Physical description ==
While the standard length of Rhinecanthus lunula holotype is 180 mm (7.1 in), the standard length of other type specimens ranges from 45.6 to 218 mm (1.80 to 8.58 in). R. lunula can be differentiated from other Rhinecanthus species by its soft ray count and distinct coloration. It usually has 26 soft dorsal rays (though sometimes only 25 are observed), between 22 and 24 anal soft rays, and 14 pectoral rays. The longest dorsal soft ray is 11.7 percent of the standard length. A broad, black bar exists on the caudal peduncle. Anterior to the caudal peduncle is a curved black line which gives the species its name "lunula," the Latin word for crescent. An orange-yellow band starts from the base of the upper lip and extends across the head to the pectoral base. In addition, the fish has a long snout, a concave dorsal profile, and an elongate body. The greatest body depth is between 2.2 and 2.6 percent of its standard length.

Randall and Steene noted many differences between juvenile R. lunula and adults. For example, the caudal fin of a juvenile is rounded in a juvenile before becoming slightly double emarginate as it develops into an adult. Juveniles are also missing some of coloration that stands out in adults: there is no blackish area on the ventral side, black bars below the eyes are not well-developed, and the black crescent near the caudal peduncle (which gives the species its name) is also missing. However, there are also two yellow stripes present on juveniles that are not seen on adults. Additionally, the interorbital space is slightly concave in juveniles but becomes slightly convex in adults.

== Distribution ==
A rare species, R. lunula has a small geographic distribution. When first described as a species, R. lunula was only known to exist from the Pitcairn Islands to Queensland, Australia. The holotype of the species was collected by John E. Randall in a barrier reef near the Society Islands of Tahiti, and juvenile specimens were collected near Queensland, Australia. While most reported sightings of the species have occurred within the same geographic range noted by Randall and Steene, a single sighting of R. lunula has been recorded by scuba divers in Egypt. However, the fish seen in Egypt may have been misidentified, as other members of the Rhinecanthus, R. aculeatus and R. rectangulus, are known to exist in Africa.

Rhinecanthus lunula are generally found in the outer areas of coral reefs 10 meters or deeper. Though the maximum depth of their habitat is unknown, triggerfishes of the Balistidae are known to exist up to 50 meters deep. Habitat may differ by age for R. lunula, as it is known that Rhinecanthus aculeatus juveniles tend to live near beaches while adults tend to live on barrier reefs. Distribution of a given Balistid species among an ecosystem may also be influenced by their diet and the distribution of food sources.

== Reproduction ==
A main characteristic of the triggerfish family Balistidae, to which Rhinecanthus lunula belongs, is a haremic mating system in which a male has multiple female mates.
