= Wedgetail =

Wedgetail may refer to:

- Boeing E-7 Wedgetail, an airborne early warning and control aircraft
- Acanthagrion, a genus of damselflies commonly called wedgetails
- Wedge-tail triggerfish
- Wedge-tailed eagle
