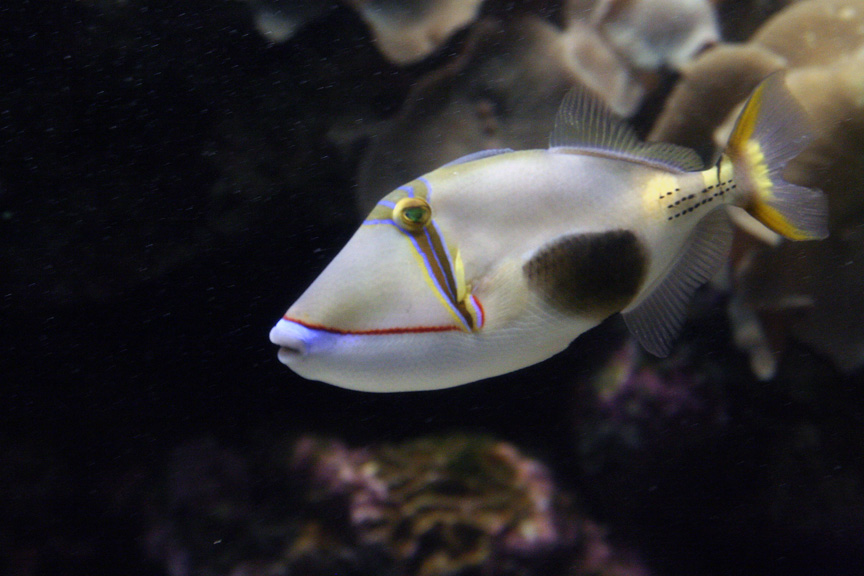

Conservation status
- Least Concern (IUCN 3.1)

Scientific classification
- Kingdom: Animalia
- Phylum: Chordata
- Class: Actinopterygii
- Division: Teleostei
- Order: Tetraodontiformes
- Family: Balistidae
- Genus: Rhinecanthus
- Species: R. verrucosus

Binomial name
- Rhinecanthus verrucosus (Linnaeus, 1758)

Synonyms
- Balistes verrucosus Linnaeus, 1758

= Blackbelly triggerfish =

Species of fish

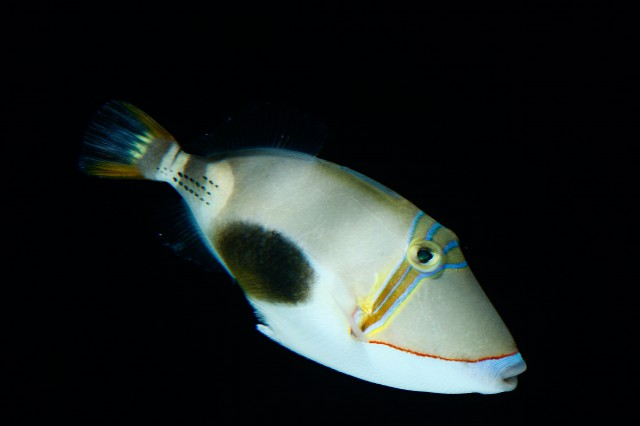
Blackbelly triggerfish

The blackbelly triggerfish (Rhinecanthus verrucosus) is a ray-finned fish in the family Balistidae found in the Indo-Pacific. It occasionally makes its way into the aquarium trade. It is sometimes known as the blackpatch triggerfish.

== Description ==
The blackbelly triggerfish has a laterally compressed, deep body and a long snout. In shape it is rhomboidal and it grows to a maximum length of 23 cm (9.1 in). The mouth is at the tip of the snout and the eye is set high on a long, straight forehead. The upper half of the body is pale brown and the underparts are white. There is a dark brown streak below the eye and a very large black spot on the underside just anterior to the anal fin. There are three short rows of forward pointing spines on the caudal peduncle. The anterior part of the dorsal fin consists of three spines which can be retracted into a groove and the separate posterior part has 23–26 soft rays. The anal fin is very much the same shape as the posterior dorsal fin and has 21–23 soft rays. The pectoral fin has 13–14 rays. The pelvic fin is covered by a flap of skin except for its extreme tip.

== Distribution ==
The blackbelly triggerfish is native to shallow areas of the Indo-Pacific where it ranges from the Seychelles and Chagos Islands to Japan, Vanuatu, and Australia. A likely aquarium release was sighted near Boca Raton, Florida in 1995.

== Habitat ==
The blackbelly triggerfish is a territorial species and defends its territory against other triggerfish including the lagoon triggerfish (Rhinecanthus aculeatus). Its habitat is lagoons and reef flats where it favours areas with seaweed, corals, seagrasses, sandy flats, and stony places. It may move from place to place according to the status of the tide.
