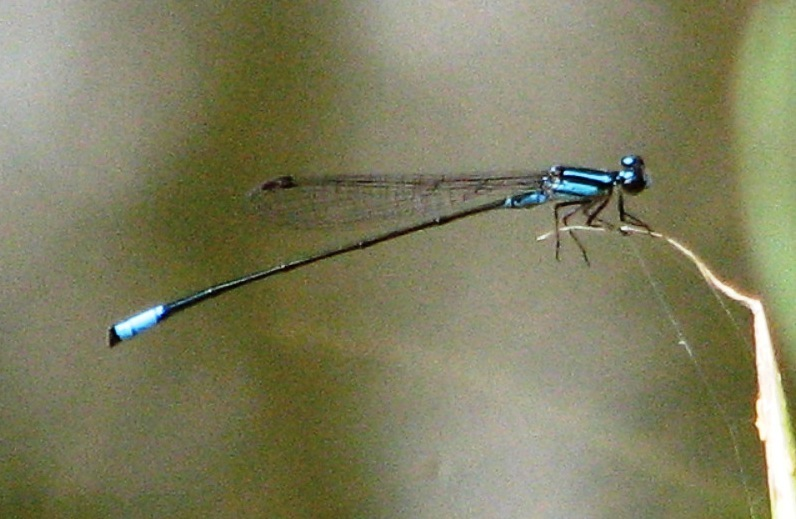

Conservation status
- Least Concern (IUCN 3.1)

Scientific classification
- Kingdom: Animalia
- Phylum: Arthropoda
- Class: Insecta
- Order: Odonata
- Suborder: Zygoptera
- Family: Coenagrionidae
- Genus: Acanthagrion
- Species: A. quadratum

Binomial name
- Acanthagrion quadratum Selys, 1876

= Acanthagrion quadratum =

Species of damselfly

Acanthagrion quadratum, or Mexican wedgetail, is a pond damselfly of the family Coenagrionidae. It was first described by Edmond de Sélys Longchamps in 1876.

== Habitat and distribution ==
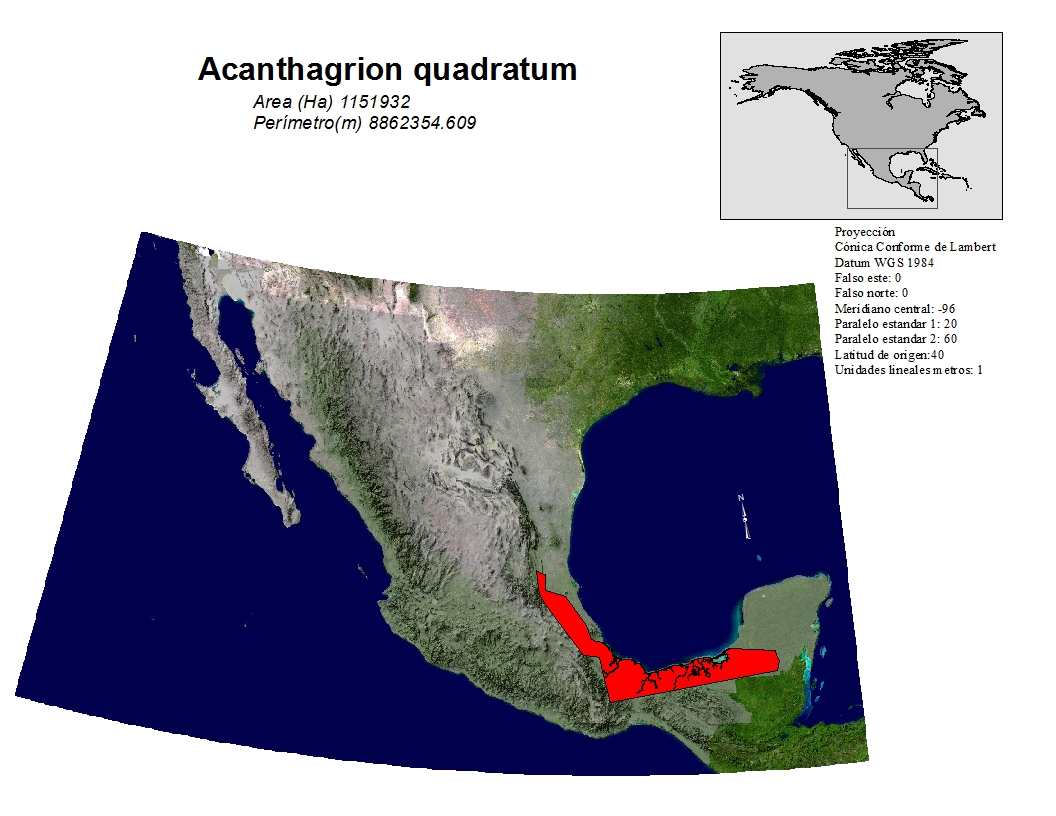
Acanthagrion quadratum distribution

Acanthagrion quadratum is found in ponds with abundant vegetation, slow creeks and open marshes; also in marshy areas under the vegetation cover. It is distributed from the southern United States to Costa Rica. In Mexico, it has been recorded in the states of Campeche, Chiapas, Coahuila, Hidalgo, Nuevo León, Oaxaca, Puebla, Querétaro, Quintana Roo, San Luis Potosí, Tabasco, Tamaulipas, Veracruz and Yucatán. It is an abundant species.

== Description and identification ==
Adult males have a distinctive abdominal tip. The eyes mostly black with green tones at the bottom and large blue post-ocular spots. It has a blue thorax with medium blue and black humeral stripes and a thin white line at the sides. The abdomen is black with blue portions on the sides of segment 1 to 2, the final part of segment 7, and 8 to 9. Females are similar in color to males, but with lighter eyes. Their thorax is paler blue, while the abdomen has marks on the sides and tip, usually the base of segment eight is blue. The number 9 segment is blue with black marks on each side of the base. Segment 10 completely blue. The tip of the abdomen is quite variable and less blue in more Southerly distributions.

The larvae are distinguished from others of the same genus, by having 3 premental setae, 4 setae in the lip palpus and a caudal lamella 8 to 10 times longer than its widest part.

== Natural history ==
Males and females perch at a low height at the height of the water or are distributed along beds of herbaceous vegetation. The males rise in the air as they face each other, exposing themselves with the tip of their abdomen raised. Pairs lay their eggs in herbaceous vegetation. Despite being a common animal, there is little data on behavior or ecology.

== Flight season ==
In Texas, the flight period is from May to October. In other places closer to the tropics, the season can last longer.

== Status of the species ==
Both the Mexican legislation NOM-059-SEMARNAT2010 and the IUCN do not consider this species within any of the risk categories.
