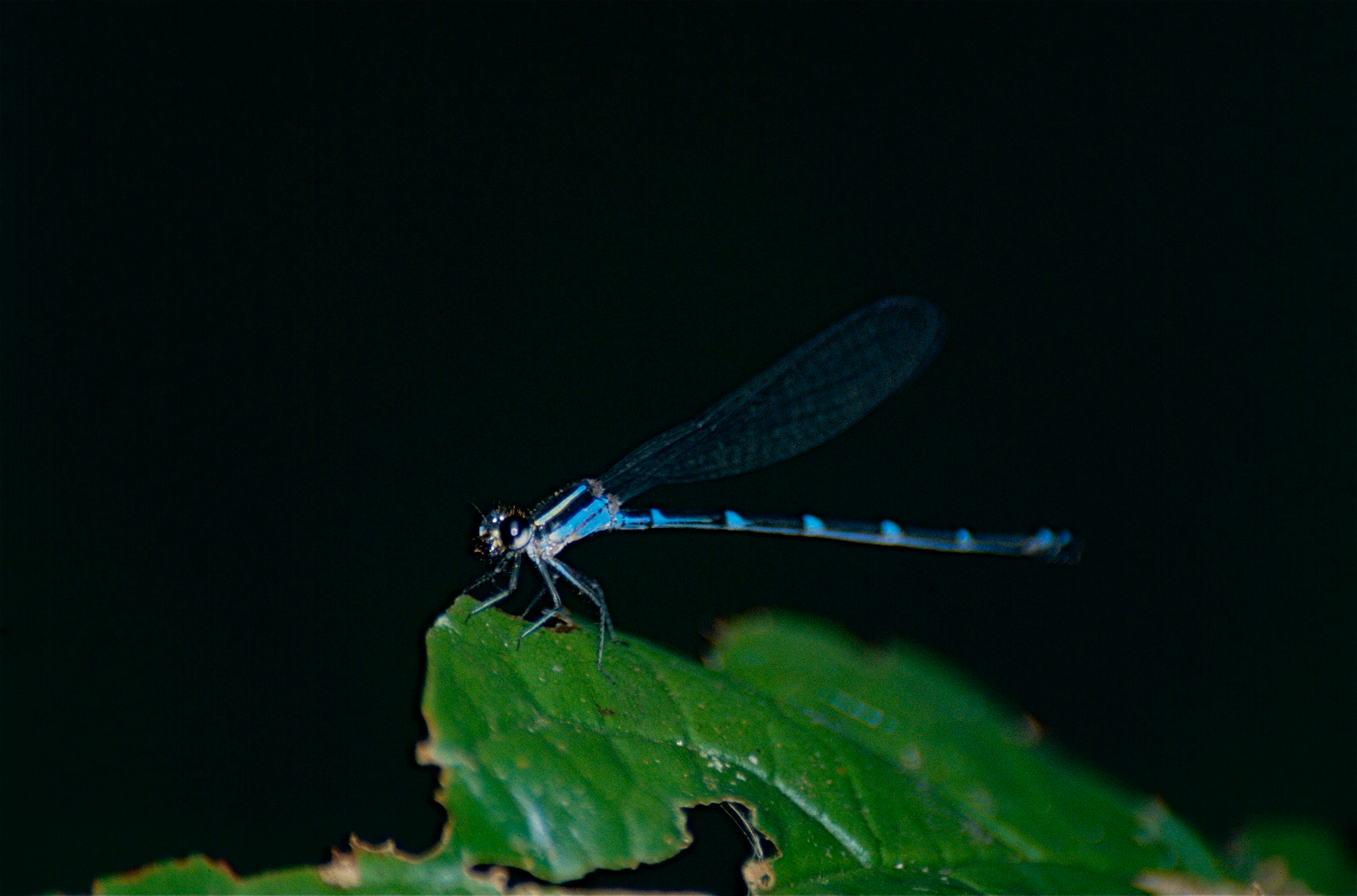
- Acanthagrion

Scientific classification
- Kingdom: Animalia
- Phylum: Arthropoda
- Class: Insecta
- Order: Odonata
- Suborder: Zygoptera
- Family: Coenagrionidae
- Genus: Acanthagrion; Selys, 1876

= Acanthagrion =

Genus of damselflies

Acanthagrion is a genus of damselflies. It is the dominant genus of damselfly at ponds and lakes in the Neotropics but A. quadratum is the only one found in North America. They are commonly known as Wedgetails because of the raised tip of the abdomen.

The genus contains the following species:

- Acanthagrion abunae Leonard, 1977
- Acanthagrion adustum Williamson, 1916
- Acanthagrion aepiolum Tennessen, 2004
- Acanthagrion amazonicum Sjöstedt, 1918
- Acanthagrion apicale Selys, 1876
- Acanthagrion ascendens Calvert, 1909
- Acanthagrion chacoense Calvert, 1909
- Acanthagrion chararum Calvert, 1909
- Acanthagrion cuyabae Calvert, 1909
- Acanthagrion dichrostigma De Marmels, 1985
- Acanthagrion egleri Santos, 1961
- Acanthagrion floridense Fraser, 1946
- Acanthagrion fluviatile (De Marmels, 1984)
- Acanthagrion gracile (Rambur, 1842)
- Acanthagrion hartei Muzón & Lozano, 2005
- Acanthagrion hildegarda Gloger, 1967
- Acanthagrion indefensum Williamson, 1916
- Acanthagrion inexpectum Leonard, 1977
- Acanthagrion jessei Leonard, 1977
- Acanthagrion kennedii Williamson, 1916
- Acanthagrion lancea Selys, 1876
- Acanthagrion latapistylum Calvert, 1902
- Acanthagrion longispinosum Leonard, 1977
- Acanthagrion minutum Leonard, 1977
- Acanthagrion obsoletum (Förster, 1914)
- Acanthagrion peruanum Schmidt, 1942
- Acanthagrion peruvianum Leonard, 1977
- Acanthagrion phallicorne Leonard, 1977
- Acanthagrion quadratum Selys, 1876 - Mexican wedgetail
- Acanthagrion rubrifrons Leonard, 1977
- Acanthagrion speculum Garrison, 1985
- Acanthagrion taxaense Santos, 1965
- Acanthagrion temporale Selys, 1876
- Acanthagrion tepuiense De Marmels, 1985
- Acanthagrion trilobatum Leonard, 1977
- Acanthagrion truncatum Selys, 1876
- Acanthagrion vidua Selys, 1876
- Acanthagrion viridescens Leonard, 1977
- Acanthagrion williamsoni Leonard, 1977
- Acanthagrion yungarum Ris, 1918
