= Rhinecanthus abyssus =

Conservation status
- Data Deficient (IUCN 3.1)

Scientific classification
- Kingdom: Animalia
- Phylum: Chordata
- Class: Actinopterygii
- Order: Tetraodontiformes
- Family: Balistidae
- Genus: Rhinecanthus
- Species: R. abyssus

Binomial name
- Rhinecanthus abyssus Matsuura & Shobara, 1989

Species of fish

Rhinecanthus abyssus is a species of triggerfish found in the West Pacific Ocean, where known from Sulawesi in Indonesian and around the Ryukyu Islands of Japan. It is found at depths ranging from 120–150 m (390–490 ft). It is the most recently described of 7 species in the genus Rhinecanthus.

== Behavior ==
Little is known about the behavior of this species presently.
