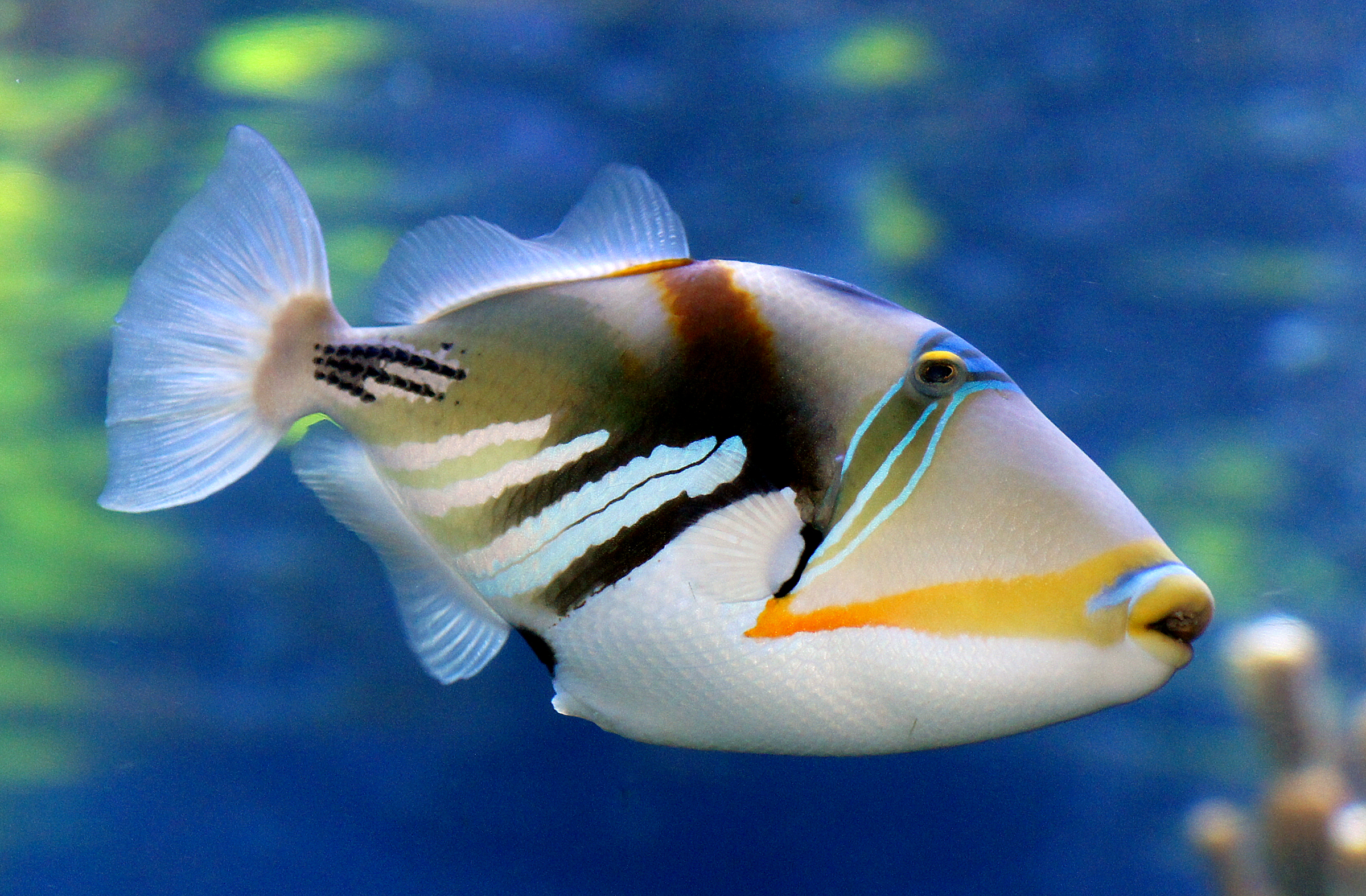
- Rhinecanthus aculeatus

Scientific classification
- Kingdom: Animalia
- Phylum: Chordata
- Class: Actinopterygii
- Division: Teleostei
- Order: Tetraodontiformes
- Family: Balistidae
- Genus: Rhinecanthus; Swainson, 1839

Type species
- Balistes ornatissimus Lesson 1831

= Rhinecanthus =

Genus of fishes

Rhinecanthus is a triggerfish genus from the Indo-Pacific. They are found at reefs, and all except R. abyssus are restricted to relatively shallow depths. They are among the smallest members of the family, with no species surpassing 30 centimetres (12 in) in length. They are primarily brownish, greyish and white, and have strongly contrasingly patterns in yellow, orange, blue or black. Adults of all have a relatively dark line (in most species intermixed with blue) that extends from the forehead down through the eye to the pectoral fin.

== Species ==
There are currently 7 recognized species in this genus:

Image	Scientific name	Common name	Distribution
	Rhinecanthus abyssus Matsuura & Shiobara, 1989	Deepwater Triggerfish	Western Pacific
	Rhinecanthus aculeatus Linnaeus, 1758	Lagoon triggerfish	Indo-Pacific
	Rhinecanthus assasi Forsskål, 1775	Picasso triggerfish	Western Indian Ocean
	Rhinecanthus cinereus Bonnaterre, 1788	Mauritius Picasso triggerfish	Mauritius
	Rhinecanthus lunula J. E. Randall & Steene, 1983	Halfmoon picassofish	Indo-Pacific
	Rhinecanthus rectangulus Bloch & J. G. Schneider, 1801	Reef triggerfish	Indo-Pacific
	Rhinecanthus verrucosus Linnaeus, 1758	Blackbelly triggerfish	Indo-Pacific.
