= Fluminagrion taxaense =

Conservation status
- Critically Endangered (IUCN 3.1)

Scientific classification
- Kingdom: Animalia
- Phylum: Arthropoda
- Class: Insecta
- Order: Odonata
- Suborder: Zygoptera
- Family: Coenagrionidae
- Genus: Fluminagrion; Anjos-Santos, Lozano & Costa, 2013
- Species: F. taxaense

Binomial name
- Fluminagrion taxaense (Santos, 1965)

Synonyms
- Acanthagrion taxaense

Species of damselfly

Fluminagrion taxaense is a critically endangered species of damselfly endemic to Brazil. It may be restricted to Rio de Janeiro, and could possibly be extinct as it has not been seen since its description in 1965. Some of the characteristics of this species are posterior lobe of prothorax trilobate, medial lobe rounded in both male and female, segment 3 of genital ligula C-shaped in lateral view and lack of mesepisternal fossa in female S8 with vulvar spine
