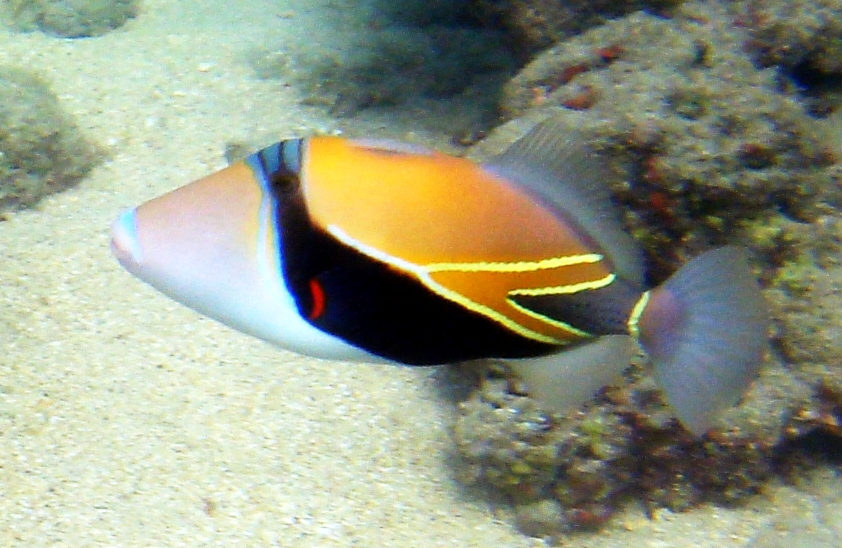
- In Hawaii

Conservation status
- Least Concern (IUCN 3.1)

Scientific classification
- Kingdom: Animalia
- Phylum: Chordata
- Class: Actinopterygii
- Division: Teleostei
- Order: Tetraodontiformes
- Family: Balistidae
- Genus: Rhinecanthus
- Species: R. rectangulus

Binomial name
- Rhinecanthus rectangulus (Bloch & J. G. Schneider, 1801)

= Reef triggerfish =

Species of fish

The reef triggerfish (Rhinecanthus rectangulus), also known as the rectangular triggerfish, wedgetail triggerfish or by its Hawaiian name humuhumunukunukuāpuaʻa (pronounced [ˈhumuˈhumuˈnukuˈnukuˈwaːpuˈwɐʔə], meaning 'triggerfish with a snout like a pig', also spelled humuhumunukunukuapua'a or just humuhumu for short), is one of several species of triggerfish. It is found in coral reefs in the entirety of the Western Pacific Ocean from North to South and Eastern Central Pacific. It is also found in the Indian Ocean from East to West and the Southeast Atlantic Ocean. It exists in 0 to 50 meters in depth.

== Description ==
It has a small second dorsal spine which is used to lock its main spine into an upright position. When sheltering in a small crevice, this locking helps protect the fish against extraction by a predator.

The reef triggerfish is characterized by having a noticeably large snout and blue lips that resemble that of a pig's snout. It has strong teeth and a terminal mouth which help aid in scraping food off surfaces. Along the dorsal side and anterior end of the fish, it has an orange-brown coloration and a white belly. The reef triggerfish has 3 dorsal spines, 22–25 dorsal rays, no anal spines, and 20–22 anal soft rays. The soft dorsal fins, anal fins, and pectoral fins have a pale white coloration to it. The caudal fin has a cloudy murky color. Reef Triggerfish get to about 30 cm (11.8 inches) in total length.

The reef triggerfish is commonly confused with its two closest living relatives, the lagoon triggerfish and picasso triggerfish.

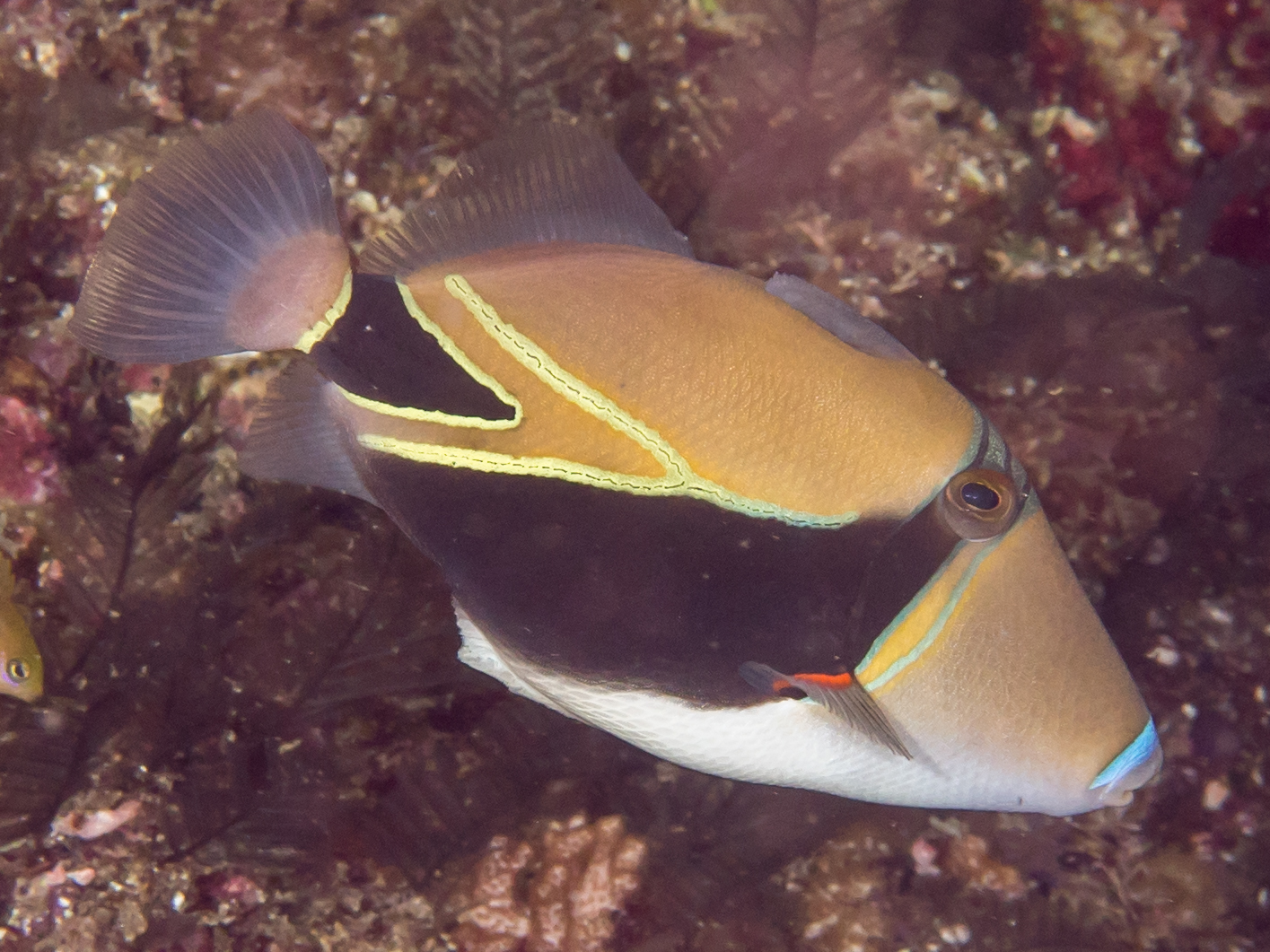
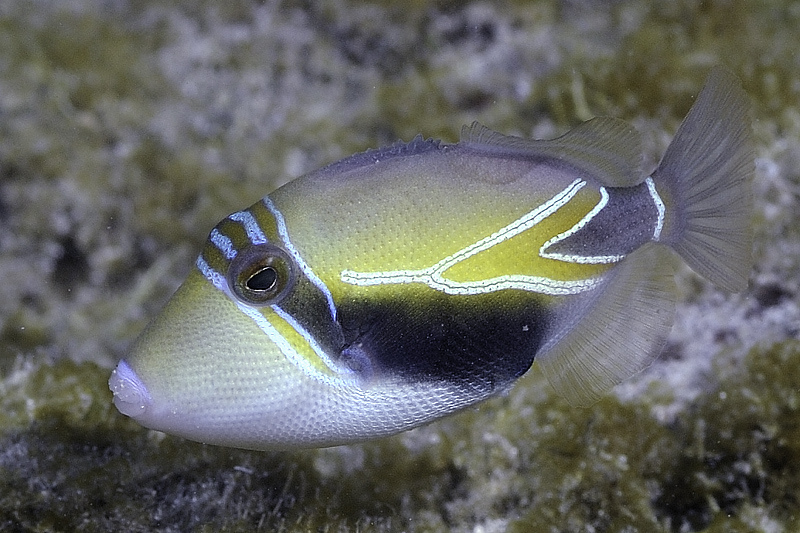
Adult (top) and juvenile (bottom)

== Feeding ==
The reef triggerfish has a terminal mouth that sits directly at the end of its snout. It has heavy teeth and incisors, and most of its food content is algae that is scraped off surfaces. It also feeds on crustaceans such as isopods from the sandy ocean floors. When foraging for food it remains close to its home or forages in shallow reefs away from living coral. This fish is considered a facultative omnivore because while it eats plants and animals it can sustain itself on a diet of either.

== Sounds ==
The reef triggerfish is recorded to make four distinct sounds that have been categorized as grinding, drumming, grunting, and snapping. Attached is a recording of what the reef triggerfish's drumming noise sounds like.

The grinding sounds are heard when eating. This is thought to be a signal used to indicate to other reef triggerfish that the territory is theirs. It is also believed that it is used to advertise their territories to attract females.

Drumming sounds occur by flapping the pelvic fins from the sonic membrane creating a vibration connection to the swim bladder. The swim bladder acts as a chamber to produce low and high-frequency sounds. Drum rates increase when there are predators around which can serve as an antipredation function. These drumming sounds are similar to grunting sounds which both involve the use of the swim bladder. Grunts are identical to that of a pig grunt and are mostly audible and recorded when physically holding the fish.

Snaps occur by the rapid extensions and retraction of the jaw. Audibly, there are no real differences between a snap and a grinding sound however they occur at different frequencies and settings. The snaps are most observed during conspecific interactions such as territorial conflict. Although the true meaning of the snaps remains a mystery, reef triggerfish show no signs of kin selection.

== Swimming ==
Fish in the Balistidae family, like the reef triggerfish, have unique and adaptive swimming motions. Triggerfish are thought to have low swimming maneuvers. To compensate for such behavior there are morphological adaptations. These fish have thick skin to aid in predation evasion. While swimming at low speeds their flexibility in dorsal and anal fins makes it capable for them to exhibit balistiform locomotion. Within these fins, they are also able to independently move them and generate their own thrust allowing them to move in all sorts of directions including backwards and hover in place.

The muscle of reef triggerfish are red which are ideal for fish that are constantly on the move, much like this species of triggerfish. Since this fish is always hunting for prey, foraging, and defending its territory. They also have white muscle that is effective in quick bursts of movement and helps aid them in complex maneuvers.

== Life history ==
In Hawaii

While there is limited direct information on reproductive modes and strategies for the reef triggerfish behaviors within triggerfish overlap one another. Examining the reproductive behavior of the picasso triggerfish one conclusion that can be drawn is that reef triggerfish exhibit similar behaviors.

Both female and male picasso triggerfish are territorial in space for foraging and egg spawning. While the female's criteria is based on the amount of food resources, low predation, and space that is available, a male's territory is determined by dominance. In the male's case, a haremic mating system is placed where the more dominant males have more access to female mates. This is meant to increase the reproductive success of males however, while defending a female it can leave other females vulnerable to other males decreasing the reproductive success of the original male.

Males will generally invest more energy and resources in physical growth rather than reproduction. Females will invest more in reaching sexual maturity than halting physical growth. The difference in these life strategies reveals that females are smaller in size compared to males, but also an age difference.

== Conservation status ==
Currently under the IUCN Red List, the reef triggerfish is listed as least concern. Although because the reef triggerfish is found to live in coral reefs, there are still many threats that may present themselves in the future. Currently one major threat is that of global warming and its effects on coral reefs, which decrease oxygen levels and can increase hypoxia in reef triggerfish. However, one study found that reef triggerfish can tolerate high levels of hypoxia.

== Hawaii state fish ==
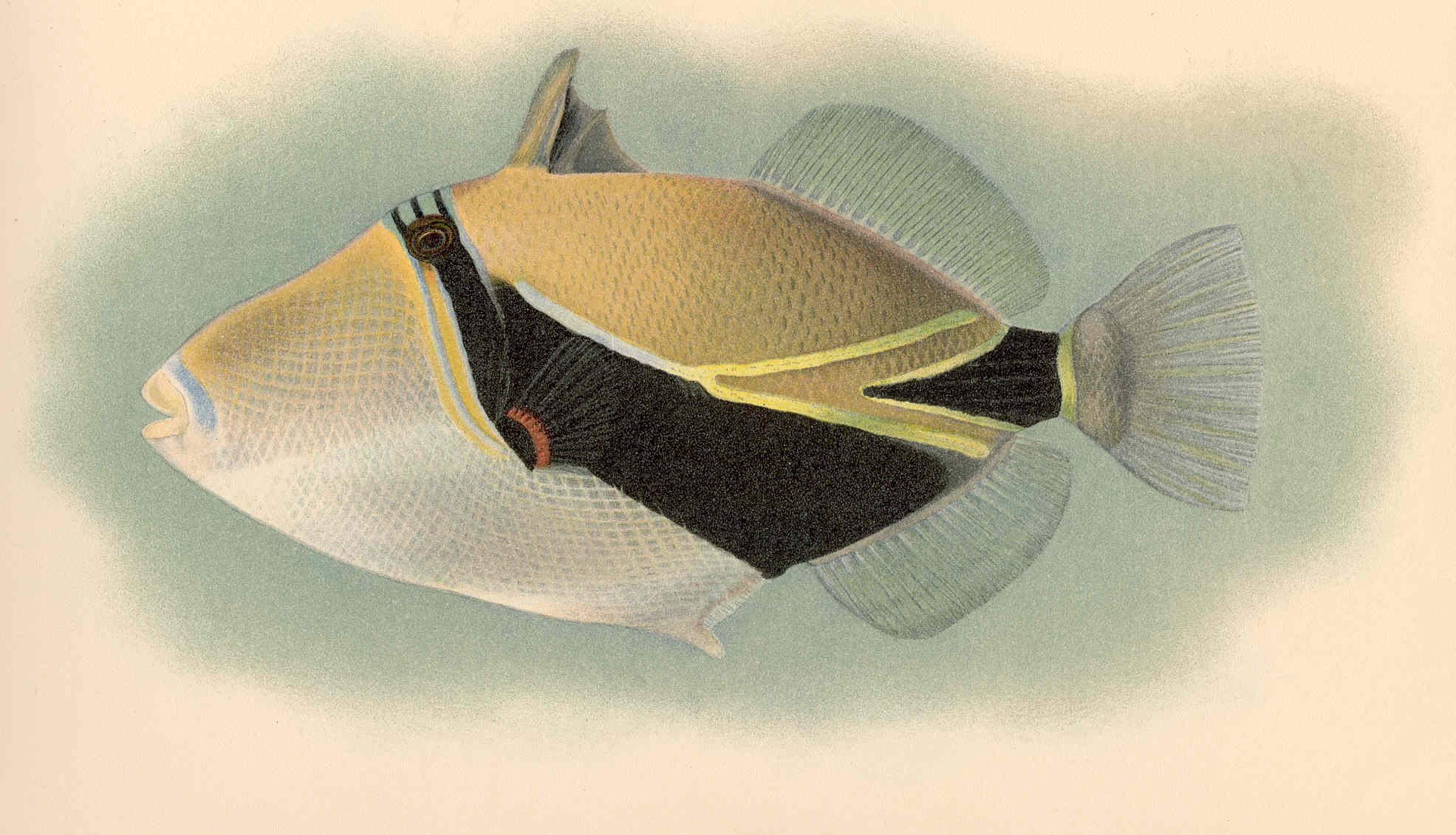
1905 illustration from Shore Fishes of the Hawaiian Islands

The reef triggerfish was designated the official fish of Hawaii in 1985, but due to an expiration of a Hawaiian state law after five years, it ceased to be the state fish in 1990. On April 17, 2006, bill HB1982 was presented to the Governor of Hawaiʻi, which permanently reinstated the reef triggerfish (humuhumunukunukuāpuaʻa) as the state fish of Hawaii. The bill passed into law on May 2, 2006.

The reef triggerfish also holds cultural values to the Hawaiian natives. This triggerfish is thought to be connected to the Hawaiian pig god Kamapuaʻa. Kamapuaʻa was notorious for his violent behaviors. He ended up marrying the fire goddess Pele, who he fought for control of the ocean. Pele requested the help of the underworld and other gods; together, they drove Kamapuaʻa over a cliff, where he fell into the ocean and was transformed into the reef triggerfish. The fish's thick skin is meant to symbolize the armor needed to swim past the waves of Pele.

== In popular culture ==
The Hawaiian name of the triggerfish is mentioned in multiple songs such as the 1933 song "My Little Grass Shack in Kealakekua, Hawaii" by Ted Fio Rito includes the line "... where the humuhumunukunukuāpuaʻa go swimming by ..." It is also featured prominently in the Disney Channel Original Movie High School Musical 2 with a song of the same name. In "Hawaii – Here We Come", the fourth episode of Top Cat, Benny reads a brochure about his upcoming Hawaiian vacation and asks Top Cat, "What's a humma-humma-nooka-nooka-apu-ah-ah?" It is also mentioned in Mortal Kombat 11 by the Joker as an insult to Scorpion regarding his color scheme. An episode of Octonauts also included an episode with the fish as focus, named "The Humuhumunukunukuapua'a". The fish was mentioned in Toy Story Toons: Hawaiian Vacation.

== See also ==
- Lagoon triggerfish
