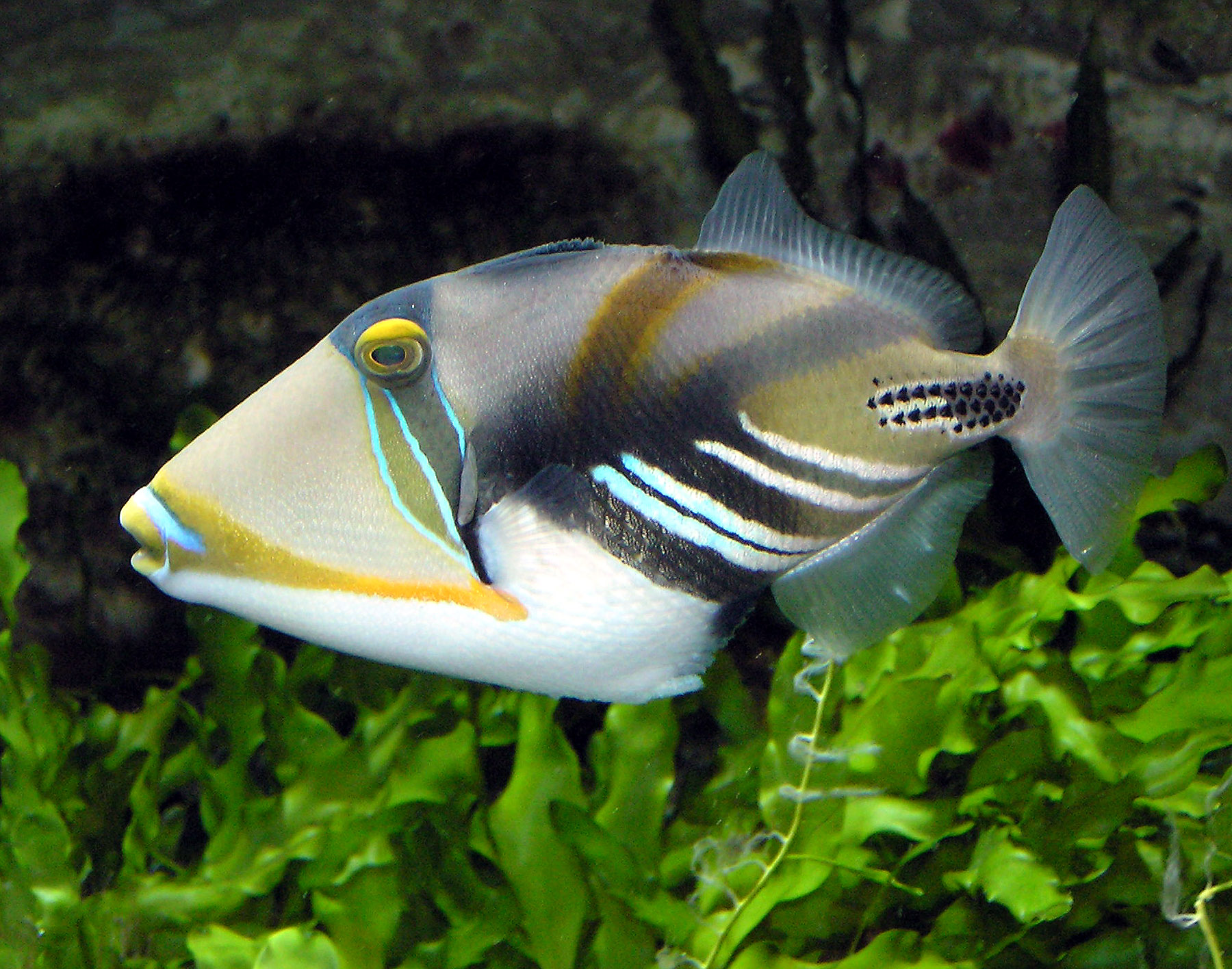

Conservation status
- Least Concern (IUCN 3.1)

Scientific classification
- Kingdom: Animalia
- Phylum: Chordata
- Class: Actinopterygii
- Division: Teleostei
- Order: Tetraodontiformes
- Family: Balistidae
- Genus: Rhinecanthus
- Species: R. aculeatus

Binomial name
- Rhinecanthus aculeatus (Linnaeus, 1758)

= Lagoon triggerfish =

Species of fish found in the Indo-Pacific region

The lagoon triggerfish (Rhinecanthus aculeatus), also known as the blackbar triggerfish, the Picasso triggerfish, or the Picassofish, is a triggerfish, up to 30 cm (12 in) in length, found on reefs in the Indo-Pacific region.

This species has been studied in a range of research contexts, from locomotion to color vision research.

== Behavior ==
Lagoon triggerfish live in the reefs and sandy areas of coral reefs, where they eat just about anything that comes along, mostly including invertebrates and reef algae. They are always restlessly swimming around and vigorously protect their territory against intruders, including divers, especially when guarding their eggs during reproduction season. Their relatively small size makes them much less dangerous than the larger titan triggerfish of the same family.

The fish moves through the water by using waving motions in its dorsal and anal fins, allowing it to move more precisely. Using these movements, it can move forwards, backwards or simply hover in place above the reef. This means that it can more easily back out of crevices than other unidirectional fish.

== Reproduction ==
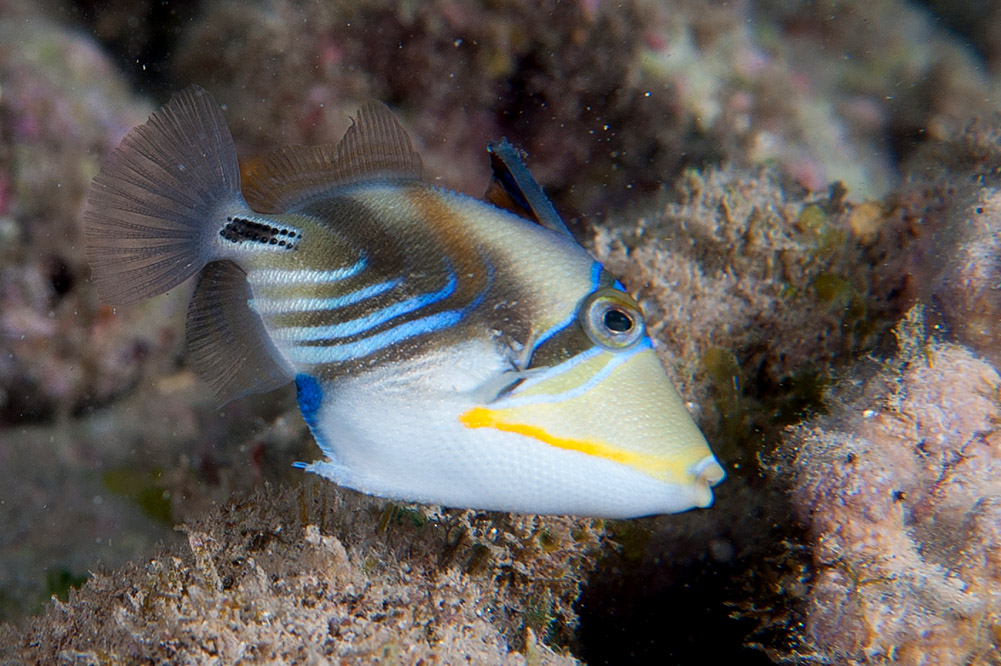
Juvenile

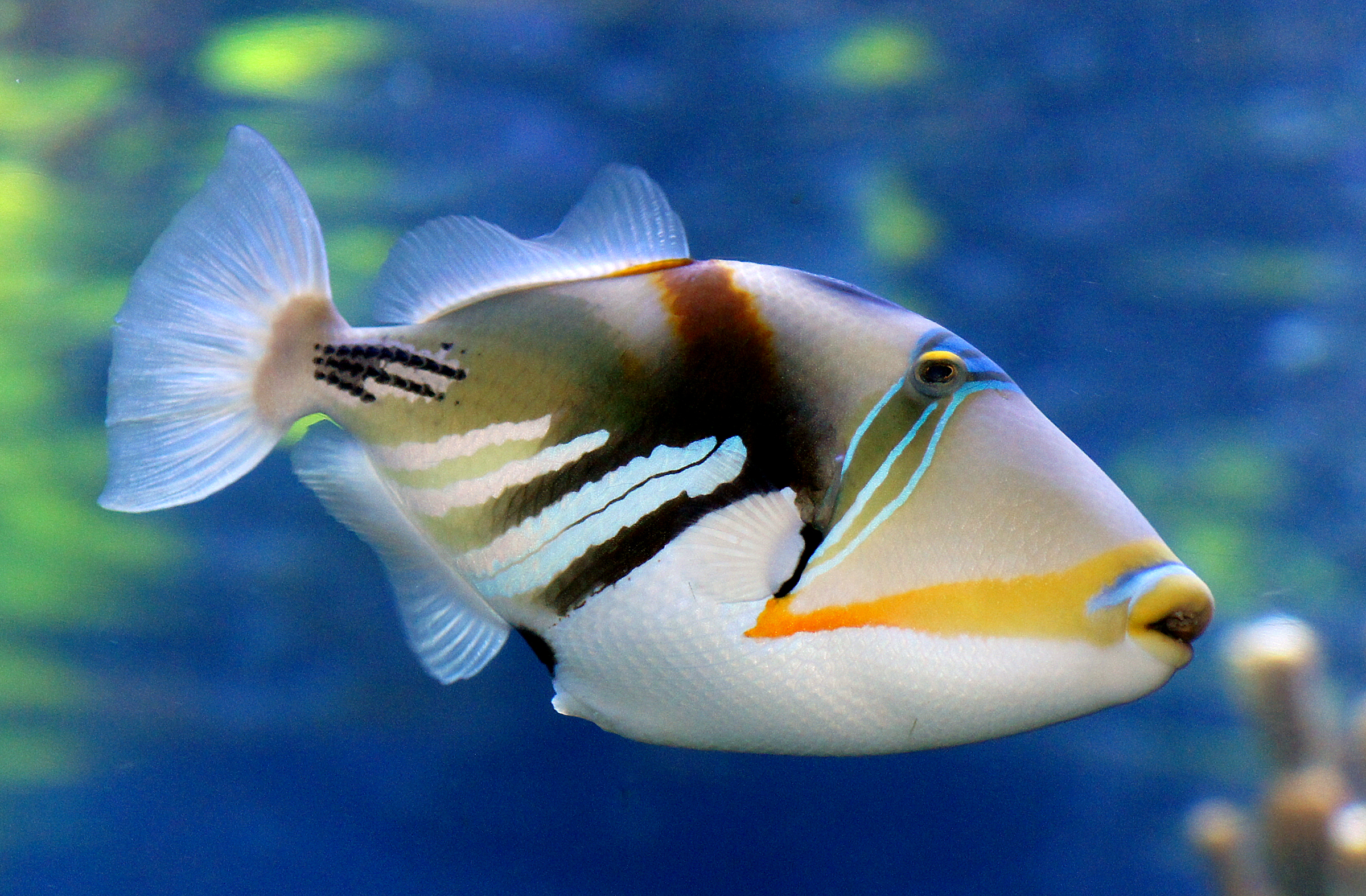
Adult

Both sexes guard territories, some maintaining a territory for eight years or longer (with males holding territories for significantly longer than females). A typical male territory may overlap with one to five female territories, and their mating system is described as haremic, although not much is known about this (similar mating systems are seen in other Balistidae species). If a male or female is removed or disappears their territories are soon taken over by a new fish. They reproduce multiple times over their lifetimes.

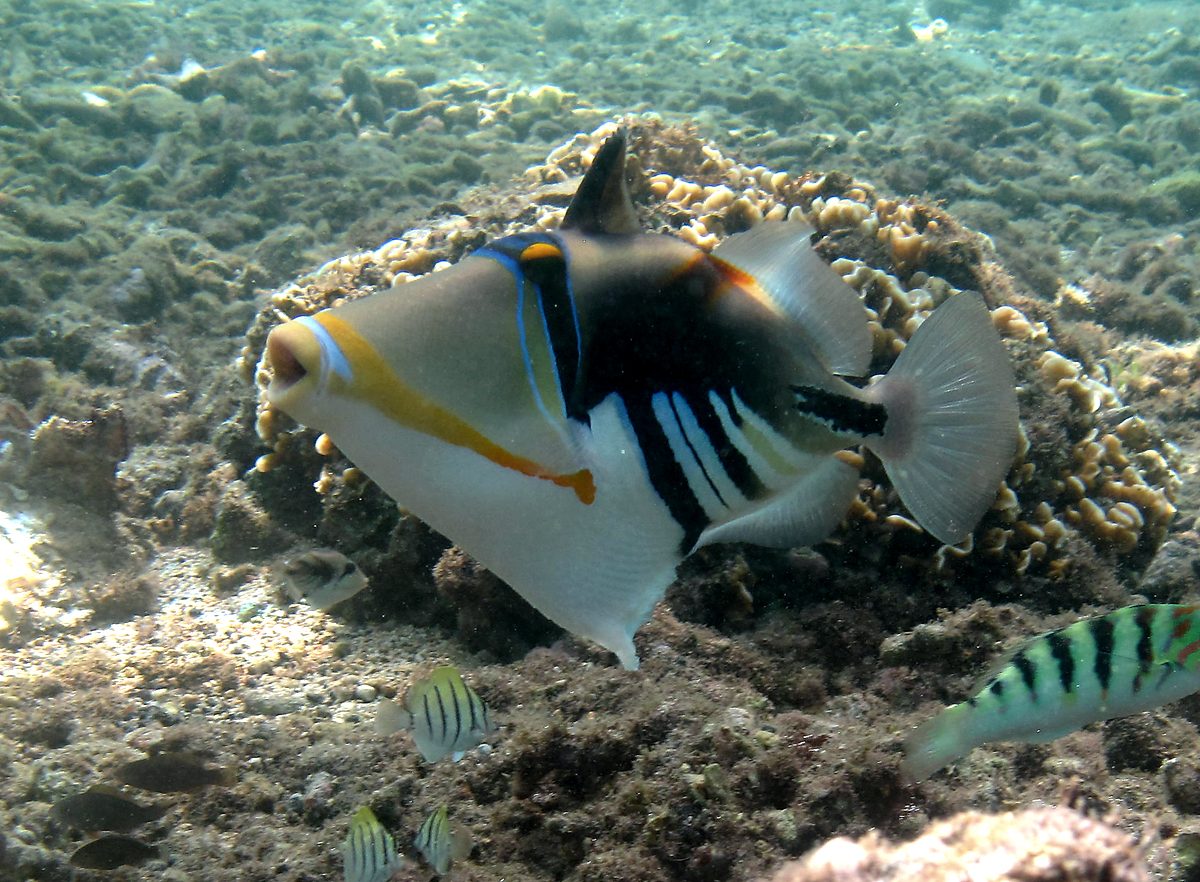
With raised dorsal and pelvic spines, at Réunion

Pair-spawning takes place around sunrise, with the egg masses being attached to sand, coral rubble or algae. They hatch on the same day around sunset. Although paternal care is normal in teleost fishes with external fertilization, it is the mothers in this species that guard and care for eggs until they hatch. The mother remains above the eggs for about 12–14 hours, fanning the eggs with her pectoral fins to improve aeration for perhaps 30% of the time. She chases away most fish that approach and remove other intruders like starfish by mouth. Maternal care is effective in preventing predation, and experimental removal of the mothers reduced survival to almost nothing suggesting this behaviour is adaptive. Unlike fathers, mothers forage less and over a smaller area near the egg mass while caring for the eggs. Since the males have multiple mates, caring for an egg mass would probably be more costly in terms of lost mating opportunities so maternal care is considered to be an evolutionarily stable strategy.

== Vision ==
This species has one type of single cone (SC), with an opsin peaking in sensitivity at 413 nm (S), and a double cone with two different opsins in each member peaking at 480 nm (M) and 530 nm (L) respectively. Behavioural research has provided evidence that individual members of the double cones can act as independent channels of colour information, aiding in understanding double cone function. This research suggests the species has trichromatic vision, like humans.

== See also ==
- Reef triggerfish
