= Anachis rhodae =

Scientific classification
- Kingdom: Animalia
- Phylum: Mollusca
- Class: Gastropoda
- Subclass: Caenogastropoda
- Order: Neogastropoda
- Family: Columbellidae
- Genus: Anachis
- Species: A. rhodae

Binomial name
- Anachis rhodae Radwin, 1968

Synonyms
- Anachis (Parvanachis) rhodae Radwin, 1968 alternative representation

Species of gastropod

Anachis rhodae is a species of sea snail in the family Columbellidae, the dove snails.

== Description ==
The length of the shell attains 7.7 mm, its diameter 3.2 mm.

== Distribution ==
This species occurs in the Caribbean Sea off the Dominican Republic.
