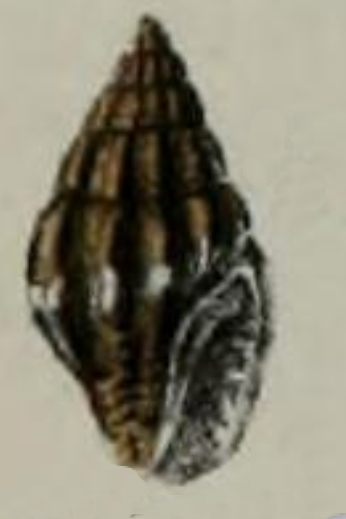
- Shell of Anachis nigricostata (holotype)

Scientific classification
- Kingdom: Animalia
- Phylum: Mollusca
- Class: Gastropoda
- Subclass: Caenogastropoda
- Order: Neogastropoda
- Family: Columbellidae
- Genus: Anachis
- Species: A. nigricostata

Binomial name
- Anachis nigricostata (E. A. Smith, 1879)

Synonyms
- Anachis miser nigricostata (E. A. Smith, 1879) superseded combination; Columbella (Anachis) nigricostata E. A. Smith, 1879 superseded combination; Columbella nigricostata E. A. Smith, 1879 superseded combination

= Anachis nigricostata =

Species of gastropod

Anachis nigricostata is a species of sea snail in the family Columbellidae, the dove snails.

== Description ==
The length of the shell attains 12.5 mm, its diameter 6 mm.

(Original description) The shell is acuminately ovate and subturreted. Beneath a thin, dirty yellowish epidermis, it appears white with black ribs. A series of white spots dots the ribs a little above the middle of the body whorl, and a black, elongate spot or line fills each interstice between the ribs. Those spots towards the outer lip extend downwards to the base in a rather zigzag manner.

The 8 whorls are a little convex, and each features about 12 thinnish ribs. The body whorl is a little flattened or even concave at its broadest part. The ribs in front extend somewhat below the middle, and on the back, the four or five nearest the lip develop only a short distance from the suture, leaving the whorl below them smooth. At the base, it is transversely grooved, with the eight or nine ridges or lirae between the sulci being spotted with black. These spots are the continuation of the longitudinal costae's coloring.

The aperture is small, narrow, and bluish-white within. The outer lip is exteriorly thickened, thin at the edge, and bears about 8 internal tubercles, of which the three or four upper ones are the largest. The columella is suberect, slightly convex at the middle, covered with a thin callosity, and has a free margin. Through this margin, the transverse ridges that wind around the end or cauda of the whorl appear somewhat in the form of nodules.

== Distribution ==
This species occurs in Bay of Bengal off the Andaman and Nicobar Islands.
