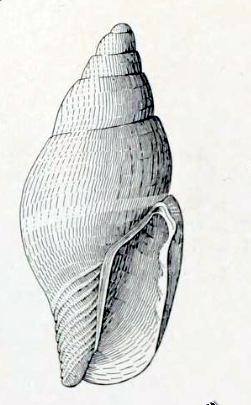
- Shell of Anachis lurida (holotype)

Scientific classification
- Kingdom: Animalia
- Phylum: Mollusca
- Class: Gastropoda
- Subclass: Caenogastropoda
- Order: Neogastropoda
- Family: Columbellidae
- Genus: Anachis
- Species: A. lurida

Binomial name
- Anachis lurida (Hedley, 1907)

Synonyms
- Pyrene lurida Hedley, 1907 superseded combination; Pyreneola lurida (Hedley, 1907)

= Anachis lurida =

Species of gastropod

Anachis lurida is a species of sea snail in the family Columbellidae, the dove snails.

== Description ==
The length of the shell attains 3.4 mm, its diameter 1.5 mm.

(Original description) The shell is small, oval, thin, semitransparent, and glossy. It features five slightly shouldered whorls. The color is uniform, a clear cinnamon-brown, adorned with a pale, narrow, peripheral zone.

Sculpture: the anterior extremity is wound with ten small spiral cords. The remainder at first appears smooth, but under high magnification, it is found to have minute spiral striae that are reticulated by delicate growth-lines. The aperture is oblong, and the outer lip is thickened externally and possesses three tubercles internally. The columella is smooth and straight.

== Distribution ==
This marine species is endemic to Australia and occurs off New South Wales and Queensland.
