= Anachis delapsarbocola =

Scientific classification
- Kingdom: Animalia
- Phylum: Mollusca
- Class: Gastropoda
- Subclass: Caenogastropoda
- Order: Neogastropoda
- Family: Columbellidae
- Genus: Anachis
- Species: A. delapsarbocola

Binomial name
- Anachis delapsarbocola K. Monsecour & Chino, 2025

Species of gastropod

Anachis delapsarbocola is a species of sea snail in the family Columbellidae, the dove snails.

== Distribution ==
This marine species occurs in the South China Sea off Taiwan.
