= Anachis lillianae =

Scientific classification
- Kingdom: Animalia
- Phylum: Mollusca
- Class: Gastropoda
- Subclass: Caenogastropoda
- Order: Neogastropoda
- Family: Columbellidae
- Genus: Anachis
- Species: A. lillianae

Binomial name
- Anachis lillianae Whitney, 1978

Species of gastropod

Anachis lillianae is a species of sea snail in the family Columbellidae, the dove snails.

== Distribution ==
This marine species occurs off Baja California peninsula, Mexico.
