= Anachis demanorum =

Scientific classification
- Kingdom: Animalia
- Phylum: Mollusca
- Class: Gastropoda
- Subclass: Caenogastropoda
- Order: Neogastropoda
- Family: Columbellidae
- Genus: Anachis
- Species: A. demanorum

Binomial name
- Anachis demanorum De Jong & Coomans, 1988

Synonyms
- Anachis demani De Jong & Coomans, 1988

Species of gastropod

Anachis demanorum is a species of sea snail in the family Columbellidae, the dove snails.

== Description ==
The length of the shell attains 4.5 mm, its diameter 1.6 mm.

== Distribution ==
This marine species occurs in the Caribbean Sea off Aruba.
