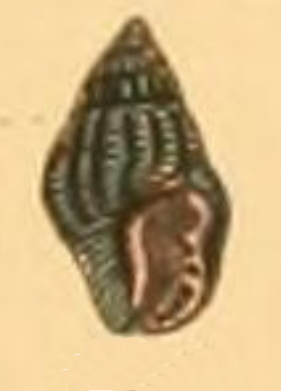
- Shell of Anachis atramentaria (holotype)

Scientific classification
- Kingdom: Animalia
- Phylum: Mollusca
- Class: Gastropoda
- Subclass: Caenogastropoda
- Order: Neogastropoda
- Family: Columbellidae
- Genus: Anachis
- Species: A. atramentaria

Binomial name
- Anachis atramentaria (G. B. Sowerby I, 1844)

Synonyms
- Colombella pariolida Duclos, 1840; Columbella atramentaria G. B. Sowerby I, 1844

= Anachis atramentaria =

Species of gastropod

Anachis atramentaria is a species of sea snail in the family Columbellidae, the dove snails.

== Description ==
(Original description) The shell is ovate, acuminated, thick, and ventricose in the middle. It is transversely striated and black. It comprises 5 to 6 whorls, which feature fine longitudinal ribs. The aperture is broad, and the outer lip is thickened, with rather inconspicuous small denticles within.

== Distribution ==
This species occurs of the Galápagos Islands.
