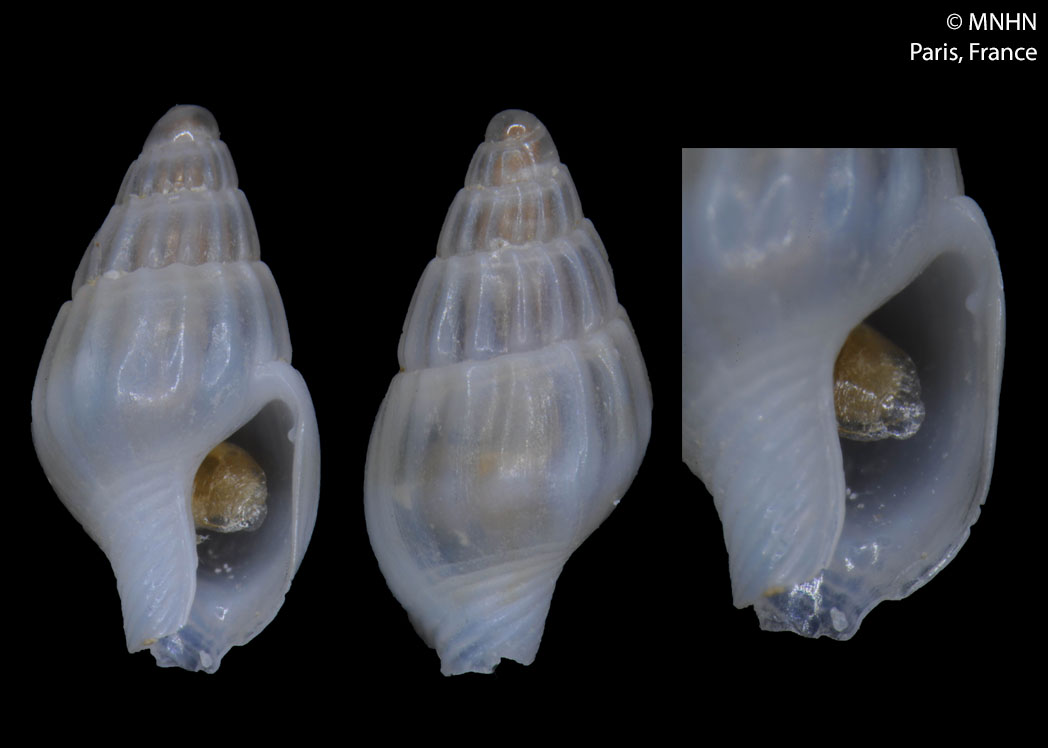
- Shell of Anachis incisa (holotype at MNHN, Paris)

Scientific classification
- Kingdom: Animalia
- Phylum: Mollusca
- Class: Gastropoda
- Subclass: Caenogastropoda
- Order: Neogastropoda
- Family: Columbellidae
- Genus: Anachis
- Species: A. incisa

Binomial name
- Anachis incisa K. Monsecour & D. Monsecour, 2016

= Anachis incisa =

Species of gastropod

Anachis incisa is a species of deep water sea snail belonging to family Columbellidae, commonly known as dove snails.

== Description ==
The length of the shell attains 4.5 mm.

== Distribution ==
This species occurs off New Caledonia at depths between 516 m and 613 m.
