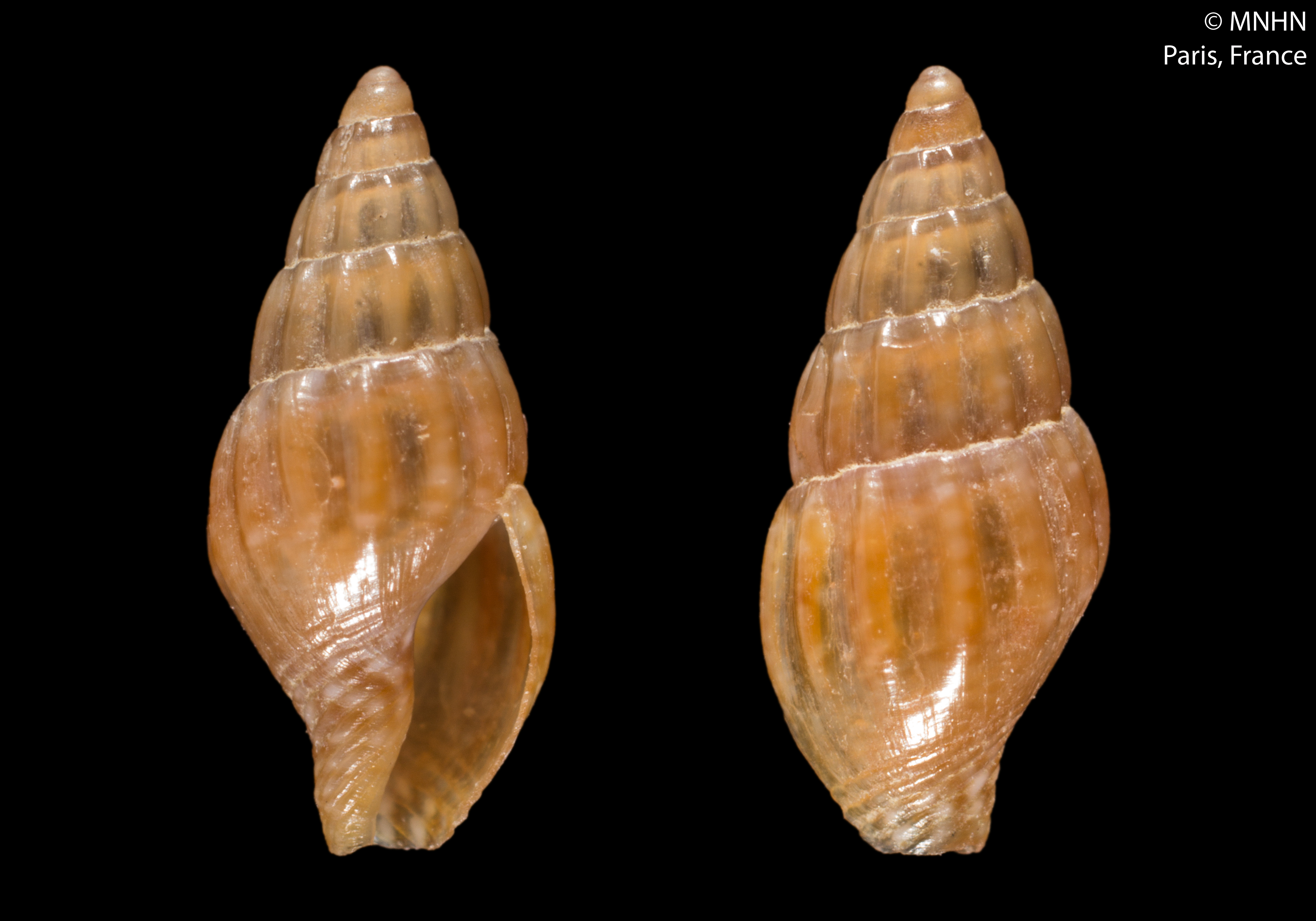
- Shell of Anachis avaroides (syntype at MNHN? Paris)

Scientific classification
- Kingdom: Animalia
- Phylum: Mollusca
- Class: Gastropoda
- Subclass: Caenogastropoda
- Order: Neogastropoda
- Family: Columbellidae
- Genus: Anachis
- Species: A. avaroides

Binomial name
- Anachis avaroides Nordsieck, 1975

= Anachis avaroides =

Species of gastropod

Anachis avaroides is a species of sea snail in the family Columbellidae, the dove snails.
