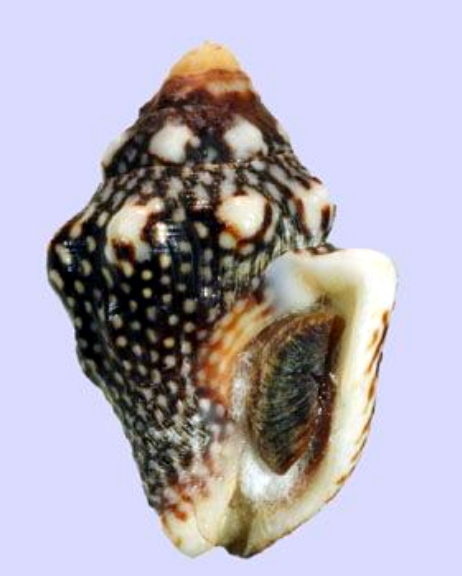
- Shell of Anachis boivini (specimen at the Natural History Museum Rotterdam)

Scientific classification
- Kingdom: Animalia
- Phylum: Mollusca
- Class: Gastropoda
- Subclass: Caenogastropoda
- Order: Neogastropoda
- Family: Columbellidae
- Genus: Anachis
- Species: A. boivini

Binomial name
- Anachis boivini (Kiener, 1841)

Synonyms
- Columbella boivini Kiener, 1841 (original combination)

= Anachis boivini =

Species of gastropod

Anachis boivini is a species of sea snail in the family Columbellidae, the dove snails.

== Description ==
(Original description in French) The shell is short, oval, bulging (ventricose), purpuriform, and attenuated at both ends. The spire is long, conical, and pointed; it has six or seven convex, angular, stepped whorls, crowned by pointed tubercles that, on the body whorl, extend into small longitudinal ribs. This body whorl is broad, bulging, and angular; it narrows at its base, where five or six transverse grooves are discernible.

The aperture is oval, attenuated at both ends, ending in a small, weakly notched siphonal canal. The outer lip is thick, broadly swollen in the middle, and covered with rather strong denticulations. The columella is smooth, arched, and coated with a thin layer of vitreous deposit. The color of this shell is blackish, with white and yellow spots on the tubercles; the other parts are covered with small, irregular yellow dots; the edges of the aperture are slightly tinted with red.

== Distribution ==
This species occurs in the Pacific Ocean off Costa Rica and Panama.
