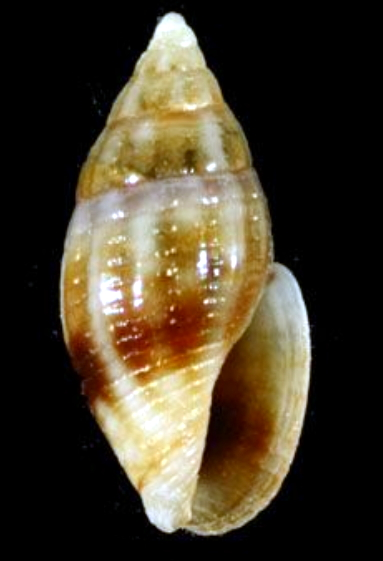
- Shell of Anachis reedi (specimen at the Natural History Museum, Rotterdam)

Scientific classification
- Kingdom: Animalia
- Phylum: Mollusca
- Class: Gastropoda
- Subclass: Caenogastropoda
- Order: Neogastropoda
- Family: Columbellidae
- Genus: Anachis
- Species: A. reedi

Binomial name
- Anachis reedi Bartsch, 1928

= Anachis reedi =

Species of gastropod

Anachis reedi is a species of sea snail in the family Columbellidae, the dove snails.

== Description ==
The length of the shell attains 5.3 mm, its diameter 2.8 mm.

(Original description) The shell is small, broadly ovate, and flesh-colored, featuring a narrow zone of brown at the suture and a broad zone of much darker brown on the anterior third of the base. The posterior two-thirds display the same color as the zone anterior to the periphery. The interior of the aperture exhibits the same zonation, with the ground color being a little darker flesh-colored than the exterior.

The whorls of the protoconch are eroded. The other whorls are appressed at the summit, somewhat inflated, and well rounded. They are marked with feebly developed, low axial riblets which are merely indicated on the early whorls, and of which 20 are present on the body whorl. In addition to these axial ribs, fine, closely spaced incremental lines are present on the ribs as well as the spaces that separate them. The spiral sculpture consists of 5 strongly incised spiral lines which are most conspicuous in the intercostal spaces. The suture is feebly impressed.

The base is about twice as long as the space between the summit and the suture. The extreme posterior portion is marked by the feeble continuation of the axial ribs, and the entire surface is covered by closely spaced incremental lines. The spiral sculpture consists of 5 deeply incised continuous spiral lines on the posterior third which separate broad, low rounded spiral cords, and 13 strongly incised lines which separate 12 rather strong, well rounded spiral cords on the anterior two-thirds of the base. These cords grow consecutively weaker from the posterior anteriorly. The aperture is oval, and the outer lip is thick within, bearing 4 conspicuous denticles on its middle half. The inner lip and parietal wall are covered with a thick callus.

== Distribution ==
This species occurs in the Pacific Ocean off Ecuador.
