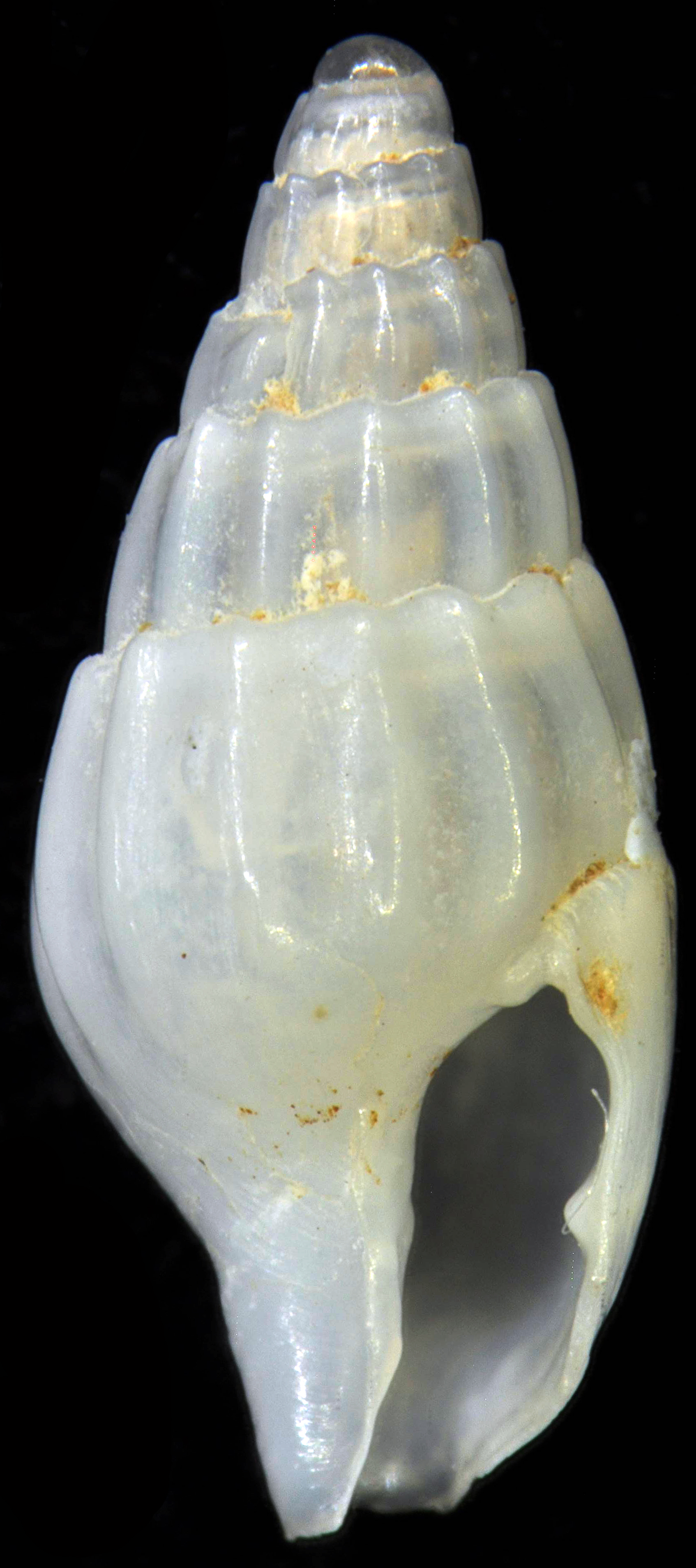
- Shell of Anachis unidens (paratype at MNHN, Paris)

Scientific classification
- Kingdom: Animalia
- Phylum: Mollusca
- Class: Gastropoda
- Subclass: Caenogastropoda
- Order: Neogastropoda
- Family: Columbellidae
- Genus: Anachis
- Species: A. unidens

Binomial name
- Anachis unidens Pelorce, 2020

= Anachis unidens =

Species of gastropod

Anachis unidens is a species of sea snail in the family Columbellidae, the dove snails.

== Description ==
The length of the shall attains 6.8 mm.

== Distribution ==
This species occurs off Guadeloupe, Caribbean Sea.
