= Anachis juani =

Scientific classification
- Kingdom: Animalia
- Phylum: Mollusca
- Class: Gastropoda
- Subclass: Caenogastropoda
- Order: Neogastropoda
- Family: Columbellidae
- Genus: Anachis
- Species: A. juani

Binomial name
- Anachis juani Horro & Rolán, 2010

Species of gastropod

Anachis juani is a species of sea snail in the family Columbellidae, the dove snails.

== Distribution ==
This species occurs in the Atlantic Ocean off Angola.
