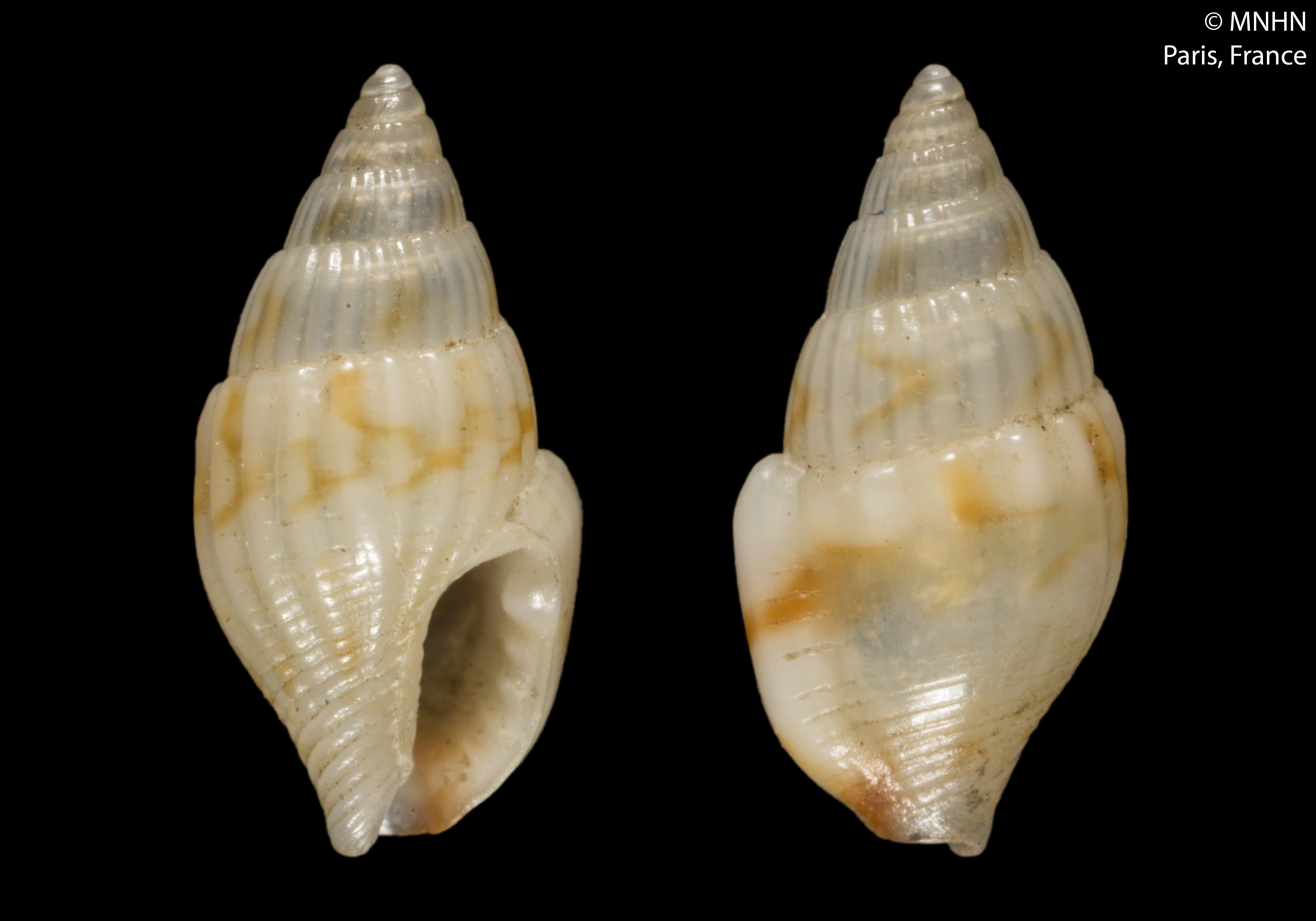
- Shell of Anachis oxillia (syntype at MNHN, Paris)

Scientific classification
- Kingdom: Animalia
- Phylum: Mollusca
- Class: Gastropoda
- Subclass: Caenogastropoda
- Order: Neogastropoda
- Family: Columbellidae
- Genus: Anachis
- Species: A. oxillia

Binomial name
- Anachis oxillia (Duclos, 1846)

Synonyms
- Colombella oxillia Duclos, 1846 (original combination)

= Anachis oxillia =

Species of gastropod

Anachis oxillia is a species of sea snail in the family Columbellidae, the dove snails.

== Description ==
The length of the shell attains 5.1 mm.

== Distribution ==
This species occurs in the Pacific Ocean off Panama.
