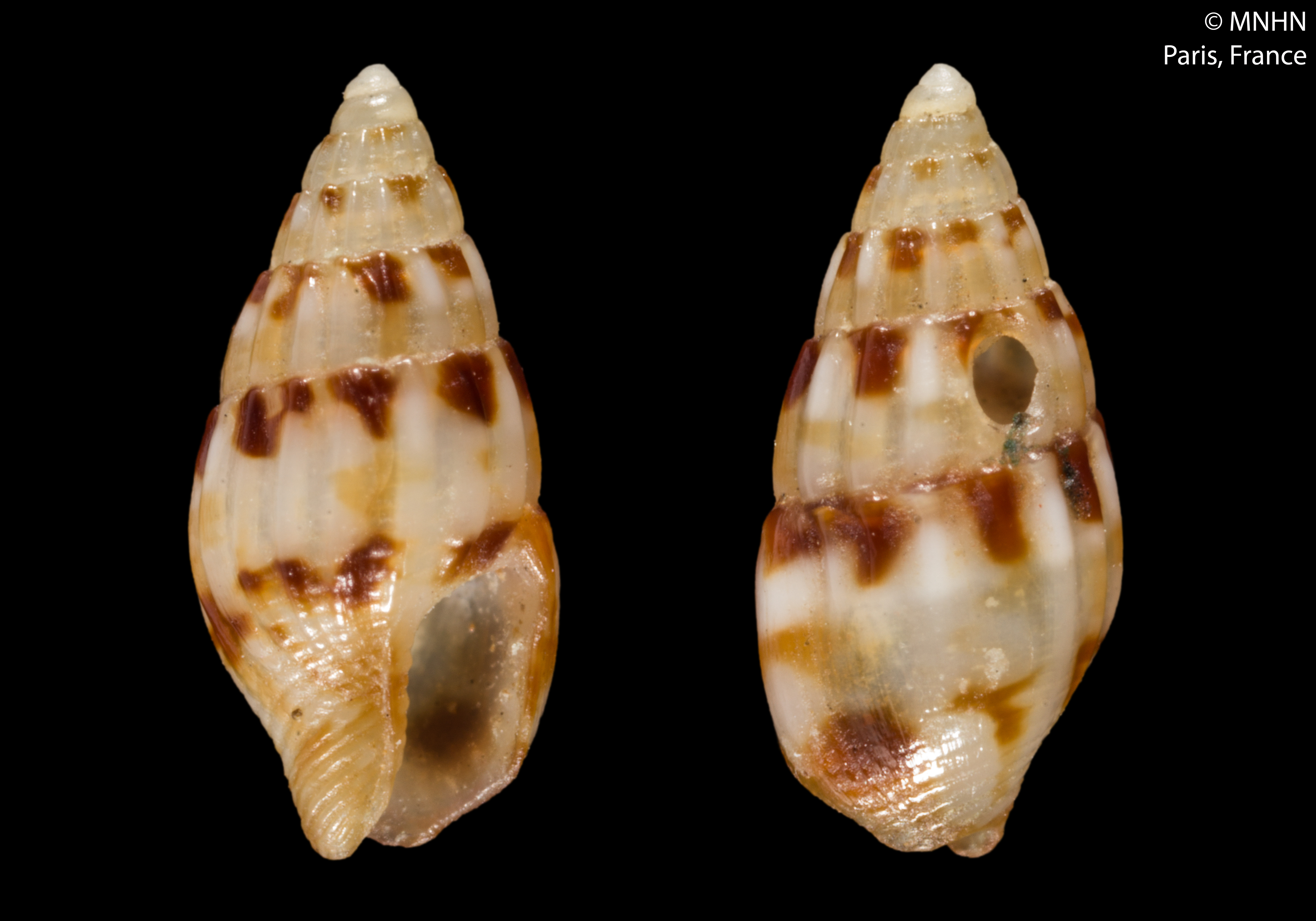
- Shell of Anachis nisitella (syntype at MNHN, Paris)

Scientific classification
- Kingdom: Animalia
- Phylum: Mollusca
- Class: Gastropoda
- Subclass: Caenogastropoda
- Order: Neogastropoda
- Family: Columbellidae
- Genus: Anachis
- Species: A. nisitella

Binomial name
- Anachis nisitella (Duclos, 1840)

Synonyms
- Colombella nisitella Duclos, 1840

= Anachis nisitella =

Species of gastropod

Anachis nisitella is a species of sea snail in the family Columbellidae, the dove snails.

== Description ==
The length of the shell attains 5 mm.

== Distribution ==
This species occurs in the Caribbean Sea off Martinique and Guadeloupe.
