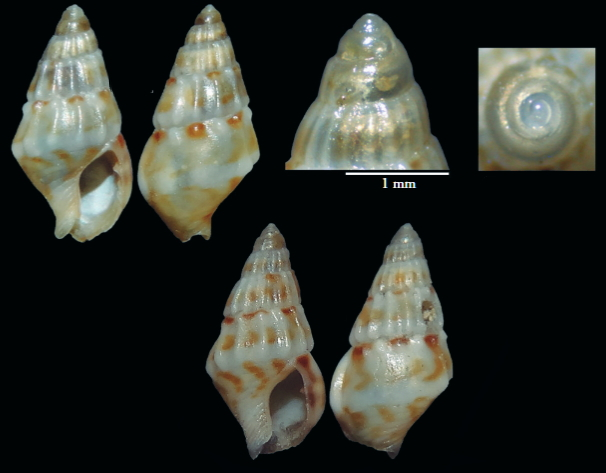
- Shell of Anachis mogolloni (holotype)

Scientific classification
- Kingdom: Animalia
- Phylum: Mollusca
- Class: Gastropoda
- Subclass: Caenogastropoda
- Order: Neogastropoda
- Family: Columbellidae
- Genus: Anachis
- Species: A. mogolloni

Binomial name
- Anachis mogolloni Arias Ávila, 2021

= Anachis mogolloni =

Species of gastropod

Anachis mogolloni is a species of sea snail in the family Columbellidae, the dove snails.

== Description ==
The length of the shell attains 4.8 mm, its diameter is 2.2 mm.

== Distribution ==
This species occurs in the Pacific Ocean off Peru.
