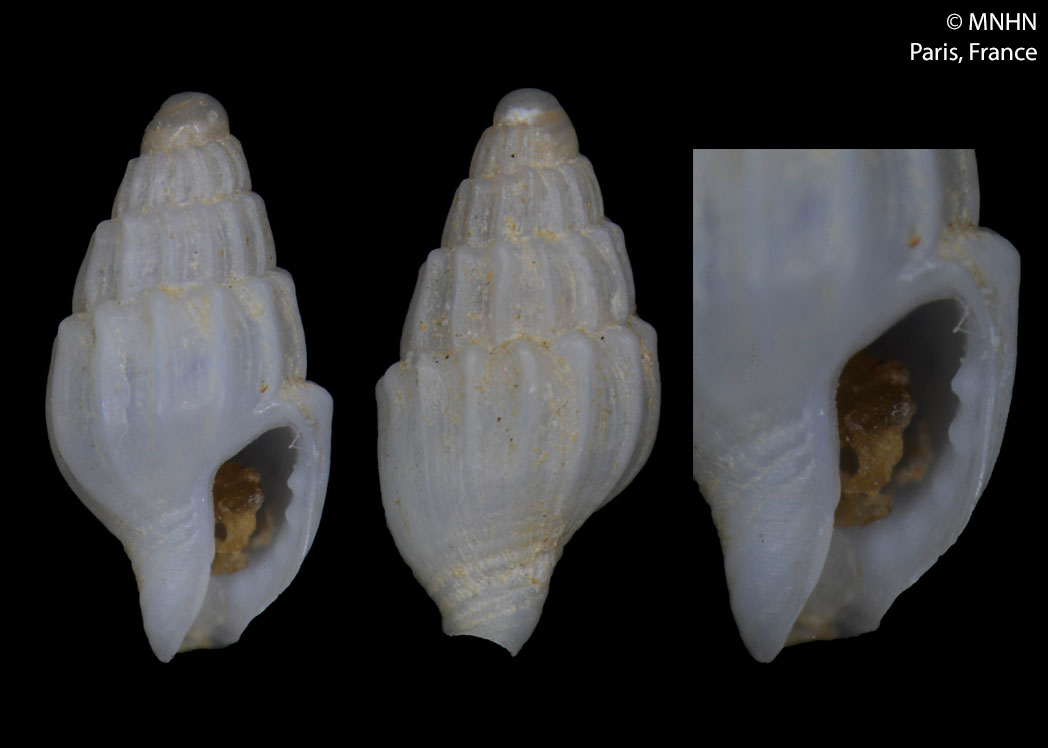
- Shell of Anachis facula (holotype at MNHN, Paris)

Scientific classification
- Kingdom: Animalia
- Phylum: Mollusca
- Class: Gastropoda
- Subclass: Caenogastropoda
- Order: Neogastropoda
- Family: Columbellidae
- Genus: Anachis
- Species: A. facula

Binomial name
- Anachis facula K. Monsecour & D. Monsecour, 2016

= Anachis facula =

Species of gastropod

Anachis facula is a species of sea snail in the family Columbellidae, the dove snails.

== Description ==
The length of the shell attains 3.6 mm.

== Distribution ==
This species occurs off New Caledonia at depths between 520 m and 570 m.
