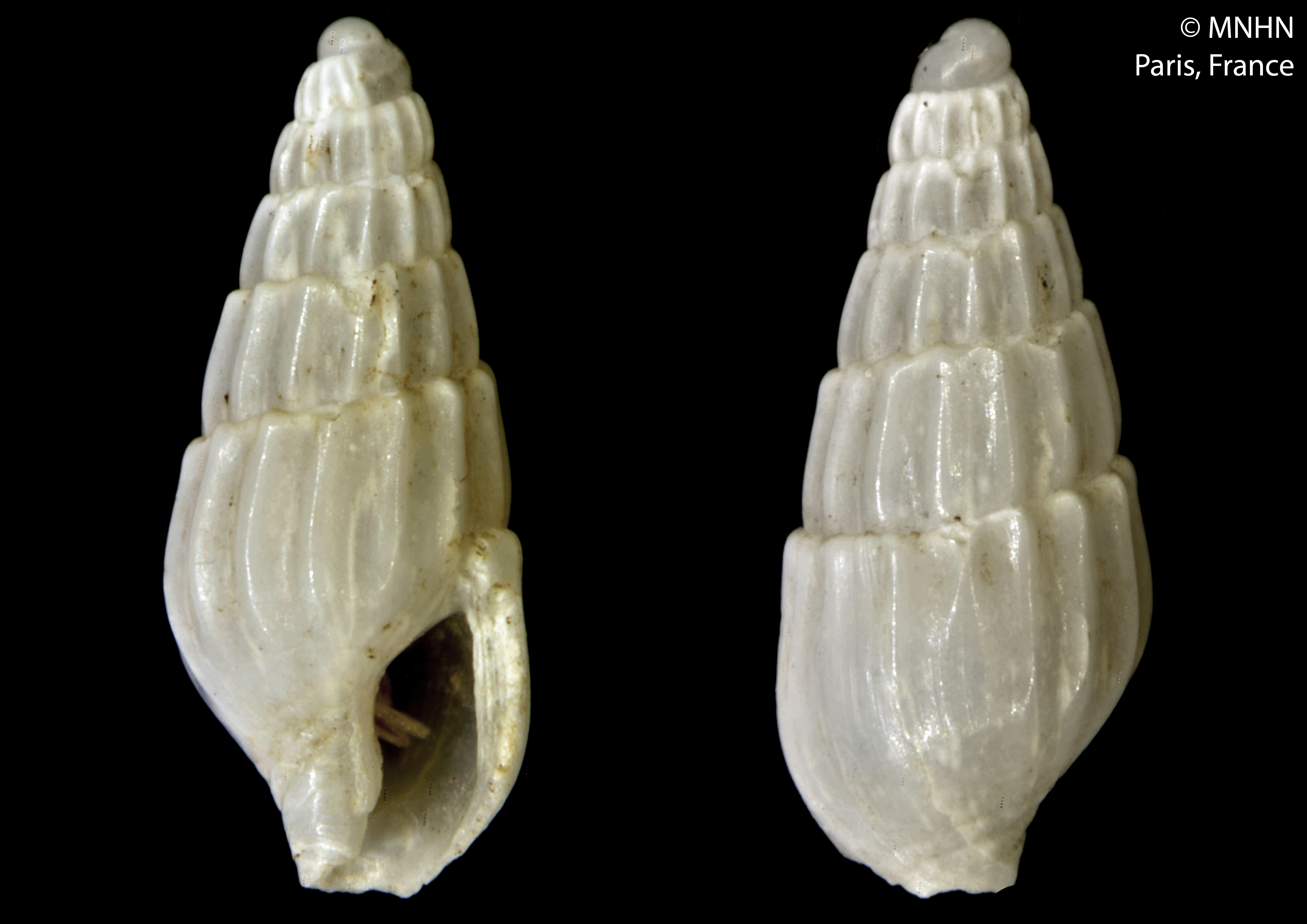
- Shell of Anachis inopinatus(holotype at MNHN, Paris)

Scientific classification
- Kingdom: Animalia
- Phylum: Mollusca
- Class: Gastropoda
- Subclass: Caenogastropoda
- Order: Neogastropoda
- Family: Columbellidae
- Genus: Anachis
- Species: A. inopinatus

Binomial name
- Anachis inopinatus K. Monsecour & D. Monsecour, 2018

= Anachis inopinatus =

Species of gastropod

Anachis inopinatus is a species of sea snail in the family Columbellidae, the dove snails.

== Description ==
The length of the shell attains 5.6 mm.

== Distribution ==
This species occurs off Tuamotu, French Polynesia.
