= Anachis jungi =

Scientific classification
- Kingdom: Animalia
- Phylum: Mollusca
- Class: Gastropoda
- Subclass: Caenogastropoda
- Order: Neogastropoda
- Family: Columbellidae
- Genus: Anachis
- Species: A. jungi

Binomial name
- Anachis jungi Faber, 2004

Species of gastropod

Anachis jungi is a species of sea snail in the family Columbellidae, the dove snails.
