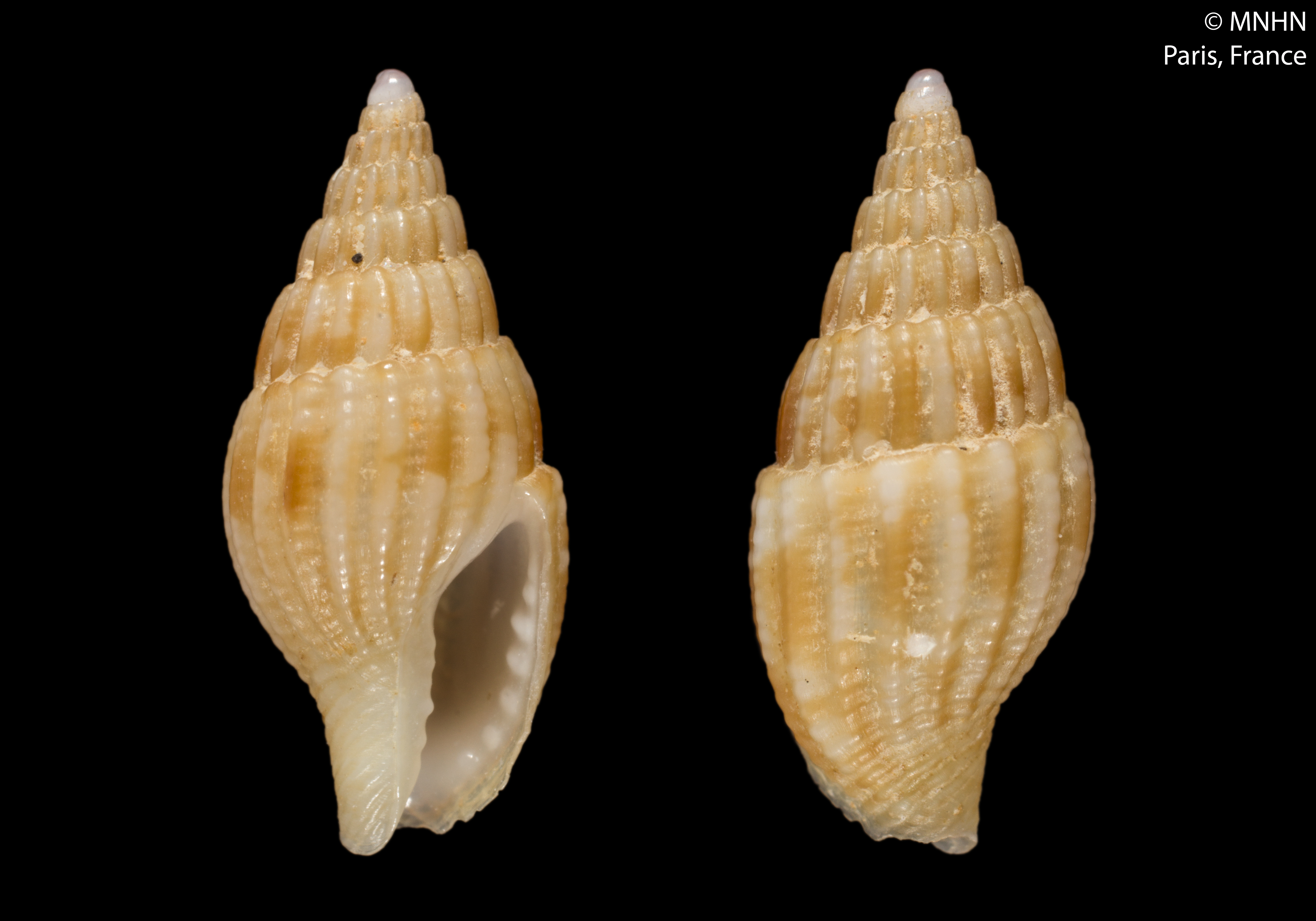
- Shell of Anachis roberti (holotype at MNHN? Paris)

Scientific classification
- Kingdom: Animalia
- Phylum: Mollusca
- Class: Gastropoda
- Subclass: Caenogastropoda
- Order: Neogastropoda
- Family: Columbellidae
- Genus: Anachis
- Species: A. roberti

Binomial name
- Anachis roberti Monsecour & Monsecour, 2006

Synonyms
- Anachis (Costoanachis) roberti D. Monsecour & K. Monsecour, 2006

= Anachis roberti =

Species of gastropod

Anachis roberti is a species of sea snail in the family Columbellidae, the dove snails.

== Description ==
The length of the shell attains 11.6 mm.

== Distribution ==
This marine species occurs in the Caribbean Sea off Guadeloupe.
