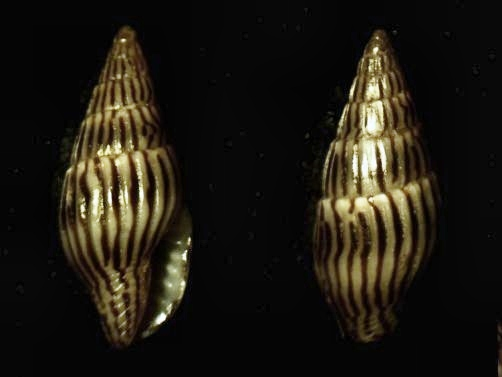
- Apertural view of a shell of Anachis valledori

Scientific classification
- Kingdom: Animalia
- Phylum: Mollusca
- Class: Gastropoda
- Subclass: Caenogastropoda
- Order: Neogastropoda
- Family: Columbellidae
- Genus: Anachis
- Species: A. valledori

Binomial name
- Anachis valledori Rolán & Luque, 2002

Synonyms
- Columbella sagra Orbigny, A.V.M.D. d', 1853; Mitrella hidalgoi auct.non Monterosato, T.A. de M. di, 1889

= Anachis valledori =

Species of gastropod

Anachis valledori is a species of sea snail in the family Columbellidae, the dove snails.

== Description ==
The shell grows to a length of 8.3 mm.

== Distribution ==
This species occurs in the Atlantic Ocean off the Cape Verdes.
