= Anachis treva =

Scientific classification
- Kingdom: Animalia
- Phylum: Mollusca
- Class: Gastropoda
- Subclass: Caenogastropoda
- Order: Neogastropoda
- Family: Columbellidae
- Genus: Anachis
- Species: A. treva

Binomial name
- Anachis treva (F. Baker, G. D. Hanna & A. M. Strong, 1938

Species of gastropod

Anachis treva is a species of sea snail in the family Columbellidae, the dove snails.

== Distribution ==
This species is found in the Pacific Ocean off Mexico.
