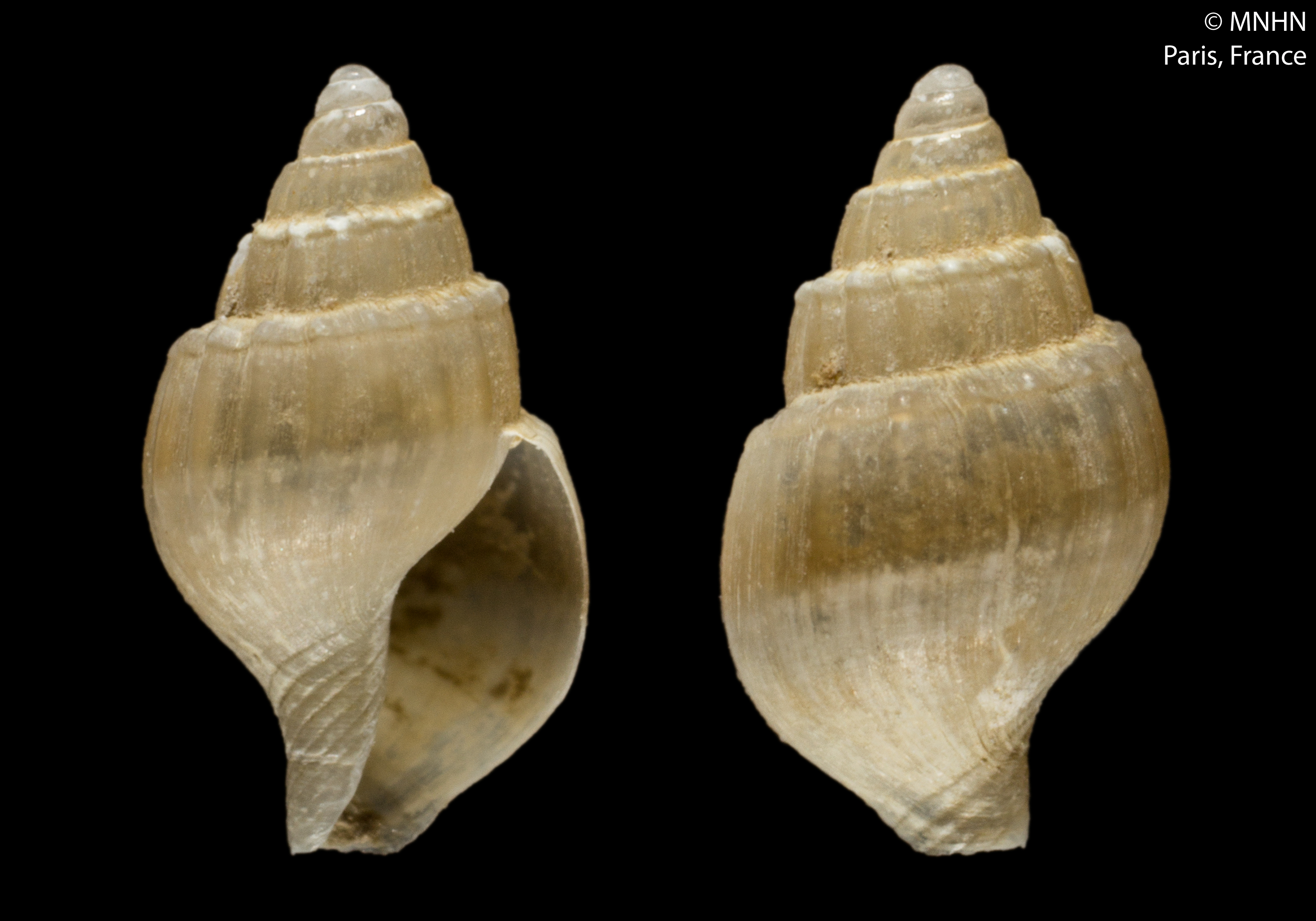
- Shell of Anachis profunda (holotype at MNHN, Paris)

Scientific classification
- Kingdom: Animalia
- Phylum: Mollusca
- Class: Gastropoda
- Subclass: Caenogastropoda
- Order: Neogastropoda
- Family: Columbellidae
- Genus: Anachis
- Species: A. profunda

Binomial name
- Anachis profunda Pelorce, 2017

= Anachis profunda =

Species of gastropod

Anachis profunda is a species of sea snail in the family Columbellidae, the dove snails.

== Description ==
The length of the shell attains 4.5 mm.

== Distribution ==
This species occurs in the Caribbean Sea off French Guiana.
