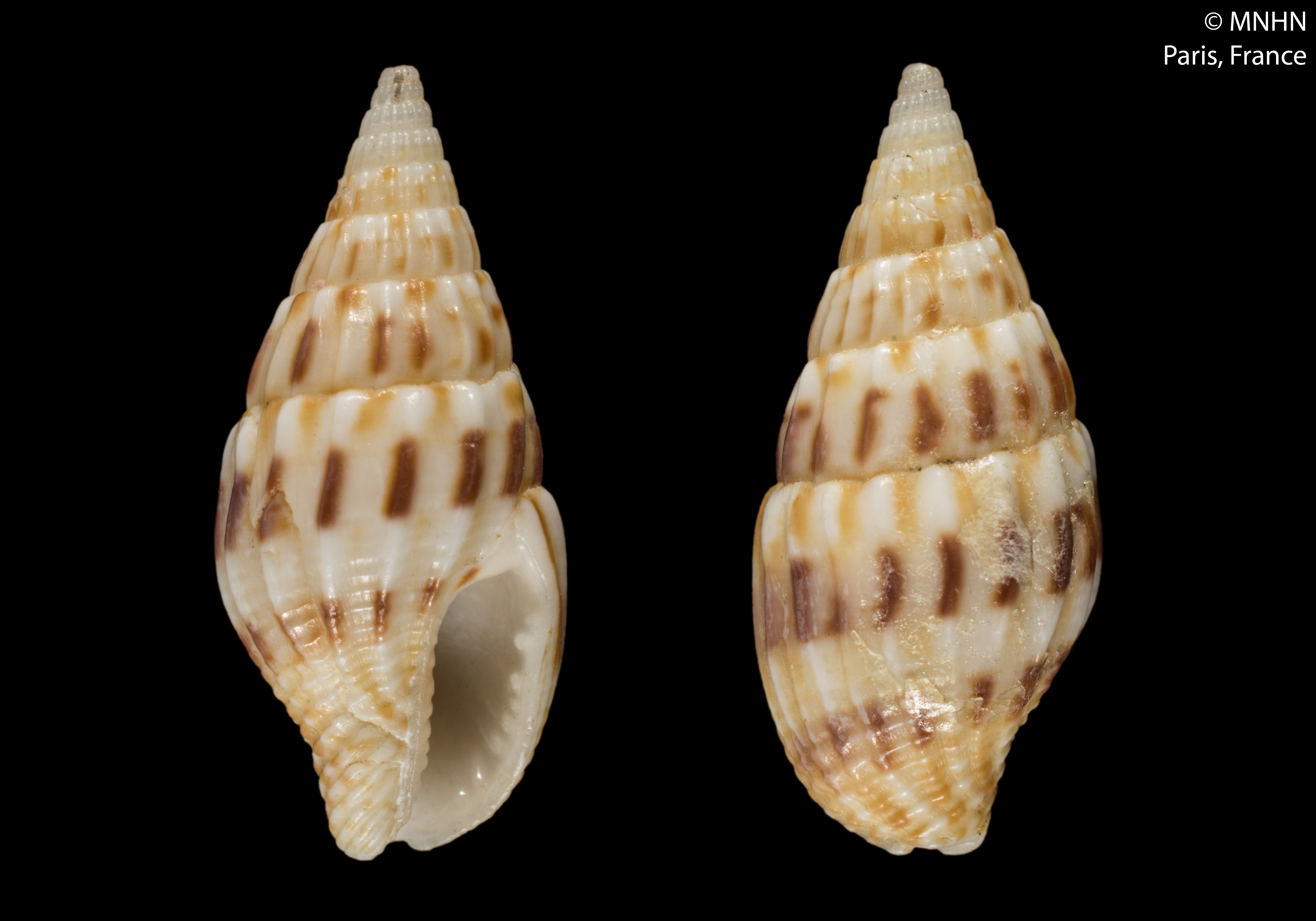
- Shell of Anachis lyrata (syntype at MNHN, Paris)

Scientific classification
- Kingdom: Animalia
- Phylum: Mollusca
- Class: Gastropoda
- Subclass: Caenogastropoda
- Order: Neogastropoda
- Family: Columbellidae
- Genus: Anachis
- Species: A. lyrata

Binomial name
- Anachis lyrata (G. B. Sowerby I, 1832)

Synonyms
- Columbella lyrata G. B. Sowerby I, 1832 (original combination)

= Anachis lyrata =

Species of gastropod

Anachis lyrata is a species of sea snail in the family Columbellidae, the dove snails.

== Description ==
The length of the shell attains 3.4 mm, its diameter 1.5 mm.

(Original description in Latin) The shell is oblong and acuminated (pointed), appearing whitish and covered with a dusky epidermis. It has 10 whorls, which are longitudinally ribbed, with the ribs being black below. The body whorl is spirally striated below and longitudinally ribbed above, with the ribs being black-articulated. The aperture is oblong, rather short, and constricted in the middle, with the outer lip being denticulate inside.

== Distribution ==
This marine species occurs off Panama, Costa Rica, Colombia and French Guiana; also off Brazil.
