= Anachis donnae =

Scientific classification
- Kingdom: Animalia
- Phylum: Mollusca
- Class: Gastropoda
- Subclass: Caenogastropoda
- Order: Neogastropoda
- Family: Columbellidae
- Genus: Anachis
- Species: A. donnae

Binomial name
- Anachis donnae Moolenbeek & Dance, 1994

Species of gastropod

Anachis donnae is a species of sea snail in the family Columbellidae, the dove snails.

== Distribution ==
This marine species occurs off Oman.
