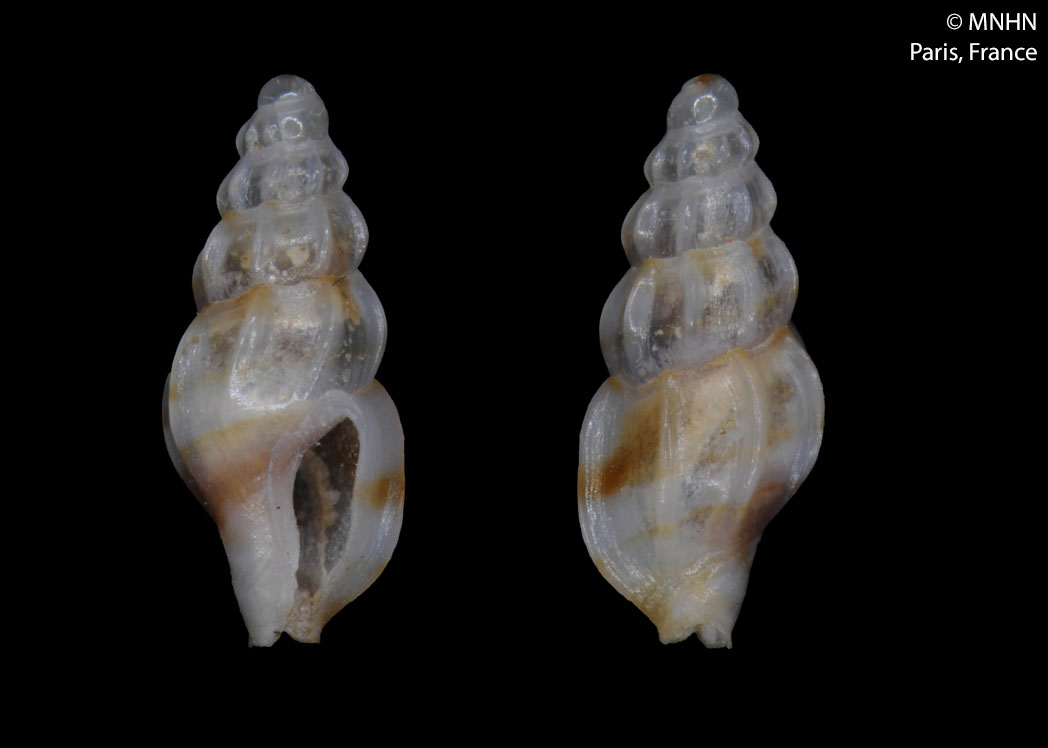
- Shell of Anachis constrictocanalis (holotype at MNHN, Paris)

Scientific classification
- Kingdom: Animalia
- Phylum: Mollusca
- Class: Gastropoda
- Subclass: Caenogastropoda
- Order: Neogastropoda
- Family: Columbellidae
- Genus: Anachis
- Species: A. constrictocanalis

Binomial name
- Anachis constrictocanalis K. Monsecour & D. Monsecour, 2016

= Anachis constrictocanalis =

Species of gastropod

Anachis constrictocanalis is a species of sea snail in the family Columbellidae, the dove snails.

== Description ==
The length of the shell attains 4.1 mm.

== Distribution ==
This species occurs off New Caledonia at depths between 310 m and 601 m.
