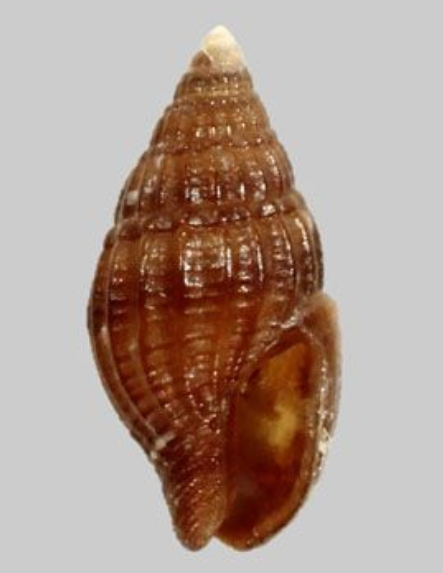
- Shell of Anachis milium (specimen at the Natural History Museum Rotterdam)

Scientific classification
- Kingdom: Animalia
- Phylum: Mollusca
- Class: Gastropoda
- Subclass: Caenogastropoda
- Order: Neogastropoda
- Family: Columbellidae
- Genus: Anachis
- Species: A. milium

Binomial name
- Anachis milium (Dall, 1916)

Synonyms
- Columbella (Anachis) milium Dall, 1916 superseded combination; Columbella milium Dall, 1916 superseded combination; Columbella parva G. B. Sowerby I, 1844 (Invalid: treated by Dall as a secondary homonym of Buccinum parvum H.C. Lea, 1841; Columbella milium is a replacement name)

= Anachis milium =

Species of gastropod

Anachis milium is a species of sea snail in the family Columbellidae, the dove snails.

== Description ==
The length of the shell attains 5.2 mm.

(Original description as Columbella parva) The shell is oblong and pale, marked with a single spiral chestnut-colored band. Its apex is acuminated, and its 6 whorls are longitudinally ribbed and cross-striated. The body whorl appears smooth anteriorly near the outer variciform lip. The aperture is rather short and somewhat sinuous, and the columellar lip is raised.

== Distribution ==
This species occurs off the Baja California, Mexico and in the Pacific Ocean off Costa Rica, Panama and Ecuador.
