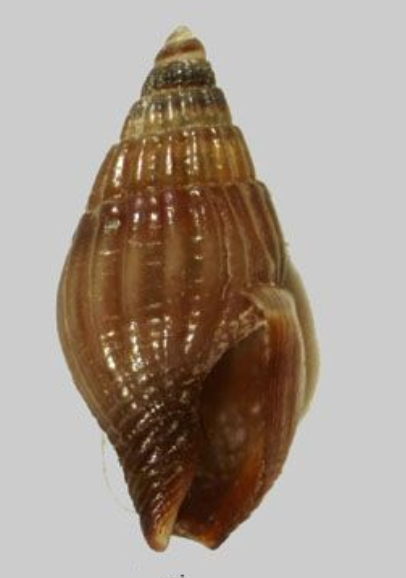
- Shell of Anachis strongi (specimen at the Natural History Museum, Rotterdam)

Scientific classification
- Kingdom: Animalia
- Phylum: Mollusca
- Class: Gastropoda
- Subclass: Caenogastropoda
- Order: Neogastropoda
- Family: Columbellidae
- Genus: Anachis
- Species: A. strongi

Binomial name
- Anachis strongi Bartsch, 1928

= Anachis strongi =

Species of gastropod

Anachis strongi is a species of sea snail in the family Columbellidae, the dove snails.

== Description ==
The length of the shell attains 6 mm, its diameter 3 mm.

(Original description) The shell is small and ovate. Its early whorls are flesh-colored, while the later ones become dark chestnut-brown, displaying an even darker band on the posterior half of the base. The aperture is dark chestnut-brown with a reddish tinge, appearing paler within.

Early whorls are eroded. The succeeding turns are almost appressed at the summit and are marked by low, broadly rounded axial ribs, of which 16 seem to be present upon all the whorls. In addition to these low ribs, the whorls are marked by slender incremental lines. The spaces that separate these ribs are a little narrower than the ribs. The spiral sculpture consists of 4 strongly incised, equal, and equally spaced lines between the summit and suture. The suture is slightly constricted, and the periphery is well rounded.

The base is almost twice the length of the portion between the summit and suture of the last turn. The anterior half is marked by 7 incised spiral lines which separate spiral bands about twice as broad as these lines, which are flattened. On the columellar portion, additional incised spiral grooves separate an equal number of considerably more elevated spiral cords.

The aperture is rather narrow, decidedly channeled anteriorly, and feebly so posteriorly. The outer lip is thick within, narrowing toward the edge, and is marked by 7 denticles within. Of these, the first, which marks the anterior termination of the posterior channel, is slender, while the two succeeding ones are very heavy. The next 3 anterior to this are much less strong, about equaling the first, with the last being feeble. The columellar and parietal walls are covered by a thick callus.

== Distribution ==
This species occurs in the Pacific Ocean off Ecuador.
