= Anachis delineata =

Scientific classification
- Kingdom: Animalia
- Phylum: Mollusca
- Class: Gastropoda
- Subclass: Caenogastropoda
- Order: Neogastropoda
- Family: Columbellidae
- Genus: Anachis
- Species: A. delineata

Binomial name
- Anachis delineata Rolan & de Oliveira, 2008

Species of gastropod

Anachis delineata is a species of sea snail in the family Columbellidae, the dove snails.

== Distribution ==
This marine species occurs off the Cape Verde.
