= Anachis obeliscus =

Scientific classification
- Kingdom: Animalia
- Phylum: Mollusca
- Class: Gastropoda
- Subclass: Caenogastropoda
- Order: Neogastropoda
- Family: Columbellidae
- Genus: Anachis
- Species: A. obeliscus

Binomial name
- Anachis obeliscus Gori, F. Boyer & Pelorce, 2025

Species of gastropod

Anachis obeliscus is a species of sea snail in the family Columbellidae, the dove snails.

== Distribution ==
This species occurs in the Pacific Ocean off Oman.
