= Anachis phanea =

Scientific classification
- Kingdom: Animalia
- Phylum: Mollusca
- Class: Gastropoda
- Subclass: Caenogastropoda
- Order: Neogastropoda
- Family: Columbellidae
- Genus: Anachis
- Species: A. phanea

Binomial name
- Anachis phanea Dall, 1919

Species of gastropod

Anachis phanea is a species of sea snail, a marine gastropod mollusk in the family Columbellidae, the dove snails.

== Description ==
The length of the shell attains 9 mm; its diameter 3.59 mm.

(Original description) The shell is small, acute, slender, and white, comprising six flattish whorls, exclusive of the smooth, glassy protoconch of about one whorl. The suture is distinct. The first two whorls are flat and smooth, while the subsequent whorls feature (approximately 14 on the body whorl) nearly vertical, narrow, straight, and rather sharp ribs with shallow, much wider interspaces that extend over the periphery. The surface is polished, and the base is attenuated and smooth. The aperture is narrow, and the outer lip is simple. The body is erased, and the columella is short, with a pervious axis. The siphonal canal is short, deep, and wide, displaying a marked siphonal fasciole bordered behind with a brown line. A few feeble spiral striae are present on the back of the siphonal canal.

== Distribution ==
This species occurs in the Pacific Ocean off Mexico
