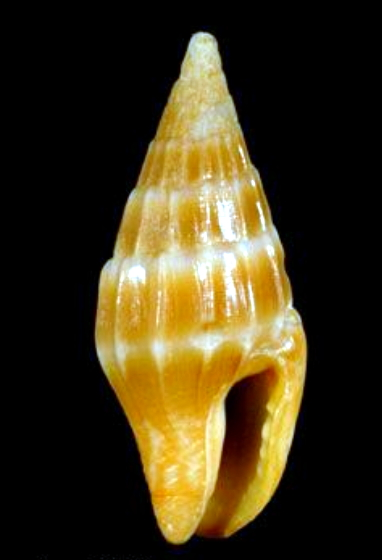
- Shell of Anachis fulva (specimen at Natural History Museum Rotterdam)

Scientific classification
- Kingdom: Animalia
- Phylum: Mollusca
- Class: Gastropoda
- Subclass: Caenogastropoda
- Order: Neogastropoda
- Family: Columbellidae
- Genus: Anachis
- Species: A. fulva

Binomial name
- Anachis fulva (G. B. Sowerby I, 1832)

Synonyms
- Columbella fulva G. B. Sowerby I, 1832 (original combination)

= Anachis fulva =

Species of gastropod

Anachis fulva is a species of sea snail in the family Columbellidae, the dove snails.

== Description ==
The length of the shell attains 8 mm.

(Original description in Latin) The shell presents as ovate-subulate and tawny, and is covered with a very finely reticulated (net-like) epidermis. It comprises 10 whorls; the upper ones display longitudinal ribbing. The body whorl features spiral striations below and longitudinal ribs above. The aperture, along with the internal denticles, appears white.

== Distribution ==
This species occurs in the Pacific Ocean off Costa Rica, Nicaragua, Panama and Ecuador
