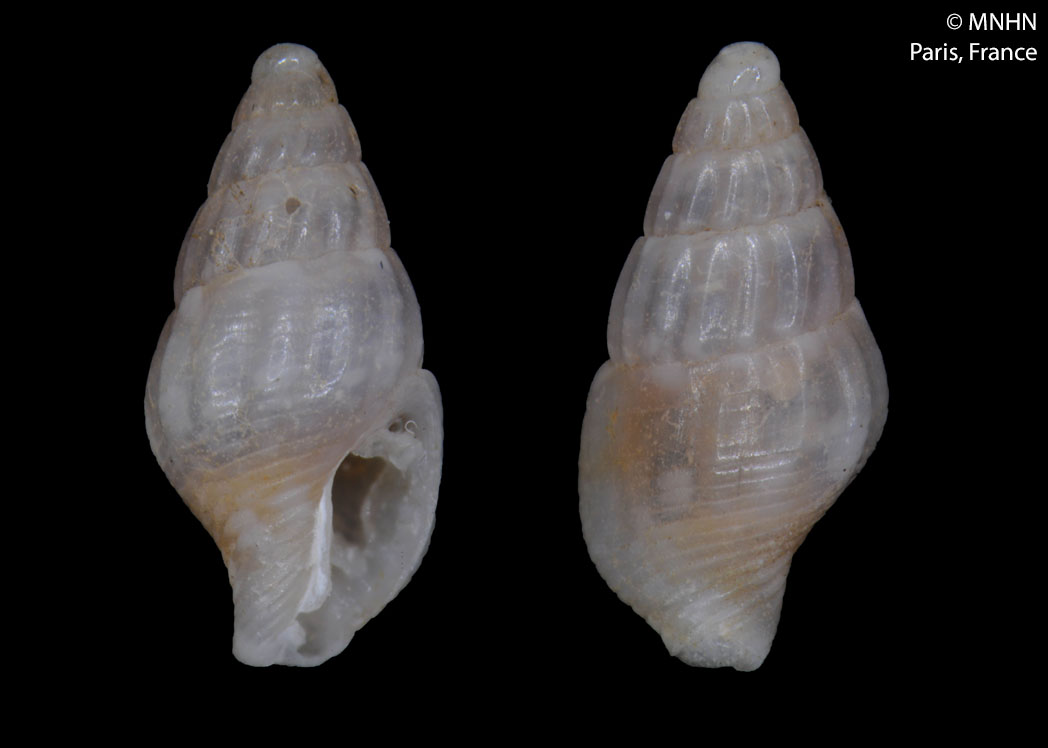
- Shell of Anachis polyaulax (holotype at MNHN, Paris)

Scientific classification
- Kingdom: Animalia
- Phylum: Mollusca
- Class: Gastropoda
- Subclass: Caenogastropoda
- Order: Neogastropoda
- Family: Columbellidae
- Genus: Anachis
- Species: A. polyaulax

Binomial name
- Anachis polyaulax K. Monsecour & D. Monsecour, 2016

= Anachis polyaulax =

Species of gastropod

Anachis polyaulax is a species of sea snail in the family Columbellidae, the dove snails.

== Description ==
The length of the shell attains 4.4 mm.

== Distribution ==
This species occurs off New Caledonia at depth 360 m.
