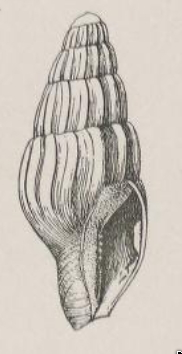
- Shell of Anachis fusidens (holotype)

Scientific classification
- Kingdom: Animalia
- Phylum: Mollusca
- Class: Gastropoda
- Subclass: Caenogastropoda
- Order: Neogastropoda
- Family: Columbellidae
- Genus: Anachis
- Species: A. fusidens

Binomial name
- Anachis fusidens (Dall, 1908)

Synonyms
- Columbella (Anachis) fusidens Dall, 1908 (superseded combination); Columbella fusidens Dall, 1908 (superseded combination)

= Anachis fusidens =

Species of gastropod

Anachis fusidens is a species of sea snail in the family Columbellidae, the dove snails.

== Description ==
The length of the shell (without protoconch) attains 15 mm, its diameter 10 mm.

(Original description) The shell is of moderate size, slender, and acute. It presents a pale brown or brownish-white hue. It possesses a thin, smooth periostracum. It comprises five and a half whorls, excluding the (lost) protoconch. The suture is distinct but not deep.

The axial sculpture consists of narrow, rounded, nearly vertical ribs (thirteen on the body whorl) with subequal interspaces, extending from suture to suture and on the body whorl to the base. Spiral sculpture is absent above and obsolete on the base, though a few strong threads are evident on the siphonal canal and finer ones on the siphonal fasciole.

The aperture is narrow and contracted. The outer lip is slightly thickened, and within it, parallel to the edge, lies a ridge of callus. This ridge is more or less continuous and striated, appearing as if composed of five or six fused denticles. In the type specimen, this ridge is broken into two parts, with the shorter part anterior; in other specimens, it remains continuous. The body and columella are covered with a rather thick layer of callus, which is obsoletely transversely striated, and in some specimens, possibly dentate. Its outer anterior edge is slightly raised. The columella is nearly straight, and the siphonal canal is very short and slightly recurved.

== Distribution ==
This species occurs in the Pacific Ocean off the Galápagos Islands
