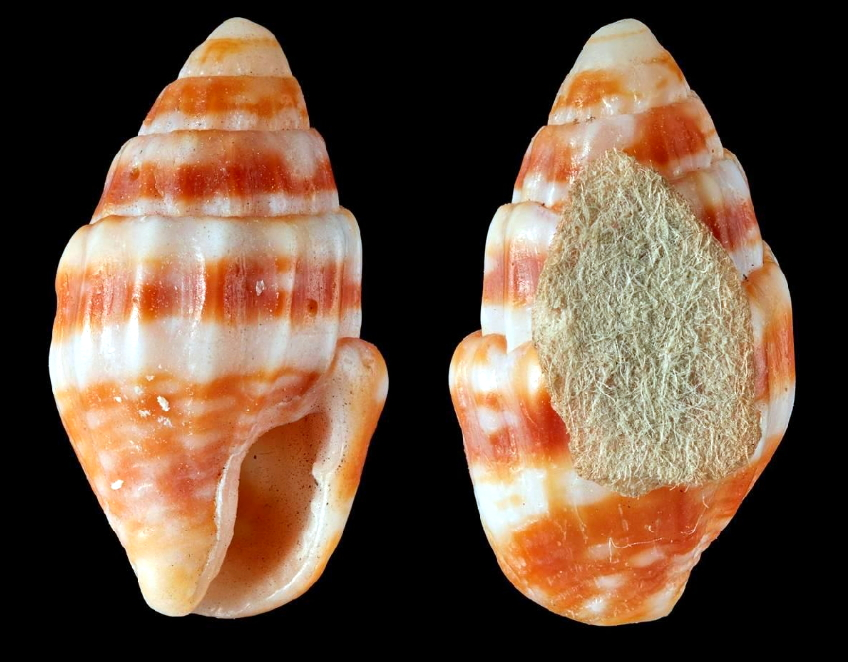
- Shell of Anachis varicosa (syntype at the Natural History Museum, London)

Scientific classification
- Kingdom: Animalia
- Phylum: Mollusca
- Class: Gastropoda
- Subclass: Caenogastropoda
- Order: Neogastropoda
- Family: Columbellidae
- Genus: Anachis
- Species: A. varicosa

Binomial name
- Anachis varicosa (Gaskoin, 1852)

Synonyms
- Columbella macrostoma Anton, 1838; Columbella macrostoma Reeve, 1859; Columbella valida Reeve, 1859; Columbella varicosa Gaskoin, 1852 (original combination)

= Anachis varicosa =

Species of gastropod

Anachis varicosa is a species of sea snail in the family Columbellidae, the dove snails.

== Description ==
(Original description) The shell is oblong-ovate, shining, thick, and strong. It appears white, generally covered irregularly and intensely with an almost black-brown coloration, except for the posterior edges of the whorls, where it remains nearly white. The spire is acuminated, constituting one half the length of the shell, and possesses seven to eight rather convex, slightly diagonal whorls.

Sculpture: Strong, prominent, and somewhat distant varices exist on the posterior margin of the body whorl. The anterior portion of this whorl exhibits many striae passing transversely and obliquely forwards from the columellar edge of the aperture. The aperture is oblong, rather square and straight, and internally displays a bluish-white color.

The outer lip is straight and marginated, having a rather large notch at the junction with the body of the shell. Anteriorly to this notch, it features about five or six slight internal denticles, with the posterior one being larger. The inner lip is smooth, without denticles, and its edge is slightly elevated and thin. The siphonal canal is short and rather broad.

== Distribution ==
This species is found in the Pacific Ocean off Peru.
