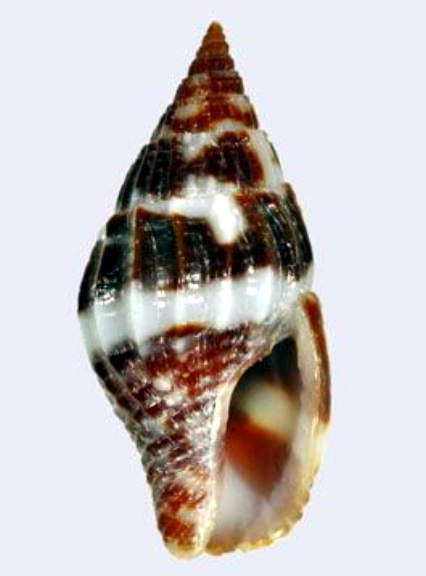
- Shell of Anachis decimdentata (specimen at the Natural History Museum Rotterdam)

Scientific classification
- Kingdom: Animalia
- Phylum: Mollusca
- Class: Gastropoda
- Subclass: Caenogastropoda
- Order: Neogastropoda
- Family: Columbellidae
- Genus: Anachis
- Species: A. decimdentata

Binomial name
- Anachis decimdentata Pilsbry & H. N. Lowe, 1932

= Anachis decimdentata =

Species of gastropod

Anachis decimdentata is a species of sea snail in the family Columbellidae, the dove snails.

== Description ==
The length of the shell attains 18 mm.

== Distribution ==
This species occurs in the Pacific Ocean off Nicaragua and Panama.
