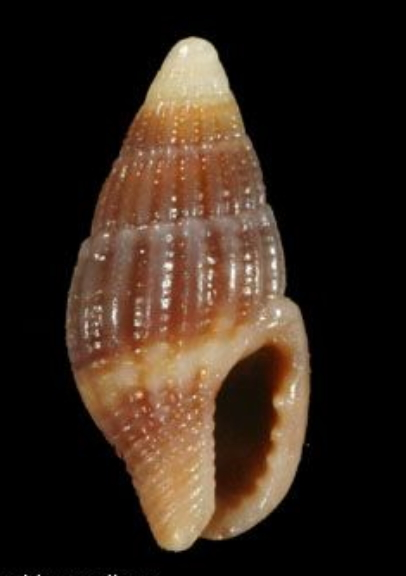
- Shell of Anachis spadicea (specimen at the Natural History Museum Rotterdam)

Scientific classification
- Kingdom: Animalia
- Phylum: Mollusca
- Class: Gastropoda
- Subclass: Caenogastropoda
- Order: Neogastropoda
- Family: Columbellidae
- Genus: Anachis
- Species: A. spadicea

Binomial name
- Anachis spadicea (R. A. Philippi, 1846)

Synonyms
- Columbella spadicea R. A. Philippi, 1846 superseded combination

= Anachis spadicea =

Species of gastropod

Anachis spadicea is a species of sea snail in the family Columbellidae, the dove snails.

== Description ==
The length of the shell attains 4.5 mm, its diameter 2¼ mm.

(Original description in Latin) The solid shell is oblong-fusiform, longitudinally plicate-ribbed, and transversely striated at the base, appearing spadiceous (a dull reddish-brown). The body whorl is encircled by a white line in the middle. The spire extends beyond the aperture. The aperture is narrow and oblong, with the outer lip equipped with 2-3 denticles inside.

== Distribution ==
This marine species occurs off Mazatlán ,Mexico an off Costa Rica.
