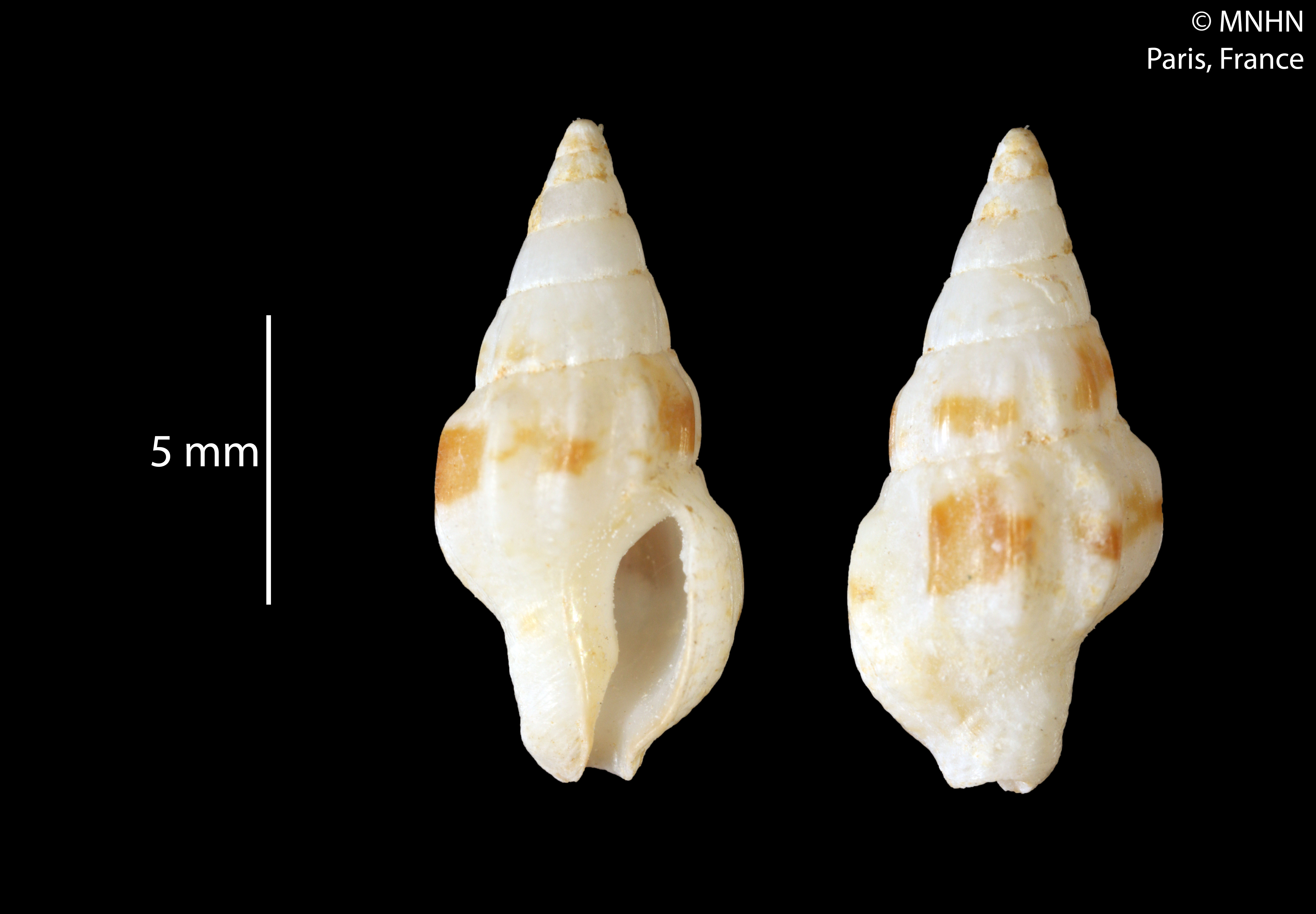
- Shell of Anachis carloslirae (paratype at MNHN, Paris)

Scientific classification
- Kingdom: Animalia
- Phylum: Mollusca
- Class: Gastropoda
- Subclass: Caenogastropoda
- Order: Neogastropoda
- Family: Columbellidae
- Genus: Anachis
- Species: A. carloslirae

Binomial name
- Anachis carloslirae P. M. S. Costa, 1996

Synonyms
- Anachis (Costoanachis) carloslirai P. M. S. Costa, 1996 ·

= Anachis carloslirae =

Species of gastropod

Anachis carloslirae is a species of sea snail in the family Columbellidae, the dove snails.

== Distribution ==
This species occurs in the Atlantic Ocean off Brazil.
