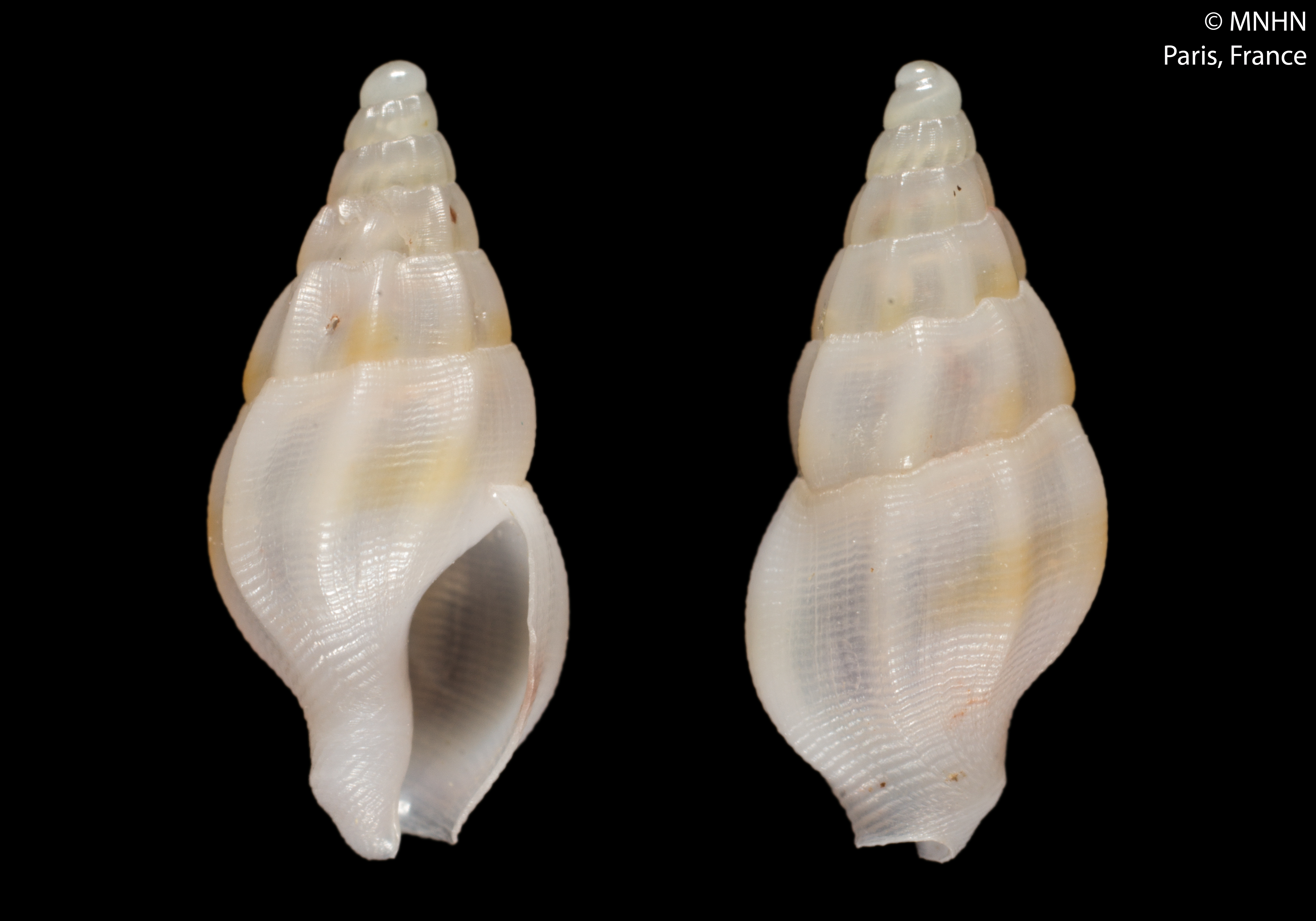
- Shell of Anachis martinicensis (holotype in MNHN, Paris)

Scientific classification
- Kingdom: Animalia
- Phylum: Mollusca
- Class: Gastropoda
- Subclass: Caenogastropoda
- Order: Neogastropoda
- Family: Columbellidae
- Genus: Anachis
- Species: A. martinicensis

Binomial name
- Anachis martinicensis Pelorce, 2013

Synonyms
- Anachis (Costoanachis) martinicensis Pelorce, 2013 alternative representation

= Anachis martinicensis =

Species of gastropod

Anachis martinicensis is a species of sea snail in the family Columbellidae, the dove snails.

== Description ==
The length of the shell attains 6.4 mm.

== Distribution ==
This species occurs in the Caribbean Sea off Martinique.
