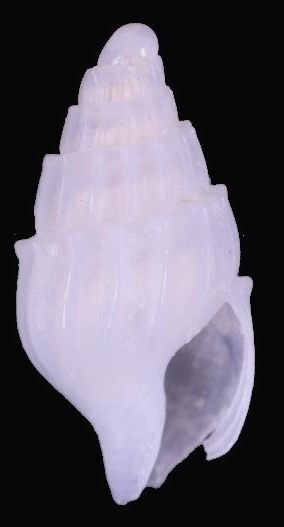
- Shell of Anachis chuni (specimen at MNHN, Paris)

Scientific classification
- Kingdom: Animalia
- Phylum: Mollusca
- Class: Gastropoda
- Subclass: Caenogastropoda
- Order: Neogastropoda
- Family: Columbellidae
- Genus: Anachis
- Species: A. chuni

Binomial name
- Anachis chuni (Thiele, 1925)

Synonyms
- Columbella chuni Thiele, 1925 (original combination)

= Anachis chuni =

Species of gastropod

Anachis chuni is a species of sea snail in the family Columbellidae, the dove snails.

== Distribution ==
This species occurs in the Indian Ocean off Zanzibar.
