= Anachis berryi =

Scientific classification
- Kingdom: Animalia
- Phylum: Mollusca
- Class: Gastropoda
- Subclass: Caenogastropoda
- Order: Neogastropoda
- Family: Columbellidae
- Genus: Anachis
- Species: A. berryi

Binomial name
- Anachis berryi Shasky, 1970

Species of gastropod

Anachis berryi is a species of sea snail in the family Columbellidae, the dove snails.

== Description ==
The length of the shall attains 9.2 mm, its diameter 3.3 mm.

== Distribution ==
This species occurs in the Pacific Ocean off tropical Western America.
