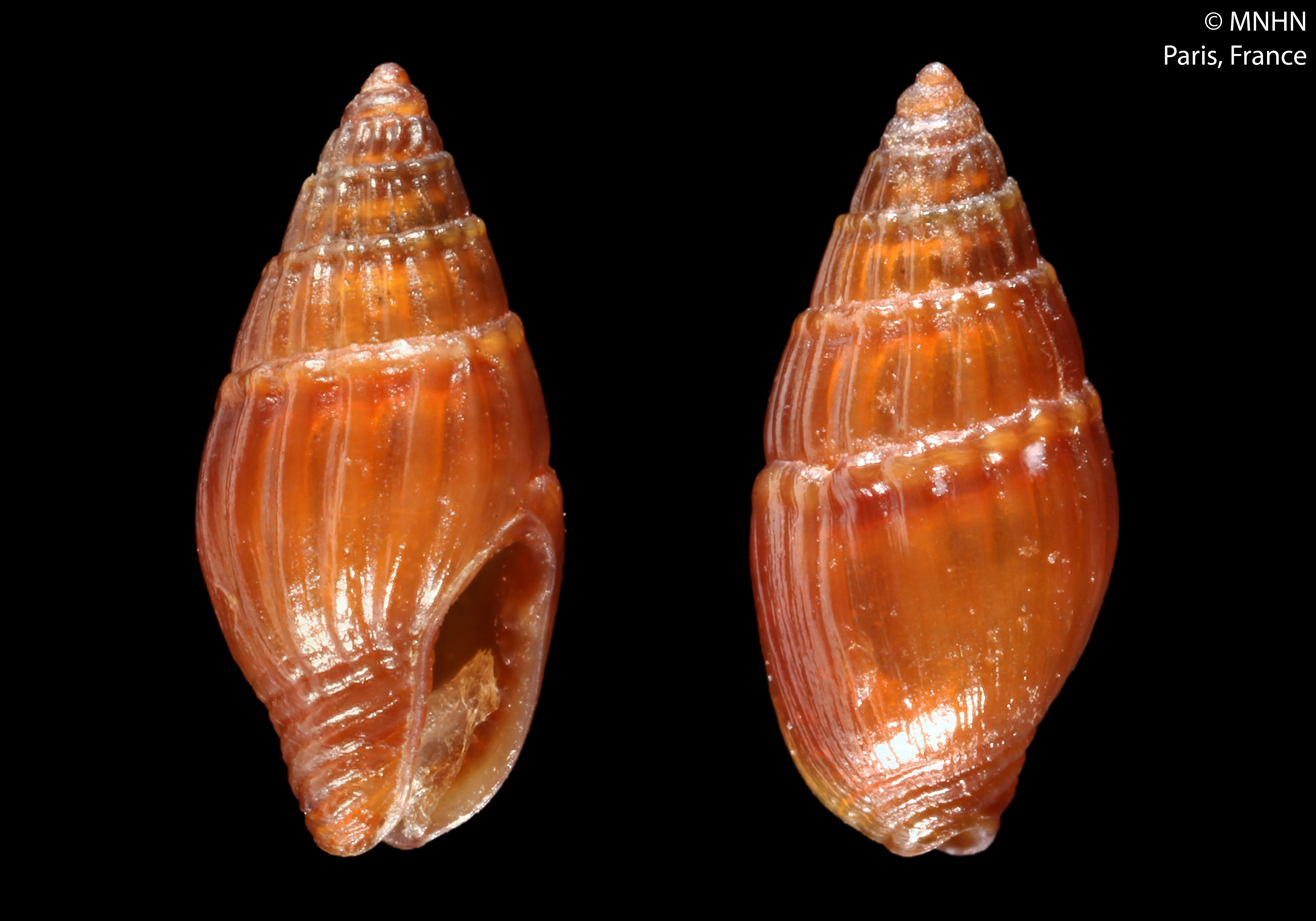
- Shell of Anachis delamarrei (holotype at MNHN, Paris)

Scientific classification
- Kingdom: Animalia
- Phylum: Mollusca
- Class: Gastropoda
- Subclass: Caenogastropoda
- Order: Neogastropoda
- Family: Columbellidae
- Genus: Anachis
- Species: A. delamarrei

Binomial name
- Anachis delamarrei Rolan & Boyer, 2006

= Anachis delamarrei =

Species of gastropod

Anachis delamarrei is a species of sea snail in the family Columbellidae, the dove snails.

== Description ==
The length of the shell attains 3.5 mm.

== Distribution ==
This marine species occurs off Gabon.
