= Anachis leblondae =

Scientific classification
- Kingdom: Animalia
- Phylum: Mollusca
- Class: Gastropoda
- Subclass: Caenogastropoda
- Order: Neogastropoda
- Family: Columbellidae
- Genus: Anachis
- Species: A. leblondae

Binomial name
- Anachis leblondae Pelorce, 2020

Species of gastropod

Anachis leblondae is a species of sea snail in the family Columbellidae, the dove snails.

== Distribution ==
This species occurs off Guadeloupe, Caribbean Sea.
