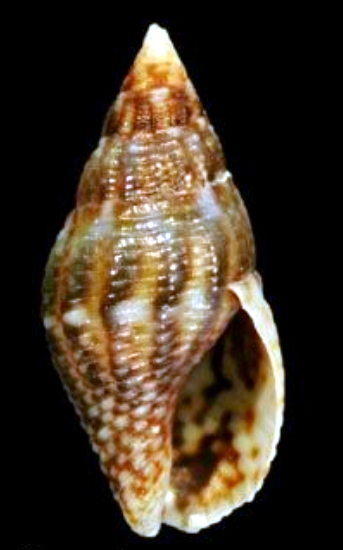
- Shell of Anachis rugulosa (specimen at the Natural History Museum Rotterdam)

Scientific classification
- Kingdom: Animalia
- Phylum: Mollusca
- Class: Gastropoda
- Subclass: Caenogastropoda
- Order: Neogastropoda
- Family: Columbellidae
- Genus: Anachis
- Species: A. rugulosa

Binomial name
- Anachis rugulosa (G. B. Sowerby I, 1844)

Synonyms
- Columbella rugulosa G. B. Sowerby I, 1844 (original combination)

= Anachis rugulosa =

Species of gastropod

Anachis rugulosa is a species of sea snail in the family Columbellidae, the dove snails.

== Description ==
The length of the shell attains 11 mm.

(Original description) The shell is obovate, rugulose, and thick, presenting a violaceous black color with an anterior band and very small dots of a whitish color. It comprises five whorls, which are longitudinally ribbed and delicately decussately striated. The anterior cross-striae are stronger than the rest. The aperture is rather broad, and the internal denticles of the outer lip are few and rather large.

== Distribution ==
This marine species occurs off the Galápagos Islands.
