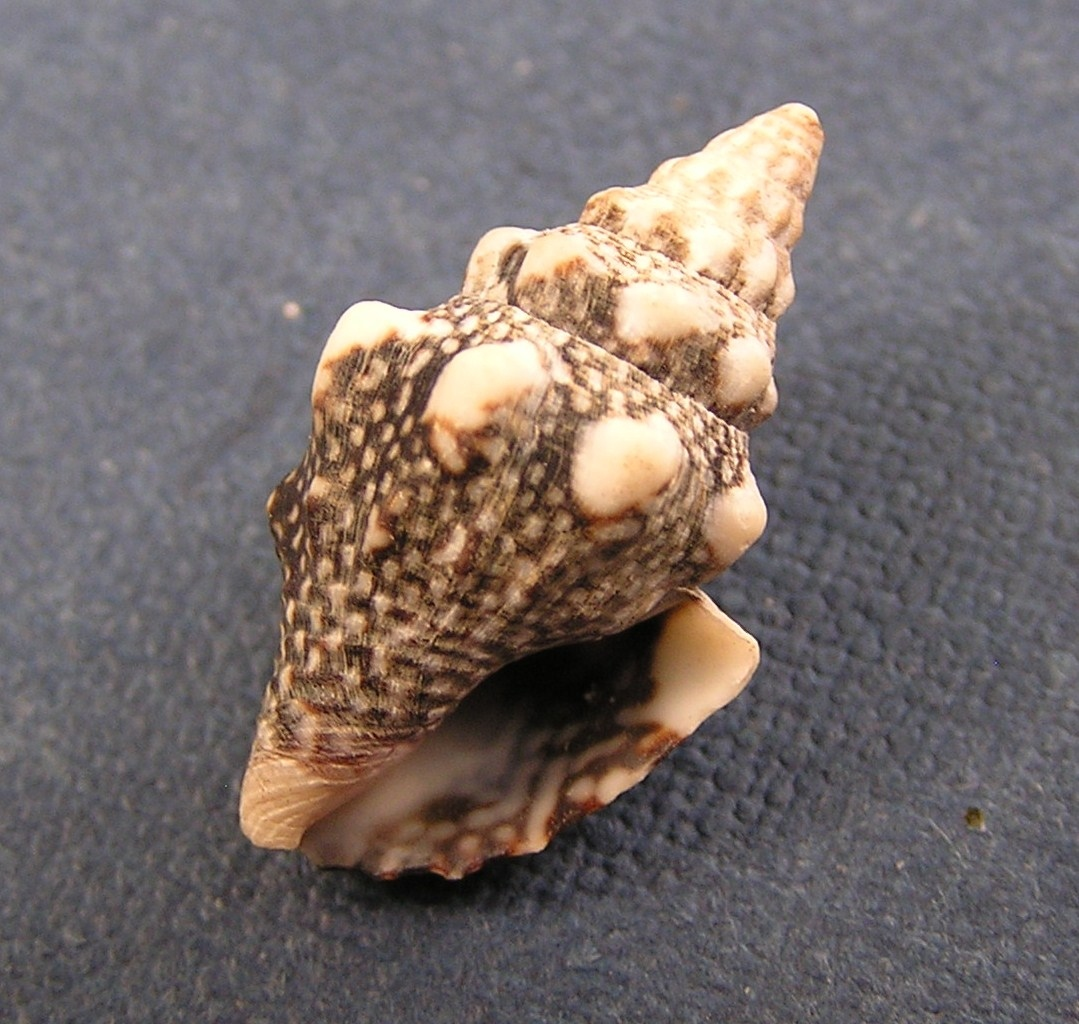
- A shell of Anachis boivini

Scientific classification
- Kingdom: Animalia
- Phylum: Mollusca
- Class: Gastropoda
- Subclass: Caenogastropoda
- Order: Neogastropoda
- Superfamily: Buccinoidea
- Family: Columbellidae
- Genus: Anachis; H. Adams & A. Adams, 1853

Type species
- Columbella scalarina G. B. Sowerby I, 1832

Synonyms
- † Anachis (Macgintopsis) Olsson & Harbison, 1953 alternative representation; Anachys [sic] (misspelling); Atilia H. Adams & A. Adams, 1853; Attilia H. Adams & A. Adams, 1853 misspelling - incorrect subsequent spelling; † Brachystyloma Weisbord, 1962; Columbella (Anachis) H. Adams & A. Adams, 1853 superseded rank; Columbella (Atilia) H. Adams & A. Adams, 1853; Columella (Anachis) H. Adams & A. Adams, 1853; Mitrella (Anachis) H. Adams & A. Adams, 1853 superseded rank; Mitrella (Atilia) H. Adams & A. Adams, 1853; Pyrene (Anachis) H. Adams & A. Adams, 1853

= Anachis =

Genus of gastropods

Anachis is a large genus of sea snails in the family Columbellidae, the dove snails.

Anachis is supported as highly polyphyletic.

== Description ==
This marine genus thrives in all tropical regions and comprises small to moderately sized species.

The shell is oval-fusiform and longitudinally strongly ribbed. The spire is elevated. The body whorl is not narrowed in front. The aperture is narrow. The columella is straight. The outer lip is nearly straight, features a posterior sinus, and is crenulated within.

== Species ==
As of June 2025, the World Register of Marine Species listed the following species in genus Anachis

- Anachis adelinae G. W. Tryon, 1883
- Anachis albonodosa P. P. Carpenter, 1857
- Anachis aliceae (Pallary, 1900)
- Anachis alliouagana Faber, 2004
- † Anachis anglica (S. V. Wood, 1874)
- Anachis atkinsoni (Tenison Woods, 1876)
- Anachis atramentaria Sowerby, 1844
- Anachis aurantia (Lamarck, 1822)
- Anachis avaroides Nordsieck, 1975
- Anachis bacalladoi Espinosa, Ortea & Moro, 2008
- Anachis barazeri K. Monsecour & D. Monsecour, 2018
- Anachis bastionii Pelorce, 2020
- Anachis beachportensis (Verco, 1910)
- Anachis berryi Shasky, 1970
- Anachis boivini (Kiener, 1841)
- Anachis carloslirae Costa, 1996
- † Anachis chariessa T. L. McGinty, 1940
- Anachis chuni (Thiele, 1925)
- † Anachis clewistonensis M. Smith, 1936
- Anachis cominellaeformis (Tate, 1892)
- Anachis constrictocanalis K. Monsecour & D. Monsecour, 2016
- Anachis corbariae K. Monsecour & D. Monsecour, 2024
- Anachis coronata (G.B. Sowerby, 1832)
- Anachis coseli Diaz & Mittnacht, 1991
- Anachis costellata (Broderip & Sowerby, 1829)
- † Anachis crassicostata Wanner & Hahn, 1935(accepted > unreplaced junior homonym)
- † Anachis crassicostata Cossmann, 1903
- Anachis cuspidata (Marrat, 1877)
- Anachis decimdentata Pilsbry & Lowe, 1932
- Anachis delamarrei Rolan & Boyer, 2006
- Anachis delapsarbocola K. Monsecour & Chino, 2025
- Anachis delineata Rolan & de Oliveira, 2008
- Anachis demanorum De Jong & Coomans, 1988
- Anachis domlamyi Pelorce, 2020
- Anachis donnae Moolenbeek & Dance, 1994
- Anachis facula K. Monsecour & D. Monsecour, 2016
- Anachis fasciata (G.B. Sowerby I, 1825)
- Anachis fauroti (Jousseaume, 1888)
- Anachis fayae A. M. Keen, 1971
- Anachis fenestrata (Verco, 1910)
- Anachis fluctuata (Sowerby, 1832)
- Anachis freytagi (Maltzan, 1884) – West Africa
- † Anachis fritschi (O. Boettger, 1883)
- Anachis fulva Sowerby, 1832
- Anachis fusidens (W. H. Dall, 1908)
- † Anachis gembacana (K. Martin, 1884)
- Anachis globosa K. Monsecour & D. Monsecour, 2024
- Anachis gracilis (C. B. Adams, 1852)
- Anachis guerreroensis A. M. Strong & J. G. Hertlein, 1937
- Anachis hannana Hertlein & Strong, 1951
- Anachis herberti K. Monsecour & D. Monsecour, 2024
- Anachis incisa K. Monsecour & D. Monsecour, 2016
- Anachis inferiodentata K. Monsecour & D. Monsecour, 2016
- Anachis inopinatus K. Monsecour & D. Monsecour, 2018
- Anachis isabellei (d'Orbigny, 1839)
- Anachis juani Horro & Rolán, 2010
- Anachis jungi Faber, 2004
- Anachis kathleenae F. Boyer, Pelorce & Gori, 2022
- Anachis kraussii (G.B. Sowerby I, 1844) – Indian Ocean
- Anachis lamellata K. Monsecour & D. Monsecour, 2024
- Anachis leauae K. Monsecour & D. Monsecour, 2024
- Anachis leblondae Pelorce, 2020
- Anachis lentiginosa (R. B. Hinds, 1844)
- Anachis lillianae Whitney, 1978 – West Mexico
- Anachis limula K. Monsecour & D. Monsecour, 2016
- Anachis linelegallae K. Monsecour & D. Monsecour, 2024
- Anachis lurida (Hedley, 1907)
- Anachis lyrata Sowerby I, 1832 – West America
- Anachis madagascarensis Bozzetti, 2019
- Anachis maestratii K. Monsecour & D. Monsecour, 2024
- Anachis martinicensis Pelorce, 2013
- † Anachis masakadoi (Yokoyama, 1922)
- Anachis menaletta (Duclos, 1846)
- Anachis milium Dall, 1916
- Anachis miser (G.B. Sowerby I, 1844)
- Anachis moesta (C. B. Adams, 1852)
- Anachis mogolloni Arias Ávila, 2021
- Anachis nigricostata (E. A. Smith, 1879)
- Anachis nigrofusca P. P. Carpenter, 1857
- Anachis nisitella P. L. Duclos, 1840
- † Anachis njalindungensis (K. Martin, 1921)
- Anachis norfolkensis K. Monsecour & D. Monsecour, 2016
- Anachis obeliscus Gori, F. Boyer & Pelorce, 2025
- Anachis oxillia (Duclos, 1846)
- Anachis pardalis R. B. Hinds, 1843
- Anachis pellucida Bozzetti, 2019
- Anachis phanea W. H. Dall, 1919
- Anachis pinguis K. Monsecour & D. Monsecour, 2016
- Anachis polyaulax K. Monsecour & D. Monsecour, 2016
- † Anachis praecursor (Yokoyama, 1922)
- Anachis proclivis K. Monsecour & D. Monsecour, 2016
- Anachis profunda Pelorce, 2017
- Anachis ragivarui K. Monsecour & D. Monsecour, 2018
- Anachis rassierensis Smythe, 1985
- Anachis raysutana Smythe, 1985
- Anachis rechonchuda Lima & Guimarães, 2015
- Anachis reedi P. Bartsch, 1928
- Anachis remoensis (Gatliff & Gabriel, 1910)
- Anachis renatae Rios, 2009
- Anachis rhodae Radwin, 1968 – America
- Anachis richardi (Dautzenberg & Fischer, 1906)
- Anachis ritteri Hertlein & Strong, 1951
- Anachis roberti Monsecour & Monsecour, 2006
- Anachis rugosa (Sowerby, 1832)
- Anachis rugulosa (Sowerby, 1844)
- Anachis ryalli Rolan, 2005
- Anachis sanfelipensis Lowe, 1935
- Anachis scalarina (Sowerby, 1832)
- Anachis sinaloa A. M. Strong & J. G. Hertlein, 1937
- Anachis spadicea (R. A. Philippi, 1846)
- Anachis stricta (Watson, 1882)
- Anachis strix (Watson, 1882)
- Anachis strongi P. Bartsch, 1928
- Anachis tangkangensis K. Monsecour & Chino, 2025
- Anachis teevani J. G. Hertlein & A. M. Strong, 1951
- Anachis terpsichore (G. B. Sowerby I, 1822) – India
- Anachis treva F. Baker, G. D. Hanna & A. M. Strong, 1938
- † Anachis turriculata (Yokoyama, 1922) (accepted > unreplaced junior homonym, invalid; based on preoccupied original name)
- Anachis unidens Pelorce, 2020
- Anachis valledori Rolán & Luque, 2002
- Anachis varia (Sowerby, 1832)
- Anachis varicosa (Gaskoin, 1852)
- Anachis veleda (Duclos, 1846)
- Anachis vermiculucostata Monsecour & Monsecour, 2009
- Anachis vexillum (L. A. Reeve, 1858)
- Anachis virginiae K. Monsecour & D. Monsecour, 2024
- Anachis wareni K. Monsecour & D. Monsecour, 2024
- Anachis xani Rolán & Gori, 2012

The Indo-Pacific Molluscan Database lists the following species with names in current use:

- Anachis dolicha (Verco, 1910)
- Anachis fulgida (Reeve, 1859)
- Anachis fuscolineata (Thiele, 1930)
- Anachis marquesa (Gaskoin, 1852)
- Anachis smithi (Angas, 1877)
- Anachis sugillata (Reeve, 1859)
- Anachis vercoi (Thiele, 1930)

As of July 2010, the following species were mentioned in the database Shell-Bearing Mollusca:

- Anachis albomarginata Okamoto & Habe, 1979 – Japan
- Anachis almiranta Ch. Hedley, 1915 – Australia
- Anachis alternata A. A. Gould, 1860 – China
- Anachis amirantium Smith, 1879 – Japan
- Anachis antillarum L. A. Reeve, 1859 – West Indies
- Anachis atomella P. L. Duclos, 1840 – Europe
- Anachis bicanaliferum Sowerby, 1832 West America
- Anachis brasiliana E. von Martens, 1897 – America
- Anachis calva Verco, 1910 – Australia
- Anachis cicinnata Montrouzier, 1860 – Japan
- Anachis cithara L. A. Reeve, 1859
- Anachis columnaria W. L. May, 1915 – Australia
- Anachis cophinodes H. Suter, 1908 – New Zealand
- Anachis darwini G. F. Angas, 1877 – Australia
- Anachis dautzenbergi Hervier, 1899 – Indo-Pacific
- Anachis descendens E. von Martens – West Africa
- Anachis diggelsi J. Brazier, 1874 – Australia
- Anachis divaricata H. A. Pilsbry, 1904 – Japan
- Anachis electona P. L. Duclos, 1840 (taxon inquirendum)
- Anachis emergens Fischer-Piette & Nicklès, 1946 – Senegal
- Anachis enwrighti A. W. B. Powell, 1940 – New Zealand
- Anachis gemmulifera Ch. Hedley, 1907 – Australia
- Anachis gilva C. T. Menke, 1847
- Anachis gowllandi J. Brazier, 1874 – Australia
- Anachis hahajimama H. A. Pilsbry, 1904 – Japan
- Anachis harpiformis Sowerby, 1832 – West America
- Anachis intricata Ch. Hedley, 1912 – Australia
- Anachis io P. Bartsch, 1915 – South Africa
- Anachis iodostoma Gaskoin, 1852 – Australia
- Anachis japonica A. Adams, 1860 – Japan
- Anachis kirostra P. L. Duclos, 1840 -
- Anachis legrandi J. E. Tennison-Woods, 1876 – Australia
- Anachis liocyma H. A. Pilsbry, 1904 – Indo-Pacific
- Anachis mariae A. W. B. Powell, 1940 – New Zealand
- Anachis melvillei H. Strebel, 1905 – Southwest Atlantic
- Anachis minuscula A. A. Gould, 1862 – Japan
  - Anachis misera nigromaculata J. R. Tomlin 1915 – Japan
  - Anachis misera plicatospira G. B. Sowerby III, 1915 – Japan
- Anachis mitriformis A. Adams, 1860 – Indo-Pacific
- Anachis multicostata W. L. May, 1910 – Australia
- Anachis nanisca Herbier, 1899 – Japan
- Anachis nodicincta H. Suter, 1899 – New Zealand
- Anachis oerstedi E. von Martens, 1897
- Anachis plexa Ch. Hedley, 1901 – Australia
- Anachis pumila R. W. Dunker, 1860 – Indo-Pacific
- Anachis regulus Souverbie, 1864 – Indo-Pacific
- Anachis savignyi F. P. Jousseaume in Mozzo, 1929 – Europe
- Anachis sinensis G. B. Sowerby III, 1894 -Indo-Pacific
- Anachis strenella P. L. Duclos, 1840
- Anachis subabnormis H. Suter, 1899 – New Zealand
- Anachis suffusa Sowerby, 1844 – Galápagos Islands
- Anachis teophania P. L. Duclos, 1846
- Anachis uncinata Sowerby, 1832
- Anachis validicosta T. Habe, 1960 – Indo-Pacific
- Anachis vivens A. W. B. Powell, 1934 – New Zealand
- Anachis yukitai T. Habe, 1991 – Japan

== Synonyms ==
A long list of synonyms
- Anachis acuta Stearns, 1873 : synonym of Suturoglypta iontha (Ravenel, 1861) (junior subjective synonym)
- Anachis albella C. B. Adams, 1850 – Caribbean: synonym of Suturoglypta albella (C. B. Adams, 1850) (superseded combination)
- Anachis algoensis Sowerby, 1892: synonym of Aesopus algoensis (G. B. Sowerby III, 1892)
- Anachis alofa (Hedley, 1899): synonym of Mitrella alofa (Hedley, 1899)
- Anachis amphissella (Dall, 1881) : synonym of Astyris amphissella (Dall, 1881) (superseded combination)
- Anachis atrata A. A. Gould, 1860 – South Africa: synonym of Zafra atrata (A. Gould, 1860) (superseded combination)
- Anachis avara (Say, 1822) : synonym of Costoanachis avara (Say, 1822) (superseded combination)
- Anachis bartschii Dall, 1918 : synonym of Anachis gaskoini P. P. Carpenter, 1857 : synonym of Anachis menaletta (Duclos, 1846)
- Anachis bartschii Dall, 1918, sensu Keen, 1958 : synonym of Anachis fayae Keen, 1971 (unaccepted > misapplication)
- Anachis beckeri (G. B. Sowerby III, 1900) : synonym of Costoanachis beckeri (G. B. Sowerby III, 1900)
- Anachis bifasciata Ardovini, 2005 : synonym of Zafra pumila (Dunker, 1860) (junior subjective synonym)
- Anachis blignautae Kilburn, 1998 : synonym of Suturoglypta blignautae (Kilburn, 1998) : synonym of Maintenonia blignautae (Kilburn, 1998) (original combination)
- Anachis burnupi (E. A. Smith, 1901) : synonym of Zafrona trifilosa (E. A. Smith, 1882) : synonym of Smithena trifilosa (E. A. Smith, 1882)
- Anachis cancellata Castellanos, 1979 : synonym of Amphissa cancellata (Castellanos, 1979) (original combination)
- Anachis cancellata (Gaskoin, 1852) : synonym of Anachis aurantia (Lamarck, 1822)
- Anachis carmen Pilsbry & H. N. Lowe, 1932 : synonym of Anachis pardalis (Hinds, 1843) (junior subjective synonym)
- Anachis catenata (G.B. Sowerby, 1844): synonym of Costoanachis catenata (G. B. Sowerby I, 1844) (superseded combination)
- Anachis cingulata Lussi, 2009 : synonym of Decipifus cingulatus (Lussi, 2009) (original combination)
- Anachis comistea (Melvill, 1906) : synonym of Seminella comistea (Melvill, 1906)
- Anachis consanguinea (G. B. Sowerby III, 1897) : synonym of Decipifus consanguineus (G. B. Sowerby III, 1897)
- Anachis costulata (Cantraine, 1835) : synonym of Amphissa acutecostata (R. A. Philippi, 1844)
- Anachis crassilabris (Reeve, 1859) : synonym of Parvanachis obesa (C. B. Adams, 1845)
- Anachis dalli Bartsch, 1931 : synonym of Parvanachis pygmaea (G. B. Sowerby I, 1832)
- Anachis debilis (Hedley, 1915) : synonym of Zafra debilis Hedley, 1915
- Anachis demani De Jong & Coomans, 1988 : synonym of Anachis demanorum De Jong & Coomans, 1988 (original combination)
- Anachis dibolos (Barnard, 1964) : synonym of Anarithma metula (Hinds, 1843)
- Anachis diminuta (C. B. Adams, 1852) : synonym of Parvanachis diminuta (C. B. Adams, 1852)
- Anachis erepta (Barnard, 1969) : synonym of Drillia erepta Barnard, 1969
- Anachis fenneli Radwin, 1968 – America: synonym of Costoanachis fenneli (Radwin, 1968)
- Anachis floridana Rehder, 1939 : synonym of Costoanachis floridana (Rehder, 1939)
- Anachis fuscafasciata Lussi, 2009 : synonym of Antimitrella fuscafasciata (Lussi, 2009) (original combination)
- Anachis fuscostrigata P. P. Carpenter, 1864 : synonym of Aesopus fuscostrigatus (P. P. Carpenter, 1864) (superseded combination)
- Anachis gaskoini P. P. Carpenter, 1857: synonym of Anachis menaletta (Duclos, 1846) (junior subjective synonym)
- Anachis guildingii (G. B. Sowerby I, 1844) : synonym of Costoanachis hotessieriana (A. d'Orbigny, 1853)
- Anachis haliaeeti (Jeffreys, 1867) : synonym of Amphissa acutecostata (R. A. Philippi, 1844)
- Anachis haliaeti [sic] : synonym of Anachis haliaeeti (Jeffreys, 1867) : synonym of Amphissa acutecostata (R. A. Philippi, 1844) (misspelling)
- Anachis helenae F. H. A. Costa, 1983 : synonym of Cosmioconcha helenae (F. H. A. Costa, 1983) (original combination)
- Anachis hilli Pilsbry & H. N. Lowe, 1932 : synonym of Glyptanachis hilli (Pilsbry & H. N. Lowe, 1932)
- Anachis hotessieriana (A. d'Orbigny, 1853) : synonym of Costoanachis hotessieriana (A. d'Orbigny, 1853) (superseded combination)
- Anachis incerta (Stearns, 1892) : synonym of Falsuszafrona incerta (Stearns, 1892)
- Anachis iontha (Ravenel, 1861) : synonym of Suturoglypta iontha (Ravenel, 1861)
- Anachis karukeraensis Pelorce & Faber, 2013 : synonym of Minimanachis karukeraensis (Pelorce & Faber, 2013) (original combination)
- Anachis kraussi [sic] : synonym of Anachis kraussii (G. B. Sowerby I, 1844) (misspelling)
- Anachis lafresnayi (P. Fischer & Bernardi, 1857) : synonym of Cotonopsis lafresnayi (P. Fischer & Bernardi, 1857)
- Anachis leptalea (E. A. Smith, 1902) : synonym of Pyreneola leptalea (E. A. Smith, 1902)
- Anachis lightfooti Smith, 1901: synonym of Zafrona lightfooti (E. A. Smith, 1901)
- Anachis mangelioides (Reeve, 1859) : synonym of Suturoglypta pretrii (Duclos, 1846)
- Anachis mcgintyi Nowell-Usticke, 1959 : synonym of Costoanachis hotessieriana (A. d'Orbigny, 1853) (junior subjective synonym)
- Anachis meta (Thiele, 1925) : synonym of Aesopus meta (Thiele, 1925)
- Anachis microstoma (Thiele, 1925) : synonym of Zafra microstoma (Thiele, 1925)
- Anachis misera (G. B. Sowerby I, 1844): synonym of Anachis miser (G. B. Sowerby I, 1844) (miser is a noun in apposition, thus does not agree in gender with genus name)
- Anachis moleculina (Duclos, 1840) : synonym of Mitrella moleculina (Duclos, 1840)
- Anachis nigricans (Sowerby, 1844): synonym of Parvanachis nigricans (G. B. Sowerby I, 1844)
- Anachis obesa (C. B. Adams, 1845) : synonym of Parvanachis obesa (C. B. Adams, 1845)
- Anachis ostreicola (G. B. Sowerby III, 1882) : synonym of Parvanachis ostreicola (G. B. Sowerby III, 1882)
- Anachis paessleri (Strebel, 1905) : synonym of Parvanachis paessleri (Strebel, 1905) (superseded combination)
- Anachis paumotensis (Tryon, 1883) : synonym of Mitropsis paumotensis (Tryon, 1883)
- Anachis peasei (E. von Martens & Langkavel, 1871) : synonym of Seminella peasei (E. von Martens & Langkavel, 1871) (superseded combination)
- Anachis peassleri [sic] : synonym of Parvanachis paessleri (Strebel, 1905) (misspelling)
- Anachis penicillata P. P. Carpenter, 1864 : synonym of Zanassarina penicillata (P. P. Carpenter, 1864) (superseded combination)
- Anachis pretrii (Duclos, 1846) : synonym of Suturoglypta pretrii (Duclos, 1846)
- † Anachis problematica Laws, 1944: synonym of † Costoanachis problematica (Laws, 1944) (superseded combination)
- Anachis pulchella H. de Blainville, 1829 – America: synonym of Falsuszafrona pulchella (Blainville, 1829)
- Anachis pygmaea Sowerby, 1832: synonym of Parvanachis pygmaea (G. B. Sowerby I, 1832)
- Anachis radwini Altena, 1975: synonym of Parvanachis obesa (C. B. Adams, 1845)
- Anachis rehderi Hertlein & A. M. Strong, 1951: synonym of Cosmioconcha rehderi (Hertlein & A. M. Strong, 1951) (original combination)
- Anachis retiaria (Tomlin, 1931) : synonym of Smithena retiaria (Tomlin, 1931) (superseded combination)
- Anachis rubra (E. von Martens, 1881): synonym of Mitrella rubra (E. von Martens, 1881) (unaccepted > superseded combination)
- Anachis rufotinct P. P. Carpenter, 1857: synonym of Parvanachis diminuta (C. B. Adams, 1852)
- Anachis samanensis Dall, 1889: synonym of Suturoglypta pretrii (Duclos, 1846) (junior subjective synonym)
- Anachis scutulata (Reeve, 1859): synonym of Costoanachis scutulata (Reeve, 1859)
- Anachis semiplicata Stearns, 1873: synonym of Costoanachis semiplicata (Stearns, 1873) (original combination)
- Anachis serrata P. P. Carpenter, 1857 : synonym of Decipifus serratus (P. P. Carpenter, 1857) (original combination)
- Anachis sertulariarum (d'Orbigny, 1839) : synonym of Costoanachis sertulariarum (A. d'Orbigny, 1839) (superseded combination)
- Anachis similis 1Ravenel, 186 : synonym of Costoanachis similis (Ravenel, 1861)
- Anachis sparsa (Reeve, 1859): synonym of Costoanachis sparsa (Reeve, 1859)
- Anachis stimpsoni (Bartsch, 1915): synonym of Costoanachis stimpsoni (Bartsch, 1915) (superseded combination)
- Anachis subcostulata (C. B. Adams, 1845): synonym of Zafrona pulchella (Blainville, 1829) : synonym of Falsuszafrona pulchella (Blainville, 1829)
- Anachis subturrita P. P. Carpenter, 1864: synonym of Exaesopus subturritus (P. P. Carpenter, 1864) (original combination)
- Anachis tabogensis Bartsch, 1931: synonym of Anachis lentiginosa (Hinds, 1844)
- Anachis tincta P. P. Carpenter, 1864: synonym of Steironepion tinctum (P. P. Carpenter, 1864) (superseded combination)
- Anachis translirata (Ravenel, 1861): synonym of Costoanachis translirata (Ravenel, 1861)
- Anachis ursula (Thiele, 1925): synonym of Zafrona ursula (Thiele, 1925)
- Anachis vitula (Barnard, 1959): synonym of Columbella vitula Barnard, 1959
- Anachis whitei Bartsch, 1928: synonym of Nassarina whitei (Bartsch, 1928) (original combination)
