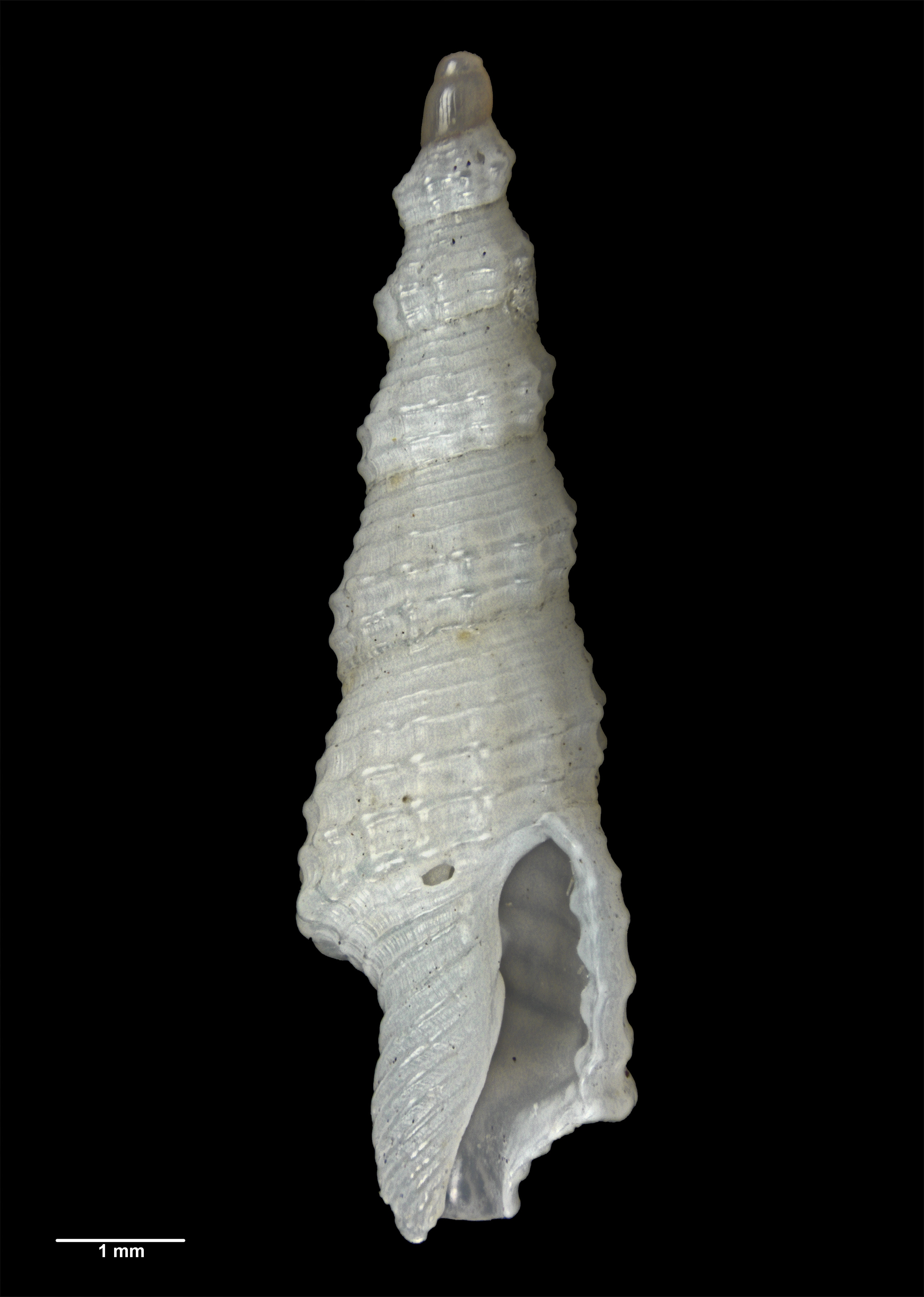
- Holotype of E. hipkinsi

Scientific classification
- Kingdom: Animalia
- Phylum: Mollusca
- Class: Gastropoda
- Subclass: Caenogastropoda
- Order: Neogastropoda
- Superfamily: Buccinoidea
- Family: Columbellidae
- Genus: Exomilopsis
- Species: E. hipkinsi

Binomial name
- Exomilopsis hipkinsi A. W. B. Powell, 1964

= Exomilopsis hipkinsi =

Species of gastropod

Exomilopsis hipkinsi is a species of minute gastropod mollusc belonging to the family Columbellidae. It is endemic to New Zealand, known to occur in northwestern Northland Region and in the waters surrounding Manawatāwhi / Three Kings Islands.

== Description ==
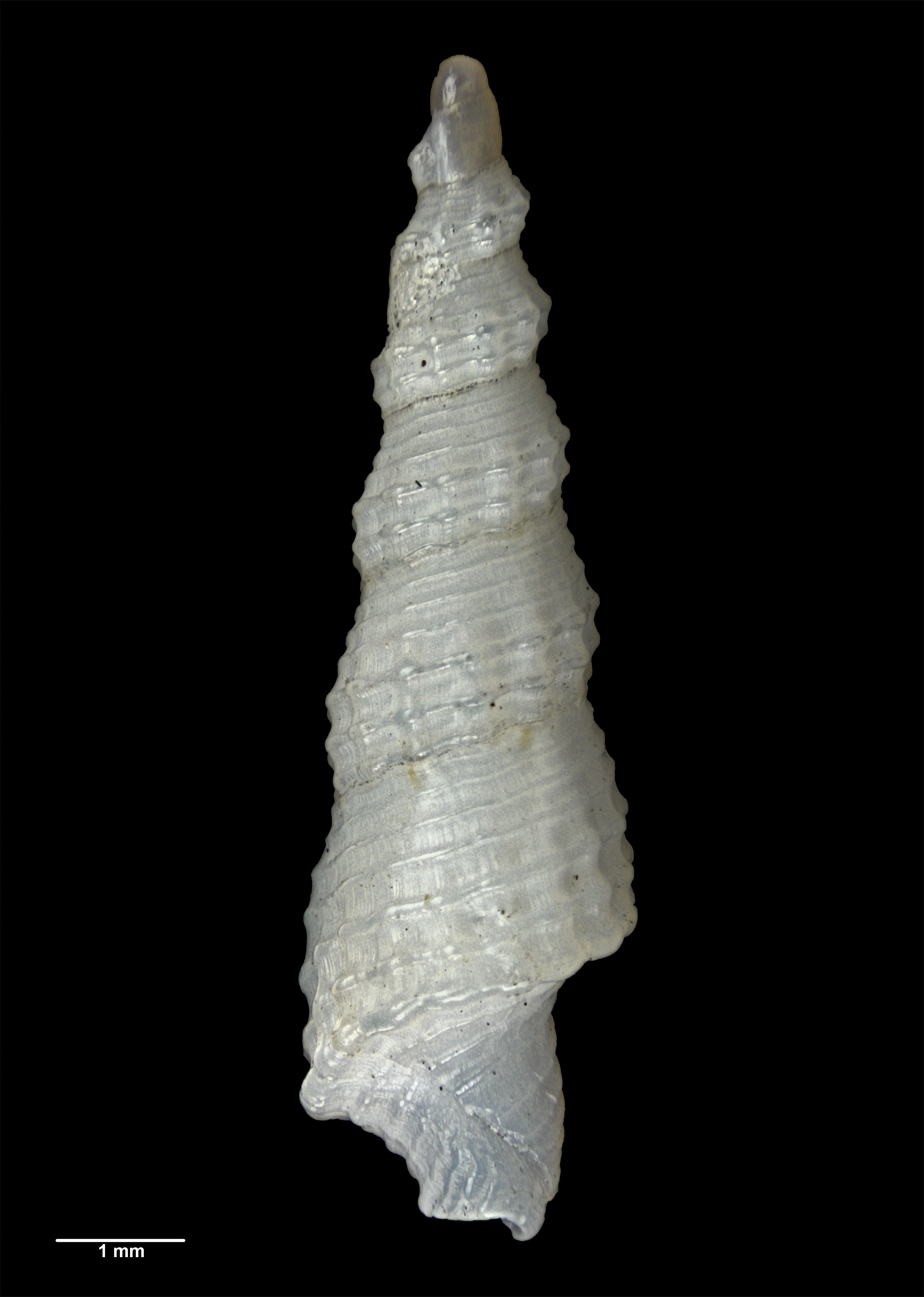
Reverse view of holotype of E. hipkinsi

In the original description, Powell described the genus as below:

Shell small, white, attenuated, with tall spire, twice height of aperture plus canal. Whorls 5, plus a tall narrowly conic to pupoid protoconch of 2½-3 whorls, tip small, globose, slightly asymmetric; succeeding whorls tall with lightly convex outlines and terminated abruptly with a vertical slightly variced lip; smooth and glossy but showing faint axial threads over the last whorl. Post-nuclear whorls loosely coiled, sculptured with distinct to prominent spiral cords, those from the middle of each whorl downward, rendered regularly gemmate by otherwise weak axials. In detail, the spire whorls are sculptured above with three narrowly rounded spiral cords with interspaces of slightly greater width. The middle of each whorl is weakly angulated by the uppermost of three stronger and regularly gemmate spiral cords. On the body-whorl, the lowest of the three gemmate cords, which is just emergent at the lower suture, becomes the most prominent and forms a peripheral flange, below which the base is deeply excavated. The base is occupied mostly by a disproportionately large and flexuous pillar which is sculptured with 14 crisp narrow cords, widely spaced above but more crowded towards the tip of the canal. The aperture is narrowly quadrate and terminates below in a short broadly open canal. Outer lip with a vertical profile and no vestige of an anal sinus, but variced within, bearing four tubercles. Just below the lowest tubercle the outer lip is strongly angulate at the termination of the lowest carina. The whole surface of the shell, except for the cords, is densely and delicately striated.

The holotype has a height of 9.75 mm (0.384 in), with a width of 2.8 mm (0.11 in).

Powell noted differences between the species and E. spica, namely that E. spica had two spirals in the carina and only 6-7 on the base, gemmate spirals, and that the species had stronger axials.

== Taxonomy ==
The species was first described by A. W. B. Powell in 1964, in the same paper where he described the genus Exomilopsis. It was named after Ken Hipkins, former President of the Conchology Section (Auckland Shell Club).

== Distribution and habitat ==
E. hipkinsi is endemic to New Zealand, found in waters near Cape Maria van Diemen, and around Manawatāwhi / Three Kings Islands. Specimens have been found at a depth ranging between 15–622 m (49–2,041 ft).
