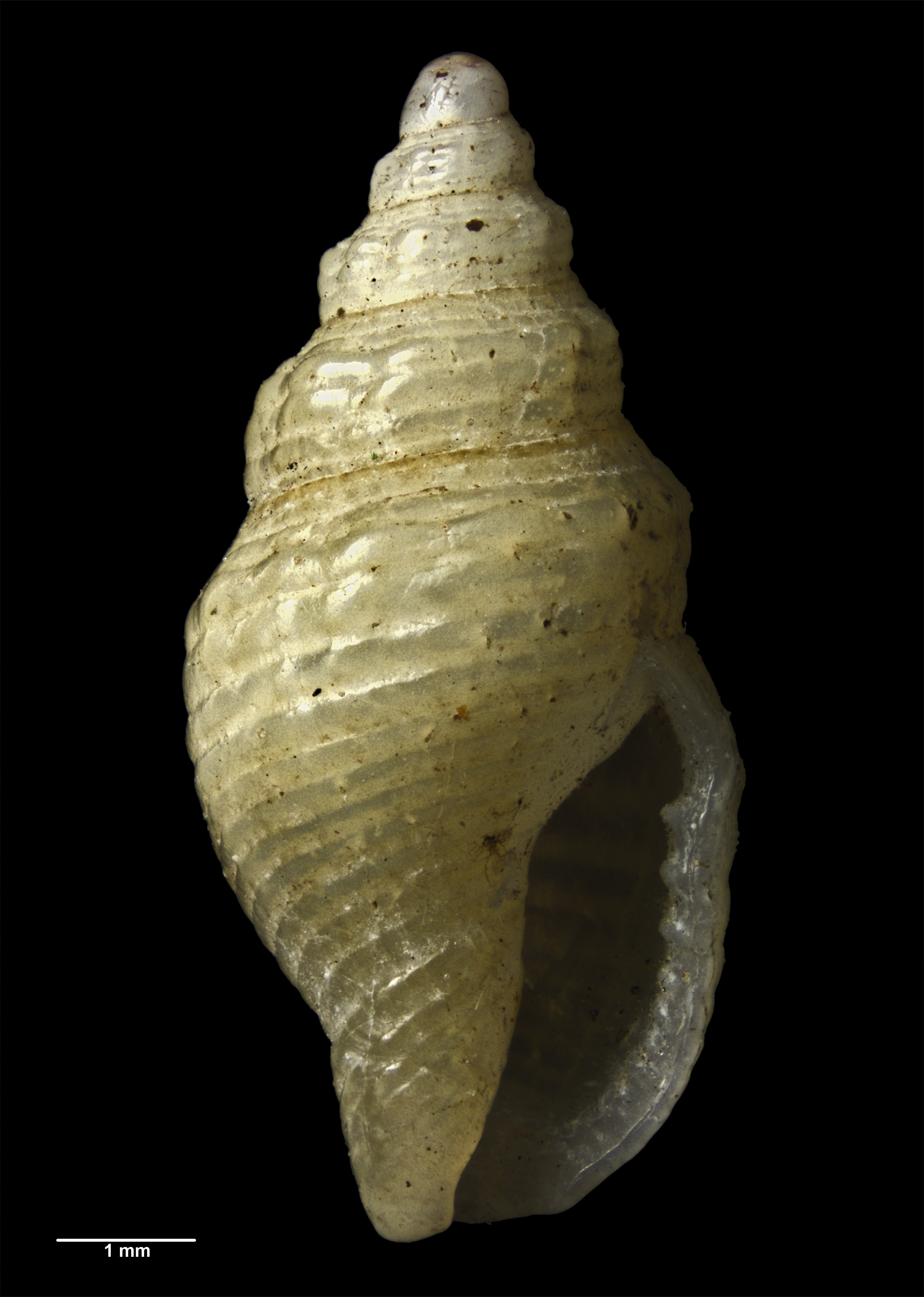
- Holotype of Macrozafra mariae from Auckland War Memorial Museum

Scientific classification
- Domain: Eukaryota
- Kingdom: Animalia
- Phylum: Mollusca
- Class: Gastropoda
- Subclass: Caenogastropoda
- Order: Neogastropoda
- Family: Columbellidae
- Genus: Macrozafra
- Species: M. mariae

Binomial name
- Macrozafra mariae (Powell, 1940)

= Macrozafra mariae =

Species of gastropod

Macrozafra mariae is a species of marine gastropod mollusc in the family Columbellidae. It was first described by Baden Powell in 1940. It is endemic to the waters of New Zealand.

== Description ==
Macrozafra mariae has a relatively large shell compared to other members of the Macrozafra genus. The shell is ovate and spirally grooved, with weak axial folds. The shell is a full white colour, with the holotype measuring 8.6mm by 4mm.

== Distribution ==
The species is Endemic to New Zealand. The holotype was collected from Cape Maria van Diemen in the Northland Region, New Zealand.
