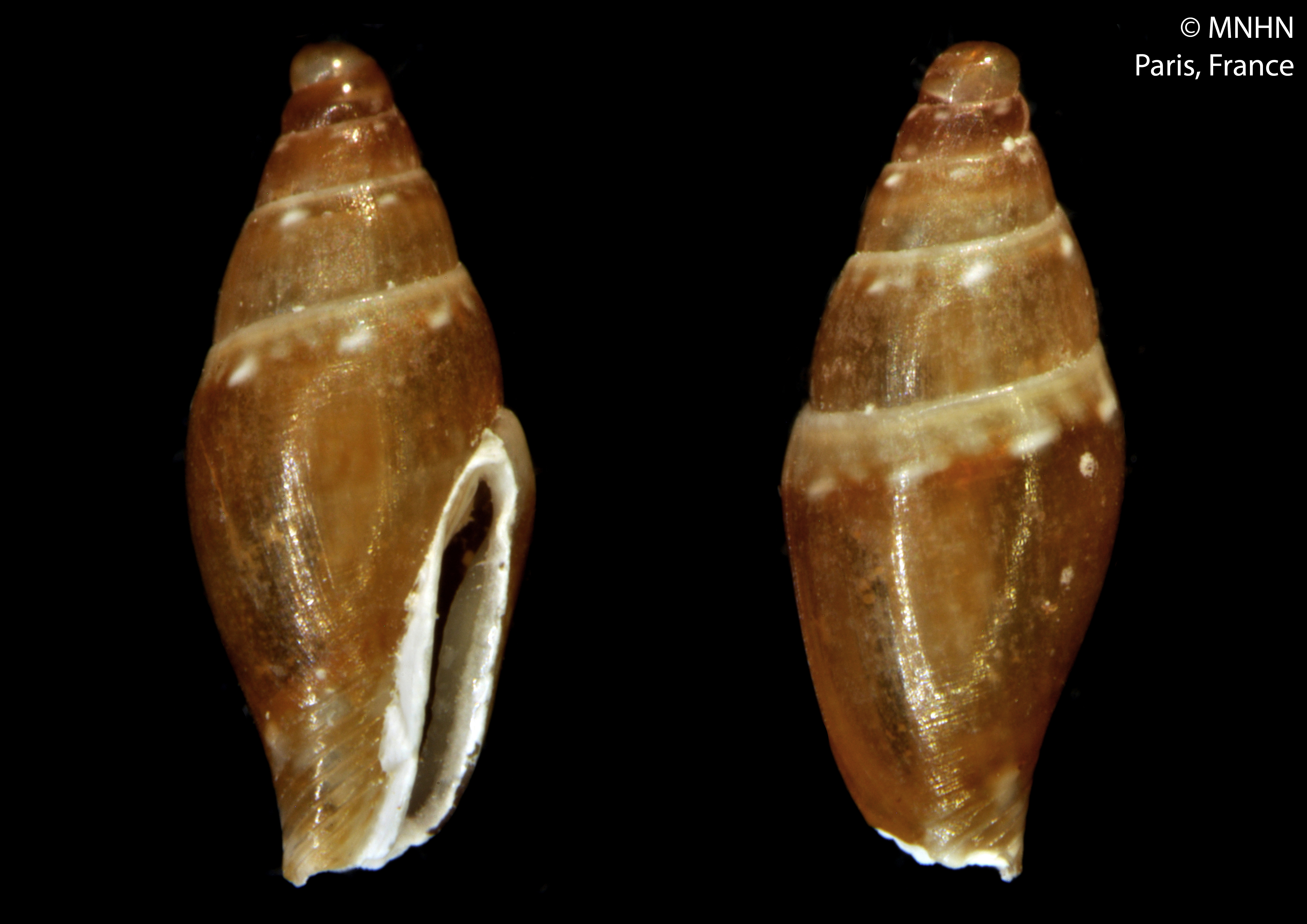
- Shell of Ascalista letourneuxi (specimen at MNHN, Paris)

Scientific classification
- Kingdom: Animalia
- Phylum: Mollusca
- Class: Gastropoda
- Subclass: Caenogastropoda
- Order: Neogastropoda
- Superfamily: Buccinoidea
- Family: Columbellidae
- Genus: Ascalista
- Species: A. letourneuxi

Binomial name
- Ascalista letourneuxi K. Monsecour & D. Monsecour, 2015

= Ascalista letourneuxi =

Species of gastropod

Ascalista letourneuxi is a species of sea snail in the family Columbellidae.

== Distribution ==
This marine species occurs off the Austral Islands, French Polynesia.
