= Bathyglypta procera =

Scientific classification
- Kingdom: Animalia
- Phylum: Mollusca
- Class: Gastropoda
- Subclass: Caenogastropoda
- Order: Neogastropoda
- Family: Columbellidae
- Genus: Bathyglypta
- Species: B. procera

Binomial name
- Bathyglypta procera (Simone & Gracia C., )

Synonyms
- Suturoglypta procera Simone & Gracia, 2006 (original combination)

Species of gastropod

Bathyglypta procera is a species of sea snail, a marine gastropod mollusk in the family Columbellidae, the dove snails.
