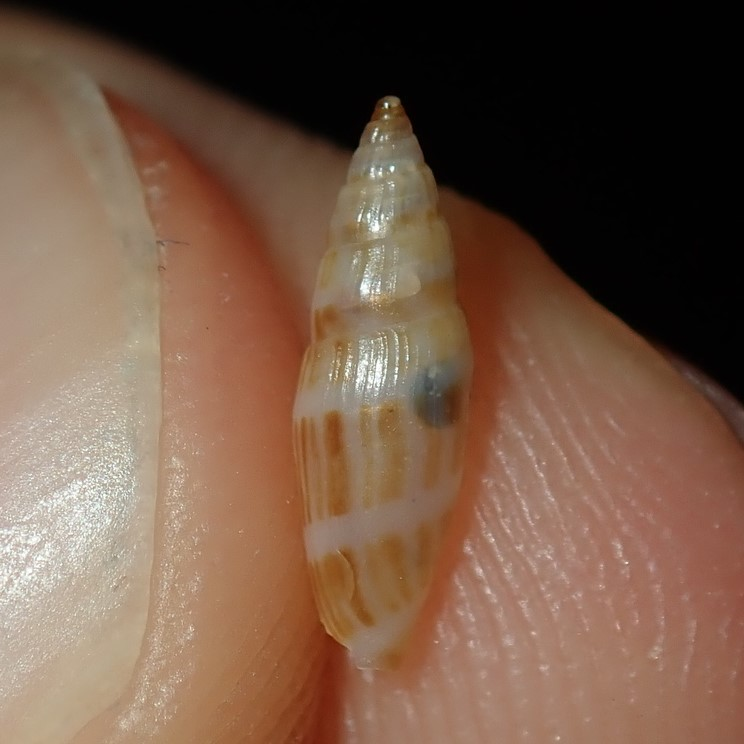

Scientific classification
- Kingdom: Animalia
- Phylum: Mollusca
- Class: Gastropoda
- Subclass: Caenogastropoda
- Order: Neogastropoda
- Family: Columbellidae
- Genus: Parviterebra
- Species: P. brazieri

Binomial name
- Parviterebra brazieri (Angas, 1875)

Synonyms
- List: Daphnella harrisoni (Tenison Woods, 1878); Euryta brazieri Angas, 1875 (original combination); Euryta pulchella A. Adams & Angas, 1863 (invalid: treated by Tryon as a secondary junior homonym of Terebra pulchella Deshayes, 1857; T. angasi is a replacement name); Mangelia harrisoni Tenison Woods, 1878; Olivella australis Tenison Woods, 1878; Raphitoma brazieri Angas, 1875; Raphitoma pulchella Adams & Angas, 1863; Terebra (Euryta) angasi Tryon, 1885; Terebra angasi Tryon, 1885

= Parviterebra brazieri =

Species of gastropod

Parviterebra brazieri is a species of sea snail in the family Columbellidae. This marine species is endemic to marine waters around Australia, where it occurs off Victoria.

== Description ==
The length of the shell attains 14 mm, its diameter 4 mm.

(Original description) The shell is narrowly fusiform, attenuate at both ends. Its aspect is smooth, graceful, thin and translucent. The spire is prominent, acute, equalling the aperture, milky white. The base of the shell is chesnut, but the apex is stained, fulvous, and on the body whorl zoned with four bands of very pale yellow. The shell contains eight whorls, sloping, obliquely ribbed. The ribs are smooth, rounded, slightly raised, obtusely angular above, obsolete anteriorly. The suture is well impressed. The aperture is narrow and oblong. The outer lip is thin. The inner lip is reflected.
