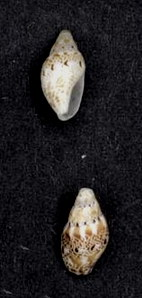
- Two shells of Rhombinella laevigata (museum specimens at Naturalis Biodiversity Center)

Scientific classification
- Kingdom: Animalia
- Phylum: Mollusca
- Class: Gastropoda
- Subclass: Caenogastropoda
- Order: Neogastropoda
- Family: Columbellidae
- Genus: Rhombinella
- Species: R. laevigata

Binomial name
- Rhombinella laevigata (Linnaeus, 1758)

Synonyms
- Buccinum laevigatum Linnaeus, 1758 (original combination); Columbella ala-perdicis Reeve, 1859; Columbella concinna G. B. Sowerby I, 1822; Columbella irrorata Reeve, 1859; Columbella levigata Duclos, 1848; Nitidella laevigata (Linnaeus, 1758); Nitidella laevigata hendersoni Dall, 1908; Nitidella laevigata laevigata (Linnaeus, 1758)

= Rhombinella laevigata =

Species of mollusc

Rhombinella laevigata, common name the smooth dove shell, is a species of sea snail, a marine gastropod mollusk in the family Columbellidae, the dove snails.

== Description ==
The size of the shell varies between 10 mm and 20 mm.

The ovate, oblong shell is smooth, shining, and of a reddish or whitish yellow. It is ornamented with small longitudinal lines, waved, vermiculated or flexuous, of a chestnut color. The epidermis is greenish. The spire is composed of six whorls, the lower larger than all the others together. At the base of each whorl of the spire, is found a transverse band of slightly apparent, articulated black points. A band, more strongly marked, the points of which are more distinctly observable, surrounds the body whorl. The aperture is ovate, subdilated, and smooth. The siphonal canal is short and feebly emarginated. The white columella is nearly straight. The outer lip is smooth, rarely denticulated, white and slightly sharp.

== Distribution ==
This species occurs in the Caribbean Sea, the Gulf of Mexico and off the Lesser Antilles and Puerto Rico.
