= Antimitrella fuscafasciata =

Scientific classification
- Kingdom: Animalia
- Phylum: Mollusca
- Class: Gastropoda
- Subclass: Caenogastropoda
- Order: Neogastropoda
- Family: Columbellidae
- Genus: Antimitrella
- Species: A. fuscafasciata

Binomial name
- Antimitrella fuscafasciata (Lussi, 2009)

Synonyms
- Anachis fuscafasciata Lussi, 2009 (basionym)

Species of gastropod

Antimitrella fuscafasciata is a species of sea snail, a marine gastropod mollusk in the family Columbellidae, the dove snails.

== Description ==
The shell grows to a length of 2.5 mm.

== Distribution ==
This marine species occurs off the East Cape, South Africa.
