= Mokumea mokum =

Scientific classification
- Kingdom: Animalia
- Phylum: Mollusca
- Class: Gastropoda
- Subclass: Caenogastropoda
- Order: Neogastropoda
- Family: Columbellidae
- Genus: Mokumea
- Species: M. mokum

Binomial name
- Mokumea mokum Faber, 2004

Species of gastropod

Mokumea mokum is a species of sea snail, a marine gastropod mollusc in the family Columbellidae, the dove snails.
