= Antimitrella jaci =

Scientific classification
- Kingdom: Animalia
- Phylum: Mollusca
- Class: Gastropoda
- Subclass: Caenogastropoda
- Order: Neogastropoda
- Family: Columbellidae
- Genus: Antimitrella
- Species: A. jaci

Binomial name
- Antimitrella jaci Lussi, 2009

Species of gastropod

Antimitrella jaci is a species of sea snail in the family Columbellidae.
