= Melanella maoria =

- Shell of Melanella maoria

Scientific classification
- Kingdom: Animalia
- Phylum: Mollusca
- Class: Gastropoda
- Subclass: Caenogastropoda
- Order: Littorinimorpha
- Superfamily: Vanikoroidea
- Family: Eulimidae
- Genus: Melanella
- Species: M. maoria

Binomial name
- Melanella maoria (A. W. B. Powell, 1940)

Synonyms
- Balcis maoria A. W. B. Powell, 1940 (superseded combination)

Species of gastropod

Melanella maoria is a species of sea snail, a marine gastropod mollusk in the family Eulimidae.

== Description ==
The length of the shell attains 19 mm, its diameter 6 mm.

(Original description) The shell is large for the genus. It is solid, white, and porcellanous. The spire is tall, measuring 2 ½ times the height of the aperture. The upper spire is only very slightly curved. There are 10 whorls (with the tip of the protoconch missing). The outline of the whorls is very slightly sinuous, ranging from lightly convex to almost straight except for a slight concavity below the linear suture, which is rendered somewhat appressed. The body whorl is large, and its periphery is convex. The aperture is pyriform. The outer lip is thick but not variced, and its profile is sinuous, with a slight concavity below the suture. Labial growth stages occur at intervals of approximately two-thirds of a whorl; thus, they do not fall in line. The body whorl is less than half the total height of the shell.

== Distribution ==
This marine species is endemic to New Zealand and accors off Cape Maria van Diemen.
