= Melanella truncata =

- Shell of Melanella truncata (original image)

Scientific classification
- Kingdom: Animalia
- Phylum: Mollusca
- Class: Gastropoda
- Subclass: Caenogastropoda
- Order: Littorinimorpha
- Superfamily: Vanikoroidea
- Family: Eulimidae
- Genus: Melanella
- Species: M. truncata

Binomial name
- Melanella truncata (Suter, 1908)

Synonyms
- Eulima truncata Suter, 1908 (superseded combination)

Species of gastropod

Melanella truncata is a species of sea snail, a marine gastropod mollusk in the family Eulimidae.

== Description ==
The length of the shell attains 3 mm; its diameter 1 mm.

(Original description) This shell is very small, subcylindrical, thin, and polished, as well as semi-transparent and straight. There is no sculpture and there are no varices. The color is white. The spire is very narrowly conic, and it is a little more than twice the height of the aperture; the outlines are straight. The protoconch is high and obtusely rounded. There are 5 whorls, which are regularly increasing and flat; the base is flattish and elongated. The suture is linear, superficial, and false-margined below. The aperture is subvertical, lanceolar, high and narrow, and it is sharply angled above and acuminate below. The outer lip is straight above and rounded towards the base, and it is thin and sharp. The columella is short and truncated at the base; the parietal wall is slightly concave.

== Distribution ==
This marine species is endemic to New Zealand and occurs off Cape Maria van Diemen at depths between 0 m and 70 m.
