= Antimitrella lamellosa =

Scientific classification
- Kingdom: Animalia
- Phylum: Mollusca
- Class: Gastropoda
- Subclass: Caenogastropoda
- Order: Neogastropoda
- Family: Columbellidae
- Genus: Antimitrella
- Species: A. lamellosa

Binomial name
- Antimitrella lamellosa Lussi, 2009

Species of gastropod

Antimitrella lamellosa is a species of sea snail, a marine gastropod mollusk in the family Columbellidae, the dove snails.
