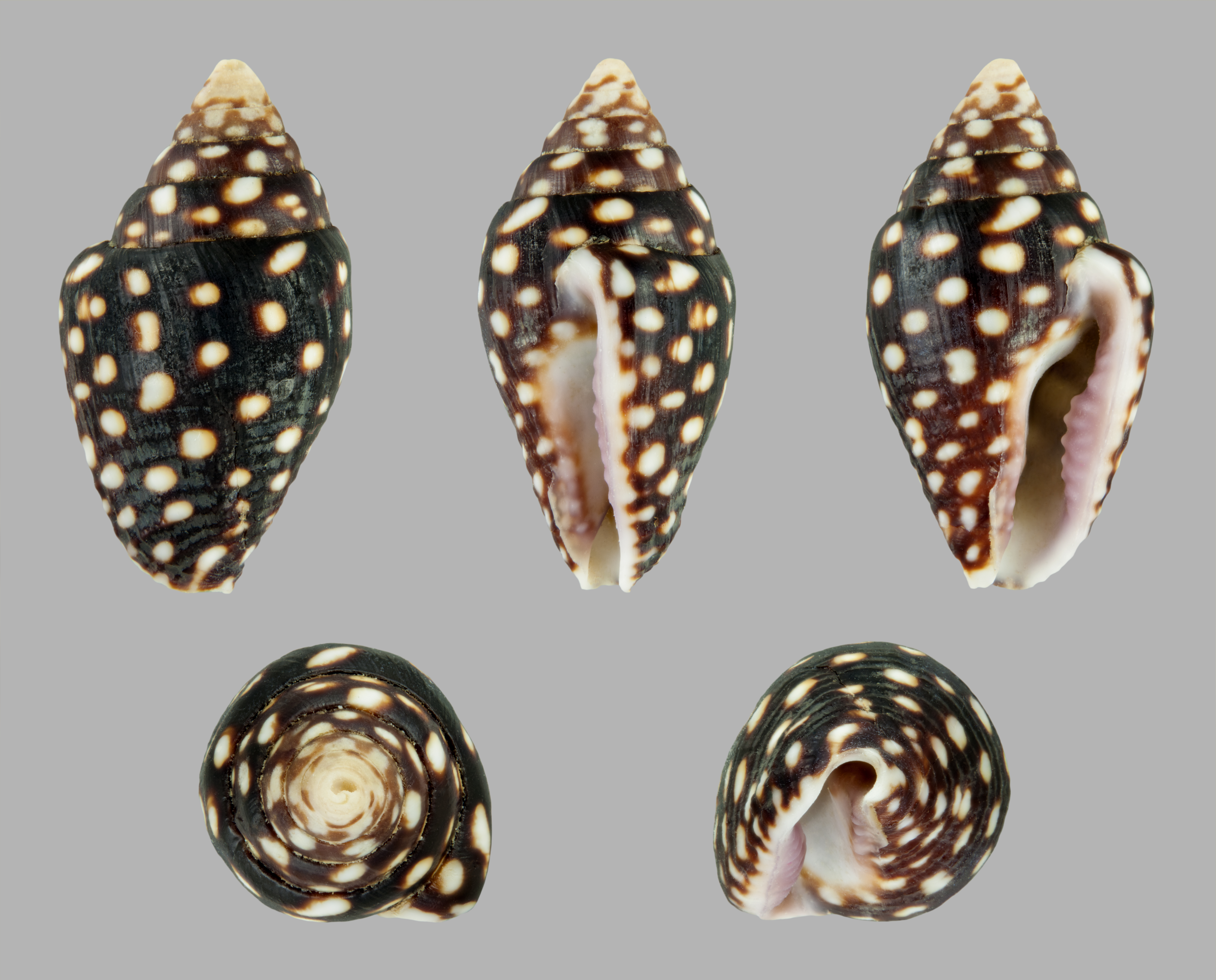

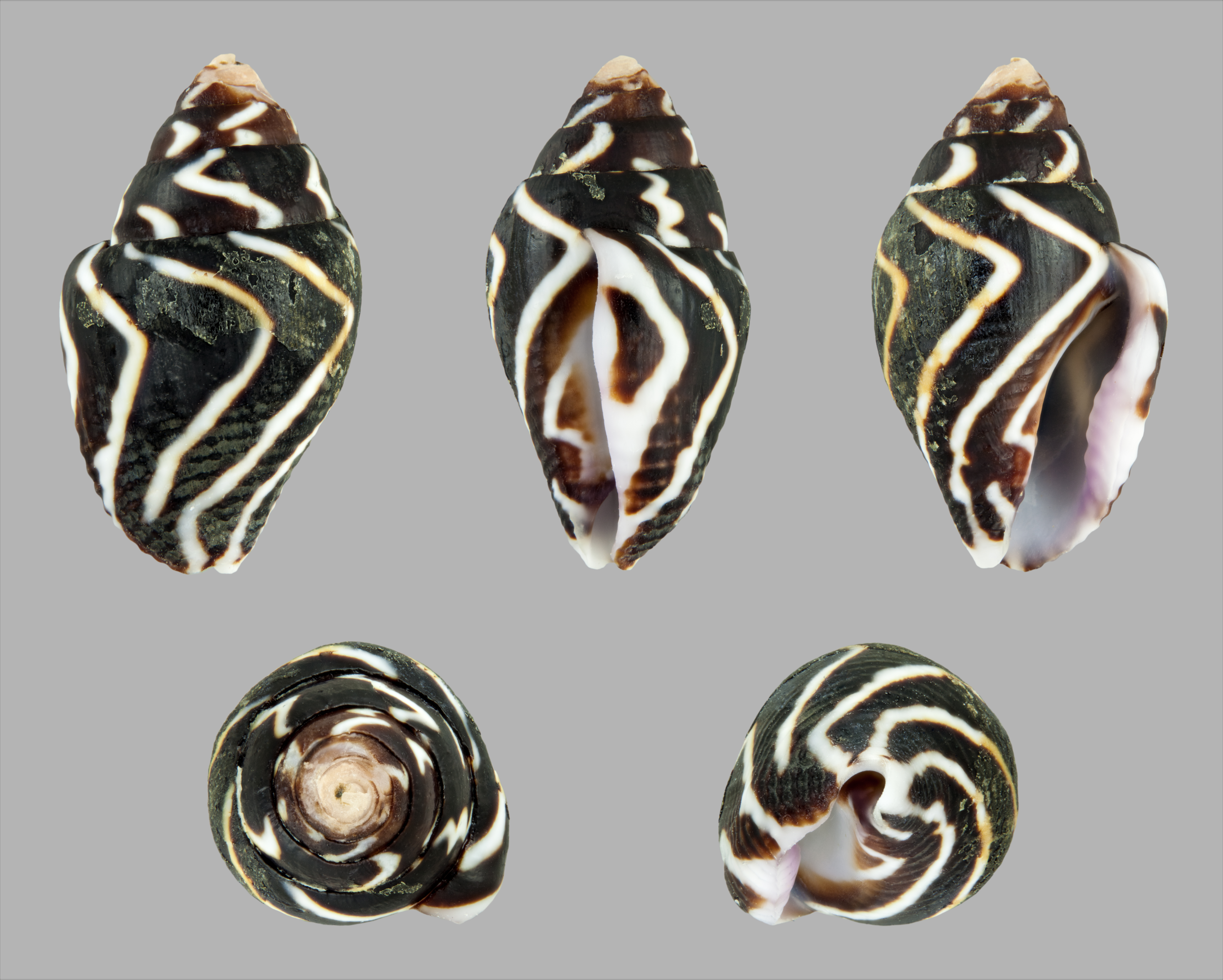

Scientific classification
- Kingdom: Animalia
- Phylum: Mollusca
- Class: Gastropoda
- Subclass: Caenogastropoda
- Order: Neogastropoda
- Family: Columbellidae
- Genus: Pictocolumbella
- Species: P. ocellata

Binomial name
- Pictocolumbella ocellata (Link, 1807)

Synonyms
- Columbella fulgurans Lamarck, 1822; Columbella fulgurans fulgurans Dupuis, 1931; Columbella fulgurans var. albocincta Friedrick, 1957; Columbella fulgurans var. eufulgurans Melvill & Standen, 1899; Columbella fuliginosa Dupuis, 1931; Columbella mitriformis King & Broderip, 1831; Columbella ocellata Link, 1807 (basionym); Columbella punctata Lamarck, 1822; Pyrene ocellata (Link, 1807)

= Pictocolumbella ocellata =

Species of gastropod

Pictocolumbella ocellata, or the lightning dove shell, is a species of sea snail, a marine gastropod mollusk in the family Columbellidae, the dove snails.

== Description ==
The shell size varies between 13 mm and 20 mm. The colour of the shell is commonly a dark brown colour, but it can also be red or orange. The pattern on the outside of the shell varies between zigzags, small spots, and triangle-like shapes all in a white or yellowish colour. The tip of the shell is white; near the opening it turns into a pinkish colour.

== Distribution ==
This species is distributed in the Indian Ocean along Madagascar and in the Western Pacific (in warm tropical water).

The lightning dove shell lives on sandy and muddy bottoms, and the shell colour varies greatly.
