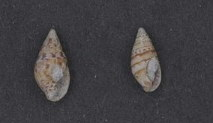
- Two shells of Pseudamycla dermestoidea (museum specimens at Naturalis Biodiversity Center)

Scientific classification
- Kingdom: Animalia
- Phylum: Mollusca
- Class: Gastropoda
- Subclass: Caenogastropoda
- Order: Neogastropoda
- Family: Columbellidae
- Genus: Pseudamycla
- Species: P. dermestoidea

Binomial name
- Pseudamycla dermestoidea (Lamarck, 1822)

Synonyms
- Buccinum dermestoideum Lamarck, 1822 (original combination); Columbella (Mitrella) lineolata Tryon, 1883; Columbella maculosa Pease, 1871

= Pseudamycla dermestoidea =

Species of gastropod

Pseudamycla dermestoidea is a species of sea snail, a marine gastropod mollusk in the family Columbellidae, the dove snails.

== Description ==
The length of the shell varies between 5 mm and 10 mm.

The small shell is ovate, oblong, smooth and polished. The whitish, somewhat obtuse spire is composed of five or six slightly convex whorls. It is covered with small, ocellated, reddish points, forming an indistinct network. The sutures are surrounded above by a small band of alternating white and red spots, while the lower part is marked by another brown band, sometimes broken by distant white spots. The middle of the body whorl is surrounded by a subcrenulated red band, interrupted by white spots. At the base of the whorl are seen transverse striae, and a small brown band. The aperture is ovate. The thin outer lip is slightly denticulated.

== Distribution ==
This species is endemic to Australia and occurs off Western Australia, New South Wales, South Australia, Victoria and Tasmania
