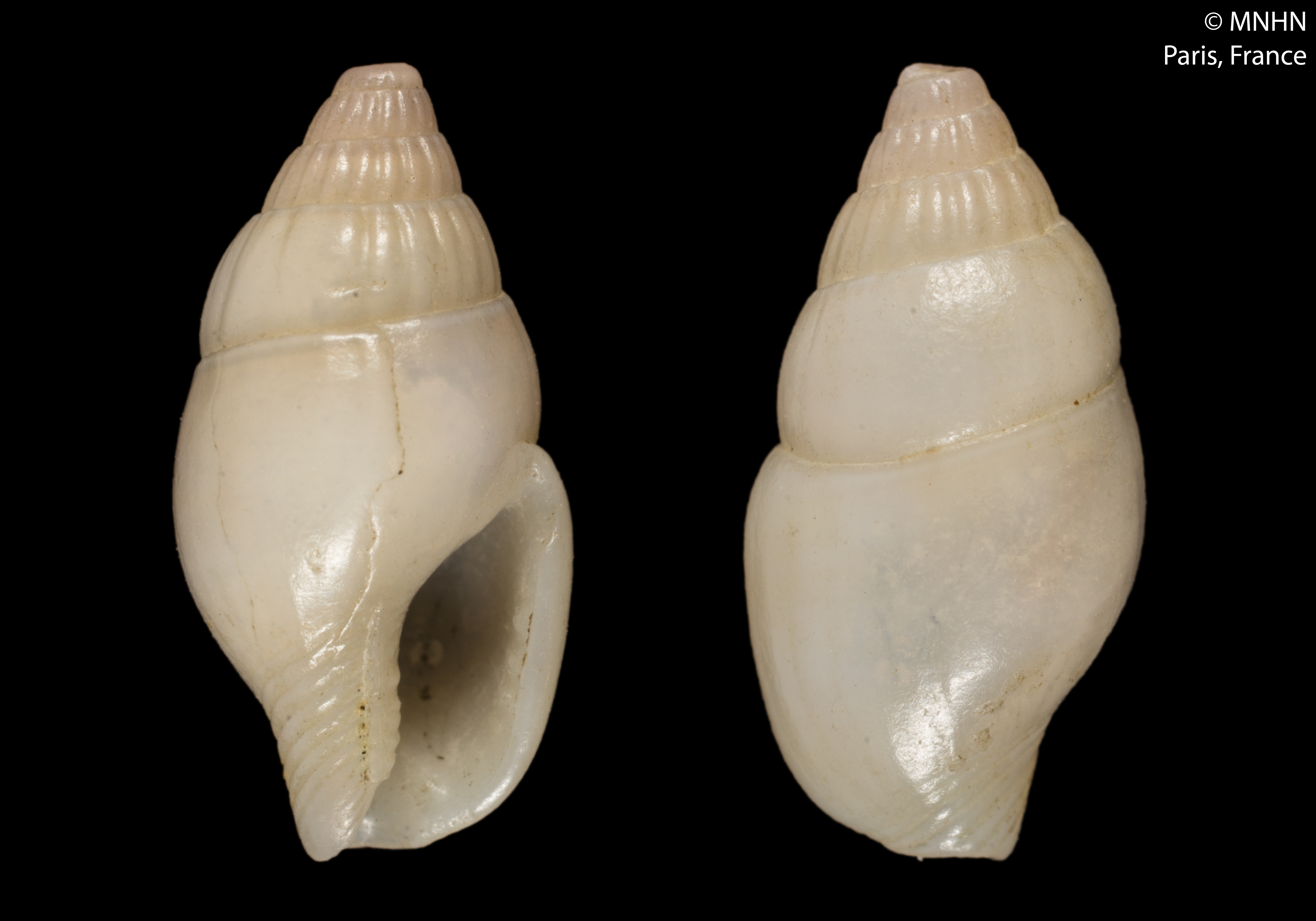
- Shell of Metanachis jaspidea (syntype at MNHN, Paris)

Scientific classification
- Kingdom: Animalia
- Phylum: Mollusca
- Class: Gastropoda
- Subclass: Caenogastropoda
- Order: Neogastropoda
- Superfamily: Buccinoidea
- Family: Columbellidae
- Genus: Metanachis; Thiele, 1924

Type species
- Columbella jaspidea G. B. Sowerby I, 1844

Synonyms
- Columbella (Metanachis) Thiele, 1924 (original rank)

= Metanachis =

Genus of gastropods

Metanachis is a genus of sea snails, marine gastropod mollusks in the family Columbellidae, the dove snails.

== Species ==
- Metanachis jaspidea (G. B. Sowerby I, 1844)
- Metanachis laingensis Sleurs, 1985
- Metanachis marquesa (Gaskoin, 1852)
- Metanachis moleculina (Duclos, 1835)
