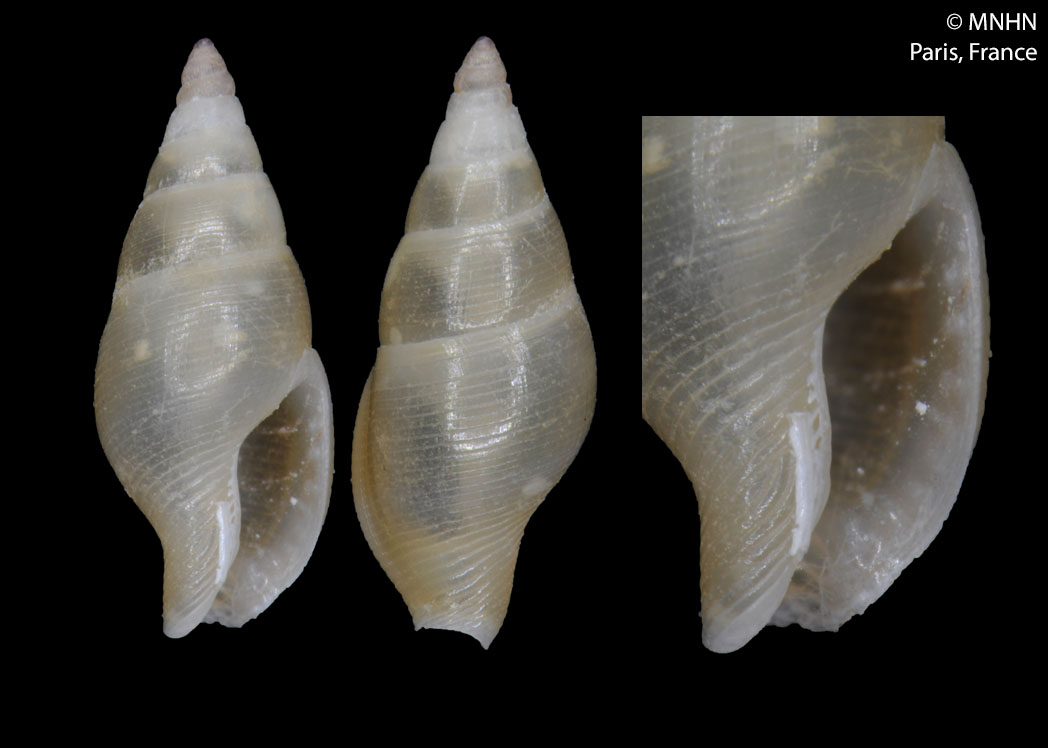
- Shell of Pleurifera suzannae (holotype at MNHN, Paris)

Scientific classification
- Kingdom: Animalia
- Phylum: Mollusca
- Class: Gastropoda
- Subclass: Caenogastropoda
- Order: Neogastropoda
- Superfamily: Buccinoidea
- Family: Columbellidae
- Genus: Pleurifera; Drivas & Jay, 1997 (nec Pleurifera Gramann, 1962)

Type species
- Mitrella suzannae Drivas & Jay, 1990

= Pleurifera =

Genus of gastropods

Pleurifera is a small genus of sea snails in the family Columbellidae.

== Species ==
- Pleurifera flammulata K. Monsecour & D. Monsecour, 2018
- Pleurifera fulgens K. Monsecour & D. Monsecour, 2016
- Pleurifera hawaiiensis K. Monsecour & D. Monsecour, 2019
- Pleurifera lepida K. Monsecour & D. Monsecour, 2016
- Pleurifera suzannae (Drivas & Jay, 1990)
- Pleurifera tenuilabris K. Monsecour & D. Monsecour, 2016
