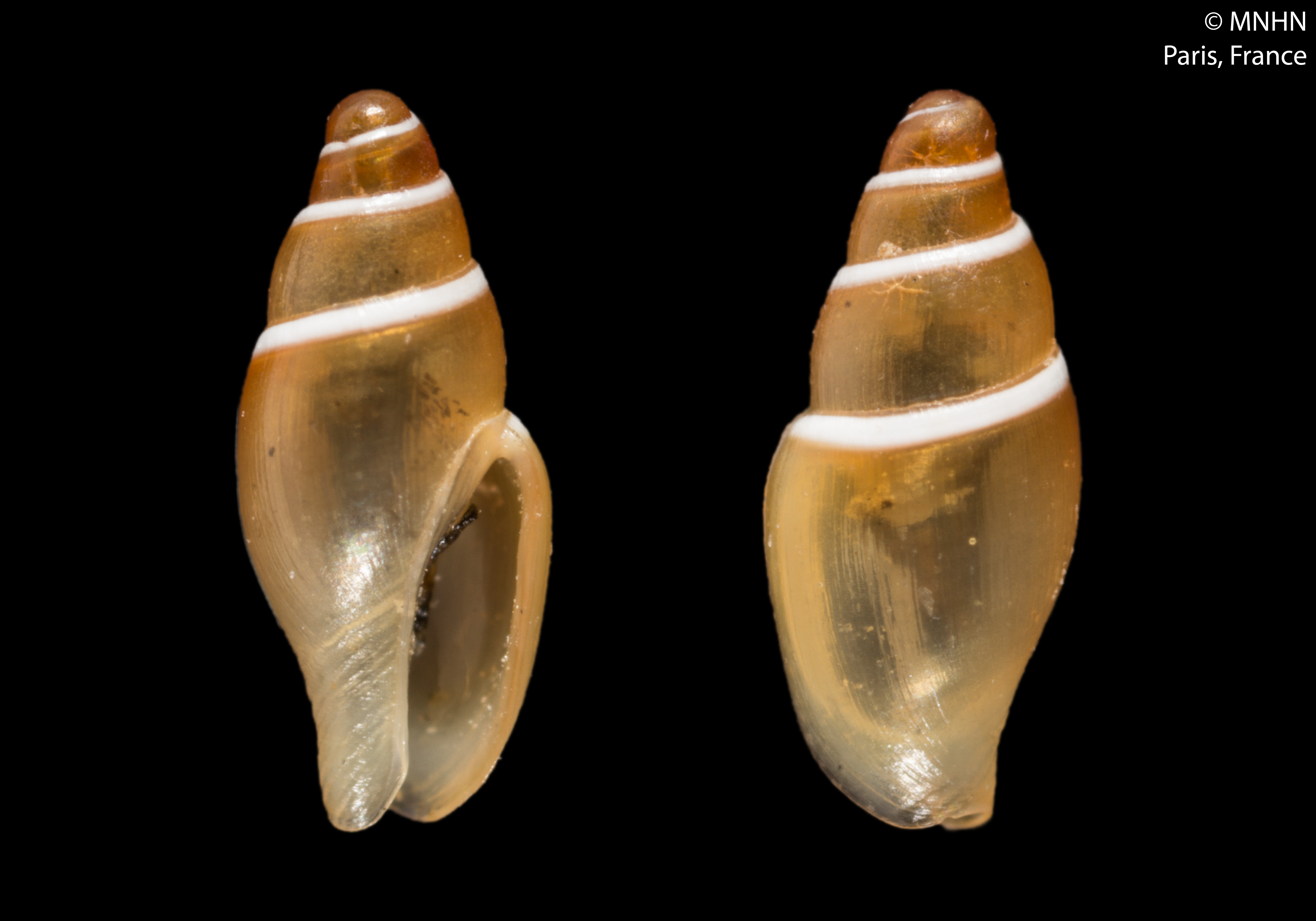
- Mokumea zeleensis

Scientific classification
- Kingdom: Animalia
- Phylum: Mollusca
- Class: Gastropoda
- Subclass: Caenogastropoda
- Order: Neogastropoda
- Superfamily: Buccinoidea
- Family: Columbellidae
- Genus: Mokumea; Habe, 1991

Type species
- Zafra divaricata Pilsbry, 1904

= Mokumea =

Genus of gastropods

Mokumea is a genus of sea snails, marine gastropod mollusks in the family Columbellidae, the dove snails.

== Species ==
Species within the genus Mokumea include:

- Mokumea albomarginata (Ohamoto & Habe, 1979)
- Mokumea albovittata (Lopes, Coelho & Cardoso, 1965)
- Mokumea anceps K. Monsecour & D. Monsecour, 2018
- Mokumea divaricata (Pilsbry, 1904)
- Mokumea fuscolineata (Thiele, 1930)
- Mokumea mokum Faber, 2004
- Mokumea parvula (Viader, 1951)
- Mokumea yuhitai Habe, 1991
- Mokumea zeleensis Drivas & Jay, 1997
