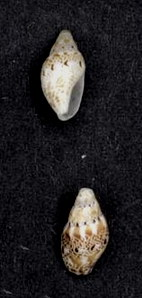
- Rhombinella laevigata

Scientific classification
- Kingdom: Animalia
- Phylum: Mollusca
- Class: Gastropoda
- Subclass: Caenogastropoda
- Order: Neogastropoda
- Family: Columbellidae
- Genus: Rhombinella

= Rhombinella =

Genus of gastropods

Rhombinella is a genus of sea snails, marine gastropod mollusks in the family Columbellidae, the dove snails.

== Species ==
Species within the genus Rhombinella include:

- Rhombinella laevigata (Linnaeus, 1758)
