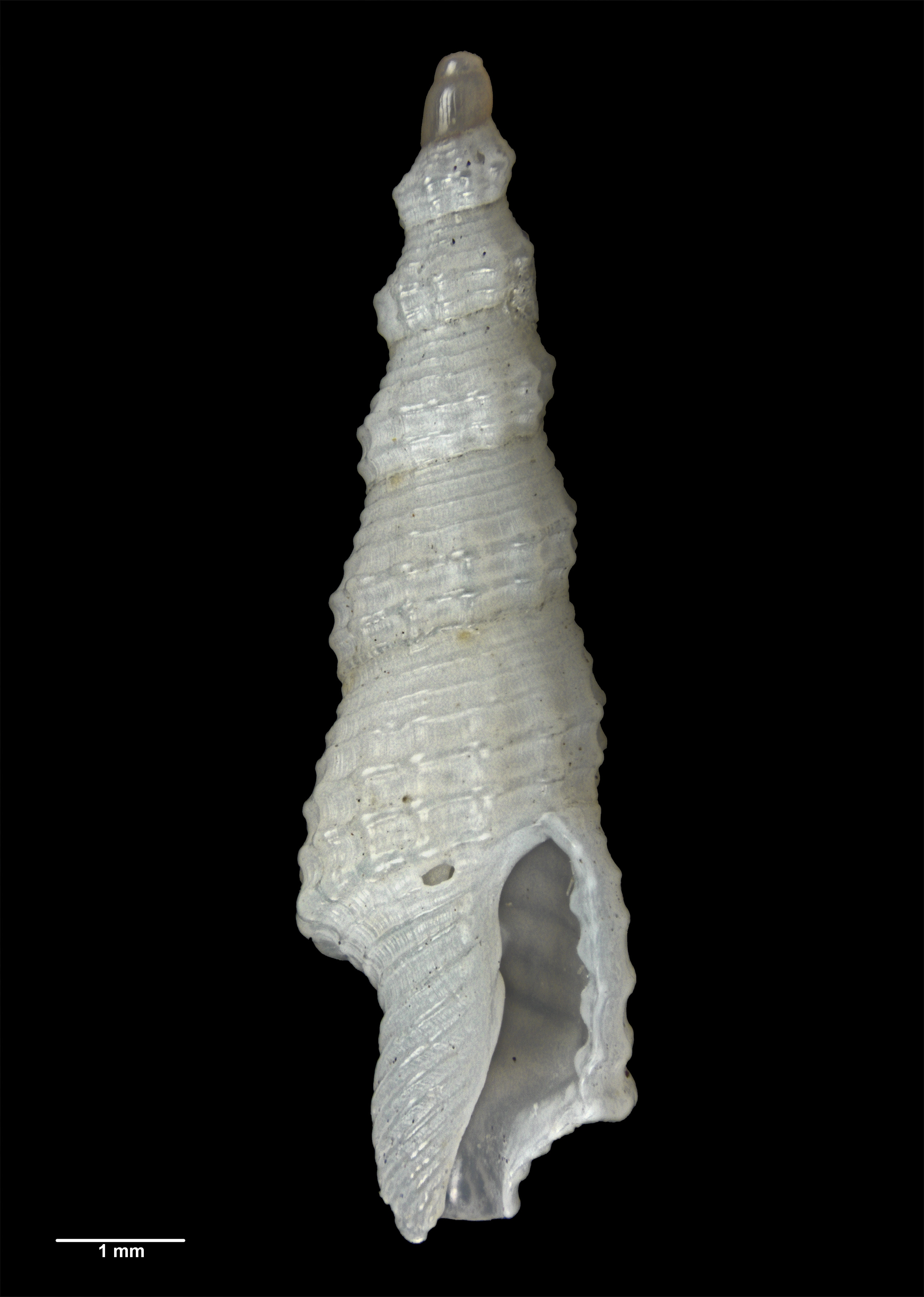
- Holotype of E. hipkinsi

Scientific classification
- Kingdom: Animalia
- Phylum: Mollusca
- Class: Gastropoda
- Subclass: Caenogastropoda
- Order: Neogastropoda
- Superfamily: Buccinoidea
- Family: Columbellidae
- Genus: Exomilopsis; A. W. B. Powell, 1964

Type species
- Mangelia spica

= Exomilopsis =

Genus of gastropods

Exomilopsis is a genus of minute gastropod molluscs belonging to the family Columbellidae. Both species are found in Oceania.

== Description ==
In the original description, Powell described the genus as below:

The new genus Exomulopsis is characterised by its strong superficial resemblance to the Turrid genus Exomilus, i.e. attenuate spire, sagged, low keeled whorls, crossed by axial folds, and a narrow rectangular aperture, but without an anal sinus. The genus Retizafra, to which spica and its allies have most in common, has a fewer whorled more broadly conic protoconch and the shell is of more conventional fusiform shape, the sculpture being axial reticulated by spiral cords.

The genus' tall, conical protoconchs are more similar to barrow forms of columbellids.

== Taxonomy ==
The genus was first described by A. W. B. Powell in 1964, who named Mangelia spica as the type species, and also described a new species in the genus, E. hipkinsi. Boyer et al. (2022) suspect that the genus is likely a synonym of Gatliffena.

== Distribution ==
Exomilopsis is found in the temperate waters of south of Australia and around New Zealand, and is found in Miocene fossils in Victoria, Australia.

== Species ==
Species within the genus Exomilopsis include:

- Exomilopsis hipkinsi A. W. B. Powell, 1964
- Exomilopsis spica (Hedley, 1907)
