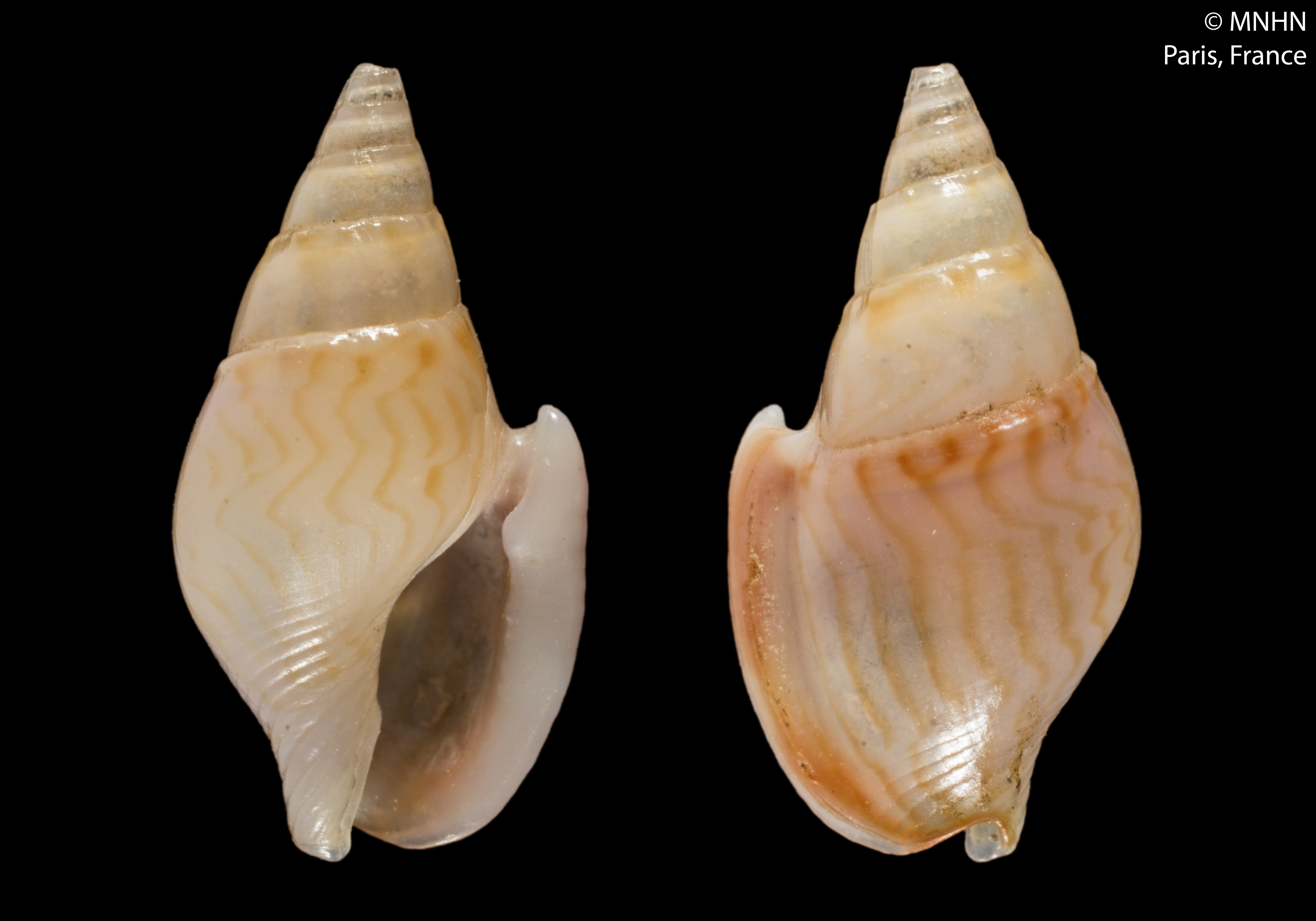
- Shell of Bifurcium bicanaliferum (syntype at MNHN, Paris)

Scientific classification
- Kingdom: Animalia
- Phylum: Mollusca
- Class: Gastropoda
- Subclass: Caenogastropoda
- Order: Neogastropoda
- Family: Columbellidae
- Genus: Bifurcium; P. Fischer, 1884
- Species: B. bicanaliferum

Binomial name
- Bifurcium bicanaliferum (G. B. Sowerby I, 1832)

= Bifurcium =

Genus of gastropods

Bifurcium is a genus of sea snails in the family Columbellidae, the dove snails. There is one species in the genus, Bifurcium bicanaliferum. The type species was found off the Galapagos Islands.
