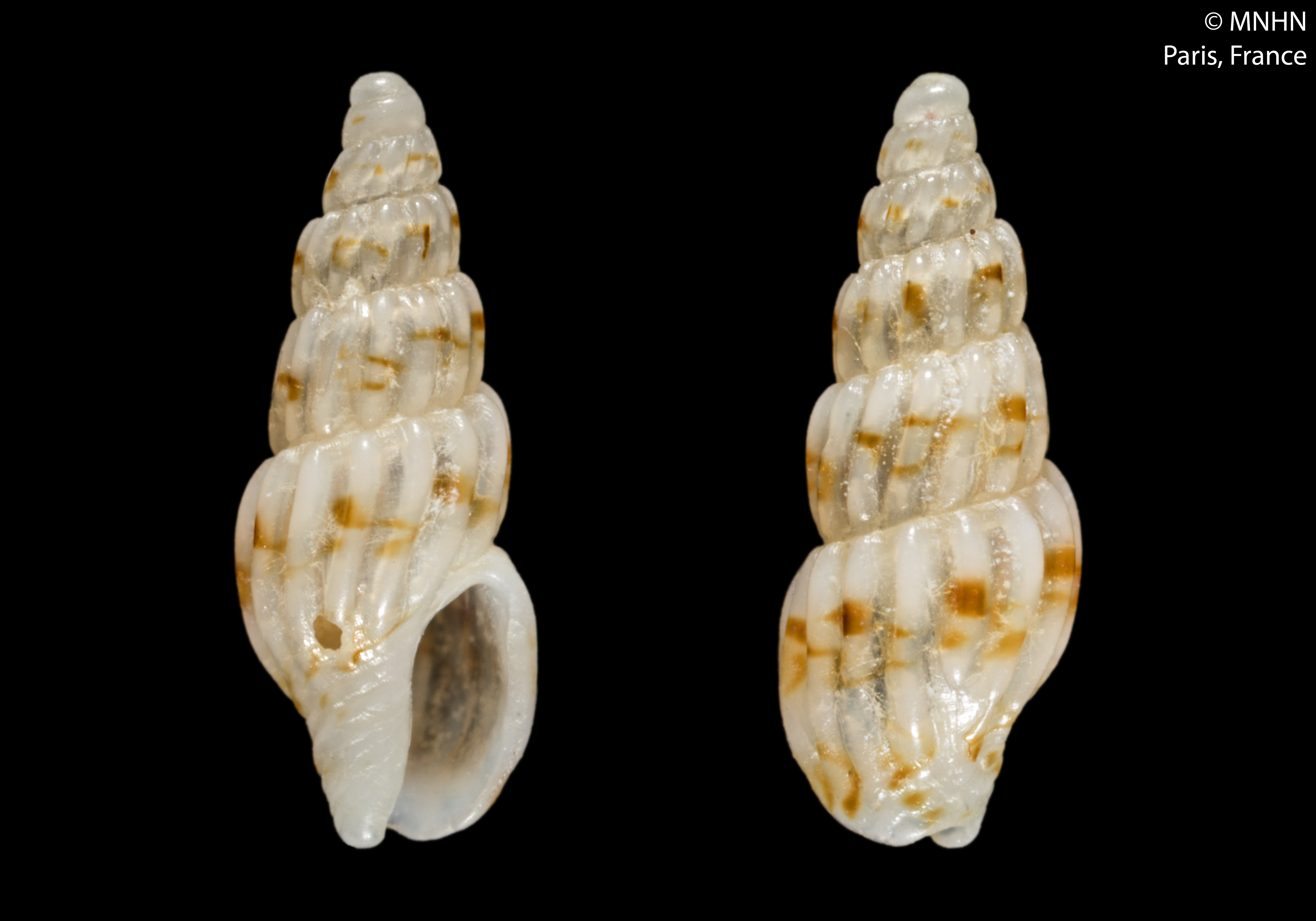
- Shell of Smithena altispira (holotype at MNHN, Paris)

Scientific classification
- Kingdom: Animalia
- Phylum: Mollusca
- Class: Gastropoda
- Subclass: Caenogastropoda
- Order: Neogastropoda
- Superfamily: Buccinoidea
- Family: Columbellidae
- Genus: Smithena; Boyer, Pelorce & Gori, 2022

Type species
- Pleurotoma (Defrancia) trifilosa E. A. Smith, 1882

= Smithena =

Genus of gastropods

Smithena is a genus of sea snails, marine gastropod mollusks in the family Columbellidae; the dove snails.

== Species ==
Species within the genus Smithena include:

- Smithena alfredensis (Bartsch, 1915)
- Smithena altispira (Bozzetti, 2008)
- Smithena omanensis Perugia, 2023
- Smithena retiaria (Tomlin, 1931)
- Smithena trifilosa (E. A. Smith, 1882)
