= Columbellidae incertae sedis mariato =

Scientific classification
- Kingdom: Animalia
- Phylum: Mollusca
- Class: Gastropoda
- (unranked): clade Caenogastropoda clade Hypsogastropoda clade Neogastropoda
- Superfamily: Buccinoidea
- Family: Columbellidae
- Genus: incertae sedis
- Species: ? mariato

Binomial name
- ? mariato (Pilsbry & Lowe, 1932)

Synonyms
- Duplicaria mariato (Pilsbry & H. N. Lowe, 1932); Euterebra mariato (Pilsbry & H. N. Lowe, 1932); Terebra mariato Pilsbry & Lowe, 1932

Species of gastropod

Columbellidae incertae sedis mariato is a species of sea snail, a marine gastropod mollusk in the family Columbellidae.
