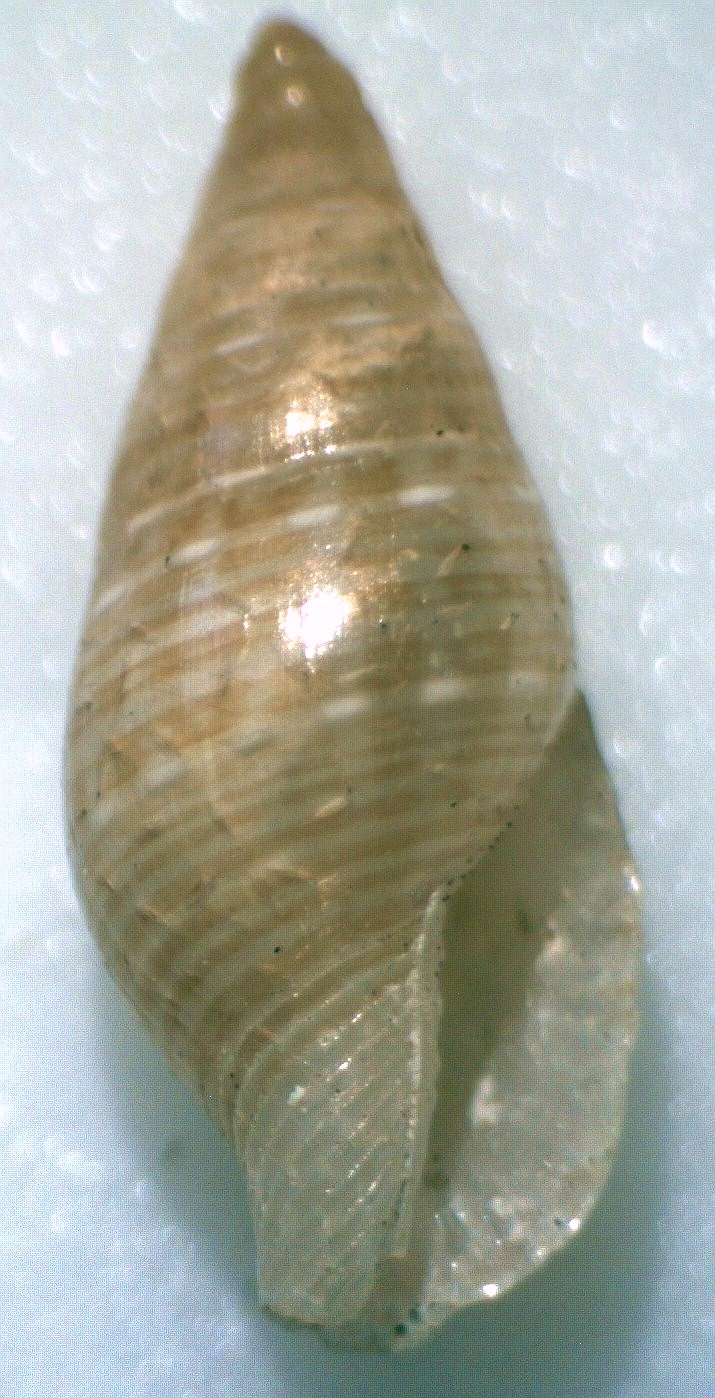
- Apertural view of a shell of Pseudamycla formosa

Scientific classification
- Kingdom: Animalia
- Phylum: Mollusca
- Class: Gastropoda
- Subclass: Caenogastropoda
- Order: Neogastropoda
- Family: Columbellidae
- Genus: Pseudamycla; Pace, 1902

Type species
- Buccinum dermestoideum Lamarck, 1822

= Pseudamycla =

Genus of gastropods

Pseudamycla is a genus of small sea snails, marine gastropod mollusks in the family Columbellidae, the dove snails.

== Species ==
Species within the genus Pseudamycla include:

- Pseudamycla dermestoidea (Lamarck, 1822)
- Pseudamycla formosa (Gaskoin, 1851)
- Pseudamycla miltostoma (Tenison-Woods, 1877)

The Indo-Pacific Molluscan Database (OBIS) also includes the following species with names in current use :

- Pseudamycla rorida (Reeve, 1859 in 1843-65)
