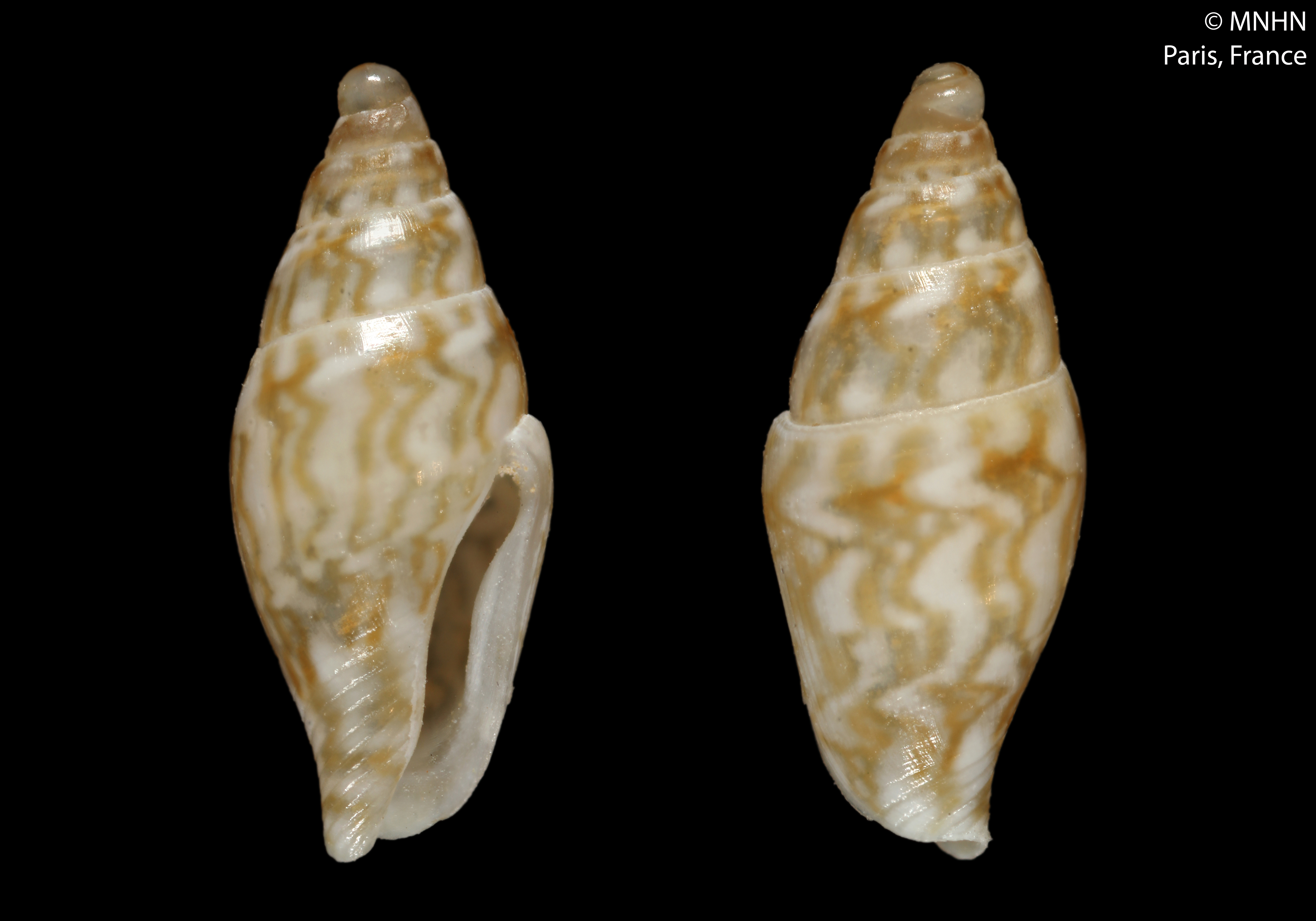
- Shell of Ascalista letourneuxi (holotype at MNHN, Paris)

Scientific classification
- Kingdom: Animalia
- Phylum: Mollusca
- Class: Gastropoda
- Subclass: Caenogastropoda
- Order: Neogastropoda
- Family: Columbellidae
- Genus: Ascalista; Drivas & Jay, 1990

Type species
- Zafra polita G. Nevill & H. Nevill, 1875

= Ascalista =

Genus of gastropods

Ascalista is a small genus of sea snails in the family Columbellidae.

== Species ==
There are two species in the genus Ascalista:

- Ascalista letourneuxi K. Monsecour & D. Monsecour, 2015
- Ascalista polita (G. Nevill & H. Nevill, 1875)
