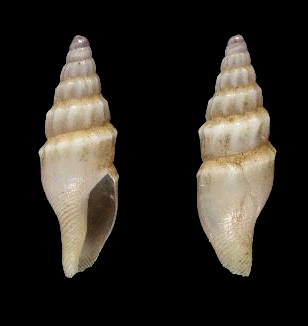
- Shell of Parviterebra turriformis (holotype at MNHN, Paris)

Scientific classification
- Kingdom: Animalia
- Phylum: Mollusca
- Class: Gastropoda
- Subclass: Caenogastropoda
- Order: Neogastropoda
- Family: Columbellidae
- Genus: Parviterebra; Pilsbry, 1904

Type species
- Parviterebra paucivolvis Pilsbry, 1904

= Parviterebra =

Genus of gastropods

Parviterebra is a small genus of sea snails in the family Columbellidae. Species of this genus occur off Réunion and Australia.

== Species ==
There are six species in the genus Parviterebra:

- Parviterebra brazieri (Angas, 1875)
- Parviterebra paucivolvis Pilsbry, 1904
- Parviterebra separanda Tomlin, 1923
- Parviterebra thyraea (Melvill, 1897)
- Parviterebra trilineata (A. Adams & Angas, 1864)
- Parviterebra turriformis Drivas & Jay, 1990
