= Ramoliva =

Scientific classification
- Kingdom: Animalia
- Phylum: Mollusca
- Class: Gastropoda
- Subclass: Caenogastropoda
- Order: Neogastropoda
- Family: Columbellidae
- Genus: Ramoliva
- Species: R. adiorygma

Binomial name
- Ramoliva adiorygma (Verco, 1909)

Monotypic genus of gastropod

Ramoliva is a monotypic genus of sea snail in the family Columbellidae. Its sole accepted species is Ramoliva adiorygma.
