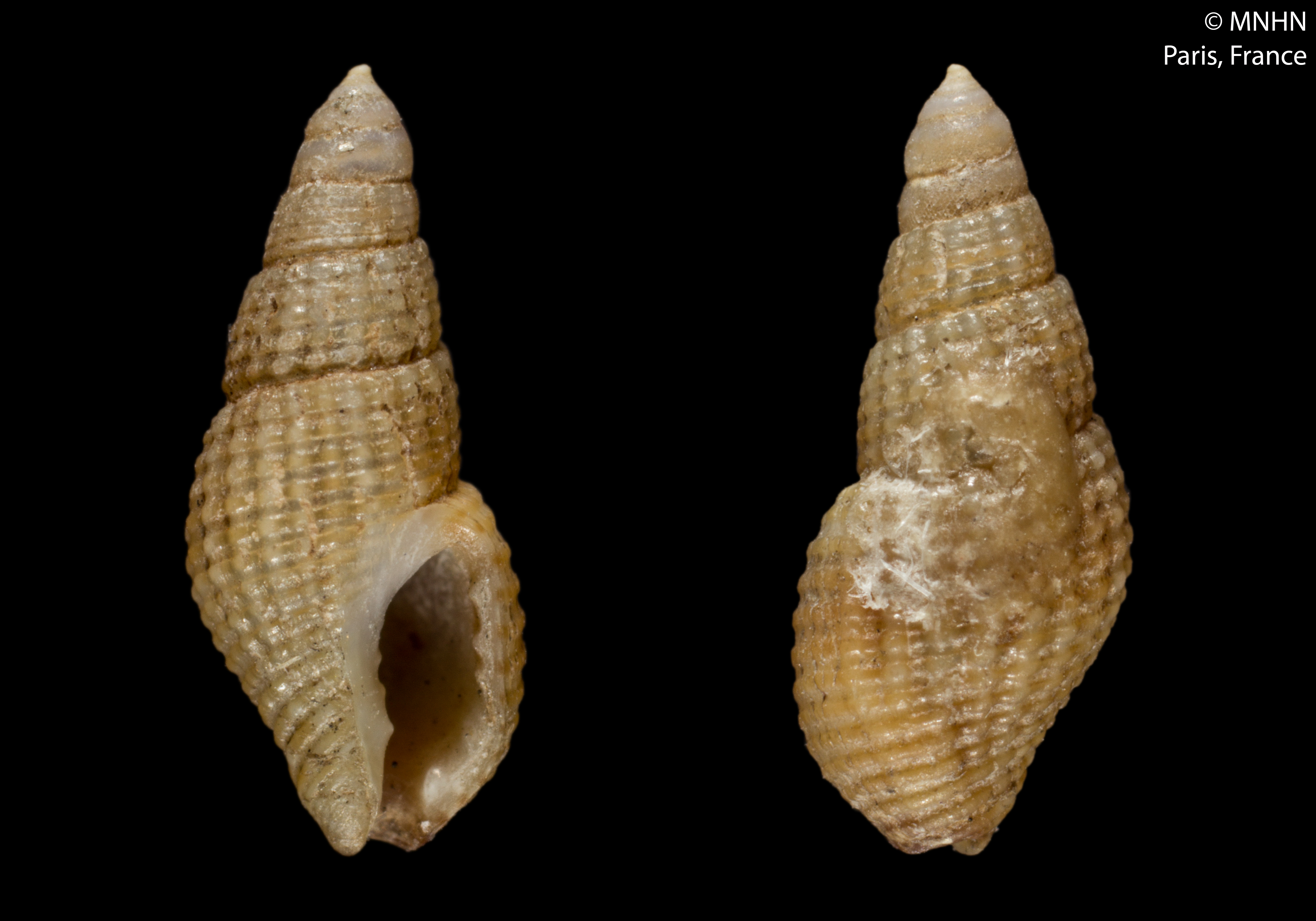
- Shell of Salitra bourguignati (syntype at MNHN, Paris)

Scientific classification
- Kingdom: Animalia
- Phylum: Mollusca
- Class: Gastropoda
- Subclass: Caenogastropoda
- Order: Neogastropoda
- Superfamily: Buccinoidea
- Family: Columbellidae
- Genus: Salitra; Marincovich, 1973

Type species
- Salitra radwini Marincovich, 1973

= Salitra =

Genus of gastropods

Salitra is a genus of sea snails, marine gastropod mollusks in the family Columbellidae; the dove snails.

== Species ==
Species within the genus Salitra include:

- Salitra bourguignati (Locard, 1891)

Synonyms

- Salitra radwini Marincovich, 1973: synonym of Salitra bourguignati (Locard, 1891)
