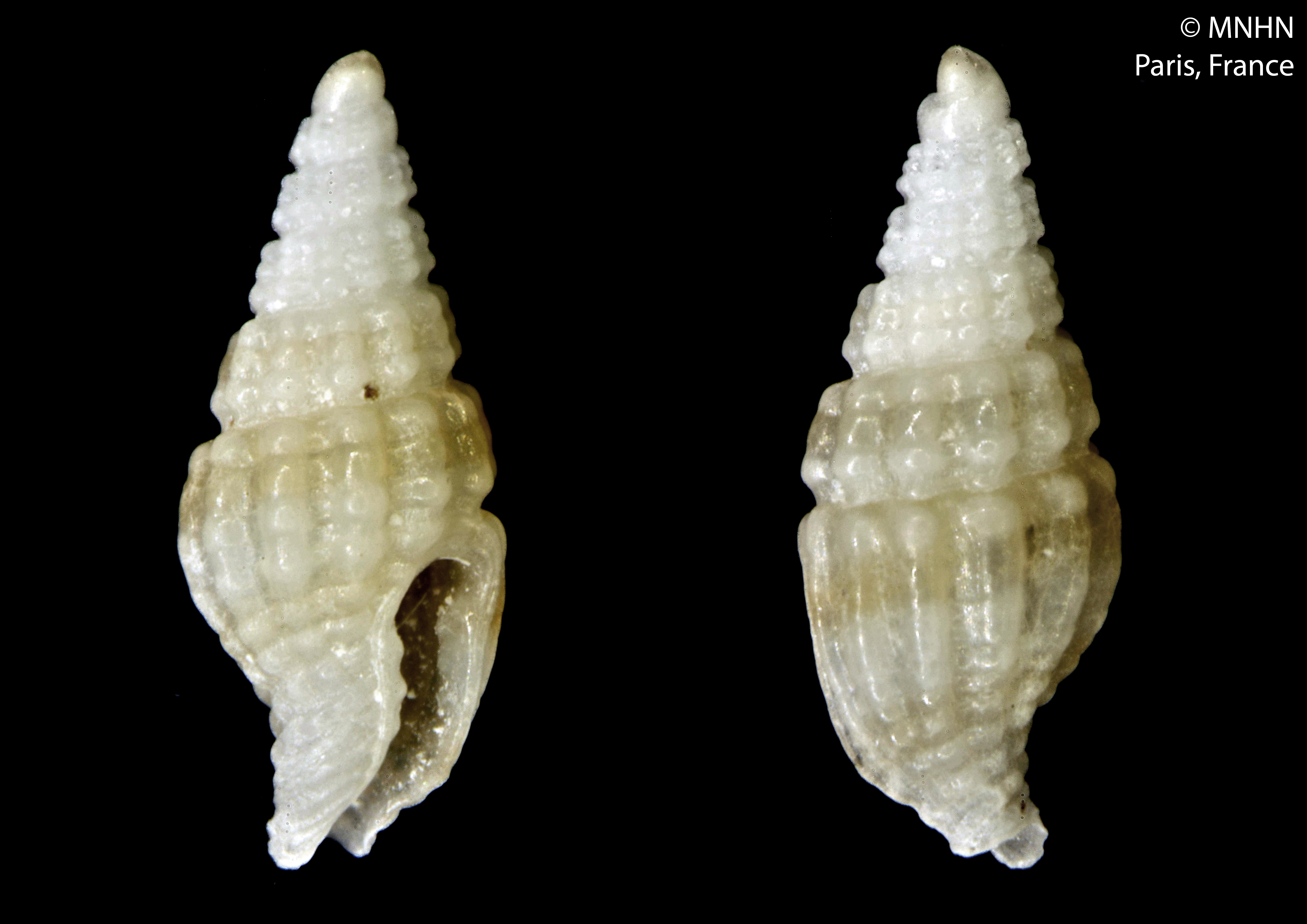
- Shell of Mitropsis paumotensis (specimen at MNHN, Paris)

Scientific classification
- Kingdom: Animalia
- Phylum: Mollusca
- Class: Gastropoda
- Subclass: Caenogastropoda
- Order: Neogastropoda
- Superfamily: Buccinoidea
- Family: Columbellidae
- Genus: Mitropsis; Pease, 1868

Type species
- Mitropsis fusiformis Pease, 1868

Synonyms
- Columbella (Mitropsis) Pease, 1868

= Mitropsis =

Genus of gastropods

Mitropsis is a monotypic genus of sea snails in the family Columbellidae, the dove snails.

== Species ==
- Mitropsis paumotensis (Tryon, 1883)

Synonym

- Mitropsis fusiformis Pease, 1868: synonym of Mitropsis paumotensis (Tryon, 1883) (invalid: treated as a secondary homonym of Columbella fusiformis by Tryon, who established the replacement name Columbella paumotensis)

== Distribution ==
This marine species was found off the Tuamotu archipelago.
