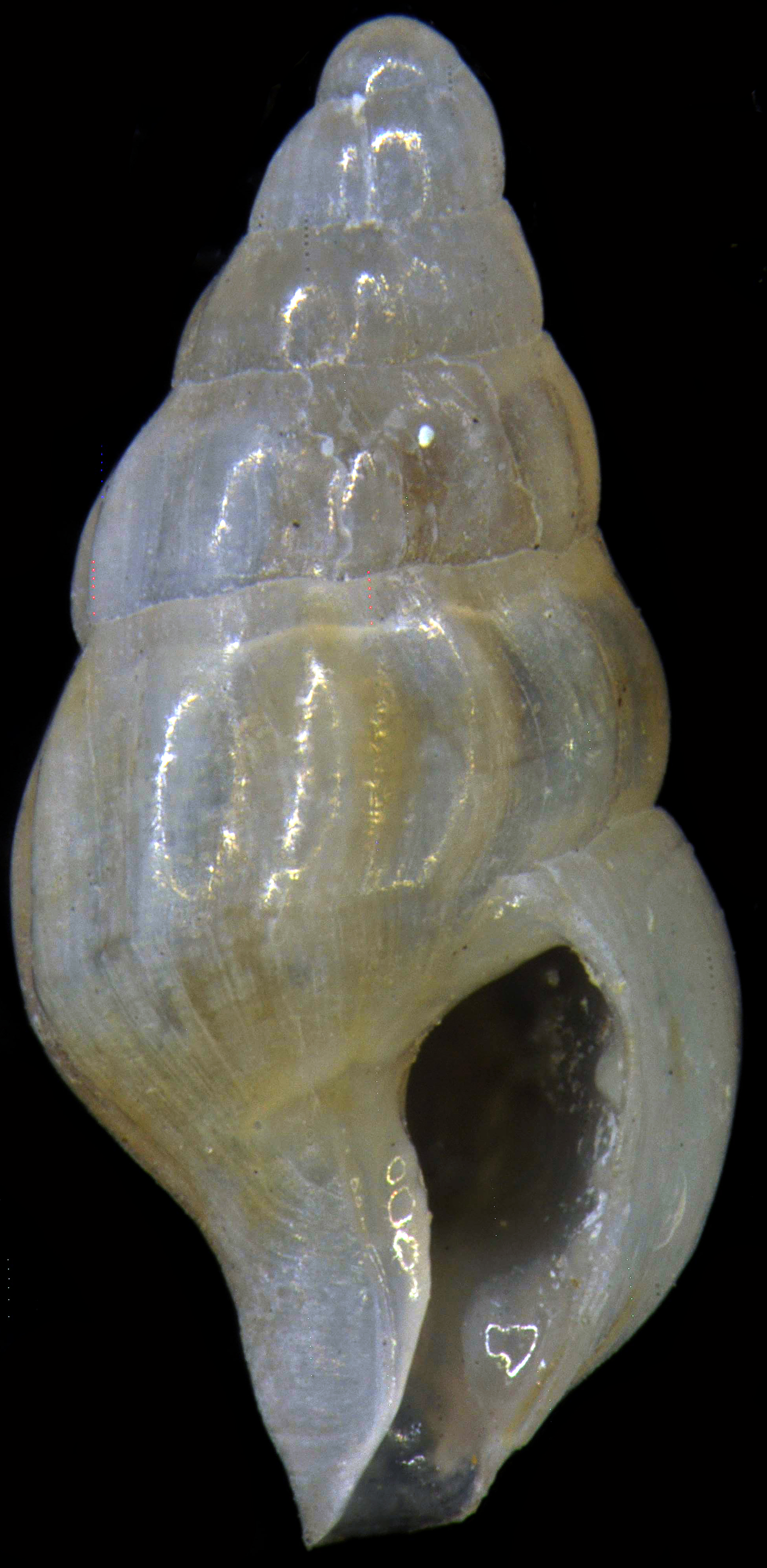
- Shell of Minimanachis exigua (holotype at MNHN, Paris)

Scientific classification
- Kingdom: Animalia
- Phylum: Mollusca
- Class: Gastropoda
- Subclass: Caenogastropoda
- Order: Neogastropoda
- Family: Columbellidae
- Genus: Minimanachis; Pelorce, 2017

Type species
- Anachis karukeraensis Pelorce & Faber, 2013

= Minimanachis =

Genus of gastropods

Minimanachis is a small genus of sea snails in the family Columbellidae, the dove snails.

== Species ==
- Minimanachis exigua Pelorce, 2020
- Minimanachis hartmanni (Espinosa & Ortea, 2014)
- Minimanachis karukeraensis (Pelorce & Faber, 2013)
- Minimanachis pulla Pelorce, 2020
