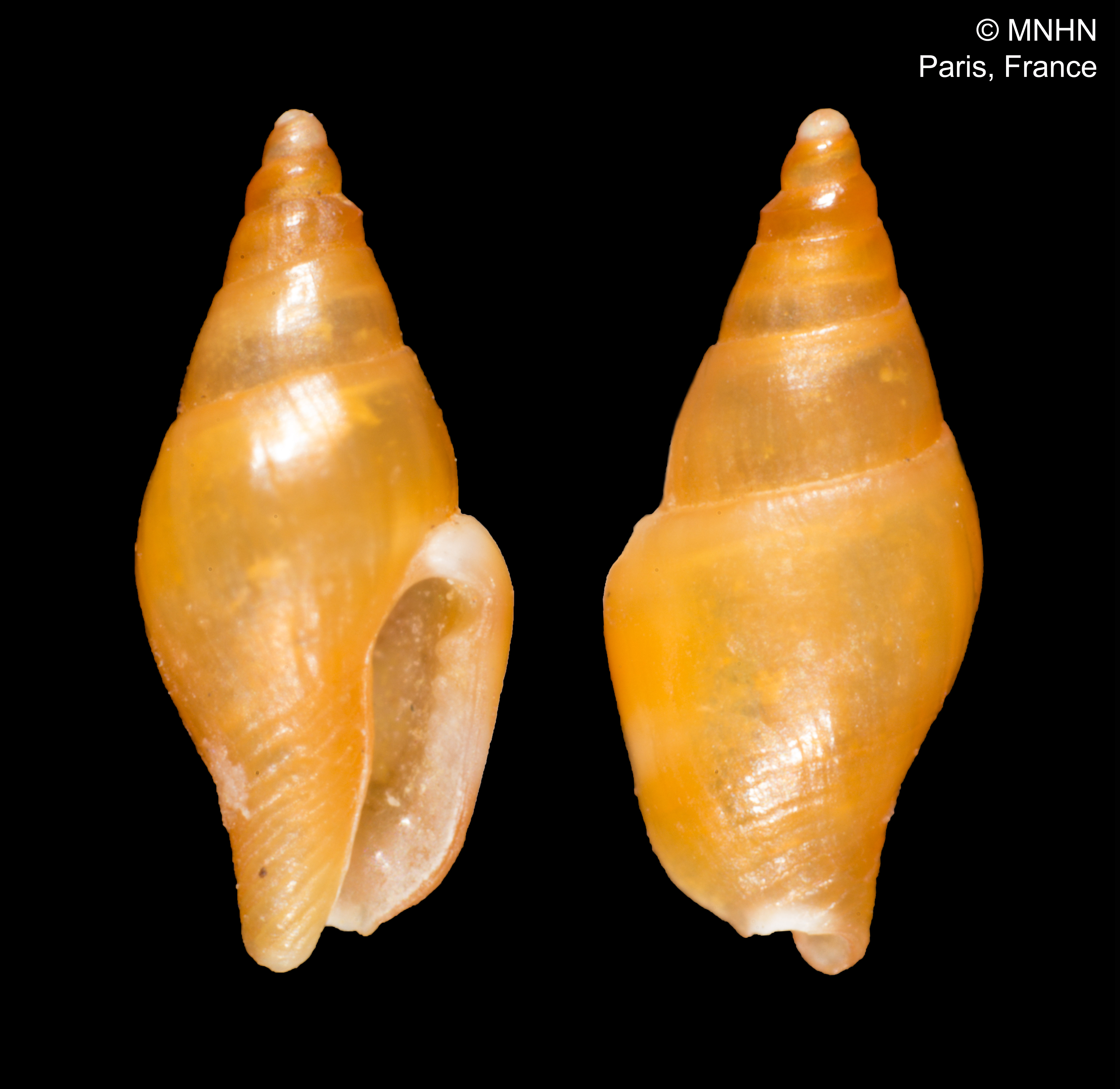
- Shell of Euspiralta santoensis (holotype at MNHN, Paris)

Scientific classification
- Kingdom: Animalia
- Phylum: Mollusca
- Class: Gastropoda
- Subclass: Caenogastropoda
- Order: Neogastropoda
- Superfamily: Buccinoidea
- Family: Columbellidae
- Genus: Euspiralta; K. Monsecour & Pelorce, 2013

Type species
- Euspiralta santoensis K. Monsecour & Pelorce, 2013

= Euspiralta =

Genus of gastropods

Euspiralta is a genus of sea snails, marine gastropod mollusks in the family Columbellidae, the dove snails.

== Species ==
Species within the genus Euspiralta include:

- Euspiralta santoensis K. Monsecour & Pelorce, 2013
