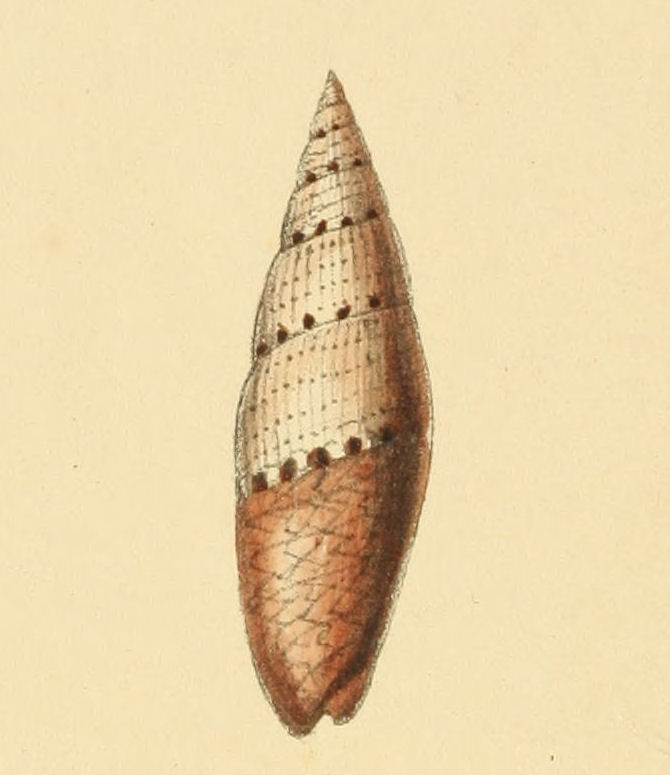

Scientific classification
- Kingdom: Animalia
- Phylum: Mollusca
- Class: Gastropoda
- Subclass: Caenogastropoda
- Order: Neogastropoda
- Family: Columbellidae
- Genus: Mitrella
- Species: M. ocellata

Binomial name
- Mitrella ocellata (Gmelin, 1791)

Synonyms
- Buccinum argus Orbigny, A.V.M.D. d', 1847; Buccinum cribrarium Lamarck, 1822; Columbella argus d'Orbigny, 1847; Columbella philodicia Duclos, 1846; Mitrella argus (d'Orbigny, 1847); Voluta ocellata Gmelin, 1791 (original combination)

= Mitrella ocellata =

Species of mollusc

Mitrella ocellata, the white-spotted dove shell, is a species of sea snail in the family Columbellidae.

== Description ==
The size of the shell varies between 6 mm and 14 mm. The small, oblong shell is moderately thick, cylindrical, and smooth. It is fawn colored or red, dotted with small, round, white dots, disposed regularly in quincunxes, or in a network. The spire is composed of eleven whorls, generally truncated at the summit. The whorls are subconnate, surrounded at their upper part by an articulated band of white and brown. The body whorl is ornamented towards its base with numerous transverse fine striae. The aperture is narrow, of a violet color. The outer lip is obtuse, thick, almost straight, interiorly having small folds or teeth in large quantities. The upper extremity forms the commencement of an emargination. All the external surface of this shell is covered by a membranous, reddish, thin periosteum, so transparent, that the colors are seen through it.

== Distribution ==
This marine species has a wide distribution. It has been found in the Caribbean Sea, the Gulf of Mexico, and the Atlantic Ocean off the coasts of South America, Africa, and remote islands such as Ascension Island and Saint Helena.
