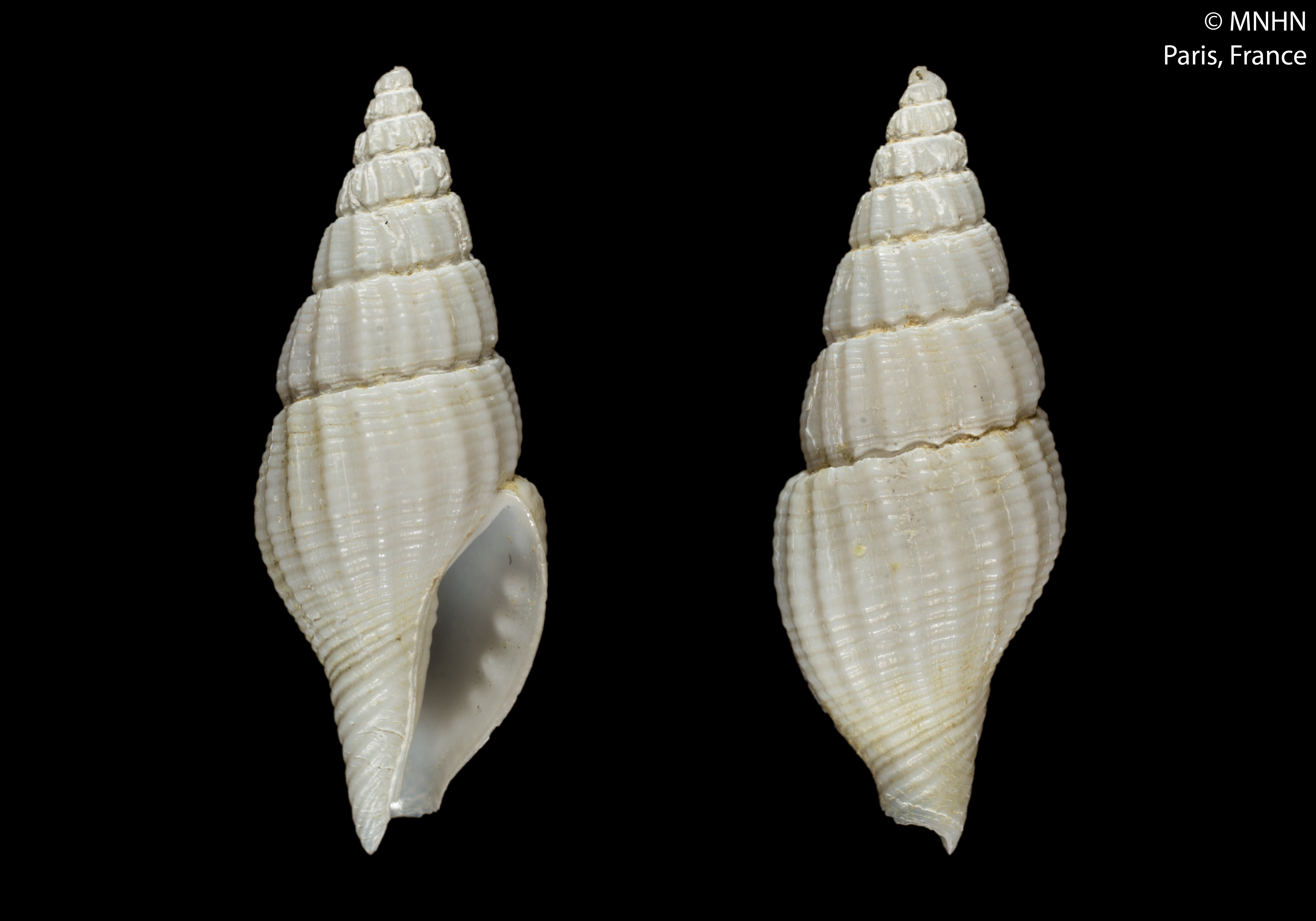
- Shell of Bathyglypta biconica (holotype at MNHN, Paris)

Scientific classification
- Kingdom: Animalia
- Phylum: Mollusca
- Class: Gastropoda
- Subclass: Caenogastropoda
- Order: Neogastropoda
- Family: Columbellidae
- Genus: Bathyglypta; Pelorce, 2017

Type species
- Bathyglypta biconica Pelorce, 2017

= Bathyglypta =

Genus of gastropods

Bathyglypta is a small genus of sea snails in the family Columbellidae, the dove snails.

== Species ==
There are three species within the genus Bathyglypta:

- Bathyglypta biconica Pelorce, 2017
- Bathyglypta erosa Pelorce, 2017
- Bathyglypta procera (Simone & Gracia, 2006)
