= Antizafra =

Scientific classification
- Kingdom: Animalia
- Phylum: Mollusca
- Class: Gastropoda
- Subclass: Caenogastropoda
- Order: Neogastropoda
- Family: Columbellidae
- Genus: †Antizafra; Finlay, 1926

Type species
- † Columbella pisaniopsis F. W. Hutton, 1885

Genus of gastropods

Antizafra is a genus of extinct sea snails, marine gastropod mollusks in the family Columbellidae, the dove snails.

== Species ==
Species within the genus Antizafra include:

- † Antizafra cancellaria (Hutton, 1885)
- † Antizafra obsoleta C. A. Fleming, 1943
- † Antizafra obtusa C. A. Fleming, 1943
- † Antizafra pisanopsis (Hutton, 1885)
- † Antizafra speighti (Marwick, 1924)
- † Antizafra wairarapa L. C. King, 1933

Species brought into synonymy

- Antizafra aoteana Dell, 1956: synonym of Belomitra aoteana (Dell, 1956)
- Antizafra apicibulbus (Tomlin, 1920): synonym of Antimitrella apicibulbus (Tomlin, 1920)
- Antizafra plexa (Hedley, 1902): synonym of Retizafra plexa (Hedley, 1902)
- Antizafra vivens Powell, 1934: synonym of Macrozafra vivens (Powell, 1934)
