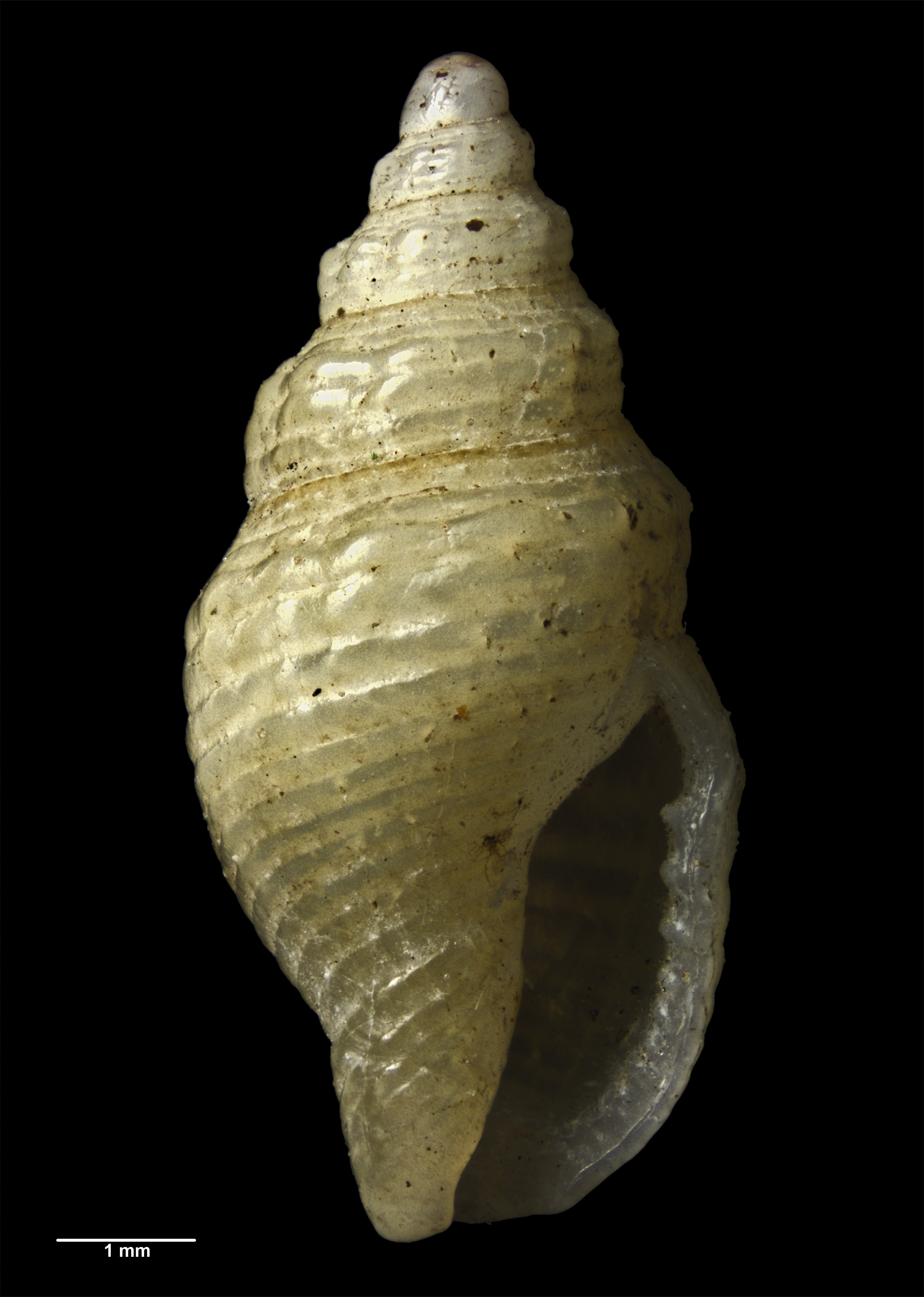
- Macrozafra mariae

Scientific classification
- Kingdom: Animalia
- Phylum: Mollusca
- Class: Gastropoda
- Subclass: Caenogastropoda
- Order: Neogastropoda
- Superfamily: Buccinoidea
- Family: Columbellidae
- Genus: Macrozafra; Finlay, 1926

Type species
- Clathurella subabnormis Suter, 1899

= Macrozafra =

Genus of sea snails

Macrozafra is a genus of dove snails.

== Species ==
- Macrozafra cophinodes (Suter, 1908)
- Macrozafra enwrighti Powell, 1940
- Macrozafra mariae Powell, 1940
- Macrozafra nodicincta (Suter, 1899)
- Macrozafra subabnormis(Suter, 1899)
- Macrozafra vivens (Powell, 1934)
