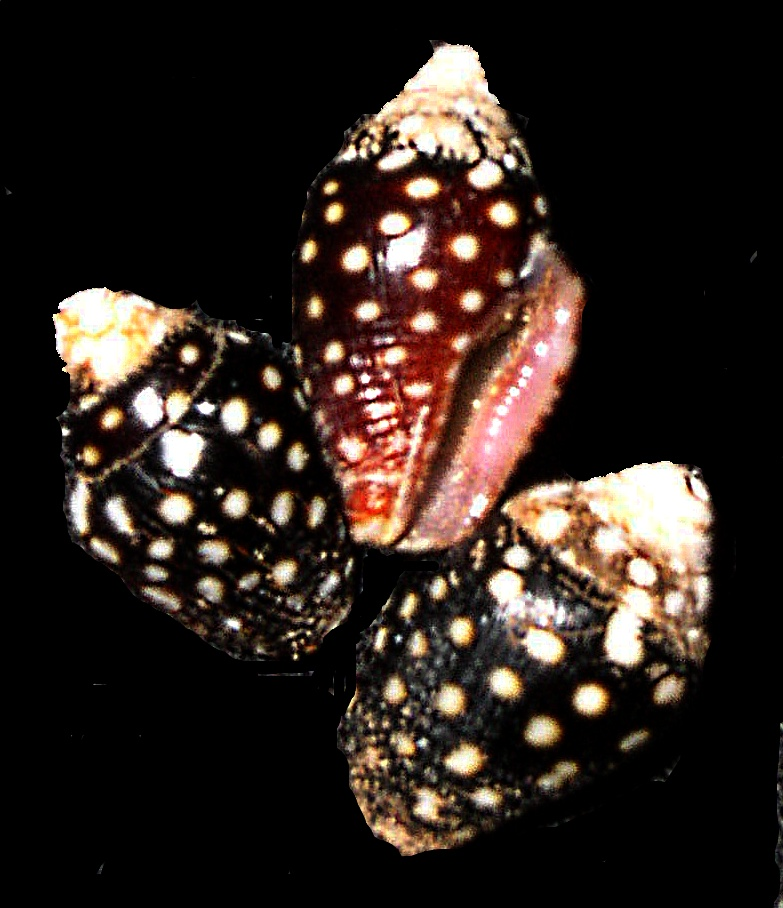
- Pictocolumbella ocellata shells

Scientific classification
- Kingdom: Animalia
- Phylum: Mollusca
- Class: Gastropoda
- Subclass: Caenogastropoda
- Order: Neogastropoda
- Family: Columbellidae
- Genus: Pictocolumbella; Habe, 1945

Type species
- Columbella fulgurans Lamarck, 1822

= Pictocolumbella =

Genus of gastropods

Pictocolumbella is a genus of sea snails, marine gastropod mollusks in the family Columbellidae, the dove snails.

== Species ==
Species within the genus Pictocolumbella include:

- Pictocolumbella ocellata (Link, 1807)
