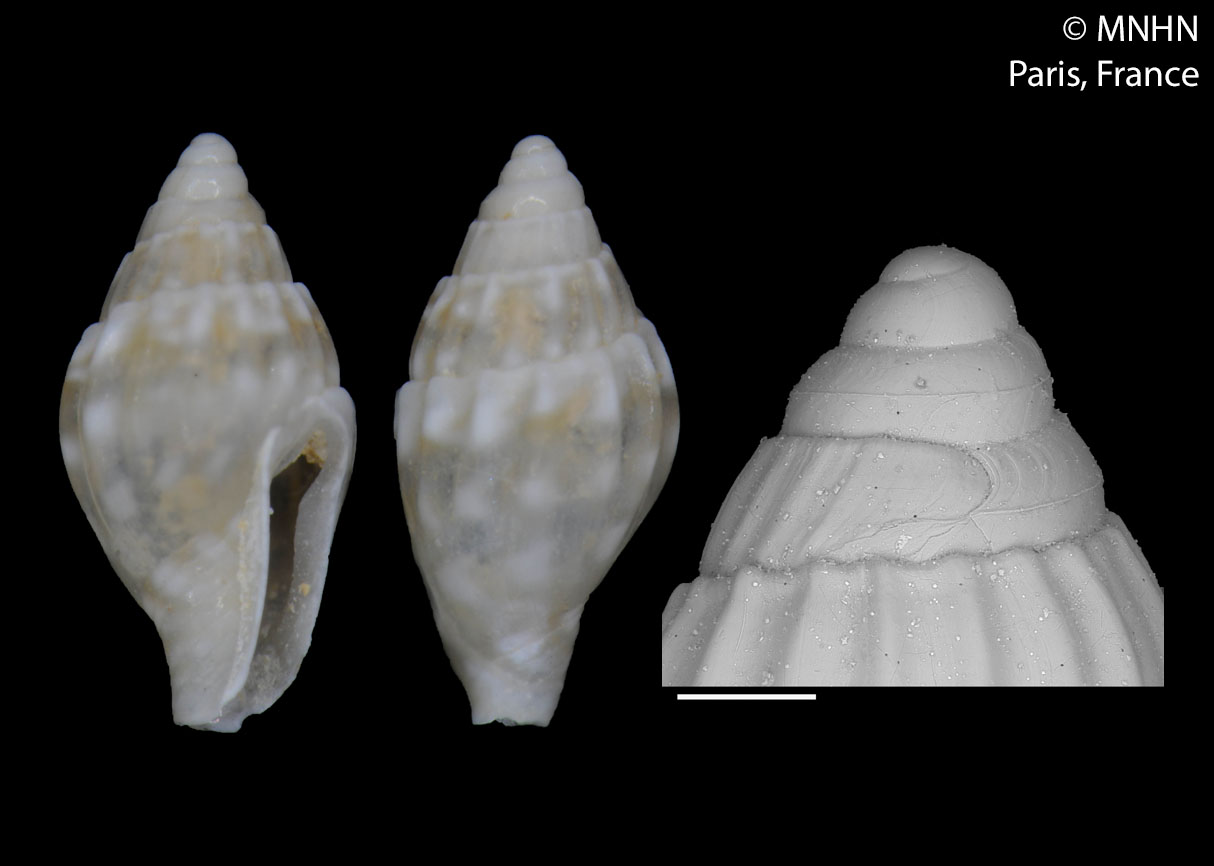
- Shell of Seminella comistea (specimen at MNHN, Paris)

Scientific classification
- Kingdom: Animalia
- Phylum: Mollusca
- Class: Gastropoda
- Subclass: Caenogastropoda
- Order: Neogastropoda
- Superfamily: Buccinoidea
- Family: Columbellidae
- Genus: Seminella; Mörch, 1852

Type species
- Cythara varia Pease, 1860

Synonyms
- Columbella (Seminella) Pease, 1868

= Seminella =

Genus of gastropods

Seminella is a genus of sea snails, marine gastropod mollusks in the family Columbellidae, the dove snails.

== Description ==
The shells in this genus are small. They contain axial ribs and a fine spiral sculpture. The denticles are inside the outer lip.

== Species ==
Species within the genus Seminella include:

- Seminella biconica K. Monsecour & D. Monsecour, 2016
- Seminella comistea (Melvill, 1906)
- Seminella corrugata K. Monsecour & D. Monsecour, 2016
- Seminella infirmisculpta K. Monsecour & D. Monsecour, 2018
- Seminella makemoensis K. Monsecour & D. Monsecour, 2015
- Seminella peasei (Martens & Langkavel, 1871)
- Seminella roseotincta (Hervier, 1899)
- Seminella virginea (Gould, 1860)
