= Antimitrella =

Scientific classification
- Kingdom: Animalia
- Phylum: Mollusca
- Class: Gastropoda
- Subclass: Caenogastropoda
- Order: Neogastropoda
- Family: Columbellidae
- Genus: Antimitrella; Powell, 1937

Type species
- Antimitrella laxa Powell, 1937

Genus of gastropods

Antimitrella is a genus of sea snails, marine gastropod mollusks in the family Columbellidae, the dove snails.

== Species ==
Species within the genus Antimitrella include:

- Antimitrella adela (Thiele, 1925)
- Antimitrella amphitrite (Turton, 1932)
- Antimitrella apicibulbus (Tomlin, 1920)
- Antimitrella fuscafasciata (Lussi, 2009)
- Antimitrella jaci (Lussi, 2009)
- Antimitrella kincaidi (Tomlin, 1926)
- Antimitrella lamellosa (Lussi, 2009)
- Antimitrella laxa (Powell, 1937)
- Antimitrella nereia (Turton, 1932)
- Antimitrella perexilis (Turton, 1932)
