= Cape Maria van Diemen =

Westernmost point of the North Island of New Zealand

Coordinates: 34.476°S 172.645°E

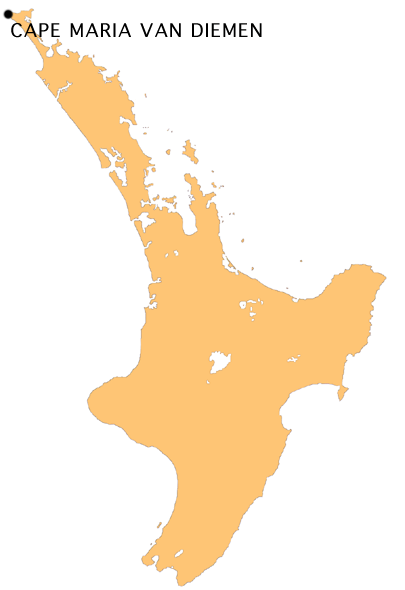
Location of Cape Maria van Diemen

Cape Maria van Diemen is the westernmost point of the North Island of New Zealand. A tombolo, it was originally an island composed mainly of basaltic-andesitic lava flows and dykes. Drifting sands joined it to the rest of the North Island during the late Pleistocene.

The cape was named by Abel Tasman (first European explorer to discover New Zealand) after the wife of his patron, Anthony van Diemen, Governor General of Batavia (now Jakarta) in January 1643, on the same voyage of discovery during which he named Van Diemen's Land (now Tasmania). It is — along with the Three Kings Islands — one of only two geographic features in New Zealand to retain the names given to them by Tasman.

== Climate ==
Cape Maria van Diemen normally has a subtropical climate, but it is the most northerly part of New Zealand in which snowfall has been reported.
