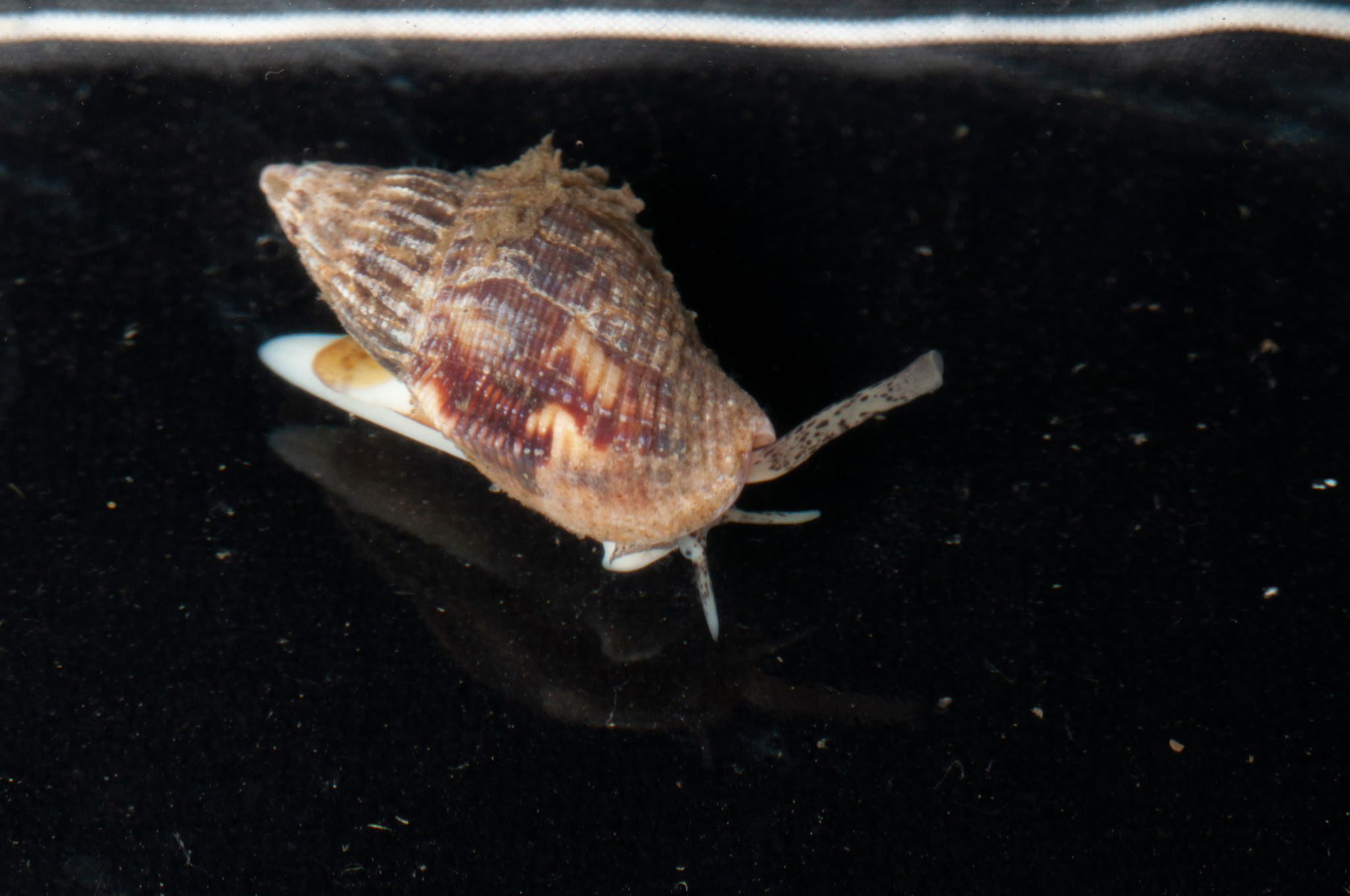
- Live individual of the columbellid species Amphissa columbiana

Scientific classification
- Kingdom: Animalia
- Phylum: Mollusca
- Class: Gastropoda
- Subclass: Caenogastropoda
- Order: Neogastropoda
- Superfamily: Buccinoidea
- Family: Columbellidae; Swainson, 1840

Genera
- See text

Synonyms
- Anachidae Golikov & Starobogatov, 1972; Pyrenidae Suter, 1909

= Columbellidae =

Family of gastropods

The Columbellidae, the dove snails or dove shells, are a family of small sea snails, marine gastropod mollusks in the order Neogastropoda.

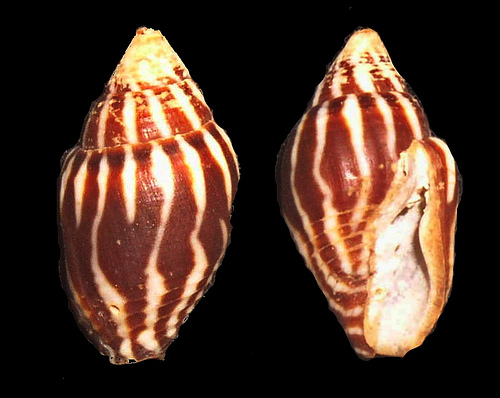
Pardalinops testudinarius

These snails are characterized by their elongated, spiral shells and their carnivorous feeding habits. The family Columbellidae comprises numerous genera and species, many of which share similar shell morphologies and ecological niches.

== Distribution ==
Species in this family are found worldwide, but are most abundant in shallow tropical water.

== Subfamilies ==
According to the taxonomy of the Gastropoda by Bouchet & Rocroi (2005), the family Columbellidae consists of two subfamilies:

- Atiliinae Cossmann, 1901 - synonyms: Pyrenidae Suter, 1909; Anachidae Golikov & Starobogatov, 1972
- Columbellinae Swainson, 1840
- Columbellidae incertae sedis (temporary name)
  - Columbellidae incertae sedis mariato (Pilsbry & H. N. Lowe, 1932)

== Genera ==
The family Columbellidae contains these genera:

subfamily Atiliinae
subfamily Columbellinae

- † Ademitrella Ludbrook, 1941
- Aesopus Gould, 1860
- Alcira H. Adams, 1861
- Alia H. Adams & A. Adams, 1853
- Amphissa H. Adams & A. Adams, 1853
- Anachis H. Adams & A. Adams, 1853
- Antimitrella Powell, 1937
- † Antizafra H. J. Finlay, 1926
- Aoteatilia Powell, 1939
- Ascalista Drivas & Jay, 1990
- Astyris H. Adams and A. Adams, 1853
- † Auingeria Harzhauser & Landau, 2021
- Bathyglypta Pelorce, 2017
- † Bellacolumbella Harzhauser & Landau, 2021
- Bifurcium P. Fischer, 1884
- † Cigclirina Woodring, 1928
- Cilara Thiele, 1924
- Clathranachis Kuroda & Habe, 1954
- Clavistrombina Jung, 1989
- † Clinurella Sacco, 1890
- Columbella Lamarck, 1799 - type genus
- † Columbellisipho Cossmann, 1889
- Conella Swainson, 1840
- Cosmioconcha Dall, 1913
- Costoanachis Sacco, 1890
- Cotonopsis Olsson, 1942
- Decipifus Olsson and McGinty, 1958
- † Defensina Harzhauser & Landau, 2021
- Euplica Dall, 1889
- Eurypyrene Woodring, 1928
- Euspiralta K. Monsecour & Pelorce, 2013
- Exaesopus de Maintenon, 2019
- Exomilopsis Powell, 1964
- Falsuszafrona Pelorce, 2020
- Gatliffena Iredale, 1929
- Glyptanachis Pilsbry & Lowe, 1932
- Graphicomassa Iredale, 1929
- Indomitrella Oostingh, 1940
- Ithiaesopus Olsson & Harbison, 1953
- † Juliamitrella L. D. Campbell, 1993
- Liratilia Finlay, 1927
- Macrozafra Finlay, 1927
- Maintenonia K. Monsecour & D. Monsecour, 2024
- † Martaia Harzhauser & Landau, 2021
- Mazatlania Dall, 1913
- Metanachis Thiele, 1924
- Metulella Gabb, 1873
- Microcithara P. Fischer, 1884
- Minimanachis Pelorce, 2020
- Mitrella Risso, 1826
- Mitropsis Pease, 1868
- Mokumea Habe, 1991
- Nassarina Dall, 1889
- Nitidella Swainson, 1840
- Nodochila Rehder, 1980
- † Orthurella Sacco, 1890
- Parametaria Dall, 1916
- Pardalinops De Maintenon, 2008
- Parvanachis Radwin, 1968
- Parviterebra Pilsbry, 1904
- Paxula Finlay, 1927
- Pictocolumbella Habe, 1945
- Pleurifera Drivas & Jay, 1997
- Pseudamycla Pace, 1902
- Pyrene Röding, 1798
- Pyreneola Iredale, 1918
- Radwinia Shasky, 1970
- Ramoliva Cotton & Godfrey, 1932
- Redfernella Espinosa & Ortea, 2020
- Retizafra Hedley, 1913
- Rhombinella Radwin, 1968
- Ruthia Shasky, 1970
- Salitra Marincovich, 1973
- † Scabrella Sacco, 1890
- Seminella Pease, 1867
- Sincola Olsson & Harbison, 1953
- Smithena Boyer, Pelorce & Gori, 2022
- Speirazafra K. Monsecour & Raines, 2024
- Steironepion Pilsbry and Lowe, 1932
- Strombina Mörch, 1852
- † Strombinella Dall, 1896
- Sulcomitrella Kuroda, Habe & Oyama, 1971
- Suturoglypta Radwin, 1968
- † Thiarella Sacco, 1890
- † Trahaldia Pacaud, 2017
- † Turricolumbus Cossmann, 1901
- Turrijaumelia Sarasúa, 1975
- Urpiella Arias Ávila, 2021
- Zafra A. Adams, 1860
- Zafrona Iredale, 1916
- Zanassarina Pilsbry & H. N. Lowe, 1932
- Zella Iredale, 1924
- Zemitrella Finlay, 1927
- Zetekia Dall, 1918

== Synonyms ==
- Atilia H. Adams & A. Adams, 1853 - type genus of the subfamily Atiliinae: synonym of Anachis H. Adams & A. Adams, 1853
- Columbellopsis Bucquoy, Dautzenberg and Dollfus, 1882: synonym of Mitrella Risso, 1826
- Minipyrene Coomans, 1967: synonym of Mitromorpha P. P. Carpenter, 1865

== Gallery ==
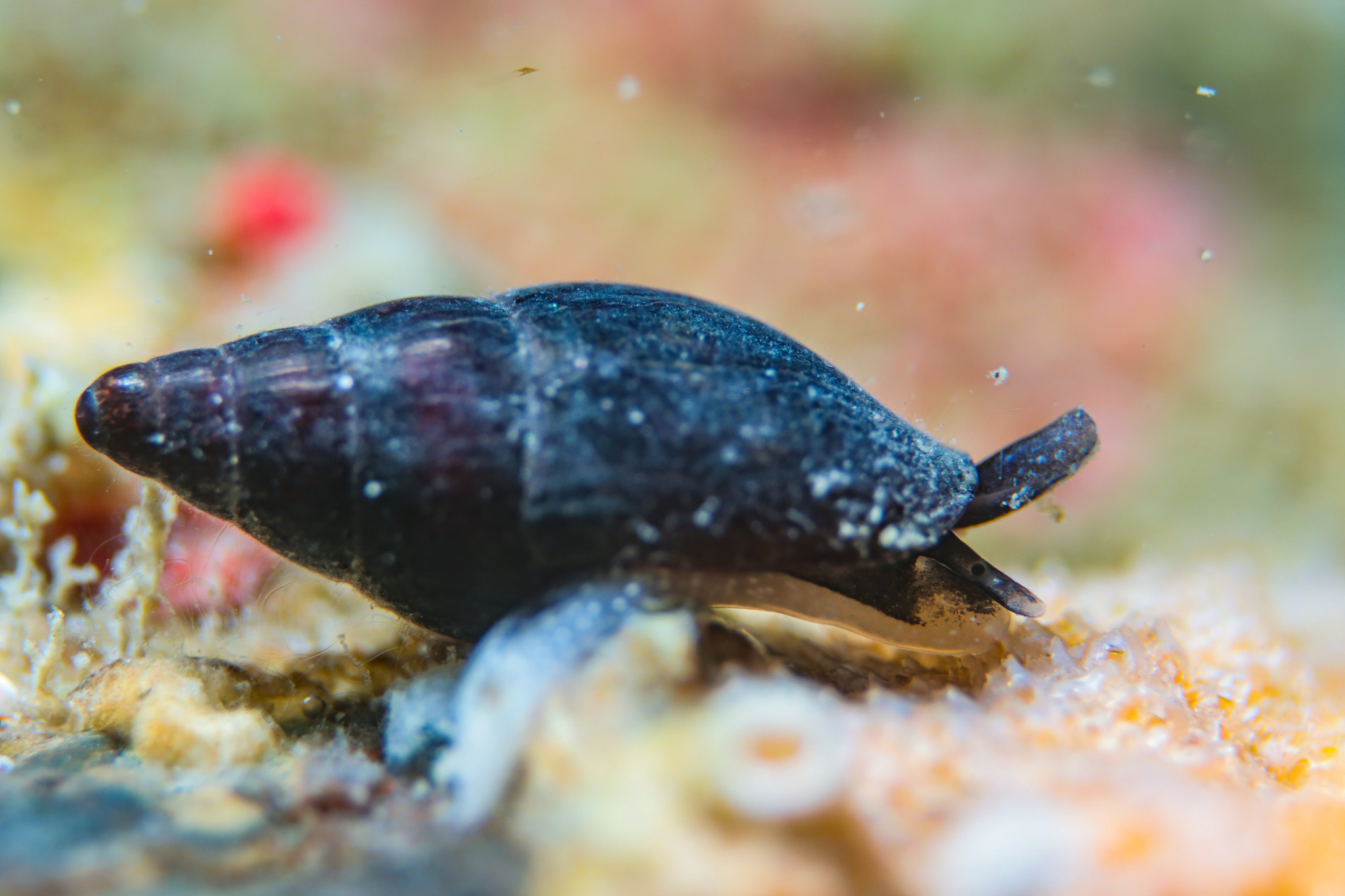
Live Zemitrella choava

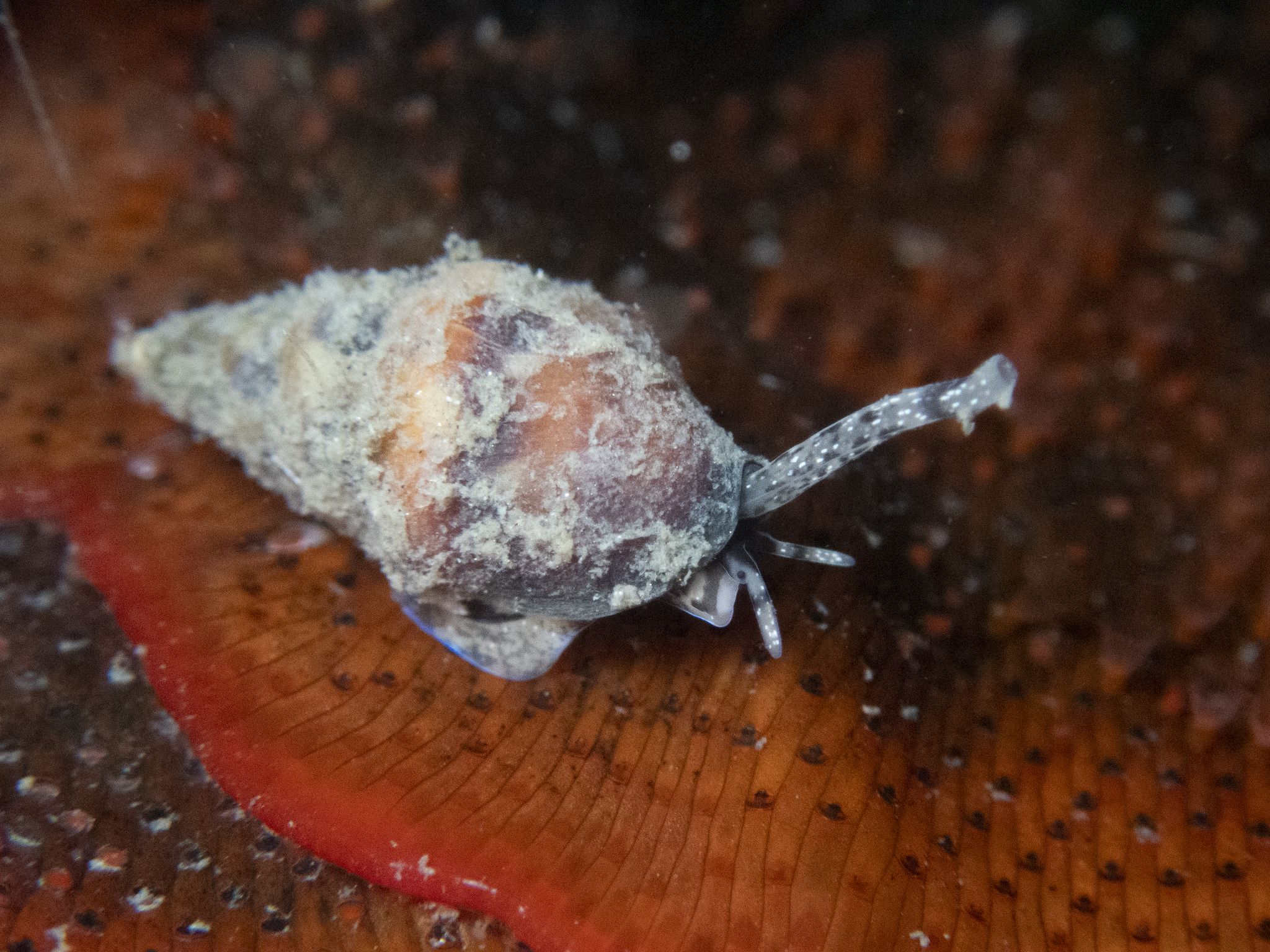
Live Alia carinata

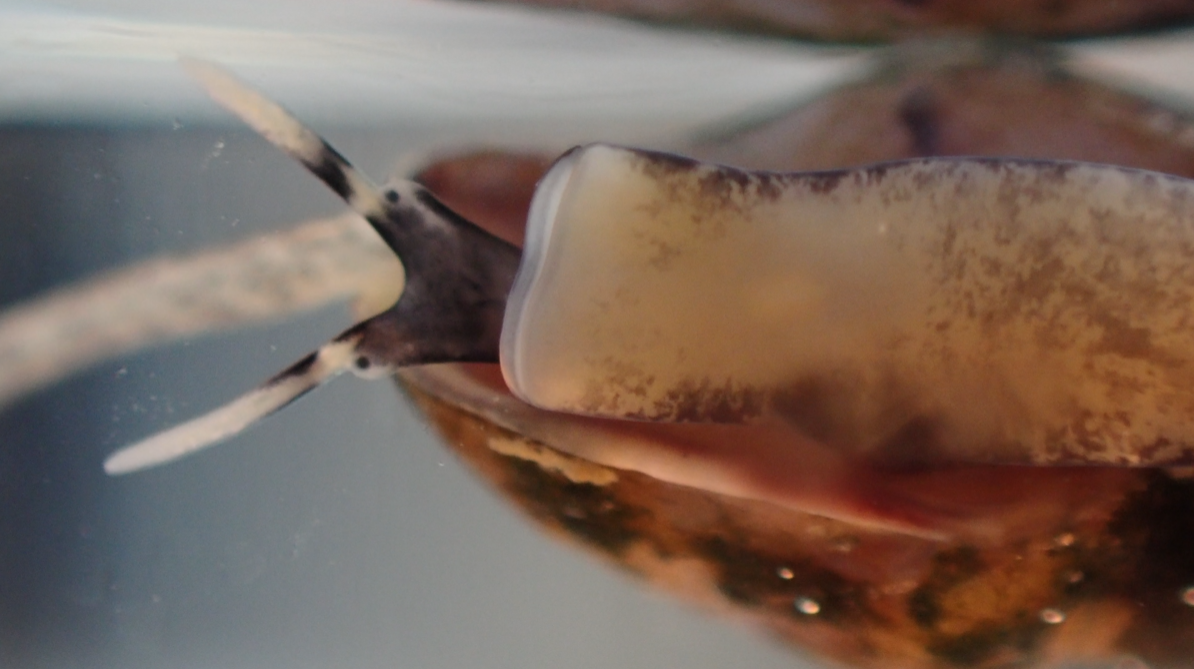
Foot of live A. carinata

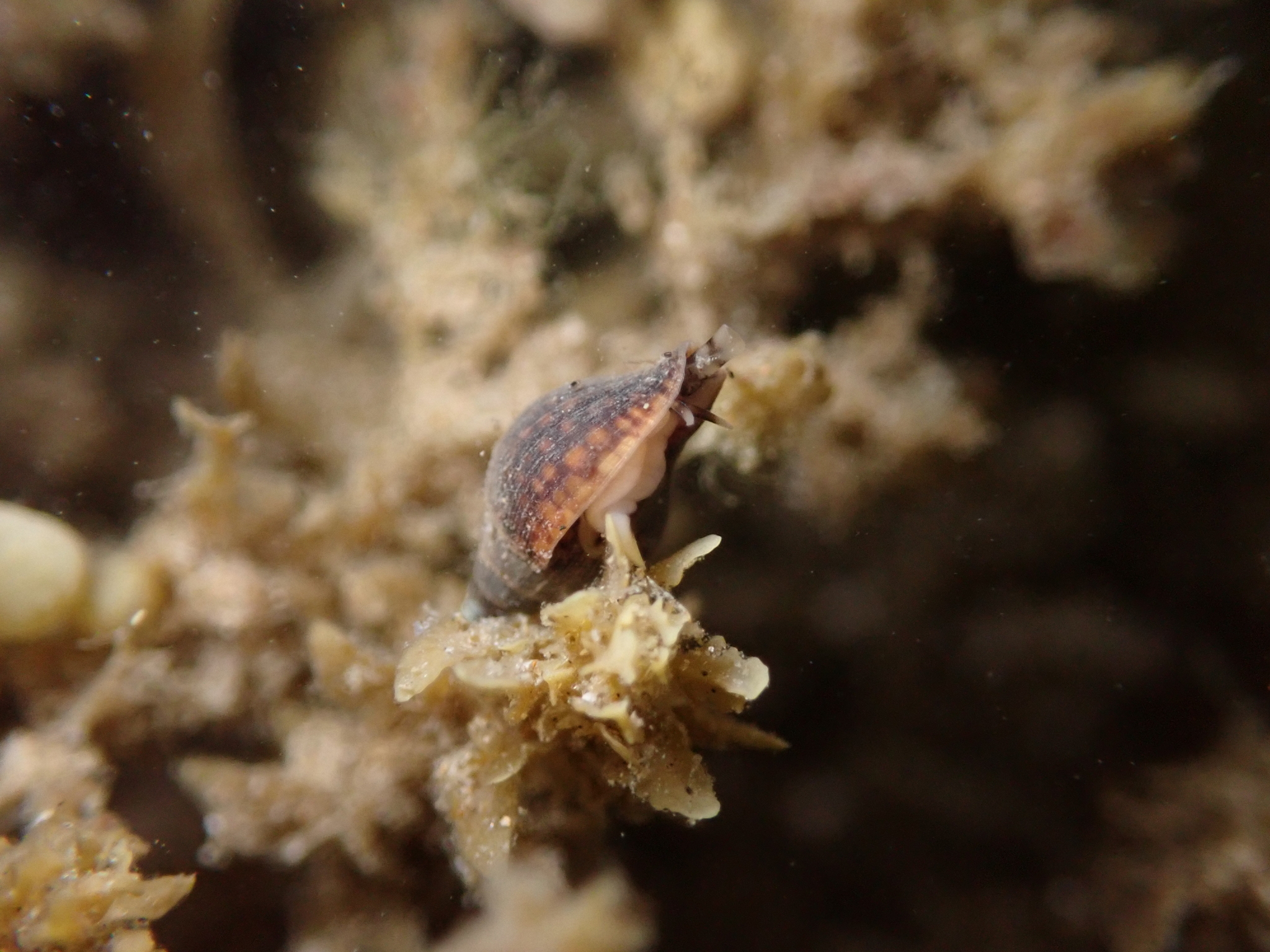
Live Pardalinops testudinarius

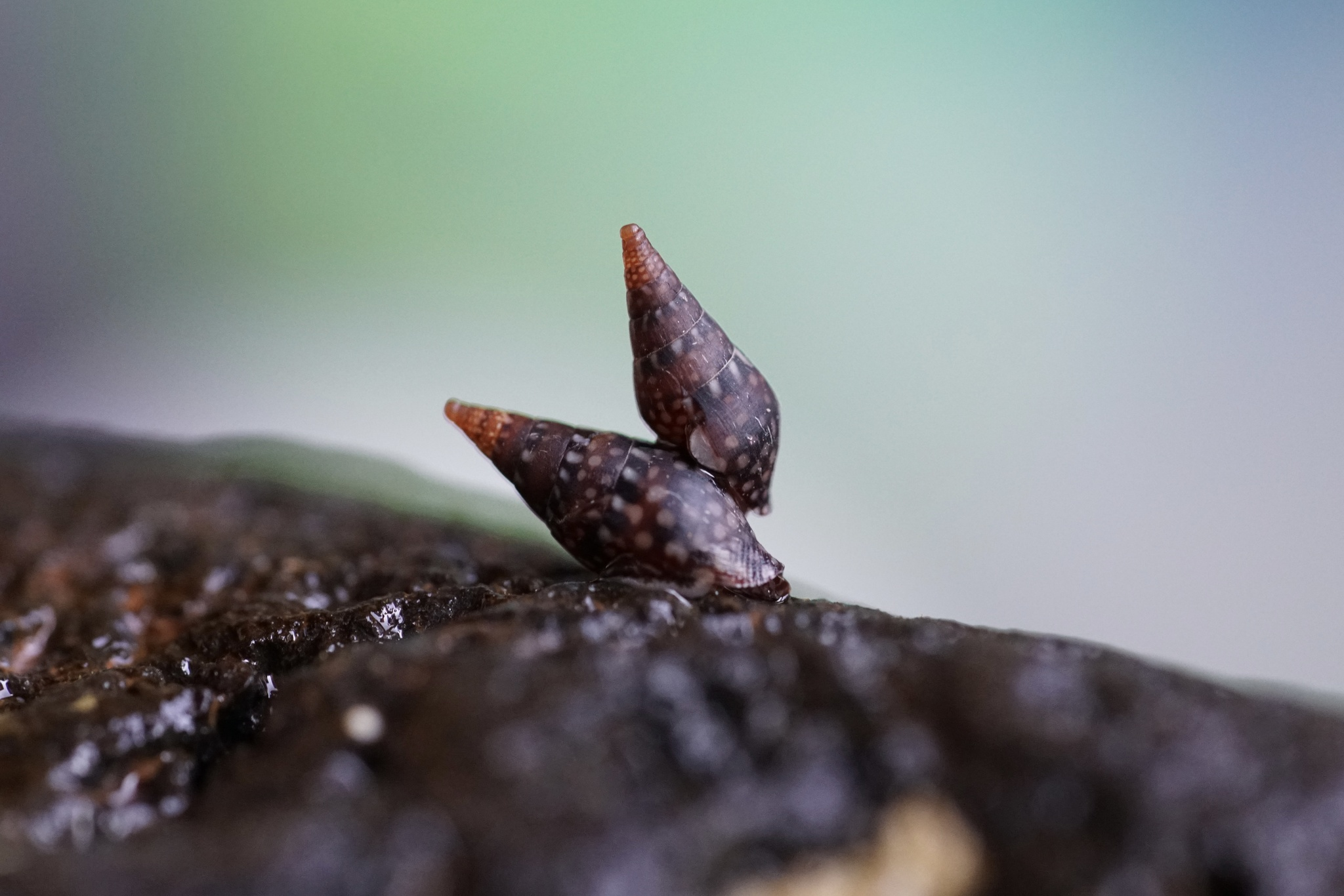
Two live Mitrella ocellata
