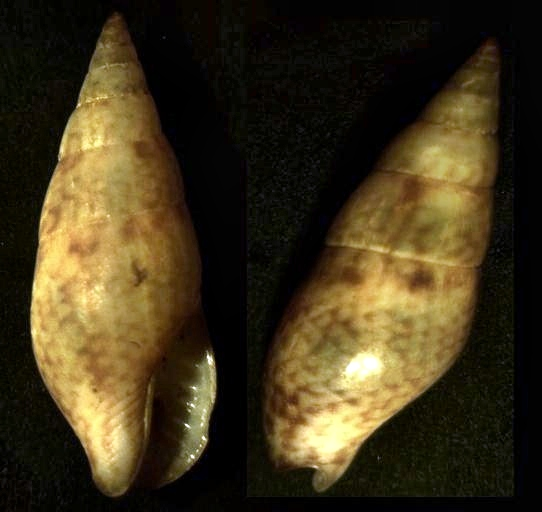
- Two views of a shell of Costoanachis sertularium

Scientific classification
- Kingdom: Animalia
- Phylum: Mollusca
- Class: Gastropoda
- Subclass: Caenogastropoda
- Order: Neogastropoda
- Superfamily: Buccinoidea
- Family: Columbellidae
- Genus: Costoanachis; Sacco, 1890

Type species
- † Columbella turrita Sacco, 1890

Synonyms
- Anachis (Costoanachis) Sacco, 1890; Columbella (Costoanachis) Sacco, 1890 (original rank)

= Costoanachis =

Genus of gastropods

Costoanachis is a genus of sea snails, marine gastropod mollusks in the family Columbellidae, the dove snails.

== Species ==
Species within the genus Costoanachis include:

- Costoanachis albicostata K. Monsecour & D. Monsecour, 2016
- Costoanachis alcazari Ortea & Espinosa, 2017
- Costoanachis aurea Lussi, 2017
- Costoanachis avara (Say, 1822)
- Costoanachis beckeri (G.B. Sowerby III, 1900)
- Costoanachis calidoscopio Espinosa, Ortea & Diez, 2017
- Costoanachis carioca K. Monsecour & D. Monsecour, 2024
- Costoanachis carmelita Espinosa, Ortea & Fernadez-Garcés, 2007
- Costoanachis cascabulloi Espinosa, Fernandez-Garcès & Ortea, 2004
- Costoanachis castoi Ortea & Espinoza, 2018
- Costoanachis catenata (G. B. Sowerby I, 1844)
- † Costoanachis chinensis (MacNeil, 1961)
- Costoanachis delahozi Ortea & Espinoza, 2018
- Costoanachis floridana (Rehder, 1939)
- Costoanachis geovanysi Espinosa & Ortea, 2014
- Costoanachis guembeli (R. Hoernes & Auinger, 1880) †
- † Costoanachis haitensis (G. B. Sowerby I, 1850)
- † Costoanachis harzhauseri Landau, Van Dingenen & Ceulemans, 2023
- Costoanachis hotessieriana (d’Orbigny, 1842)
- † Costoanachis idjowensis (Oostingh, 1940)
- Costoanachis indistincta (Thiele, 1925)
- Costoanachis jeffreysbayensis Lussi, 2017
- Costoanachis kirostra (Duclos, 1840)
- † Costoanachis koolhoveni (Oostingh, 1940)
- † Costoanachis latecostata (O. Boettger, 1902)
- † Costoanachis lauensis (Ladd, 1977)
- † Costoanachis leroyi (MacNeil, 1961)
- † Costoanachis magnicostata Sacco, 1890
- † Costoanachis parva Sacco, 1890
- † Costoanachis peyrehoradensis Lozouet, 2015
- † Costoanachis praeterebralis Lozouet, 2015
- † Costoanachis problematica (Laws, 1944)
- † Costoanachis procorrugata Sacco, 1890
- † Costoanachis rewaensis (Ladd, 1977)
- Costoanachis rudyi Espinosa & Ortea, 2006
- † Costoanachis saccostata Radwin, 1968
- Costoanachis scutulata (Reeve, 1859)
- † Costoanachis semicostata Sacco, 1890
- Costoanachis semiplicata (Stearns, 1873)
- Costoanachis sertulariarum (d'Orbigny, 1839)
- Costoanachis similis (Ravenel, 1861)
- Costoanachis sparsa (Reeve, 1859)
- Costoanachis stimpsoni (Bartsch, 1915)
- Costoanachis teophania (Duclos, 1848)
- † Costoanachis terebralis (Grateloup, 1834)
- Costoanachis translirata (Ravenel, 1861)
- † Costoanachis turbinellus Sacco, 1890
- † Costoanachis venzoi Harzhauser & Landau, 2021
- Costoanachis waltershoalensis K. Monsecour & D. Monsecour, 2024
- † Costoanachis winradi (Ladd, 1977)

Species brought into synonymy

- Costoanachis bacalladoi Espinosa, Ortea & Moro, 2008: synonym of Anachis bacalladoi Espinosa, Ortea & Moro, 2008
- Costoanachis dentilabia Lussi, 2009: synonym of Retizafra dentilabia (Lussi, 2009)
- Costoanachis fenneli Radwin, 1968: synonym of Anachis fenneli Radwin, 1968
- Costoanachis fluctuata (G. B. Sowerby I, 1832): synonym of Anachis fluctuata (G. B. Sowerby I, 1832)
- Costoanachis lafresnayi (P. Fischer & Bernardi, 1857): synonym of Cotonopsis lafresnayi (P. Fischer & Bernardi, 1857)
- Costoanachis rassierensis Smythe, 1985: synonym of Anachis rassierensis Smythe, 1985
- Costoanachis rugosa (G. B. Sowerby I, 1832): synonym of Anachis rugosa (G. B. Sowerby I, 1832)
- Costoanachis valae Lussi, 2009: synonym of Retizafra valae (Lussi, 2009)
- Costoanachis varia (G. B. Sowerby I, 1832: synonym of Anachis varia (G. B. Sowerby I, 1832)
