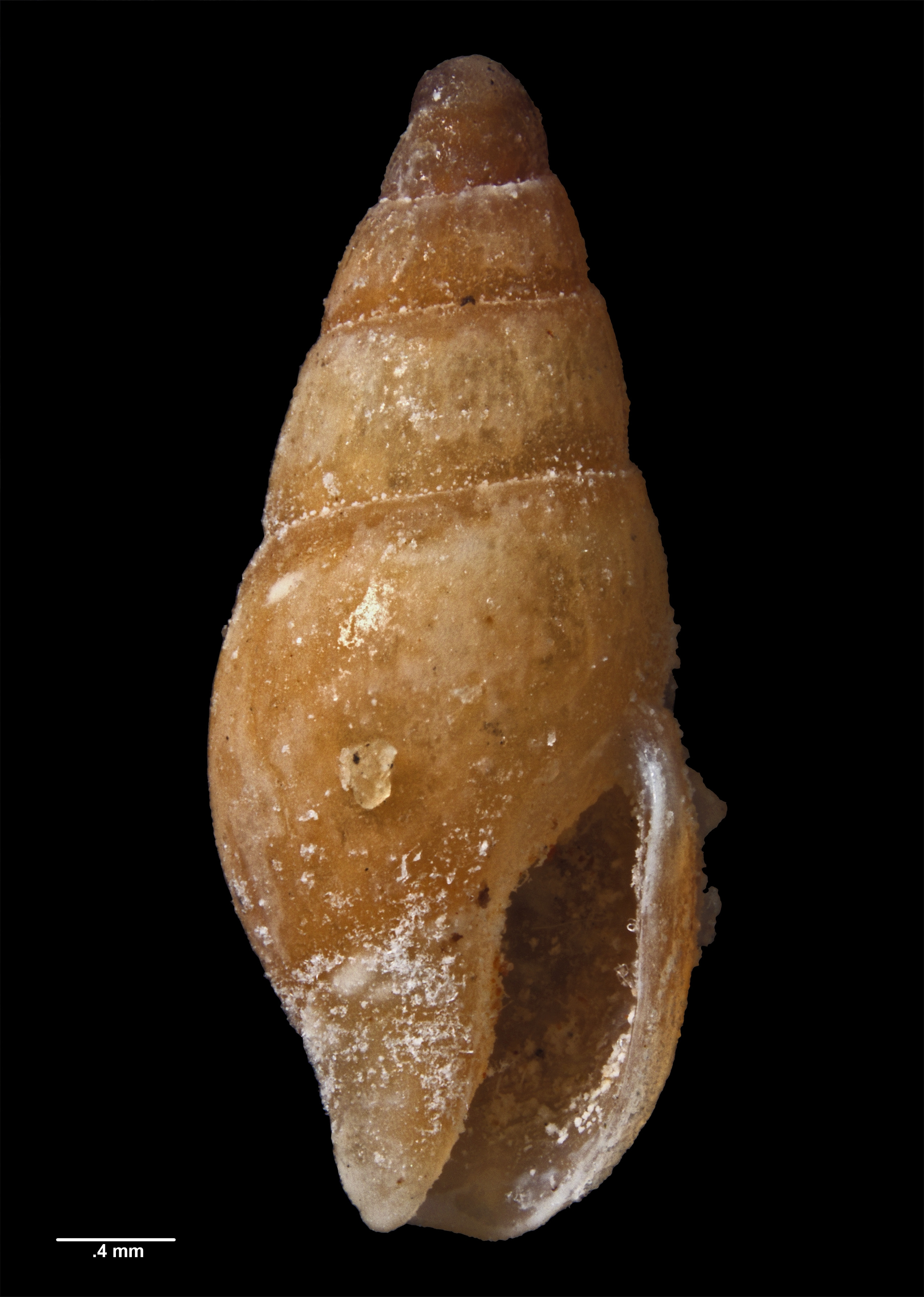
- Holotype from the Auckland War Memorial Museum

Scientific classification
- Kingdom: Animalia
- Phylum: Mollusca
- Class: Gastropoda
- Subclass: Caenogastropoda
- Order: Neogastropoda
- Superfamily: Buccinoidea
- Family: Columbellidae
- Genus: Zemitrella
- Species: Z. finlayi

Binomial name
- Zemitrella finlayi A. W. B. Powell, 1933

= Zemitrella finlayi =

Species of sea snail

Zemitrella finlayi is a species of sea snail, a marine gastropod mollusc in the family Columbellidae, the dove snails. Endemic to New Zealand, the species was originally thought to only occur in the Chatham Islands, but has since been found to occur widely across New Zealand.

== Description ==
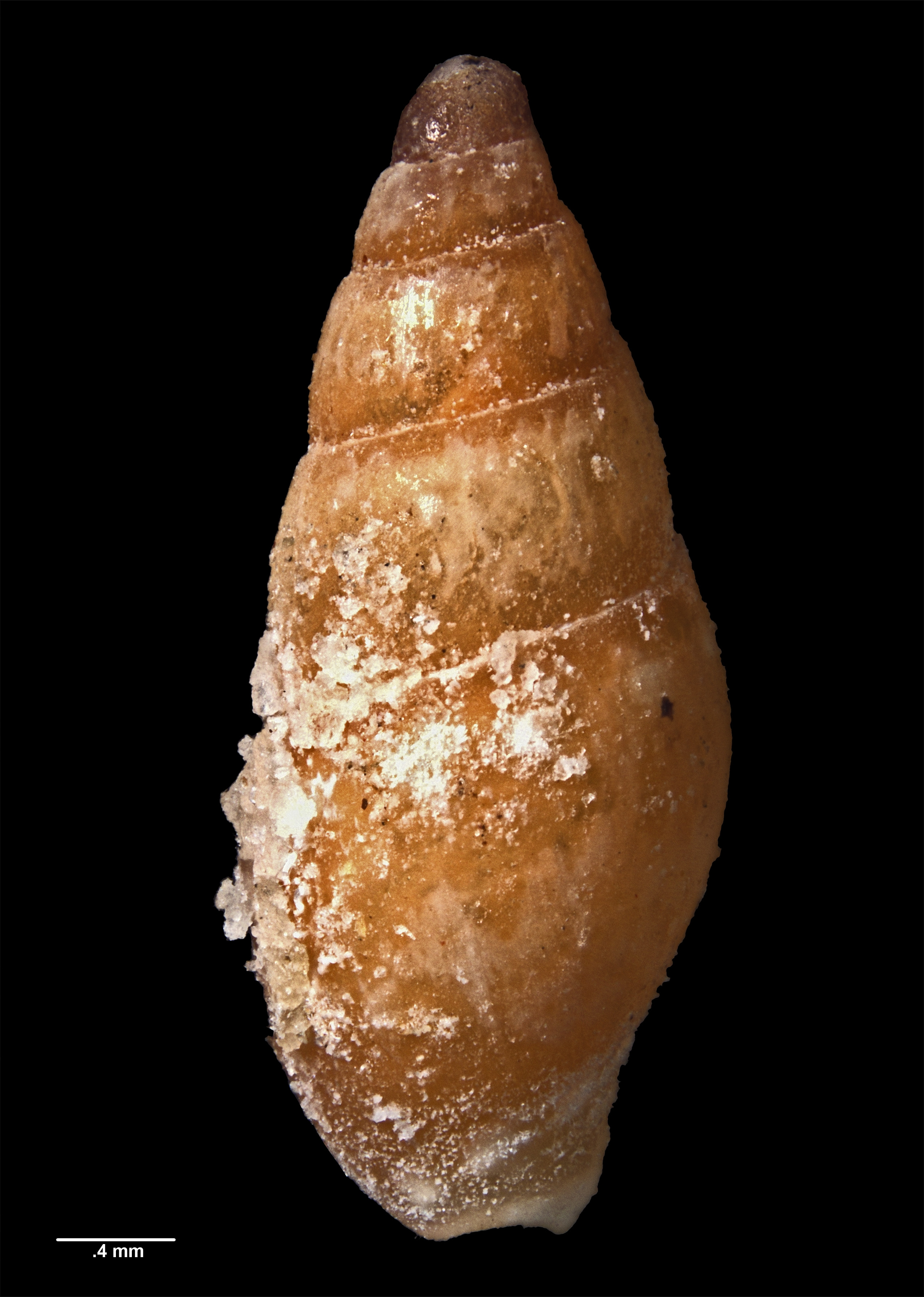
Reverse view of holotype

In the original description, Powell described the species as follows:

Shell small, elongate-oval. Whorls 5, including typical protoconch of two smooth papillate whorls. Spire tall, conical, one and a fourth times height of aperture. Body-whorl narrow, almost cylindrical. The only sculpture consists of eight closely spaced spiral striae at the anterior end of the body-whorl. Colour yellowish-brown, with a very narrow white line below the periphery and a spiral series of widely spaced dots just below, while on the sculptured anterior end there is a further series of white dots. In some of the paratypes there is in addition a peripheral series of white dots on the body-whorl, and in a few others all three white zones are more or less connected axially by zigzag white lines. Base of pillar with a very weak oblique plait, which is most distinct in half-grown shells.

The shell of holotype of the species measures 4 mm (0.16 in) in height and 1.7 mm (0.067 in) in diameter. It differs from Z. choava by having a less inflated body-whorl, fewer anterior end spirals, and by being more narrowly ovate and smaller. Similar in size to Z. fallax, the species can be identified due to its more narrowly ovate outlines on the shell of Z. finlayi.

== Taxonomy ==
The species was first described by A. W. B. Powell in 1933. The holotype was collected by Powell himself in February 1933, from shell sand at Waitangi in the Chatham Islands. The holotype is held by the Auckland War Memorial Museum.

== Distribution and habitat ==
Z. finlayi is endemic to New Zealand, found across the waters of the New Zealand mainland, Stewart Island, the Snares Islands, and the Chatham Islands, at a depth of between 0–415 m (0–1,362 ft). Originally thought to be endemic to the Chatham Islands, the species has since been identified across New Zealand, including the far north, far south, islands off the east coast including the Poor Knights Islands, Great Barrier Island, Whakaari / White Island, and the Tasman Sea coast of both the North and South islands.
