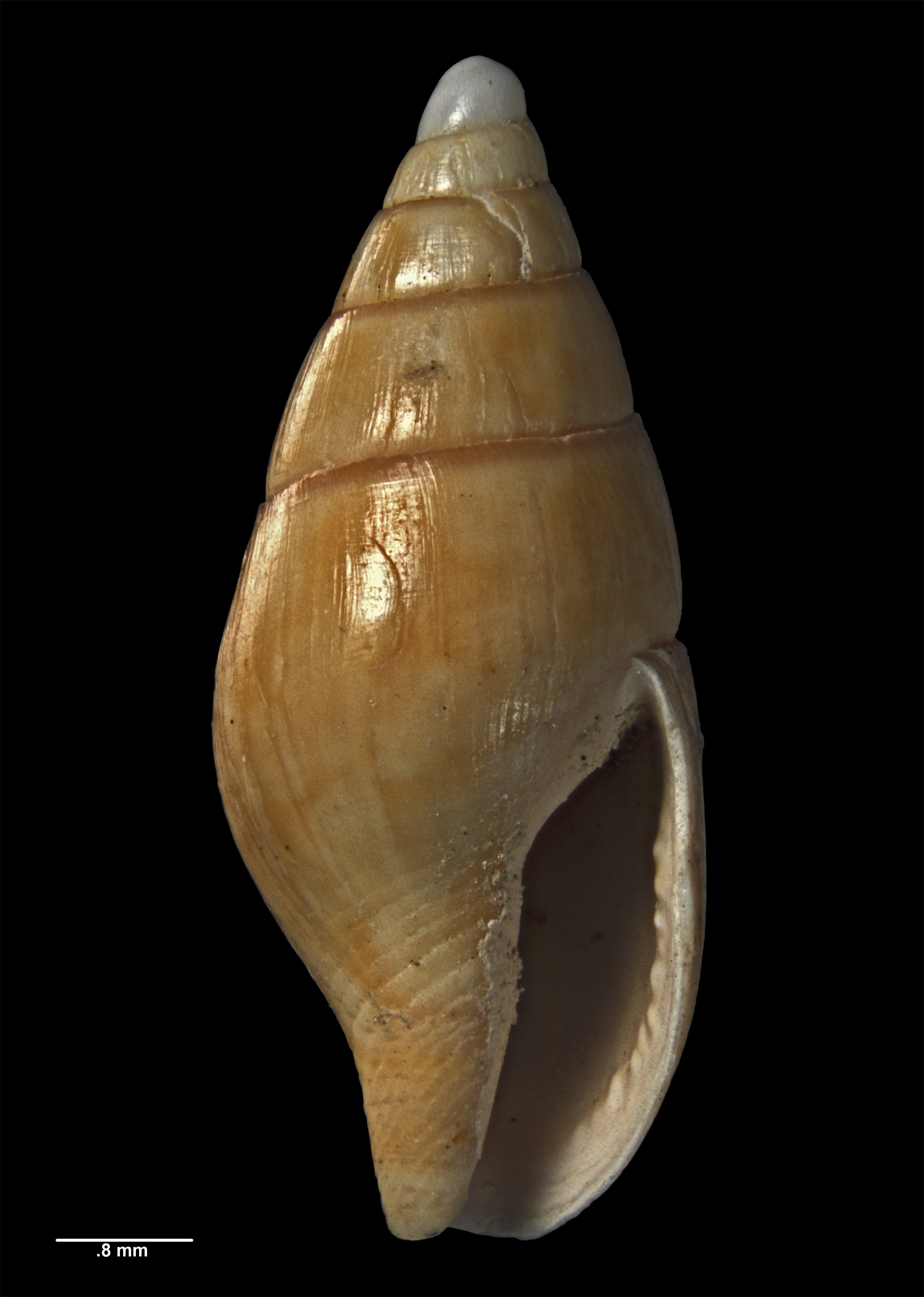
- Holotype from Auckland War Memorial Museum

Scientific classification
- Kingdom: Animalia
- Phylum: Mollusca
- Class: Gastropoda
- Subclass: Caenogastropoda
- Order: Neogastropoda
- Family: Columbellidae
- Genus: Zemitrella
- Species: †Z. contigua

Binomial name
- †Zemitrella contigua A. W. B. Powell, 1934

= Zemitrella contigua =

Zemitrella contigua Temporal range: Late Pleistocene

Extinct species of gastropod

Zemitrella contigua is an extinct species of sea snail, a marine gastropod mollusc, in the family Columbellidae, the dove snails. Fossils of the species date to the Late Pleistocene, and occur in the strata of Te Piki in the eastern Bay of Plenty, New Zealand.

== Description ==
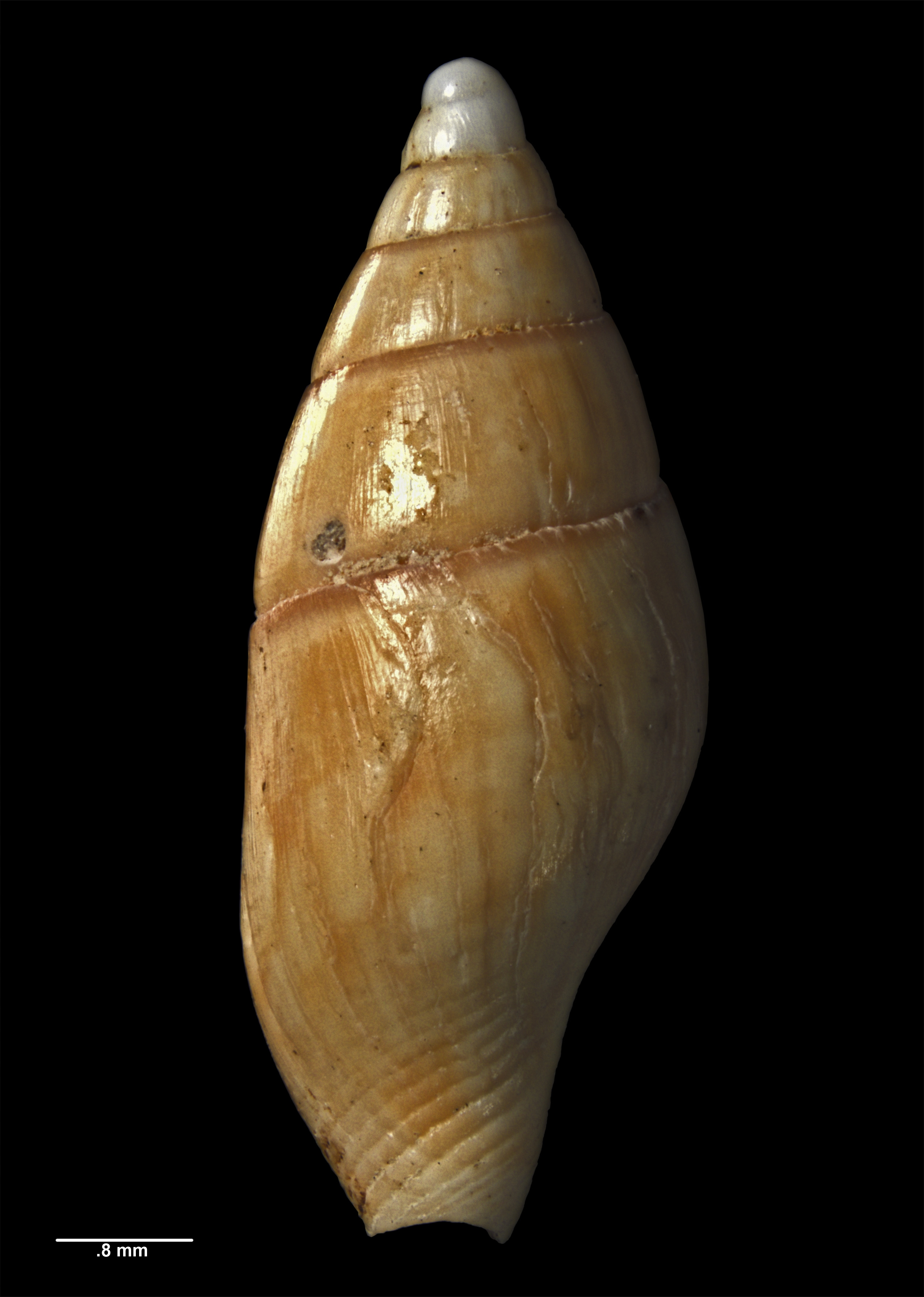
Reverse view of holotype

In the original description, Powell described the species as follows:

Shell moderately large for the genus, smooth and polished except for about eight evenly spaced weak spirals upon the neck of the base, and another eight much more closely spaced and less prominent upon the fasciole. Spire about equal to height of aperture, outlines only slightly convex. Whorls 5½, plus smooth papillate protoconch of 1½ whorls. Suture linear, false margined below, by the base of the upper-whorl showing through. Body-whorl evenly rounded, but not bulging. Aperture long and narrow, sides parallel medially. Outer-lip vertical above, rounded and contracted basally; without a distinct canal, but there is a shallow anterior sinus. Within the outer-lip there are about ten weak denticles. Columella straight and vertical medially, and with a distinct oblique plait at the base.

The holotype of the species measures 7 mm (0.28 in) in height and 2.95 mm (0.116 in) in diameter. The species has a slightly larger and less massive shell compared to Zemitrella choava, as well as a thin outer lip and a relatively longer and narrow aperture. The neck of base of the shell is more deeply contracted than in Z. choava.

== Taxonomy ==
The species was first described by A.W.B. Powell in 1934. The holotype was collected by Powell in August 1933 from 6 km (3.7 mi) east of Cape Runaway in the Bay of Plenty Region, and is held by the Auckland War Memorial Museum.

== Distribution ==
This extinct marine species dates to the Late Pleistocene (Haweran), and is only known to occur in the strata of the Waipaoa Formation (Te Piki Member), in the eastern Bay of Plenty, New Zealand.
