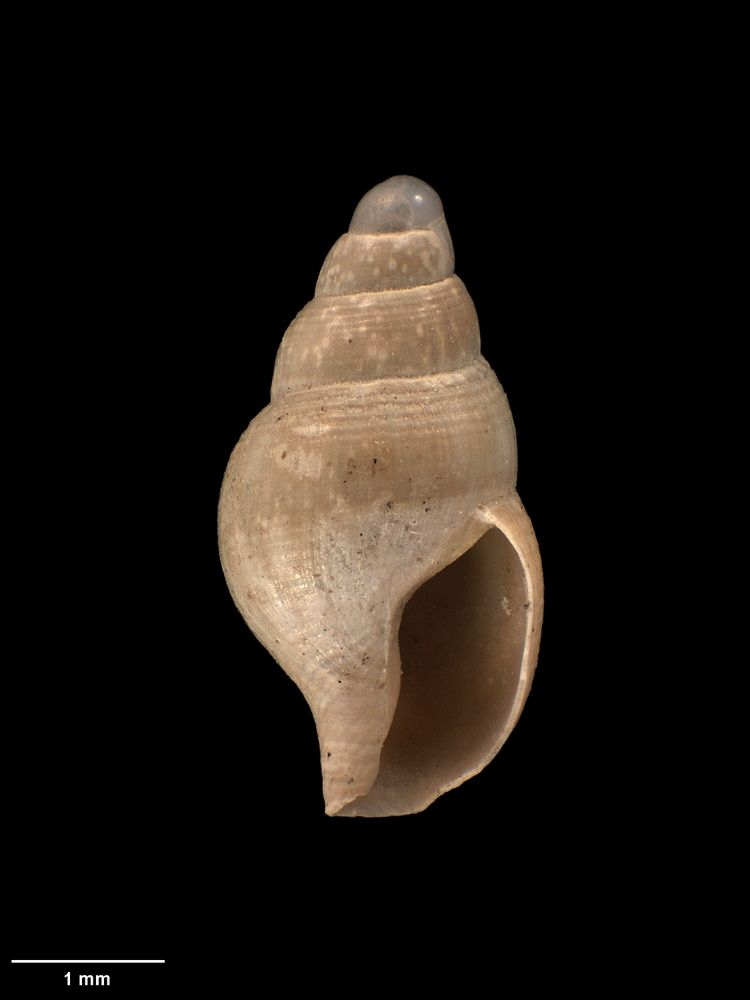
- Shell of Zemitrella benthicola (specimen at the Museum of New Zealand)

Scientific classification
- Kingdom: Animalia
- Phylum: Mollusca
- Class: Gastropoda
- Subclass: Caenogastropoda
- Order: Neogastropoda
- Superfamily: Buccinoidea
- Family: Columbellidae
- Genus: Zemitrella
- Species: Z. benthicola

Binomial name
- Zemitrella benthicola Dell, 1956

= Zemitrella benthicola =

Species of sea snail

Zemitrella benthicola is a species of sea snail, a marine gastropod mollusk in the family Columbellidae, the dove snails.

Subspecies

- † Zemitrella benthicola elongata Beu, 1967:synonym of † Zemitrella elongata Beu, 1967

== Description ==
The length of the shell attains 4.5 mm, its diameter 2.2 mm.

== Distribution ==
This marine species is endemic to New Zealand and occurs off eastern Otago, Karitane Canyon.
