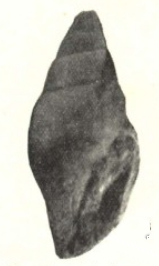
- Shell of Zemitrella mahoenuica (holotype)

Scientific classification
- Kingdom: Animalia
- Phylum: Mollusca
- Class: Gastropoda
- Subclass: Caenogastropoda
- Order: Neogastropoda
- Superfamily: Buccinoidea
- Family: Columbellidae
- Genus: Zemitrella
- Species: †Z. mahoenuica

Binomial name
- †Zemitrella mahoenuica Laws, 1935

= Zemitrella mahoenuica =

Species of sea snail

Zemitrella mahoenuica is an extinct species of sea snail, a marine gastropod mollusk in the family Columbellidae, the dove snails.

== Description ==
The shell of Zemitrella mahoenuica can reach a length of 3.9 mm (0.15 in) and a diameter of 1.7 mm (0.067 in).

The shell is very small. The spire is biconic, its height of the spire about half that of the aperture. There are four post-nuclear whorls. The protoconch is damaged. The whorls are very lightly convex. The suture is slightly above the periphery and more distinct of that of Zemitrella haroldi. The whorls of the spire are devoid of sculpture, save for a single distinct incised line as a submargin to the suture. The body whorl is broadly convex in a single sweep from suture to the base where it very slowly retreats to the axis of the shell. The base is only slightly excavated. The basal threads are about the same as in Z. haroldi. The aperture is long and narrow, filled with a hard matrix. The shell is strongly variced near the outer lip. The base of the columella is flexed a little to the left.

== Distribution ==
Zemitrella haroldi is endemic to New Zealand. Fossils have been found in Tertiary strata near the Awakino River.
