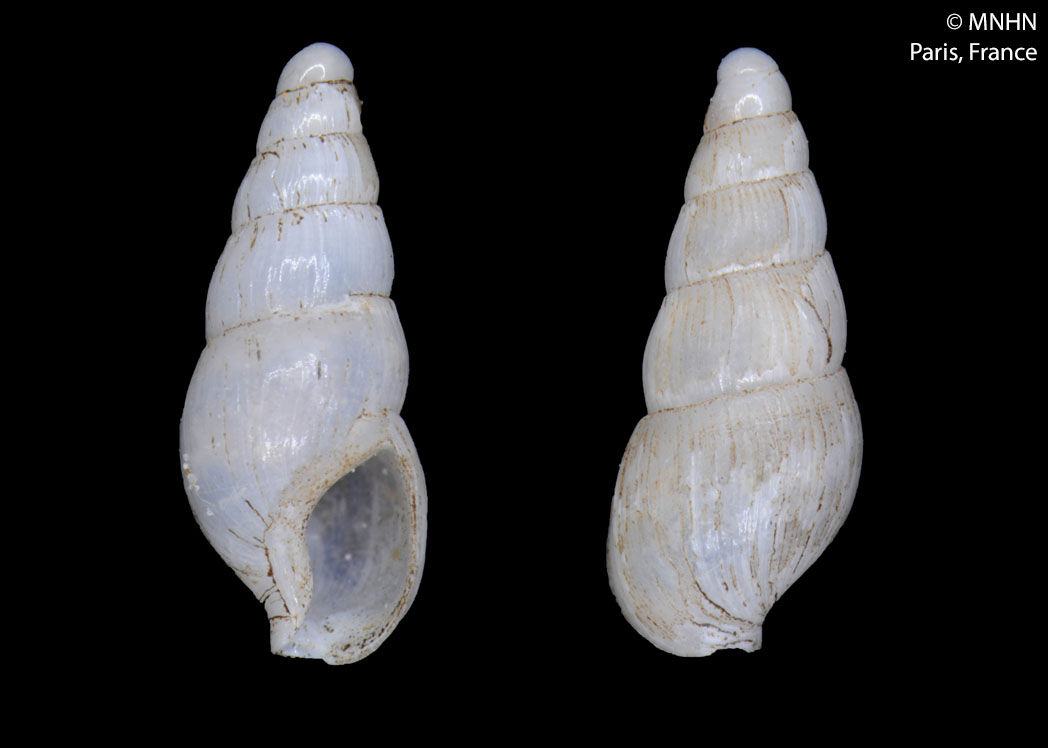
- Zemitrella tenuicostata

Scientific classification
- Kingdom: Animalia
- Phylum: Mollusca
- Class: Gastropoda
- Subclass: Caenogastropoda
- Order: Neogastropoda
- Superfamily: Buccinoidea
- Family: Columbellidae
- Genus: Zemitrella; Finlay, 1926

Type species
- Lachesis sulcata F. W. Hutton, 1873

= Zemitrella =

Genus of sea snails

Zemitrella is a genus of sea snails, marine gastropod mollusks in the family Columbellidae, the dove snails.

== Species ==
Species within the genus Zemitrella include:

- Zemitrella annectens Powell, 1937
- Zemitrella attenuata Powell, 1940
- Zemitrella bandaensis Hoffman, K. Monsecour & Freiwald, 2019
- Zemitrella benthicola Dell, 1956
- † Zemitrella bikiniensis Ladd, 1977
- Zemitrella brunnescens (Thiele, 1925)
- Zemitrella cera Okutani, 1964
- Zemitrella choava (Reeve, 1859)
- Zemitrella circumcincta Dell, 1962
- Zemitrella contigua Powell, 1934
- Zemitrella daemona (W. H. Webster, 1906)
- † Zemitrella elongata Beu, 1967
- Zemitrella epicroca K. Monsecour & D. Monsecour, 2016
- Zemitrella fallax Powell, 1940
- Zemitrella finlayi Powell, 1933
- † Zemitrella haroldi Laws, 1935
- Zemitrella helena (Thiele, 1925)
- Zemitrella hella (Thiele, 1925)
- Zemitrella laevigata (Suter, 1908)
- Zemitrella laevirostris Powell, 1940
- † Zemitrella mahoenuica Laws, 1935
- Zemitrella parhelena (Barnard, 1959)
- Zemitrella pseudomarginata (Suter, 1908)
- Zemitrella pura (E. von Martens, 1904)
- Zemitrella regis Powell, 1940
- Zemitrella rosea (F. W. Hutton, 1873)
- Zemitrella sericea Powell, 1937
- Zemitrella siligo Okutani, 1964
- Zemitrella spengleri Lussi, 2009
- Zemitrella spreta (Thiele, 1925)
- Zemitrella stephanophora (Suter, 1908)
- † Zemitrella subsuturalis C. A. Fleming, 1943
- Zemitrella sulcata (F. W. Hutton, 1873)
- Zemitrella tenuicostata K. Monsecour & D. Monsecour, 2016
- Zemitrella turgida Powell, 1937
- Zemitrella websteri (Suter, 1913)
- Zemitrella whangaroaensis Dell, 1956

Synonyms

- Zemitrella brunescens (W. H. Turton, 1932): synonym of Zemitrella hella (Thiele, 1925)
- Zemitrella constans Powell, 1955: synonym of Zemitrella sulcata constans Powell, 1955 (original combination)
- Zemitrella curvirostris Powell, 1937: synonym of Zemitrella laevigata curvirostris Powell, 1937 (original combination)
- Zemitrella indistincta (Thiele, 1925): synonym of Costoanachis indistincta (Thiele, 1925)
- † Zemitrella muscula Ludbrook, 1941 : synonym of † Dentimitrella muscula (Ludbrook, 1941)
