= Costoanachis semiplicata =

Scientific classification
- Kingdom: Animalia
- Phylum: Mollusca
- Class: Gastropoda
- Subclass: Caenogastropoda
- Order: Neogastropoda
- Family: Columbellidae
- Genus: Costoanachis
- Species: C. semiplicata

Binomial name
- Costoanachis semiplicata (Stearns, 1873)

Synonyms
- Anachis semiplicata Stearns, 1873

Species of gastropod

Costoanachis semiplicata is a species of sea snail, a marine gastropod mollusc in the family Columbellidae, the dove snails.
