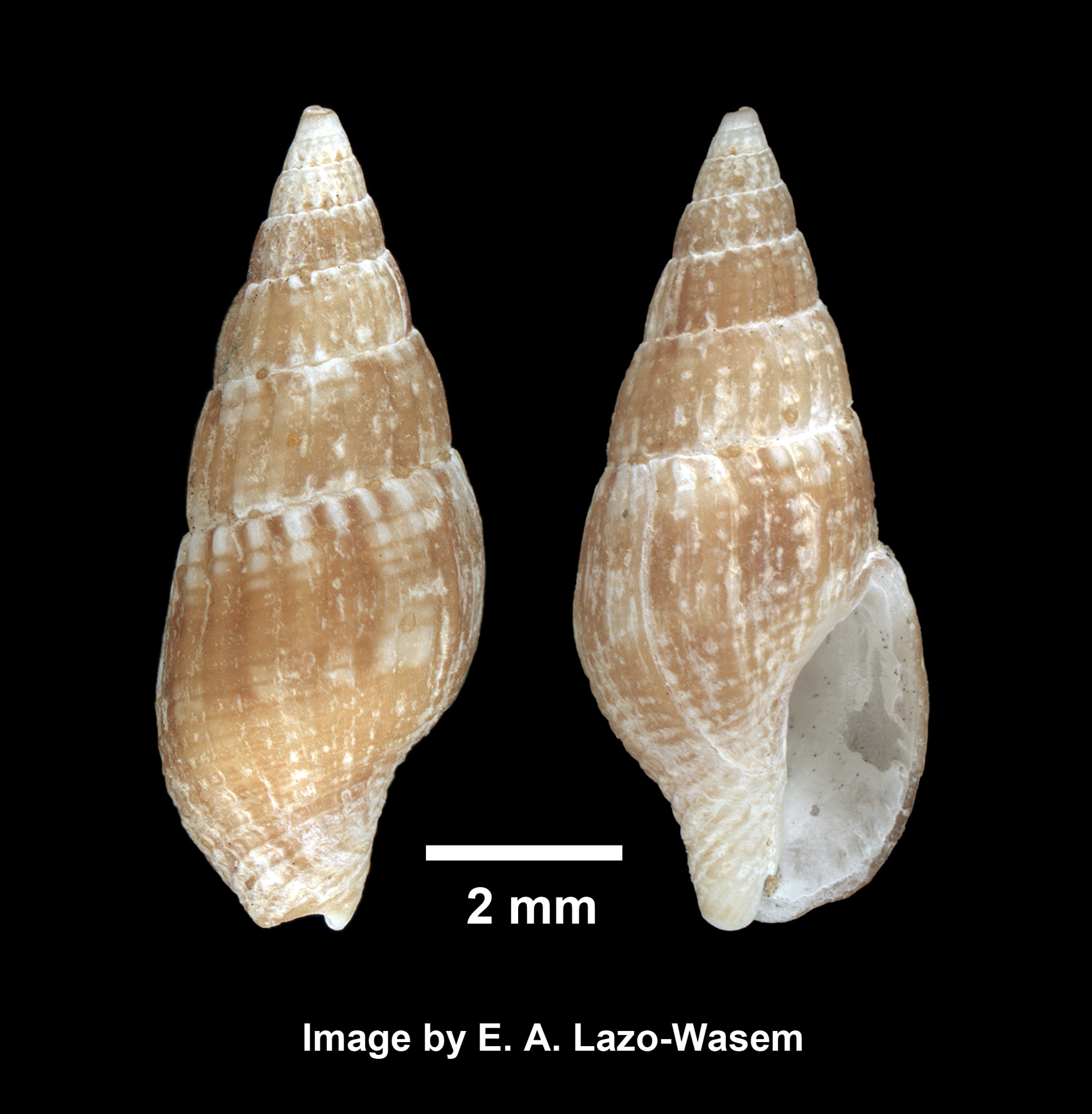

Scientific classification
- Kingdom: Animalia
- Phylum: Mollusca
- Class: Gastropoda
- Subclass: Caenogastropoda
- Order: Neogastropoda
- Family: Columbellidae
- Genus: Costoanachis
- Species: C. translirata

Binomial name
- Costoanachis translirata (Ravenel, 1861)

= Costoanachis translirata =

Species of gastropod

Costoanachis translirata is a species of sea snail, a marine gastropod mollusk in the family Columbellidae, the dove snails.

== Distribution ==
This species is distributed in the Gulf of Mexico and in the Caribbean Sea
