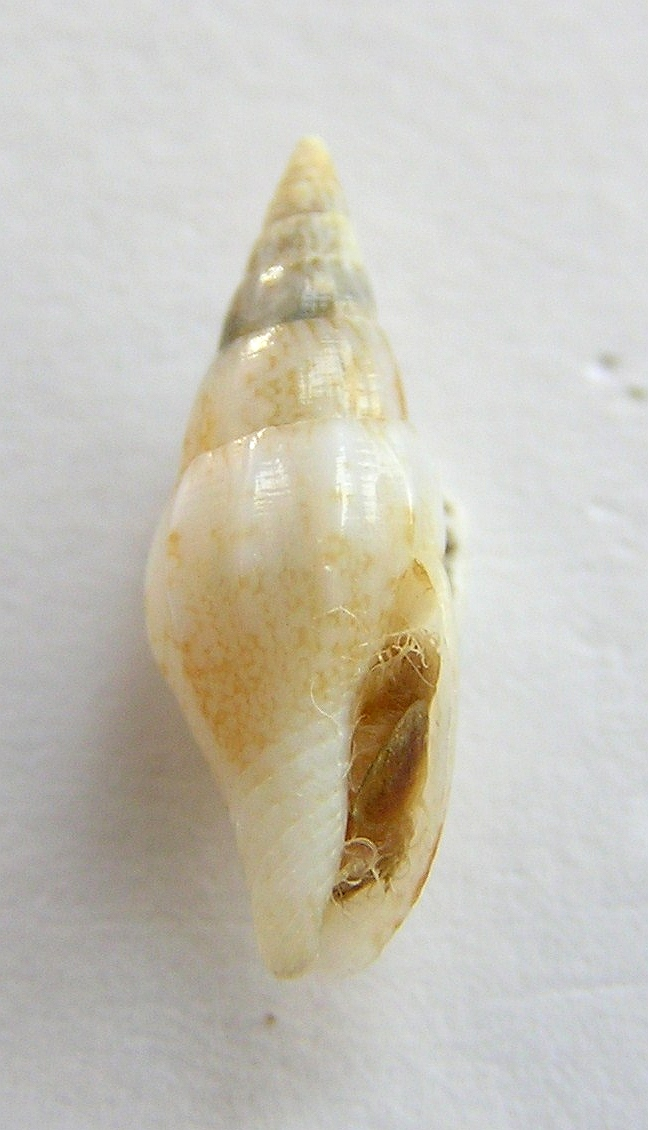
- Apertural view of a shell of Costoanachis avara

Scientific classification
- Kingdom: Animalia
- Phylum: Mollusca
- Class: Gastropoda
- Subclass: Caenogastropoda
- Order: Neogastropoda
- Family: Columbellidae
- Genus: Costoanachis
- Species: C. avara

Binomial name
- Costoanachis avara (Say, 1822)

Synonyms
- Anachis avara (Say T., 1822); Anachis (Costoanachis) avara (Say, T., 1822); Columbella avara Say, 1822 (original combination)

= Costoanachis avara =

Species of gastropod

Costoanachis avara, the greedy dove shell, is a species of sea snail, a marine gastropod mollusc in the family Columbellidae, the dove snails.

== Description ==
The length of the shell varies between 8 mm and 19 mm.

== Distribution ==
This species occurs in the Northwest Atlantic Ocean from Massachusetts to Florida; in the Gulf of Mexico and in the Caribbean Sea.
