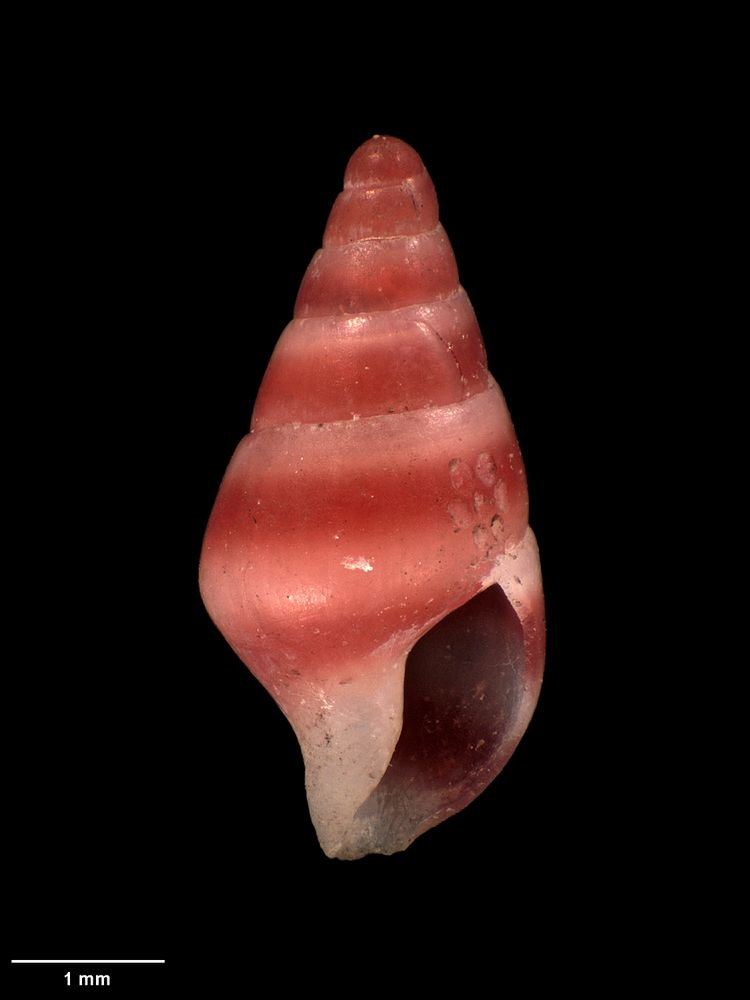
- Shell of Zemitrella rosea (specimen at the Museum of New Zealand Te Papa Tongarewa)

Scientific classification
- Kingdom: Animalia
- Phylum: Mollusca
- Class: Gastropoda
- Subclass: Caenogastropoda
- Order: Neogastropoda
- Superfamily: Buccinoidea
- Family: Columbellidae
- Genus: Zemitrella
- Species: Z. rosea

Binomial name
- Zemitrella rosea (F. W. Hutton, 1873)

Synonyms
- Alcira sanguinea Suter, 1908; Columbella pseutes Suter, 1906; Obeliscus roseus F. W. Hutton, 1873 (superseded combination)

= Zemitrella rosea =

Species of sea snail

Zemitrella rosea is a species of sea snail, a marine gastropod mollusk in the family Columbellidae, the dove snails.

== Description ==
The height of the shell attains 6 mm, its diameter 3 mm.

(Original description) The shell is turreted. The whorls are flattened and smooth. The aperture is semi-oval, entire, and rounded anteriorly. The columella is straight, with more or less numerous folds.

The shell is white, or pinkish and is spirally banded with dark pink.

== Distribution ==
This marine species is endemic to New Zealand and occurs off Cook Strait southwards and southern islands.
