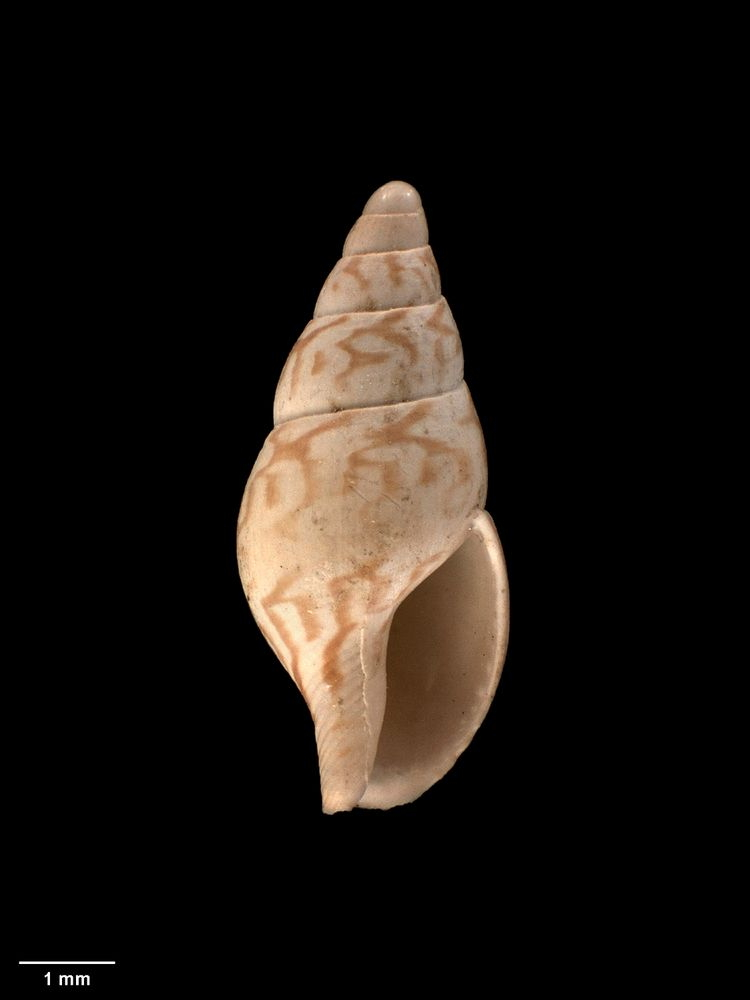
- Shell of Zemitrella daemona (specimen at Museum of New Zealand Te Papa Tongarewa)

Scientific classification
- Kingdom: Animalia
- Phylum: Mollusca
- Class: Gastropoda
- Subclass: Caenogastropoda
- Order: Neogastropoda
- Superfamily: Buccinoidea
- Family: Columbellidae
- Genus: Zemitrella
- Species: Z. daemona

Binomial name
- Zemitrella daemona (W. H. Webster, 1906)

Synonyms
- Columbella daemona W. H. Webster, 1906 superseded combination

= Zemitrella daemona =

Species of sea snail

Zemitrella daemona is a species of sea snail, a marine gastropod mollusk in the family Columbellidae, the dove snails.

== Description ==
The length of the shell attains 7 mm, its diameter 2 mm.

(Original description) The shell is dull and displays a pale cream colour marked with rufous tones. It consists of five slightly rounded whorls: the first appears glossy and lacks any sculpture, while the second is finely striated in a radiating pattern. The sutures are well marked, and the columella stands vertical with a slight covering of enamel. The lip is thin and bears about twelve faint denticles. The siphonal canal shows approximately fifteen obscure striations, and the entire shell is covered with fine incremental striae.

== Distribution ==
This marine species is endemic to New Zealand and occurs off Northland to Bay of Plenty.
