= Zemitrella hella =

Scientific classification
- Kingdom: Animalia
- Phylum: Mollusca
- Class: Gastropoda
- Subclass: Caenogastropoda
- Order: Neogastropoda
- Superfamily: Buccinoidea
- Family: Columbellidae
- Genus: Zemitrella
- Species: Z. hella

Binomial name
- Zemitrella hella (Thiele, 1925)

Synonyms
- Columbella brunescens W. H. Turton, 1932 (non Thiele, 1925); Columbella hella Thiele, 1925 (original combination); Zemitrella brunescens (W. H. Turton, 1932) ·

Species of sea snail

Zemitrella hella is a species of sea snail, a marine gastropod mollusk in the family Columbellidae, the dove snails.

== Distribution ==
This marine species occurs off Port Alfred, South Africa.
