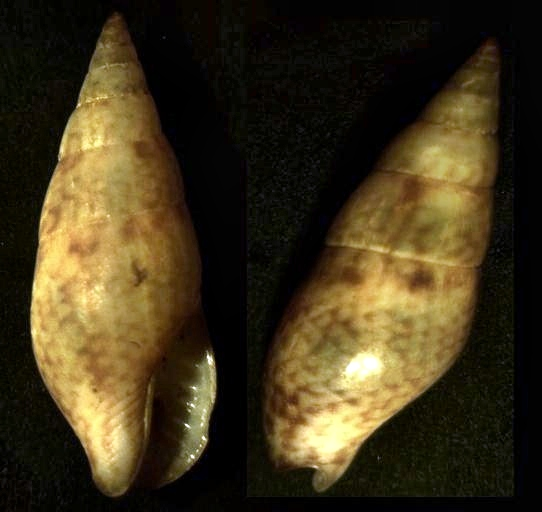

Scientific classification
- Kingdom: Animalia
- Phylum: Mollusca
- Class: Gastropoda
- Subclass: Caenogastropoda
- Order: Neogastropoda
- Family: Columbellidae
- Genus: Costoanachis
- Species: C. sertulariarum

Binomial name
- Costoanachis sertulariarum (d'Orbigny, 1839)

= Costoanachis sertulariarum =

Species of sea snail

Costoanachis sertulariarum is a species of sea snail, a marine gastropod mollusc in the family Columbellidae, the dove snails.

== Distribution ==
This marine species occurs off French Guiana.
