= Zemitrella helena =

Scientific classification
- Kingdom: Animalia
- Phylum: Mollusca
- Class: Gastropoda
- Subclass: Caenogastropoda
- Order: Neogastropoda
- Superfamily: Buccinoidea
- Family: Columbellidae
- Genus: Zemitrella
- Species: Z. helena

Binomial name
- Zemitrella helena (Thiele, 1925)

Synonyms
- Columbella helena Thiele, 1925 (original combination); Mitrella helena (Thiele, 1925)

Species of sea snail

Zemitrella helena is a species of sea snail, a marine gastropod mollusk in the family Columbellidae, the dove snails.

== Description ==
The length of the shell varies between 10 mm and 15 mm.

== Distribution ==
This marine species occurs off the Agulhas Bank, South Africa.
