= Retizafra decussata =

Scientific classification
- Kingdom: Animalia
- Phylum: Mollusca
- Class: Gastropoda
- Subclass: Caenogastropoda
- Order: Neogastropoda
- Family: Columbellidae
- Genus: Retizafra
- Species: R. decussata

Binomial name
- Retizafra decussata (Lussi, 2002)

Synonyms
- Zafrona decussata Lussi, 2002 (basionym)

Species of gastropod

Retizafra decussata is a species of sea snail, a marine gastropod mollusc in the family Columbellidae, the dove snails.
