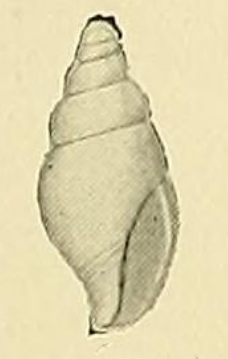
- Shell of Zemitrella laevigata (holotype)

Scientific classification
- Kingdom: Animalia
- Phylum: Mollusca
- Class: Gastropoda
- Subclass: Caenogastropoda
- Order: Neogastropoda
- Superfamily: Buccinoidea
- Family: Columbellidae
- Genus: Zemitrella
- Species: Z. laevigata

Binomial name
- Zemitrella laevigata (Suter, 1908)

Synonyms
- Alcira laevigata Suter, 1908 (original combination)

= Zemitrella laevigata =

Species of sea snail

Zemitrella laevigata is a species of sea snail, a marine gastropod mollusk in the family Columbellidae, the dove snails.

Subspecies

- Zemitrella laevigata curvirostris A. W. B. Powell, 1937
- Zemitrella laevigata laevigata (Suter, 1908)

== Description ==
The length of the shell attains 4.1 mm, its diameter 1.8 mm.

(Original description) The small shell is thin, translucent, smooth, faintly shining and elongately oval. The sculpture is confined to a few oblique ridges on the lower part of the base. The colour is yellowish white, sometimes faintly marbled with pure white.

The spire is elevated, conic and about the same height as the aperture. The outlines are almost straight. The protoconch consists of 1½ smooth, porcellanous whorls. The nucleus is a little oblique. The shell contains 5 whorls, regularly increasing and a lightly convex. The body whorl is rounded and contracted at the base. The suture is deep. The aperture is subvertical, high and narrow, lightly channelled above, and with a very short, widely open siphonal canal below. The outer lip is slightly curved, sharp, but little thickened. The columella is vertical, with a deep-seated oblique fold at the base. The inner lip is very narrow and thin, extending over the flattish parietal wall. The operculum is unknown.

== Distribution ==
This marine species is endemic to New Zealand and occurs off Northland to East Cape.
