= Zemitrella parhelena =

Scientific classification
- Kingdom: Animalia
- Phylum: Mollusca
- Class: Gastropoda
- Subclass: Caenogastropoda
- Order: Neogastropoda
- Superfamily: Buccinoidea
- Family: Columbellidae
- Genus: Zemitrella
- Species: Z. parhelena

Binomial name
- Zemitrella parhelena (Barnard, 1959)

Synonyms
- Pyrene parhelena Barnard, 1959

Species of sea snail

Zemitrella parhelena is a species of sea snail, a marine gastropod mollusk in the family Columbellidae, the dove snails.

== Description ==
The length of the shell varies between 10 mm and 17 mm.

== Distribution ==
This marine species is endemic to South Africa and occurs on the Agulhas Bank.
