= Zemitrella brunnescens =

Scientific classification
- Kingdom: Animalia
- Phylum: Mollusca
- Class: Gastropoda
- Subclass: Caenogastropoda
- Order: Neogastropoda
- Superfamily: Buccinoidea
- Family: Columbellidae
- Genus: Zemitrella
- Species: Z. brunnescens

Binomial name
- Zemitrella brunnescens (Thiele, 1925)

Synonyms
- Columbella brunnescens Thiele, 1925 (original combination)

Species of sea snail

Zemitrella brunnescens is a species of sea snail, a marine gastropod mollusk in the family Columbellidae, the dove snails.

== Distribution ==
This marine species occurs off South Africa.
