= Costoanachis rudyi =

Scientific classification
- Kingdom: Animalia
- Phylum: Mollusca
- Class: Gastropoda
- Subclass: Caenogastropoda
- Order: Neogastropoda
- Family: Columbellidae
- Genus: Costoanachis
- Species: C. rudyi

Binomial name
- Costoanachis rudyi Espinosa & Ortea, 2006

Species of gastropod

Costoanachis rudyi is a species of sea snail, a marine gastropod mollusc in the family Columbellidae, the dove snails. Can be found in the Guanahacabibes peninsula of Cuba
