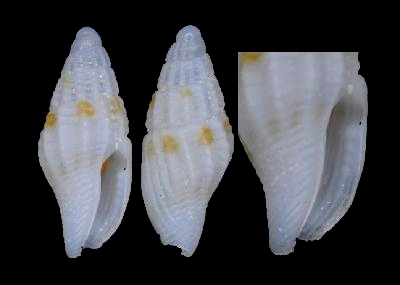
- Shells of Retizafra mitromorpha (holotype in the MNHN, Paris)

Scientific classification
- Kingdom: Animalia
- Phylum: Mollusca
- Class: Gastropoda
- Subclass: Caenogastropoda
- Order: Neogastropoda
- Superfamily: Buccinoidea
- Family: Columbellidae
- Genus: Retizafra; Hedley, 1913

Type species
- Pyrene gemmulifera Hedley, 1907

Synonyms
- Zafra (Retizafra) Hedley, 1913 (original rank)

= Retizafra =

Genus of gastropods

Retizafra is a genus of sea snails, marine gastropod molluscs in the family Columbellidae, the dove snails.

== Species ==
Species within the genus Retizafra include:

- Retizafra brevilata K. Monsecour & D. Monsecour, 2016
- Retizafra bulbacea K. Monsecour & D. Monsecour, 2016
- Retizafra calva (Verco, 1910)
- Retizafra cryptheliae K. Monsecour & D. Monsecour, 2016
- Retizafra decussata (Lussi, 2002)
- Retizafra dentilabia (Lussi, 2009)
- Retizafra gemmulifera (Hedley, 1907)
- Retizafra helenae K. Monsecour & D. Monsecour, 2018
- Retizafra hordeum K. Monsecour & D. Monsecour, 2016
- Retizafra intricata (Hedley, 1912)
- Retizafra macumae Hoffman, K. Monsecour & Freiwald, 2019
- Retizafra meyeri K. Monsecour & D. Monsecour, 2018
- Retizafra mitromorpha K. Monsecour & D. Monsecour, 2016
- Retizafra multicostata (May, 1911)
- † Retizafra oligomiocaenica Lozouet, 1999
- Retizafra oryza K. Monsecour & D. Monsecour, 2016
- Retizafra plexa (Hedley, 1902)
- † Retizafra rissoides (Grateloup, 1834)
- Retizafra rotundata K. Monsecour & D. Monsecour, 2016
- Retizafra salvati K. Monsecour & D. Monsecour, 2018
- Retizafra tamxatensis Hoffman, K. Monsecour & Freiwald, 2019
- † Retizafra toreuma Maxwell, 1988
- Retizafra tuamotuensis K. Monsecour & D. Monsecour, 2018
- Retizafra valae (Lussi, 2009)
- Retizafra zingiber K. Monsecour & D. Monsecour, 2016

Species brought into synonymy

- Retizafra fasciata Bozzetti, 2009: synonym of Engina fasciata (Bozzetti, 2009)
