= Zemitrella bandaensis =

Scientific classification
- Kingdom: Animalia
- Phylum: Mollusca
- Class: Gastropoda
- Subclass: Caenogastropoda
- Order: Neogastropoda
- Superfamily: Buccinoidea
- Family: Columbellidae
- Genus: Zemitrella
- Species: Z. bandaensis

Binomial name
- Zemitrella bandaensis Hoffman, K. Monsecour & Freiwald, 2019

Species of sea snail

Zemitrella bandaensis is a species of sea snail, a marine gastropod mollusk in the family Columbellidae, the dove snails.

== Distribution ==
This marine species occurs off Mauritania.
