= Costoanachis carmelita =

Scientific classification
- Kingdom: Animalia
- Phylum: Mollusca
- Class: Gastropoda
- Subclass: Caenogastropoda
- Order: Neogastropoda
- Family: Columbellidae
- Genus: Costoanachis
- Species: C. carmelita

Binomial name
- Costoanachis carmelita Espinosa, Ortea & Fernadez-Garcés, 2007

Species of gastropod

Costoanachis carmelita is a species of sea snail, a marine gastropod mollusc in the family Columbellidae, the dove snails.
