= Costoanachis similis =

Scientific classification
- Kingdom: Animalia
- Phylum: Mollusca
- Class: Gastropoda
- Subclass: Caenogastropoda
- Order: Neogastropoda
- Family: Columbellidae
- Genus: Costoanachis
- Species: C. similis

Binomial name
- Costoanachis similis (Ravenel, 1861)

Species of gastropod

Costoanachis similis is a species of sea snail, a marine gastropod mollusc in the family Columbellidae, the dove snails.
