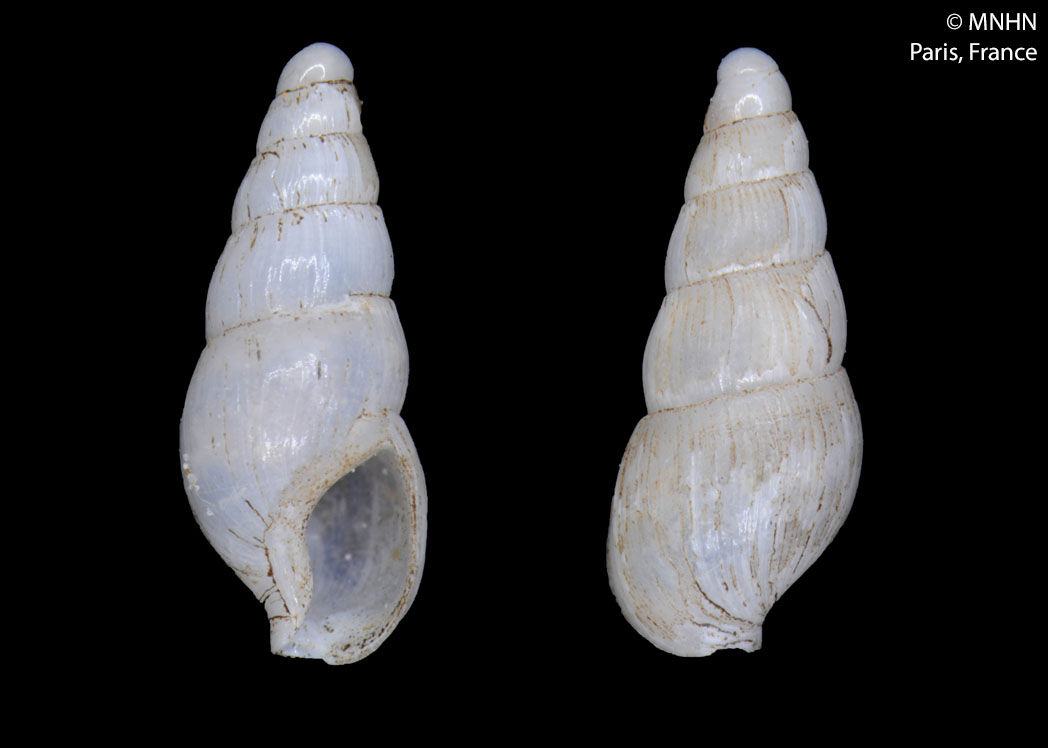
- Shell of Zemitrella tenuicostata (holotype at MNHN, Paris)

Scientific classification
- Kingdom: Animalia
- Phylum: Mollusca
- Class: Gastropoda
- Subclass: Caenogastropoda
- Order: Neogastropoda
- Superfamily: Buccinoidea
- Family: Columbellidae
- Genus: Zemitrella
- Species: Z. tenuicostata

Binomial name
- Zemitrella tenuicostata K. Monsecour & D. Monsecour, 2016

= Zemitrella tenuicostata =

Species of sea snail

Zemitrella tenuicostata is a species of sea snail, a marine gastropod mollusk in the family Columbellidae, the dove snails.

== Description ==
The length of the shell attains 5.6 mm.

== Distribution ==
This marine species occurs off New Caledonia at depths between 1004 m and 1109 m.
