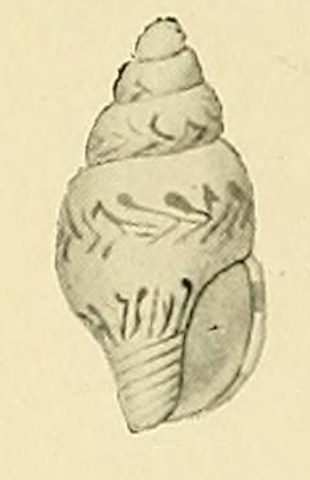
- Shell of Zemitrella stephanophora (holotype)

Scientific classification
- Kingdom: Animalia
- Phylum: Mollusca
- Class: Gastropoda
- Subclass: Caenogastropoda
- Order: Neogastropoda
- Superfamily: Buccinoidea
- Family: Columbellidae
- Genus: Zemitrella
- Species: Z. stephanophora

Binomial name
- Zemitrella stephanophora (Suter, 1908)

Synonyms
- Mitrella stephanophora Suter, 1908

= Zemitrella stephanophora =

Species of sea snail

Zemitrella stephanophora is a species of sea snail, a marine gastropod mollusk in the family Columbellidae, the dove snails.

== Description ==
The length of the shell attains 7.5 mm, its diameter 3.7 mm.

The small shell is ovoid, smooth and polishedand translucent. It is yellowish, with spiral bands of brown zigzag lines on the body whorl.

The sculpture consists of a few close spiral threads upon the short beak. The colour is yellowish white, with fulvous zigzag markings on the later spire whorls, and continued on the periphery of the body whorl, a second similar spiral band upon the base.

The spire is rather short, conical and a little higher than the aperture. The outlines are faintly convex. The protoconch is papillate. The spire contains 5 whorls, regularly increasingand flatly convex. The body whorls id ventricose and rounded. The base of the shell is somewhat contracted. The suture is not much impressed. The aperture is narrow, angled above, not much narrowed below, and without a distinct siphonal canal. The outer lip is straight above, convex below and smooth inside. The columella is subvertical, lightly turned to the left below. The inner lip is very narrow and thin, smooth and spreading over the straight parietal wall. The operculum is unknown. (Original description)

== Distribution ==
This marine species is endemic to New Zealand and occurs off Northland to Mahia.
