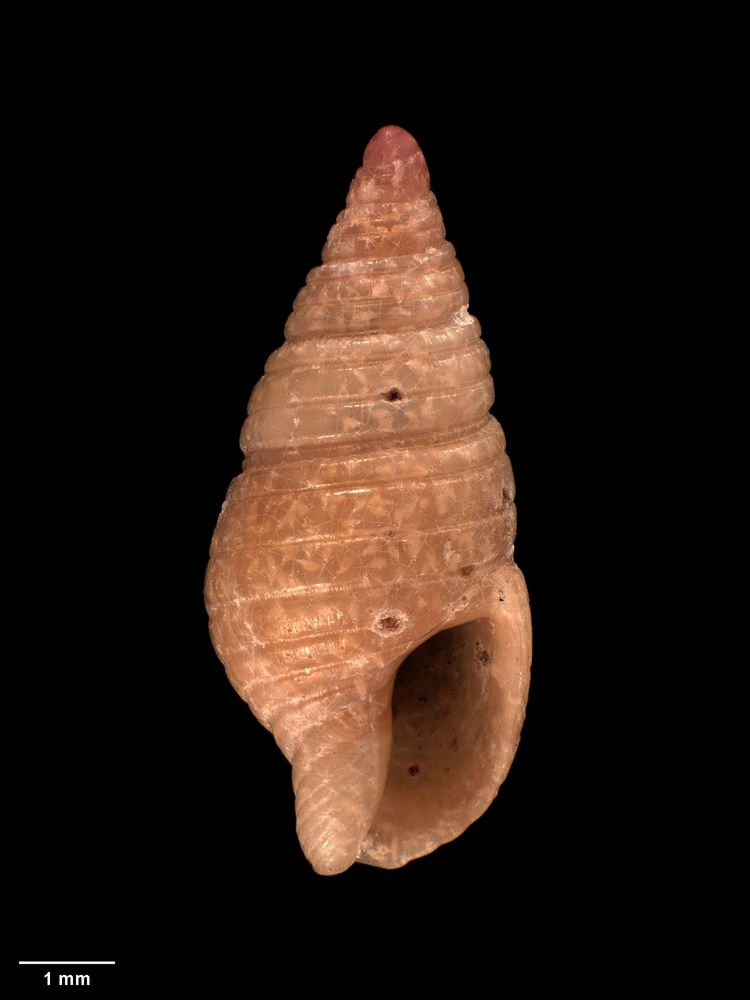
- Shell of Zemitrella sulcata (specimen at Museum of New Zealand Te Papa Tongarewa)

Scientific classification
- Kingdom: Animalia
- Phylum: Mollusca
- Class: Gastropoda
- Subclass: Caenogastropoda
- Order: Neogastropoda
- Superfamily: Buccinoidea
- Family: Columbellidae
- Genus: Zemitrella
- Species: Z. sulcata

Binomial name
- Zemitrella sulcata (F. W. Hutton, 1873)

Synonyms
- Columbella huttoni Suter, 1904 (unused substitute name, see...); Columbella inconstans Suter, 1906; Columbella varians F. W. Hutton, 1885 (invalid: junior homonym of C....); Lachesis sulcata F. W. Hutton, 1873 · unaccepted (original combination)

= Zemitrella sulcata =

Species of sea snail

Zemitrella sulcata is a species of sea snail, a marine gastropod mollusk in the family Columbellidae, the dove snails.

Subspecies

- Zemitrella sulcata constans A. W. B. Powell, 1955
- Zemitrella sulcata sulcata (F. W. Hutton, 1873)

== Description ==
The height of the shell attains 9 mm, its diameter 4 mm.

(Original description) The shell is turreted and show convex whorls. The suture is straight and deep. The aperture is obovate, prolonged into a very short siphonal canal. The body whorl is about as long as the spire. The whorls are rather flattened, deeply distantly spirally grooved, about eight on the body whorl. The outer lip is thickened. The shell is reddish brown, sometimes variegated with white.

== Distribution ==
This marine species is endemic to New Zealand and occurs off South Island, from Cook Strait south to Snares Islands and Auckland Island
