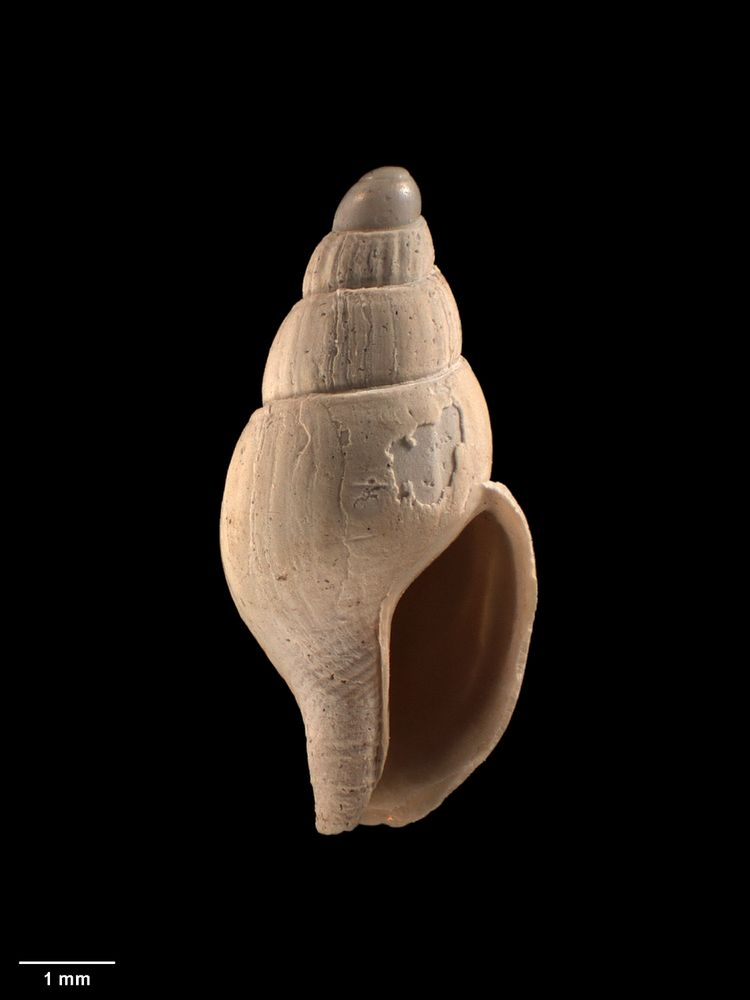
- Shell of Zemitrella circumcincta (specimen at Museum of New Zealand Te Papa Tongarewa)

Scientific classification
- Kingdom: Animalia
- Phylum: Mollusca
- Class: Gastropoda
- Subclass: Caenogastropoda
- Order: Neogastropoda
- Superfamily: Buccinoidea
- Family: Columbellidae
- Genus: Zemitrella
- Species: Z. circumcincta

Binomial name
- Zemitrella circumcincta Dell, 1962

= Zemitrella circumcincta =

Species of sea snail

Zemitrella circumcincta is a species of sea snail, a marine gastropod mollusk in the family Columbellidae, the dove snails.

== Description ==
The length of the shell attains 7.5 mm, its diameter 3.3 mm.

== Distribution ==
This marine species is endemic to New Zealand and occurs off Cook Strait and South Island.
