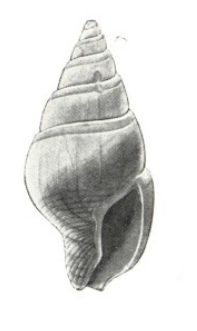
- Shell of Zemitrella subsuturalis (holotype)

Scientific classification
- Kingdom: Animalia
- Phylum: Mollusca
- Class: Gastropoda
- Subclass: Caenogastropoda
- Order: Neogastropoda
- Superfamily: Buccinoidea
- Family: Columbellidae
- Genus: Zemitrella
- Species: †Z. subsuturalis

Binomial name
- †Zemitrella subsuturalis C. A. Fleming, 1943

= Zemitrella subsuturalis =

Species of sea snail

Zemitrella subsuturalis is an extinct species of sea snail, a marine gastropod mollusk in the family Columbellidae, the dove snails.

== Description ==
The shell of Zemitrella mahoenuica can reach a length of 7.5 mm (0.30 in) and a diameter of 3 mm (0.12 in).

The shell is moderate sized for the genus. The spire outline is straight, interrupted somewhat by the slightly incised suture. The protoconch is smooth, shining and papilliform. The nucleus is depressed. The embryonic lip is thickened where it passes abruptly into the post-embryonic shell. The sculpture consists of an ill-defined subsutural groove and many (about 13) fine spiral grooves separating threads on the base and neck. The whorls are otherwise smooth except for faint growth lines. The outer lip is thickened within and has a prominent denticle a third the distance from the posterior notch.

== Distribution ==
Zemitrella subsuturalis is endemic to New Zealand. Fossils have been found in Tertiary strata near the Ongaonga road.
