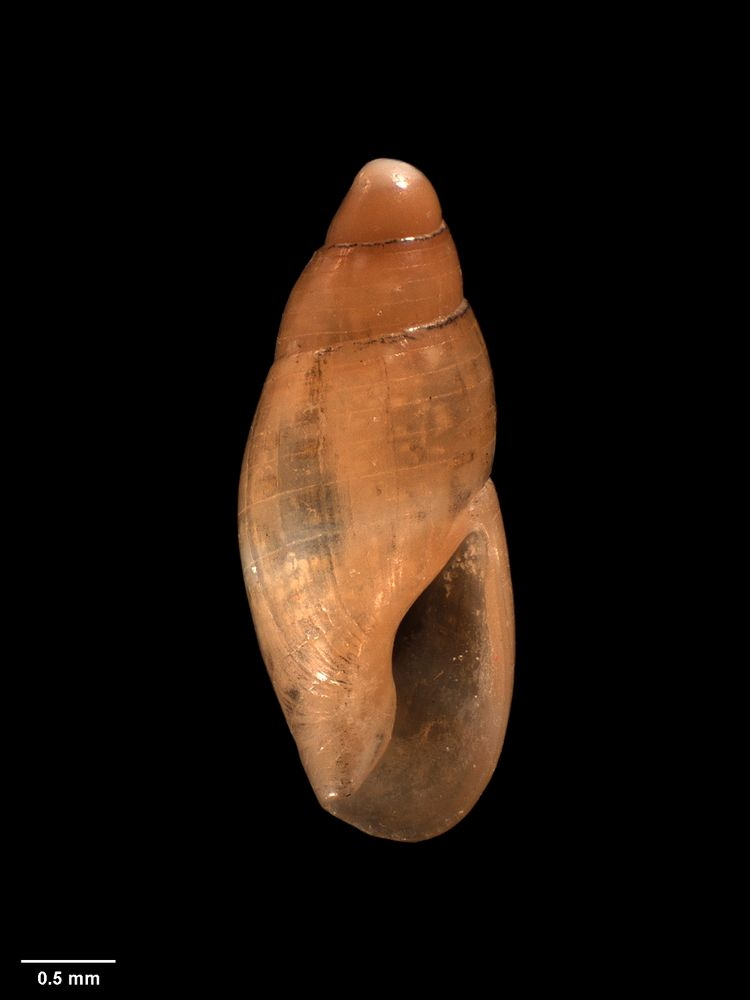
- Shell of Zemitrella whangaroaensis (specimen at the Museum of New Zealand)

Scientific classification
- Kingdom: Animalia
- Phylum: Mollusca
- Class: Gastropoda
- Subclass: Caenogastropoda
- Order: Neogastropoda
- Superfamily: Buccinoidea
- Family: Columbellidae
- Genus: Zemitrella
- Species: Z. whangaroaensis

Binomial name
- Zemitrella whangaroaensis Dell, 1956

= Zemitrella whangaroaensis =

Species of sea snail

Zemitrella whangaroaensis is a species of sea snail, a marine gastropod mollusk in the family Columbellidae, the dove snails.

== Description ==
The length of the shell attains 3.5 mm, its diameter is 1.4 mm.

== Distribution ==
This marine species is endemic to New Zealand and occurs off Northland. Wainui Bay, Whangaroa.
