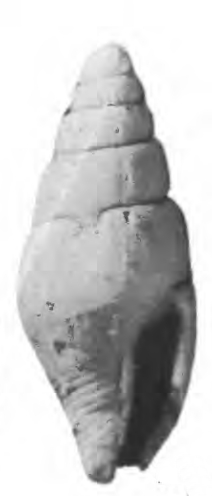
- Shell of Zemitrella bikiniensis (holotype)

Scientific classification
- Kingdom: Animalia
- Phylum: Mollusca
- Class: Gastropoda
- Subclass: Caenogastropoda
- Order: Neogastropoda
- Superfamily: Buccinoidea
- Family: Columbellidae
- Genus: Zemitrella
- Species: †Z. bikiniensis

Binomial name
- †Zemitrella bikiniensis Ladd, 1977

= Zemitrella bikiniensis =

Species of sea snail

Zemitrella bikiniensis is an extinct species of sea snail, a marine gastropod mollusk in the family Columbellidae, the dove snails.

== Description ==
The length of the shell attains 3.7 mm, its diameter 1.4 mm.

(Original description) The minute shell is fusiform and stout. The protoconch consists of about two smooth convex whorls, followed by four gently convex whorls. The suture is deeply impressed, giving the whorls a slight shoulder. The aperture is elongate, slightly sinuous, less than half the length of the shell. The outer lip is thickened, notched posteriorly and dentate within. The inner lip shows a moderately heavy callus. The siphonal canal is short. The shell is smooth except for weak spirals at the base of the body whorl.

== Distribution ==
Fossils of this marine species were found in Late Miocene strata on Bikini, Marshall Islands.
