= Costoanachis beckeri =

Scientific classification
- Kingdom: Animalia
- Phylum: Mollusca
- Class: Gastropoda
- Subclass: Caenogastropoda
- Order: Neogastropoda
- Family: Columbellidae
- Genus: Costoanachis
- Species: C. beckeri

Binomial name
- Costoanachis beckeri (G.B. Sowerby III, 1900)

Species of sea snail

Costoanachis beckeri is a species of sea snail, a marine gastropod mollusc in the family Columbellidae, the dove snails. They are found along the eastern coast of South Africa.

== Description ==
They are benthos and predators.
