= Costoanachis geovanysi =

Scientific classification
- Kingdom: Animalia
- Phylum: Mollusca
- Class: Gastropoda
- Subclass: Caenogastropoda
- Order: Neogastropoda
- Family: Columbellidae
- Genus: Costoanachis
- Species: C. geovanysi

Binomial name
- Costoanachis geovanysi (Espinosa & Ortea, 2014)

Species of sea snail

Costoanachis geovanysi is a species of sea snail, a marine gastropod mollusc in the family Columbellidae, the dove snails.

== Distribution ==
Costoanachis geovanysi can be found in Cuba.
