= Zemitrella spengleri =

Scientific classification
- Kingdom: Animalia
- Phylum: Mollusca
- Class: Gastropoda
- Subclass: Caenogastropoda
- Order: Neogastropoda
- Superfamily: Buccinoidea
- Family: Columbellidae
- Genus: Zemitrella
- Species: Z. spengleri

Binomial name
- Zemitrella spengleri Lussi, 2009

Species of sea snail

Zemitrella spengleri is a species of sea snail, a marine gastropod mollusk in the family Columbellidae, the dove snails.

== Description ==
The length of the shell attains 3.8 mm.

== Distribution ==
This marine species is endemic to South Africa and occurs off Richards Bay, KwaZulu-Natal, South Africa.
