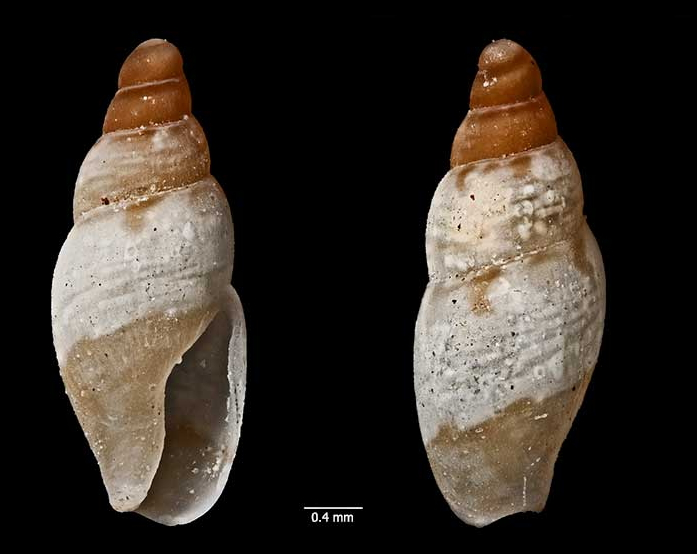
- Shell of Zemitrella laevirostris (specimen in the Museum of New Zealand)

Scientific classification
- Kingdom: Animalia
- Phylum: Mollusca
- Class: Gastropoda
- Subclass: Caenogastropoda
- Order: Neogastropoda
- Superfamily: Buccinoidea
- Family: Columbellidae
- Genus: Zemitrella
- Species: Z. laevirostris

Binomial name
- Zemitrella laevirostris Powell, 1940

= Zemitrella laevirostris =

Species of sea snail

Zemitrella laevirostris is a species of sea snail, a marine gastropod mollusk in the family Columbellidae, the dove snails.

== Description ==
The length of the shell attains 3.3 millimetres (0.13 in), its diameter 1.3 millimetres (0.051 in).

(Original description) The shell is small, elongate, smooth, and polished, lacking any sculpture, even on the neck, which does not show the characteristic spiral grooves. It has four and a half whorls, including a smooth, papillate protoconch of one and a half whorls. The spire is slightly taller than the aperture. The whorls are evenly rounded, and the suture is impressed.

The outer lip is scarcely thickened, but it shows a distinct, shallow subsutural sinus. The coloration is light golden and reddish-brown, set against a white ground. The pattern is variable: in the holotype, the protoconch and the first whorl are light reddish-brown, while the succeeding whorls display a subsutural collar of reddish-brown blotches, an interrupted narrow band of the same colour, and a diffused general pattern of horizontal to slightly oblique streaks of light brown and pale grey. The entire base is almost uniformly light golden-brown.

The aperture is whitish within, except on the lower third, where the basal colour shows through.

== Distribution ==
This marine species is endemic to New Zealand and occurs off Far North and Ranfurly Bank.
