= Zemitrella attenuata =

Scientific classification
- Kingdom: Animalia
- Phylum: Mollusca
- Class: Gastropoda
- Subclass: Caenogastropoda
- Order: Neogastropoda
- Superfamily: Buccinoidea
- Family: Columbellidae
- Genus: Zemitrella
- Species: Z. attenuata

Binomial name
- Zemitrella attenuata Powell, 1940

Species of sea snail

Zemitrella attenuata is a species of sea snail, a marine gastropod mollusk in the family Columbellidae, the dove snails.

== Description ==
The length of the shell attains 4.5 mm, its diameter 1.6 mm.

== Distribution ==
This marine species is endemic to New Zealand and occurs off Three Kings Islands.
