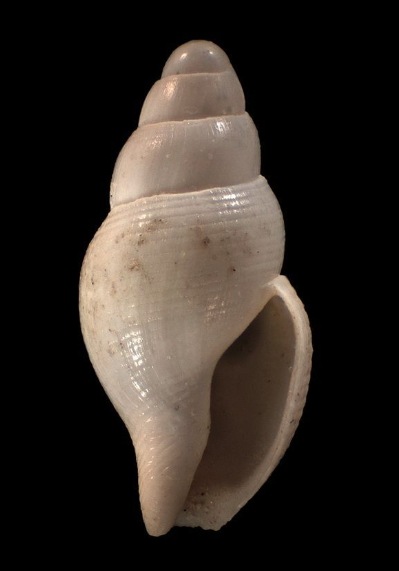
- Shell of Zemitrella websteri (specimen at the Museum of New Zealand Te Papa Tongarewa)

Scientific classification
- Kingdom: Animalia
- Phylum: Mollusca
- Class: Gastropoda
- Subclass: Caenogastropoda
- Order: Neogastropoda
- Superfamily: Buccinoidea
- Family: Columbellidae
- Genus: Zemitrella
- Species: Z. websteri

Binomial name
- Zemitrella websteri (Suter, 1913)

Synonyms
- Columbella compta W. H. Webster, 1906 junior homonym (preoccupied by Columbella compta...); Mitrella compta (W. H. Webster, 1906) junior subjective synonym; Mitrella websteri Suter, 1913 (original combination)

= Zemitrella websteri =

Species of sea snail

Zemitrella websteri is a species of sea snail, a marine gastropod mollusk in the family Columbellidae, the dove snails.

== Description ==
The length of the shell attains 3 mm, its diameter 1 mm.

The very small, thin, white shell is elongated oval and spirally striate. The sculpture consistsof numerous fine and close spiral cords with linear interstices, extending over the whole of the base, and crossed by fine growth lines.

The spire is conical, its height a little less than that of the aperture. The protoconch is papillate and consists of 1½ smooth and polished whorls. The spire contains 4 whorls, regularly increasing and lightly convex. The base is somewhat contracted. The suture is well impressed. The aperture is elongate, narrow, sharply angled above, narrowed below and without a siphonal canal. The base is slightly notched. The outer lip is thin and sharp, straightened above, and smooth within. The columella is vertical and straight. The inner lip is almost obsolete. The spiral sculpture extends to the interior. The operculum is unknown.

== Distribution ==
This marine species is endemic to New Zealand and occurs off Northland off Great Barrier Island.
