= Zemitrella pura =

Scientific classification
- Kingdom: Animalia
- Phylum: Mollusca
- Class: Gastropoda
- Subclass: Caenogastropoda
- Order: Neogastropoda
- Superfamily: Buccinoidea
- Family: Columbellidae
- Genus: Zemitrella
- Species: Z. pura

Binomial name
- Zemitrella pura (E. von Martens, 1904)

Synonyms
- Euthria pura E. von Martens, 1904

Species of sea snail

Zemitrella pura is a species of sea snail, a marine gastropod mollusk in the family Columbellidae, the dove snails.

== Distribution ==
This marine species is endemic to South Africa and occurs off Mossel Bay
