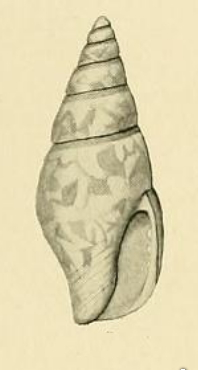
- Shell of Zemitrella pseudomarginata (holotype)

Scientific classification
- Kingdom: Animalia
- Phylum: Mollusca
- Class: Gastropoda
- Subclass: Caenogastropoda
- Order: Neogastropoda
- Superfamily: Buccinoidea
- Family: Columbellidae
- Genus: Zemitrella
- Species: Z. pseudomarginata

Binomial name
- Zemitrella pseudomarginata (Suter, 1908)

Synonyms
- Atilia biconica Suter, 1908; Mitrella pseudomarginata Suter, 1908 (original combination)

= Zemitrella pseudomarginata =

Species of sea snail

Zemitrella pseudomarginata is a species of sea snail, a marine gastropod mollusk in the family Columbellidae, the dove snails.

== Description ==
The length of the shell attains 6.5 mm, its diameter 2.7 mm.

(Original description) The small shell is subulate, smooth, and polished. It is whitish with light-brown zigzag markings and is translucent. The only sculpture consists of a few spiral ridges on the neck of the base. The colour is yellowish white, with fulvous zigzag markings, interrupted on the body whorl by a narrow whitish spiral band below the periphery. The lower part of the base of the shell is white.

The spire is high, acuminate, conic, about 1½ times the height of the aperture. The outlines are straight. The protoconch is papillate and consists of 1½ smooth whorls. The shell contains 6 whorls. These are regularly increasing and flat. The body whorl is lightly convex and is contracted below. The suture is linear and false-margined. The aperture is slightly oblique, narrow, sub-channelled above, but little narrowed below and without a siphonal canal. The outer lip is vertical, rounded below, somewhat thickened and denticulate within. The columella is vertical and slightly bent to the left below. The inner lip is narrow and smooth, very thin on the straight parietal wall. The operculum is unknown.

== Distribution ==
This marine species is endemic to New Zealand and occurs off Northland to Bay of Plenty.
