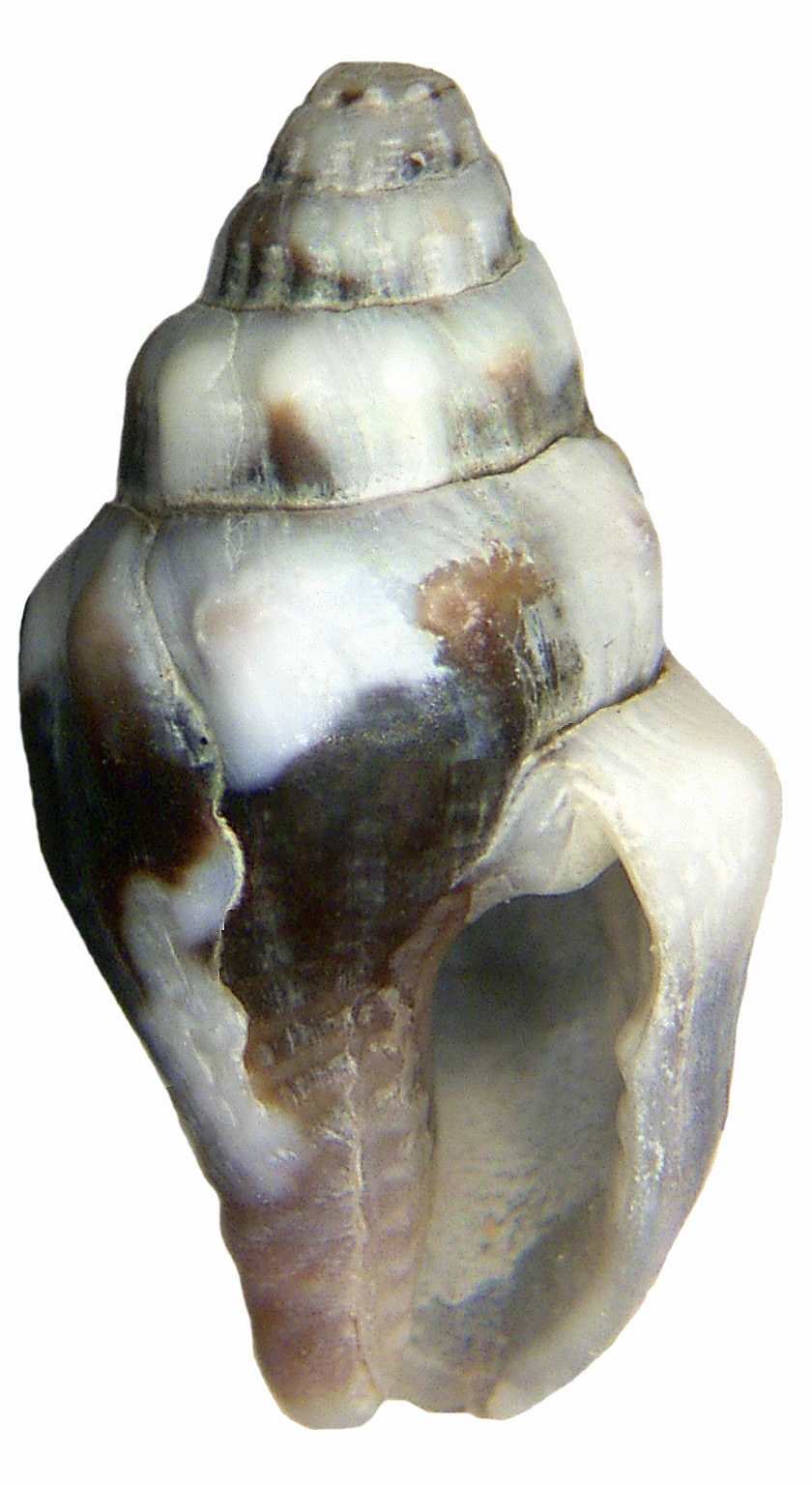
- Shell of Anachis rugosa

Scientific classification
- Kingdom: Animalia
- Phylum: Mollusca
- Class: Gastropoda
- Subclass: Caenogastropoda
- Order: Neogastropoda
- Family: Columbellidae
- Genus: Anachis
- Species: A. rugosa

Binomial name
- Anachis rugosa (G. B. Sowerby I, 1832)

Synonyms
- Columbella bicolor Kiener, 1841; Columbella rugosa G. B. Sowerby I, 1832 (original combination); Costoanachis rugosa (G. B. Sowerby I, 1832)

= Anachis rugosa =

Species of gastropod

Anachis rugosa is a species of sea snail in the family Columbellidae, the dove snails.

== Description ==
(Original description in Latin) The shell is oblong and somewhat humped in the middle. It has a dusky epidermis, and the spire's apex is usually eroded. There are 7 whorls, which are longitudinally ribbed and rugose (wrinkled). The body whorl is spirally ribbed below and longitudinally ribbed above, with all ribs bearing a single tubercle on top. The aperture is somewhat open.

== Distribution ==
This species occurs off California, USA and in the Gulf of California and in the Pacific Ocean off Costa Rica, Panama and Ecuador
