= Anachis bacalladoi =

Scientific classification
- Kingdom: Animalia
- Phylum: Mollusca
- Class: Gastropoda
- Subclass: Caenogastropoda
- Order: Neogastropoda
- Family: Columbellidae
- Genus: Anachis
- Species: A. bacalladoi

Binomial name
- Anachis bacalladoi (Espinosa, Ortea & Moro, 2008)

Synonyms
- Costoanachis bacalladoi Espinosa, Ortea & Moro, 2008 (original combination)

Species of gastropod

Anachis bacalladoi is a species of sea snail in the family Columbellidae, the dove snails.

== Description ==
The length of the shell attains 6.98 mm, its diameter is 2.87 mm.

== Distribution ==
This species occurs off Cuba.
