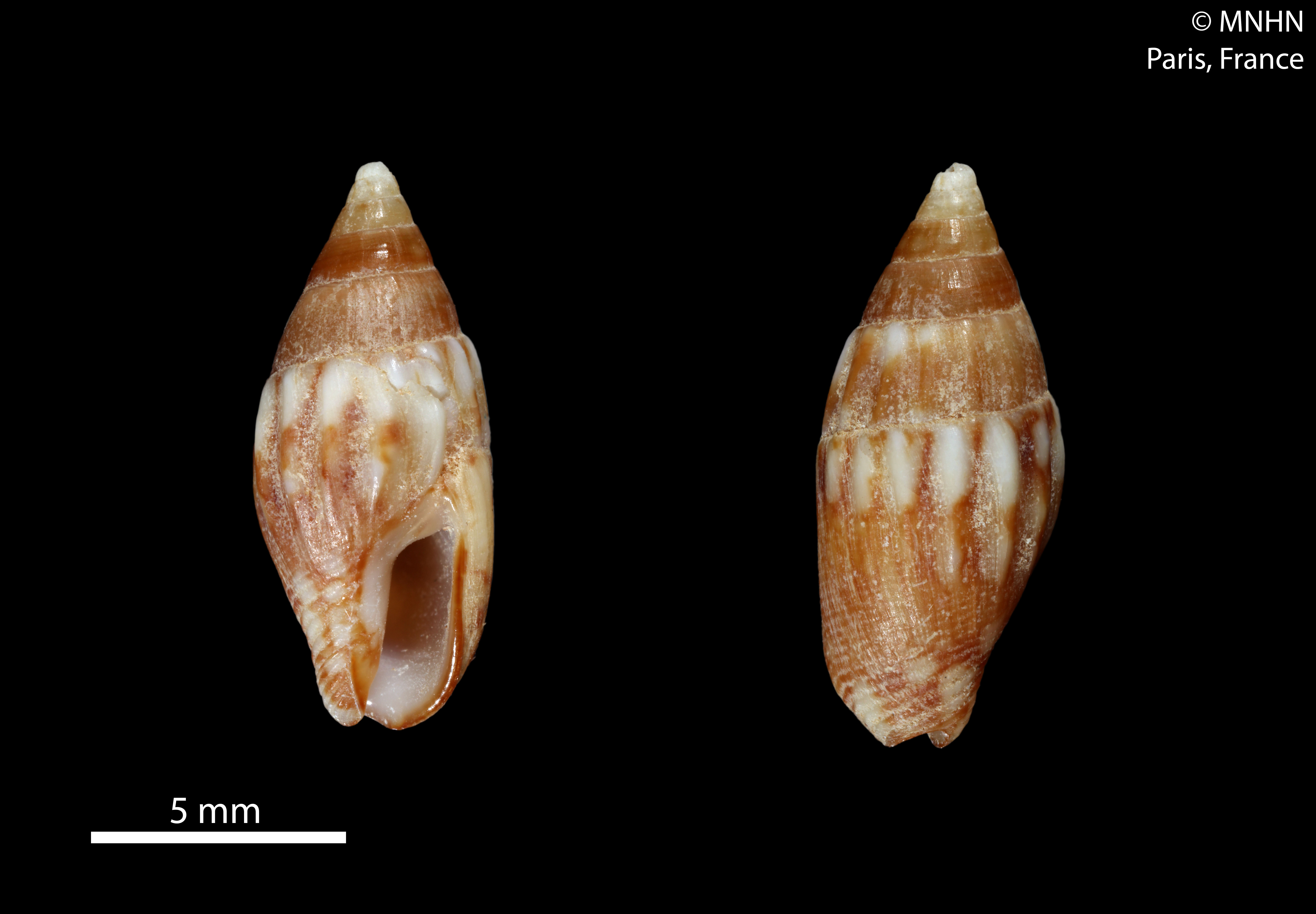
- Shell of Anachis rassieriensis (paratype at MNHN, Paris)

Scientific classification
- Kingdom: Animalia
- Phylum: Mollusca
- Class: Gastropoda
- Subclass: Caenogastropoda
- Order: Neogastropoda
- Family: Columbellidae
- Genus: Anachis
- Species: A. rassierensis

Binomial name
- Anachis rassierensis (Smythe, 1985)

Synonyms
- Costoanachis rassierensis Smythe, 1985 (original combination)

= Anachis rassierensis =

Species of gastropod

Anachis rassierensis is a species of sea snail in the family Columbellidae, the dove snails.

== Description ==
The length of the shell attains 13.1 mm.

== Distribution ==
This species occurs off Oman.
