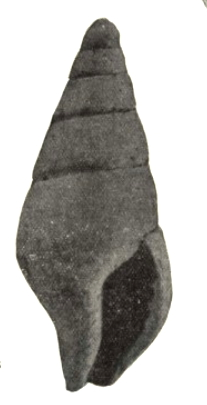
- Shell of Zemitrella haroldi (holotype)

Scientific classification
- Kingdom: Animalia
- Phylum: Mollusca
- Class: Gastropoda
- Subclass: Caenogastropoda
- Order: Neogastropoda
- Superfamily: Buccinoidea
- Family: Columbellidae
- Genus: Zemitrella
- Species: †Z. haroldi

Binomial name
- †Zemitrella haroldi Laws, 1935

= Zemitrella haroldi =

Species of sea snail

Zemitrella haroldi is an extinct species of sea snail, a marine gastropod mollusk in the family Columbellidae, the dove snails.

== Description ==
The shell of Zemitrella haroldi can reach a length of 5.5 mm (0.22 in) and a diameter of 2.5 mm (0.098 in).

The shell is small. The spire is regularly conic, its height about half that of the shell. There are five post-nuclear whorls. The protoconch is rounded and blunt at the summit, convex and smooth below that. The nucleus is small and depressed. The whorls are practically flat. The suture at the periphery is indistinct. The whorls of the spire are entirely devoid of sculpture. The body whorl is flattish above, sharply convex to subangled at the periphery, concave below that, and cut in rapidly to the axis of the shell. There are about seven fine threads at the extreme anterior of the shell, and these trend spirally towards the columella (seen only on immature specimens). The columella is flexed to the left below. The outer lip shows a broad, low, unsculptured varix. Within there are several denticles. The posterior ones are the larger.

== Distribution ==
Zemitrella haroldi is endemic to New Zealand. Fossils have been found in Tertiary strata near Pukeuri.
