= Retizafra dentilabia =

Scientific classification
- Kingdom: Animalia
- Phylum: Mollusca
- Class: Gastropoda
- Subclass: Caenogastropoda
- Order: Neogastropoda
- Family: Columbellidae
- Genus: Retizafra
- Species: R. dentilabia

Binomial name
- Retizafra dentilabia (Lussi, 2009)

Synonyms
- Costoanachis dentilabia Lussi, 2009 (original combination)

Species of gastropod

Retizafra dentilabia is a species of sea snail, a marine gastropod mollusc in the family Columbellidae, the dove snails.
