= Costoanachis indistincta =

Scientific classification
- Kingdom: Animalia
- Phylum: Mollusca
- Class: Gastropoda
- Subclass: Caenogastropoda
- Order: Neogastropoda
- Family: Columbellidae
- Genus: Costoanachis
- Species: C. indistincta

Binomial name
- Costoanachis indistincta (Thiele, 1925)

Species of sea snail

Costoanachis indistincta is a species of sea snail, a marine gastropod mollusc in the family Columbellidae, the dove snails.
