= Zemitrella elongata =

Scientific classification
- Kingdom: Animalia
- Phylum: Mollusca
- Class: Gastropoda
- Subclass: Caenogastropoda
- Order: Neogastropoda
- Superfamily: Buccinoidea
- Family: Columbellidae
- Genus: Zemitrella
- Species: †Z. elongata

Binomial name
- †Zemitrella elongata Beu, 1967

Synonyms
- † Zemitrella benthicola elongata Beu, 1967

Species of sea snail

Zemitrella elongata is an extinct species of sea snail, a marine gastropod mollusk in the family Columbellidae, the dove snails.

== Distribution ==
This marine species is endemic to New Zealand. Fossils were found in Pliocene strata in Palliser Bay.
