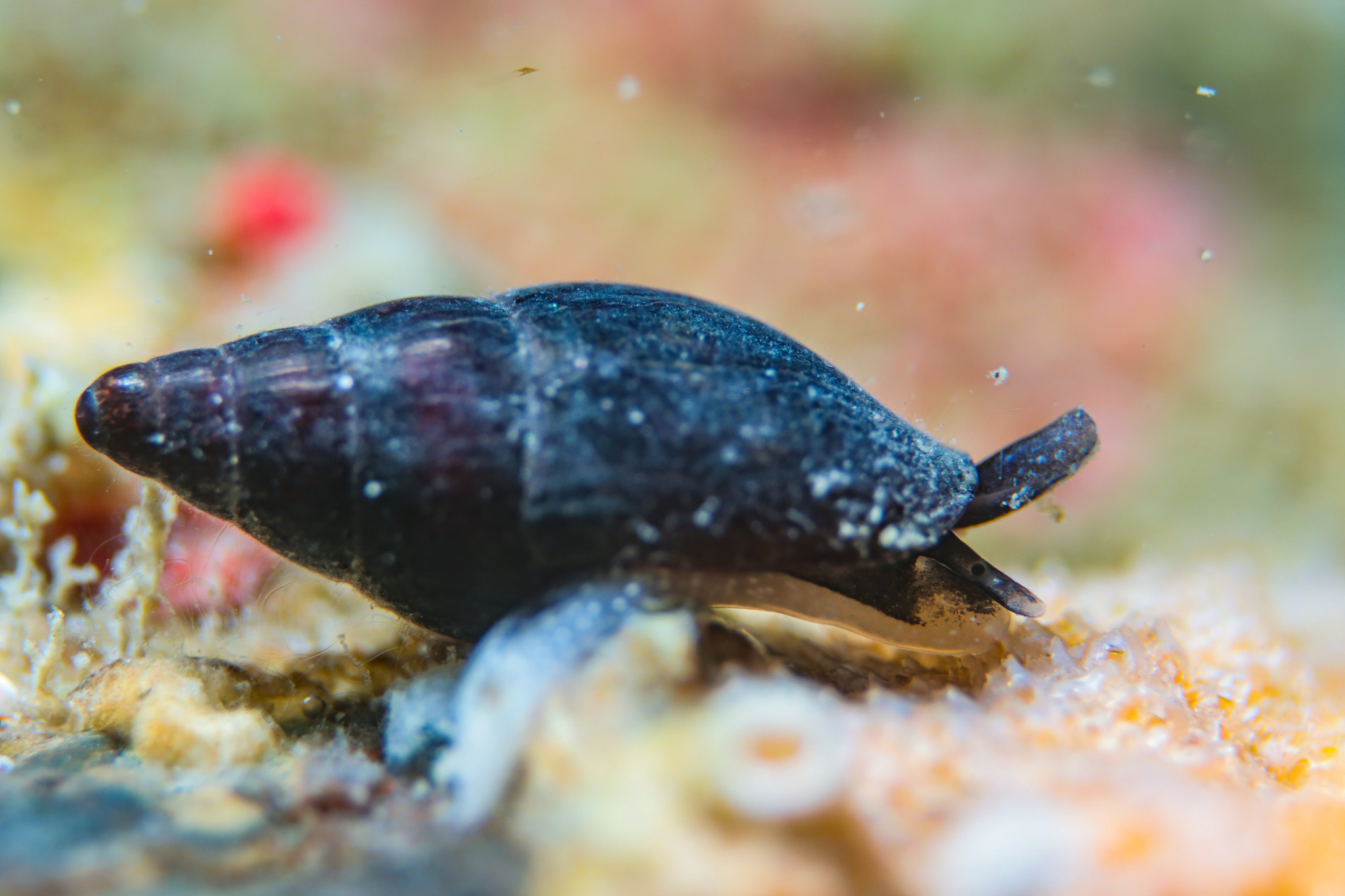
- Live animal seen in Wellington Harbour, New Zealand

Scientific classification
- Kingdom: Animalia
- Phylum: Mollusca
- Class: Gastropoda
- Subclass: Caenogastropoda
- Order: Neogastropoda
- Superfamily: Buccinoidea
- Family: Columbellidae
- Genus: Zemitrella
- Species: Z. choava

Binomial name
- Zemitrella choava (Reeve, 1859)

Synonyms
- Columbella choava Reeve, 1859 (original combination); Pyrene flexuosus F. W. Hutton, 1878 (junior subjective synonym)

= Zemitrella choava =

Species of sea snail

Zemitrella choava is a species of sea snail, a marine gastropod mollusk in the family Columbellidae, the dove snails.

== Description ==
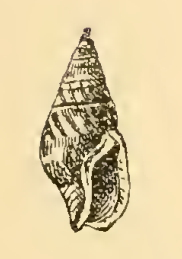
Drawing of a shell of Zemitrella choava

The length of the shell attains 6.5 mm, its diameter 3 mm.

The ovate shell is smooth, yellowish, freckled or longitudinally waved with chestnut. The outer lip is slightly thickened in the middle and dentate within.

== Distribution ==
This marine species is endemic to New Zealand and occurs off North Island, South Island and Stewart Island. Also Kermadec Islands.
