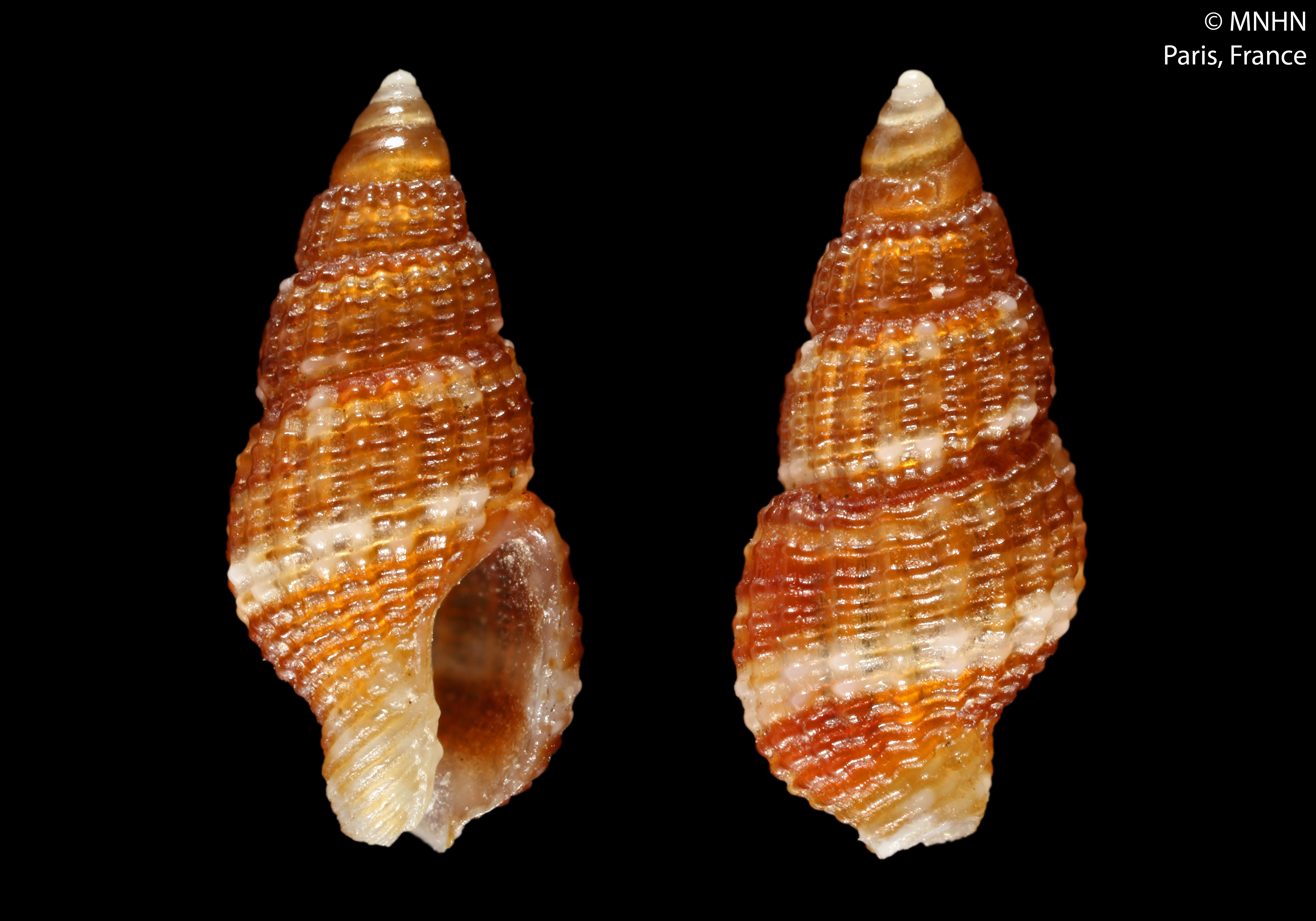
- Shell of Zafrona isomella

Scientific classification
- Kingdom: Animalia
- Phylum: Mollusca
- Class: Gastropoda
- Subclass: Caenogastropoda
- Order: Neogastropoda
- Superfamily: Buccinoidea
- Family: Columbellidae
- Genus: Zafrona; Iredale, 1916

Type species
- Columbella isomella Duclos, 1840

Synonyms
- Anachis (Zafrona) Iredale, 1916

= Zafrona =

Genus of gastropods

Zafrona is a genus of sea snails, marine gastropod mollusks in the family Columbellidae, the dove snails.

== Description ==
(Original description) The species vary in size, sculpture, and shape. Thus some are very small, 2 mm., to comparatively large, 5 mm., from slender to obese, and from closely sculptured to almost smooth.

== Species ==
Species within the genus Zafrona include:

- † Zafrona arpula (Michelotti, 1840)
- Zafrona azteci K. Monsecour & D. Monsecour, 2016
- Zafrona dentata Perugia, 2023
- Zafrona fatuhiva K. Monsecour & D. Monsecour, 2018
- Zafrona isomella (Duclos, 1840)
- Zafrona kilburni Bozzetti, 2009
- Zafrona lightfooti (Smith, 1901)
- Zafrona macronata Simone, 2009
- Zafrona pleuriferoides K. Monsecour & D. Monsecour, 2018
- † Zafrona recticostata (Sacco, 1890)
- Zafrona samadiae K. Monsecour & D. Monsecour, 2016
- Zafrona somalica Bozzetti, 2007
- † Zafrona sphaerocorrugata Harzhauser & Landau, 2021
- Zafrona striatula (Dunker, 1871)
- Zafrona subfelina (Hervier, 1900)
- Zafrona ursula (Thiele, 1925)

Species brought into synonymy

- Zafrona belkisae Espinosa, Ortea, Fernandez-Garcés & Moro, 2007: synonym of Falsuszafrona belkisae (Espinosa & Ortea, 2007)
- Zafrona consobrinella Rehder, 1980: synonym of Zafrona striatula (Dunker, 1871)
- Zafrona decussata Lussi, 2002 synonym of Retizafra decussata (Lussi, 2002)
- Zafrona dicomata (Dall, 1889): synonym of Falsuszafrona dicomata (Dall, 1889)
- Zafrona diversa Espinosa, Ortea & Fernadez-Garcés, 2007: synonym of Falsuszafrona diversa (Espinosa, Ortea & Fernández-Garcés, 2007) (original combination)
- Zafrona idalina (Duclos, 1840): synonym of Falsuszafrona idalina (Duclos, 1840)
- Zafrona incerta (Stearns, 1892): synonym of Falsuszafrona incerta (Stearns, 1892)
- Zafrona lindae Petuch, 1992: synonym of Falsuszafrona lindae (Petuch, 1992) (original combination)
- Zafrona pulchella (Blainville, 1829): synonym of Falsuszafrona pulchella (Blainville, 1829)
- Zafrona sunderlandi Petuch, 1987: synonym of Falsuszafrona sunderlandi (Petuch, 1987) (original combination)
- Zafrona taylorae Petuch, 1987: synonym of Falsuszafrona taylorae (Petuch, 1987) (original combination)
- Zafrona tortugana Garcia, 2015: synonym of Falsuszafrona tortugana (E. F. García, 2015) (original combination)
- Zafrona trifilosa (E.A. Smith, 1882): synonym of Smithena trifilosa (E. A. Smith, 1882) (unaccepted > superseded combination)
