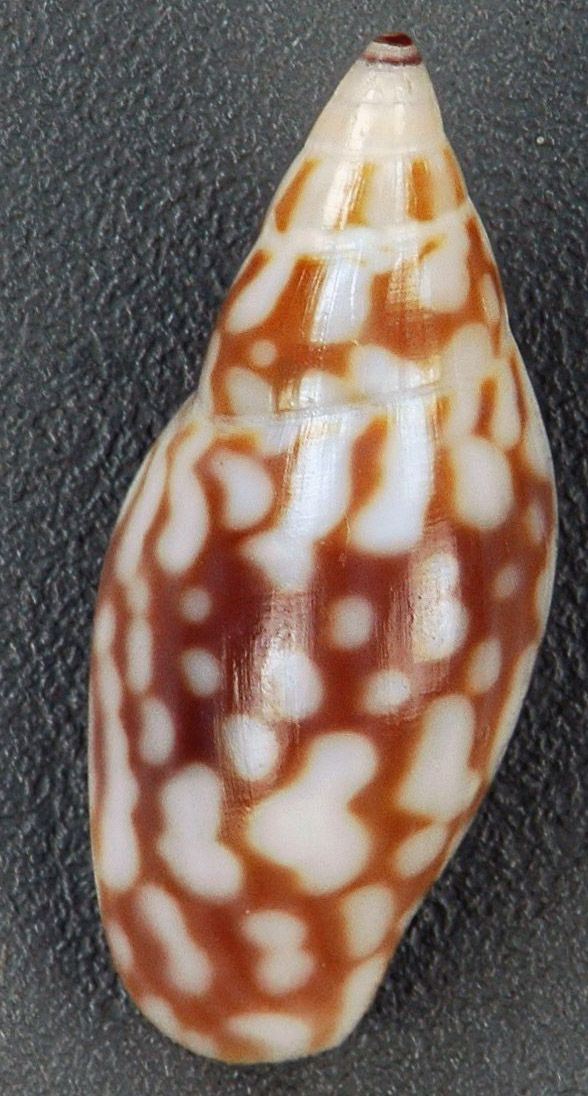
- Nitidella nitida shell

Scientific classification
- Kingdom: Animalia
- Phylum: Mollusca
- Class: Gastropoda
- Subclass: Caenogastropoda
- Order: Neogastropoda
- Superfamily: Buccinoidea
- Family: Columbellidae
- Genus: Nitidella; Swainson, 1840

Type species
- Tubercliopsis capricornia Laseron, 1956

Synonyms
- Anachis (Nitidella) Swainson, 1840; Columbella (Nitidella) Swainson, 1840

= Nitidella =

Genus of gastropods

Nitidella is a genus of sea snails, marine gastropod mollusks in the family Columbellidae, the dove snails.

== Species ==
Species within the genus Nitidella include:

- Nitidella nitida (Lamarck, 1822)

Synonyms

- Nitidella carinata (Hinds, 1844): synonym of Alia carinata (Hinds, 1844)
- Nitidella cribraria (Lamarck, 1822): synonym of Mitrella ocellata (Gmelin, 1791)
- Nitidella densilineata Carpenter, 1864: synonym of Mitrella densilineata (Carpenter, 1864) (original combination)
- Nitidella elegans Dall, 1871: synonym of Mitrella elegans (Dall, 1871) (original combination)
- Nitidella filosa Stearns, 1873: synonym of Aesopus stearnsii (Tryon, 1883) (invalid: junior secondary homonym of Aesopus filosus Angas, 1867; C. strearnsii is a replacement name)
- Nitidella gouldii Carpenter, 1857: synonym of Alia carinata (Hinds, 1844) (original combination)
- Nitidella guttata (G. B. Sowerby I, 1832): synonym of Mitrella guttata (G. B. Sowerby I, 1832) (incorrect generic combination)
- Nitidella hendersoni Dall, 1908: synonym of Rhombinella laevigata (Linnaeus, 1758) (junior synonym)
- Nitidella incerta Stearns, 1892: synonym of Falsuszafrona incerta (Stearns, 1892) (original combination)
- Nitidella laevigata (Linnaeus, 1758): synonym of Rhombinella laevigata (Linnaeus, 1758)
- Nitidella lutulenta Dall, 1919: synonym of Mitrella gausapata (A. Gould, 1850)
- Nitidella marmorata Swainson, 1840: synonym of Nitidella nitida (Lamarck, 1822)
- Nitidella millepunctata Carpenter, 1864: synonym of Mitrella millepunctata (Carpenter, 1864) (original combination)
- Nitidella ocellina F. Nordsieck, 1975: synonym of Mitrella broderipii (G. B. Sowerby I, 1844)
