= Thorlaksonius platypus =

Scientific classification
- Kingdom: Animalia
- Phylum: Arthropoda
- Class: Malacostraca
- Order: Amphipoda
- Family: Pleustidae
- Genus: Thorlaksonius
- Species: T. platypus

Binomial name
- Thorlaksonius platypus (Barnard & Given, 1960)

Synonyms
- Pleustes platypa Barnard & Given, 1960

Species of arthropod

Thorlaksonius platypus is a species of Pleustid amphipod native to southern California. It is thought to be an example of mimicry, as it resembles the gastropod Alia carinata. This was the first example of an arthropod mimicking a gastropod ever described.

== Taxonomy ==
Thorlaksonius platypus was originally described in 1960 as Pleustes platypa. However, in 1994, it was redescribed under the new genus Thorlaksonius.

== Description ==
Thorlaksonius platypus ranges in size from 3.5–10 mm (0.14–0.39 in). It has a variable color which closely resembles the variation of Alia carinata. The color of only a single specimen has been described. This individual displayed a brown and grey body with a singular yellow band across its dorsal plates, called the pereon. Its walking legs were light in color with some mottling, again resembling A. carinata.

The way in which the amphipod holds its body also mimics the distinct shell of A. carinata. Its abdomen (pleon) is tucked underneath its body and is partially hidden by long protrusions of the pereon. The end of its body sticks up in the water at an angle. It walks slowly when in this position, but is capable of swimming.

This species is quite similar to Thorlaksonius depressus and Thorlaksonius grandirostris. It may be distinguished by the shape of its dorsal pereon and pleon segments, which are sharp in T. platypus, and round in T. depressus. Only the final (7th) segment of the pereon and pleon segments 1 and 2 have these tooth-like projections. The only other distinguishing characteristic is a broad rostrum that is longer than the head.

== Distribution and habitat ==
Thorlaksonius platypus occurrences have been recorded from San Diego in the south to Gaviota State Park in the north. Its range may extend up to Point Conception, which separates it from Thorlaksonius depressus (except at La Jolla Cove, where the two species are sympatric and likely interbreed). It is also found off the islands of Catalina and Santa Barbara.

This species is typically found living on algae, including Macrocystis and coralline algae, but may also be found on other substrates.
