= Buccinum pulchellum =

Scientific classification
- Kingdom: Animalia
- Phylum: Mollusca
- Class: Gastropoda
- Subclass: Caenogastropoda
- Order: Neogastropoda
- Family: Buccinidae
- Genus: Buccinum
- Species: B. pulchellum

Binomial name
- Buccinum pulchellum Sars G.O., 1878

Species of gastropod

Buccinum pulchellum is a species of sea snail, a marine gastropod mollusk in the family Buccinidae, the true whelks.

Not to be confounded with:

- Buccinum pulchellum Blainville, 1829: synonym of Zafrona pulchella (Blainville, 1829)
- Buccinum pulchellum Calcara, 1845: synonym of Mazatlania cosentini (Philippi, 1836)
- Buccinum pulchellum C. B. Adams, 1851: synonym of Decipifus sixaolus Olsson & McGinty, 1958

== Distribution ==
This marine species occurs in European waters.
