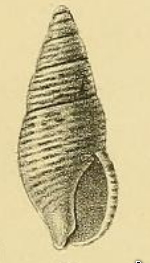
- Shell of Zafrona lightfooti (holotype)

Scientific classification
- Kingdom: Animalia
- Phylum: Mollusca
- Class: Gastropoda
- Subclass: Caenogastropoda
- Order: Neogastropoda
- Superfamily: Buccinoidea
- Family: Columbellidae
- Genus: Zafrona
- Species: Z. lightfooti

Binomial name
- Zafrona lightfooti (E. A. Smith, 1901)

Synonyms
- Anachis lightfooti (E. A. Smith, 1901); Columbella (Astyris) lightfooti E. A. Smith, 1901 (basionym); Columbella lightfooti E. A. Smith, 1901 (original combination); Columbella lightfooti var. assimilans W. H. Turton, 1932 (junior synonym); Pyrene lightfooti (E. A. Smith, 1901)

= Zafrona lightfooti =

Species of gastropod

Zafrona lightfooti is a species of sea snail, a marine gastropod mollusk in the family Columbellidae, the dove snails.

== Description ==
The length of the shell attains 6 mm, its diameter 2.5 mm.

(Original description) This small species has an ovate-fusiform shape. It contains five whorls. It is well characterized by the style of coloration and the transverse sulcate sculpture. The interrupted transverse lines fall upon the slightly raised ridges between the sulci, and the interruptions are so regular that the shell presents a series of short lines one under another. The grooving upon the anterior end of the body whorl is finer than that above.

== Distribution ==
This marine species occurs off South Africa
