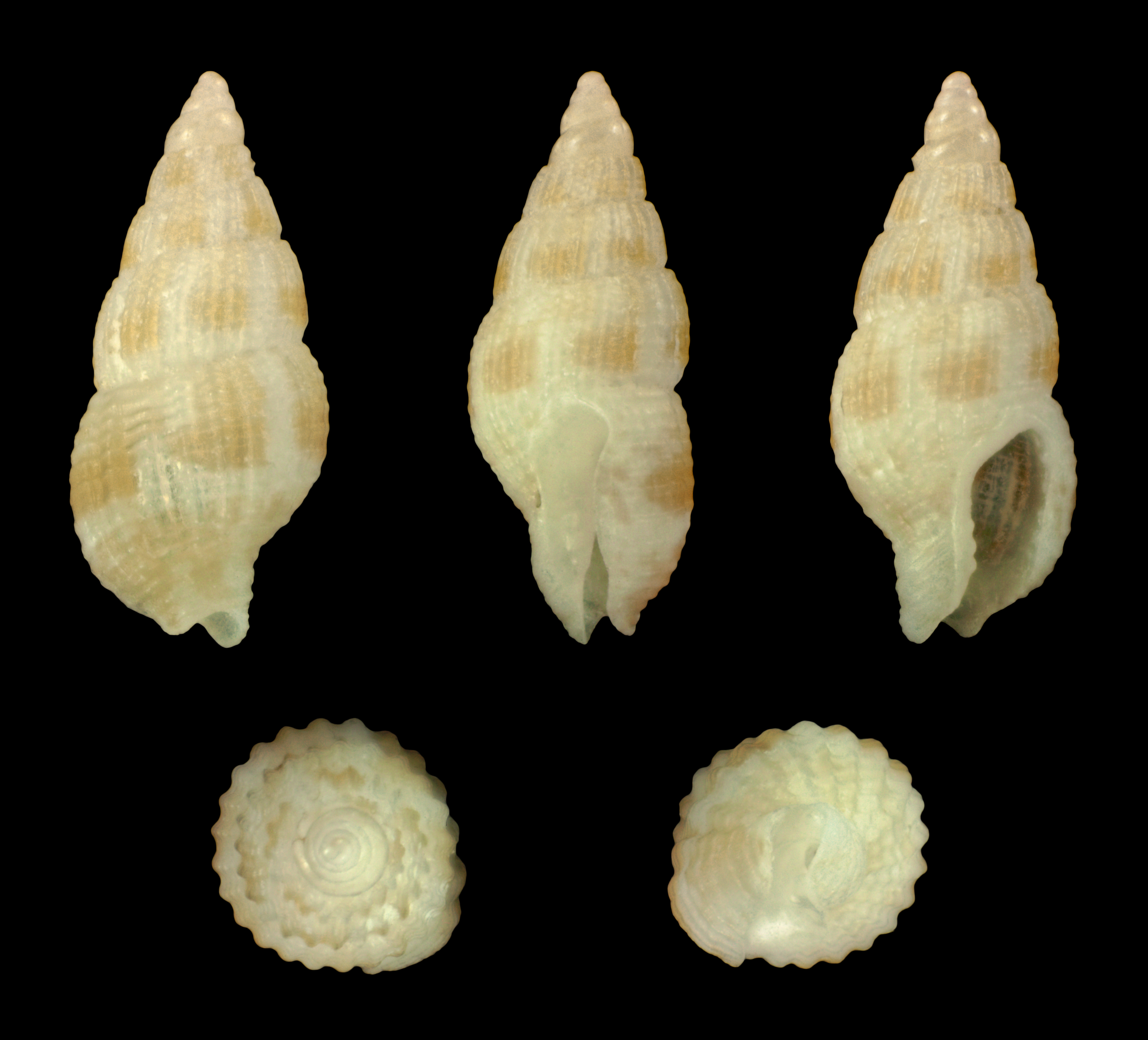
- Shell of Zafrona isomella

Scientific classification
- Kingdom: Animalia
- Phylum: Mollusca
- Class: Gastropoda
- Subclass: Caenogastropoda
- Order: Neogastropoda
- Superfamily: Buccinoidea
- Family: Columbellidae
- Genus: Zafrona
- Species: Z. isomella

Binomial name
- Zafrona isomella (Duclos, 1840)

Synonyms
- Anachis (Zafrona) isomella (Duclos, 1840); Anachis retiaria (Tomlin, 1931); Caducifer nebulosus (A. Gould, 1860) (junior subjective synonym); Colombella isomella Duclos, 1840; Columbella (Anachis) nebulosa A. Gould, 1860 (superseded combination); Columbella isomella Duclos, 1840 (original combination); Columbella isomella var. notata Hervier, 1900; Columbella isomella var. transversa Hervier, 1900; Columbella nebulosa A. Gould, 1860 (junior subjective synonym); Columbella striatula var. immaculata Hervier, 1900; Columbella striatula var. lineolata Hervier, 1900; Columbella striatula var. rubicunda Hervier, 1900; Columbella striatula var. subcarnea Hervier, 1900; Columbella striatula var. sulphurea Hervier, 1900; Pleurotoma (Defrancia) grisea E. A. Smith, 1884; Pleurotoma grisea E. A. Smith, 1884

= Zafrona isomella =

Species of gastropod

Zafrona isomella is a species of sea snail, a marine gastropod mollusk in the family Columbellidae, the dove snails.

== Description ==
The length of the shell attains 5 mm, its diameter 1.5 mm.

(Described as Pleurotoma (Defrancia) grisea) The very small shell is subfusiformly ovate. It is grey or dirty white, sometimes spotted with brown below the suture, or exhibiting one or two pale or whitish spiral lines.

The shell contains eight whorls. The first 4½ are white, smooth, glossy, convex and non -perpendicular with the axis of the shell. The rest are granosely finely costate and transversely lirate and slightly convex at the sides. There are about eighteen ribs on a whorl, hardly as broad as the interstices. The lirae are finer than the ribs, six on the upper whorls and about twenty on the body whorl. The aperture is small, narrow and terminates anteriorly in a short, oblique, recurved siphonal canal. The columella is covered with a callus bearing two small tubercles just below the middle. The outer lip is externally thickened with a broadish varix, faintly sinuated above near the suture, armed within with seven strong lirae.

== Distribution ==
This marine species occurs off Réunion, the Philippines,
