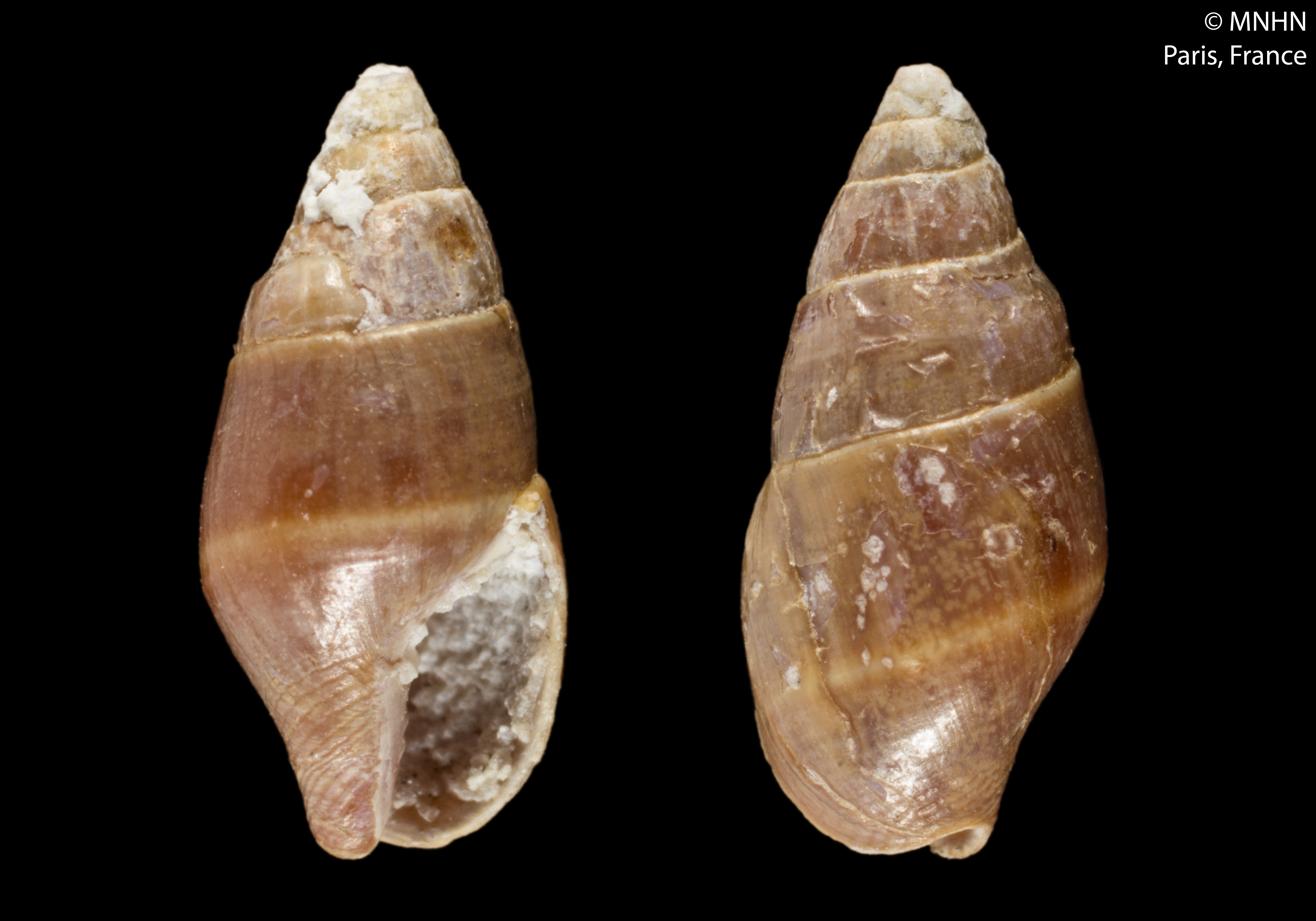
- Shell of Alia unifasciata (syntype at MNHN, Paris)

Scientific classification
- Kingdom: Animalia
- Phylum: Mollusca
- Class: Gastropoda
- Subclass: Caenogastropoda
- Order: Neogastropoda
- Superfamily: Buccinoidea
- Family: Columbellidae
- Genus: Alia; H. Adams & A. Adams, 1853

Type species
- Columbella carinata Hinds, 1844

Species
- See text

Synonyms
- Columbella (Alia) H. Adams & A. Adams, 1853 (original rank)

= Alia (gastropod) =

Genus of gastropods

Alia is a genus of small sea snails, marine gastropod mollusks in the family Columbellidae, the dove snails.

== Species ==
According to the World Register of Marine Species (WoRMS), the following species with a valid name are included within the genus Alia :

- Alia carinata (Hinds, 1844)
- Alia unicolor (G. B. Sowerby I, 1832)
- Alia unifasciata (G.B. Sowerby, 1832)

Species brought into synonymy

- Alia aurantiaca (Dall, 1871): synonym of Mitrella aurantiaca (Dall, 1871)
- Alia callimorpha] Dall, 1919: synonym of Alia carinata (Hinds, 1844)
- Alia casciana Dall, 1919: synonym of Alia gausapata (Gould, 1850)
- Alia gausapata (Gould, 1850): synonym of Mitrella gausapata (Gould, 1850)
- Alia gouldi (Carpenter, 1856): synonym of Alia carinata (Hinds, 1844)
- Alia permodesta (Dall, 1890): synonym of Astyris permodesta (Dall, 1890)
- Alia tuberosa (Carpenter, 1865): synonym of Mitrella tuberosa (Carpenter, 1865)
- Alia xenia Dall, 1919: synonym of Mitrella xenia (Dall, 1919)
