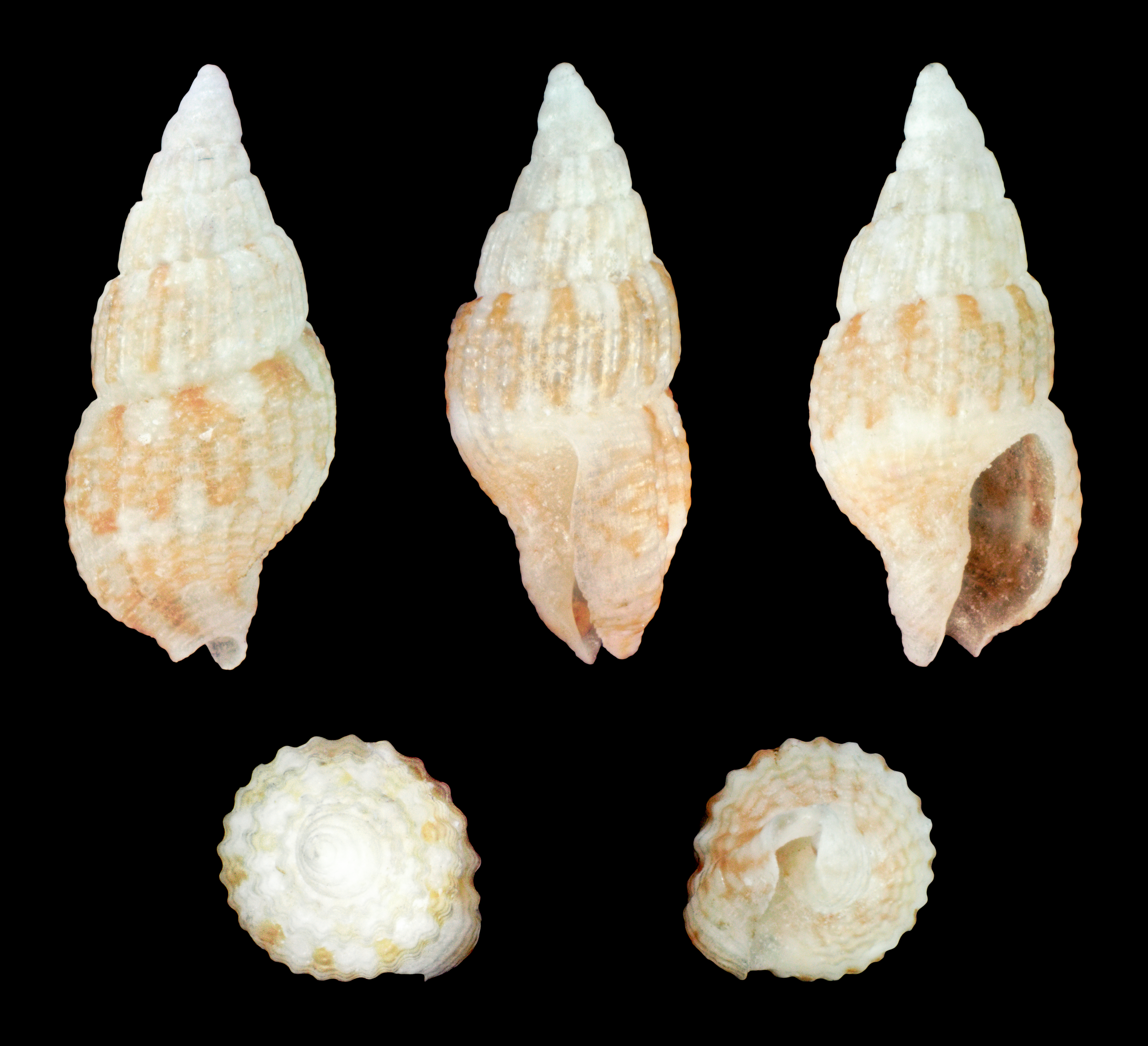
- Shell of Zafrona striatula

Scientific classification
- Kingdom: Animalia
- Phylum: Mollusca
- Class: Gastropoda
- Subclass: Caenogastropoda
- Order: Neogastropoda
- Superfamily: Buccinoidea
- Family: Columbellidae
- Genus: Zafrona
- Species: Z. striatula

Binomial name
- Zafrona striatula (Dunker, 1871)

Synonyms
- Amycla striatula Dunker, 1871 (original combination); Columbella filamentosa Tryon, 1883; Columbella lifouana Hervier, 1900; Columbella lifouana var. intermissa Hervier, 1900; Columbella lifouana var. rufolineata Hervier, 1900; Columbella striatula (Dunker, 1871) ((incorrect generic combination)); Zafrona consobrinella Rehder, 1980

= Zafrona striatula =

Species of gastropod

Zafrona striatula is a species of sea snail, a marine gastropod mollusk in the family Columbellidae, the dove snails.

== Description ==
The length of the shell attains 6 mm.

(Described as Columbella filamentosa) The shell is slightly but closely longitudinally ribbed, with revolving striae at the base. The outer lip is varicosely thickened, smooth within, sinuate behind, terminating in a short but distinctly constricted siphonal canal. The shell is yellowish brown, with numerous equidistant narrow revolving chestnut lines.

== Distribution ==
This marine species occurs off French Polynesia, Hawaii, Easter Island, Cook Islands.
