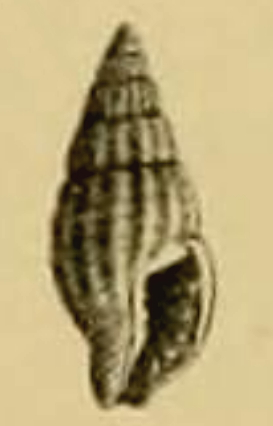
- Shell of Zafrona recticostata (holotype)

Scientific classification
- Kingdom: Animalia
- Phylum: Mollusca
- Class: Gastropoda
- Subclass: Caenogastropoda
- Order: Neogastropoda
- Superfamily: Buccinoidea
- Family: Columbellidae
- Genus: Zafrona
- Species: †Z. recticostata

Binomial name
- †Zafrona recticostata (Sacco, 1890)

Synonyms
- † Columbella (Anachis) recticostata Sacco, 1890

= Zafrona recticostata =

Species of gastropod

Zafrona recticostata is an extinct species of sea snail, a marine gastropod mollusk in the family Columbellidae, the dove snails.

== Description ==
The length of the shell attains 5.5 mm, its diameter 3 mm.

== Distribution ==
Fossils of this marine species were found in Miocene strata in Northern Italy.
