= Zafrona arpula =

Scientific classification
- Kingdom: Animalia
- Phylum: Mollusca
- Class: Gastropoda
- Subclass: Caenogastropoda
- Order: Neogastropoda
- Superfamily: Buccinoidea
- Family: Columbellidae
- Genus: Zafrona
- Species: †Z. arpula

Binomial name
- †Zafrona arpula (Michelotti, 1840)

Synonyms
- † Buccinum arpula Michelotti, 1840

Species of gastropod

Zafrona arpula is a species of sea snail, a marine gastropod mollusk in the family Columbellidae, the dove snails.

== Distribution ==
Fossils of this marine species were found in Miocene strata in Northern Italy.
