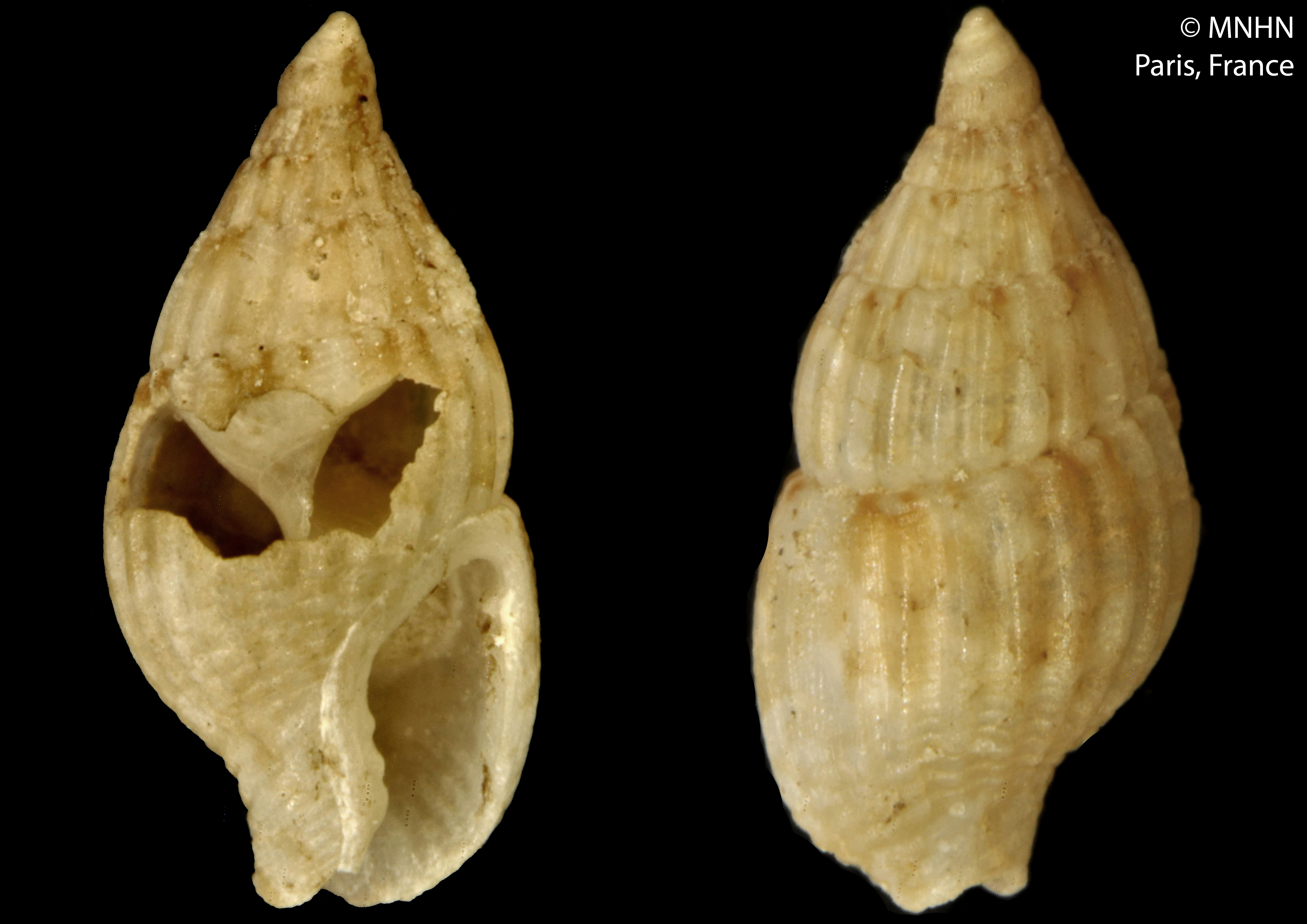
- Shell of Zafrona pleuriferoides (holotype at MNHN, Paris)

Scientific classification
- Kingdom: Animalia
- Phylum: Mollusca
- Class: Gastropoda
- Subclass: Caenogastropoda
- Order: Neogastropoda
- Superfamily: Buccinoidea
- Family: Columbellidae
- Genus: Zafrona
- Species: Z. pleuriferoides

Binomial name
- Zafrona pleuriferoides K. Monsecour & D. Monsecour, 2016

= Zafrona pleuriferoides =

Species of gastropod

Zafrona pleuriferoides is a species of sea snail, a marine gastropod mollusk in the family Columbellidae, the dove snails.

== Distribution ==
This deep-water marine species occurs off the Society Islands.
