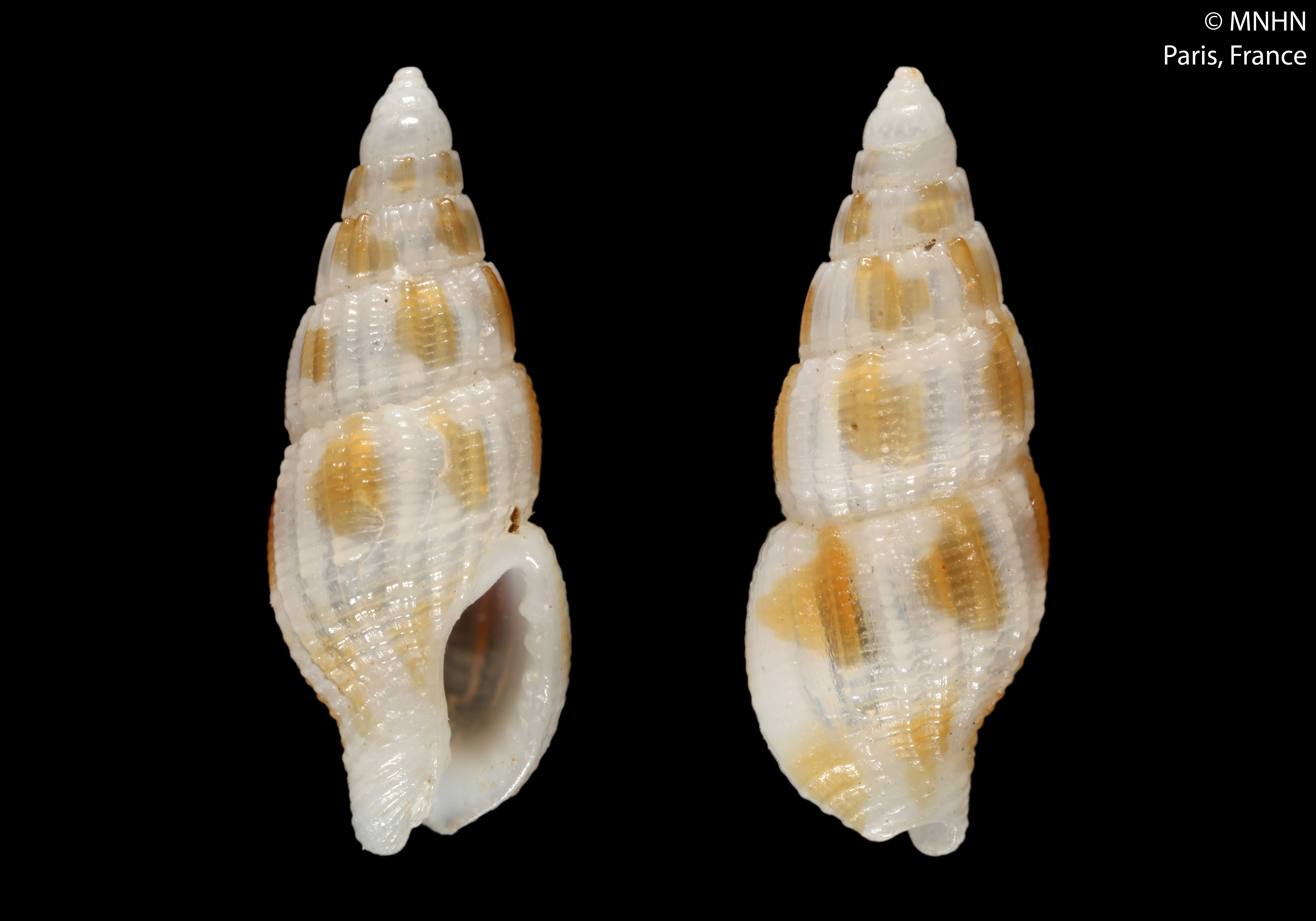
- Shell of Zafrona subfelina (syntype at MNHN, Paris)

Scientific classification
- Kingdom: Animalia
- Phylum: Mollusca
- Class: Gastropoda
- Subclass: Caenogastropoda
- Order: Neogastropoda
- Superfamily: Buccinoidea
- Family: Columbellidae
- Genus: Zafrona
- Species: Z. subfelina

Binomial name
- Zafrona subfelina (Hervier, 1900)

Synonyms
- Columbella isomella var. subfelina Hervier, 1900 (original combination)

= Zafrona subfelina =

Species of gastropod

Zafrona subfelina is a species of sea snail, a marine gastropod mollusk in the family Columbellidae, the dove snails.

== Description ==
The length of the shell attains 6-7 mm, its diameter is 2.5 to 3 mm.

== Distribution ==
This marine species occurs off Lifou, French Polynesia.
