= Zafrona sphaerocorrugata =

Scientific classification
- Kingdom: Animalia
- Phylum: Mollusca
- Class: Gastropoda
- Subclass: Caenogastropoda
- Order: Neogastropoda
- Superfamily: Buccinoidea
- Family: Columbellidae
- Genus: Zafrona
- Species: †Z. sphaerocorrugata

Binomial name
- †Zafrona sphaerocorrugata Harzhauser & Landau, 2021

Species of gastropod

Zafrona sphaerocorrugata is an extinct species of sea snail, a marine gastropod mollusk in the family Columbellidae, the dove snails.

== Distribution ==
Fossils of this marine species were found in Miocene strata in Northern Italy.
