= Zafrona macronata =

Scientific classification
- Kingdom: Animalia
- Phylum: Mollusca
- Class: Gastropoda
- Subclass: Caenogastropoda
- Order: Neogastropoda
- Superfamily: Buccinoidea
- Family: Columbellidae
- Genus: Zafrona
- Species: Z. macronata

Binomial name
- Zafrona macronata (E. A. Smith, 1884)Simone, 2009

Species of gastropod

Zafrona macronata is a species of sea snail, a marine gastropod mollusk in the family Columbellidae, the dove snails.

== Description ==
The length of the shell attains 2.6 mm, its diameter 1.1 mm.

== Distribution ==
This species occurs in the Atlantic Ocean off Brazil.
