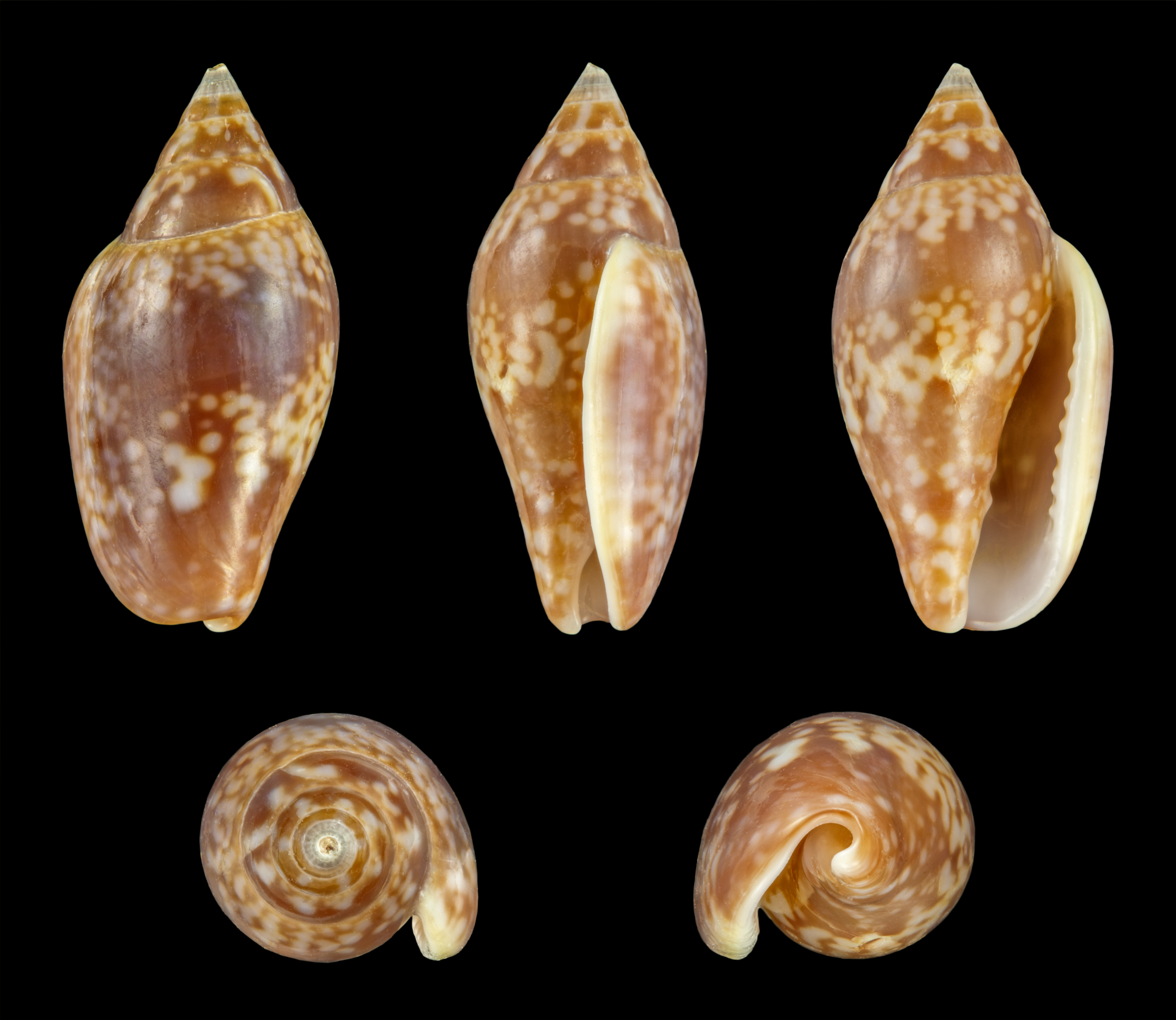
- Nitidella nitida shell

Scientific classification
- Kingdom: Animalia
- Phylum: Mollusca
- Class: Gastropoda
- Subclass: Caenogastropoda
- Order: Neogastropoda
- Family: Columbellidae
- Genus: Nitidella
- Species: N. nitida

Binomial name
- Nitidella nitida (Lamarck, 1822)

Synonyms
- Buccinum nitidulum Linnaeus, 1758; Columbella nitida Lamarck, 1822 (basionym); Columbella nitidula G.B. Sowerby, 1822; Columbella swainsoni Mörch, 1859; Columbella tringa (Schroeter, 1783); Nitidella marmorata Swainson, 1840; Nitidella nitidula Sowerby, G.B. I, 1822; Voluta gracilis Dillwyn, 1823; Voluta tringa Schroeter, 1783

= Nitidella nitida =

Species of gastropod

Nitidella nitida, common name: the glossy dove shell, is a species of sea snail, a marine gastropod mollusk in the family Columbellidae, the dove snails.

== Description ==
The shell size varies between 9 mm and 16 mm. Its orange-brown coloring has some white spots.

== Distribution ==
This species is distributed in the Red Sea and in the Gulf of Mexico, the Caribbean Sea and the Lesser Antilles, and from Florida to Brazil.
