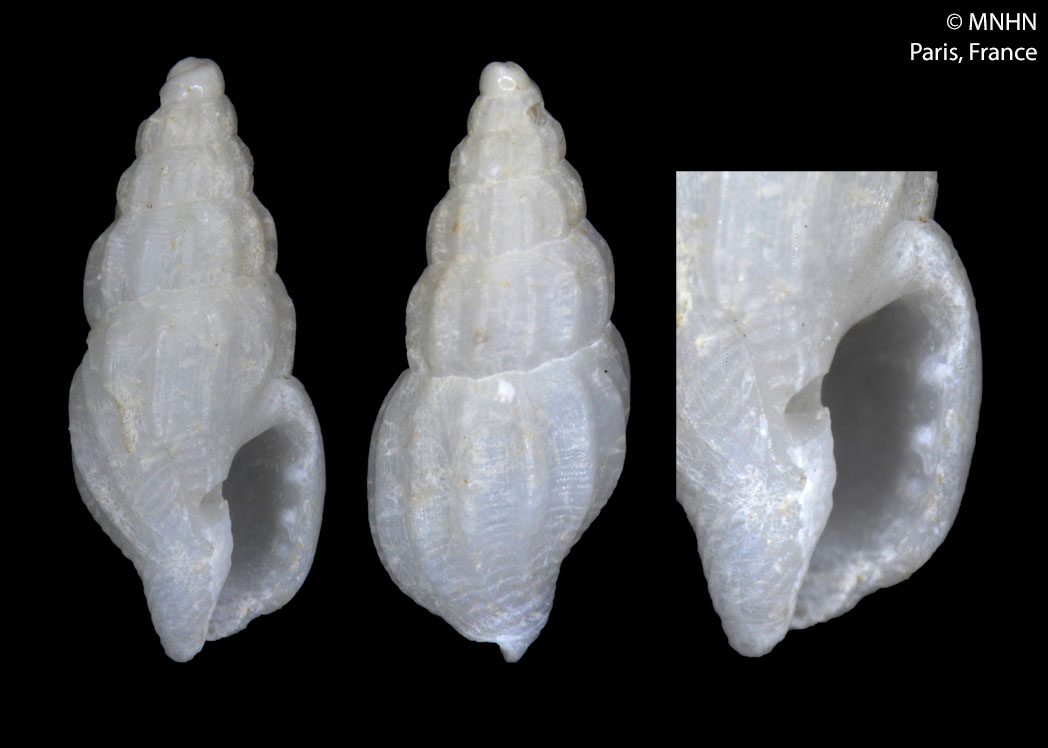
- Shell of Zafrona samadiae (holotype at MNHN, Paris)

Scientific classification
- Kingdom: Animalia
- Phylum: Mollusca
- Class: Gastropoda
- Subclass: Caenogastropoda
- Order: Neogastropoda
- Superfamily: Buccinoidea
- Family: Columbellidae
- Genus: Zafrona
- Species: Z. samadiae

Binomial name
- Zafrona samadiae K. Monsecour & D. Monsecour, 2016

= Zafrona samadiae =

Species of gastropod

Zafrona samadiae is a species of sea snail, a marine gastropod mollusk in the family Columbellidae, the dove snails.

== Distribution ==
This deep-water marine species occurs off New Caledonia.
