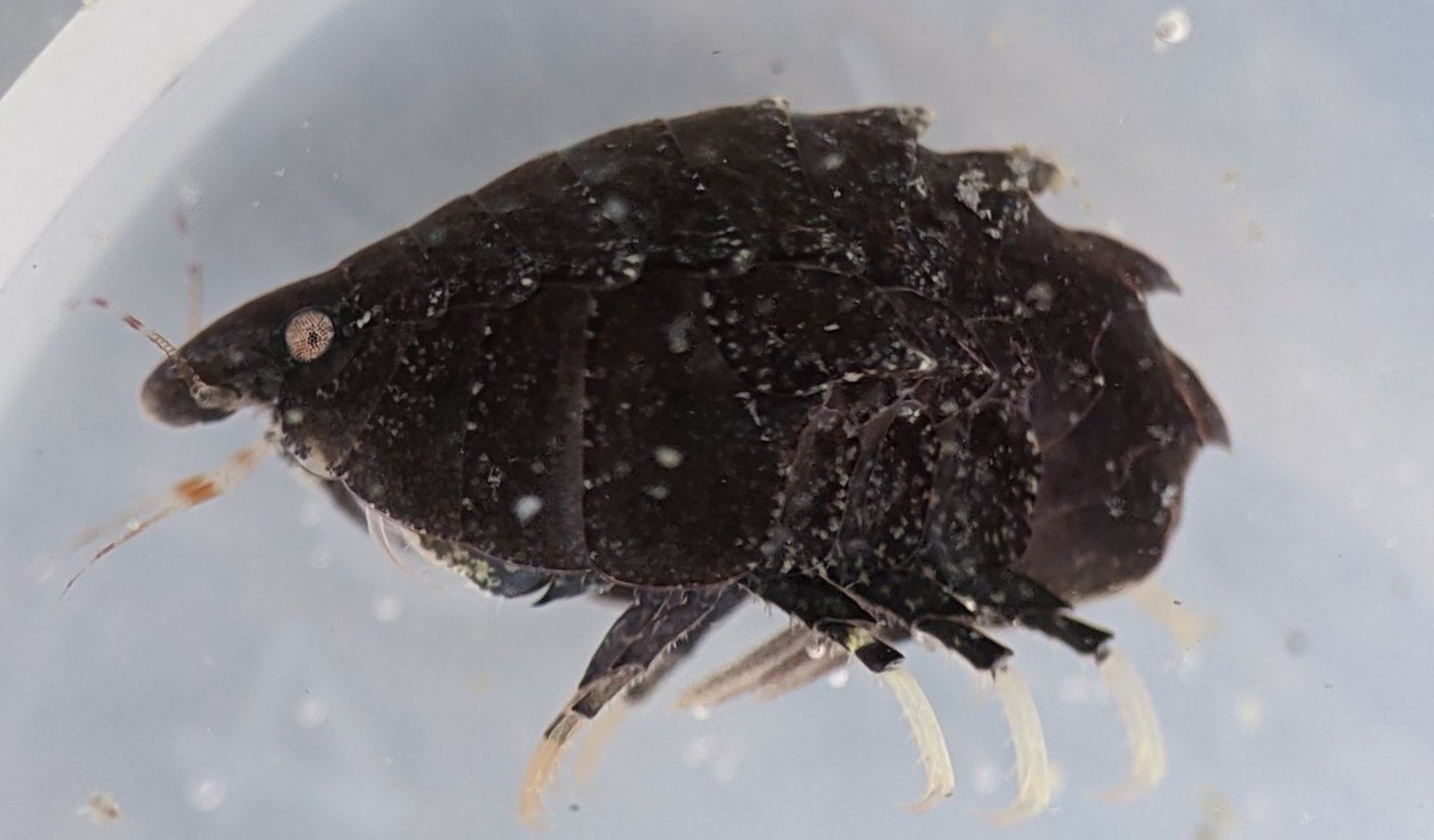
- Thorlaksonius sp.

Scientific classification
- Kingdom: Animalia
- Phylum: Arthropoda
- Class: Malacostraca
- Order: Amphipoda
- Family: Pleustidae
- Subfamily: Pleustinae
- Genus: Thorlaksonius; Bousfield & Hendrycks, 1994

= Thorlaksonius =

Genus of crustaceans

Thorlaksonius is a genus of crustaceans in the family Pleustidae. It is native to northeastern and northwestern Pacific regions of the North American and Asia coastlines.

== Species ==
- Thorlaksonius amchitkanus Bousfield & Hendrycks, 1994
- Thorlaksonius borealis Bousfield & Hendrycks, 1994
- Thorlaksonius brevirostris Bousfield & Hendrycks, 1994
- Thorlaksonius carinatus Bousfield & Hendrycks, 1994
- Thorlaksonius depressus (Alderman, 1936)
- Thorlaksonius grandirostris Bousfield & Hendrycks, 1994
- Thorlaksonius incarinatus (Gurjanova, 1938)
- Thorlaksonius obesirostris (Bulyčeva, 1952)
- Thorlaksonius platypus (Barnard & Given, 1960)
- Thorlaksonius subcarinatus Bousfield & Hendrycks, 1994
- Thorlaksonius truncatus Bousfield & Hendrycks, 1994
