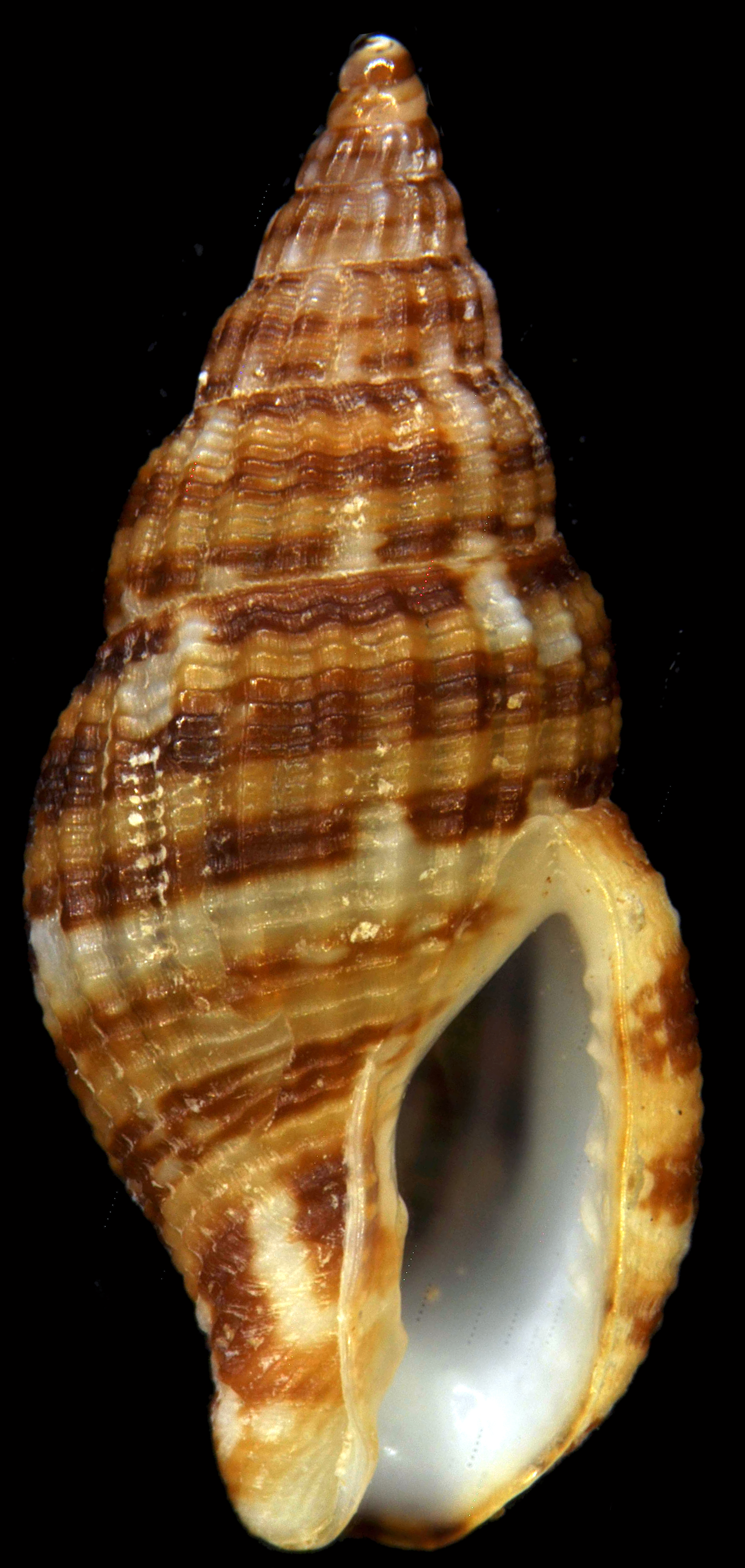
- Shell of Falsuszafrona pseudopulchella (holotype at MNHN, Paris)

Scientific classification
- Kingdom: Animalia
- Phylum: Mollusca
- Class: Gastropoda
- Subclass: Caenogastropoda
- Order: Neogastropoda
- Superfamily: Buccinoidea
- Family: Columbellidae
- Genus: Falsuszafrona; Pelorce, 2020

Type species
- Columbella idalina Duclos, 1840

Species
- See text

= Falsuszafrona =

Genus of gastropods

Falsuszafrona is a genus of sea snails, marine gastropod mollusks in the family Columbellidae.

== Species ==
Species within the genus Falsuszafrona include:

- Falsuszafrona belkisae (Espinosa & Ortea, 2007)
- Falsuszafrona dicomata (Dall, 1889)
- Falsuszafrona diversa (Espinosa, Ortea & Fernández-Garcés, 2007)
- Falsuszafrona idalina (Duclos, 1840)
- Falsuszafrona incerta (Stearns, 1892)
- Falsuszafrona lindae (Petuch, 1992)
- Falsuszafrona pseudopulchella Pelorce, 2020
- Falsuszafrona pulchella (Blainville, 1829)
- Falsuszafrona sunderlandi (Petuch, 1987)
- Falsuszafrona taylorae (Petuch, 1987)
- Falsuszafrona tortugana (Garcia, 2015)
