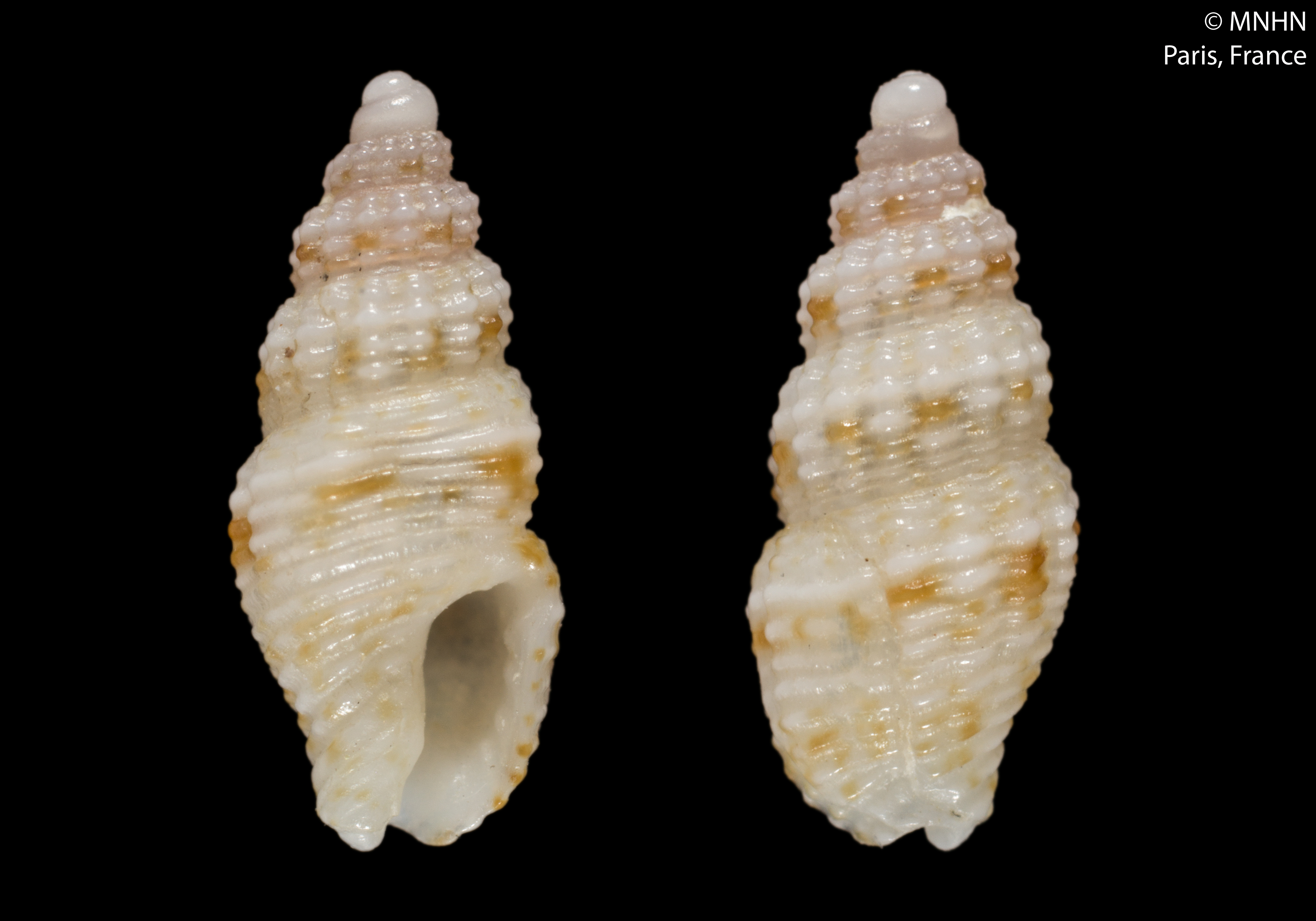
- Shell of Zafrona kilburni (holotype at MNHN, Paris)

Scientific classification
- Kingdom: Animalia
- Phylum: Mollusca
- Class: Gastropoda
- Subclass: Caenogastropoda
- Order: Neogastropoda
- Family: Columbellidae
- Genus: Zafrona
- Species: Z. kilburni

Binomial name
- Zafrona kilburni Bozzetti, 2009

= Zafrona kilburni =

Species of gastropod

Zafrona kilburni is a species of sea snail, a marine gastropod mollusk in the family Columbellidae, the dove snails.

== Description ==
The length of the shell attains 6.2 mm.

== Distribution ==
This marine species occurs off Madagascar.
