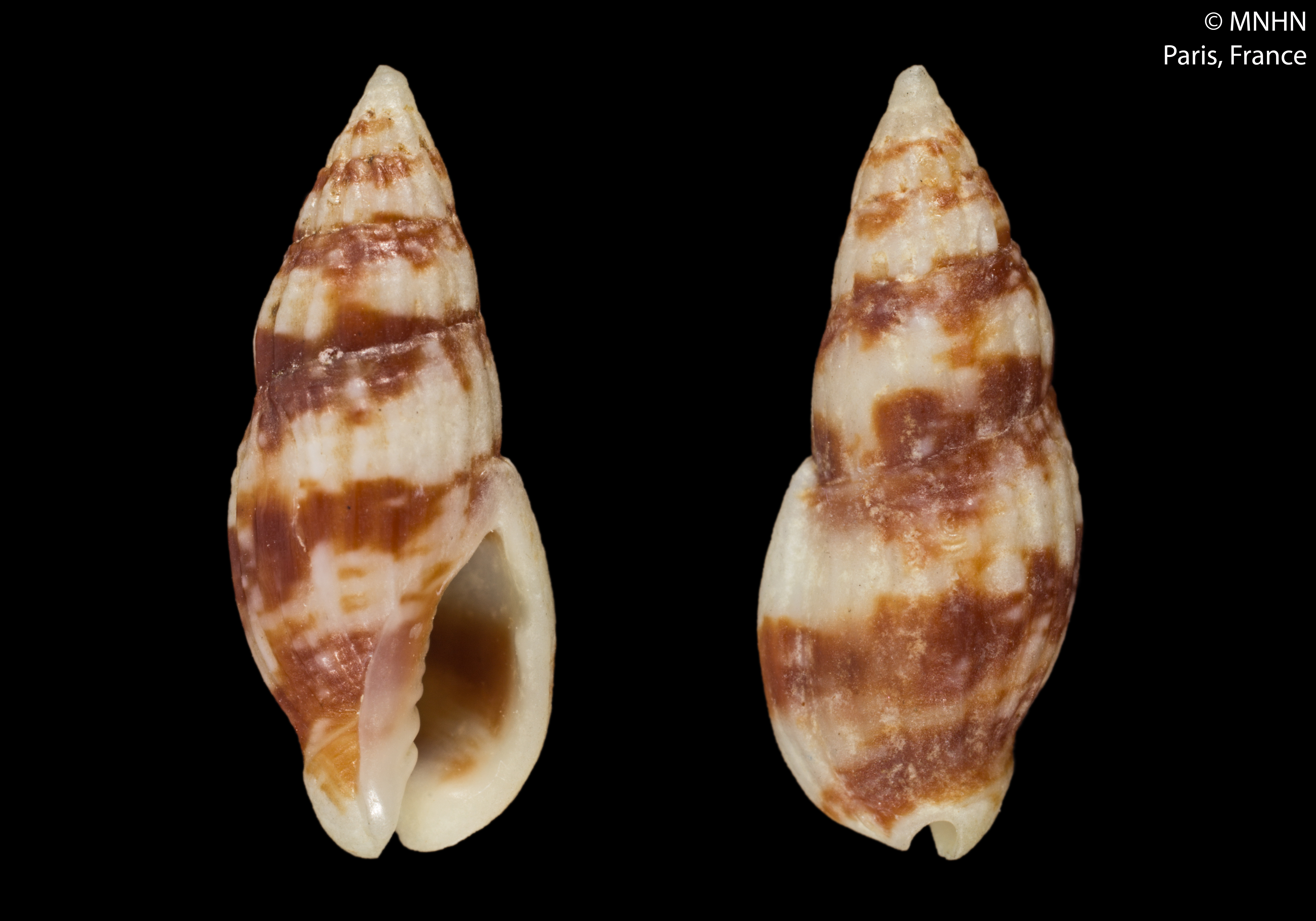
- Shell of Zafrona somalica (holotype at MNHN, Paris)

Scientific classification
- Kingdom: Animalia
- Phylum: Mollusca
- Class: Gastropoda
- Subclass: Caenogastropoda
- Order: Neogastropoda
- Superfamily: Buccinoidea
- Family: Columbellidae
- Genus: Zafrona
- Species: Z. somalica

Binomial name
- Zafrona somalica Bozzetti, 2007

= Zafrona somalica =

Species of gastropod

Zafrona somalica is a species of sea snail, a marine gastropod mollusk in the family Columbellidae, the dove snails.

== Description ==
The length of the shell attains 13.1 mm, its diameter is 5.35 mm.

== Distribution ==
This marine species occurs off Somalia.
