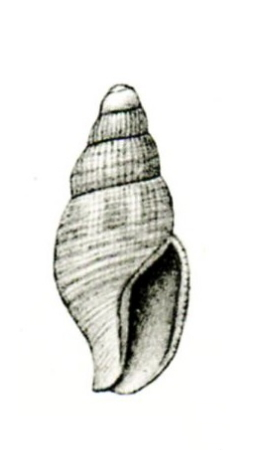
- Shell of Zafrona ursula (holotype)

Scientific classification
- Kingdom: Animalia
- Phylum: Mollusca
- Class: Gastropoda
- Subclass: Caenogastropoda
- Order: Neogastropoda
- Superfamily: Buccinoidea
- Family: Columbellidae
- Genus: Zafrona
- Species: Z. ursula

Binomial name
- Zafrona ursula (Thiele, 1925)

Synonyms
- Anachis ursula (Thiele, 1925); Columbella ursula Thiele, 1925 (original combination)

= Zafrona ursula =

Species of gastropod

Zafrona ursula is a species of sea snail, a marine gastropod mollusk in the family Columbellidae, the dove snails.

== Description ==
The length of the shell attains 5 mm.

== Distribution ==
This marine species occurs off South Africa.
