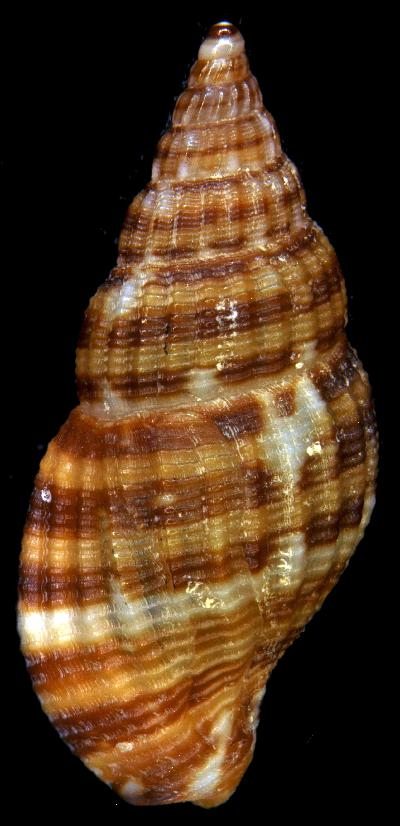
- Shell of Falsuszafrona pseudopulchella (holotype at MNHN, Paris)

Scientific classification
- Kingdom: Animalia
- Phylum: Mollusca
- Class: Gastropoda
- Subclass: Caenogastropoda
- Order: Neogastropoda
- Superfamily: Buccinoidea
- Family: Columbellidae
- Genus: Falsuszafrona
- Species: F. pseudopulchella

Binomial name
- Falsuszafrona pseudopulchella Pelorce, 2020

= Falsuszafrona pseudopulchella =

Species of gastropod

Falsuszafrona pseudopulchella is a species of sea snail, a marine gastropod mollusk in the family Columbellidae, the dove snails.

== Description ==
The length of the shell attains 9.6 mm.

== Distribution ==
This marine species occurs off Guadeloupe, Caribbean Sea.
