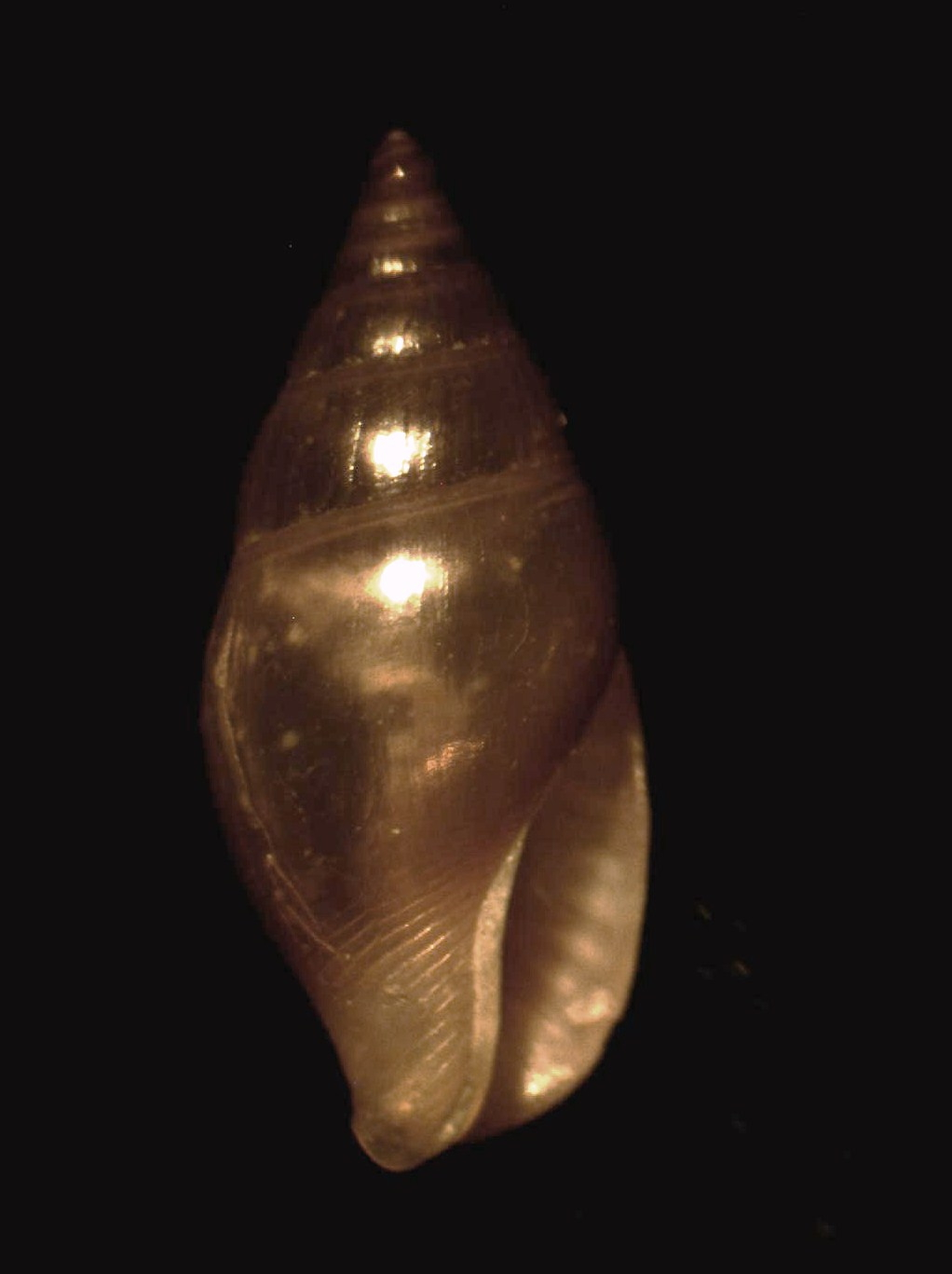
- Shell of Falsuszafrona lindae

Scientific classification
- Kingdom: Animalia
- Phylum: Mollusca
- Class: Gastropoda
- Subclass: Caenogastropoda
- Order: Neogastropoda
- Superfamily: Buccinoidea
- Family: Columbellidae
- Genus: Falsuszafrona
- Species: F. lindae

Binomial name
- Falsuszafrona lindae (Petuch, 1992)

Synonyms
- Zafrona lindae (Petuch, 1992) (original combination)

= Falsuszafrona lindae =

Species of gastropod

Falsuszafrona lindae is a species of sea snail, a marine gastropod mollusk in the family Columbellidae, the dove snails.

== Description ==
The length of the shell attains 7 mm.

== Distribution ==
This marine species occurs in the Caribbean Sea.
