= Falsuszafrona taylorae =

Scientific classification
- Kingdom: Animalia
- Phylum: Mollusca
- Class: Gastropoda
- Subclass: Caenogastropoda
- Order: Neogastropoda
- Superfamily: Buccinoidea
- Family: Columbellidae
- Genus: Falsuszafrona
- Species: F. taylorae

Binomial name
- Falsuszafrona taylorae (Petuch, 1987)

Synonyms
- Zafrona taylorae Petuch, 1987 (original combination)

Species of sea snail

Falsuszafrona taylorae is a species of sea snail, a marine gastropod mollusk in the family Columbellidae, the dove snails.

== Description ==
Original description: "Shell fusiform, elongated, with elevated spire; shoulder and spire whorls rounded; shell sculptured with numerous microscopic spiral threads, giving shell shiny, silky texture; 3 or 4 spiral threads near suture larger than others; body whorl without axial sculpture; columellar callus raised, with edge detached from shell; columella with 1 large, prominent plication; inner edge of lip bordered with 8-12 small teeth; shell translucent pale greenish-tan overlaid with dense light brown net pattern; holes in mesh of net pattern oval in shape, regularly spaced; some specimens with thin, clear band around mid-body; protoconch and early whorls dark purple-brown; columella and edge of lip white; net pattern showing through in interior of aperture."

== Distribution ==
Locus typicus: "Rabbit Key Basin, off Rabbit Key,
Florida Bay, Everglades National Park, Florida, USA."
