= Falsuszafrona sunderlandi =

Scientific classification
- Kingdom: Animalia
- Phylum: Mollusca
- Class: Gastropoda
- Subclass: Caenogastropoda
- Order: Neogastropoda
- Superfamily: Buccinoidea
- Family: Columbellidae
- Genus: Falsuszafrona
- Species: F. sunderlandi

Binomial name
- Falsuszafrona sunderlandi (Petuch, 1987)

Synonyms
- Zafrona sunderlandi Petuch, 1987 (original combination)

Species of gastropod

Falsuszafrona sunderlandi is a species of sea snail, a marine gastropod mollusk in the family Columbellidae, the dove snails.

== Description ==
The length of the shell attains 6.5 mm.

== Distribution ==
This marine species occurs off the Bahamas and Honduras.
