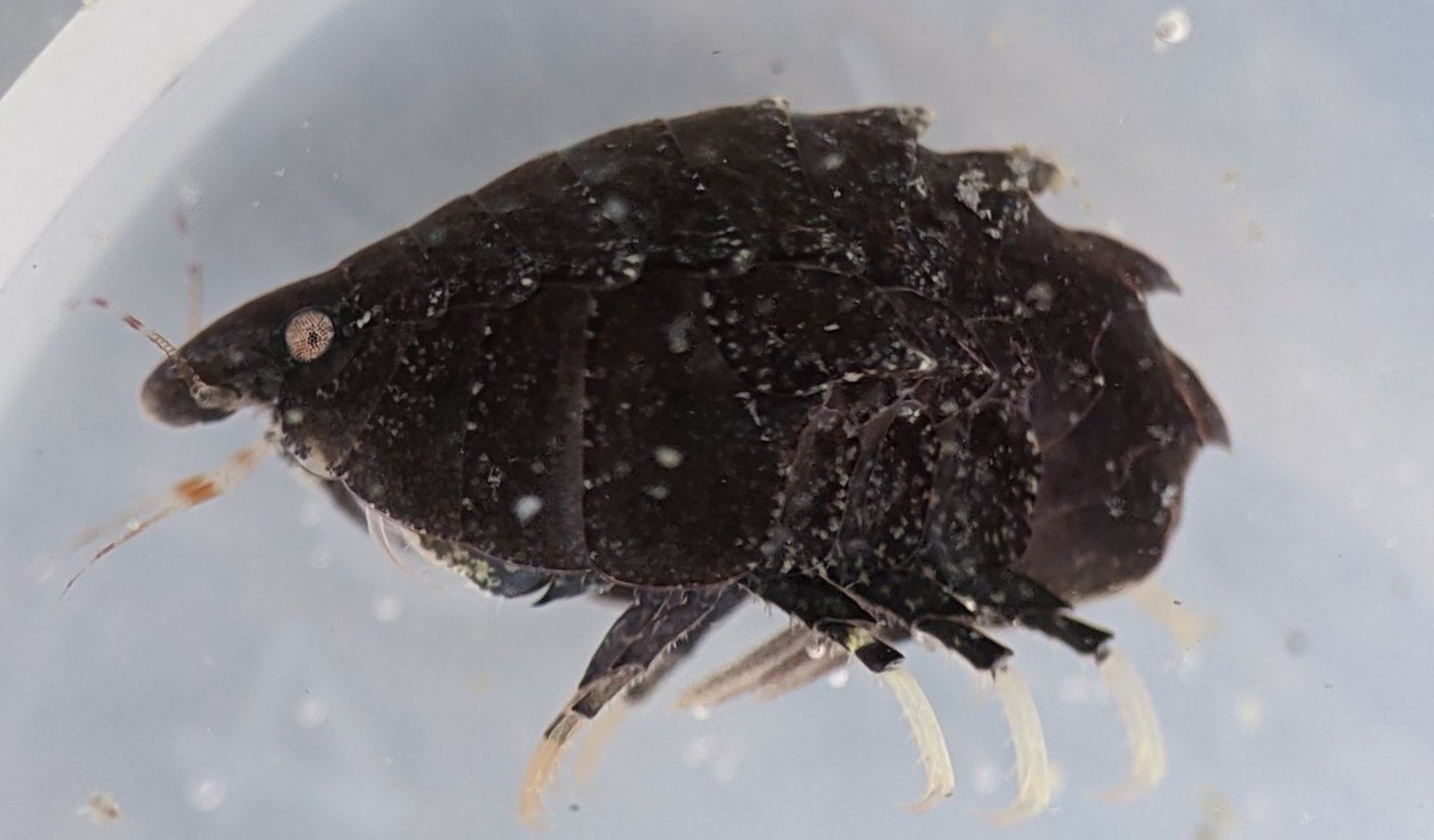
- Thorlaksonius sp.

Scientific classification
- Kingdom: Animalia
- Phylum: Arthropoda
- Class: Malacostraca
- Order: Amphipoda
- Parvorder: Amphilochidira
- Superfamily: Amphilochoidea
- Family: Pleustidae; Buchholz, 1874

= Pleustidae =

Family of crustaceans

Pleustidae is a family of cosmopolitan amphipods belonging to the order Amphipoda. Generally, members of this family are benthic carnivores. They are characterized by tooth-like projections on their dorsal plates, as well as specialized gnathopods for grabbing prey.

== Description ==
Pleustid amphipods typically measure between 2–30 millimetres (0.079–1.181 in). They can possess strong colorations, from solid black and white to spotted and mottled sandy colors. Sometimes, they are brightly colored, which is hypothesized to be an example of aposematism.

Carinated, tooth-like projections of the dorsal surface of the pereon and pleon segments are common in this family. Another important diagnostic characteristic is the shape of the lower lip, where the outer lobes are tilted at an odd angle and the inner lobes are broad.

Other characteristics of the family include the second urosome segment being smaller than the first and third segments, the rostrum typically curving downwards, the first pair of antennae typically having a highly reduced accessory flagellum, the second pair of gnathopods being larger than the first, and the presence of a short telson.

This family may be difficult to distinguish from members of the superfamily Eusiroidea, as they share many common characteristics, including pointed heads and appendages of similar shapes.

== Distribution ==
Species of Pleustids have been described from across the globe, including Antarctica. Many of the described species come from the west coast of North America.

== Reproduction ==
Members of the family Pleustidae may possess some degree of sexual dimorphism, though these differences are small. Females may be slightly larger than males, have smaller eyes, and have numerous differences of the various appendages. Unlike in family Phoxocephalidae, Pleustid amphipods do not aggregate in swarms to reproduce.

== Genera ==
The family contains 36 genera in 12 subfamilies:

- Subfamily Atylopsinae Bousfield & Hendrycks, 1994
  - Atylopsis Stebbing, 1888
  - Myzotarsa Cadien & Martin, 1999
- Subfamily Austropleustinae Bousfield & Hendrycks, 1994
  - Austropleustes K.H. Barnard, 1931
  - Tepidopleustes Karaman & Barnard, 1979
- Subfamily Dactylopleustinae Bousfield & Hendrycks, 1994
  - Dactylopleustes Barnard & Karaman, 1979
- Subfamily Eosymtinae Bousfield & Hendrycks, 1994
  - Cognateosymtes Labay, 2018
  - Eosymtes Bousfield & Hendrycks, 1994
- Subfamily Mesopleustinae Bousfield & Hendrycks, 1994
  - Mesopleustes Stebbing, 1899
- Subfamily Neopleustinae Bousfield & Hendrycks, 1994
  - Hendrycksopleustes Labay, 2021
  - Neopleustes Stebbing, 1906
  - Pleustostenus Gurjanova, 1972
  - Shoemakeroides Hendrycks & Bousfield, 2004
- Subfamily Parapleustinae Bousfield & Hendrycks, 1994
  - Chromopleustes Bousfield & Hendrycks, 1995
  - Commensipleustes Bousfield & Hendrycks, 1995
  - Gnathopleustes Bousfield & Hendrycks, 1995
  - Incisocalliope J.L. Barnard in J.L. Barnard & Reish, 1959
  - Micropleustes Bousfield & Hendrycks, 1995
  - Parapleustes Buchholz, 1874
  - Trachypleustes Bousfield & Hendrycks, 1995
- Subfamily Pleusirinae Bousfield & Hendrycks, 1994
  - Pleusirus J.L. Barnard, 1969
- Subfamily Pleustinae Buchholz, 1874
  - Pleustes Spence Bate, 1858
  - Thorlaksonius Bousfield & Hendrycks, 1994
- Subfamily Pleustoidinae Bousfield & Hendrycks, 1994
  - Pleustoides Gurjanova, 1972
- Subfamily Pleusymtinae Bousfield & Hendrycks, 1994
  - Anomalosymtes Hendrycks & Bousfield, 2004
  - Budnikopleustes Hendrycks & Bousfield, 2004
  - Heteropleustes Hendrycks & Bousfield, 2004
  - Holopleustes Hendrycks & Bousfield, 2004
  - Kamptopleustes Hendrycks & Bousfield, 2004
  - Pleustomesus Guryanova, 1972
  - Pleusymtes J.L. Barnard, 1969
  - Rhinopleustes Hendrycks & Bousfield, 2004
  - Vinogradovopleustes Labay, 2018
- Subfamily Stenopleustinae Bousfield & Hendrycks, 1994
  - Arctopleustes Gurjanova, 1972
  - Domicola Pretus & Abello, 1993
  - Gracilipleustes Hendrycks & Bousfield, 2004
  - Stenopleustes G.O. Sars, 1893
