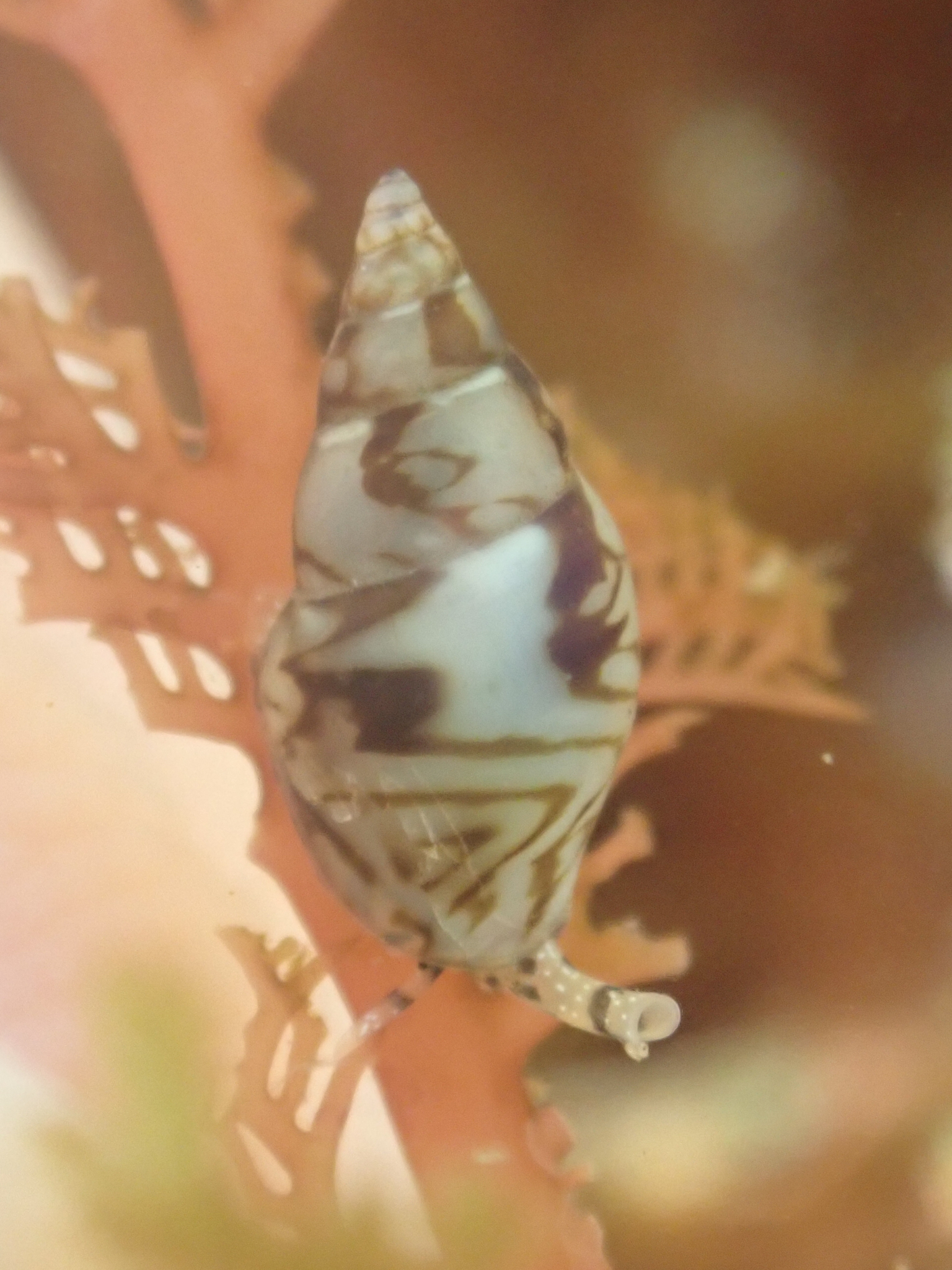
- A. carinata in La Jolla, California

Scientific classification
- Kingdom: Animalia
- Phylum: Mollusca
- Class: Gastropoda
- Subclass: Caenogastropoda
- Order: Neogastropoda
- Family: Columbellidae
- Genus: Alia
- Species: A. carinata

Binomial name
- Alia carinata (Hinds, 1844)

Synonyms
- Alia callimorpha Dall, 1919; Alia gouldii (Carpenter, 1857); Columbella californiana Gaskoin, 1851; Columbella carinata Hinds, 1844 (original combination); Columbella hindsii Reeve, 1858; Mitrella callimorpha (Dall, 1919); Mitrella carinata (Hinds, 1844); Nitidella carinata (Hinds, 1844); Nitidella gouldii Carpenter, 1857 (original combination)

= Alia carinata =

Species of gastropod

Alia carinata, common name the carinate dove shell, is a species of very small sea snail, a marine gastropod mollusc in the family Columbellidae, the dove snails.

== Distribution ==
This species is found in the Eastern Pacific, from Alaska to Baja California, Mexico. It can be found on patches of algae, rocks, eelgrass, and especially on surfgrass.

== Description ==
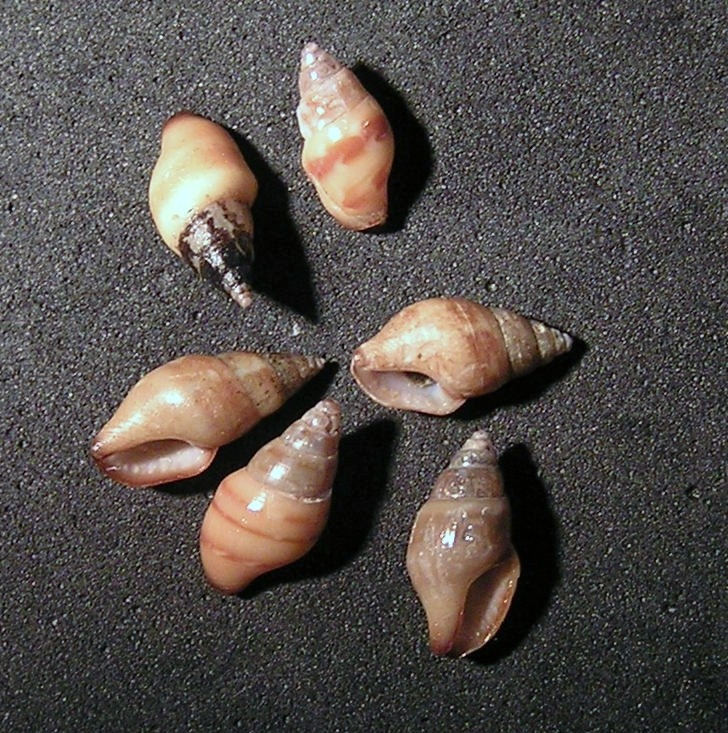
Six shells of A. carinata showing variability

The adult size of the shell of this species of dove snail can be between 6–11 mm (0.24–0.43 in) in length. The body whorl is sometimes carinate (having a pronounced keel), sometimes less so, and sometimes not at all. The shell color is quite variable; it can be one uniform color or patterned with multiple shades of color. It has a stenoglossan radula with bicuspate lateral teeth and a slightly curved rachidian tooth.

== Ecology ==
Alia carinata has been shown to be able to detect the presence of predators solely by the presence of chemicals in the water. When the sea star predator Leptasterias hexactis is near, A. carinata may choose to run away, rear up, or fight (usually after they have already tried running). When fighting, the snail bites the tube feet of its pursuer.

Some species of amphipods are known to mimic A. carinata, including Thorlaksonius platypus.
