= Falsuszafrona diversa =

Scientific classification
- Kingdom: Animalia
- Phylum: Mollusca
- Class: Gastropoda
- Subclass: Caenogastropoda
- Order: Neogastropoda
- Superfamily: Buccinoidea
- Family: Columbellidae
- Genus: Falsuszafrona
- Species: F. diversa

Binomial name
- Falsuszafrona diversa (Espinosa, Ortea & Fernadez-Garcés, 2007)

Synonyms
- Zafrona diversa Espinosa, Ortea & Fernández-Garcés, 2007 (original combination)

Species of gastropod

Zafrona diversa is a species of sea snail, a marine gastropod mollusk in the family Columbellidae, the dove snails.

== Distribution ==
This marine species occurs off Cuba.
