= Falsuszafrona belkisae =

Scientific classification
- Kingdom: Animalia
- Phylum: Mollusca
- Class: Gastropoda
- Subclass: Caenogastropoda
- Order: Neogastropoda
- Superfamily: Buccinoidea
- Family: Columbellidae
- Genus: Falsuszafrona
- Species: F. belkisae

Binomial name
- Falsuszafrona belkisae (Espinosa, Ortea, Fernandez-Garcés & Moro, 2007)

Synonyms
- Zafrona belkisae Espinosa & Ortea, 2007 (original combination)

Species of gastropod

Falsuszafrona belkisae is a species of sea snail, a marine gastropod mollusk in the family Columbellidae, the dove snails.

== Description ==
The length of the shell attains 9.2 mm, its diameter 3.4 mm.

== Distribution ==
This marine species occurs off the Guadeloupe and Guanahacabibes Peninsula, Cuba.
