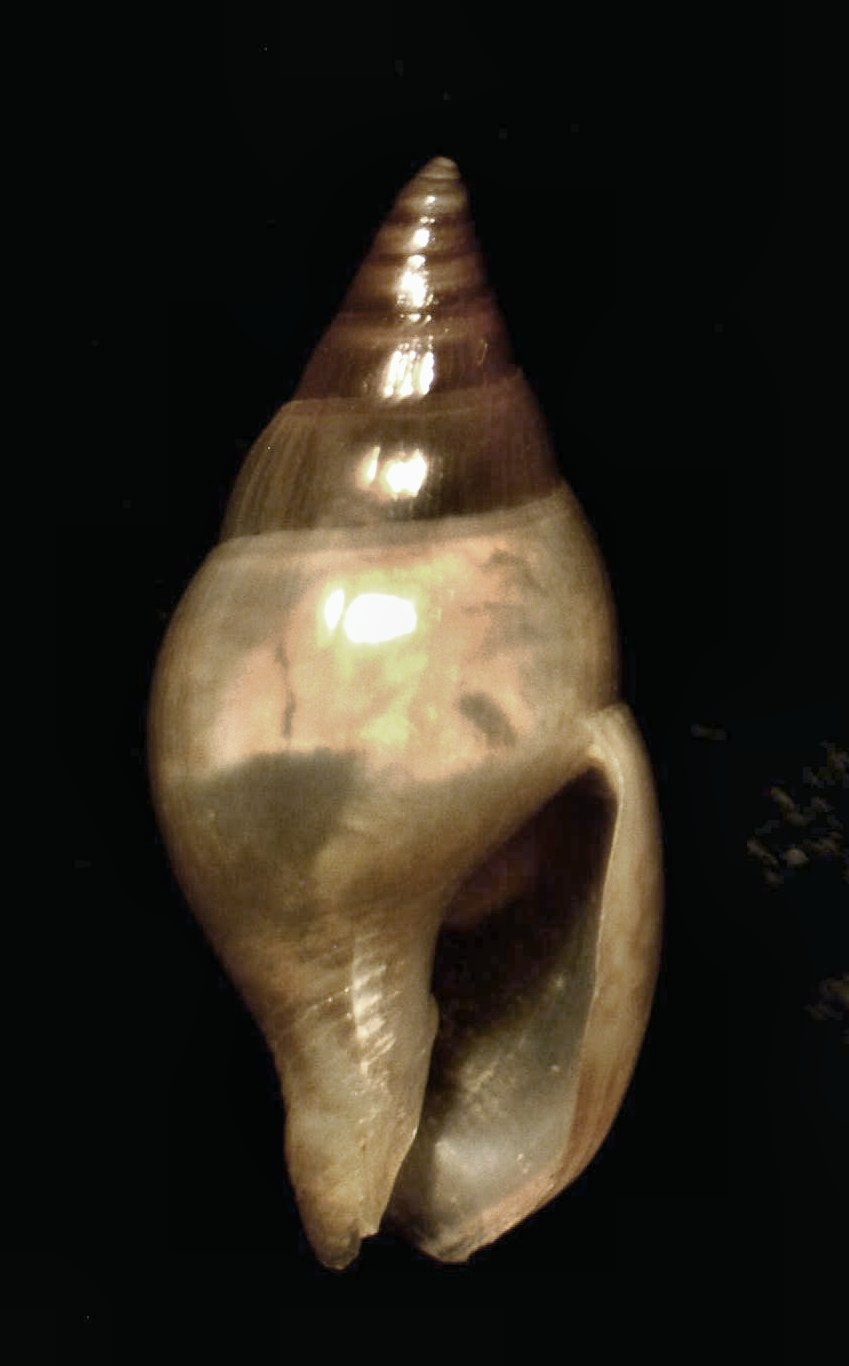

Scientific classification
- Kingdom: Animalia
- Phylum: Mollusca
- Class: Gastropoda
- Subclass: Caenogastropoda
- Order: Neogastropoda
- Superfamily: Buccinoidea
- Family: Columbellidae
- Genus: Falsuszafrona
- Species: F. idalina

Binomial name
- Falsuszafrona idalina (Duclos, 1840)

Synonyms
- Columbella idalina Duclos, 1840 (original combination); Colombella kieneria Duclos, 1848; Colombella sagra d'Orbigny, 1846; Columbella lactea G. B. Sowerby I, 1844 junior subjective synonym; Columbella sagra var. atlantica Locard, 1897; Zafrona idalina (Duclos, 1840)

= Falsuszafrona idalina =

Species of gastropod

Falsuszafrona idalina is a species of sea snail, a marine gastropod mollusk in the family Columbellidae, the dove snails.

== Description ==
The length of the shell attains 8 mm.

(Described as Columbella lactea) The whitish, oblong-ovate shell is shining. The spire is rather short and acuminated. It contains six somewhat convex and smooth whorls. The body whorl is large. The outer lip is thickened. The aperture is rather broad. The siphonal canal is short and slightly raised.

== Distribution ==
This marine species occurs off the Bahamas and Guadeloupe.
