= Falsuszafrona tortugana =

Scientific classification
- Kingdom: Animalia
- Phylum: Mollusca
- Class: Gastropoda
- Subclass: Caenogastropoda
- Order: Neogastropoda
- Superfamily: Buccinoidea
- Family: Columbellidae
- Genus: Falsuszafrona
- Species: F. tortugana

Binomial name
- Falsuszafrona tortugana (E. F. García, 2015)

Synonyms
- Zafrona tortugana E. F. García, 2015 (original combination)

Species of gastropod

Falsuszafrona tortugana is a species of sea snail, a marine gastropod mollusk in the family Columbellidae, the dove snails.

== Description ==
The length of the shell attains 8.8 mm, its diameter is 3.5 mm.

== Distribution ==
This marine species occurs off the Dry Tortugas, Florida.
