= Falsuszafrona dicomata =

Scientific classification
- Kingdom: Animalia
- Phylum: Mollusca
- Class: Gastropoda
- Subclass: Caenogastropoda
- Order: Neogastropoda
- Superfamily: Buccinoidea
- Family: Columbellidae
- Genus: Falsuszafrona
- Species: F. dicomata

Binomial name
- Falsuszafrona dicomata (Dall, 1889)

Synonyms
- Anachis (Nitidella) moleculina var. dicomata Dall, 1889 (basionym); Zafrona dicomata (Dall, 1889) ·

Species of gastropod

Falsuszafrona dicomata is a species of sea snail, a marine gastropod mollusc in the family Columbellidae, the dove snails.

== Description ==
The length of the shell attains 5.5 mm.

This is a very pretty little form collected by Hemphill on the reefs at Key West. It differs from Mitrella moleculina (Duclos, 1840) in being smaller, more distinctly spirally grooved all over, and in having the brown color (on a translucent ground) concentrated in two revolving brown bands, one above and the other below the periphery, the upper one alone being visible on the older whorls.

== Distribution ==
This marine species occurs off Key West, Florida, the Bahamas, Martinique and Guadeloupe
