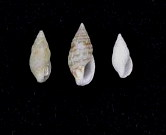
- Three shells of Falsuszafrona pulchella (museum specimens at Naturalis Biodiversity Center)

Scientific classification
- Kingdom: Animalia
- Phylum: Mollusca
- Class: Gastropoda
- Subclass: Caenogastropoda
- Order: Neogastropoda
- Superfamily: Buccinoidea
- Family: Columbellidae
- Genus: Falsuszafrona
- Species: F. pulchella

Binomial name
- Falsuszafrona pulchella (Blainville, 1829)

Synonyms
- Anachis subcostulata (C. B. Adams, 1845); Anachis subcostulata var. subcincta Nowell-Usticke, 1969; Buccinum oryza Dunker, 1847; Buccinum pulchellum Blainville, 1829 (original combination); Columbella subcostulata C. B. Adams, 1845; Mitrella (Astyris) elegantula Mörch, 1860; Mitrella elegantula Mörch, 1860; Parvanachis pulchella (Blainville, 1829); Pyrene pulchella G.B. Sowerby, 1844; Zafrona pulchella (Blainville, 1829)

= Falsuszafrona pulchella =

Species of gastropod

Falsuszafrona pulchella is a species of sea snail, a marine gastropod mollusk in the family Columbellidae, the dove snails.

== Description ==
The length of the shell varies between 6 mm and 12 mm.

The oblong shell is lanceolate and subturreted. It isof a whitish or reddish color, beautifully varied with simple or decussated brown spots or lines, forming sometimes a very elegant network. The spire is composed of six pretty distinct, slightly swollen whorls. Numerous longitudinal folds, slightly projecting, and crossed by decurrent striae, almost amounting to folds, can be seen at the base of the body whorl. The whitish aperture is narrow and elongated. The outer lip is rather thin and indistinctly denticulated within.

== Distribution ==
This species occurs in the Caribbean Sea, the Gulf of Mexico and off the Lesser Antilles and Puerto Rico.
