= Falsuszafrona incerta =

Scientific classification
- Kingdom: Animalia
- Phylum: Mollusca
- Class: Gastropoda
- Subclass: Caenogastropoda
- Order: Neogastropoda
- Superfamily: Buccinoidea
- Family: Columbellidae
- Genus: Falsuszafrona
- Species: F. incerta

Binomial name
- Falsuszafrona incerta (Stearns, 1892)

Synonyms
- Anachis incerta (Stearns, 1892); Nitidella incerta Stearns, 1892 (original combination); Zafrona incerta (Stearns, 1892) ·

Species of gastropod

Falsuszafrona incerta is a species of sea snail, a marine gastropod mollusk in the family Columbellidae, the dove snails.

== Description ==
The length of the shell attains 6 mm, its diameter 2.75 mm.

(Original description) The small shell is rather solid and acutely ovate. The elevated spire is pointed. The shell contains six to seven whorls, moderately convex, with inconspicuous revolving grooves. The upper whorls are delicately sculptured with close-set rounded longitudinal ribs. The apex is obtuse. The aperture measures nearly half the length of the shell. The outer lip is somewhat thickened with five to seven denticles on the inner side. The columella shows a single rather prominent plait or tubercle just below the middle. The surface is colored by five to six brownish-red bands, alternating with as many white.

== Distribution ==
This marine species occurs off the Galapagos
