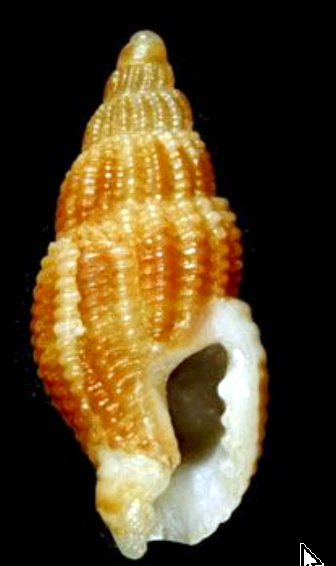
- Shell of Anachis aliceae (specimen at the Natural History Museum Rotterdam)

Scientific classification
- Kingdom: Animalia
- Phylum: Mollusca
- Class: Gastropoda
- Subclass: Caenogastropoda
- Order: Neogastropoda
- Family: Columbellidae
- Genus: Anachis
- Species: A. aliceae

Binomial name
- Anachis aliceae (Pallary, 1900)

Synonyms
- Columbella (Seminella) aliceae Pallary, 1900

= Anachis aliceae =

Species of gastropod

Anachis aliceae is a species of sea snail in the family Columbellidae, the dove snails.

== Description ==
(Original description in French) This species differs from Anachis aurantia (Lamarck, 1822) by its less acute spire, its larger apex, and its more numerous, larger, more salient, and more widely spaced granulations. Anachis aurantia also has each of its whorls bordered by a white ridge, which is absent in A. aliceae.

Finally, the coloration of the two shells is quite different: A. aliceae is a beautiful clear honey yellow, while Anachis aurantia is a beautiful pink.

== Distribution ==
This species occurs in the Alboran Sea off Algeria.
