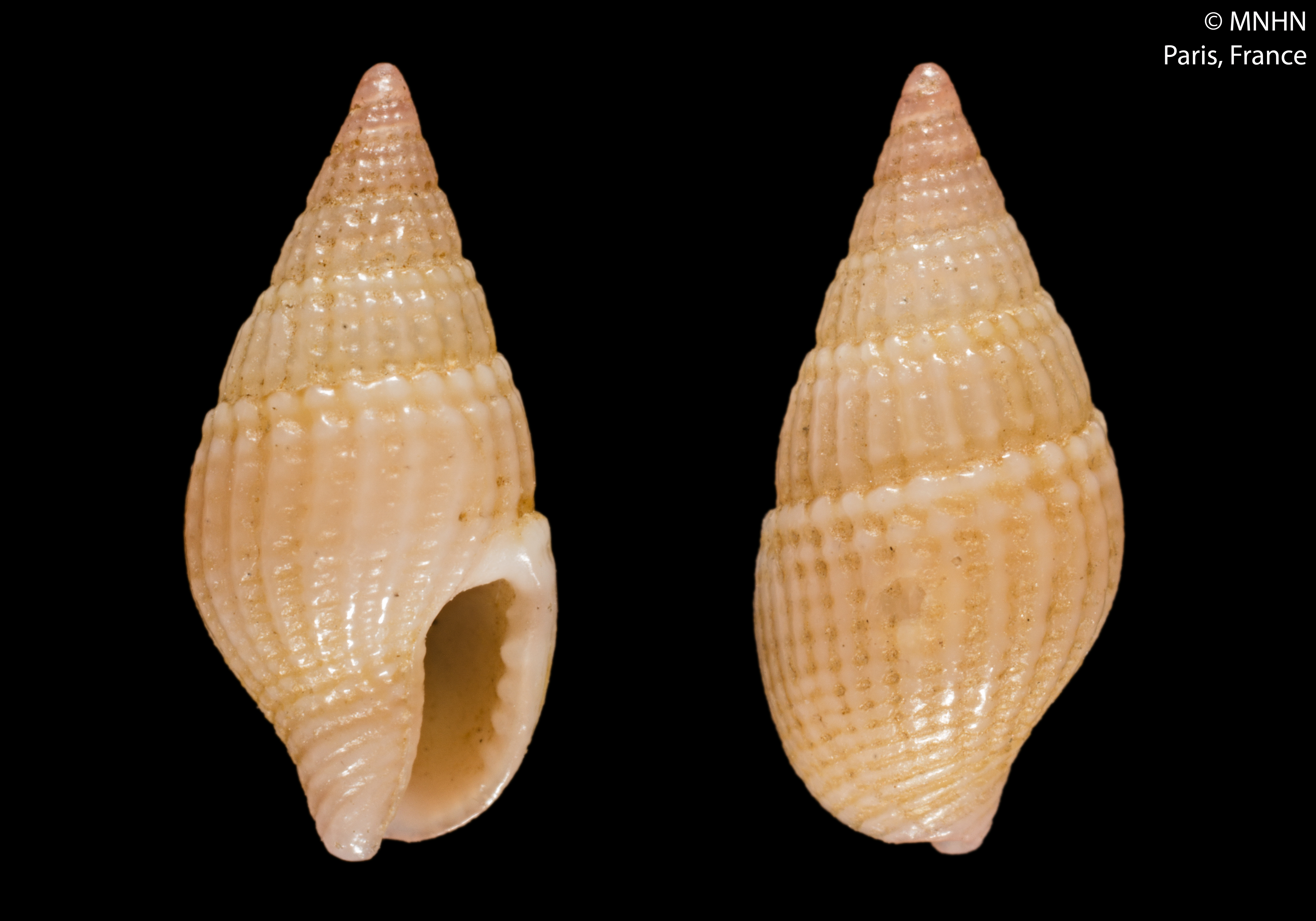
- Shell of Anachis aurantia (syntype at MNHN, Paris)

Scientific classification
- Kingdom: Animalia
- Phylum: Mollusca
- Class: Gastropoda
- Subclass: Caenogastropoda
- Order: Neogastropoda
- Family: Columbellidae
- Genus: Anachis
- Species: A. aurantia

Binomial name
- Anachis aurantia (Lamarck, 1822)

Synonyms
- Anachis cancellata (Gaskoin, 1852); Buccinum aurantium Lamarck, 1822 (original combination); Columbella aurantia Duclos, 1840; Columbella cancellata Gaskoin, 1852

= Anachis aurantia =

Species of gastropod

Anachis aurantia is a species of sea snail in the family Columbellidae, the dove snails.

== Description ==
The length of the shell attains 8 mm.

The very small shell is ovate, oblong, and attenuated at its extremities. It is of an orange yellow color. The pointed spire is composed of seven subconvex whorls, bearing upon their whole surface numerous longitudinal folds, intersected by fine transverse and approximate striae. The striae of the body whorl are a little more distinct towards the base. The sutures are ornamented, near the edge, with a row of small granulations, separated by a transverse furrow. The whitish aperture is ovate, narrow, contracted at its base. The outer lip is denticulated.

== Distribution ==
This species occurs in the Atlantic Ocean off Senegal.
