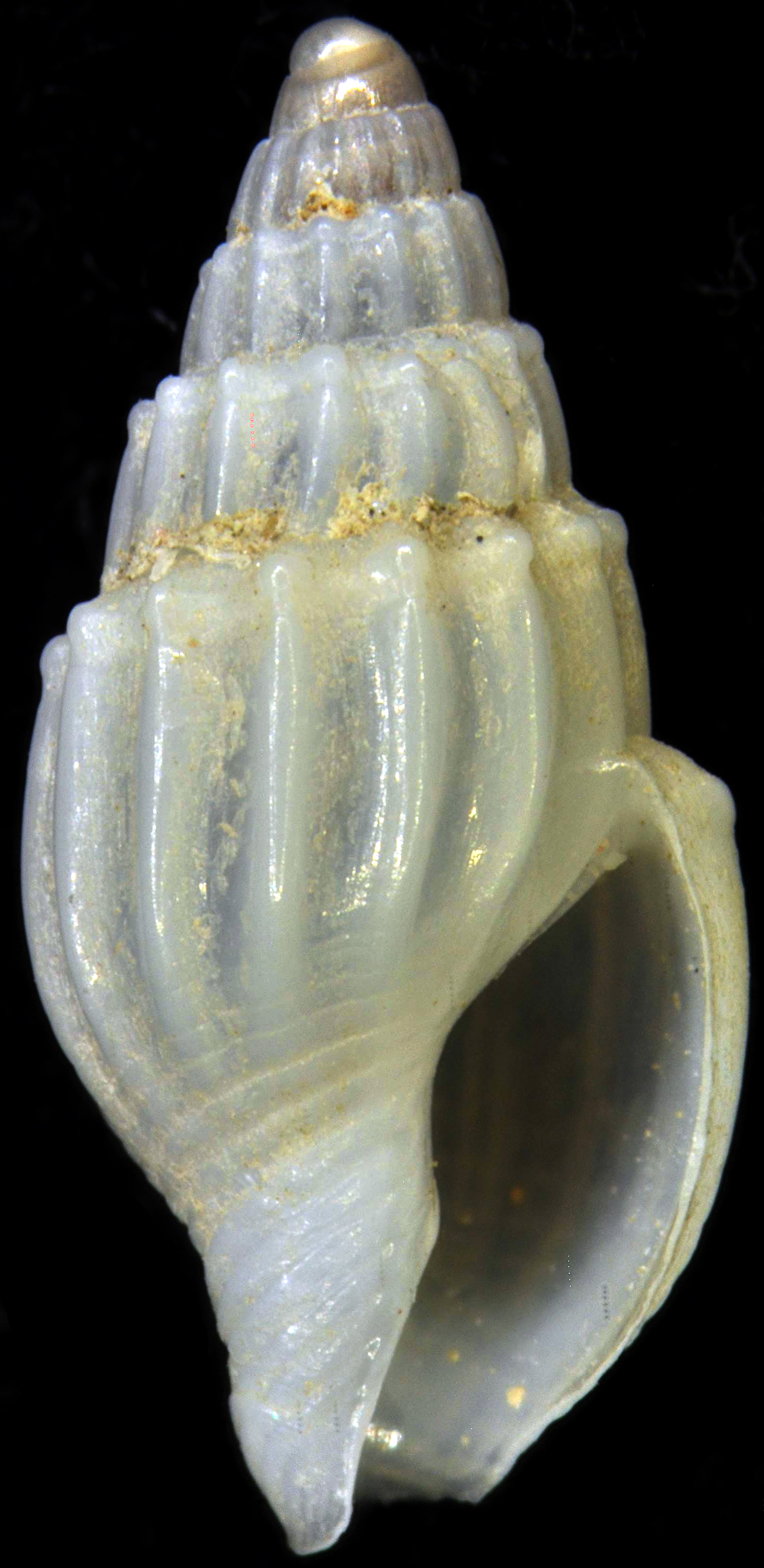
- Shell of Anachis bastionii (holotype at MNHN, Paris)

Scientific classification
- Kingdom: Animalia
- Phylum: Mollusca
- Class: Gastropoda
- Subclass: Caenogastropoda
- Order: Neogastropoda
- Family: Columbellidae
- Genus: Anachis
- Species: A. bastionii

Binomial name
- Anachis bastionii Pelorce, 2020

= Anachis bastionii =

Species of gastropod

Anachis bastionii is a species of sea snail in the family Columbellidae, the dove snails.

== Description ==
The length of the shell attains 7.4 mm.

== Distribution ==
This species occurs off Guadeloupe, Caribbean Sea.
