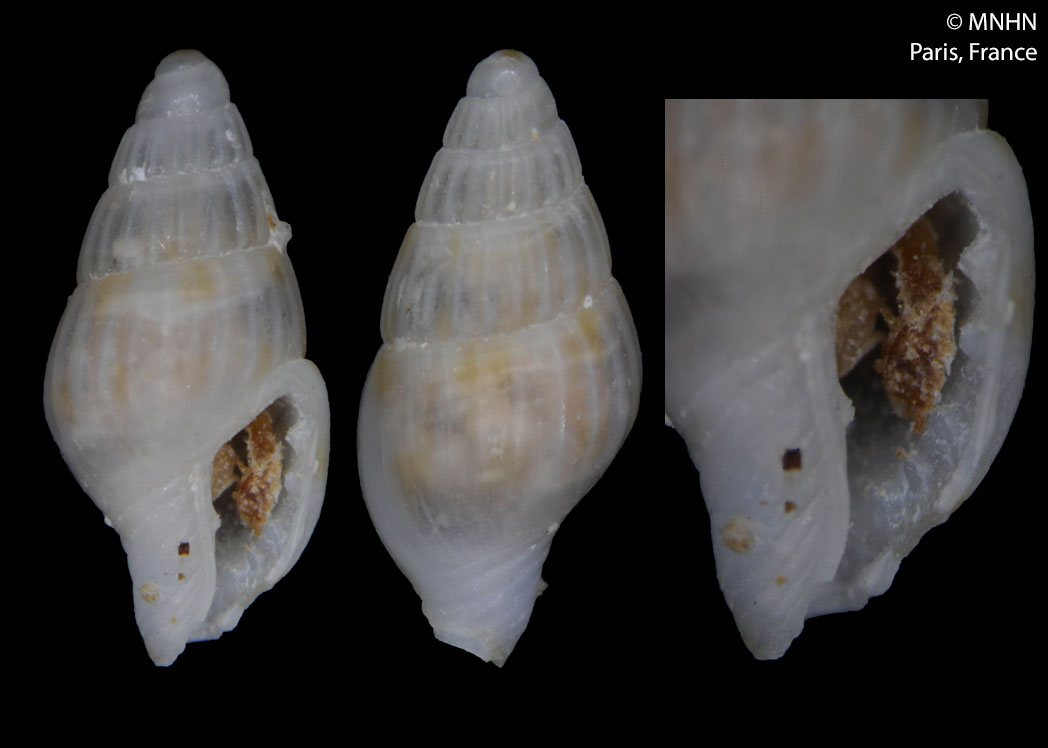
- Shell of Anachis norfolkensis (holotype at MNHN, Paris)

Scientific classification
- Kingdom: Animalia
- Phylum: Mollusca
- Class: Gastropoda
- Subclass: Caenogastropoda
- Order: Neogastropoda
- Family: Columbellidae
- Genus: Anachis
- Species: A. norfolkensis

Binomial name
- Anachis norfolkensis K. Monsecour & D. Monsecour, 2016

= Anachis norfolkensis =

Species of gastropod

Anachis norfolkensis is a species of sea snail in the family Columbellidae, the dove snails.

== Description ==
The length of the shell attains 4.4 mm.

== Distribution ==
This species occurs off New Caledonia at depths between 361 m and 365 m.
