= Anachis menaletta =

Scientific classification
- Kingdom: Animalia
- Phylum: Mollusca
- Class: Gastropoda
- Subclass: Caenogastropoda
- Order: Neogastropoda
- Family: Columbellidae
- Genus: Anachis
- Species: A. menaletta

Binomial name
- Anachis menaletta (Duclos, 1846)

Synonyms
- Anachis bartschii Dall, 1918; Anachis gaskoini P. P. Carpenter, 1857 junior subjective synonym; Colombella menaletta Duclos, 1846 superseded combination; Columbella taeniata R. A. Philippi, 1846 junior homonym (junior homonym of Columbella...); Columbella venusta Reeve, 1858

Species of gastropod

Anachis menaletta is a species of sea snail in the family Columbellidae, the dove snails.

== Description ==
(Described as Anachis gaskoini) The shell is small, rather solid, and subturreted. It is whitish, marked with narrow brownish spiral lines – five on the body whorl and two on the penultimate. It is adorned with brownish-purple spots between the posterior two on alternating ribs. The infrasutural area is white, featuring a scarcely brownish spiral line.

Comprising six normal whorls, these are somewhat rounded and separated by an impressed suture. The shell features about 13 radiating, rounded, not very prominent ribs, which become subobsolete towards the aperture. The interspaces are undulated. The surface is somewhat shiny, and is finely striulate around the base.

The aperture is subelongate and subquadrate. The outer lip is thickened and is 5-dentate internally, with a strong posterior tooth. The inner lip is scarcely projecting and is rugose above the columella. The siphonal canal is very short.

== Distribution ==
This species occurs in the Gulf of California and in the Pacific Ocean off Mexico.
