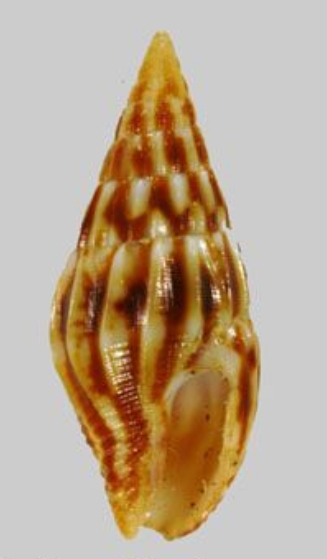
- Shell of Anachis sanfelipensis (specimen at the Natural History Museum, Rotterdam)

Scientific classification
- Kingdom: Animalia
- Phylum: Mollusca
- Class: Gastropoda
- Subclass: Caenogastropoda
- Order: Neogastropoda
- Family: Columbellidae
- Genus: Anachis
- Species: A. sanfelipensis

Binomial name
- Anachis sanfelipensis H. N. Lowe, 1935

= Anachis sanfelipensis =

Species of gastropod

Anachis sanfelipensis is a species of sea snail in the family Columbellidae, the dove snails.

== Description ==
The length of the shell attains 17 mm, its diameter is 6.5 mm.

== Distribution ==
This marine species occurs in the Sea of Cortez, Baja California, Mexico.
