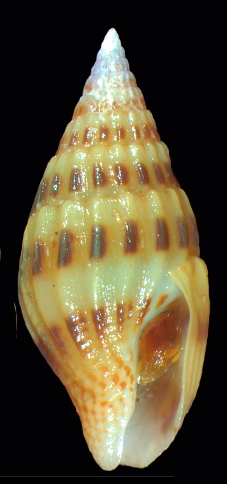
- Shell of Anachis veleda

Scientific classification
- Kingdom: Animalia
- Phylum: Mollusca
- Class: Gastropoda
- Subclass: Caenogastropoda
- Order: Neogastropoda
- Family: Columbellidae
- Genus: Anachis
- Species: A. veleda

Binomial name
- Anachis veleda (Duclos, 1846)

Synonyms
- Anachis lyrata veleda P. L. Duclos, 1846; Colombella veleda Duclos, 1846 superseded combination

= Anachis veleda =

Species of gastropod

Anachis veleda is a species of sea snail in the family Columbellidae, the dove snails.

== Description ==
The length of the shell attains 14.6 mm.

== Distribution ==
This species is found in the Atlantic Ocean off Brazil.
