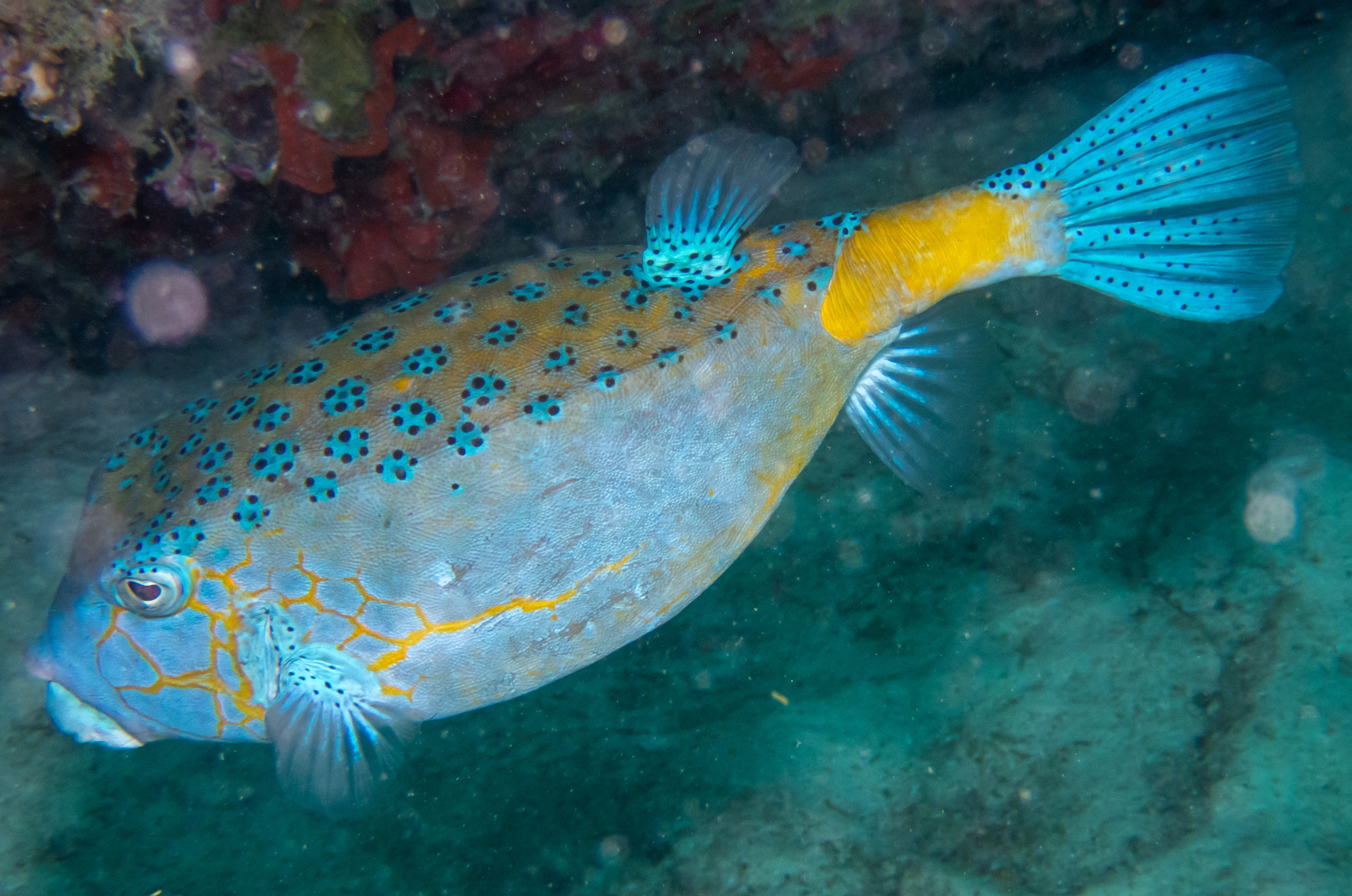
- In Malaysia

Conservation status
- Least Concern (IUCN 3.1)

Scientific classification
- Kingdom: Animalia
- Phylum: Chordata
- Class: Actinopterygii
- Division: Teleostei
- Order: Tetraodontiformes
- Family: Ostraciidae
- Genus: Ostracion
- Species: O. cubicum

Binomial name
- Ostracion cubicum Linnaeus, 1758

Synonyms
- Ostracion tuberculatus Linnaeus, 1758; Ostracion argus Rüppel, 1828

= Yellow boxfish =

Species of fish

The yellow boxfish (Ostracion cubicum) is a species of marine ray-finned fish belonging to the family Ostraciidae, the boxfishes. This species is found in reefs throughout the Pacific Ocean and Indian Ocean as well as the southeastern Atlantic Ocean, although since 2011 it has also been occasionally recorded in the Levantine waters of the Mediterranean Sea which it likely entered via the Suez Canal. The species is present in the aquarium trade. They are known for their cuboid body shape, bright yellow and black spotted coloration, and the secretion of a toxic mucus when threatened.

== Taxonomy ==
The yellow boxfish was first formally described by Carl Linnaeus in the 10th edition of Systema Naturae published in 1758 with its type locality given as India.

The classification of O. cubicum was at first debated. Carl Linnaeus used both the names O. cubicum and O. tuberculatum in order to describe the yellow boxfish. Because of the scarcity of comprehensive descriptions of the fish in Linnaeus' work, it was unclear if these two names were to classify different species. Albert Gunther was the first to resolve this debate, concluding that they were one species as it was difficult to distinguish the two. He placed O. cubicum as the valid species name and O. tuberculatum in synonymy.

This species is the type species of the genus Ostracion, which the 5th edition of Fishes of the World classifies within the family Ostraciidae in the suborder Ostracioidea within the order Tetraodontiformes. The family Ostraciidae includes fish known for their boxy shape, like cowfishes and trunkfishes.

=== Etymology ===
The yellow boxfish is the type species of the genus Ostracion, this name means "little box" and is an allusion to the shape of the body of the species. The specific name, cubicum means "cubic" and is a reference to the box-like shape of this fish.

== Description ==
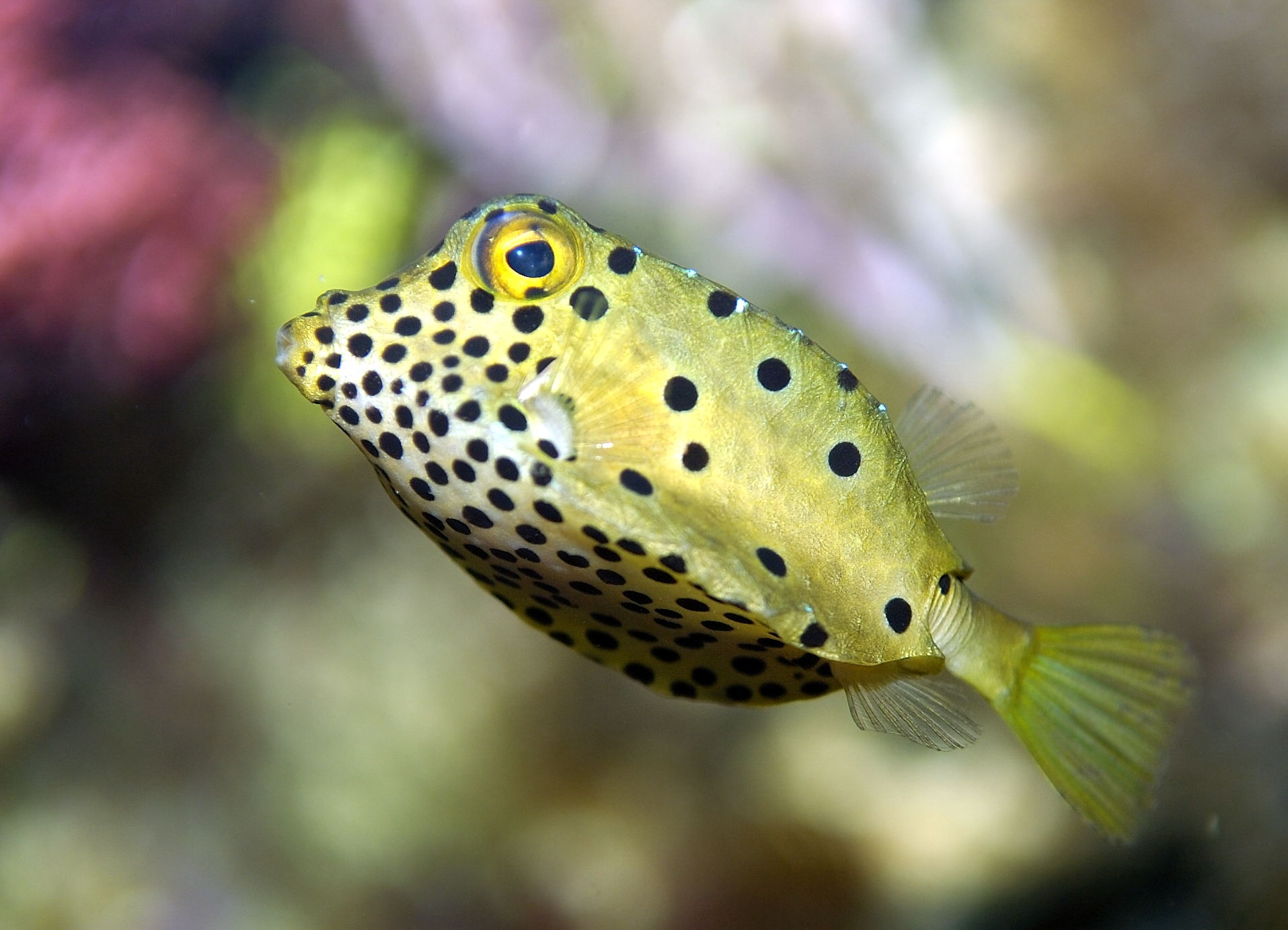
Juvenile

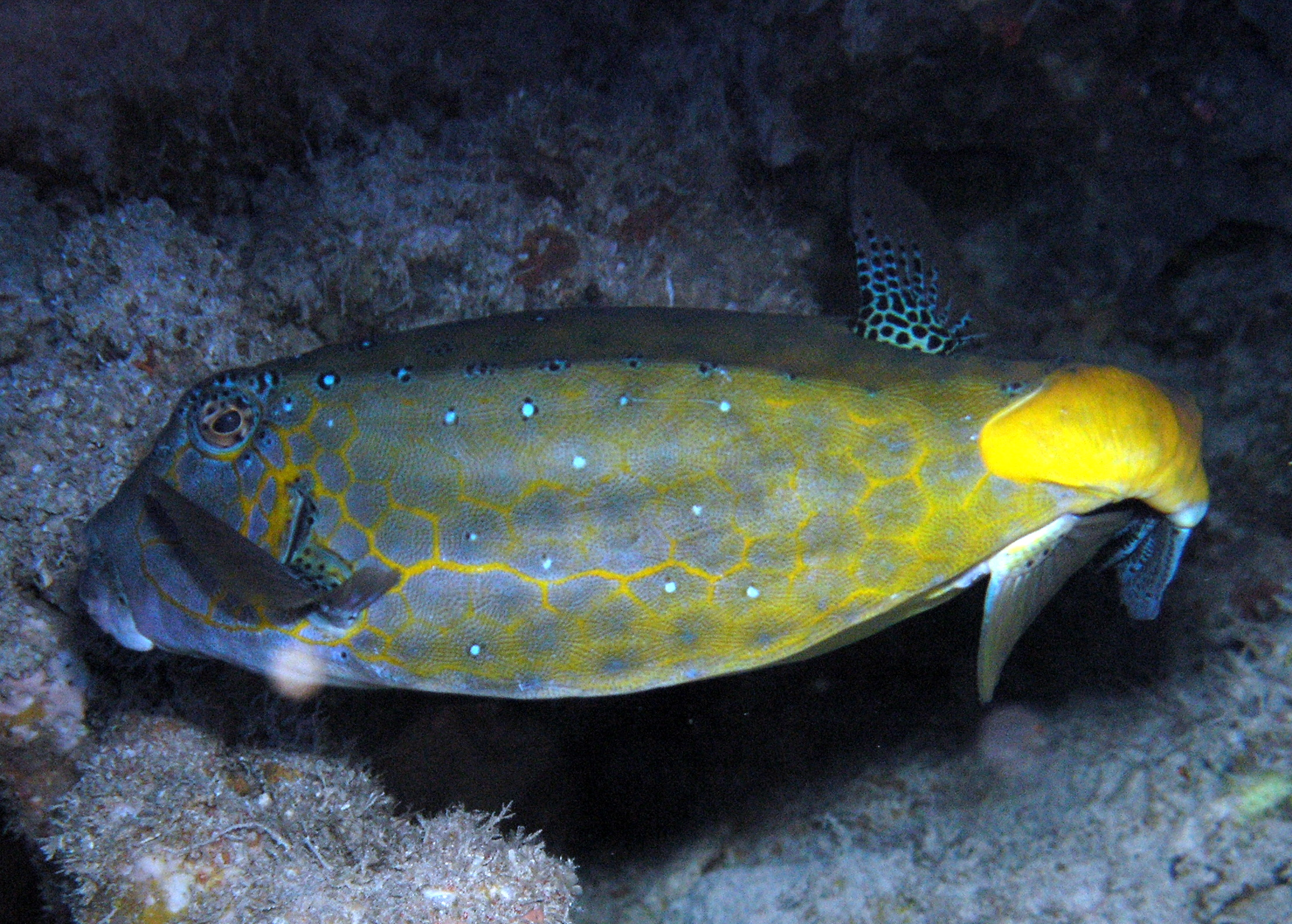
Adult

The yellow boxfish reaches a maximum length of 45 centimetres (18 in). As the name suggests, it is box-shaped. Boxfish are also known for their armored and rigid body called a carapace, covering the head and body. There are openings in the carapace for the mouth, nostrils, gill opening, anus, caudal peduncle, and fins. The rigid body shape provided by the carapace surrounding the body was thought to help the fish stabilize while swimming as the water flows over the body. It was thought to keep them on course in high-flow, turbulent conditions. However, the carapace was found to have little effect on stability. In fact, it was destabilizing, as it increased drag. Instead, the caudal fin is the stabilizing force and acts as a rudder.

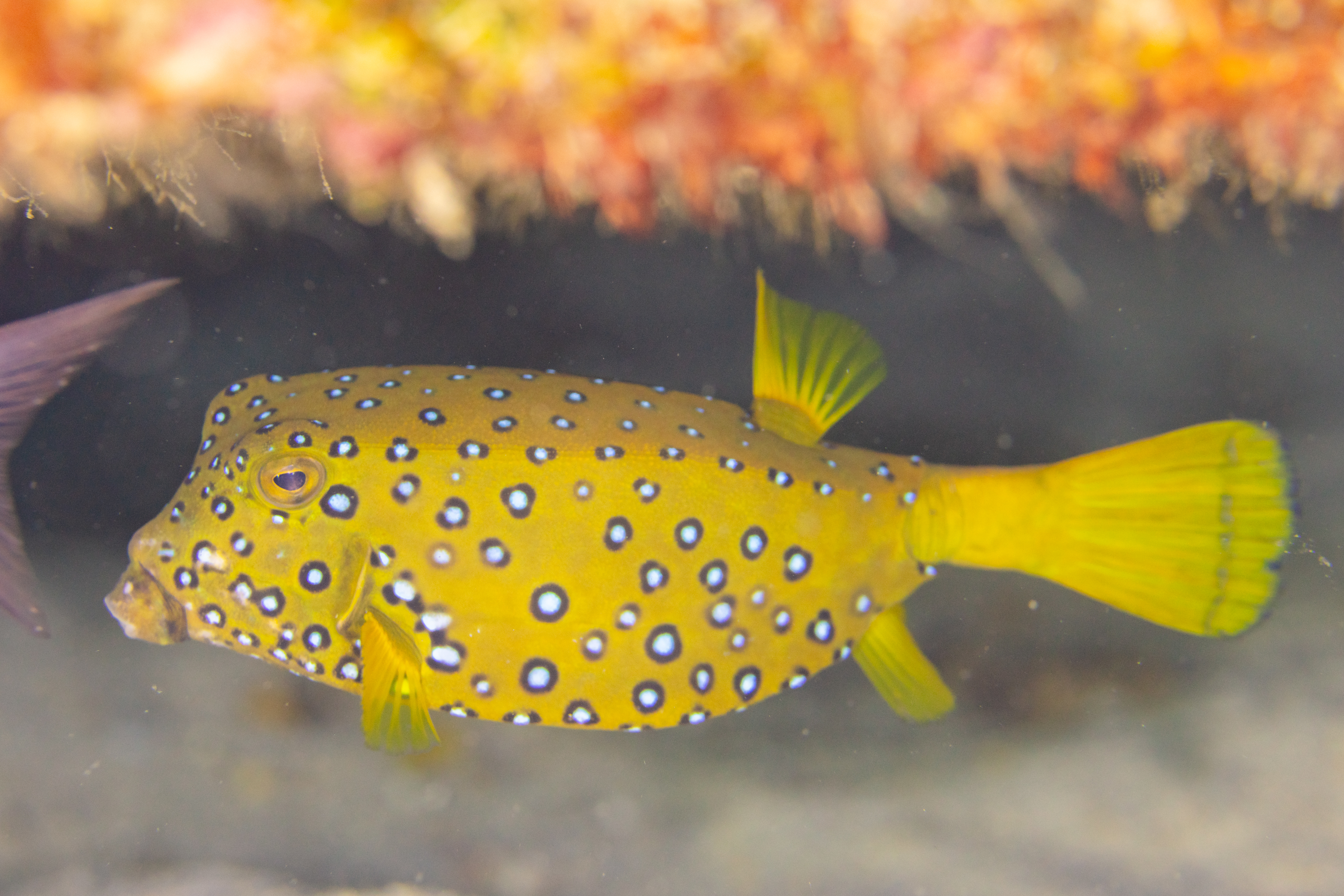
In Mauritius

Despite having a stiff and rigid covering, the yellow boxfish are strong and swift swimmers. They are able to swim steadily for long periods and they are able to maneuver in complex reefs. It was thought that boxfish swam with burst movements and by sculling their fins like an oar of a boat. However, they use a combination of movements with their dorsal, anal, and pectoral fins. The dorsal and anal fins move stiffly either simultaneously or non-simultaneously. It is with these fins they can reach maximum speeds. The pectoral fins provide thrust, moving in a figure-eight motion. At low speeds, the fish rely primarily on their pectoral and anal fins. At more moderate and faster speeds, this transitions to dorsal and caudal fin dominant.

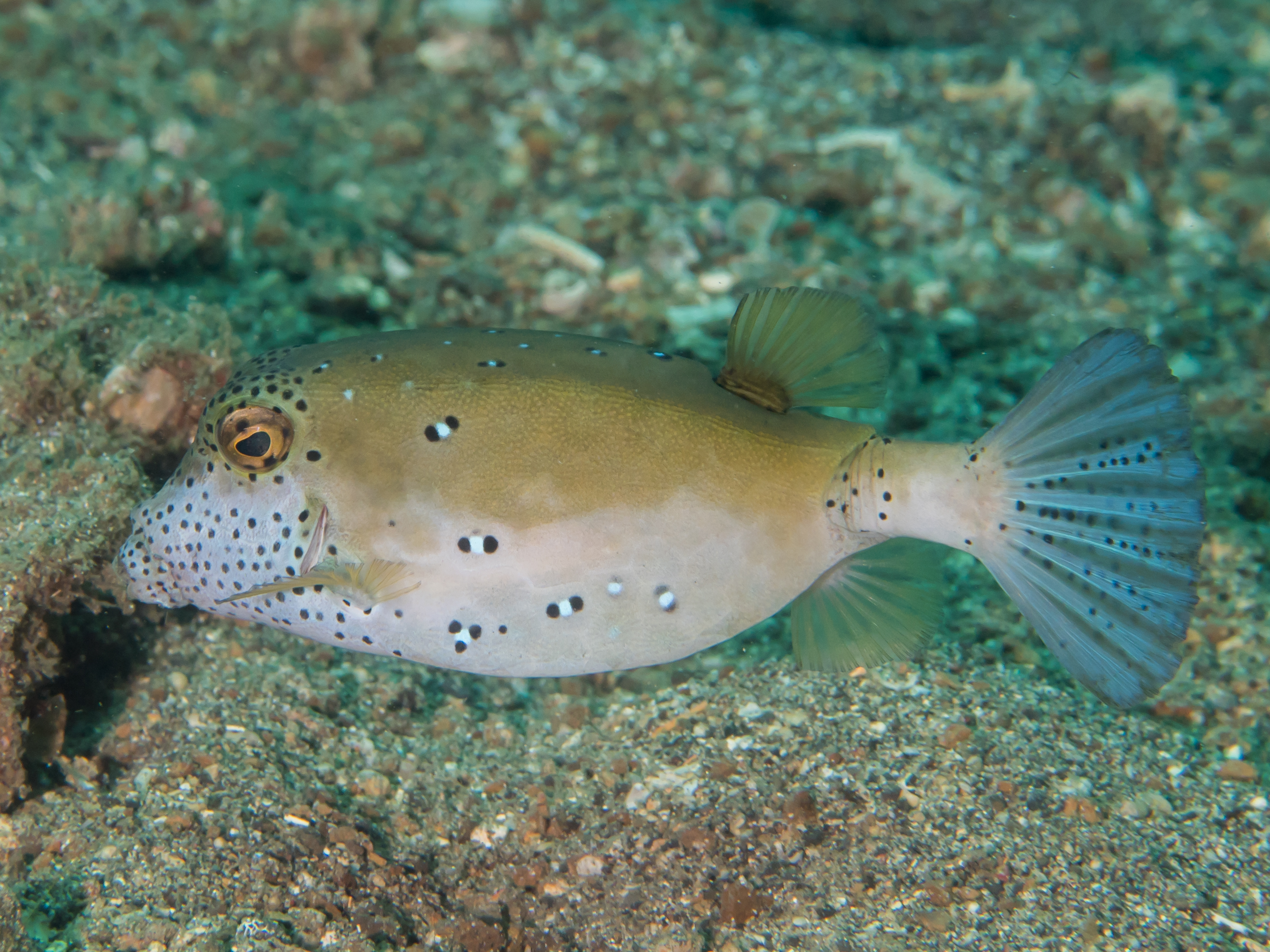
In Indonesia

Additionally, boxfish have a keel that aid them in swimming. A keel is a ridge near the caudal peduncle, aiding in support and stability. For the boxfish, its keel helps with stabilization against roll.

When juvenile, it is bright yellow in color. As it ages, the brightness fades and very old specimens have blue-grey to black coloration with faded yellow.

Yellow boxfish are solitary animals. Breeding occurs during the spring, in small groups that consist of 1 male and 2–4 females.

The yellow boxfish could be confused with the spotted boxfish (Ostracion meleagris). They both have the same box-like shape and spots all around their body. However, the major differences between the two is their coloring. The yellow boxfish is mainly a bright yellow color with dark spots while the spotted boxfish is darker with white spots.

== Distribution and habitat ==
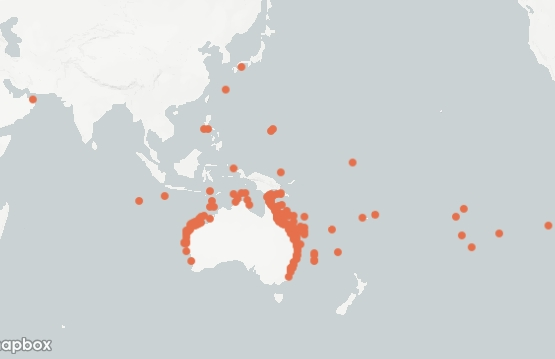
Yellow boxfish sightings in Australia - From Atlas of Living Australia

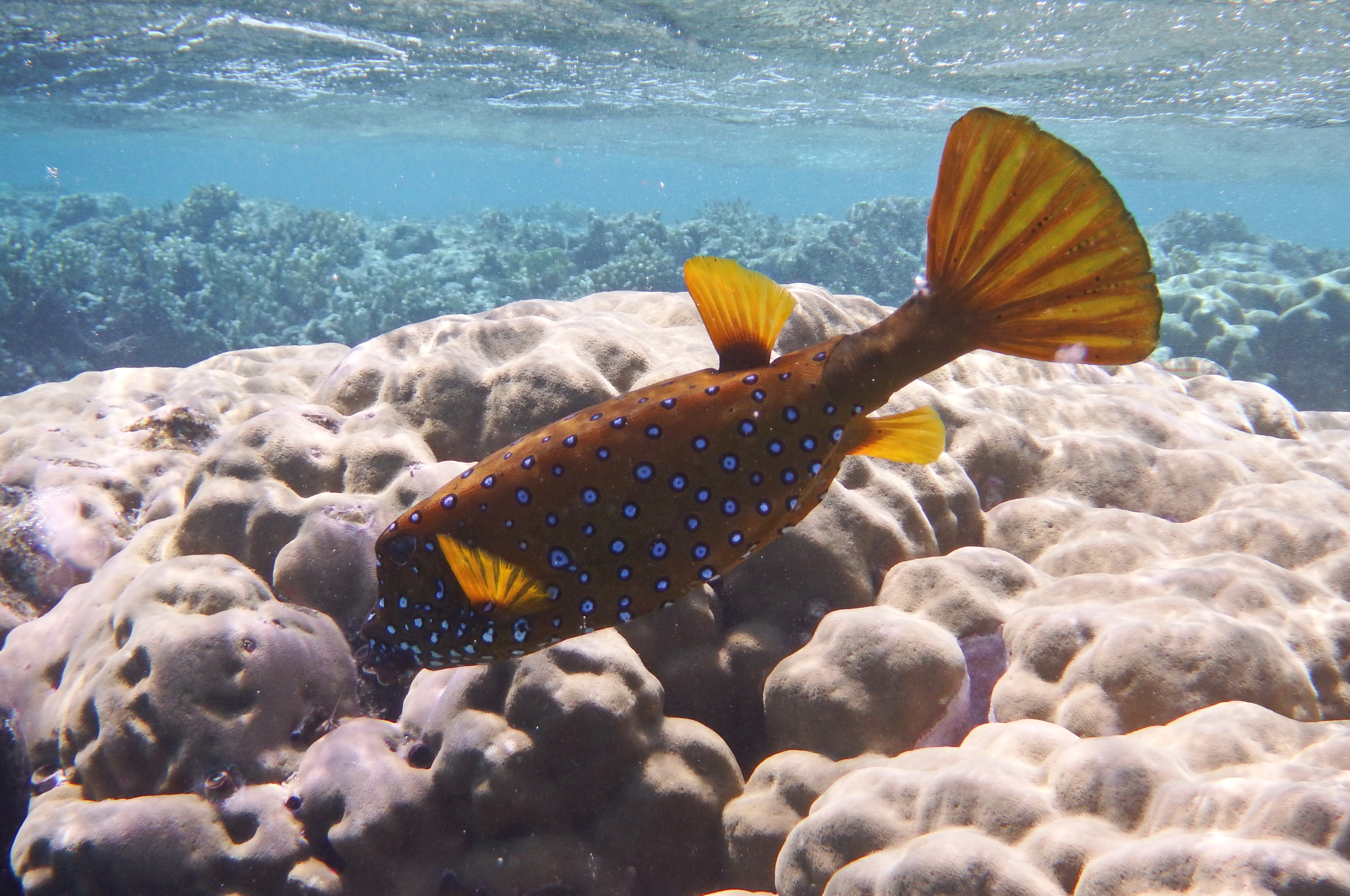
In the Red Sea

The yellow boxfish has a wide Indo-Pacific distribution which extends from the Red Sea and the eastern coast of Africa as far south as South Africa east to Hawaii, north to Japan and south to northern New Zealand. It has been recorded in the eastern Mediterranean Sea, probably having travelled through the Suez Canal. This species is found at depths between 1 and 75 m (3 ft 3 in and 246 ft 1 in) on sheltered coastal and offshore coral reefs and in areas of flat seabed. They are adapted to be able to maneuver through the channels and crevices of coral reefs, as well as consume the benthic invertebrates that also live in the reefs.

== Diet ==
The yellow boxfish's diet consists mainly of benthic organisms and marine algae. Their diets may also include worms, sponges, crustaceans, molluscs, and small fish.

== Defense mechanisms ==
The yellow boxfish is able to secrete the neurotoxin ostracitoxin as mucus when stressed. Ostracitoxin is highly toxic to marine fishes and is hemolytic agglutinating, meaning the red blood cells of fish are broken down and clump together. Surrounding fishes may be killed when exposed to this neurotoxin.

The yellow boxfish has a symbiotic relationship with the bacterium Vibrio parahaemolyticus, which was found in the toxic mucus that the fish secrete when stressed. It is thought that this bacterium plays a role in yellow boxfish defense mechanisms.

The bright yellow color and black spots are a form of warning coloration (aposematism) to any potential predators. In juveniles, the bright warning coloration is brighter, thought to have evolved as an early defense mechanism to deter predators.

== Swimming mechanics ==
It may be assumed that because of the yellow boxfish shape, that they are weak swimmers. However, living in coral reef habitats require great maneuverability and agility. The yellow boxfish are surprisingly very strong swimmers because of their morphology and physiology. The cuboid shape of the boxfish creates flow patterns and forms vortices which are swirling patterns in water. These patterns enable the fish to steer and navigate through reefs and away from predators. Their pectoral and anal fins play a large role in maintaining balance and enabling the yellow boxfish to make sharp turns. Their morphology makes them hydrodynamic and the inspiration for many engineering projects and potentially future underwater vehicles.

== Communication ==
The yellow boxfish is able to produce sounds. They are able to produce hums and clicking noises using the muscles of the swim bladder. It was found that O. meleagris was also able to produce sounds, however the yellow boxfish is able to produce louder and more click sounds. Males have a longer call duration than females and juveniles. It is thought that the purpose of the hum and click sounds are to either communicate with members of the same species or to deter predators.

== Conservation ==
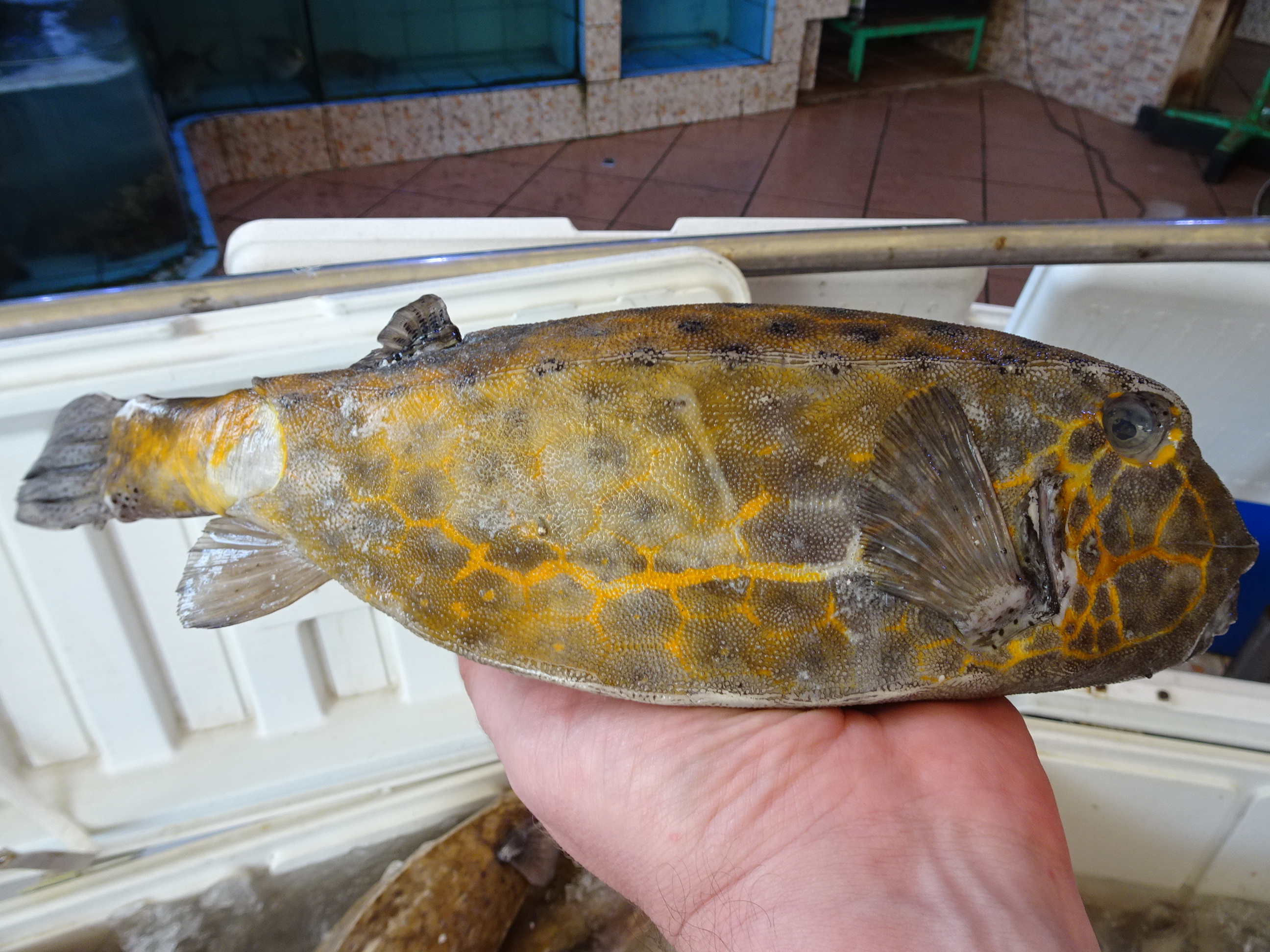
Being sold in a restaurant in Jakarta

The yellow boxfish is listed as Least Concern according to the IUCN Red List.

In the Gulf of Aqaba, it was found that there were wild fish aggregations around gilt-head seabream farms. Most of these wild fish were reef fish, which includes the yellow boxfish. The abundance of wild fish was greater at the farm cages than in the open ocean. While fish farms can be advantageous for wild fish as they are able to eat the excess organic matter from the farms, it may be a conservation issue for the yellow boxfish. Fish farms experience escapes, which could lead to the spread of disease to the wild fish aggregating there. Additionally, with the influx of reef fishes at these farms, it could attract ecotourism and agrotourism. These are all threats to the yellow boxfish.

== As a model for engineering ==
In 2006, Mercedes-Benz unveiled its Bionic concept car, which was inspired by the shape of the yellow boxfish. It was assumed that due to the extreme agility with which boxfish maneuver, that their shape was aerodynamic and self-stabilizing. However, analysis by scientists suggests that boxfish agility is instead due to the combination of an aerodynamically unstable body and the manner in which the fish use their fins for movement.

Box girders were also modeled after the yellow boxfish. Box girders are involved with the structure of bridges. Engineers found that yellow boxfish have very sturdy skeletons, and a shape that has low-flow resistance. They used this structure in order to reduce drag of box girders. The box girders are similar to the box-like body shape and they also incorporate the yellow boxfish mouth. The mouth of the yellow boxfish is the structure that is associated with it low-flow resistance.

Engineers used the boxfish carapace and shape to design an airship with higher maneuverability, stability, and overall flight. While it was thought that the boxfish's morphology was inefficient in movement, it is quite the opposite. The yellow boxfish is inspiring many engineers to improve steering and movement with its shape.
