= Nasus =

Nasus coming from Nasus Externus in Latin meaning nostril, is the designated term for nose on fishes.

== Biology ==
=== Medicine ===
- Nasus externus, the external nose.
- Auris Nasus Larynx, a medical journal ("Ear Nose Throat")

=== Zoology ===
==== Fish species ====
- Gogonasus, a Devonian fish and link to early tetrapods
- Barbus nasus, a Cyprinid fish
- Bassozetus nasus, a cusk-eel
- Chondrostoma nasus, nase
- Coilia nasus, an anchovy
- Coregonus nasus, broad whitefish
- Lamna nasus, porbeagle, a shark
- Menticirrhus nasus, highfin king croaker, (see kingcroaker)
- Nematalosa nasus, Bloch's gizzard shad (see Clupeidae)
- Ostracion nasus, shortnose boxfish (see boxfish)
- Parodon nasus (syn: Parodon tortuosus), freshwater fish (see Characidae)
- Typhlonus nasus, a cusk-eel (see Ophidiidae)
- Xenotilapia nasus, a Cichlid

==== Other species ====
- Brookesia nasus, a small chameleon
- Conopsis nasus, a snake
- Hylodes nasus, Santa Catarina Tree Toad, (synonyms include: Hyla nasus, Elosia nasuta, Elosia nasus, Enydrobius nasus, Elosia nasus nasus)

==== Morphology ====
- Nasus or fontanellar gun, the hornlike frontal projection of some termites

== Other uses ==
=== Fictional characters ===
- Nasus, the Curator of the Sands, a playable champion character in the multiplayer online battle arena video game League of Legends

=== Geography ===
- Nasus (Greece), a town of ancient Acarnania, Greece
