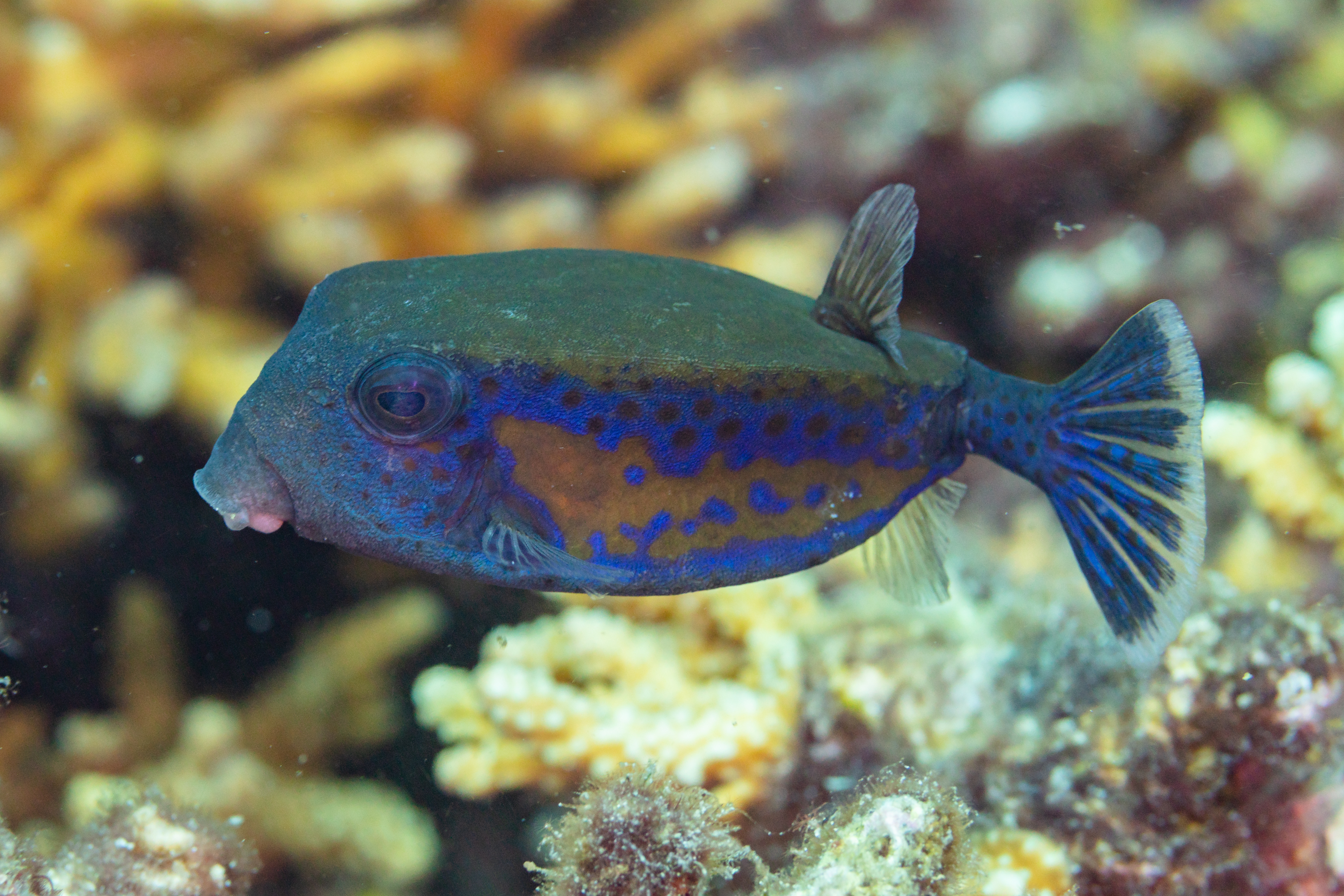
- male
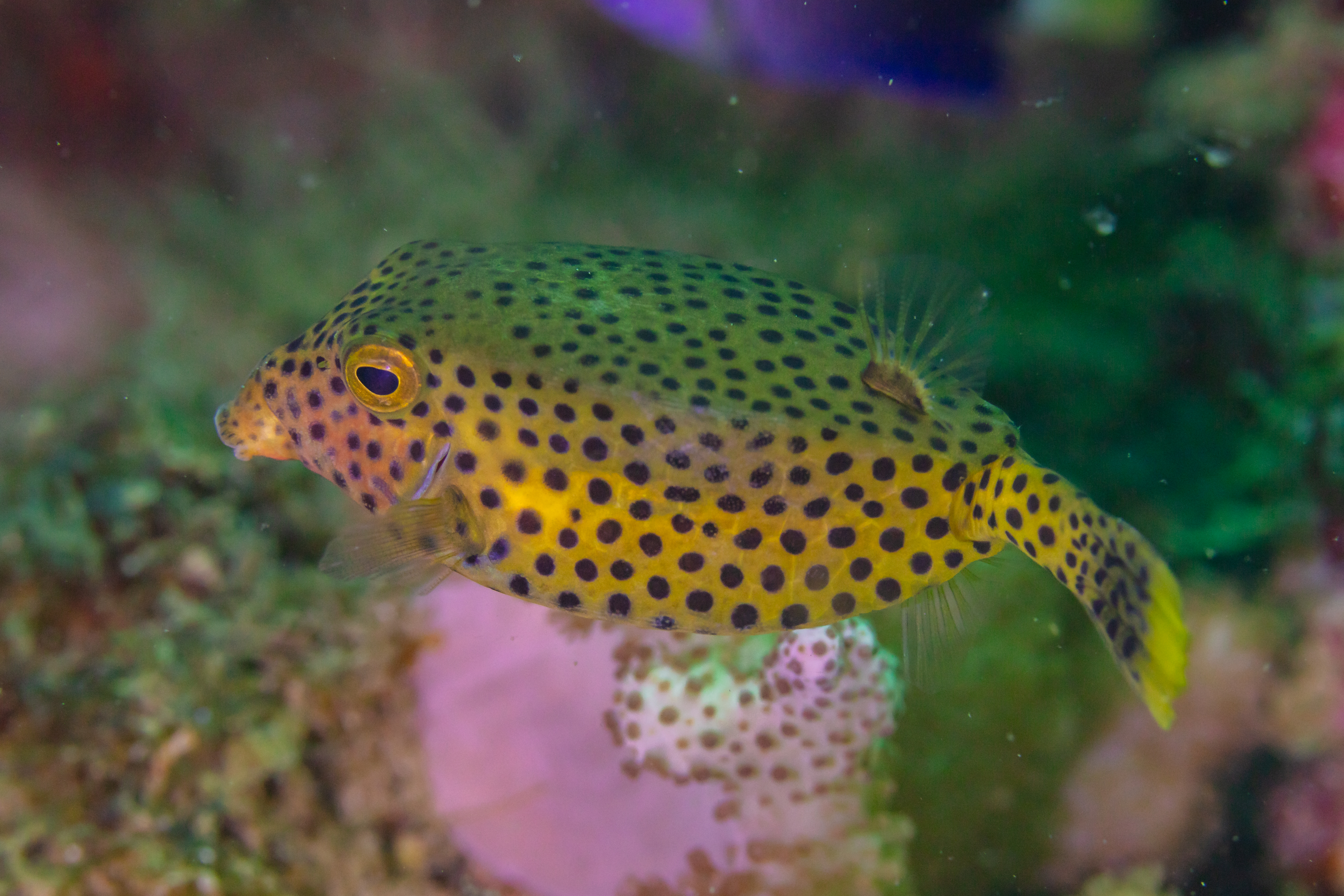
- Female

Conservation status
- Least Concern (IUCN 3.1)

Scientific classification
- Kingdom: Animalia
- Phylum: Chordata
- Class: Actinopterygii
- Order: Tetraodontiformes
- Family: Ostraciidae
- Genus: Ostracion
- Species: O. cyanurus

Binomial name
- Ostracion cyanurus Rüppell, 1828

= Ostracion cyanurus =

Species of fish

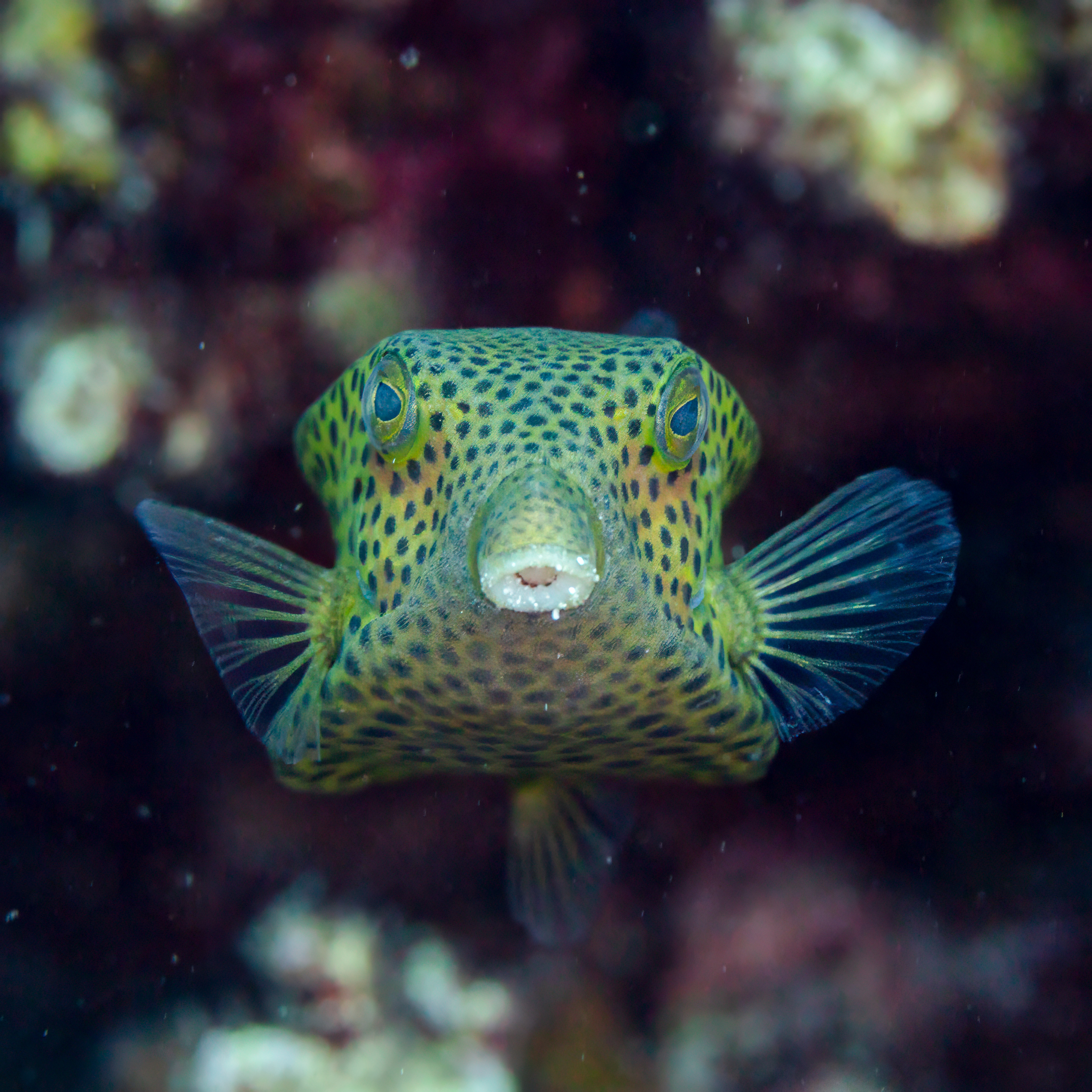
Front view of female boxfish, in the Ad Dimaniyat Islands, Oman

Ostracion cyanurus, the bluetail trunkfish, Arabian trunkfish or Red Sea boxfish, is a species of marine ray-finned fish belonging to the family Ostraciidae, the boxfishes. This species is found in the Western Indian Ocean.

== Taxonomy ==
Ostracion cyanurus was first formally described in 1828 by the German naturalist and explorer Eduard Rüppell with its type locality given as the Red Sea off Al Muwaylih in Tabuk Province, Saudi Arabia. The bluetail trunkfish is classified in the genus Ostracion which the 5th edition of Fishes of the World classifies within the family Ostraciidae in the suborder Ostracioidea within the order Tetraodontiformes.

== Etymology ==
Ostracion cyanurus is classified in the genus Ostracion, this name means "little box" and is an allusion to the shape of the body of its type species, O. cubicum. The specific name, cyanurus means "blue tail" and is a reference to the blue caudal fin of this fish. Ostracion is neuter so it has been argued that the specific name should be spelt as cyanurum.

== Description ==
Ostracion cyanurus has a maximum published total length of 15 cm (5.9 in). There are 9 soft rays on both the dorsal and anal fin, and 10 in the caudal fin, with 8 branched. Females have a slightly concave dorsal profile of the head while that of males is convex. The lips and chin are fleshy and stick out. The adult males are normally dark blue on the flanks and lower body with spots and an unspotted greenish-yellow upper body. Females are yellow with blue spots and red cheeks.

== Distribution and habitat ==
Ostracion cyanurus is found in the Western Indian Ocean where it occurs in the Red Sea and around the Arabian Peninsula into the Persian Gulf as far east as eastern Iran. This species is found in areas where there is a moderate growth of coral at depths between 5 and 50 m (16 and 164 ft).

== Biology ==
Ostracion cyanurus is a solitary species which remains in the vicinity of shelter. The apparent lack of smaller males may mean that this species is protogynous. If the bluetail trunkfish senses danger is releases a toxin called pahutoxin, or ostracotoxin, into the water as a defence.

== Human uses ==
Ostracion cyanurus is available in the aquarium trade.
