= Paracanthostracion =

Scientific classification
- Kingdom: Animalia
- Phylum: Chordata
- Class: Actinopterygii
- Order: Tetraodontiformes
- Family: Ostraciidae
- Genus: Paracanthostracion; Whitley, 1933
- Species: P. lindsayi

Binomial name
- Paracanthostracion lindsayi (Phillipps, 1932)

Synonyms
- Ostracion lindsayi Phillipps, 1932; Paracanthostracion lindsayi levior Whitley, 1933

Monotypic genus of fish

Paracanthostracion is a monospecific genus of marine ray-finned fish belonging to the family Ostraciidae, the boxfishes. The only species in the genus is Paracanthostracion lindsayi, Lindsay's boxfish, which is found in the Southwestern Pacific Ocean.

== Taxonomy ==
Paracanthostracion was first proposed as a genus in 1933 by the British-born Australian ichthyologist Gilbert Percy Whitley with Ostracion lindsayi designated as its type species, and its only species. O. lindsayi was first formally described in 1932 by the New Zealand ichthyologist William J. Phillipps with its type locality given as Otago, New Zealand. This taxon is classified within the family Ostraciidae in the 5th edition of Fishes of the World, which it places in the suborder Ostracioidea within the order Tetraodontiformes.

== Etymology ==
Paracanthostracion prefixes para-, meaning "close to", to the genus name Acanthostracion from which it differs in the shape of its carapace and the distribution of its spines. The specific name honours Phillipps's colleague at the Dominion Museum in Wellington, the curator of technology and taxidermist Charles John Lindsay.

== Description ==
Paraacanthostracion is characterised by having the anterior profile of the head being oblique with the diameter of its eye being only slightly less than the length of the snout. The space between the eyes is clearly concave. The carapace is quadrangular in shape with a poorly developed ridge along the middle of the back. There is a forward pointing spine before each eye and large spine in the middle of the back with another large spine, directed rearwards along the edge of the carapace near the anal fin. The hexagonal plate-like scales that make up the carapace are very rough towards its rear, as well as on the head. The body is irregularly streaked and spotted with grey and there are spots on the cheeks which show a tendency to merge to form short streaks.

== Distribution ==
Paraacanthostracion is found in the Southwestern Pacific Ocean where it is known only from the waters around New Zealand.
