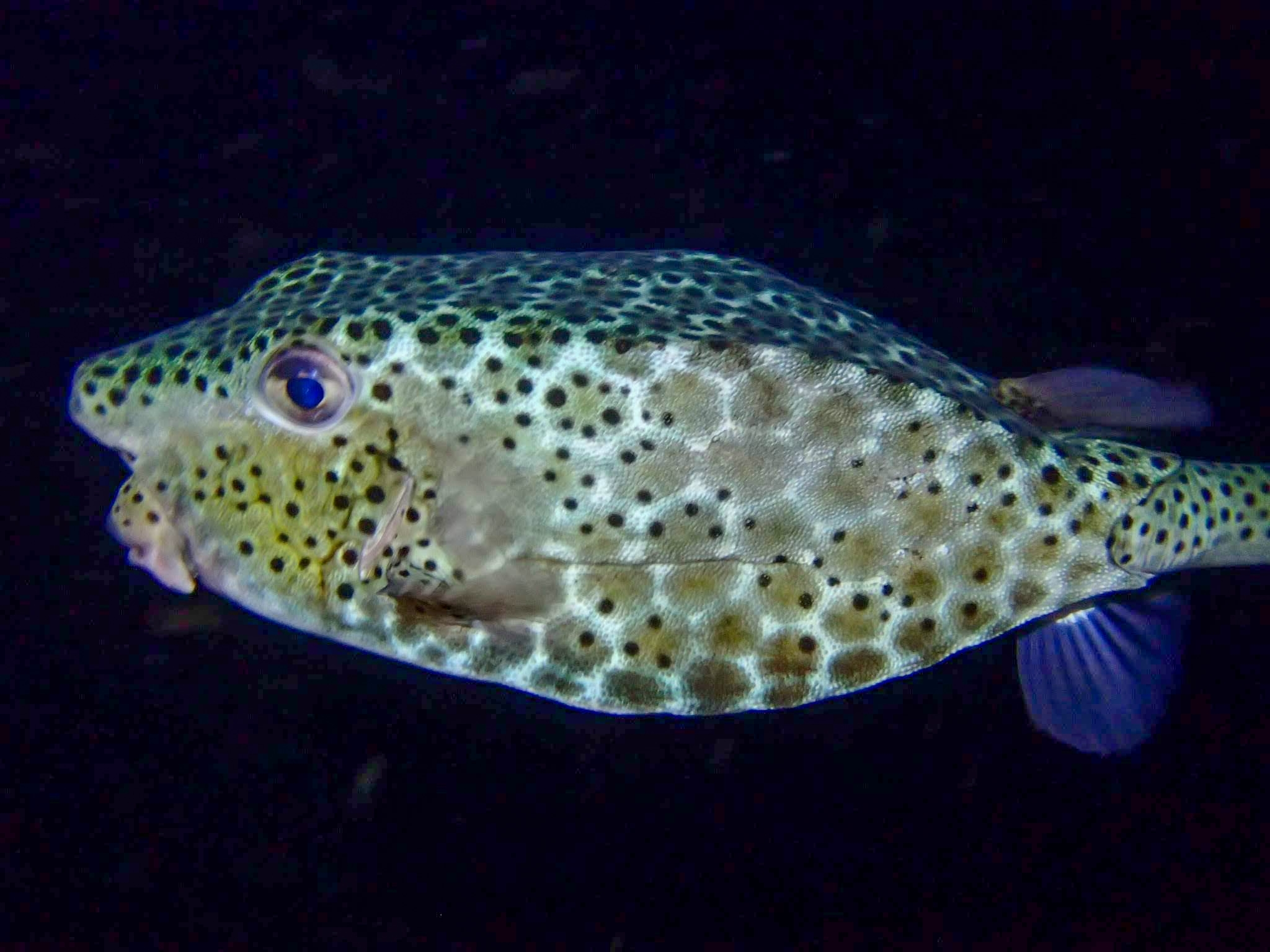

Conservation status
- Least Concern (IUCN 3.1)

Scientific classification
- Kingdom: Animalia
- Phylum: Chordata
- Class: Actinopterygii
- Order: Tetraodontiformes
- Family: Ostraciidae
- Genus: Ostracion
- Species: O. rhinorhynchos

Binomial name
- Ostracion rhinorhynchos Bleeker, 1851

Synonyms
- Rhynchostracion rhinorhynchos (Bleeker, 1851)

= Ostracion rhinorhynchos =

Species of fish

Ostracion rhinorhynchos, the horn-nosed boxfish or torpedo boxfish, is a species of ray-finned fish belonging to the family Ostraciidae, the boxfishes. This fish occurs in the Indo-West Pacific region.

== Taxonomy ==
Ostracion rhinorhynchos was first formally described in 1851 by the Dutch physician, herpetologist and ichthyologist Pieter Bleeker with its type locality given as Jakarta on Java. This species is classified in the genus Ostracion which the 5th edition of Fishes of the World classifies within the family Ostraciidae in the suborder Ostracioidea within the order Tetraodontiformes.

== Etymology ==
Ostracion rhinorhynchos is classified in the genus Ostracion, this name means "little box" and is an allusion to the shape of the body of its type species, O. cubicum. The specific name, rhinorhynchos is a compound of rhinos, meaning "beak" or "bill", with rhynchos, which means "snout", an allusion to the to cone-shaped protuberance on the snout of adults.

== Description ==
Ostracion rhinorhynchos has 9 soft rays supporting both the dorsal and anal fins while the caudal fin has 10 rays, 8 of which are branched. Males have a large, blunt, conical protuberance above the mouth and in front of the eyes. The oblong carapace has a poorly developed ridge on the back with sharp ridges on the lower flank, although there are no spines. The upper body is pale grey and may be spotted, spotting is more prominent on the caudal peduncle and less clear on the flanks. The lower body is white and the fins are dusky. The horn-nosed boxfish has a maximum published total length of 35 cm (14 in).

== Distribution and habitat ==
Ostracion rhinorhynchos has a wide distribution in the Indian and Pacific Oceans. It occurs from the Maldives and Sri Lanka east to Chuuk State in Micronesia, north as far as southern Japan. It is found at depths between 1 and 50 m (3 ft 3 in and 164 ft 1 in) on substrates of rubble, as well as flat areas and on reefs.
