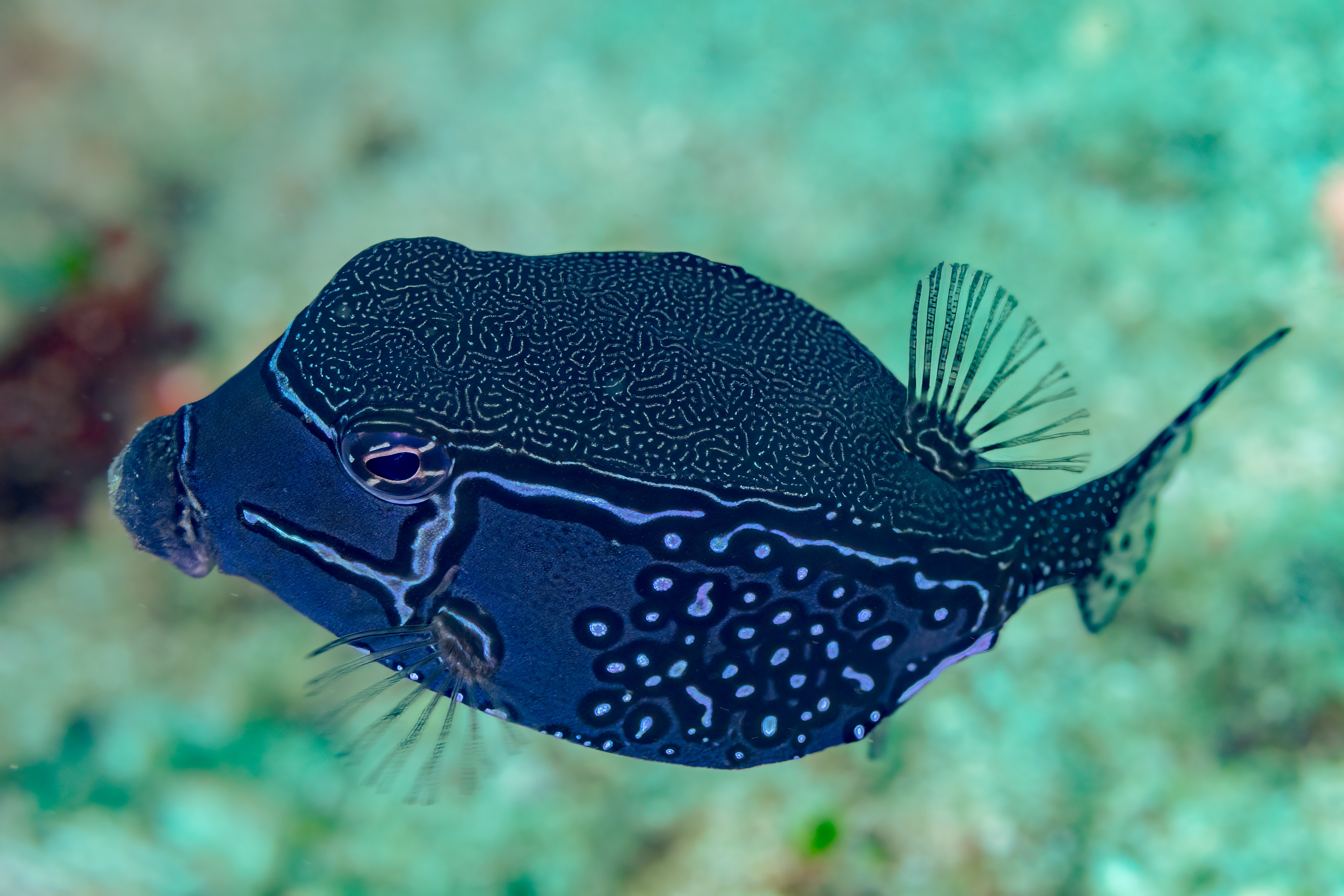
- Male
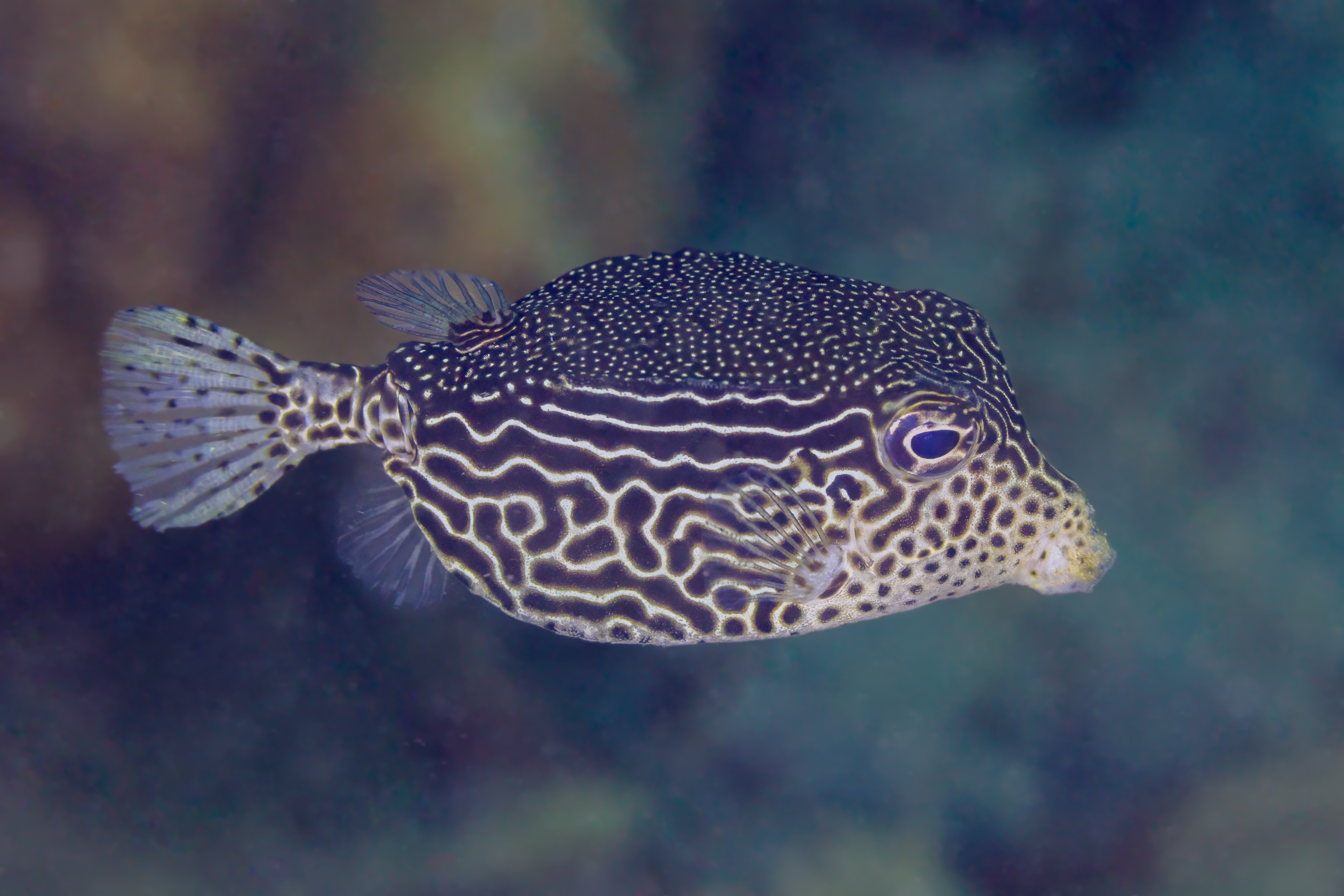
- Female; Both from Anilao, Philippines

Conservation status
- Least Concern (IUCN 3.1)

Scientific classification
- Kingdom: Animalia
- Phylum: Chordata
- Class: Actinopterygii
- Order: Tetraodontiformes
- Family: Ostraciidae
- Genus: Ostracion
- Species: O. solorense

Binomial name
- Ostracion solorense Bleeker, 1853

= Ostracion solorense =

Species of fish

Ostracion solorense, the reticulate boxfish, scribbled boxfish, Solor boxfish or striped boxfish, is a species of marine ray-finned fish belonging to the family Ostraciidae, the boxfishes. This species is found in the far eastern Indian Ocean and Western Pacific Ocean.

== Taxonomy ==
Ostracion solorense was first formally described in 1853 by the Dutch physician, herpetologist and ichthyologist Pieter Bleeker with its type locality given as Lawajong on Solor Island, Indonesia. This species is classified in the genus Ostracion which the 5th edition of Fishes of the World classifies within the family Ostraciidae in the suborder Ostracioidea within the order Tetraodontiformes.

== Etymology ==
Ostracion solorense is classified in the genus Ostracion, this name means "little box" and is an allusion to the shape of the body of its type species, O. cubicum. The specific name, solorense means "of Solor", the type locality.

== Description ==
Ostracion solorense has nine soft rays in both the dorsal and anal fins. The overall colour of the males varies from bluish-grey to blackish with thin light blue sinuous lines on the back, a wide dark stripe with paler wavy lines on the upper flank and white spots withnblack marginms along the flanks. The females have black lines on the upper body, the sides are yellowish to greenish brown with a network of black lines. There is a characteristic bony protuberance above the upper lip. This species has a maximum published total length of 12 cm (4.7 in).

== Distribution and habitat ==
Ostracion solorense is found in the eastern Indian Ocean at Rowley Shoals and Christmas Island and in the Pacific as far east as Palau and Fiji. The reticulate boxfish is found at depths between 1 and 20 m (3 ft 3 in and 65 ft 7 in) on coastal reefs in clear waters.
