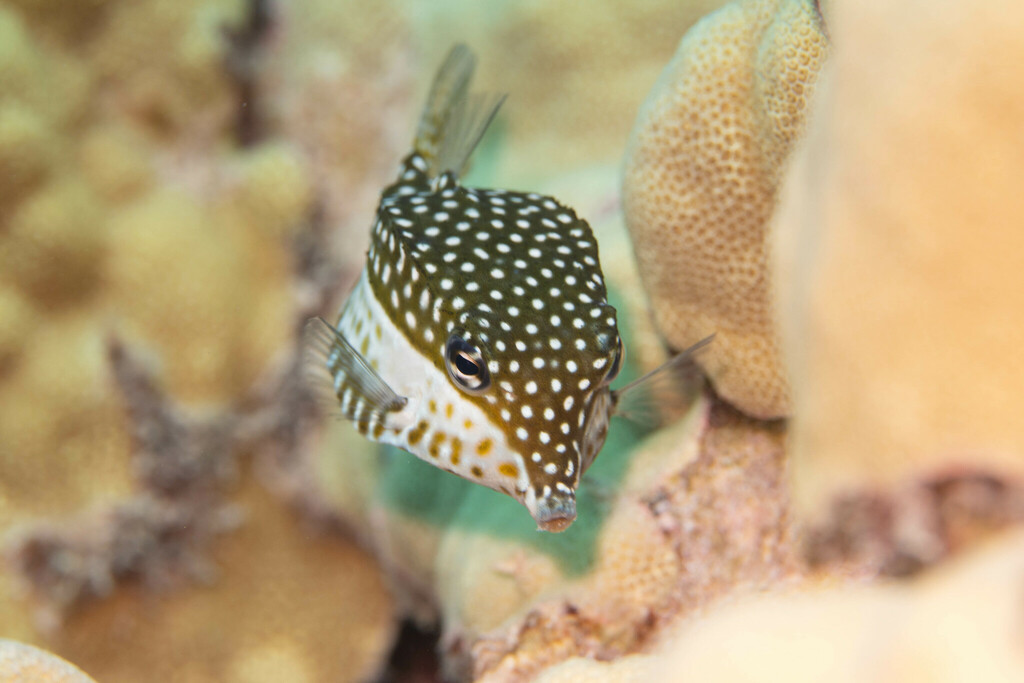
- Female Whiteley's boxfish Ostracion whitleyi Kailua-Kona, Hawaii
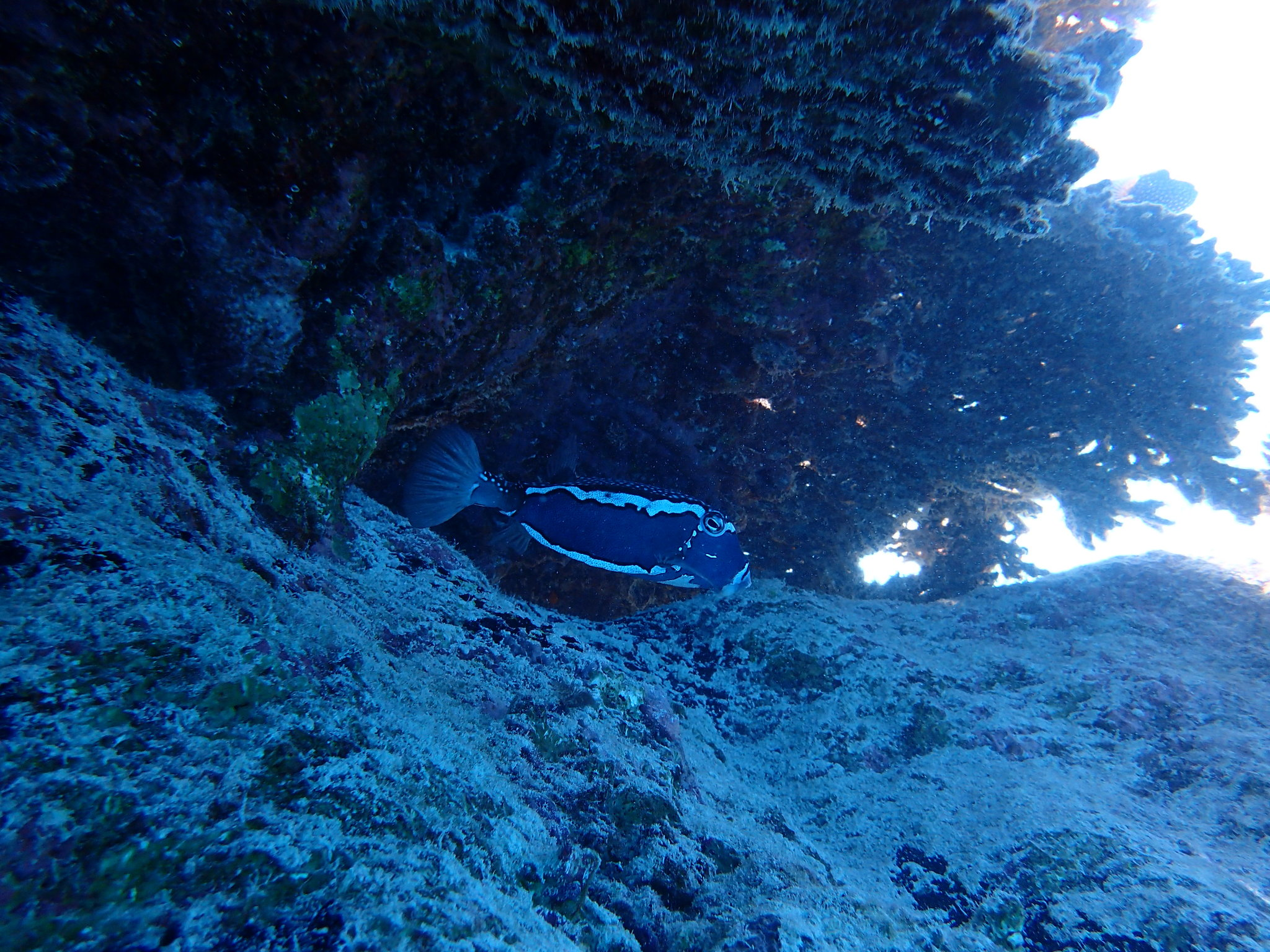
- male, Johnston Atoll

Conservation status
- Least Concern (IUCN 3.1)

Scientific classification
- Kingdom: Animalia
- Phylum: Chordata
- Class: Actinopterygii
- Order: Tetraodontiformes
- Family: Ostraciidae
- Genus: Ostracion
- Species: O. whitleyi

Binomial name
- Ostracion whitleyi Fowler, 1931

Synonyms
- Ostracion ornatus Hollard, 1857

= Whitley's boxfish =

Species of fish

Whitley's boxfish (Ostracion whitleyi) is a species of marine ray-finned fish belonging to the family Ostraciidae, the boxfishes. This fish is found in the Eastern Central Pacific Ocean.

== Taxonomy ==
Whitley's boxfish was first formally described in 1931 by the American zoologist Henry Weed Fowler with its type locality given as the Marquesas Islands. Fowler's name was a replaced ment for Ostracion ornatus proposed for this species by Henri Hollard in 1857 which was preoccupied by Ostracion (Aracana) ornata, a species described by John Edward Gray in 1838. This species is classified in the genus Ostracion which the 5th edition of Fishes of the World classifies within the family Ostraciidae in the suborder Ostracioidea within the order Tetraodontiformes.

== Etymology ==
Whitley's boxfish is classified in the genus Ostracion, this name means "little box" and is an allusion to the shape of the body of its type species, O. cubicum. The specific name honours the British-born Australian ichthyologist Gilbert Percy Whitley, Whitley drew Fowler's attention to the fact that Hollard's name needed to be replaced.

== Description ==
Whitley's Boxfish is sexually dimorphic, the males have a navy blue body marked with a pale blue lines along the upper and lower sides and a black dorsal surface marked with pale blue spots. The female is a golden yellow in colour marked with white spots and there is a white band running along the flank. This species has a maximum published total length of 15.5 cm (6.1 in).

== Distribution and habitat ==
Whitley's boxfish is found in the Eastern Central Pacific Ocean where it occurs in the Hawaiian Islands, Johnston Atoll, the Marquesas Silands and the Tuamotu Islands. It is found at depths between 3 and 27 m (9.8 and 88.6 ft) in clear lagoons and seaward reefs.
