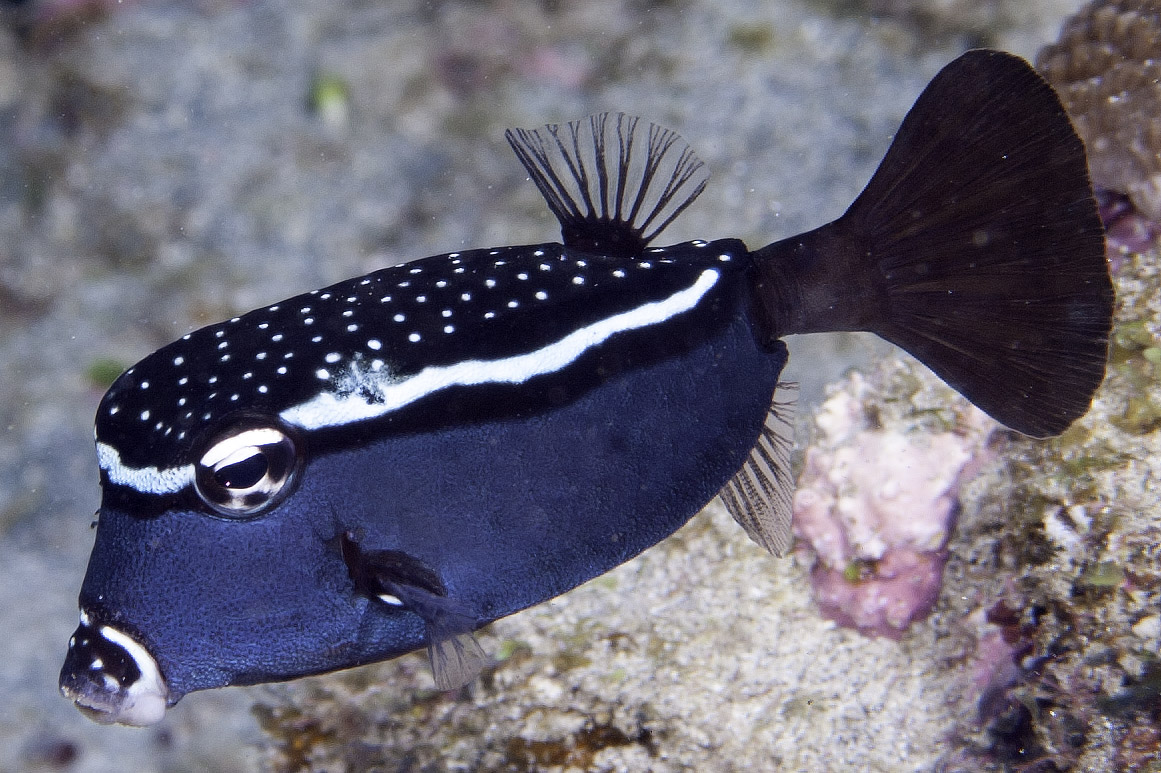
- Male
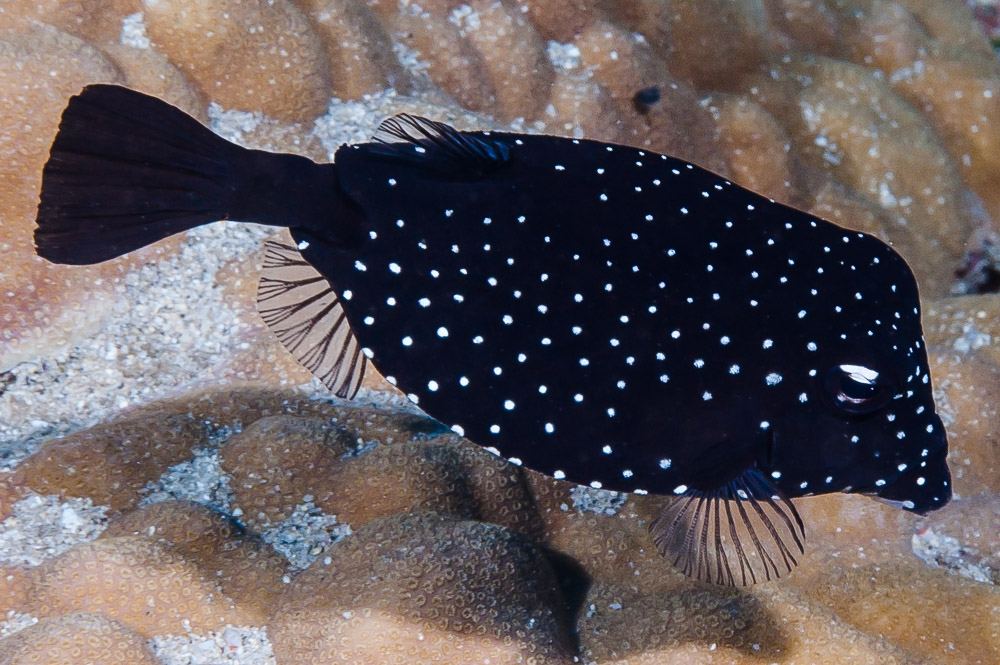
- Juvenile

Scientific classification
- Kingdom: Animalia
- Phylum: Chordata
- Class: Actinopterygii
- Order: Tetraodontiformes
- Family: Ostraciidae
- Genus: Ostracion
- Species: O. trachys

Binomial name
- Ostracion trachys Randall, 1975

= Ostracion trachys =

Species of fish

Ostracion trachys, the rough boxfish or roughskin trunkfish, is a species of marine ray-finned fish belonging to the family Ostraciidae, the boxfishes. It is found in the Western Indian Ocean around the Mascarenes.

== Taxonomy ==
Ostracion trachys was first formally described in 1975 by the American ichthyologist John Ernest Randall with its type locality given as a patch reef about 800 m (2,600 ft) northeast of Grand Baie on Mauritius. This species is classified in the genus Ostracion which the 5th edition of Fishes of the World classifies within the family Ostraciidae in the suborder Ostracioidea within the order Tetraodontiformes.

== Etymology ==
Ostracion trachys is classified in the genus Ostracion, this name means "little box" and is an allusion to the shape of the body of its type species, O. cubicum. The specific name, trachys means "rough", an allusion to the feel of the carapace, especially where the scales have a spinule at their centre.

== Description ==
Ostracion trachys has 9 soft rays in both the dorsal and anal fins, while the caudal fin has the lowermost and uppermost of its 10 rays being simple and the remaining 8 being branched. The caudal fin has a convex rear margin. The carapace is oblong in shape with convex dorsal and ventral surfaces and is concave at the sides. The plate-like scales that form the carapace are hexagonal in shape, with most of the plates, particularly to the rear of the body and on the back, having a spinule. The adult males are blackish on the upper body with small white spots which extend as far as the area between the eyes, where there is a white band with black margins. The snout and sides of the carapace are bluish grey broken by an obvious white stripe along the carapace's upper ridge. The caudal peduncle and the caudal fin are dark brown with a small number of white spots at the base of the caudal fin. The ventral surface of the body is bluish grey and a large white spot with a black margin at the gill slit. The upper lip is dark with a white margin and the lower lip is white. Females are dark brown to black with the back and sides of the carapace spotted with white spot. The underside is whitish with brown bands and yellow-margined brown spots. Juveniles are also dark brown to black with small circular white spots on the sides with a whitish ventral surface with small, indistinct dark spots. The rough boxfish has a maximum published total length of 11 cm (4.3 in).

== Distribution and habitat ==
Ostracion trachys is found in the Western Indian Ocean off the Mascarene ISlands of Mauritius and Réunion. It is a secretive species which lives at depths as 15 and 30 m (49 and 98 ft), hiding in holes and crevices in rocky reefs.
