= Gilloblennius =

Scientific classification
- Kingdom: Animalia
- Phylum: Chordata
- Class: Actinopterygii
- Division: Teleostei
- Order: Blenniiformes
- Family: Tripterygiidae
- Subfamily: Tripterygiinae
- Genus: Gilloblennius; Whitley & Phillipps, 1939

Type species
- Blennius tripennis Forster, 1801

Species
- See text.

Genus of fishes

Gilloblennius is a genus of triplefins in the family Tripterygiidae. The genus is endemic to New Zealand.

== Species ==
- Obscure triplefin, Gilloblennius abditus Hardy, 1986
- Thripenny, Gilloblennius tripennis (Forster, 1801)
