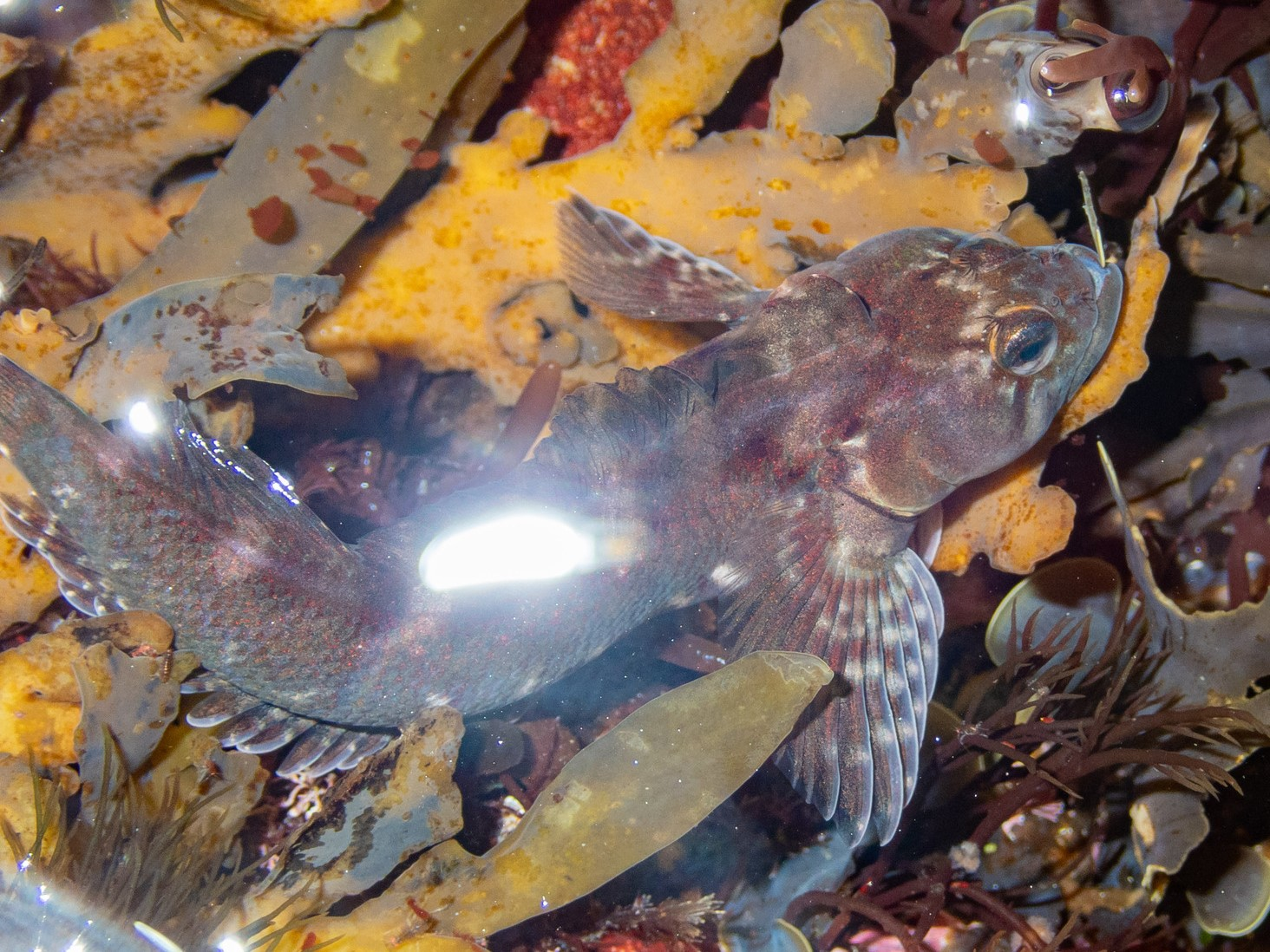

Conservation status
- Least Concern (IUCN 3.1)

Scientific classification
- Kingdom: Animalia
- Phylum: Chordata
- Class: Actinopterygii
- Order: Blenniiformes
- Family: Tripterygiidae
- Genus: Gilloblennius
- Species: G. abditus

Binomial name
- Gilloblennius abditus Hardy, 1986

= Obscure triplefin =

Species of fish

The obscure triplefin (Gilloblennius abditus) is a species of triplefin blenny in the family Tripterygiidae. It was described by Graham Stuart Hardy in 1896. It is endemic to New Zealand where it has a disjunct distribution around North and South Islands where there are highly exposed rocky coasts.
