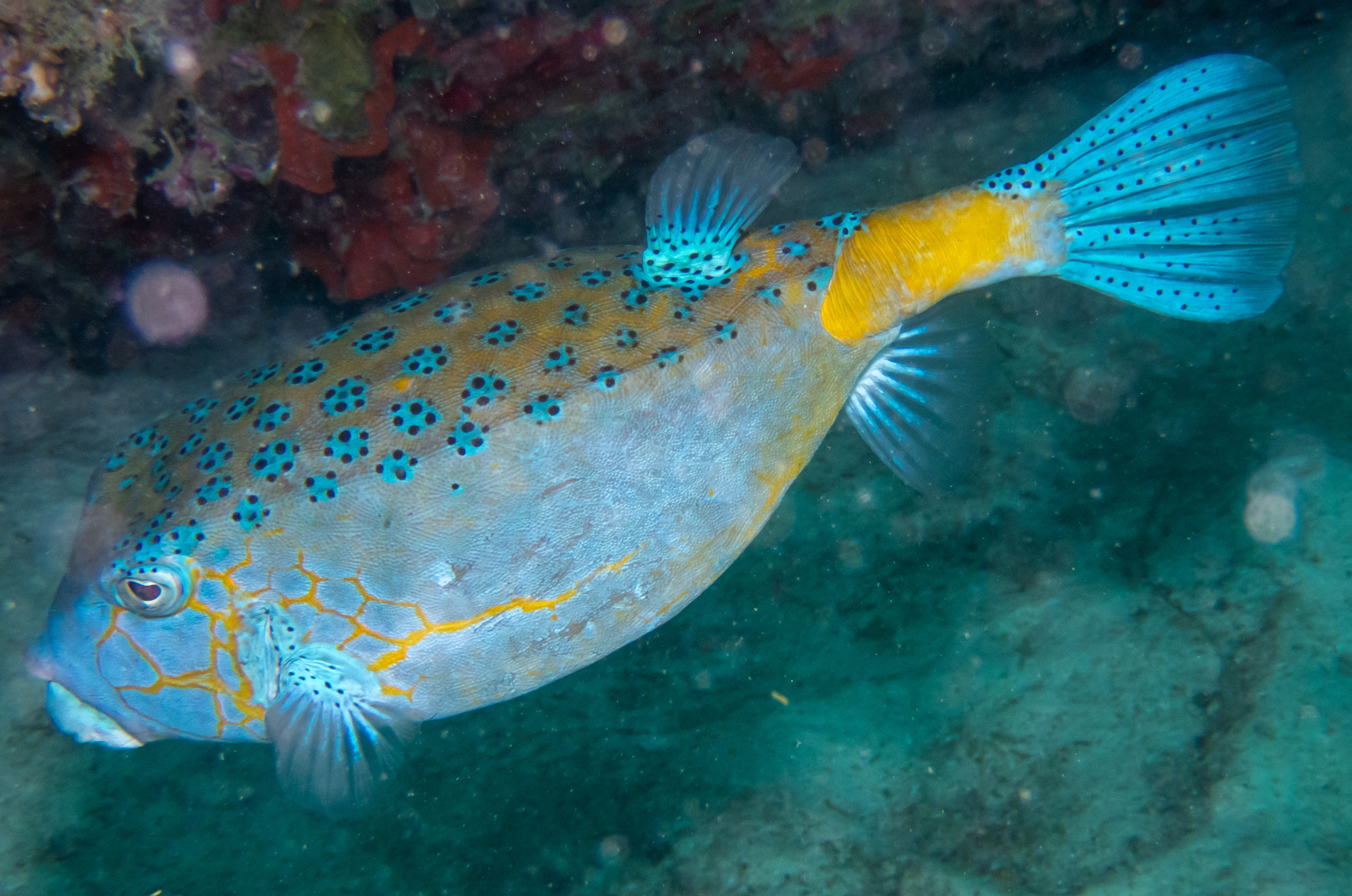
- Yellow boxfish (Ostracion cubicum)

Scientific classification
- Kingdom: Animalia
- Phylum: Chordata
- Class: Actinopterygii
- Division: Teleostei
- Order: Tetraodontiformes
- Superfamily: Ostracioidea
- Family: Ostraciidae; Rafinesque, 1810

Genera
- See text

= Ostraciidae =

Ostraciidae Temporal range: Eocene–Recent

Family of boxfishes

Ostraciidae or Ostraciontidae is a family of squared, bony fish belonging to the order Tetraodontiformes, closely related to the pufferfishes and filefishes. Fish in this family are also known as boxfishes, cofferfishes, cowfishes and trunkfishes. It contains about 23 extant species in 6 extant genera. Ostraciids occur in the Atlantic, Indian, and Pacific oceans.

== Taxonomy ==
Ostraciidae was first proposed as a family in 1810 by the French polymath Constantine Samuel Rafinesque. In the past this grouping was regarded as a subfamily, the Ostraciinae, along with the subfamily Aracaninae, of a wider Ostraciidae. However, recent phylogenetic studies have concluded that the families Aracanidae and Ostraciidae are valid families but that they are part of the same clade, the suborder Ostracioidei. The 5th edition of Fishes of the World classifies this clade as the suborder Ostracioidea within the order Tetraodontiformes.

== Etymology ==
Ostraciidae takes its name from its type genus, Ostracion, a name which means "little box" and is an allusion to the shape of the body of its type species, O. cubicus.

== Description ==
Ostraciidae boxfishes occur in a variety of colors, and are noted for the hexagonal or "honeycomb" patterns on their skin. They swim in a rowing manner. Their hexagonal plate-like scales are fused into a solid, triangular or box-like carapace, from which the fins, tail, eyes and mouth protrude. Because of these heavy armoured scales, Ostraciidae are limited to slow movements, but few other fish are able to eat the adults. Ostraciid boxfish of the genus Lactophrys also secrete poisons from their skin into the surrounding water, further protecting them from predation. Although the adults are in general quite square in shape, young Ostraciidae are more rounded. The young often exhibit brighter colors than the adults. The scrawled cowfish, Acanthostracion quadricornis, can grow up to 50 centimetres (20 in) in length, but is generally smaller at higher latitudes.

=== Toxic defences ===
The various members of this family are able to secrete cationic surfactants through their skin which can act as a chemical defense mechanism. An example of this is pahutoxin, a water-soluble, crystalline chemical toxin that is contained in mucus secreted from the skin of Ostracion lentiginosus and other members of the trunkfish family when they are under stress. Pahutoxin is a choline chloride ester of 3-acetoxypalmitic acid that behaves similarly to steroidal saponins found in echinoderms. When this toxic mucus is released from the fish, it quickly dissolves in the environment and negatively affects any fish in the surrounding area. It is possible since this toxin resembles certain detergents so closely, that adding these detergents as pollutants to seawater has potential to interfere with receptor-mediated processes in marine life.

== Classification ==
The author Keiichi Matsuura lists the following genera and species:

=== Extant taxa ===
There are about 25 recognized extant species in six genera:

Genus	Species	Image
Acanthostracion Bleeker, 1865	A. guineense (Bleeker, 1865) (West African cowfish); A. notacanthus (Bleeker, 1863) (Island cowfish); A. polygonius Poey, 1876 (Honeycomb cowfish); A. quadricornis (Linnaeus, 1758) (Scrawled cowfish)	A. quadricornis
Lactophrys Swainson, 1839	L. bicaudalis (Linnaeus, 1758); L. trigonus (Linnaeus, 1758); L. triqueter (Linnaeus, 1758)	L. triqueter
Lactoria D. S. Jordan & Fowler, 1902	L. cornuta (Linnaeus, 1758); L. diaphana (Bloch & J. G. Schneider, 1801); L. fornasini (Bianconi, 1846)	L. cornuta
Ostracion Linnaeus, 1758	O. cubicum Linnaeus, 1758 (Yellow boxfish); O. cyanurus Rüppell, 1828 (Bluetail trunkfish); O. immaculatum Temminck & Schlegel, 1850 (Bluespotted boxfish); O. meleagris G. Shaw, 1796 (White-spotted boxfish); O. nasus Bloch, 1785 (Shortnose boxfish); O. rhinorhynchos Bleeker, 1851 (Horn-nosed boxfish); O. solorense Bleeker, 1853 (Reticulate boxfish); O. trachys J. E. Randall, 1975 (Roughskin trunkfish); O. whitleyi Fowler, 1931 (Whitley's boxfish)	O. meleagris
Paracanthostracion Whitley, 1933	P. lindsayi (Phillipps, 1932)	
Tetrosomus Swainson, 1839	T. concatenatus (Bloch, 1785) (Triangular boxfish); T. gibbosus (Linnaeus, 1758) (Camel cowfish); T. reipublicae (Whitley, 1930) (Smallspine turretfish); T. stellifer (Bloch & Schneider, 1801)	T. gibbosus

=== Fossil taxa ===
Genus	Species	Image
†Eolactoria Tyler, 1975	†Eolactoria sorbinii Tyler 1976 (Lutetian of Monte Bolca, Eocene Italy)	
†Oligolactoria Tyler & Gregorova, 1991	†Oligolactoria bubiki Tyler & Gregorova, 1991(Rupelian of Moravia, Oligocene Czech Republic)	
