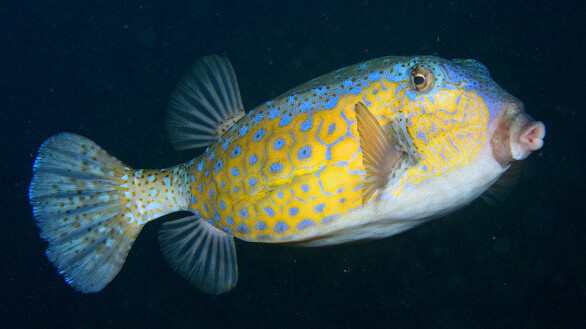
- In Japan

Conservation status
- Least Concern (IUCN 3.1)

Scientific classification
- Kingdom: Animalia
- Phylum: Chordata
- Class: Actinopterygii
- Order: Tetraodontiformes
- Family: Ostraciidae
- Genus: Ostracion
- Species: O. immaculatum

Binomial name
- Ostracion immaculatum Temminck & Schlegel, 1850

= Ostracion immaculatum =

Species of fish

Ostracion immaculatum, the bluespotted boxfish or immaculate boxfish, is a species of marine ray-finned fish belonging to the family Ostraciidae, the boxfishes. This species is found in the Western Pacific Ocean off Eastern Asia.

== Taxonomy ==
Ostracion immaculatum was first formally described as Ostracion immaculatus in 1850 by Coenraad Jacob Temminck and Hermann Schlegel with its type locality given as Japan.

=== Etymology ===
The genus name Ostracion means "little box" and alludes to the shape of the body of the type species, O. cubicum. The specific name, immaculatum means "unspotted" and is a reference to the unspotted appearance of this fish when preserved in alcohol, although in life they are covered with spots.

== Description ==
Ostracion immaculatum are yellow and blue in colour as adults with light blue spots on each of the plate=like scales that form the carapace. The juveniles are bright yellow with small pale blue and black spots, the black spots fade as the fish grows and the blue spots expand. This species has a maximum published standard length of 25 cm (9.8 in).

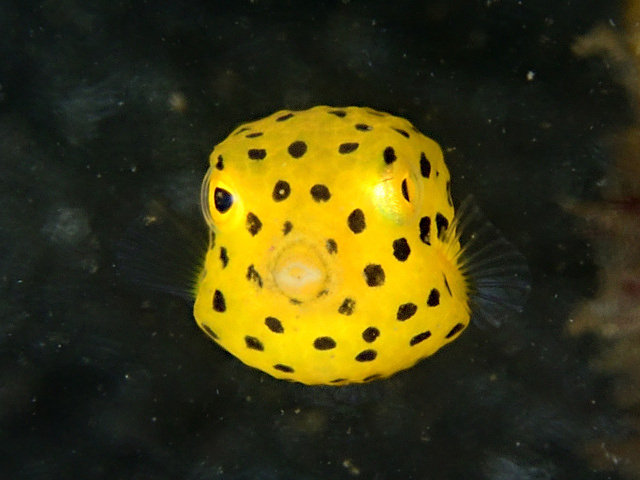
Young juvenile

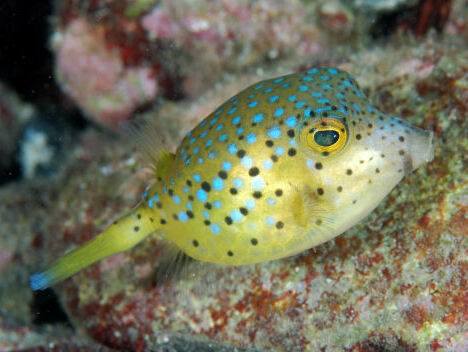
Older juvenile

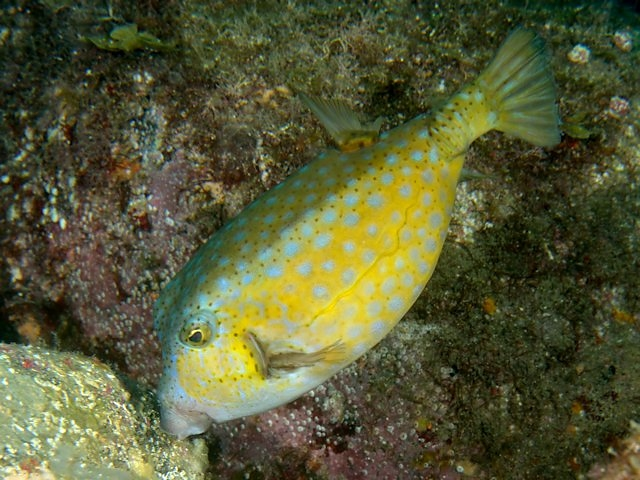
Adult

== Distribution and habitat ==
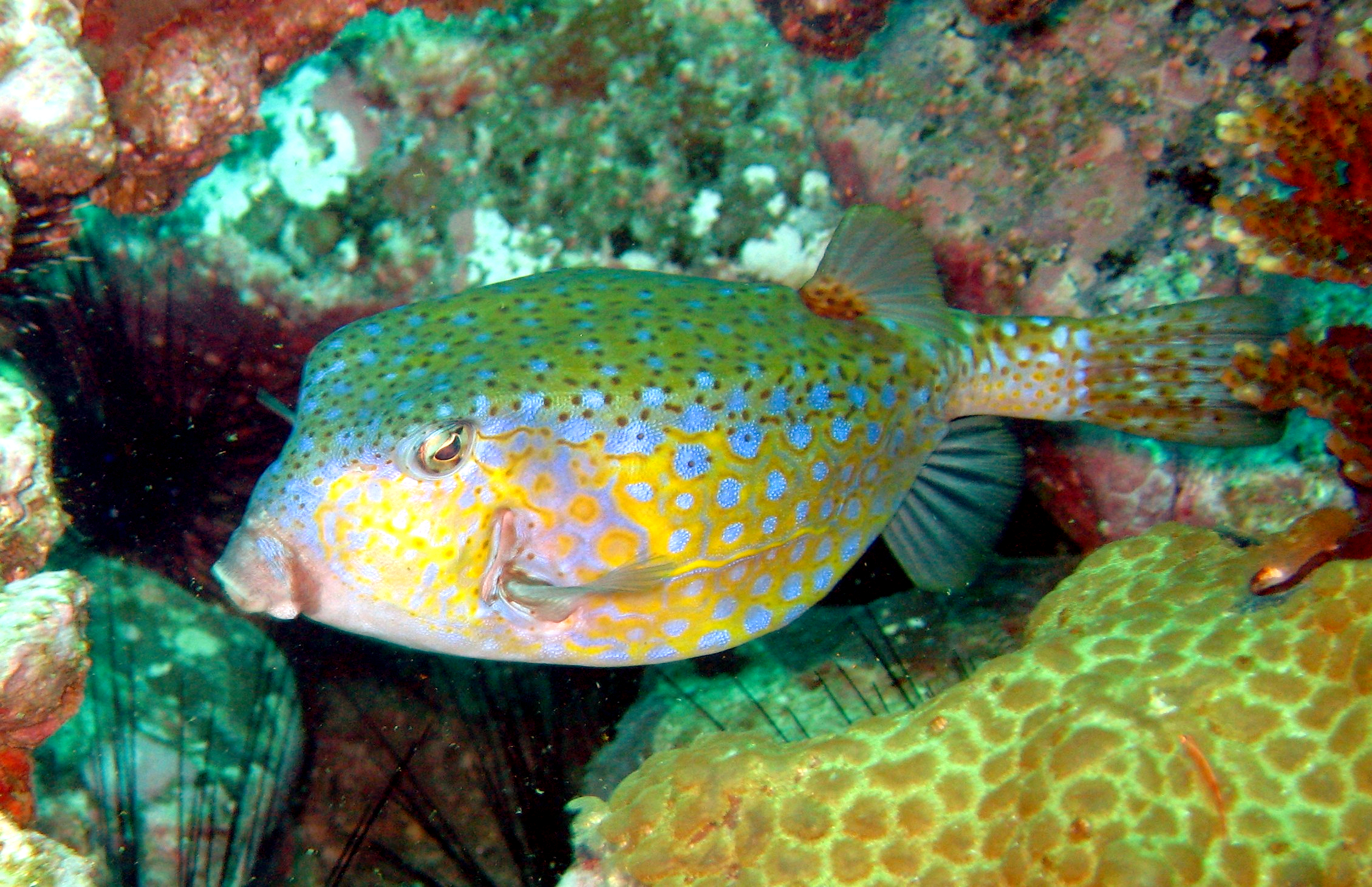
In Japan

Ostracium immaculatum is found in the northwestern Pacific Ocean from the southern coiats of Hokkaido south through the Japanese archipelago to Taiwan and along the mainland coast of Asia from Korea to Hong Kong. It is found at deptsh between 1 and 60 m (3 ft 3 in and 196 ft 10 in) on reefs close to the shore in shallow water where there is a rocky bottom.

== Biology ==
Ostracion immaculatus lives in small groups consisting of a single male and three or four females.
