= Mercedes-Benz Bionic =

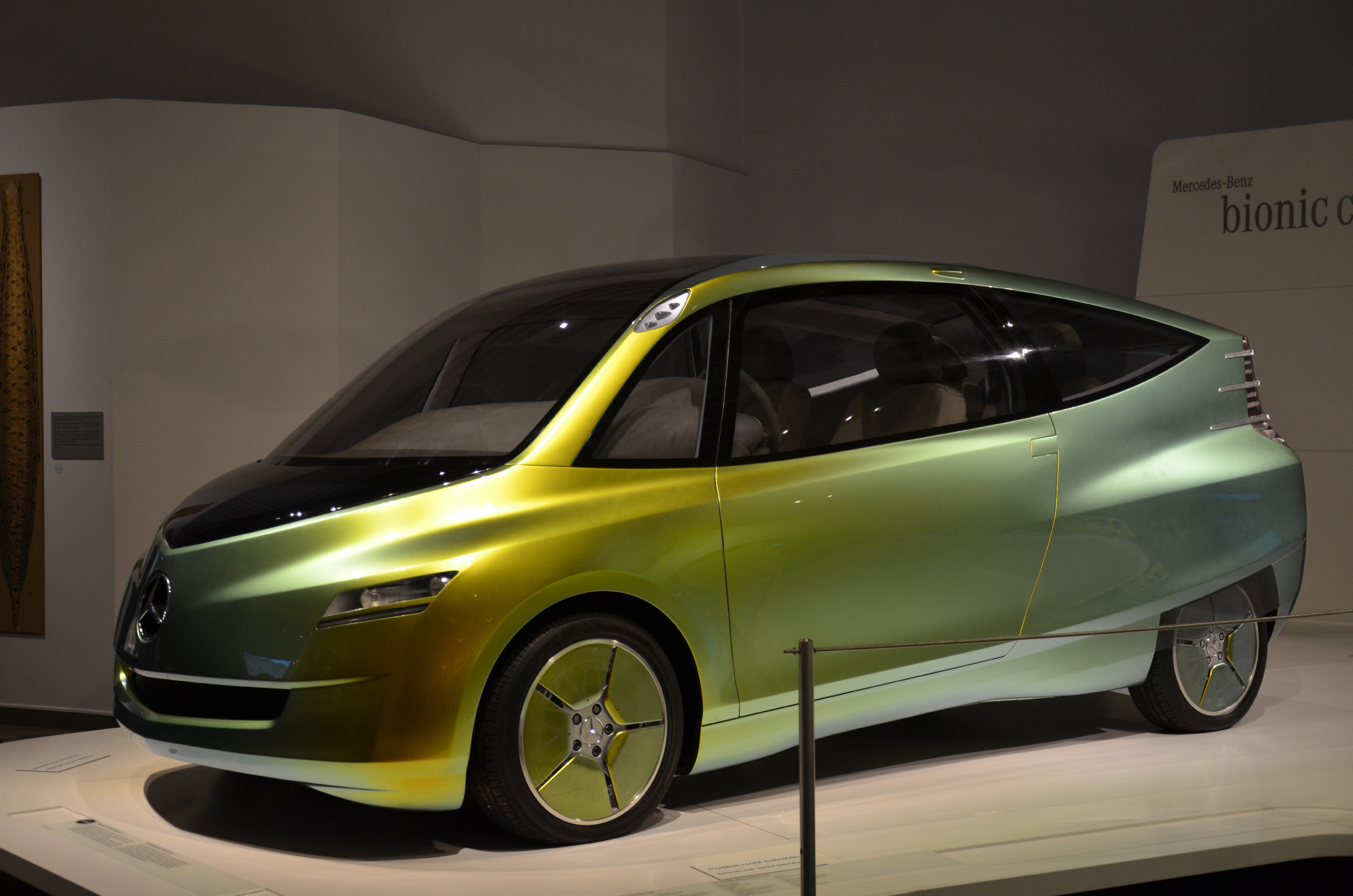

Overview
- Manufacturer: Mercedes-Benz
- Production: Concept car (2005)

Powertrain
- Engine: 1.9-liter four-cylinder direct-injection turbodiesel. 138 hp (103 kW)
- Transmission: Autotronic CVT transmission

Dimensions
- Wheelbase: 101 in (2,565 mm)
- Length: 167 in (4,242 mm)
- Width: 71.5 in (1,816 mm)
- Height: 62.8 in (1,595 mm)
- Curb weight: 2,425 lb (1,100 kg)

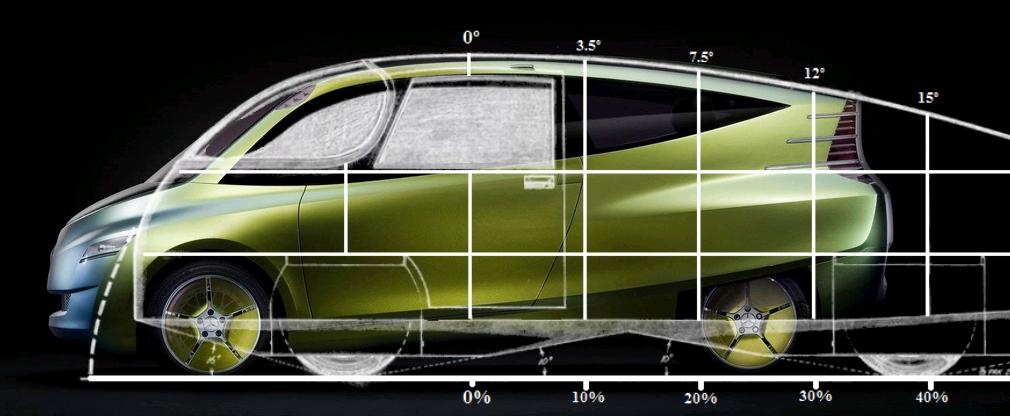
Comparison to a streamlined half-body with Cd of 0.12

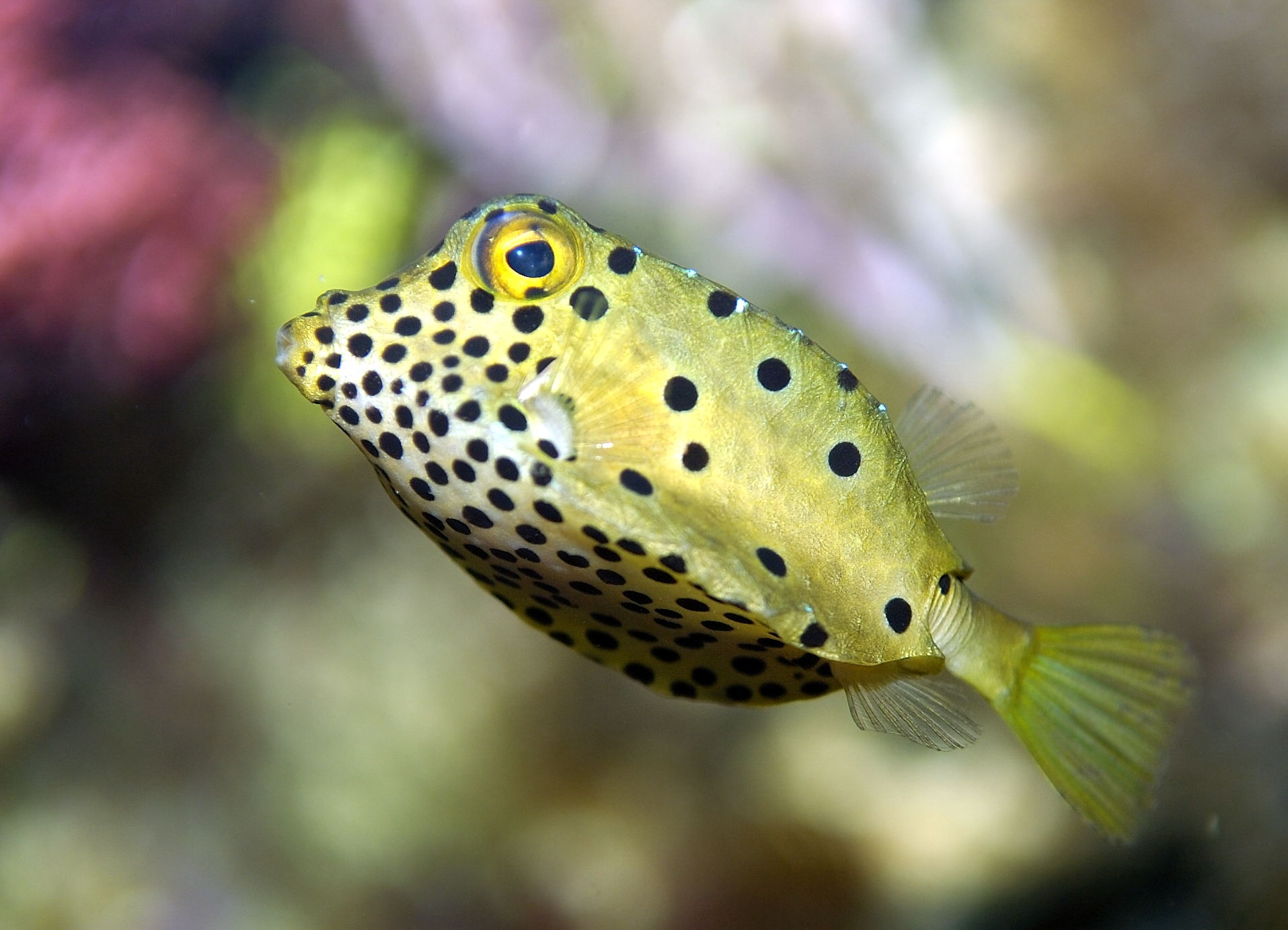
The yellow boxfish, Ostracion cubicus

The Mercedes-Benz Bionic is a concept car created by DaimlerChrysler AG under the Mercedes Group. It was first introduced in 2005 at the DaimlerChrysler Innovation Symposium in Washington, D.C. The Bionic is modeled after the yellow boxfish, Ostracion cubicus, and has 80% lower nitrogen oxide emissions with its selective catalytic reduction technology.

== Engine and performance ==
The Bionic is powered by a 103 kW direct-injection diesel engine with an average fuel economy of 54.7 MPG (US) (~4.3 L/100 km). This engine also outputs around 140 hp (104 kW) and a little over 221 ft⋅lbf (300 N⋅m) of torque at around 1,600 rpm. The Bionic can go from 0 to 60 mph (0 to 97 km/h) in about eight seconds and has a top speed of a little over 190 km/h (118 mph).

== Design ==
The exterior design was modeled after the yellow boxfish (Ostracion cubicus), a marine fish that lives in coral reefs. Mercedes-Benz decided to model the Bionic after this fish due to the supposed low coefficient of drag of its body shape and the rigidity of its exoskeleton; this influenced the car's unusual looks. It was believed that the shape of the boxfish would improve aerodynamics and stability. However, in 2015, a paper in Journal of the Royal Society Interface stated that "The drag-reduction performance of the two boxfish species studied was relatively low compared with more generalized body shapes of fish". Other parts of the design include the fact that the rear wheels are partially fitted with plastic and that it is considered as a lightweight vehicle. Mercedes-Benz reported a drag coefficient of 0.19; for comparison, the production vehicle with the lowest ever C_{d} value was the GM EV1, at 0.195. While the Bionic had a much larger internal volume than the EV1, the Bionic's larger frontal area made the EV1 more aerodynamic overall, as drag is a product of the area and the drag coefficient.

The vehicle was capable of seating four people.
