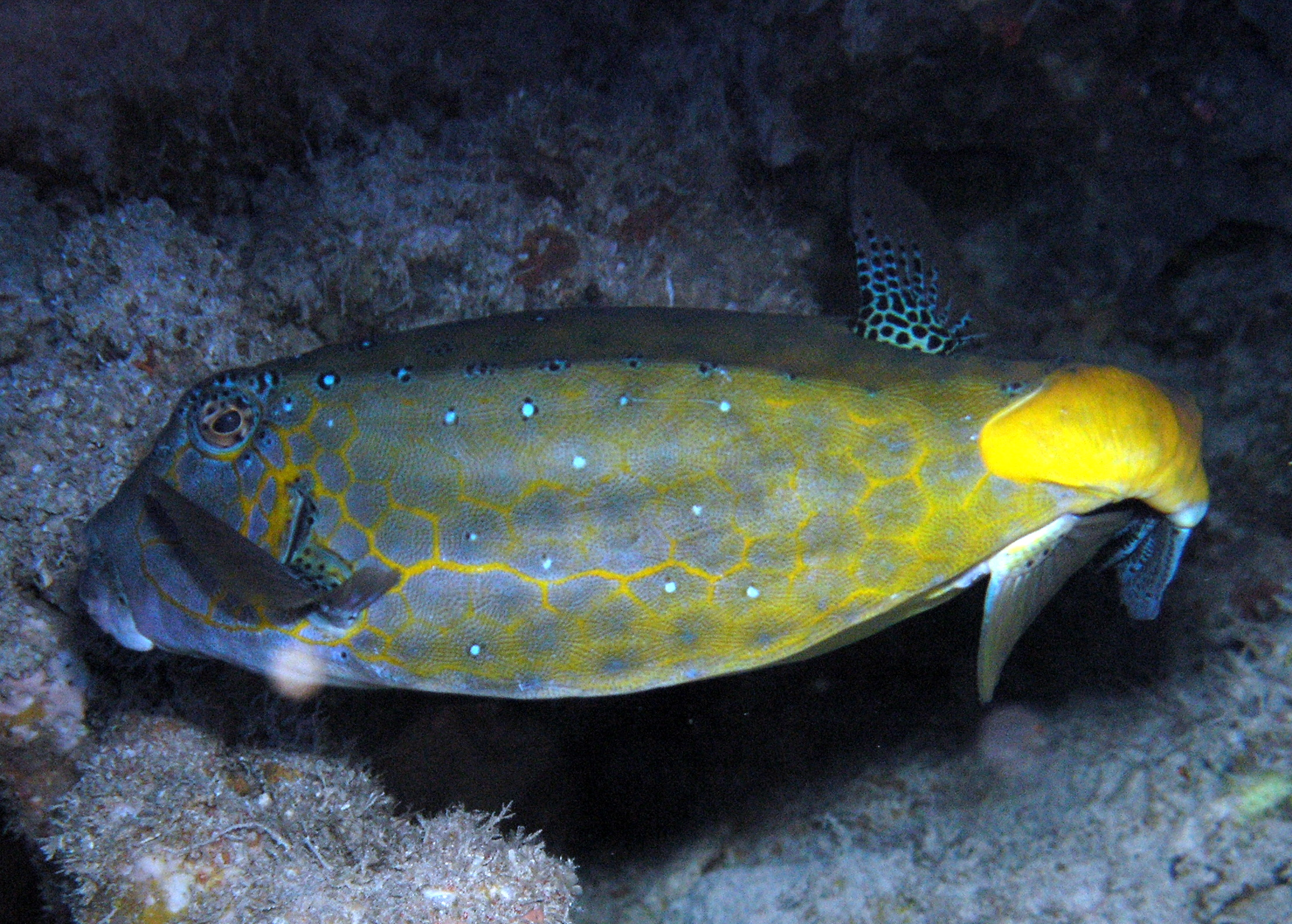
- Ostracion cubicum

Scientific classification
- Kingdom: Animalia
- Phylum: Chordata
- Class: Actinopterygii
- Division: Teleostei
- Order: Tetraodontiformes
- Family: Ostraciidae
- Genus: Ostracion; Linnaeus, 1758

Type species
- Ostracion cubicus Linnaeus, 1758

Synonyms
- Cibotion Kaup, 1855; Posthias Billberg, 1833; Rhynchostracion Fraser-Brunner, 1935

= Ostracion =

Ostracion Temporal range: 56–0 Ma Thanetian to Present

Genus of fishes

Ostracion is a genus of marine ray-finned fishes belonging to the family Ostraciidae, the boxfishes. These fishes are found in the Indo-Pacific region as far east as the eastern Pacific coasts of the Americas.

== Taxonomy ==
Ostracion was first proposed as a genus by Carl Linnaeus in the 10th edition of Systema Naturae. Ostracion cubicus was subsequently designated as the type species of this genus. However, the original designation is unclear, Pieter Bleeker designate O. teragonus as the type in 1865 while David Starr Jordan and Charles Henry Gilbert designated it as O. cubiceps in 1883. This genus is the type genus of the family Ostraciidae which the 5th edition of Fishes of the World classifies within the family Ostraciidae in the suborder Ostracioidea within the order Tetraodontiformes.

=== Etymology ===
Ostracion comes from ὀστρᾰ́κιον (ostrắkion), dimimutive of ὄστρακον (óstrakon), meaning "shell", and is an allusion to the shape of the body of the type species, O. cubicum.

== Distribution and habitat ==
Ostracion boxfishes are found in the Indian and Pacific Oceans from the Red Sea and eastern coast of Africa as far as the Eastern Pacific between Mexico and Ecuador. One species, the yellow boxfish, has reached the Mediterranean Sea through the Suez Canal. These fishes are solitary species of lagoons and reefs, typically in shallow water.

== Description ==
Ostracion boxfishes have thick and oblong bodies which are largely encased in a carapace made up of thickened, bony plate-like hexagonal scales which are jointed to one another. The carapace is cuboidal in shape, it is gently rounded on its dorsal surface and flat on its ventral surface. There are a pair of longitudinal ridges on the lower flanks but there are no spines on the carapace, which has gaps for the mouth, eyes, gill slits, fins and caudal peduncle. They do have a protruding snout with a small mouth which has fleshy lips and 15, or less, moderately sized conical teeth in each jaw. The gill splits are short and oblique and sit to the front of the base of the pectoral fins. The dorsal and anal fins are positioned towards the rear. The caudal peduncle is slender and the caudal fin is a rounded fan.

The largest species in the genus is the yellow boxfish (O. cubicum), with a maximum published total length of 45 cm (18 in), while the smallest is the roughskin trunkfish (O. trachys), with a maximum published total length of 11.5 cm (4.5 in).

== Species ==
Ostracion contains the following recognised species:

Species	Common name	Image
Ostracion cubicum Linnaeus, 1758	Yellow boxfish	
Ostracion cyanurus Rüppell, 1828	Bluetail trunkfish	
Ostracion immaculatum Temminck & Schlegel, 1850	Bluespotted boxfish	
Ostracion meleagris G. Shaw, 1796	White-spotted boxfish	
Ostracion nasus Bloch, 1785	Shortnose boxfish	
Ostracion rhinorhynchos Bleeker, 1851	Horn-nosed boxfish	
Ostracion solorense Bleeker, 1853	Reticulate boxfish	
Ostracion trachys J. E. Randall, 1975	Roughskin trunkfish	
Ostracion whitleyi Fowler, 1931	Whitley's boxfish	
