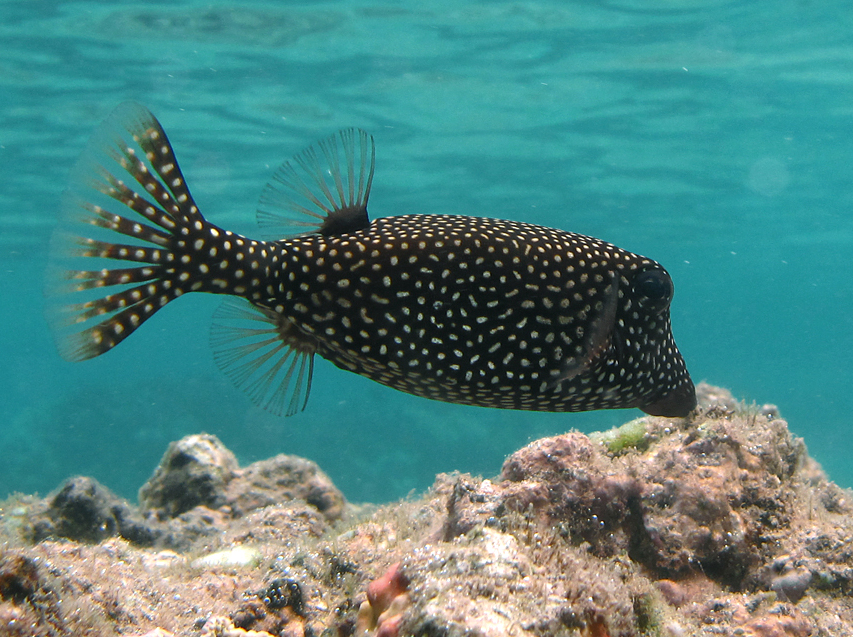
- Female

Conservation status
- Least Concern (IUCN 3.1)

Scientific classification
- Kingdom: Animalia
- Phylum: Chordata
- Class: Actinopterygii
- Division: Teleostei
- Order: Tetraodontiformes
- Family: Ostraciidae
- Genus: Ostracion
- Species: O. meleagris

Binomial name
- Ostracion meleagris G. Shaw, 1796

Synonyms
- List: Ostracion lentiginosus Bloch & Schneider, 1801; Ostracion punctatus Bloch & Schneider, 1801; Ostracion sebae Bleeker, 1851; Ostracion camurum Jenkins, 1901; Ostracion clippertonense Snodgrass & Heller, 1905

= Spotted boxfish =

- Male

Species of fish

The spotted boxfish (Ostracion meleagris), also known as the black boxfish, ornate boxfish or white-spotted boxfish, is a species of marine ray-finned fish belonging to the family Ostraciidae, the boxfishes. This species is found in the Indian and Pacific Oceans. It occurs on reefs at depths of from 1 to 30 metres (3.3 to 98.4 feet). This species grows to a length of 25 centimetres (9.8 inches). Males and females differ in colour: males are blackish on the back with white spots, and have bluish sides with bright yellowish bands and spots. Females and juveniles are dark brown to blackish with white spots. As with other species of boxfish, the spotted boxfish's bony carapace gives it a distinctly angular appearance; it has been described as resembling an ottoman.

== Taxonomy ==
The spotted boxfish was first formally described in 1796 by the English naturalist George Shaw with its type locality given as the Southern Ocean, i.e. the South Pacific. The spotted trunkfish is classified in the genus Ostracion which the 5th edition of Fishes of the World classifies within the family Ostraciidae in the suborder Ostracioidea within the order Tetraodontiformes.

== Etymology ==
The spotted boxfish is classified in the genus Ostracion, this name means "little box" and is an allusion to the shape of the body of its type species, O. cubicum. The specific name, meleagris is the specific name of the helmeted guineafowl and is an allusion to the white spots on a dark background like the plumage pattern of a guineafowl.

== Description and anatomy ==
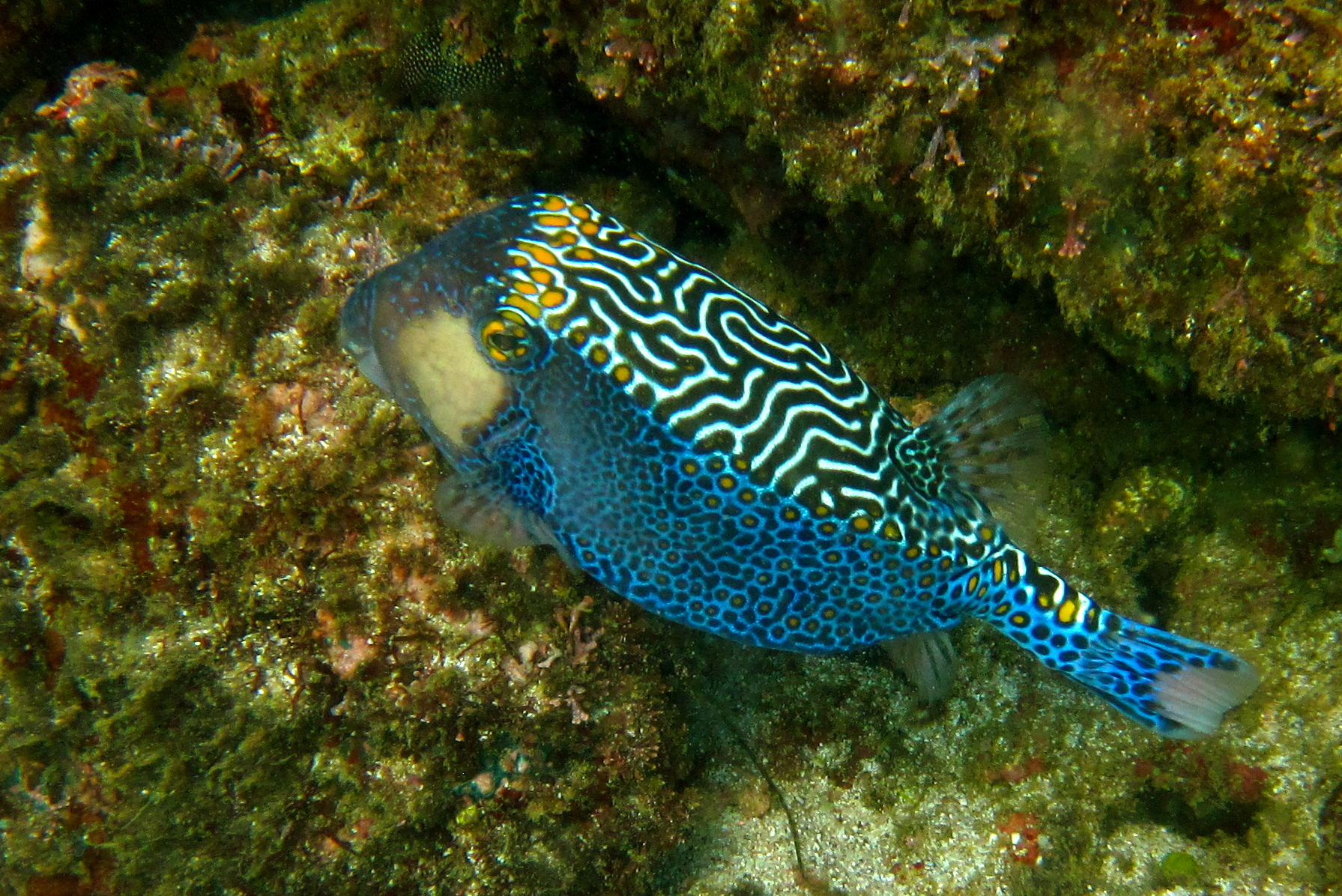
Male, in the Sea of Cortez (Mexico)

The Spotted Boxfish has an oblong thick body that are enclosed in a bony box formed by thickened, joined, enlarged, and hexagonal scale plates. Juveniles with male patterns or colors are never seen or has never been spotted before; either the juvenile males are born with the female colors, or all the young juveniles are born as a female and change their sex later in their life.

Their diet consists of sponges, worms, tunicates as well as other small invertebrates.

Their box has openings for the mouth, eyes, gill slits, fins, and tail base. Their backs are slightly rounded. They have a pair of longitudinal ridges on their lower flanks, a flat bottom, and no spines. Their small mouth opens at the front with fleshy lips and has 15 mid-sized teeth on each jaw. Their gill openings are short and form oblique slits in front of their pectoral base. Their anal and dorsal fins are at the rear; their caudal fin is rounded; their dorsal fin has no spines; and, they do not have pelvic fins.

The Spotted Boxfish make noises and sounds during the mating process. For example, when mating, the male or female, sometimes both, make a low pitched humming sound that lasts for about 6 seconds. Another example is after the mating process, when another male comes to "spawn" with the female or to disrupt the mating process, the two males fight each other, sometimes creating an audible thump sound & they even produce a short buzzing sound.

They are protected by a toxic slime that can kill other fish, thus making them unsuitable for use in aquariums.

== Habitat ==
They can be found in the Indo-Pacific Ocean. They can also be found in seaward and protected reefs. That's just where the adults reside most of the time, whilst the juveniles often find shelter between the long spines of the tropical sea urchins anchored to the rocks.

== Reproduction ==
Phillip Lobel, an ichthyologist, found out that they mate during the afternoon and the early evening hours. The Spotted Boxfish species usually travel in a group, consisting of one male and several females. They start the mating process by the male nudging and circling one female. When she responds, they swim side-by-side while rising 6 ft or more from the bottom. The male leads the female to that point. Staying in that side-by-side formation with their tails together and heads slightly apart from one another, they both release their gametes (a mature haploid male or female germ cell which is able to unite with another of the opposite sex in sexual reproduction) and swim back to the bottom again together. Unfortunately, when that process is done and they both are with each other at the bottom again, it calls males to the female Boxfish to disrupt the process or calls them to mate with her instead, and that's why fights are not uncommon between male Spotted Boxfishes.

== Gallery ==
In Indonesia

At Mauritius
