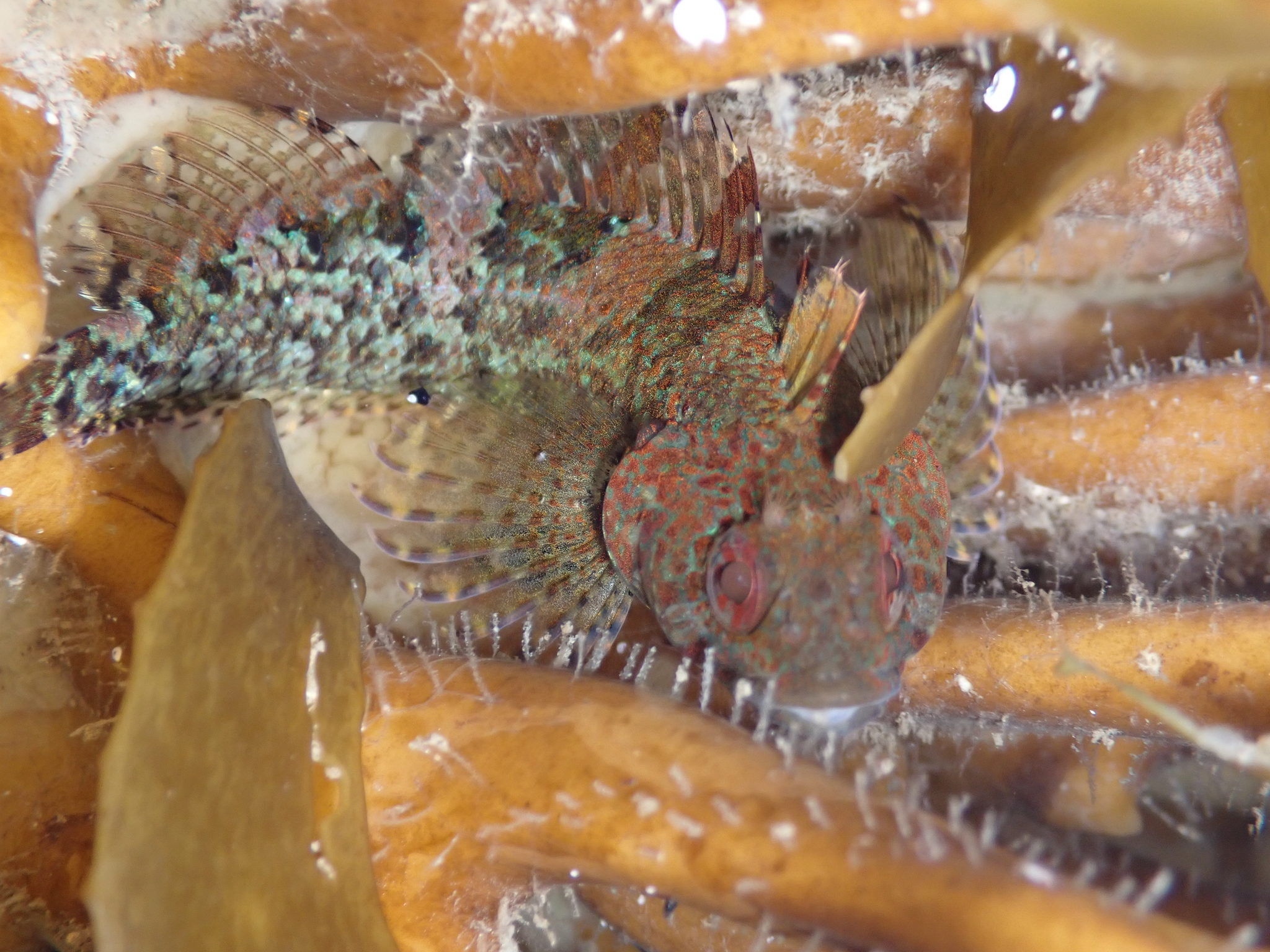

Conservation status
- Least Concern (IUCN 3.1)

Scientific classification
- Kingdom: Animalia
- Phylum: Chordata
- Class: Actinopterygii
- Division: Teleostei
- Order: Blenniiformes
- Family: Tripterygiidae
- Genus: Gilloblennius
- Species: G. tripennis

Binomial name
- Gilloblennius tripennis (Forster, 1801)

Synonyms
- Blennius tripennis Forster, 1801; Enneapterygius tripennis (Forster, 1801); Tripterygion tripenne (Forster, 1801); Tripterygion forsteri Valenciennes, 1836

= Thripenny =

Species of fish

The thripenny (Gilloblennius tripennis) is a species of triplefin blenny in the genus Gilloblennius. It was described by Johann Reinhold Forster in 1801. It is endemic to New Zealand where it is found throughout the mainland and off the Three Kings Islands, Snares Island and Chatham Islands.
