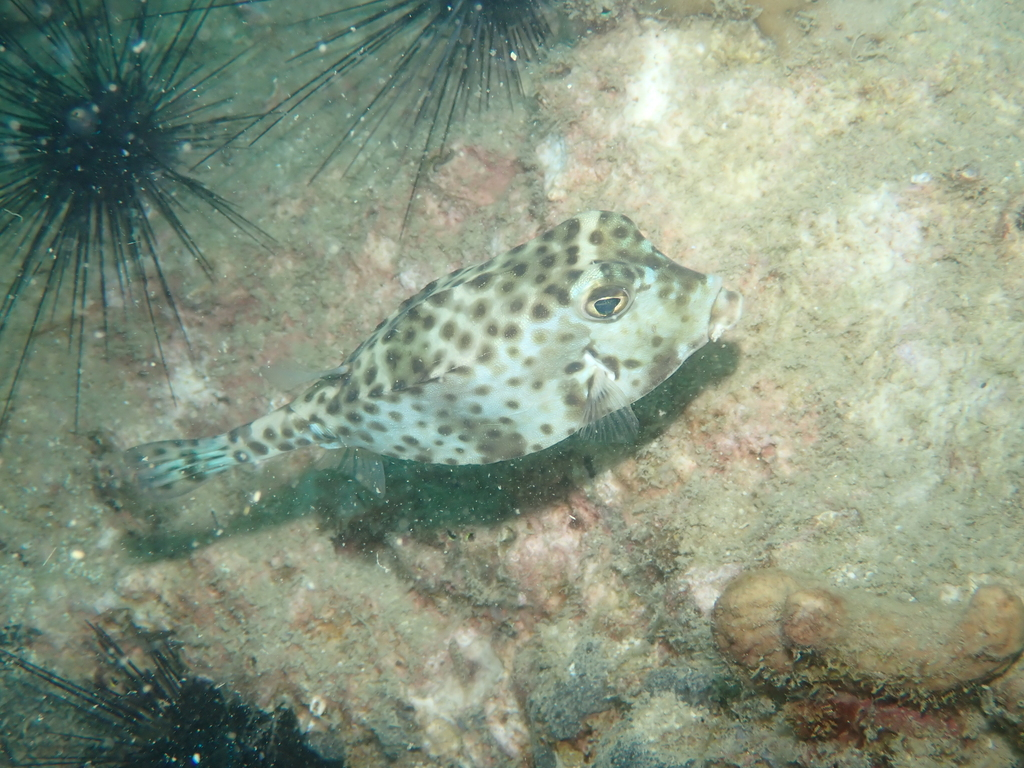

Conservation status
- Least Concern (IUCN 3.1)

Scientific classification
- Kingdom: Animalia
- Phylum: Chordata
- Class: Actinopterygii
- Order: Tetraodontiformes
- Family: Ostraciidae
- Genus: Ostracion
- Species: O. nasus

Binomial name
- Ostracion nasus Bloch, 1785

Synonyms
- Rhynchostracion nasus (Bloch, 1785)

= Shortnose boxfish =

Species of fish

The Shortnose boxfish (Ostracion nasus) is a species of marine ray-finned fish belonging to the family Ostraciidae, the boxfishes. This species is found in the Indian and Pacific Oceans.

== Taxonomy ==
The shortnose boxfish was first formally described in 1785 by the German physician and naturalist Marcus Elieser Bloch with its type locality given as the Nile Delta, Egypt, probably erroneously. This species is classified in the genus Ostracion which the 5th edition of Fishes of the World classifies within the family Ostraciidae in the suborder Ostracioidea within the order Tetraodontiformes.

== Etymology ==
The shortnose boxfish is classified in the genus Ostracion, this name means "little box" and is an allusion to the shape of the body of its type species, O. cubicum. The specific name, nasus means "nose" and is a reference to the short snout.

== Description ==
The shortnose boxfish has 9 soft rays supporting both the dorsal and anal fins while the caudal fin has 10 rays, 8 of which are branched. Both sexes have a short, fleshy protuberance that overhangs the lips, which is thicker and wider in males. Juveniles are typically white-to-beige with large, uniform spots, while adults are typically tan with large, irregular, brown spots mostly centered on the dorsal side. This species has a maximum published total length of 30 cm (12 in).

== Distribution and habitat ==
The shortnose boxfish is found in the Indo-Pacific where it occurs from Sri Lanka east to Fiji, north to the Philippines and south to northwestern Australia. This species is found over soft and rocky substrates at depths between 2 and 80 m (6 ft 7 in and 262 ft 6 in).
