= Pahutoxin =

Names
- Preferred IUPAC name 2-{[(3S)-3-(Acetyloxy)hexadecanoyl]oxy}-N,N,N-trimethylethan-1-aminium chloride
- Other names Ostracitoxin

Identifiers
CAS Number	27742-14-9
3D model (JSmol)	Interactive image
ChEBI	CHEBI:80781
ChemSpider	106683
KEGG	C16889
PubChem CID	119452
CompTox Dashboard (EPA)	DTXSID80896908
- InChI: InChI=1S/C23H46NO4.ClH/c1-6-7-8-9-10-11-12-13-14-15-16-17-22(28-21(2)25)20-23(26)27-19-18-24(3,4)5;/h22H,6-20H2,1-5H3;1H/q+1;/p-1/t22-;/m0./s1 Key: NJEOXMPQOCEVAI-FTBISJDPSA-M
- SMILES: CCCCCCCCCCCCC[C@@H](CC(=O)OCC[N+](C)(C)C)OC(=O)C.[Cl-]

Properties
Chemical formula	C_{23}H_{46}ClNO_{4}
Molar mass	436.07 g·mol^{−1}
- Except where otherwise noted, data are given for materials in their standard state (at 25 °C [77 °F], 100 kPa). Infobox references

Pahutoxin, formerly called ostracitoxin, is a neurotoxin present in the mucous secretions of boxfish (Ostraciidae) skin, while under stress. It is an ichthyotoxic, hemolytic, nonpeptide (which is relatively unusual, although similar to tetrodotoxin in this way) toxin. It is heat-stable and non-dialyzable, that is, foamed in aqueous solutions, and is toxic to various biological systems. It is unique among known fish poisons. It is toxic to other boxfish as well and looks like red tide and sea cucumber toxins in general properties. Although it is not recommended, it is a growing trend to keep boxfish in a home aquarium. Members of the family Ostraciidae secrete an ichthyotoxic mucus from their skin when stressed or disturbed.

The boxfish must be alive to synthesize its bodily chemicals into the toxin, therefore it cannot release its toxin after it dies. It may, however, have residual toxin if it were in the process of releasing toxin when it died.
