= William J. Phillipps =

William J. Phillipps (1893–1967) was a New Zealand ichthyologist.

He was in 1923 resident naturalist and ethnologist at the Dominion Museum of Wellington.

== Bibliography ==
- William J. Phillipps with Gilbert Percy Whitley (1939) Descriptive notes on some New Zealand fishes Transactions of the Royal Society of New Zealand, 69: 228-236.
- Phillipps, W.J. (1932) Notes on new fishes from New Zealand. New Zealand journal of science and technology 13: 226–234

== See also ==
- Category:Taxa named by William John Phillipps
