= Ostracioidea =

- Ornate cowfish (Aracana ornata)
- Yellow boxfish (Ostracion cubicum)

Scientific classification
- Kingdom: Animalia
- Phylum: Chordata
- Class: Actinopterygii
- Division: Teleostei
- Order: Tetraodontiformes
- Suborder: Balistoidei
- Superfamily: Ostracioidea; Rafinesque, 1810

Families
- See text.

Synonyms
- Ostracodermi

Suborder of fishes

Ostracioidea or Ostracioidei, the boxfishes, is a suborder of ray-finned fishes belonging to the order Tetraodontiformes, which also includes the pufferfishes, filefishes and triggerfishes. The fishes in this taxon are found in the Atlantic, Indian and Pacific Oceans.

== Taxonomy ==
Ostracioidea was named in 1810 by the French polymath Constantine Samuel Rafinesque, and has been regarded as a family with the two extant families being regarded as subfamilies. However, recent phylogenetic studies have concluded that the families Aracanidae and Ostraciidae are valid families but that they are part of the same clade.

The 5th edition of Fishes of the World classifies this clade as the suborder Ostracioidea within the order Tetraodontiformes.

== Etymology ==
Ostracioidea takes its name from the type genus, Ostracion, of the family Ostraciidae. This name was proposed by Linnaeus in 1758 and means "little box" an allusion to the body shape of O. cubicus.

== Families ==
Ostracioidea contains two extant families and two extinct families:

- Aracanidae Hollard, 1860
- Ostraciidae Rafinesque, 1810
- †Spinacanthidae Santini & Tyler, 2003
- †Protobalistidae Gill, 1888

== Characteristics ==
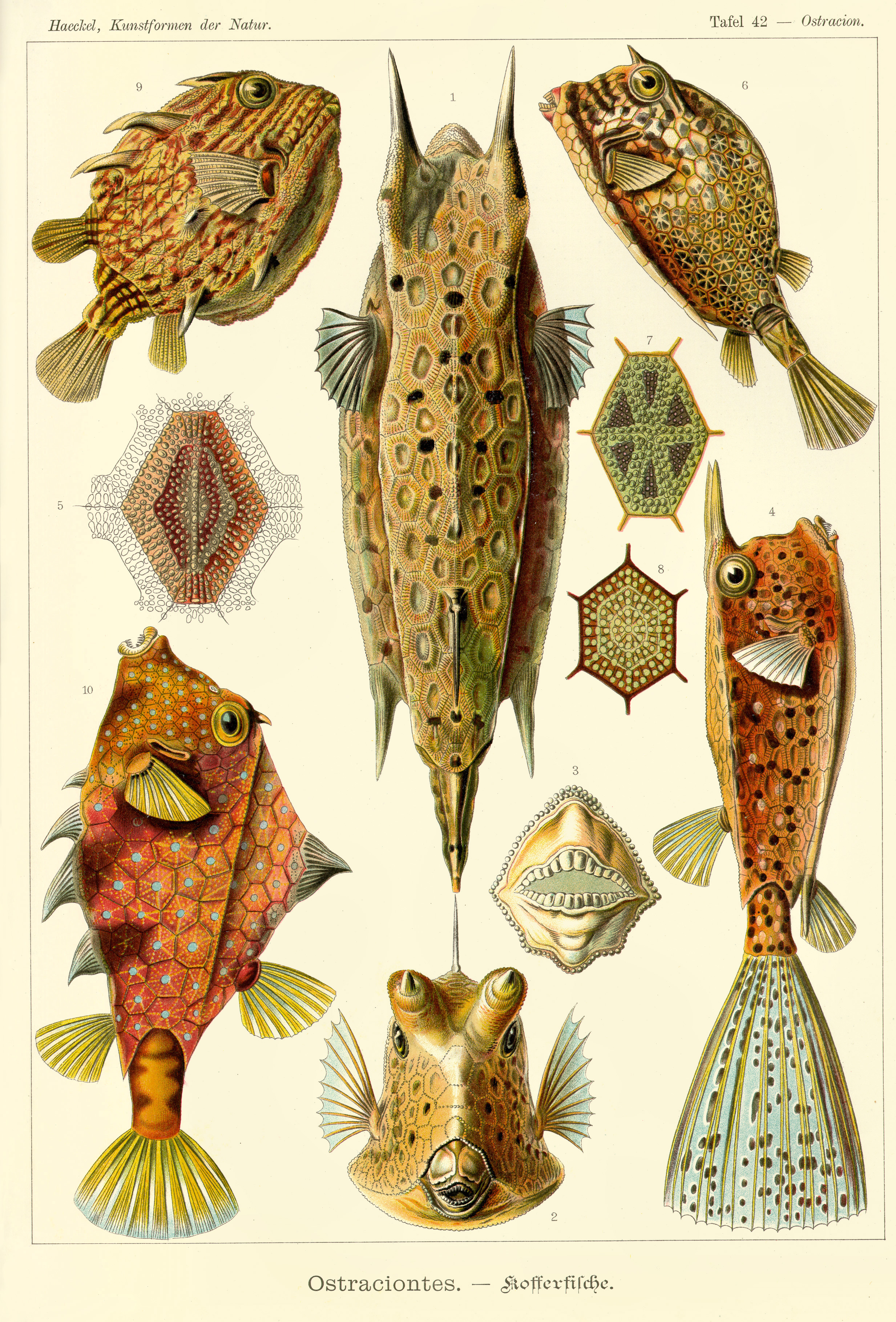
1904 illustration by Ernst Haeckel: Lactoria cornuta (1-5), Acanthostracion quadricornis (6-8), Aracana aurita (9),Tetrosomus gibbosus (10)

Ostracioid boxfishes share the head and much of the body, apart from the cheeks, being encased in a carapace made up of thick, typically hexagonal, inflexible plate-like scales. These scales are interlinked by small finger-like extensions along their margins. To the rear of the carapace there are isolated scale plates which vary in shape but there is no complete covering of scales. The cross section of the body shows slight lateral compression with at least two angles or ridges. There is no spiny dorsal fin and the soft dorsal fin and anal fin have short bases and are supported by 9 to 13 soft rays. They do not have a pelvis or pelvic fins. There are between 6 and 17 teeth typically small, conical teeth arranged in a single series in each jaw, these are sometimes compressed at their bases and may taper at the tips.

The largest species in the suborder are the scrawled cowfish (Acanthostracion quadricornis) and the buffalo trunkfish (Lactophrys trigonus) each with a maximum published total length of 55 cm (22 in), while the smallest species are just above 10 cm (3.9 in) in length.

== Distribution and habitat ==
Ostracioid boxfishes have distributions centred on the Indo-West Pacific region, especially around Australia, and the deepwater oxfishes of the family Aracanidae are restricted to that region. The boxfishes in the family Ostraciidae are more widespread and some species in this family are found in the Atlantic and Eastern Pacific Oceans too. The deepwater boxfishes, or temperate, boxfishes live as their name suggests in deeper waters.
