= Kentrocapros rosapinto =

Conservation status
- Least Concern (IUCN 3.1)

Scientific classification
- Kingdom: Animalia
- Phylum: Chordata
- Class: Actinopterygii
- Order: Tetraodontiformes
- Family: Aracanidae
- Genus: Kentrocapros
- Species: K. rosapinto

Binomial name
- Kentrocapros rosapinto (J. L. B. Smith, 1949)

Synonyms
- Aracanostracion rosapinto J. L. B. Smith, 1949

Species of fish

Kentrocapros rosapinto, the basketfish, is a species of marine ray-finned fish belonging to the family Aracanidae, the temperate boxfishes or deepwater boxfishes. This fish is found in the Western Indian Ocean and in the southeastern Atlantic Ocean.

== Taxonomy ==
Kentrocapros rosapinto was first formally described as Aracanostracion rosapinto in 1949 by the South African ichthyologist J. L. B. Smith with its type locality given as Delagoa Bay in Mozambique. The 5th edition of Fishes of the World classifies the genus Kentrocapros in the family Aracanidae which is in the suborder Ostracioidea within the order Tetraodontiformes.

== Etymology ==
Kentrocapros rosapinto is classified within the genus Kentrocapros, a name which combines kentro meaning "thorn" or "spine", a reference to the spiny ridge along the flanks of the type species, K. aculeatus, with capros, meaning "wild boar". This may allude to these fishes being known as seapigs in the 19th Century, probably an allusion to the resemblance of these fishes on a rear view to a pig. The specific name honours the Portuguese ornithologist Antonio Augusto da Rosa Pinto, who was director of the Lourenço Marques Museum.

== Description ==
Kentrocapros rosapinto has 10 or 11 soft rays in its dorsal fin and in its anal fin, while the pectoral fins have between 11 and 13 and the caudal fin has 11, 9 of which are branched. The males have a concex dorsal profile to the snout while that of females is concave or straight. The carapace is flattened between the upper ridges and between the lower ridges. The three redges on each side are sharp but do not bear spines. Males have a yellow-brown upper carapace, a yellow stripe along the middle of the flanks with blue plates on the flanks, a blue snout. Females are paler and greyer and have spots above the bases of the pectoral fins and on the caudal peduncle. Both sexes have red fleshy lips. This species has a maximum published standard length of 14.3 cm (5.6 in).

== Distribution and habitat ==
Kentrocapros rosapinto is found in the Western Indian Ocean where it has been recorded from southeastern Africa between the Bazaruto Islands in Mozambique to KwaZulu-Natal in South Africa, Madagascar, the Seychelles, Mauritius, the Saya de Malha Bank and Walters Shoals. In 1997 a specimen was collected in the southeastern Atlantic from the Vema Seamount. This is a demersal fish found at depths between 125 and 250 nm (4.9×10^{−6} and 9.8×10^{−6} in).
