= Kentrocapros flavofasciatus =

Conservation status
- Least Concern (IUCN 3.1)

Scientific classification
- Kingdom: Animalia
- Phylum: Chordata
- Class: Actinopterygii
- Order: Tetraodontiformes
- Family: Aracanidae
- Genus: Kentrocapros
- Species: K. flavofasciatus

Binomial name
- Kentrocapros flavofasciatus (Kamohara, 1938)

Synonyms
- Aracana flavofasciata Kamohara, 1938

Species of fish

Kentrocapros flavofasciatus, the yellowstriped boxfish, is a species of marine ray-finned fish belonging to the family Aracanidae, the temperate boxfishes or deepwater boxfishes. This species has an antitropical distribution in the northern and southwestern Pacific Ocean.

== Taxonomy ==
Kentrocapros flavofasciatus was first formally described in 2023 by the Japanese ichthyologist Toshiji Kamohara with its type locality given as Urado, Kochi, Japan. The 5th edition of Fishes of the World classifies the genus Kentrocapros in the family Aracanidae which is in the suborder Ostracioidea within the order Tetraodontiformes.

== Etymology ==
Kentrocapros flavofasciatus is classified within the genus Kentrocapros, a name which combines kentro meaning "thorn" or "spine", a reference to the spiny ridge along the flanks of the type species, K. aculeatus, with capros, meaning "wild boar". This may allude to these fishes being known as seapigs in the 19th Century, probably an allusion to the resemblance of these fishes on a rear view to a pig. The specific name, flavofasciatus, means "yellow striped" and refers to the two wide, horizontal yellow bands, the upper band extending from the forehead to the caudal peduncle, the lower band from the angle of the mouth, running below the eye, and joining with the upper band at rear of the base of the dorsal fin.

== Description ==
Kentrocapros flavofasciatus has between 9 and 11 soft rays in the dorsal fin, 10 in the anal fin, 12 or 13 in the pectoral fins and 11 in the caudal fin. The gill slit is slightly oblique and is located underneath the rear half of eye, with the rear end of the gill opening does not reach under the rear edge of the eye. There are isolated bony plates on the caudal peduncle. The upper flanks are bluish and there are two wide yellow stripes running along the head and body: the upper band extending from the forehead to the caudal peduncle, the lower band from the angle of the mouth, running below the eye, and joining with the upper band at rear of the base of the dorsal fin. The females have numerous clear round black spots on the back and upper flanks, a wide bluish stripe to the rearof the eye, and do not have the yellow stripes of the males. The yellowstriped boxfish has a maximum published standard length of 14.6 cm (5.7 in).

== Distribution and habitat ==
Kentrocapros flavofasciatus is found in the Western pacific and may have an antitropical distribution. In the northwestern Pacific it is found from Jeju Island, southern Japan, the East China Sea, Taiwan and Vietnam. In the southwestern Pacific it is found off New Caledonia and along the Lord Howe Rise, and in Australia from Cairns, Queensland south to Moruya, New South Wales, it is also found off the Exmouth Gulf, Western Australia, and has been reported from Hawaii. It is a demersal fish found on deep, rocky reefs at depths between 80 and 360 m (260 and 1,180 ft)>
