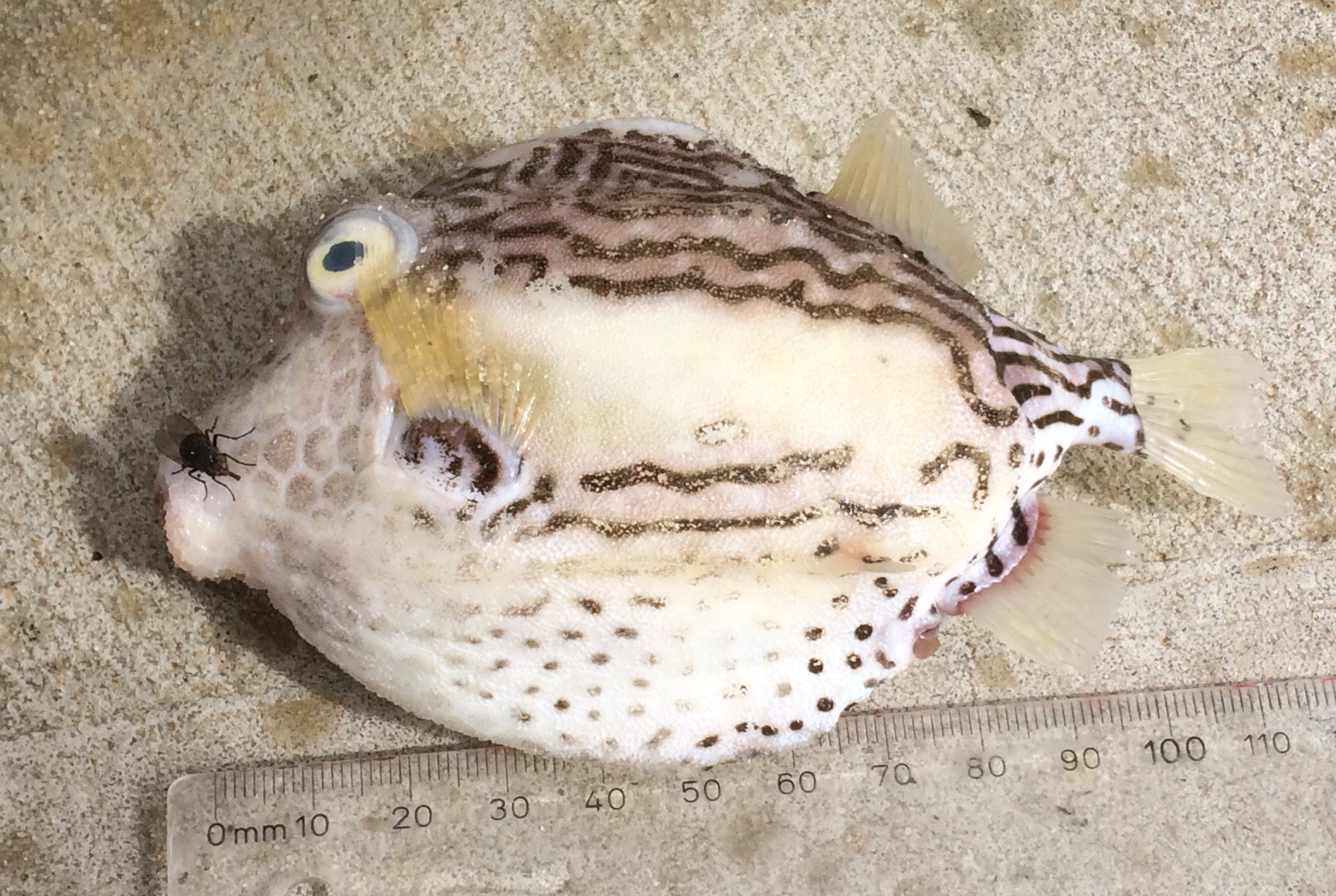

Conservation status
- Least Concern (IUCN 3.1)

Scientific classification
- Kingdom: Animalia
- Phylum: Chordata
- Class: Actinopterygii
- Order: Tetraodontiformes
- Family: Aracanidae
- Genus: Caprichthys; McCulloch & Waite, 1915
- Species: C. gymnura

Binomial name
- Caprichthys gymnura McCulloch & Waite, 1915

= Caprichthys =

Monospecific genus of fish

Caprichthys is a monospecific genus of marine ray-finned fish belonging to the family Aracanidae, the deepwater boxfishes or temperate boxfishes. The only species in the genus is the rigid boxfish (Caprichthys gymnura), also known as the black-spotted boxfish or ornate pigmy boxfish which is endemic to southwestern Australia.

== Taxonomy ==
Caprichthys was first proposed as a monospecific genus in 1915 by the Australian ichthyologists Allan Riverstone McCulloch and Edgar Ravenswood Waite when they described its only species, Caprichthys gymnura. The type locality of C. gymnura was given as Southwestern Australia. The exact type localities were given as Doubtful Island Bay at 20 to 25 fathoms (120 to 150 ft; 37 to 46 m) and between Cape Naturaliste and Geraldton.

=== Etymology ===
Caprichthys compounds capros, meaning "wild boar", with ichthys, which means "fish", the first part relates this taxon to the genera Capropygia and Anoplocapros, although it is distinguished from those taxa by having a "naked tail". The specific name, gymnura, means "naked tail", an allusion to the absence of any bands of bony scales on the caudal peduncle.

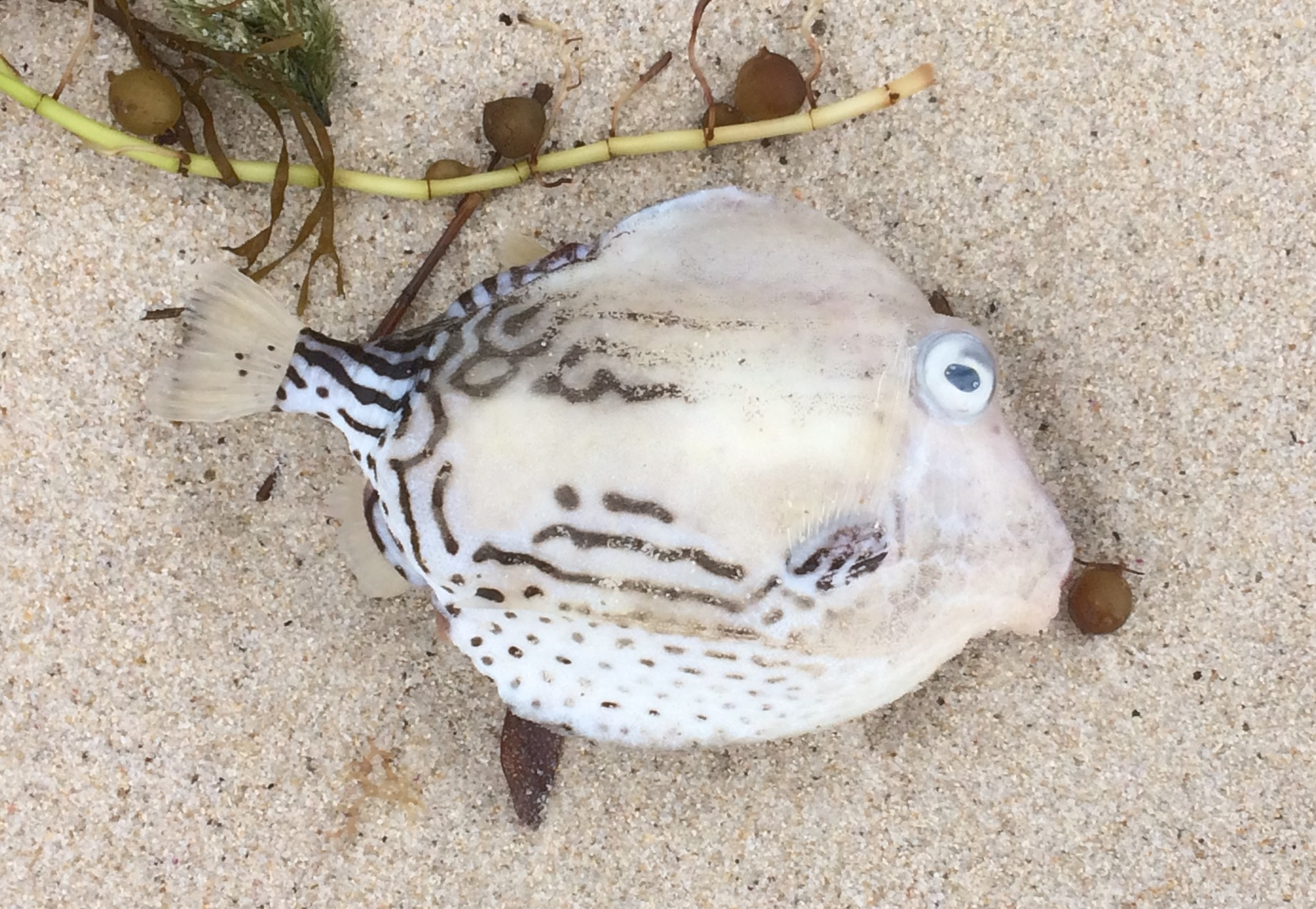
Adult

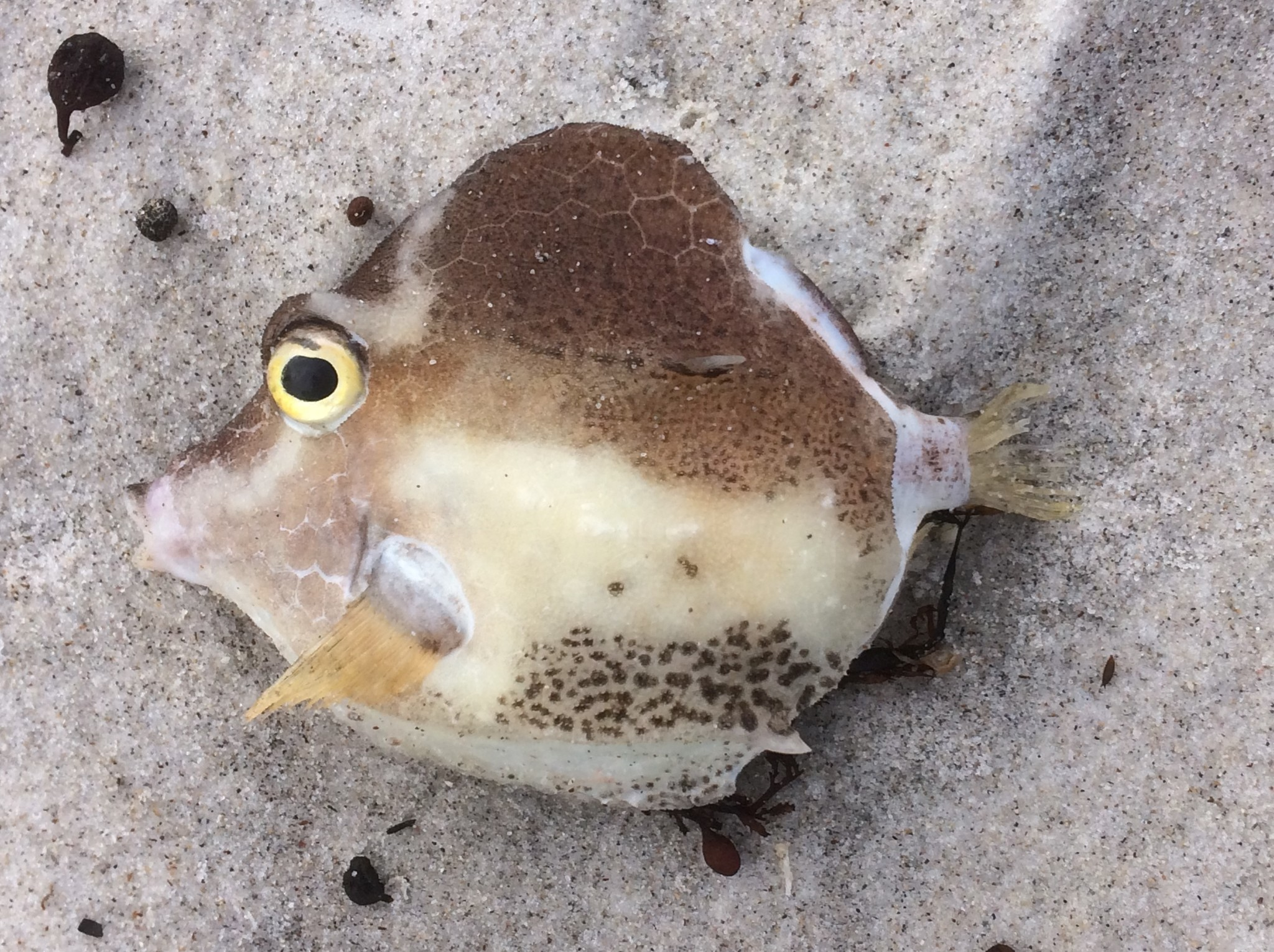
Juvenile

== Description ==
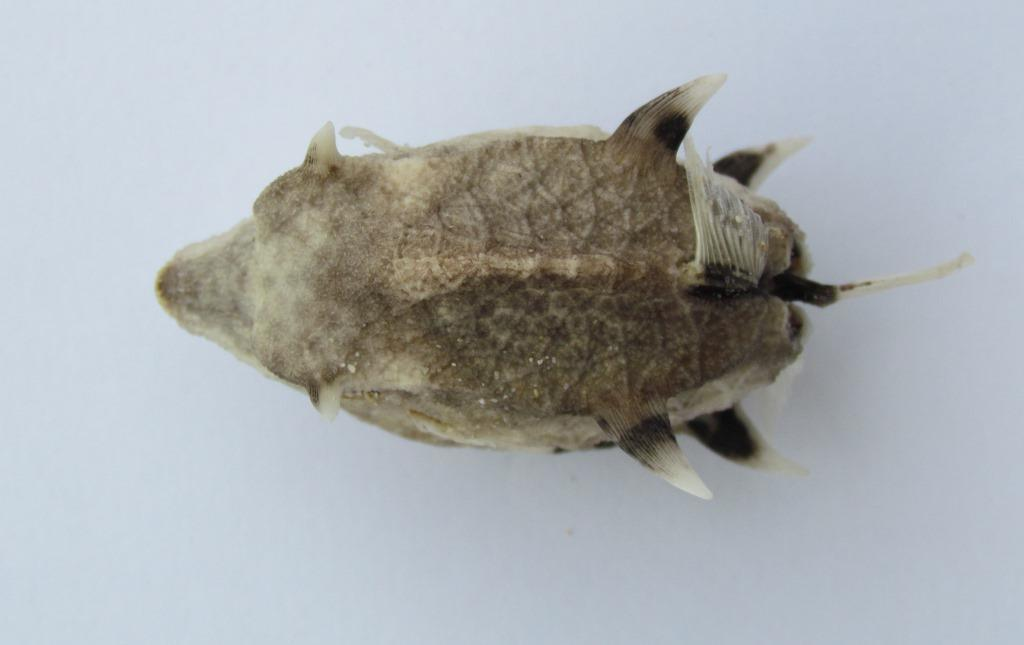
Dorsal view, showing spines

Caprichthys has a short, round body which is deep and has a nearly hexagonal cross section with ridges on the midline of the back and belly and two ridges, an upper and a lower one, on the flanks. There is sometimes a small flattened spine above each eye. The head is moderately small with a straight dorsal profile. The eyes are small and are set high on the head. The small mouth is set at the end of the snout and has fleshy lips and long curved teeth, each jaw having one row of teeth. The body is encased in a stiff carapace consisting of large, hexagonal scales, each plate being sculpted with fine tubercles which join the scales together. There are no or very few isolated large scales on the caudal peduncle. There is a single dorsal fin, with 12 or 13 soft rays, located far back on the body and has a short base. The anal fin is opposite the dorsal fin and has 12 soft rays. The caudal fin is rounded and the small fan-like pectoral fins contain 12 soft rays. The colour of the males is creamy white to yellowish tan with thick dark sinuous horizontal lines and spots on the back, belly and caudal peduncle. The females have a yellowish tan to creamy white overall colour with very small black spots along the ridges on the flanks close to the bases of the spines.

The rigid boxfish has a maximum published total length of 11 cm (4.3 in).

== Distribution and habitat ==
Caprichthys is endemic to southwestern Australia where it is found in the western part of the Great Australian Bight off the east of Evans Island west around the southwestern coast of Western Australia north to Kalbarri. It is found on offshore reefs and areas of softer sediments, at depths between 40 and 200 m (130 and 660 ft). Individuals collected form tide pools in southern Western Australia are presumed to have been stranded during storms.
