= Kentrocapros spilonotus =

Conservation status
- Data Deficient (IUCN 3.1)

Scientific classification
- Kingdom: Animalia
- Phylum: Chordata
- Class: Actinopterygii
- Order: Tetraodontiformes
- Family: Aracanidae
- Genus: Kentrocapros
- Species: K. spilonotus

Binomial name
- Kentrocapros spilonotus (Gilbert, 1905)

Synonyms
- Aracana spilonota Gilbert, 1905

Species of fish

Kentrocapros spilonotus, the Hawaiian basketfish, is a species of marine ray-finned fish belonging to the family Aracanidae, the temperate boxfishes or deepwater boxfishes. This species is known from two places in the Hawaiian Islands, one near Laysan and the other is the Penguin Bank.

== Taxonomy ==
Kentrocapros spilonotus was first formally described as Aracana spolinota in 1905 by the American ichthyologist Charles Henry Gilbert with its type locality given as Albatross station 3939 near Laysan Island in the Leeward Islands of Hawaii from a depth between 59 and 163 fathoms (354 and 978 ft; 108 and 298 m). In 2006 Keiichi Matsuura examined the known Specimens of A. spilonota and reclassified it into the genus Kentrocapros. The 5th edition of Fishes of the World classifies the genus Kentrocapros in the family Aracanidae which is in the suborder Ostracioidea within the order Tetraodontiformes.

== Etymology ==
Kentrocapros spilonotus is classified within the genus Kentrocapros, a name which combines kentro meaning "thorn" or "spine", a reference to the spiny ridge along the flanks of the type species, K. aculeatus, with capros, meaning "wild boar". This may allude to these fishes being known as seapigs in the 19th Century, probably an allusion to the resemblance of these fishes on a rear view to a pig. The specific name, spilonotus, means "spot-backed" and refers to the brownish-green spotting on the back and upper body of this fish.

== Description ==
Kentrocapros spilonotus has between 9 and 11 soft rays in its dorsal fin and between 9 and 12 on the anal fin. There is a stiffcarapace which covers all of the body except the caudal peduncle, gill slit and the bases of the fins. The carapace has three ridges on each side of the body. The lower ridges have a pair of recurved spines in its centre and the upper ridge has smaller recurved spines, also in its centre. The preserved specimens are brown in colour with numerous darker spots on the upper carapace with pale fins. This species has a maximum published standard length of 10.6 cm (4.2 in).

== Distribution and habitat ==
Kentrocapros spilonotus has been recorded from just two localities in the Hawaiian Islands, one near Laysan Island and the other on the Penguin Bank near Molokai and has been found at depths between 106 to 293 m (348 to 961 ft).
