= Kentrocapros flavimaculatus =

Scientific classification
- Kingdom: Animalia
- Phylum: Chordata
- Class: Actinopterygii
- Order: Tetraodontiformes
- Family: Aracanidae
- Genus: Kentrocapros
- Species: K. flavimaculatus

Binomial name
- Kentrocapros flavimaculatus Matsuura

Species of fish

Kentrocapros flavimaculatus is a species of marine ray-finned fish belonging to the family Aracanidae, the temperate boxfishes or deepwater boxfishes. This species is found in the southwestern Pacific Ocean around New Zealand and was first formally described in 2023.

== Taxonomy ==
Kentrocapros flavimaculatus was first formally described in 2023 by the Japanese ichthyologist Toshiji Kamohara with its type locality given as Macauley Island, Rangitāhua Kermadec Islands in New Zealand. The 5th edition of Fishes of the World classifies the genus Kentrocapros in the family Aracanidae which is in the suborder Ostracioidea within the order Tetraodontiformes.

== Etymology ==
Kentrocapros flavimaculatus is classified within the genus Kentrocapros, a name which combines kentro meaning "thorn" or "spine", a reference to the spiny ridge along the flanks of the type species, K. aculeatus, with capros, meaning "wild boar". This may allude to these fishes being known as seapigs in the 19th Century, probably an allusion to the resemblance of these fishes on a rear view to a pig. The specific name, flavimaculatus, means "yellow spotted" and refers to the numerous yellow spots on this fish's body.

== Description ==
Kentrocapros flavimaculatus has 10 soft rays in the dorsal fin, 9 in the anal fin and 12 in the pectoral fin. The body is encased in a hard carapace, except for the head and caudal peduncle. The carapace has three ridges on each side, with a spine in the centre of the uppermost ridge on each side, and the carapace is made up of hexagonal sculptured plate-like scales which are “stitched” together. The body is marked along its flanks by yellow spots on a dark grey background, this fades towards the belly. The lips are red. The largest specimen had a standard length of 11.4 cm (4.5 in).

== Distribution and habitat ==
Kentrocapros flavimaculatus Is known from only two specimens, the holotype from the Kermadec Islands and the paratype from the Tasman Sea 700 km (430 mi) north of Cape Reinga on the North Island of New Zealand. These specimens were collected at depths between 145 and 172 m (476 and 564 ft).
