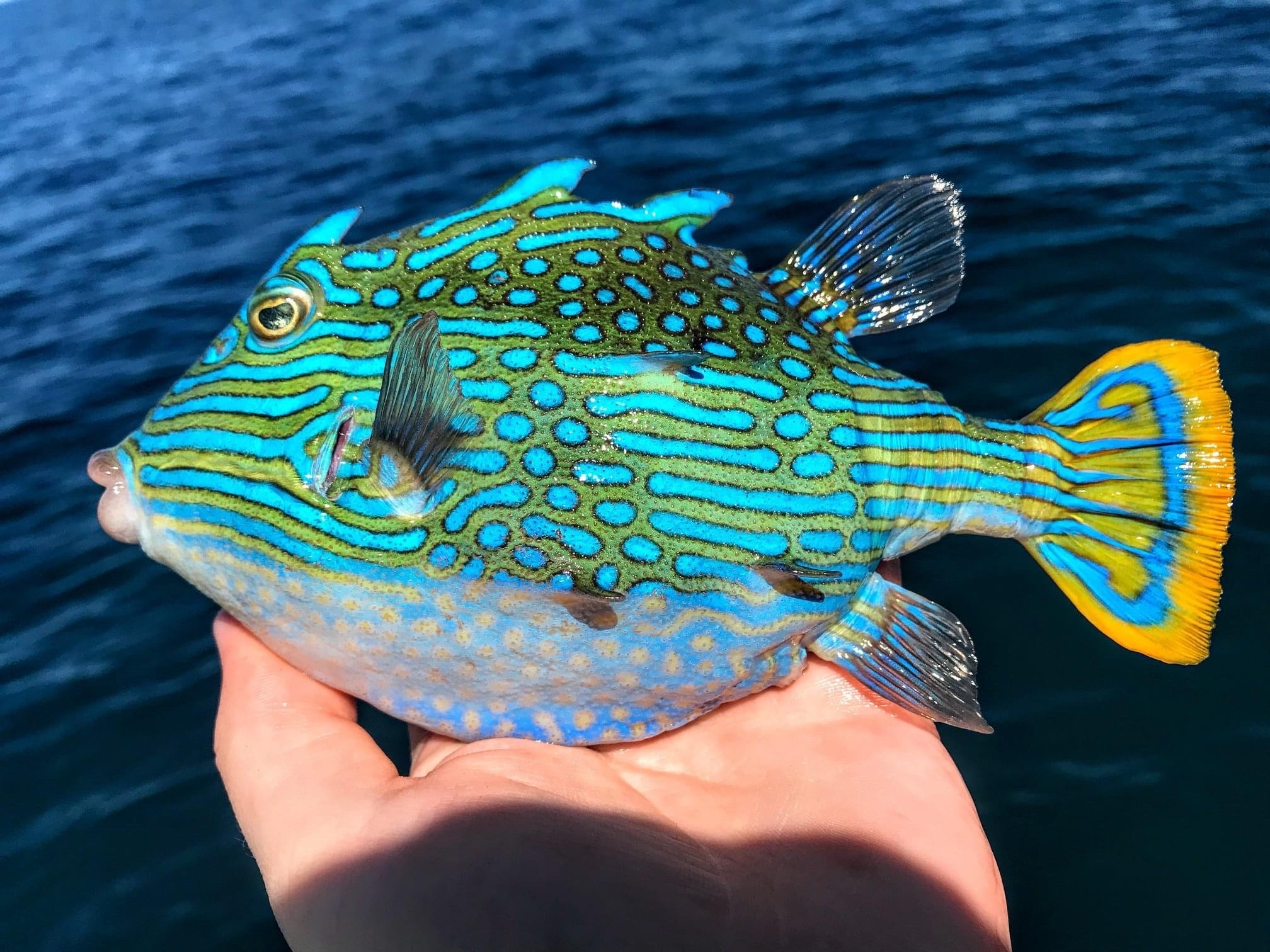
- Male
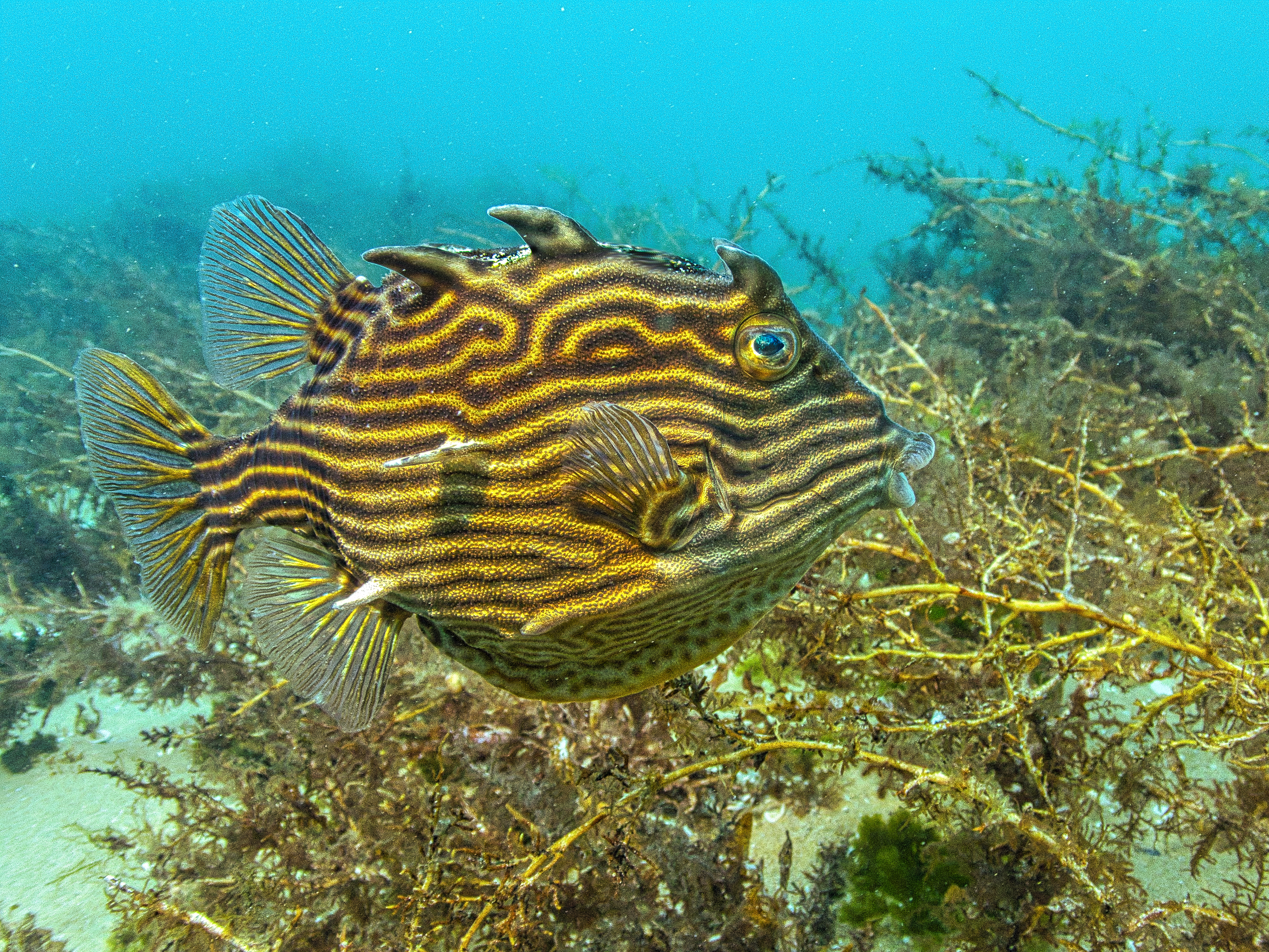
- Female

Conservation status
- Least Concern (IUCN 3.1)

Scientific classification
- Kingdom: Animalia
- Phylum: Chordata
- Class: Actinopterygii
- Division: Teleostei
- Order: Tetraodontiformes
- Family: Aracanidae
- Genus: Aracana
- Species: A. aurita

Binomial name
- Aracana aurita (Shaw, 1798)

Synonyms
- List: Ostracion auritus Shaw, 1798; Acarana aurita (Shaw, 1798); Ostracion striatus Shaw, 1804; Ostracion tobinii Donovan, 1824; Ostracion lineata Gray, 1839; Ostracion spilogaster Richardson, 1840; Aracana spilogaster spinosissima McCulloch & Waite, 1915; Aracana spilogaster angustata McCulloch & Waite, 1915

= Aracana aurita =

Species of fish

Aracana aurita, the Shaw's cowfish, painted boxfish, southern cowfish or striped cowfish, is a species of marine ray-finned fish belonging to the family Aracanidae, the deepwater boxfishes or temperate boxfishes. This species is endemic to the seas off southern Australia.

== Taxonomy ==
Aracana auritia was first formally described in 1798 as Ostracion auritus by the Irish biologist George Shaw with its type locality given as the "Islands of the Pacific Ocean", thought to be Tasmania. In 1838 John Edward Gray proposed a monotypic subgenus of Ostracion which he named Aracana, in 1866 Pieter Bleeker formally designated O. aurita as the type species of Aracana.

The 5th edition of Fishes of the World classifies this genus in the family Aracanidae which is in the suborder Ostracioidea within the order Tetraodontiformes.

== Etymology ==
Aracana aurita is classified in the genus Aracana, a name which was variously spelt by Gray as Acarana in 1833, Acerana in 1835 and Aracana in 1838. The 1838 name is the one used because it has become the most commonly used name. Grey did not explain the name but in 1835 he referred to boxfishes as "parrotfishes", so the name may refer the aracanga (Macrocercus aracanga), an old name for the scarlet macaw (Ara macao). The specific name aurita, means "eared", an allusion to the spines resembling horns above each eye, these horns together looking similar to a pair of ears.

== Distribution and habitat ==
Aracana aurita is endemic to southern Australia from Newcastle, New South Wales south to Tasmania west to Kalbarri, Western Australia. They are found in seagrass beds and offshore rocky reefs in sheltered waters in bays, harbours and inlets at depths between 10 and 160 m (33 and 525 ft).

== Description ==
Aracana aurita has 10 or 11 soft rays in the dorsal fin and in the anal fin while there are 11 or 12 soft rays in both the pectoral fin and caudal fin. A stiff, boxy carapace made up of sculptured bony plates girds the body. This carapace has large recurved spines along its ridges. The dorsal and anal fins are set very far back on the body and are opposite each other. The bony plates on the caudal peduncle are less well developed than the carapace but they almost form a complete band in adults. The lines on the snout are nearly horizontal. They show sexual dimorphism in the colouration with the males having bright colouration with light blue wavy lines and spots on an orange background colour. The females and juveniles have a light orange to light brown overall colour marked with irregular brown and white sinuous lines or stripes. This species has a maximum published total length of 20 cm (7.9 in).

== Biology ==
Aracana aurita prey on benthic invertebrates which they expose by blowing a jet of water into the substrate.
