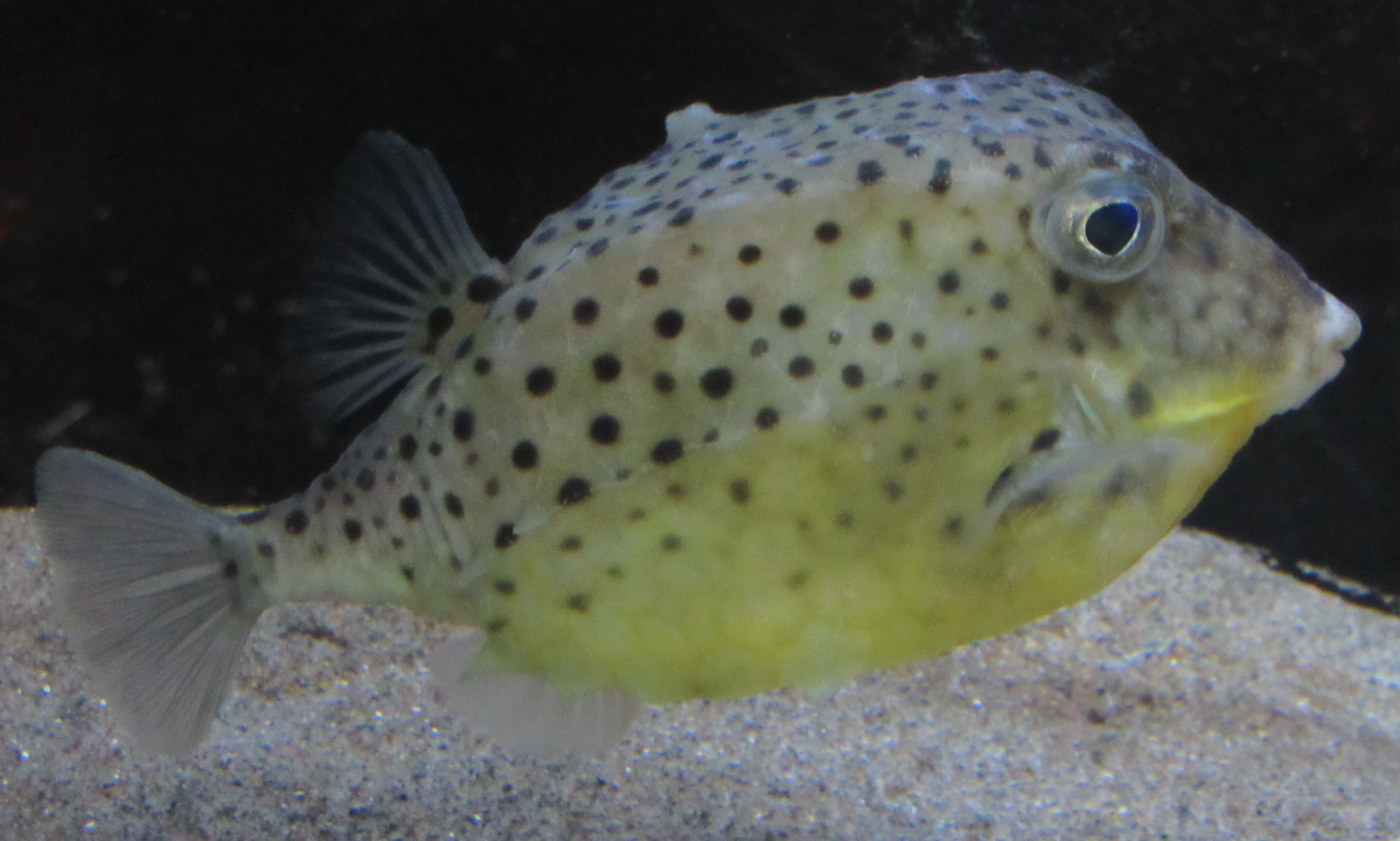
- Kentrocapros aculeatus (Houttuyn)

Scientific classification
- Kingdom: Animalia
- Phylum: Chordata
- Class: Actinopterygii
- Order: Tetraodontiformes
- Family: Aracanidae
- Genus: Kentrocapros; Kaup, 1855

Type species
- Ostracion hexagonus Thunberg, 1787

Synonyms
- Aracanostracion J. L. B. Smith, 1949; Molaracana Y. Le Danois, 1961

= Kentrocapros =

Genus of fishes

Kentrocapros is a genus of marine ray-finned fishes belonging to the family Aracanidae, the deepwater boxfishes or temperate boxfishes. These fishes are found in the coastal waters of the Indian and Pacific Oceans.

== Taxonomy ==
Kentrocarpos was first proposed as a monospecific subgenus of Aracana in 1855 by the German naturalist Johann Jakob Kaup with Ostracion hexagonus as its only species. O. hexagonus was originally described in 1787 by Carl Peter Thunberg with its type locality given as Japan. This was later found to be a synonym of O. cubicus aculeatus, described by Martinus Houttuyn in 1782 from Nagasaki. The 5th edition of Fishes of the World classifies this genus in the family Aracanidae which is in the suborder Ostracioidea within the order Tetraodontiformes.

== Etymology ==
Kentrocapros combines kentro meaning "thorn" or "spine", a reference to the spiny ridge along the flanks of the type species, with capros, meaning "wild boar". This may allude to these fishes being known as seapigs in the 19th Century, probably an allusion to the resemblance of these fishes on a rear view to a pig.

== Species ==
Kentrocapros currently has six recognised species within it:

- Kentrocapros aculeatus (Houttuyn, 1782) (Itomaki basketfish)
- Kentrocapros eco (Phillipps, 1932)
- Kentrocapros flavofasciatus (Kamohara, 1938) (Yellowstriped boxfish)
- Kentrocapros flavimaculatus Matsuura, 2023 (Yellowspotted boxfish)
- Kentrocapros rosapinto (J. L. B. Smith, 1949) (Basketfish)
- Kentrocapros spilonotus (C. H. Gilbert, 1905) (Hawaiian basketfish)

In the paper describing K. flavimaculatus Keiichi Matsuura states that the holotype of K. eco is in too poor condition to correctly identify it to species and that this taxon should be regarded as a nomen dubium.

== Characteristics ==
Kentrocarpos deepwater boxfishes are distinguished from other genera in the family Aracanidae by having a hexagonal cross section to the body with the carapce having six longitudinal ridges, three on each side of the fish, one on the lower body, one in the middle of the side and one on the upper body. There are 9 branched rays in the caudal fin. These are small fishes with the largest species being K. flavofasciatus which has a maximum published standard length of 14.6 cm (5.7 in) while the smallest is K. spilonota with a maximum published standard length of 10.4 cm (4.1 in).

== Distribution and habitat ==
Kentrocarpos deepwater boxfishes are found in the Indo-West Pacific where they occur in temperate and tropical waters at depths between 5 and 300 m (16 and 984 ft).
