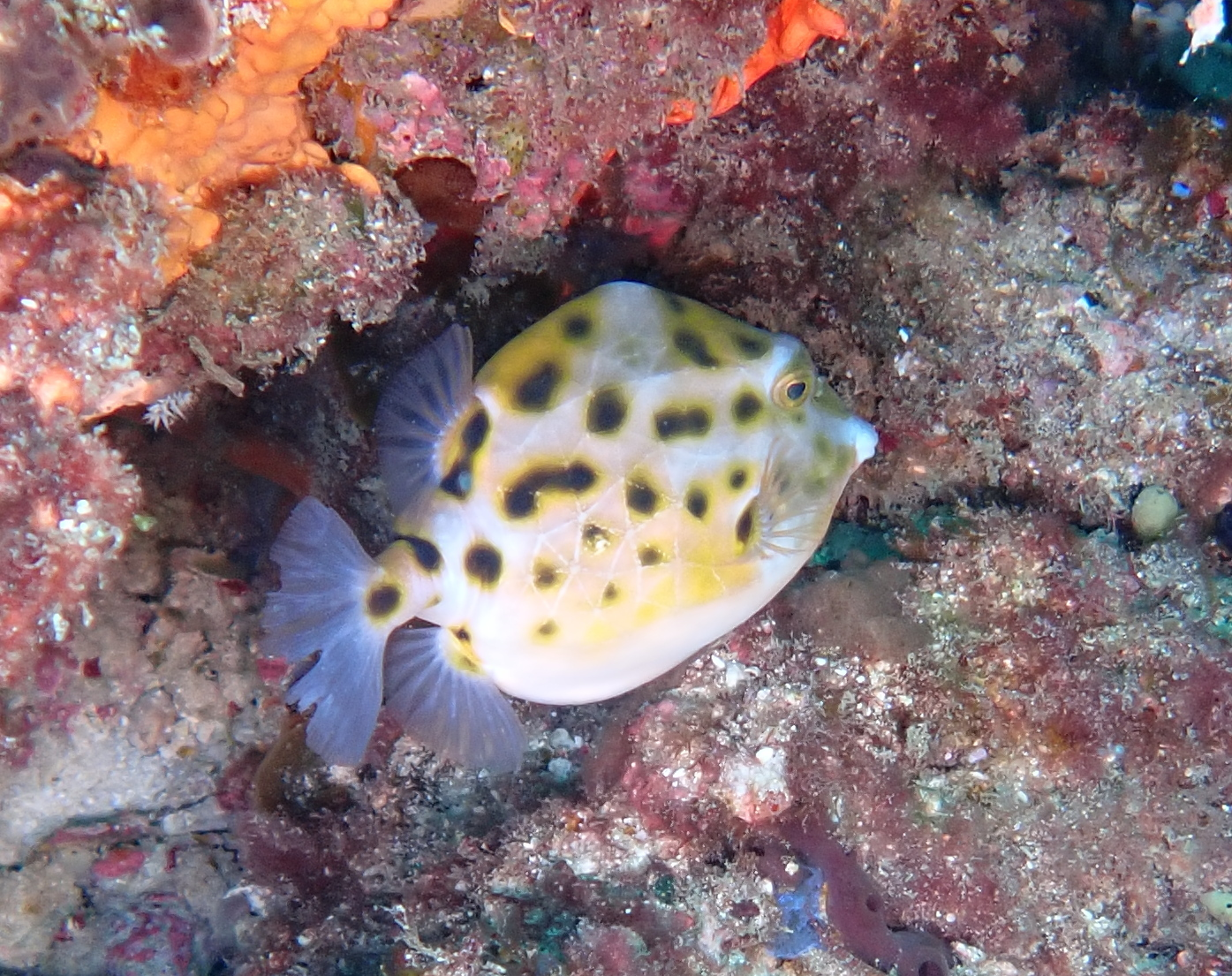

Conservation status
- Least Concern (IUCN 3.1)

Scientific classification
- Kingdom: Animalia
- Phylum: Chordata
- Class: Actinopterygii
- Division: Teleostei
- Order: Tetraodontiformes
- Family: Aracanidae
- Genus: Anoplocapros
- Species: A. amygdaloides

Binomial name
- Anoplocapros amygdaloides Fraser-Brunner, 1941

= Western smooth boxfish =

Species of fish

The Western smooth boxfish (Anoplocapros amygdaloides), also known as the blue boxfish or robust boxfish, is a species of marine ray-finned fish belonging to the family Aracanidae, the deep water boxfishes or temperate boxfishes. This fish is endemic to the seas of southwestern Australia.

== Taxonomy ==
The Western smooth boxfish was first formally described in 1941 by the British ichthyologist Alec Fraser-Brunner with its type locality given as Australia.

=== Etymology ===
The Western smooth boxfish is in the genus Anoplocapros, a name which compounds anoplos, meaning "unarmed", with capros, which means a "wild boar". The unarmed part refers to the lack of spines, while the allusion to wild boars may refer to these fishes being known as seapigs in the 19th century, probably an allusion to the resemblance of these fishes on a rear view to a pig. The specific name, amygdaloides, suffixes -oides, meaning "having the form of" onto amygdalus, the name of the subgenus of Prunus which includes the peach, a reference to the resemblance of the carapace to the large stone of a peach.

== Description ==
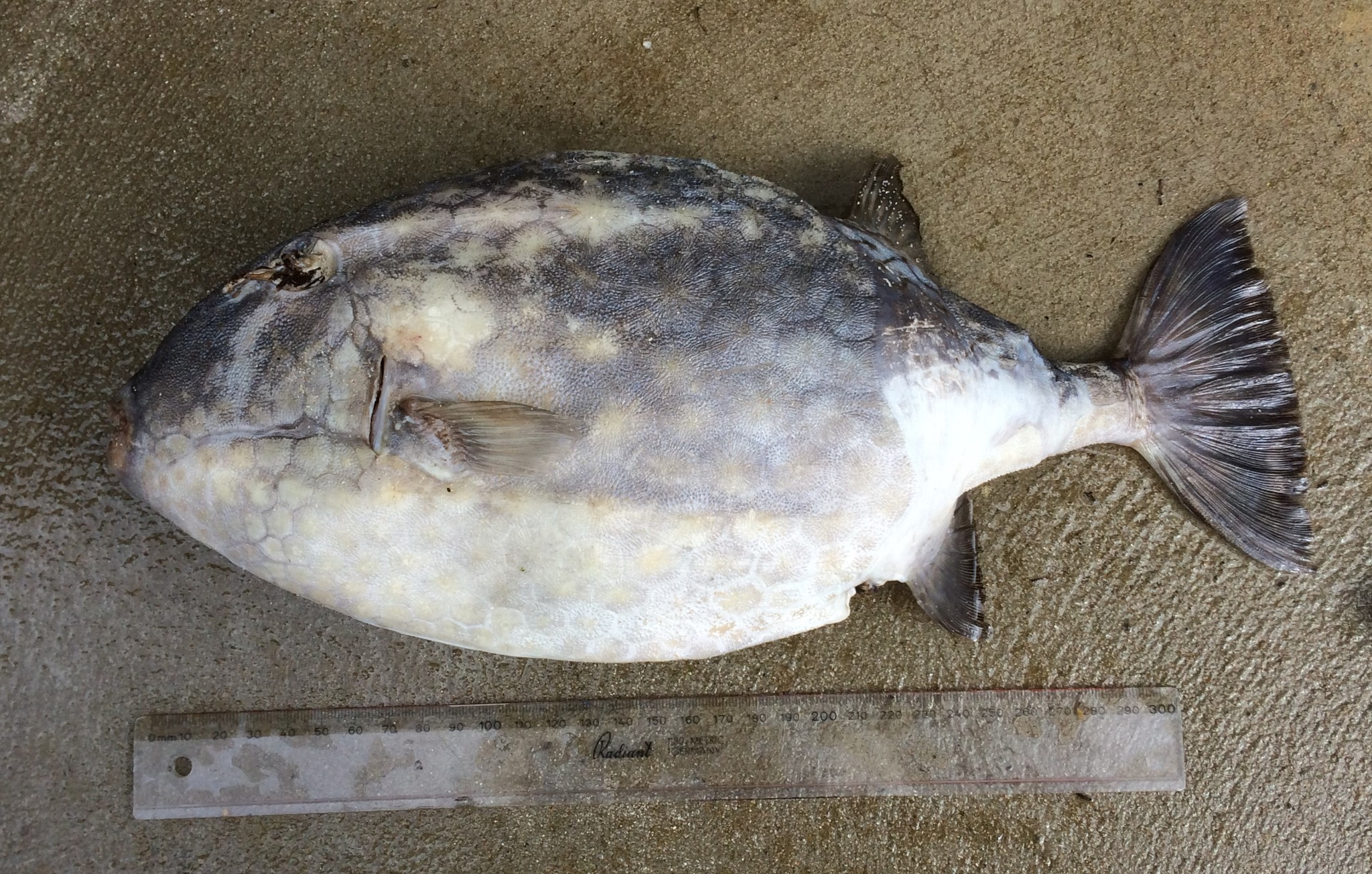
Dead specimen with ruler for scale

The Western smooth boxfish has 10 soft rays in its dorsal fin, 9 or 10 in its anal fin, 12 in its pectoral fin and 11 in its caudal fin. The dorsal profile between the snout and the start of the dorsal ridge is straight. There are two series of bony plate-like scales around the caudal peduncle, the front plate is broken but the rear one is complete, both these rings have the plate-like scales are rough to the touch because they are covered in tubercles. The overall colour of the body is yellowish-white tined with brown above the lower ridge along the flanks, with the back and flanks have a number of almost black spots. The fins are translucent. In larger males the overall colour changes to bluish, paler ventrally, with brown blotches, lines and spots and light blue fins. This species has a maximum published total length of 30 cm (12 in).

== Distribution and habitat ==
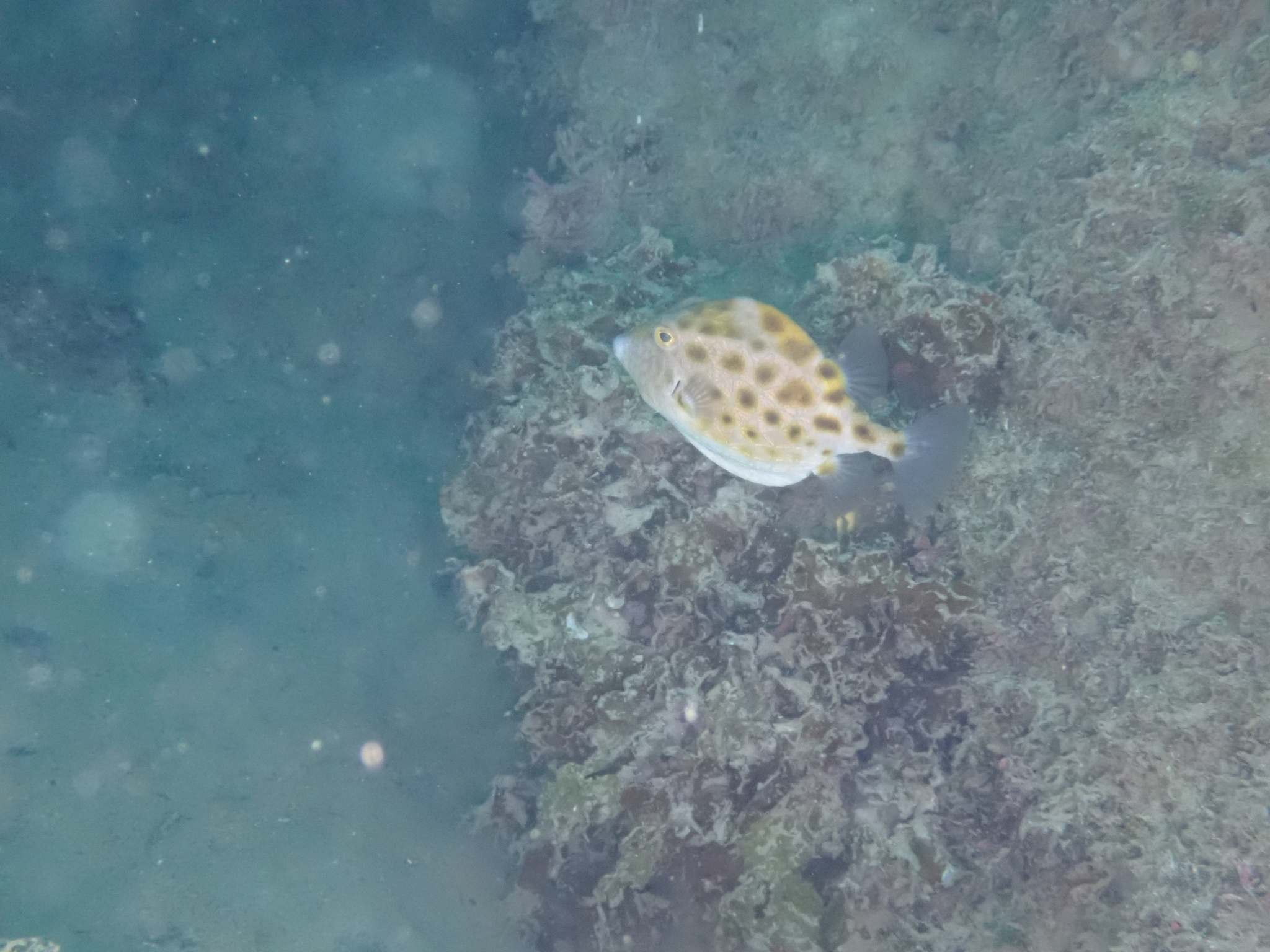
In Western Australia

The Western Smooth boxfish is endemic to southwestern Australia where it is found from the eastern Great Australian Bight in South Australia to Shark Bay in Western Australia. Here it occurs at depths down to 100 m (330 ft) on offshore reefs, seagrass beds and on trawling grounds.

== Biology ==
The Western smooth boxfish feeds on benthic invertebrates. There are separate sexes and the eggs and larvae are pelagic. Although this species does not have toxic flesh it can exude a toxic mucus which can kill other fish, this mucus can kill the boxfish too if it is exposed to it for too long. Where and how this mucus is produced is not known.
