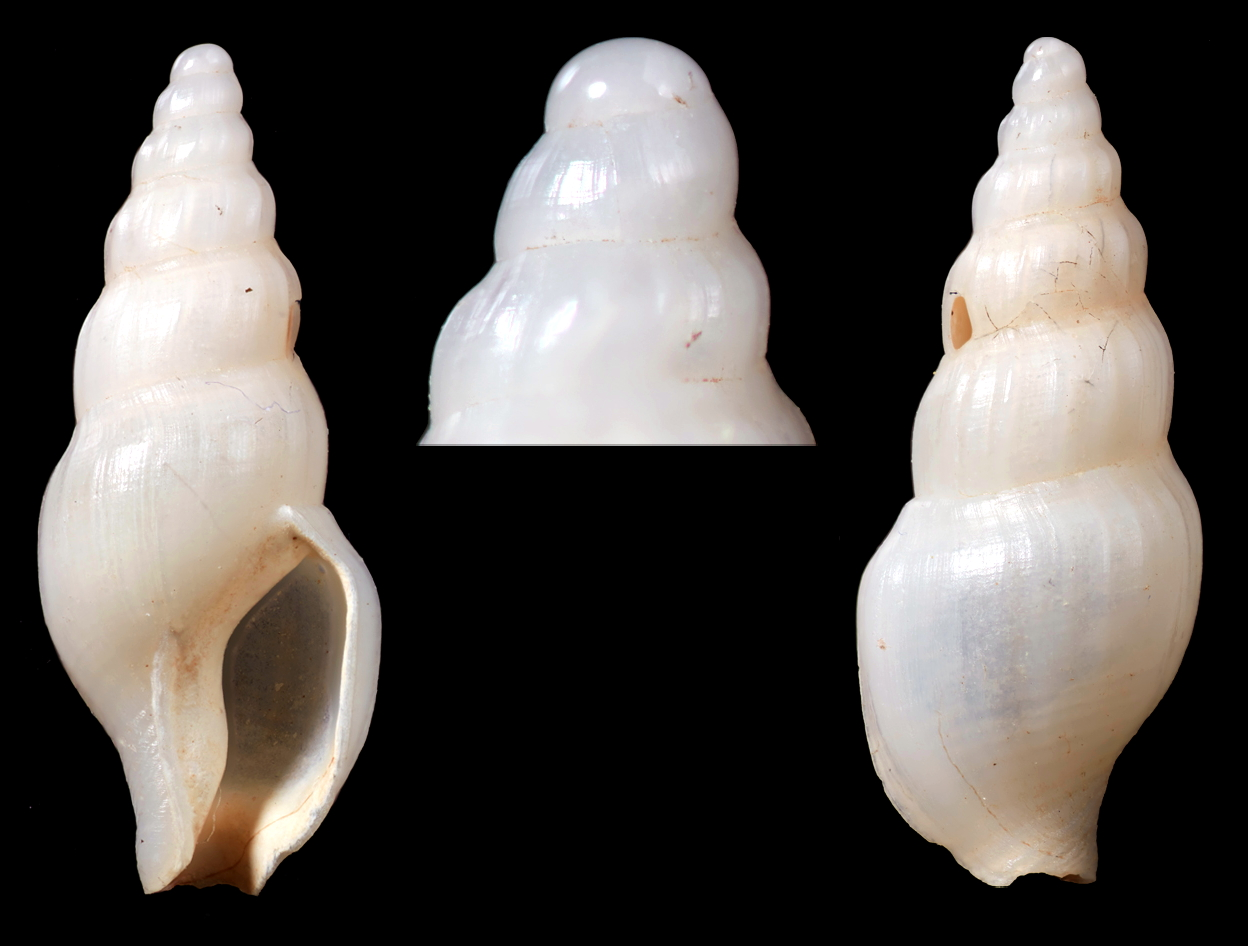
- Shell of Anachis corbariae (holotype at MNHN, Paris)

Scientific classification
- Kingdom: Animalia
- Phylum: Mollusca
- Class: Gastropoda
- Subclass: Caenogastropoda
- Order: Neogastropoda
- Family: Columbellidae
- Genus: Anachis
- Species: A. corbariae

Binomial name
- Anachis corbariae K. Monsecour & D. Monsecour, 2024

= Anachis corbariae =

Species of gastropod

Anachis corbariae is a species of sea snail in the family Columbellidae, the dove snails.

== Description ==
The length of the shell attains 9.3 mm, with the shape of a spiral.

== Distribution ==
This species occurs off the South coast of Madagascar in Walters Shoals.
