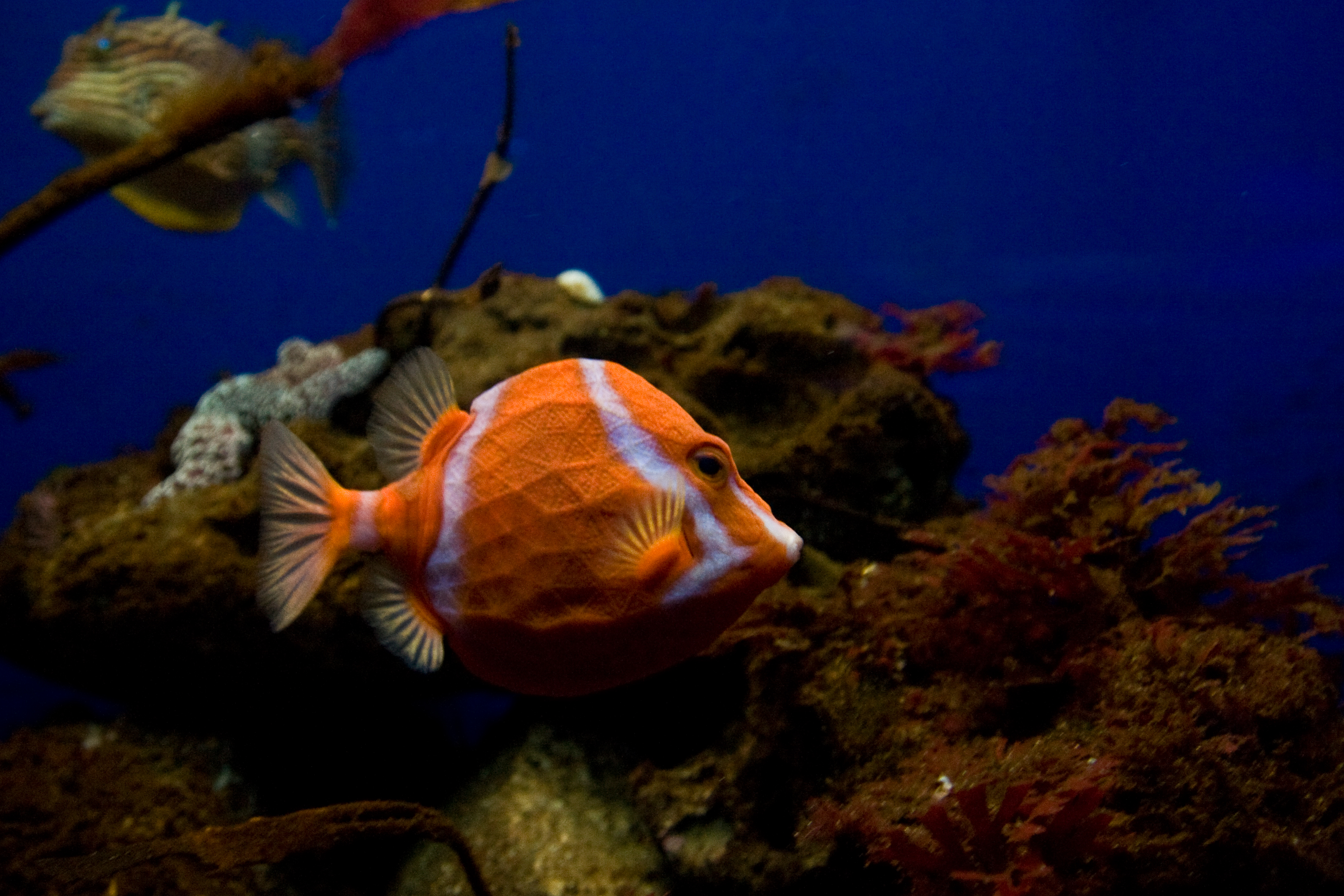

Conservation status
- Least Concern (IUCN 3.1)

Scientific classification
- Kingdom: Animalia
- Phylum: Chordata
- Class: Actinopterygii
- Order: Tetraodontiformes
- Family: Aracanidae
- Genus: Anoplocapros
- Species: A. lenticularis

Binomial name
- Anoplocapros lenticularis Richardson, 1841

Synonyms
- Ostracion lenticularis Richardson, 1841; Acerana grayi Kaup, 1855; Anoplocapros gibbosus McCulloch & Waite, 1915

= Anoplocapros lenticularis =

Species of fish

Anoplocapros lenticularis, the white-barred boxfish, flame boxfish, high-backed boxfish, humpback boxfish, humpty dumpty or smooth boxfish, is a species of marine ray-finned fish belonging to the family Aracanidae, the deepwater boxfishes or temperate boxfishes. This fish is endemic to the seas of southern and western Australia.

== Taxonomy ==
Anoplocapros lenticularis was first formally described as Ostracion lenticularis in 1841 by the Scottish naval surgeon, Arctic explorer and naturalist John Richardson with its type locality given as Australia. In 1855 Johann Jakob Kaup proposed a new subgenus of Aracana which he called Anoplocapros, in 1865 Pieter Bleeker designated O. lenticularis as the type species of Anoplocapros. The 5th edition of Fishes of the World classifies the genus Anoplocapros within the family Aracanidae within the suborder Ostracioidea within the order Tetraodontiformes.

== Etymology ==
Anoplocapros lenticularis is in the genus Anoplocapros, a name which compounds anoplos, meaning "unarmed", with capros, which means a "wild boar". The unarmed part refers to the lack of spines, while the allusion to wild boars may refer to these fishes being known as sea pigs in the 19th Century, probably an allusion to the resemblance of these fishes on a rear view to a pig. The specific name, lenticularis, means "like a lentil", in 1844 Richardson said that this referred to the "wart-like umbo" at the centre of each plate-like scale.

== Description ==
Anoplocapros lenticularis has between 9 and 11 soft rays in its dorsal fin, 10 or 11 in its anal fin, 12 in its pectoral fin and 11 in its caudal fin. It has a deep body which is armoured with a bony carapace made up of plate-like scales. There are two series of bony plate-like scales around the caudal peduncle, the front plate is broken but the rear one is complete, both these rings have the plate-like scales are rough to the touch because they are covered in tubercles. The adults have a concave snout with the eyes located high on the head. The back and belly are keeled and in males the dorsal profile is higher than that of females. The small juveniles have a more rounded shape. The overall colour of the adult males is yellowish-orange to brownish-orange or reddish with wide light grey to whitish bands on r=the flank, one running from th eye to the lips, a second the top of the dorsal keel to the cheek and a third along the rear edge of the bony carapace. The females are similar but are lighter in colour and have irregular black lines and spots on the upper body. The juveniles are similar to the females bit have a greater number of spots. The white-barred boxfish has a maximum published total length of 33 cm (13 in).

== Distribution and habitat ==
Anoplocapros lenticularis is endemic to the waters off western and southern Australia where it is found from the Houtman Abrolhos in Western Australia to Western Port in Victoria at depth down to 250 m (820 ft)on offshore reefs and around jetties.

== Biology ==
Anoplocapros lenticularis preys on invertebrates, particularly crustaceans. They have separate sexes and their eggs and larvae are pelagic.
