= Humpty Dumpty (disambiguation) =

Humpty Dumpty is a nursery rhyme and the name of its principal character.

Humpty Dumpty may also refer to:

== Art, entertainment, and media ==
=== Music ===
- Humpty Dumpty LSD, a compilation album by Butthole Surfers
- "Humpty Dumpty", a song by Aimee Mann from Lost in Space
- "Humpty Dumpty", a song by AJR from OK Orchestra
- "The Ballad of Persse O'Reilly", recorded by the Dubliners with Ronnie Drew as "Humpty Dumpty"

=== Television ===
- "Humpty Dumpty" (House), an episode of TV series House
- "Humpty Dumpty!", an episode of the television series Teletubbies

=== Other media ===
- Humpty Dumpty (comics), a fictional character from DC Comics
- Humpty Dumpty (magazine), a children's magazine
- Humpty Dumpty (pinball), a pinball machine

== Other uses ==
- Humpty Dumpty Snack Foods, a snack food manufacturer
- Humpty Dumpty, a colloquial name for the taxon Anoplocapros lenticularis
- GER Class T19 locomotive rebuilt 1902 to 1904, nicknamed "Humpty-Dumpties" due to their appearance
