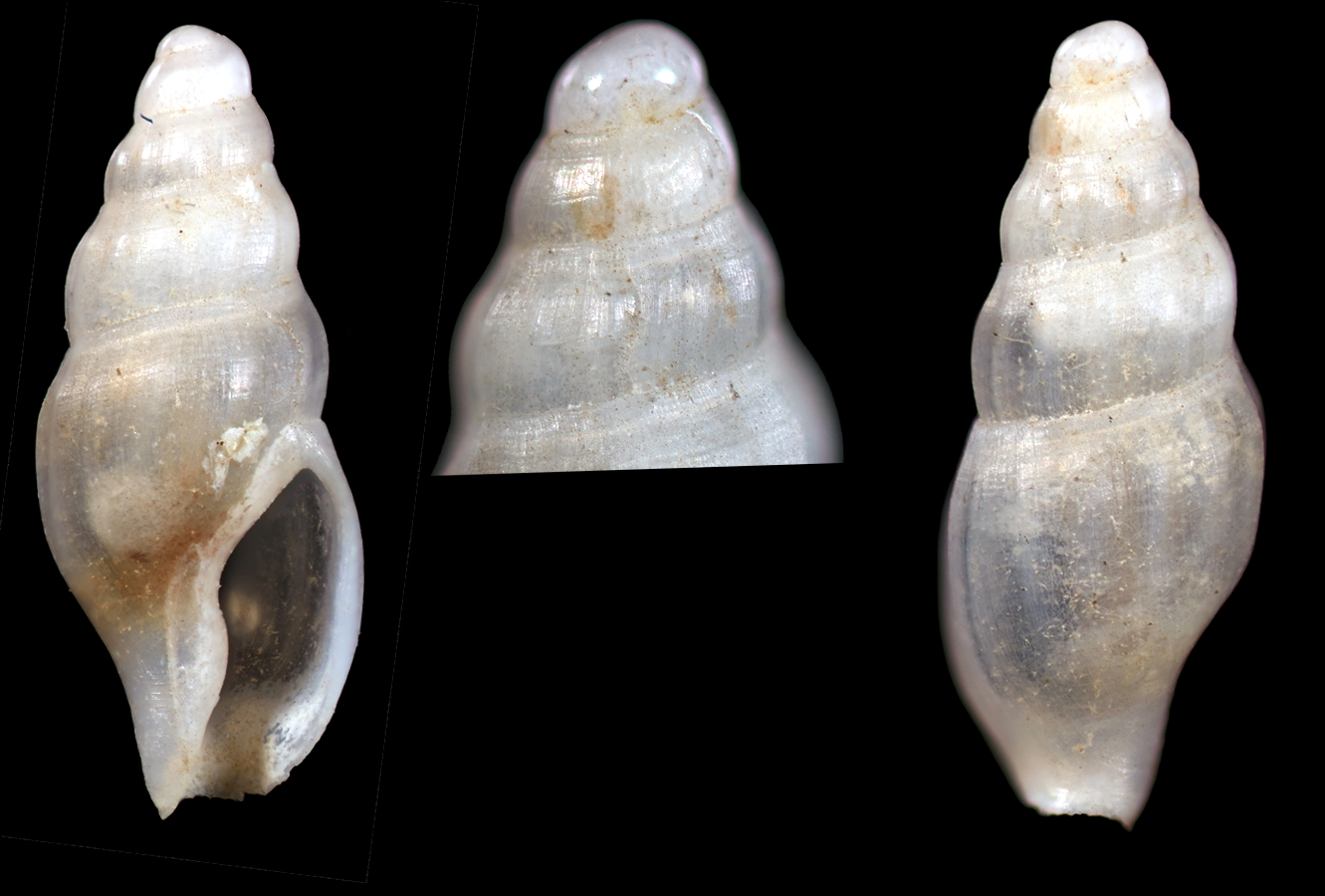
- Shell of Anachis wareni (holotype at MNHN, Paris)

Scientific classification
- Kingdom: Animalia
- Phylum: Mollusca
- Class: Gastropoda
- Subclass: Caenogastropoda
- Order: Neogastropoda
- Family: Columbellidae
- Genus: Anachis
- Species: A. wareni

Binomial name
- Anachis wareni K. Monsecour & D. Monsecour, 2024

= Anachis wareni =

Species of gastropod

Anachis wareni is a species of sea snail in the family Columbellidae, the dove snails.

== Description ==
The length of the shell is 4.4 mm.

== Distribution ==
This species is found in the Indian Ocean off Walters Shoals.
