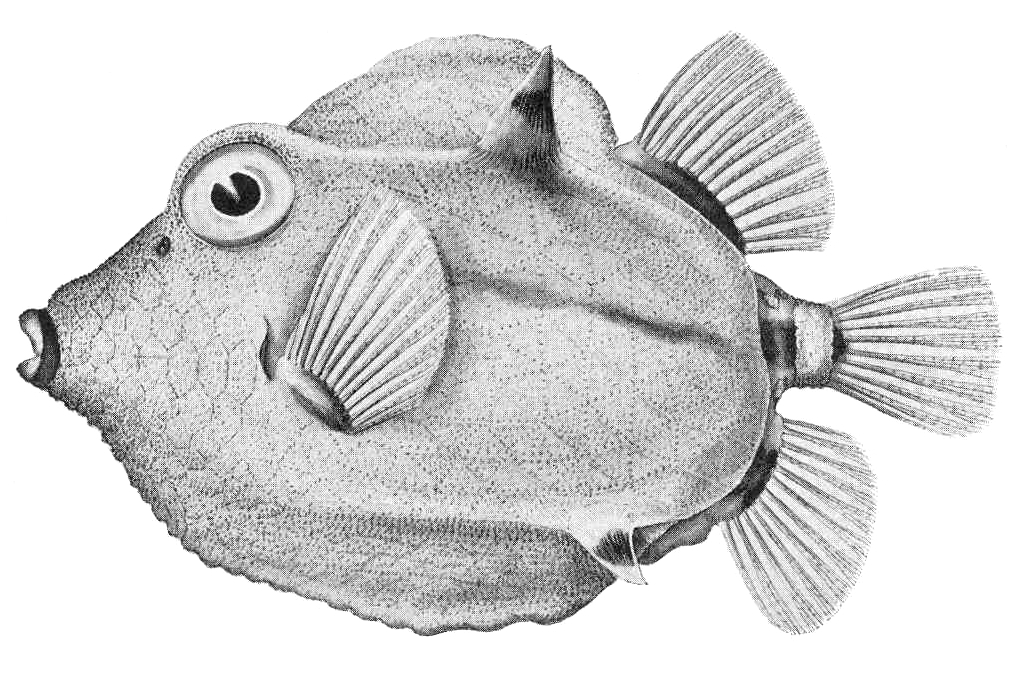

Conservation status
- Least Concern (IUCN 3.1)

Scientific classification
- Kingdom: Animalia
- Phylum: Chordata
- Class: Actinopterygii
- Order: Tetraodontiformes
- Family: Aracanidae
- Genus: Capropygia; Kaup, 1855
- Species: C. unistriata

Binomial name
- Capropygia unistriata (Kaup, 1855)

Synonyms
- Aracana unistriata Kaup, 1855

= Capropygia =

Monospecific genus of fish

Capropygia is a monospecific genus of marine ray-finned fish belonging to the family Aracanidae, the deepwater boxfishes or temperate boxfishes. The only species in the genus is the black-banded pigmy boxfish (Capropygia unistriata), also known as the spiny boxfish which is endemic to southern Australia.

== Taxonomy ==
Capropygia was first proposed as a subgenus of Aracana in 1855 by the German zoologist Johann Jakob Kaup when he described its only species Aracana (Capropygia) unistriata. Kaup did not give a type locality for A. unistriata but it is likely to be southeasern Australia. The 5th edition of Fishes of the World classifies this taxon in the family Aracanidae which is in the suborder Ostracioidea within the order Tetraodontiformes.

== Etymology ==
Capropygia compounds capros, meaning "wild boar", with pygia, which means "rump" or "buttocks", Kaup described it as "Viewed from behind, it resembles the rear part of a well-fed pig". The specific name unistriata, means "one stripe", an allusion to the dark stripe running from the eye to the tail.

== Description ==
Capropygia has a deep body is short and has a circular profile and a rather hexagonal cross section, with ridges on the back and belly and on the upper and lower flanks. The lower flank ridge has a flattened spine at the rear and the upper flank ridge has a large spine at its middle. The moderately small head has a straight dorsal profile with a small terminal mouth and eyes positioned high on the head. The mouth has fleshy lips with a single row of closely set curved teeth in each jaw. The body is encased in a stiff carapace consisting of large, hexagonal scales, each plate being sculpted with fine tubercles which join the scales together. The caudal peduncle has a rear ring of these scales and some isolated scales at its front. There is a single dorsal fin, with 12 soft rays, located far back on the body and has a short base. The anal fin is opposite the dorsal fin and has 12 or 13 soft rays. The caudal fin is rounded with 11 soft rays and the small fan-like pectoral fins contain 12 soft rays. The overall color is pale yellowish-brown to tan or greyish-brown, typically with a wide black stripe along the flanks, in some specimens this may be indistinct, black lips, and the ridge spines and fin bases have black blotches or are surrounded with black. The black-banded pigmy boxfish has a maximum published total length of 12 cm (4.7 in).

== Distribution and habitat ==
Capropygia is endemic to southern Australia where it is found from Cape Conran, Victoria west to Rottnest Island in Western Australia. It is found on deeper reefs on the continental shelf,at depths between 60 and 200 m (200 and 660 ft). It is occasionally washed into inshore waters by storms, when it can appear in tidal pools.
