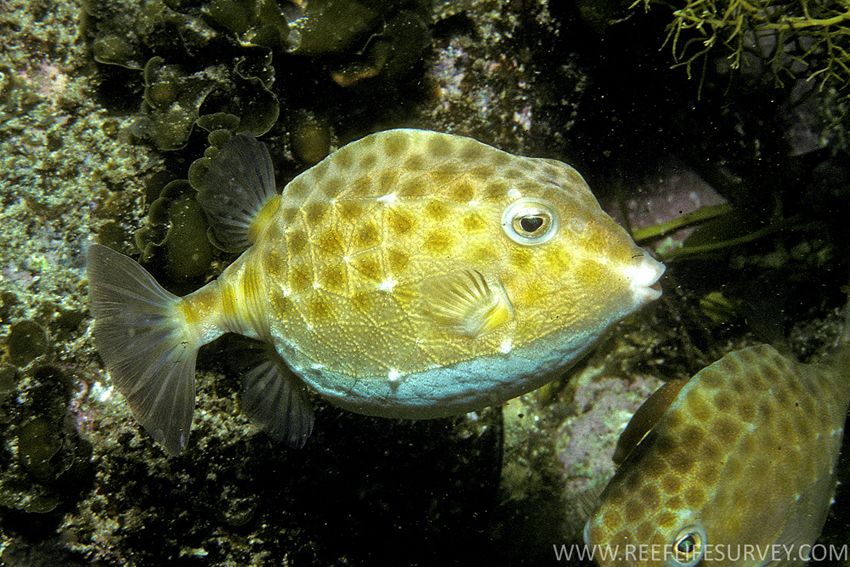

Conservation status
- Least Concern (IUCN 3.1)

Scientific classification
- Kingdom: Animalia
- Phylum: Chordata
- Class: Actinopterygii
- Order: Tetraodontiformes
- Family: Aracanidae
- Genus: Anoplocapros
- Species: A. inermis

Binomial name
- Anoplocapros inermis (Fraser Brunner, 1935)

Synonyms
- Anoplocapros robustus (Fraser-Brunner, 1941); Strophiurichthys inermis Fraser-Brunner, 1935; Strophiurichthys robustus Fraser-Brunner, 1941

= Eastern smooth boxfish =

Species of fish

The Eastern smooth boxfish (Anoplocapros inermis), also known as the chubby basketfish, freckled boxfish, golden boxfish, polled boxfish, robust boxfish or white-barred boxfish, is a species of marine ray-finned fish belonging to the family Aracanidae, the deepwater boxfishes or temperate boxfishes. This fish is endemic to the seas of southeastern Australia.

== Taxonomy ==
The Eastern smooth boxfish was first formally described as Strophiurichthys inermis in 1935 by the British ichthyologist Alec Fraser-Brunner with its type locality given as Port Jackson in New South Wales. This species is now regarded as a member of the genus Anoplocapros which the 5th edition of Fishes of the World classifies within the family Aracanidae within the suborder Ostracioidea in the order Tetraodontiformes.

== Etymology ==
The Eastern smooth boxfish is in the genus Anoplocapros, a name which compounds anoplos, meaning "unarmed", with capros, which means a "wild boar". The unarmed part refers to the lack of spines, while the allusion to wild boars may refer to these fishes being known as seapigs in the 19th century, probably an allusion to the resemblance of these fishes on a rear view to a pig. The specific name, inermis, also means "unarmed".

== Description ==
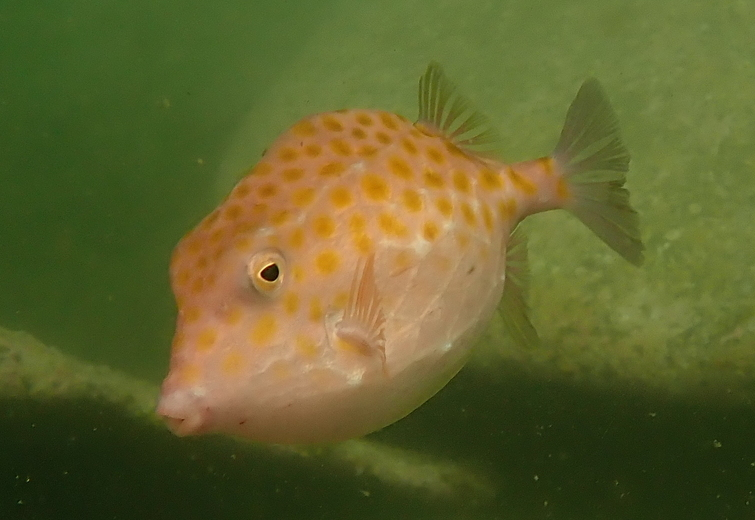
In New South Wales

The Eastern smooth boxfish has 10 or 11 soft rays in its dorsal fin, 10 or 11 in its anal fin, 12 in its pectoral fin and 11 in its caudal fin. The dorsal profile between the snout and the start of the dorsal ridge is convex. There are two series of bony plate-like scales around the caudal peduncle, the front plate is broken but the rear one is complete, both these rings have the plate-like scales are rough to the touch because they are covered in tubercles. The overall colour of the body is pale yellow to brown above the lower ridge along the flanks, this fades to white below the ridge and the dorsal and lateral sides of body with large dark yellow to dark brown spots. In larger males the overall colour changes to a uniform bluish tinged with yellow with transparent fins. This species has a maximum published total length of 35 cm (14 in).

== Distribution and habitat ==
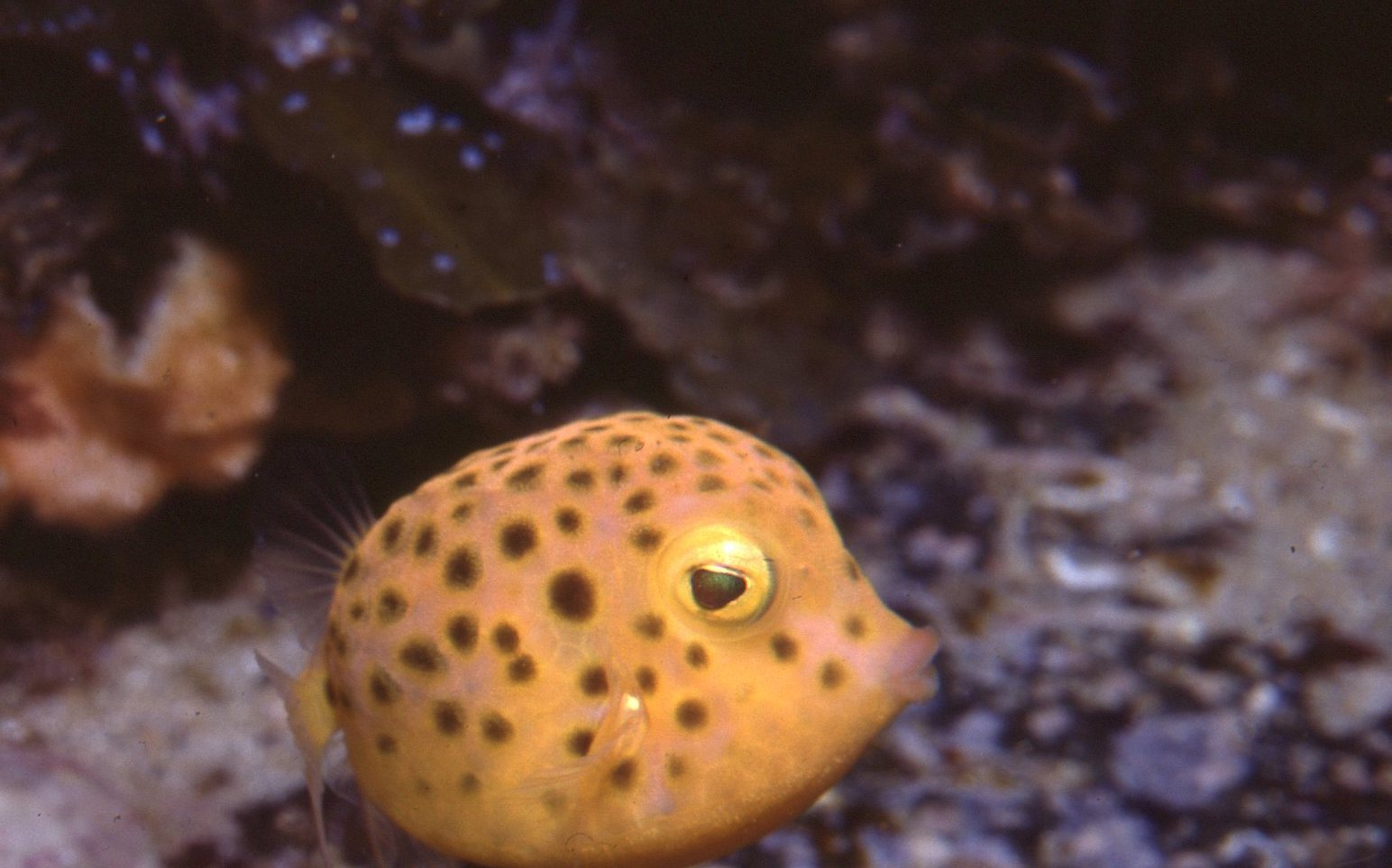
Juvenile

The Eastern smooth boxfish is endemic to southeastern Australia where it is found in southern Queensland, New South Wales and Victoria. Here it occurs at depths down to 300 m (980 ft) on coastal and offshore reefs.

== Biology ==
The Eastern smooth boxfish feeds on benthic invertebrates, e.g. crabs. There are separate sexes and the eggs and larvae are pelagic. Although this species does not have toxic flesh it can exude a toxic mucus which can kill other fish, this mucus can kill the boxfish too if it is exposed to it for too long. Where and how this mucus is produced is not known.
