= Aracana ornata =

- Male
- Female

Conservation status
- Least Concern (IUCN 3.1)

Scientific classification
- Kingdom: Animalia
- Phylum: Chordata
- Class: Actinopterygii
- Division: Teleostei
- Order: Tetraodontiformes
- Family: Aracanidae
- Genus: Aracana
- Species: A. ornata

Binomial name
- Aracana ornata (Gray, 1838)

Synonyms
- Ostracion ornata Gray, 1838; Ostracion flavigaster Gray, 1838

Species of fish

Aracana ornata, the ornate cowfish or ornate boxfish, is a species of marine ray-finned fish belonging to the family Aracanidae, the deepwater boxfishes or temperate boxfishes. This species is endemic to the seas off southern Australia.

== Taxonomy ==
Aracana ornata was first formally described as Ostracion ornata in 1838 by the English zoologist John Edward Gray with its type locality given as Circular Head, Tasmania. Gray classified it in the subgenus Aracana of the genus Ostracion, Aracana is now recognised as a valid genus and the 5th edition of Fishes of the World classifies this genus in the family Aracanidae which is in the suborder Ostracioidea within the order Tetraodontiformes.

== Etymology ==
Aracana ornata is classified in the genus Aracana, a name which was variously spelt by Gray as Acarana in 1833, Acerana in 1835 and Aracana in 1838. The 1838 name is the one used because it has become the most commonly used name. Grey did not explain the name but in 1835 he referred to boxfishes as "parrotfishes", so the name may refer the aracanga (Macrocercus aracanga), an old name for the scarlet macaw (Ara macao). The specific name ornata, means 'beautiful' or 'adorned'; Gray described this fish as a "distinct and beautiful" species.

== Distribution and habitat ==
Aracana ornata is endemic to the coastal waters of temperate Australia from Merimbula in New South Wales west to Esperance on the southern coast of Western Australia. This species is found at depths down to 15 m (49 ft) in seagrass beds in shltered bays, harbours and other sheltered coastal waters.

== Description ==
Male and female

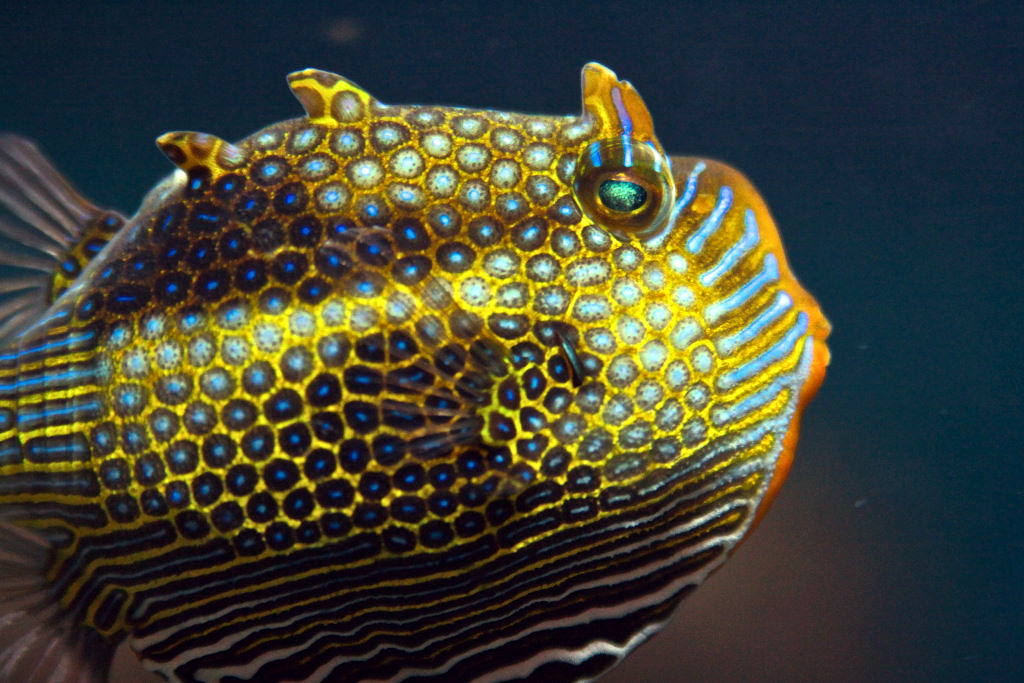
Male

Aracana ornata has a body which is armoured in a stiff carapace which is made up of large sculptured bony plates and they have bony ridges which bear large recurved spines. The dorsal and anal fins are opposite each other and are placed towards the caudal peduncle which either has no bony plates or reduced plates. The males are marked with blue and orange stripes, spots and reticulations with a yellowish-orange caudal fin has a pattern of blue lines. They also have a convex snout. Females are dark brown striped with white or yellowish-white, some of these are wavy and these can form circles on the back. The females are yellow to vivid orange on the lower body. The dorsal fin has 10 or 11 soft rays while the anal fin has 10, the pectoral fin also has 10 and the caudal fin has 11. The ornate cowfish has a maximum published total length of 15 cm (5.9 in).
