= Polyplacapros =

Conservation status
- Least Concern (IUCN 3.1)

Scientific classification
- Kingdom: Animalia
- Phylum: Chordata
- Class: Actinopterygii
- Division: Teleostei
- Order: Tetraodontiformes
- Family: Aracanidae
- Genus: Polyplacapros; E. Fujii & Uyeno, 1979
- Species: P. tyleri

Binomial name
- Polyplacapros tyleri E. Fujii & Uyeno, 1979

Monotypic genus of fish

Polyplacapros is a monospecific genus of ray-finned fish belonging to the family Aracanidae, the temperate boxfishes or deep water boxfishes. The only species in the genus is Polyplacapros tyleri, Tyler's boxfish, which is found in the southwestern Pacific Ocean.

== Taxonomy ==
Polyplacapros was first proposed as a genus in 1979 by the Japanese ichthyologists Eiichi Fujii and Teruya Uyeno when they described Polyplacapros tyleri. The type locality of P. tyleri was given as a seamount off eastern Australia at 33°04.0'S, 156°13.2'E, from a depth of 132 m (433 ft). The 5th edition of Fishes of the World classifies this taxon in the family Aracanidae, which is in the suborder Ostracioidea within the order Tetraodontiformes.

== Etymology ==
Polyplacapros combines poly, meaning "many", with placo, which means "plate", and with capros, meaning "wild boar". This refers to the carapace, made up of bony plates on the body, and the pig-like head of this fish. The specific name honours James C. Tyler, an ichthyologist who studies tetradontiform fishes, for his contribution to the knowledge of those fishes.

== Description ==
Polyplacapros is distinguished from the other temperate boxfish genera by the carapace being formed by fused plates. The carapace does not cover the caudal peduncle or the midline on the underside where there are unfused plates. It has a longer snout than the other taxa in this family, and the caudal peduncle is thicker and longer. The carapace has a lateral and pelvic ridge on each side, each ridge having a triangular-shaped spine. There is an clef running from the dorsal fin to the anal fin, and behind this the plates are looser joined, allowing flexibility in the caudal peduncle. There is another cleft extending from the origin of the dorsal fin to the spine on the ridge along the side, and another from the lower end of the gill slit to the mouth. The carapace is more able to flex along these clefts. This species has published standard lengths that vary between 16.7 and 26.6 cm (6.6 and 10.5 in).

== Distribution ==
Polyplacapros is found in the southwestern Pacific Oceans at depths between 30 and 160 m (100 and 520 ft), and has been recorded from seamounts in the Tasman Sea, the Norfolk Ridge, Lord Howe Rise and northern New Zealand.
