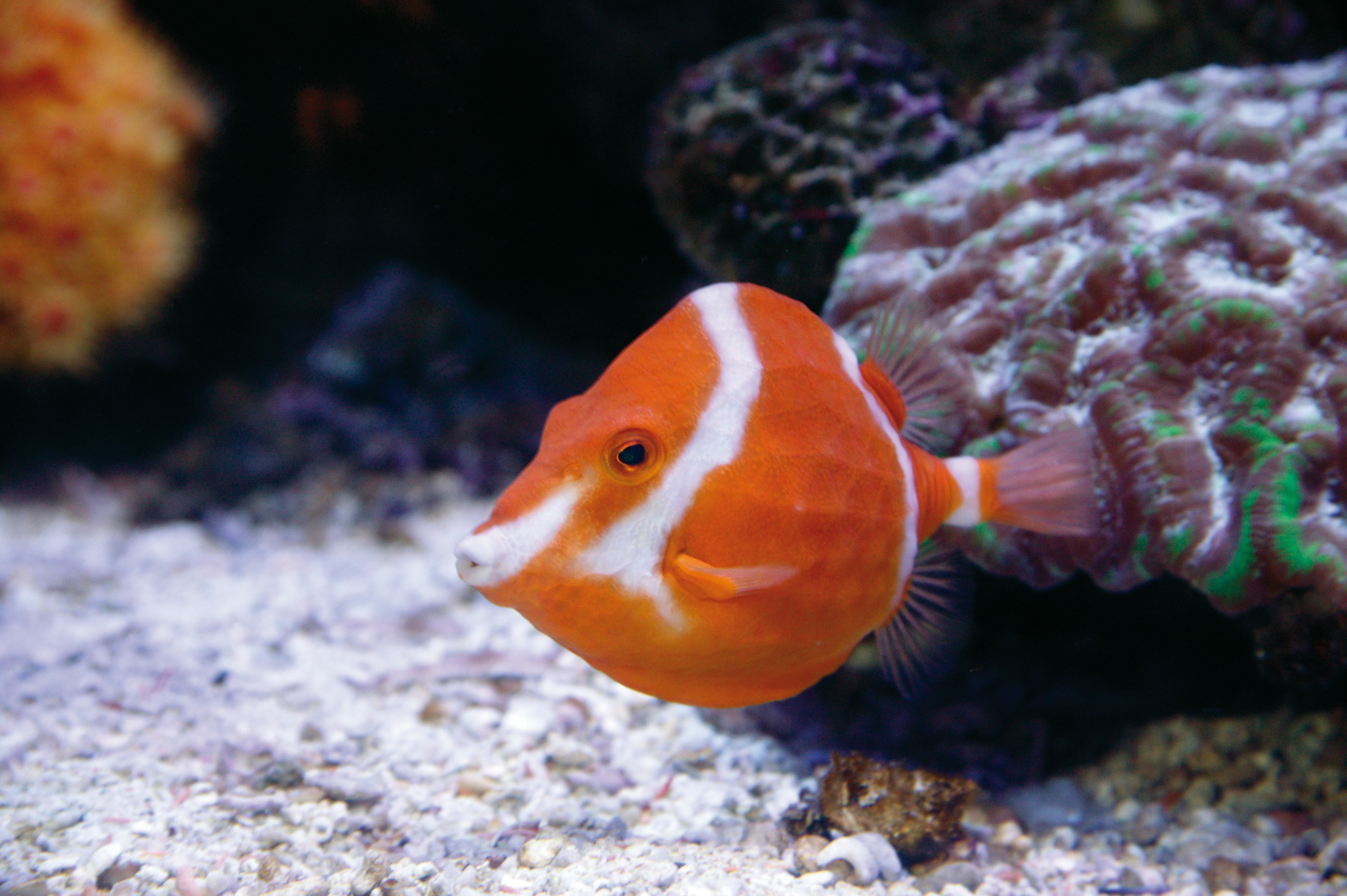
- Anoplocapros lenticularis

Scientific classification
- Kingdom: Animalia
- Phylum: Chordata
- Class: Actinopterygii
- Division: Teleostei
- Order: Tetraodontiformes
- Family: Aracanidae
- Genus: Anoplocapros; Kaup, 1855

Type species
- Ostracion lenticularis Richardson, 1841

Synonyms
- Strophiurichthys Fraser-Brunner, 1935

= Anoplocapros =

Genus of fishes

Anoplocapros is a genus of marine ray-finned fishes belonging to the family Aracanidae, the deepwater boxfishes or temperate boxfishes. These fishes are endemic to the waters around Australia.

== Taxonomy ==
Anolpocaros was first proposed as a subgenus of Aracana in 1855 by the German zoologist Johann Jakob Kaup. In 1865 Pieter Bleeker designated Ostracion lenticularis as its type species. O. lenticularis was first described in 1841 by the Scottish naval surgeon, naturalist and Arctic explorer John Richardson with its type locality given as Australia. The 5th edition of Fishes of the World classifies this genus in the family Aracanidae which is in the suborder Ostracioidea within the order Tetraodontiformes.

=== Etymology ===
Anoplocapros compound anoplos, meaning "unarmed", with capros, which means a "wild boar". The unarmed part refers to the lack of spines, while the allusion to wild boars may refer to these fishes being known as seapigs in the 19th century, probably an allusion to the resemblance of these fishes to the rear view of a pig.

== Distribution and habitat ==
Anoplocapros boxfishes are endemic to the shallow coastal waters of southern Australia. A. amygdaloides'' being found between the eastern part of the Great Australian Bight in South Australia to Shark Bay in Western Australia. A. inermis occurs between southern Queensland and Western Port in Victoria. A. lenticularis is found from Western Port to the Houtman Abrolhos off Western Australia.

== Species ==
Anoplocapros currently contains 3 recognised species:

Image	Species	Common name	Distribution
	A. amygdaloides Fraser-Brunner, 1941	Western smooth boxfish	Eastern Indian Ocean: southern Australia, from Western Australia and South Australia.
	A. inermis (Fraser-Brunner, 1935)	Eastern smooth boxfish	Southeastern Australia from southern Queensland to Western Port (Victoria).
	A. lenticularis (Richardson, 1841)	White-barred boxfish	Australia.

== Description ==
Anoplocapros boxfishes have a deep, slightly compressed, oval -shaped bodies which have an obvious ridge on the midline of the dorsal and ventral surfaces. There is also a ridge along the midline of each flank. The dorsal profile of the head is flat from the snout to the start of the dorsal ridge, although in males they become slightly convex.

The smallest species in the genus is A. amygdaloides with a maximum published total length of 30 cm (12 in) while the largest is A. inermis with a maximum published total length of 37 cm (15 in).
