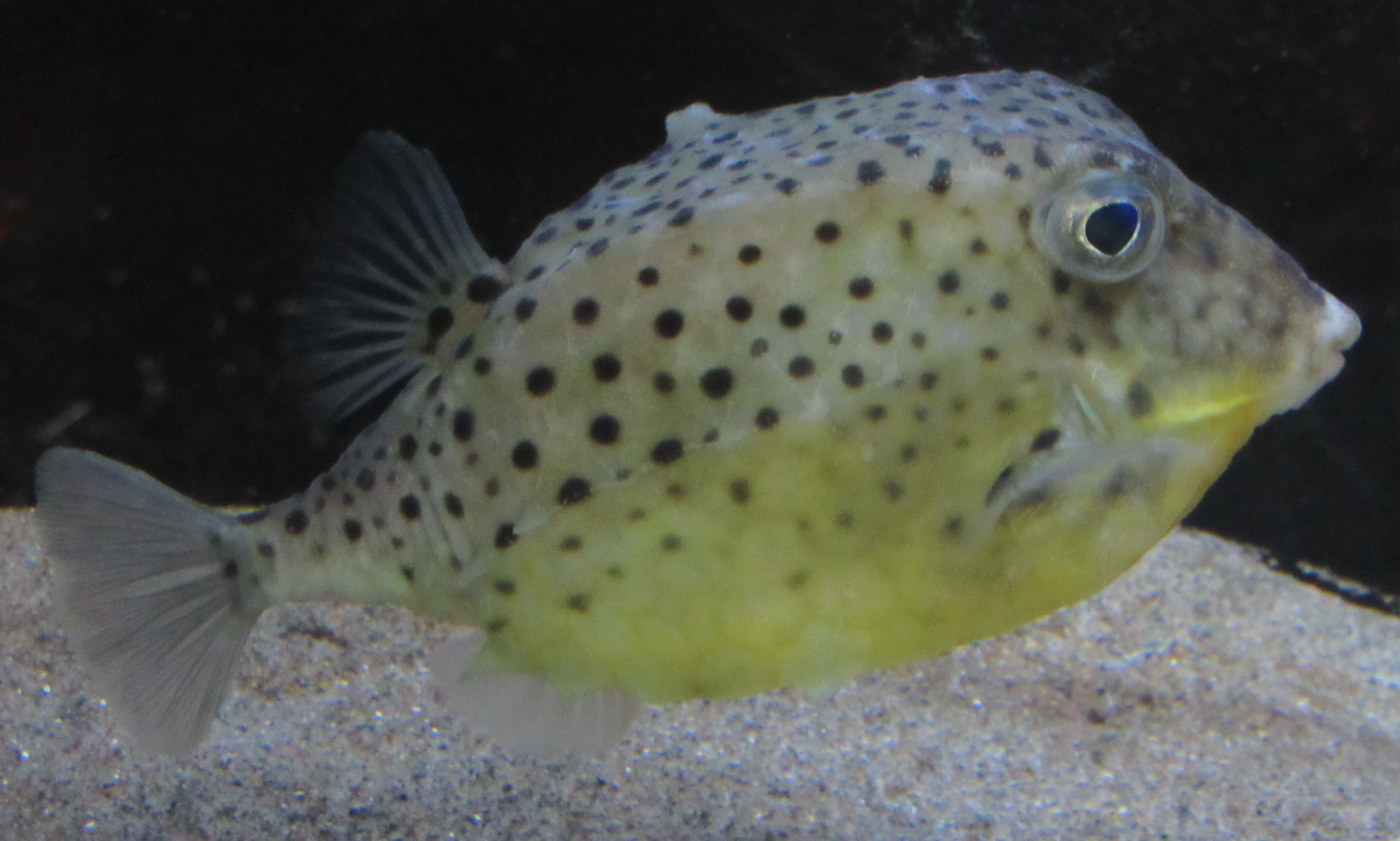

Conservation status
- Least Concern (IUCN 3.1)

Scientific classification
- Kingdom: Animalia
- Phylum: Chordata
- Class: Actinopterygii
- Order: Tetraodontiformes
- Family: Aracanidae
- Genus: Kentrocapros
- Species: K. aculeatus

Binomial name
- Kentrocapros aculeatus (Houttuyn, 1782)

Synonyms
- Ostracion cubicus aculeatus Houttuyn, 1782; Ostracion hexagonus Thunberg, 1787

= Kentrocapros aculeatus =

Species of fish

Kentrocapros aculeatus, the Itomaki basketfish, is a species of marine ray-finned fish belonging to the family Aracanidae, the temperate boxfishes or deepwater boxfishes. This species is found in the north western and central Pacific Ocean.

== Taxonomy ==
Kentrocapros aculeatus was first formally described as Ostracion cubicus aculeatus in 1782 by the Dutch naturalist Martinus Houttuyn with its type locality given as Nagasaki. In 1787 Carl Peter Thunberg described Ostracion hexagonus from Japan and in 1855 Johann Jakob Kaup proposed a new monotypic subgenus of Aracana which he called Kentrocapros with O. hexagonus as its only species. O. hexagonus is now considered to be a synonym of O. c. aculeatus, so this species is the type species of Kentrocapros by monotypy. The 5th edition of Fishes of the World classifies Kentrocapros in the family Aracanidae which is in the suborder Ostracioidea within the order Tetraodontiformes.

== Etymology ==
Kentrocapros aculeatus is the type species of the genus Kentrocapros, a name which combines kentro meaning "thorn" or "spine", a reference to the spiny ridge along the flanks of this species, with capros, meaning "wild boar". This may allude to these fishes being known as seapigs in the 19th Century, probably an allusion to the resemblance of these fishes on a rear view to a pig. The specific name, aculeatus, means "spined" or "pointed" and refers to the spiny ridge along the flanks too.

== Description ==
Kentrocapros aculeatus has a truncated and deep body with the trunk encased in a carapace of plate-like bony scales, this carapace has three ridges on either side but there is no dorsal or ventral ridge. The upper ridge on each side has flat spine at its centre and one near the rear of the middle ridge with 5 oblique spines in the middle edge of the lower ridge, as well as a flat triangular spine with another spine at its rear. There are 5 or 6 isolated plate like scales on the caudal peduncle, The short based dorsal fin is located towards the rear of the body and the anal fin is similar. The overall colour of the body is greyish-brown, with a number of brown spots, similar in diameter to the pupils, on the back and upper sides. This species has a maximum published standard length of 13 cm (5.1 in).

== Distribution and habitat ==
Kentrocapros aculeatus has a range which encompasses the Northwestern and central Pacific Oceans. It is found from Jeju Island in South Korea and Japan where it occurs as far north as Natori City and Toyama Bay, the Ogasawara Islands, Taiwan, China, the East China Sea, Johnston Atoll and the Hawaiian Islands. It is found at depths between 99 and 298 m (320 and 980 ft) on deep rocky reefs and sandy bottoms.
