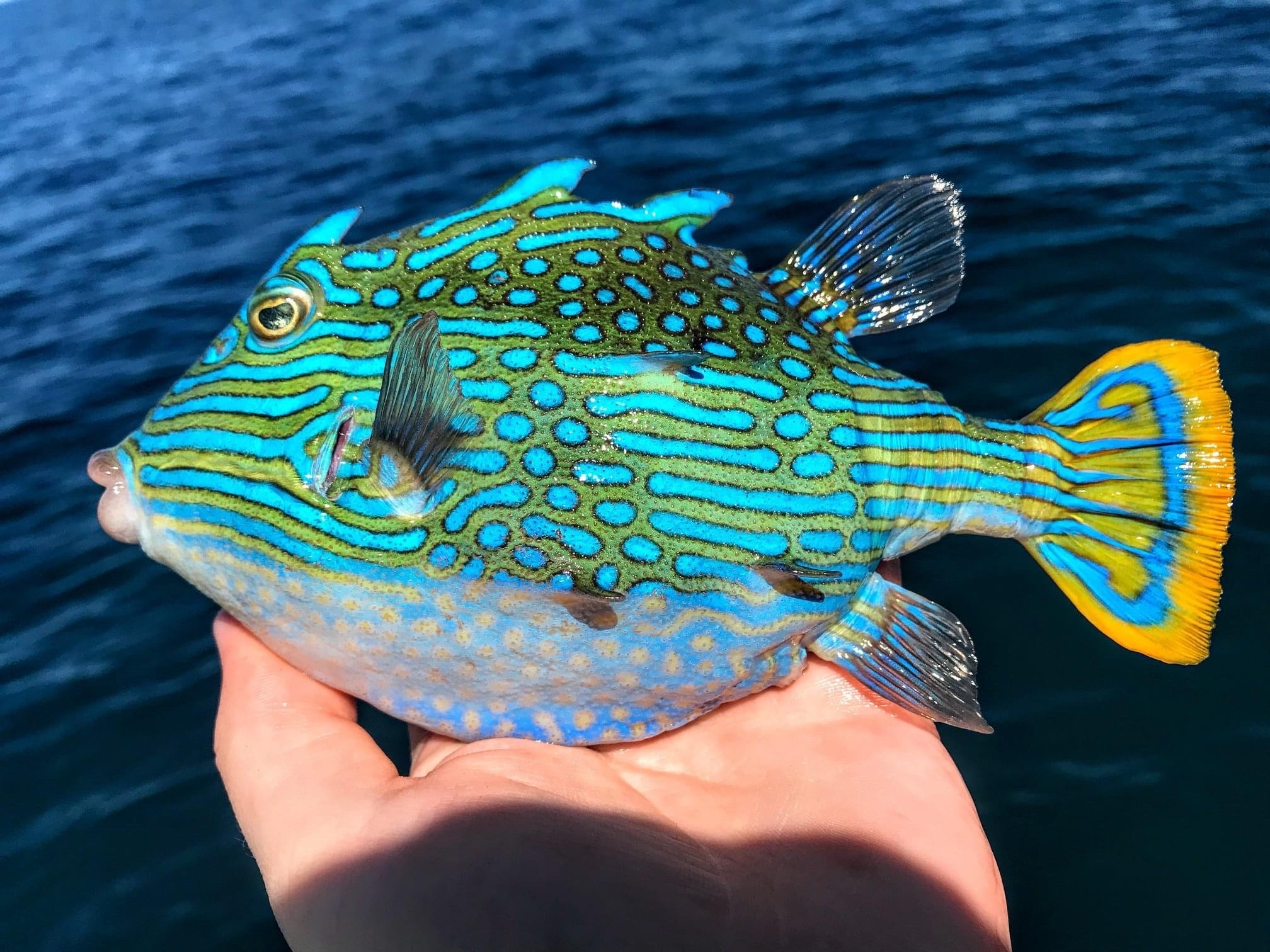
- Aracana aurita
- Aracana ornata

Scientific classification
- Kingdom: Animalia
- Phylum: Chordata
- Class: Actinopterygii
- Division: Teleostei
- Order: Tetraodontiformes
- Family: Aracanidae
- Genus: Aracana; J. E. Gray, 1838

Type species
- Ostracion auritus Shaw, 1798

= Aracana =

Genus of fishes

Aracana is a genus of marine ray-finned fishes belonging to the family Aracanidae, the deepwater boxfishes or temperate boxfishes. These fishes are endemic to the waters around Australia.

== Taxonomy ==
Aracana was first proposed as a monotypic subgenus of Ostracion in 1838 by the British zoologist John Edward Gray with O. auritus as its only species. By 1838 five species were classified in the genus and in 1866 Pieter Bleeker formally designated O. auritus as the type species of Aracana. O. auritus was first described in 1798 by George Shaw with its type locality given as the "Islands of the Pacific", probably a reference to Tasmania. The 5th edition of Fishes of the World classifies this genus in the family Aracanidae which is in the suborder Ostracioidea within the order Tetraodontiformes.

== Etymology ==
Aracana was variously spelt by Gray as Acarana in 1833, Acerana in 1835 and Aracana in 1838. The 1838 name is the one used because it has become the most commonly used name. Grey did not explain the name but in 1835 he referred to boxfishes as "parrotfishes", so the name may refer the aracanga (Macrocercus aracanga), an old name for the scarlet macaw (Ara macao).

== Species ==
There are currently 2 recognized species in this genus:

| Male | Female | Species | Common name | Distribution |
|---|---|---|---|---|
| | | Aracana aurita (G. Shaw, 1798) | Striped cowfish | southern Australia (Perth to Sydney). |
| | | Aracana ornata (J. E. Gray, 1838) | Ornate cowfish | southern Australia (Great Australian Bight to Bass Strait). |

== Characteristics ==
Aracana cowfishes have short, deep, robust bodies that are almost completely enclosed in a carapace made up of large, thickened, bony plate-like scales. They have a keel along the ventral surface and large recurved spines along the ridges on the carapace. A. aurita has a maximum published total length of 20 cm (7.9 in) while for A. ornata it is 15 cm (5.9 in).

== Distribution and habitat ==
Aracana cowfishes are endemic to the coasts of southern and western Australia from New South Wales south to Tasmania and west to Western Australia. They are found in sheltered coastal waters, on rock reefs and sea grass beds.
