= Aracanidae =

Aracanidae Temporal range: Eocene–Recent
- Aracana ornata

Scientific classification
- Kingdom: Animalia
- Phylum: Chordata
- Class: Actinopterygii
- Division: Teleostei
- Order: Tetraodontiformes
- Superfamily: Ostracioidea
- Family: Aracanidae; Hollard, 1860

Genera
- see text

Family of fishes

Aracanidae, the deepwater boxfishes or temperate boxfishes, are a family of marine ray-finned fishes belonging to the order Tetraodontiformes, which also includes the pufferfishes, triggerfishes and ocean sunfishes. The fishes in this family are found in the Indo-West Pacific region, particularly in the waters around Australia.

== Taxonomy ==
Aracanidae was first proposed as a family in 1860 by the Swiss-born French biologist Henri Louis Gabriel Marc Hollard. In the past this taxon was regarded as a subfamily of the Ostraciidae. However, recent phylogenetic studies have concluded that the families Aracanidae and Ostraciidae are valid families but that they are part of the same clade, the suborder Ostracioidei. The 5th edition of Fishes of the World classifies this clade as the suborder Ostracioidea within the order Tetraodontiformes.

== Genera ==
Aracanidae contains the following six extant and single extinct genera:

- Anoplocapros Kaup, 1855
- Aracana Gray, 1833
- Caprichthys McCulloch & Waite, 1915
- Capropygia Kaup, 1855
- Kentrocapros Kaup 1855
- Polyplacapros Fujii & Uyeno 1979
- †Proaracana Le Danois, 1961

† means extinct.

== Etymology ==
Aracanidae takes its name from its type genus Aracana which was named by the English zoologist John Edward Grey who variously spelt the name Acarana in 1833, Acerana in 1835 and Aracana in 1838. The 1838 name is the one used because it has become the most commonly used name. Grey did not explain the name but in 1835 he referred to boxfishes as "parrotfishes", so the name may refer the aracanga (Macrocercus aracanga), an old name for the scarlet macaw (Ara macao).

== Characteristics ==
Aracanidae boxfishes are oval to round in shape and which is almost completely covered in bony armour created by thickened plate-like scales. These scale are typically hexagonal and are firmly attached to each other, the caudal peduncle is mostly naked but has a few isolated plate-like scales. This armoured carapace has a series of longitudinal ridges, including a ventral ridge, and in some species these have spines on them. They have rather small mouths and often forage for invertebrate by squirting water into the sediment. These fishes do not possess fin spines and pelvic fins, and the dorsal and anal fins have short bases and are set well towards the back of the body. The temperate boxfishes vary in size from a maximum published standard length of 10.4 cm (4.1 in) in the case of Kentrocapros spilonota up to a maximum published total length 37 cm (15 in) in the case of the Eastern smooth boxfish (Anoplocapros inermis).

== Distribution ==
Aracanidae boxfishes are found in the Indian and Western Pacific Oceans with most species being found around Australia but a few species extend west to eastern Africa and north to Japan.

== Fossil record ==
Aracanidae has a fossil record consisting of a single species, Proaracana dubia, from the Eocene of Monte Bolca in Italy.
