= Walters Shoals =

Group of submerged mountains off the coast of Madagascar

Natal Seamount
- Location within Indian Ocean
- Summit depth: 18 m (59 ft)
- Height: 4,750 m (15,580 ft)

Location
- Range: Walters Shoals
- Coordinates: 33°12′S 43°50′E

The Walters Shoals is a group of submerged mountains off the coast of Madagascar. The shoals are 845 kilometres (525 mi) south of Cape Sainte Marie - Madagascar and 1,210 kilometres (750 mi) east of Richards Bay at the African coast. The tips of some of the mountains are only 18 metres (59 ft) below the surface. The Walters Shoals is home to many species of fish, crustaceans, and mollusks and is considered as a Ecologically or Biologically Significant Area. Groups of Barau's petrel (Pterodroma baraui) forage the area during their breeding season. It was discovered in 1963 by the South African Hydrographic Frigate SAS Natal captained by Cmdr Walters. When found it had a huge population of Galápagos sharks but they have since been fished out.
