= Sorbinicapros =

Sorbinicapros Temporal range: Late Ypresian, 48.96–48.5 Ma

Scientific classification
- Kingdom: Animalia
- Phylum: Chordata
- Class: Actinopterygii
- Division: Teleostei
- Order: Acanthuriformes
- Family: †Sorbinipercidae
- Genus: †Sorbinicapros; Bannikov & Tyler, 1999

Type species
- Sorbinicapros sorbiniorum Bannikov & Tyler, 1999

Extinct genus of fishes

Sorbinicapros is an extinct genus of acanthuriform ray-finned fish placed in the family Sorbinipercidae. Material of the fish is only known from the Pesciara site of Monte Bolca in Italy. It was a small, deep-bodied fish with a protractile jaw with largely molariform teeth. The exact placement of Sorbinicapros and its sister genus Sorbiniperca haven't been studied in recent years. In the past, these fish have been placed in a clade containing Caproidae, Zeiformes, and Tetraodontiformes but it is understood to not be a true clade in more recent years. The most recent placement showed it closely related to some Tetraodontiformes such as Parahollardia and Cretatriacanthus. There is one species within the genus: Sorbinicapros sorbiniorum.

== History and naming ==
The material assigned to Sorbinicapros was collected from the Pesciara site of Monte Bolca in Italy. There is a gap between the collection of both specimens, with the more recent of the two being collected in 1988. These specimens were later described by Alexandre F. Bannikov and James C. Taylor in 1999.

The generic name of Sorbinicapros is in honor of Lorenzo Sorbini, a well known paleoichthyologist and previous director of the Museo Civico di Storia Naturale di Verona, along with the genus Capros. Similarly, the specific name "sorbiniorum" is in reference to both Lorenzo Sorbini and Chiara Sorbini.

== Description ==
Sorbinicapros is a small, deep-bodied fish with a short but robust caudal peduncle known from two complete specimens. The holotype specimen (MCSNV VR. 27634/27635) has a standard length of 88 millimetres (3.5 in) while the paratype (MCSNV VIII.C9/10) is slightly larger, having a standard length of 94 millimetres (3.7 in). Both specimens are represented by both a part and counterpart. Compared to the relatively stout body of the fish, the caudal fin of Sorbinicapros is very large, measuring 46 millimetres (1.8 in) in the paratype. The deepest portion of the body is located at the level of the first dorsal, being 66-71% of the standard length.

=== Skull ===
As seen with other fish with body lengths that are shorter proportionally, the head of Sorbinicapros makes up a decent amount of its body length. This equals about 38.6% and 36.2% of the standard lengths of the holotype and paratype respectively. Also similar to other deep-bodied fish, the skull of the fish is deep and triangular in shape. The orbits of the fish is small and placed fairly high on the skull. Similar to other portions of the skull, the deep neurocranium of Sorbinicapros is not completely preserved. The parasphenoid is a straight bone located above the orbit and possesses a large flange on the ventral portion. The ethmoid region of the neurocranium is long and ossified. Though preserved in specimens, the exact anatomy of the supraoccipital is poorly known.

The jaws of Sorbinicapros are made up of robust bones that take up is large amount of the head (about 64.7%) and is slightly pointed downwards. The premaxilla is a large, L-shaped bone with a long ascending process. Though not preserved, the maxilla was most likely closely articulated with the previously mentioned bone. The mandible deep and triangular, resulting in the symphysis being much more shallow than the posterior portion. Sorbinicapros has a heterodont dentition. This is best preserved on the premaxilla which possesses multiple series of teeth with fifteen teeth making up the main series. The anterior-most teeth are cone-shaped and much larger than the others. The other teeth on the premaxilla along with those seen on the mandible, are much shorter and molariform. The large ascending process on the premaxilla also suggests that Sorbinicapros had a protractile jaw. The suspensorium of the fish is poorly preserved with the only two bones being visible being the triangular quadrate and hyomandibular. Very small portions of the ectopterygoid and metapterygoid can be seen in the holotype and paratype respectively. The point of jaw articulation is located under the front edge of the orbit. The branchial arches of Sorbinicapros are not well preserved, though some features are able to be made out. These bones are saber-shaped and there most likely would have only been a maximum of five. The hyoid is also poorly preserved so no features of the anatomy can be made out. The opercular region of the fish is very narrow and deep. It is preserved in specimens though it is hard to make out the exact bones. Based on the known material, the region has no serrations on the posterior edge. The preopercle seems to be a narrow, slightly anteriorly-curving bone.

=== Postcranium ===
Similar to much of the skull, the pectoral girdle of Sorbinicapros is incompletely preserved. The cleithrum is a long, robust bone that curves anteriorly at the upper third of its length. Its posterodorsal flange is narrow like the rest of the bone. The ventral postcleithrum is also a long, narrow bone that is pointed posteroventrally. This bone tapers off, ending at the first anal-fin pterygiophore. There is also a smaller rounded bone located behind the cleithrum in the paratype which has been interpreted to represent the dorsal postcleithrum. Like the other bones of the girdle, the coracoid is narrow though thinner that the other bones. It has a well developed postcoracoid process and is suggested to be thicker towards the back. The pectoral fins of the fish are interpreted to be small and rounded, being located just under the midpoint of the body. Based on the poorly preserved fin on the holotype, it is made up of at least twelve fin rays.

The pelvic bone is broad and smaller than the bones that make up the pectoral girdle. It is angled posteroventrally from where it attaches to the cleithra. Due to the pelvic girdle being connecting to the pectoral girdle, the pelvic fin is located just behind the pectoral fin. The fin is made up of a total of a thick fin spine and four unbranched rays. It is a fairly large fin, with it extending to the anal fin when closed. The dorsal fin pterygiophores begin in line with the first neural spine. The first of these bones is the largest and is in near contact with occiput. Similarly, the other pterygiophores also insert between neural spines further down in the column. The exception to this are the interneural spaces between the first and second, fourth and fifth, and sixth and seventh. While the first three of these bones are angled slightly anteroventrally, the others are vertical. The dorsal fin itself is split into two sections with indentation between the two, though it is still one continuous fin. The first of these is the spiny portion which is made up of seven thicker, spine-like rays. These quickly increase then decrease in length, with the second and third being the longest spines and the seventh being the shortest. The soft portion of the dorsal fin is made up of either fifteen or sixteen shorter rays. The middle rays are the longest, resulting in a semicircular shape. Based on the remains, it is very likely that these were unbranched rays.

The anal fin of Sorbinicapros begins about two thirds down the length of the body. Like the dorsal fin, the anal fin is split into a spiny and soft section. Compared to in the dorsal fin, the first anal pterygiophore is a massive bone that is parallel with the entirely of the nearby haemal spines. This large bone possesses a large, triangular ventral projection. Those seen on the soft section of the fin are much more similar to what is seen on the dorsal fin though slightly longer. The spiny part of the anal fin is made up of three spines with thickened bases. The first is the largest, the others being progressively smaller. The first and second spines are both inserted into the first pterygiophore. This results in a wide space between the second and third spines. There is also a wide space between the third spine and the soft section of the dorsal fin. This section is made up of thirteen to fourteen rays and is very similar morphologically to the soft section of the dorsal fin. The soft sections of the two unpaired fins are also parallel to one another.

The vertebral column of Sorbinicapros is made up of a total of twenty two vertebrae with this being split between eight abdominal and fourteen caudal vertebrae. Two supraneurals are additionally located between the skull and the dorsal fin. The axis is slightly elevated towards the front, resulting in a vague "s" shape. Each centrum is almost square with the first two centra being slightly more foreshortened than the others. The neural spines of the abdominal and caudal portion of the column differ from one another. In some cases, the associated haemal spines in the anterior portion of the column are longer than their corresponding neural arch. Those on the abdominal vertebrae are short and point backwards. Due to them being fairly wide, each of the spines make contact with the others on each side of their zygapophyseal region. The neural spines of the caudal region are much thinner and are paired with thinner haemal spines. Pleural ribs are connected to their corresponding vertebrae and begin on the third vertebrae. It is the shortest rib though ribs are short in general, only taking up the upper third of the abdominal cavity. The paratype includes what could be the epipleurals. The caudal skeleton of the fish is poorly preserved but a deep diastema can be seen between the hypaxial and epaxial hypurals. Based on what can be seen, the hypurals would have most likely been unfused and separate from the vertebral column. Two epurals are preserved on the paratype though it is possible that a third would have been present. The caudal fin itself is very long and made up of two lobes that were separated by a wide gap. The top lobe is made up of eleven rays, being made up of seven principal and four procurrent rays. Though not as well preserved, the lower lobe most likely is made up of the same amount of principal rays and at least three procurrent rays.

=== Squamation ===
The scales of Sorbinicapros were small and rounded, being on both the postcranium and cheeks of the fish. Each of the scales possess a ridge with star-shaped radiations from the structure. The exact size of the scales differed throughout the body, measuring 0.4–0.8 millimetres (0.016–0.031 in) in diameter. They are largely non-overlapping but were much more dense on the top and bottom edges of the body.

== Classification ==
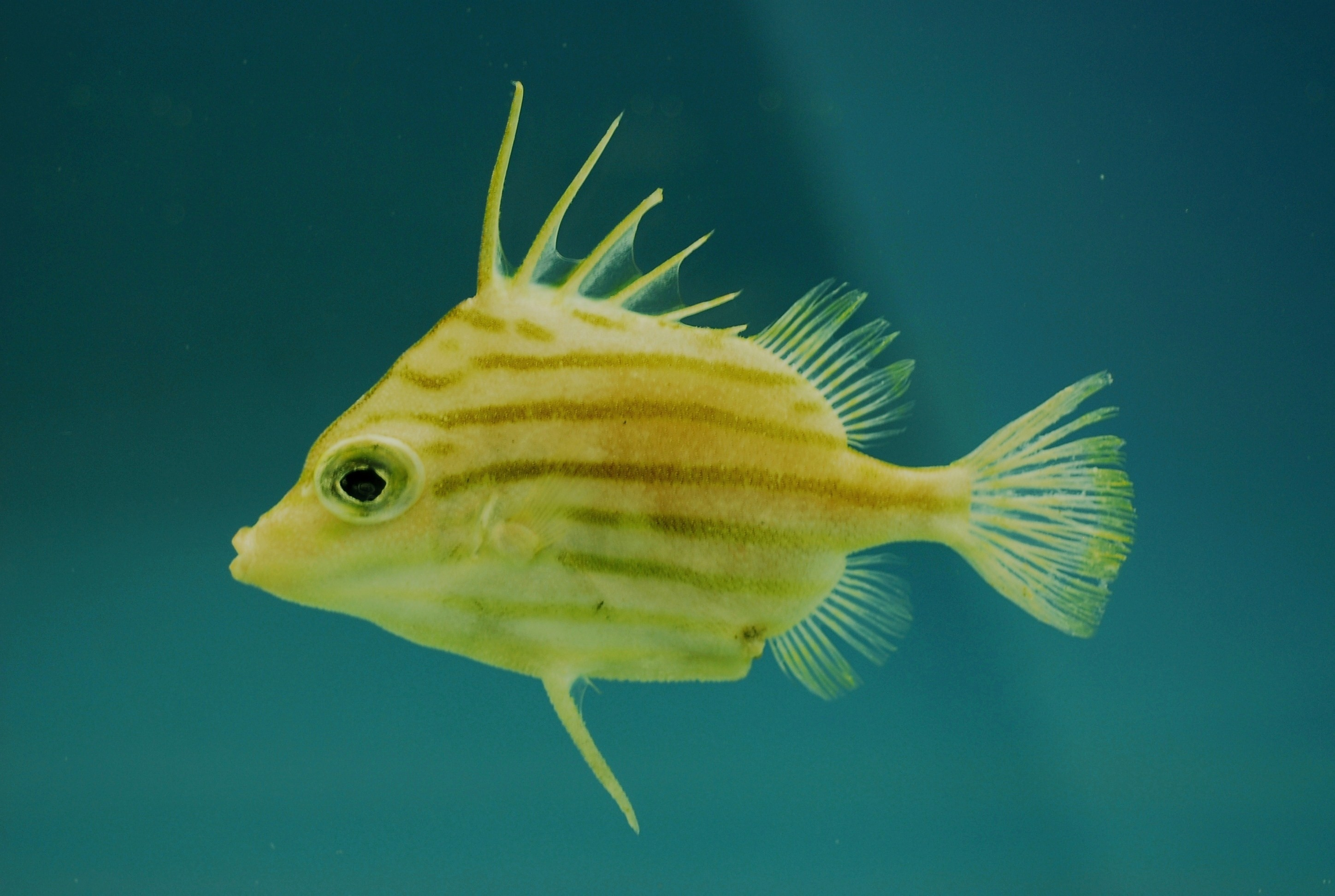
Parahollardia, a fish suggested to be a close extant relative of Sorbinicapros

In the original 1999 publication describing Sorbinicapros, it was placed within Sorbinipercidae which previously only contained Sorbiniperca. Though very different morphologically, both fish have a number of derived features that result in a formation of a clade. This includes features such as a reduction in the abdominal vertebrae, the unpaired fins being split into two lobes, the presence of crushing teeth, and three vacant interneural spaces. Sorbiniperca is largely more derived than Sorbinicapros but the latter does see a slight reduction in its branchiostegal ray count. At the time of the paper's publication a clade made up of Caproidae, Zeiformes, and Tetraodontiformes was thought to exist. This was largely because of shared features in the fins and neural spines. These features are also similar to what is seen in Sorbinipercidae, resulting in the famaily being noted as the sister group to the previously mentioned clade. A 2005 publication by Tyler and Franceso Santini expanded on this, finding a clade between Sorbinipercidae and Zorzinichthys. This clade formed by the three genera was also found to be the sister group to a clade made up of members of Tetraodontiformes: Parahollardia, Pseudotriacanthus, Plectocretacicus, and Cretatriacanthus. In more recent years, the clade formed by Caproidae, Zeiformes, and Tetraodontiformes has been no longer accepted. Caproidae, along with the extinct genus Caprosimilis, is currently interpreted to be the outgroup to a clade made up of lophiods and tetraodontoids within Percomorpha. Zeiformes on the other hand is currently the sister group to Gadiformes; a group containing fish such as cods, codlets, and tube-eyes. This results in the original clade formed by these three groups to be due to convergence rather than forming a true clade. Since this change in understanding, the systematic placement of Sorbinipercidae has not been tested. The phylogenic tree from Tyler and Santini (2005) can be found below:

- - - Melamphaes suborbitalis
    - Anoplogaster cornuta
    - - - Plectrypops lima
        - Sargocentron punctatissimum
      - - Hoplostethus mediterraneus
        - - Centroberyx affinis
          - - Morone americana
            - - - Siganus luridus
                - Naso unicornis
              - - Acanthonemus subaureus
                - - - Capros aper
                    - - Antigonia capros
                      - †Antigonia veronensis
                  - - - - †Zorzinichthys annae
                        - - †Sorbiniperca scheuchzeri
                          - †Sorbinicapros sorbiniorum
                      - - - Parahollardia lineata
                          - Pseudotriacanthus strigilifer
                        - - - †Plectocretacicus clarae
                            - †Cretatriacanthus guidottii
                    - - Zeiformes

== Paleoenvironment ==
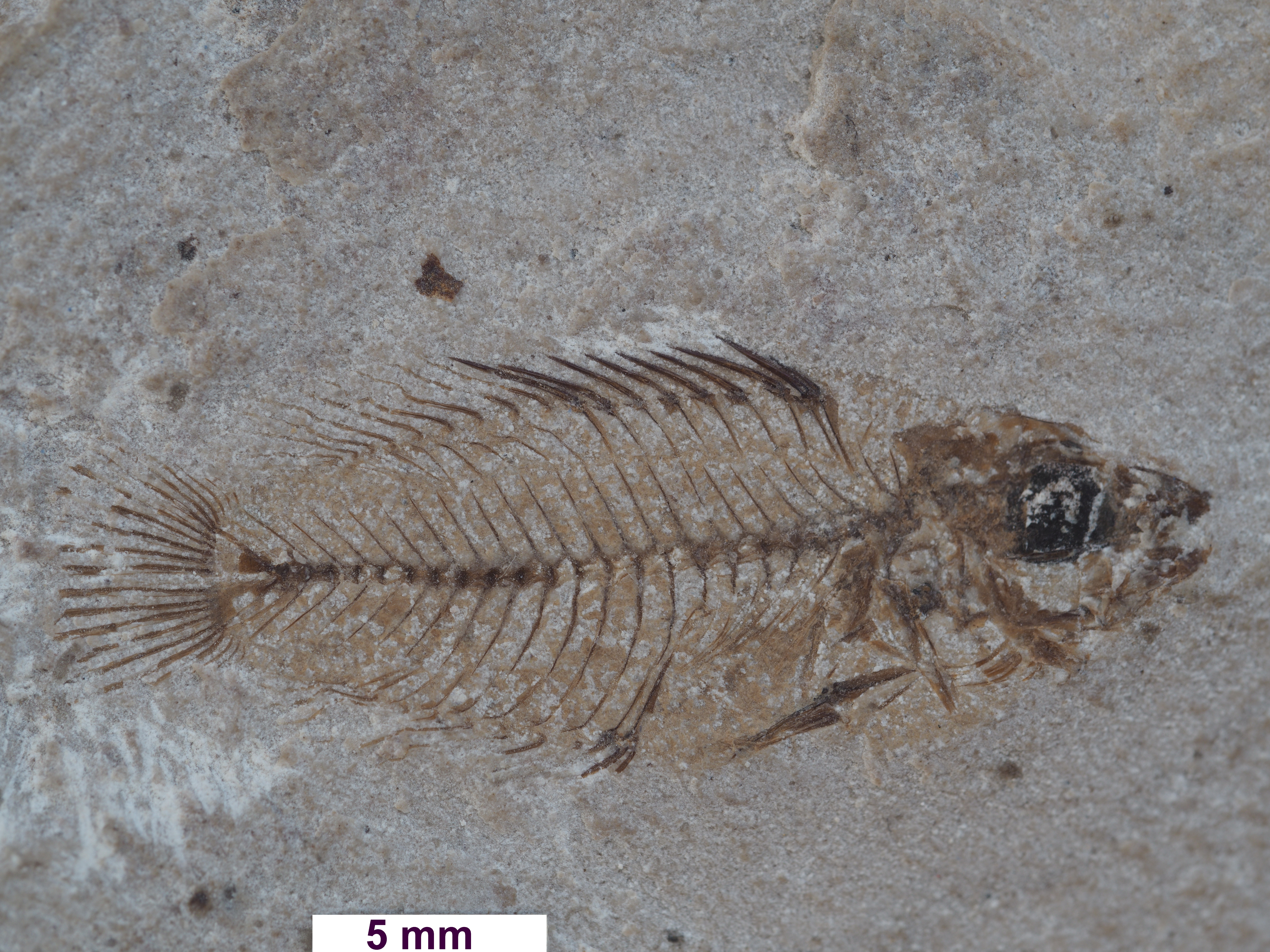
Labrobolcus giorgioi, one of the many fish from Pesciara

The environment represented by the Pesciara site is that of a intraplatform basin lacking any evidence of coral reefs, contrasting Monte Postale. Instead, the area was more likely a peri-reefal system covered in seagrass meadows and had a fish assemblage dominated by zooplanktivorous species. This more open area also allowed for more open-sea influences. The water depth of the area has been estimated to be about 40–50 metres (130–160 ft). As seen with other post Cretaceous–Paleogene extinction marine communities, the ichthyofauna of Pesciara was dominated by acanthomorph fishes with past estimates suggesting the ratio of 7 to 1. As of 2014, perciforms made up about 120 of the almost 200 acanthomorph genera at the time. Though they aren't taxonomically diverse, Clupeiformes such as Bolcaichthys are very common in the assemblage. Though no where near as common or diverse, chondrichthyans are also found at Pesciara. This diversity is represented by galeomorph sharks, stingrays, a guitarfish, and a panray. The ratio seen between the bony fish and chondrichthyan diversity is similar to what is seen in some marine environments today such as the Great Barrier Reef and within the Arabian Sea. The only tetrapods from the site are bird feathers along with the snakes Anomalophis and Archaeophis.
