= Plectocretacicoidei =

Scientific classification
- Kingdom: Animalia
- Phylum: Chordata
- Class: Actinopterygii
- Order: Tetraodontiformes
- Suborder: †Plectocretacicoidei; Tyler & Sorbini, 1996

Families
- See text

Extinct suborder of fishes

Plectocretacicoidei is an extinct suborder of Actinopterygii belonging to the order Tetraodontiformes, which includes the triggerfishes, filefishes, pufferfishes and related groups.

The fishes in this suborder were extant from the Late Cretaceous (Santonian to Campanian) of Italy and Slovenia, both in the former Tethyan region, and are regarded as basal Tetraodontiformes.

The classification of the Plectocretacicoidei as a sister group to the Tetraodontiformes has been challenged and many of the characteristics which were used to suggest a close relationship to the Tetraodontiformes are shared with the Lophiiformes, the anglerfishes, and the Lophiiformes and Tetraodontiformes share derived characteristics which are not present in the Plectocretacicoidei. The authors of this study suggest that the taxa included within Plectocretacicoidei are basal members of the Percomorpha.

== Families ==
Plectocretacicoidei includes the following families:'

- †Cretatriacanthidae Tyler & Sorbini, 1996
- †Plectocretacicidae Tyler & Sorbini, 1996
- †Protriacanthidae Tyler & Sorbini, 1996
