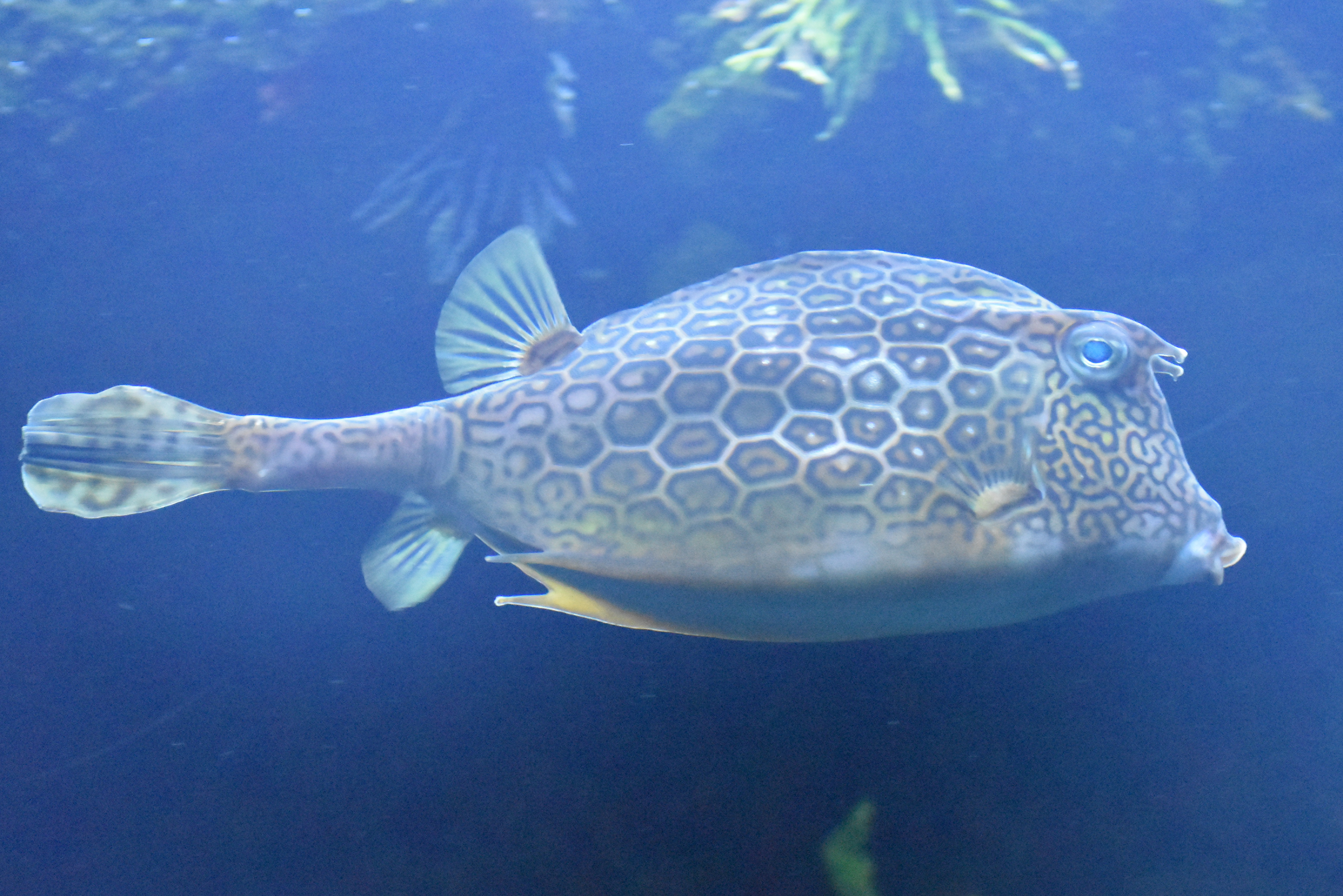
- Acanthostracion polygonius
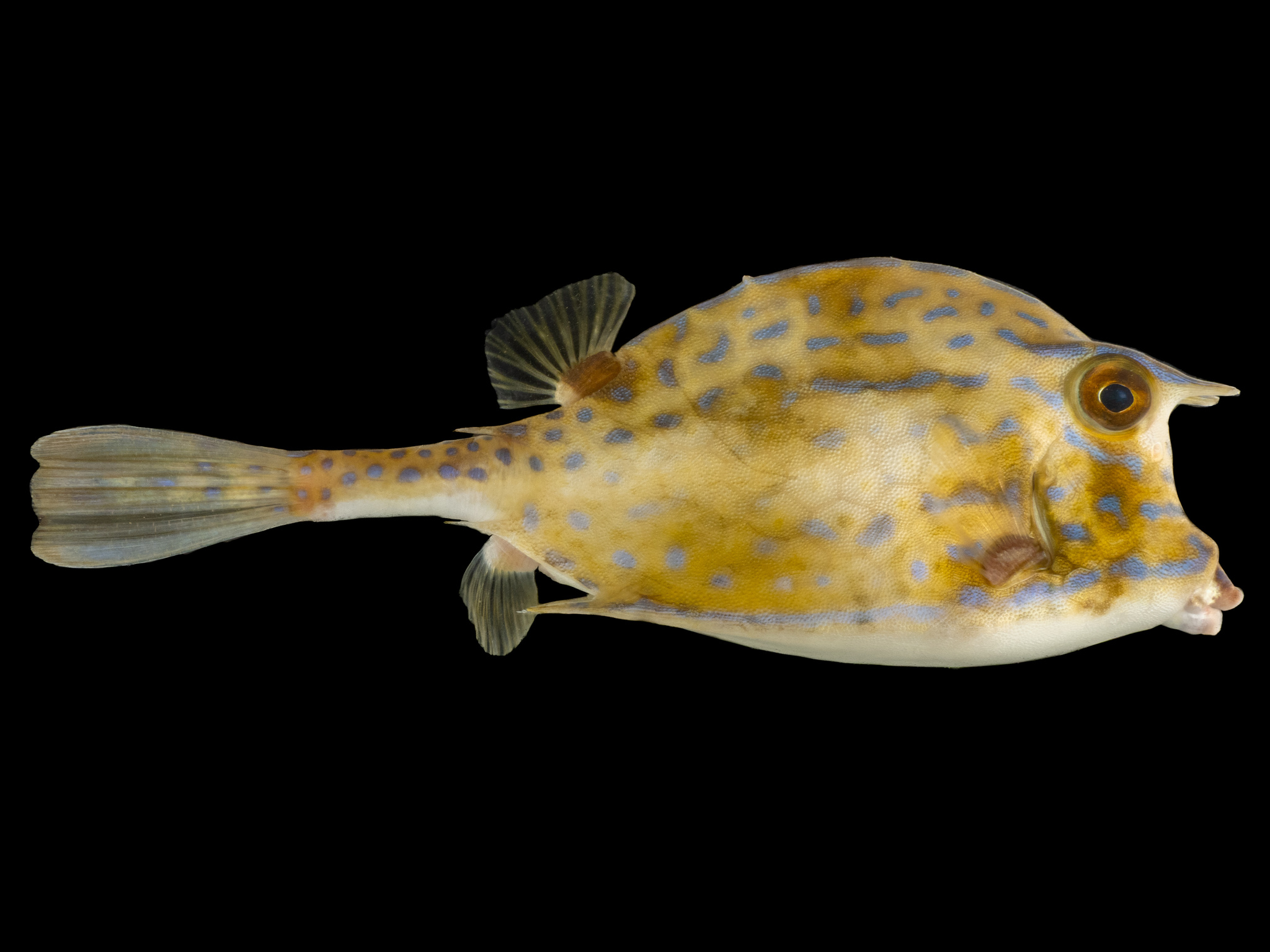
- Acanthostracion quadricornis

Scientific classification
- Kingdom: Animalia
- Phylum: Chordata
- Class: Actinopterygii
- Division: Teleostei
- Order: Tetraodontiformes
- Superfamily: Ostracioidea
- Family: Ostraciidae
- Genus: Acanthostracion; Bleeker, 1865

Type species
- Ostracion quadricornis Linnaeus, 1758

= Acanthostracion =

Genus of fishes

Acanthostracion is a genus of marine ray-finned fishes belonging to the family Ostraciidae, the boxfishes. These fishes are found in the Atlantic Ocean.

== Taxonomy ==
Acanthostracion was first proposed as a subgenus of Ostracion in 1865 by the Dutch physician, herpetologist and ichthyologist Pieter Bleeker. Bleeker did not designate a type species when he first used the name in his paper Notice sur les ostracions, confondus sous le nom d'Ostracion quadricornis L. et description des Ostracion notacanthus et guineensis but designated Ostracion quadricornis as the type species later in 1865 when he published his Atlas ichthyologique des Indes Orientalis Neerlandais. The 5th edition of Fishes of the World classifies this genus within the family Ostraciidae in the suborder Ostracioidea within the order Tetraodontiformes.

== Etymology ==
Acanthostracion comes ἄκανθα (ákantha), meaning "spine, thorn", and Ostracion, as Bleeker originally proposed this taxon as a subgenus of the latter genus.

== Species ==
There are currently 4 recognized species in this genus:

- Acanthostracion guineense (Bleeker, 1865) (West African cowfish)
- Acanthostracion notacanthus (Bleeker, 1863) (Island cowfish)
- Acanthostracion polygonius Poey, 1876 (Honeycomb cowfish)
- Acanthostracion quadricornis (Linnaeus, 1758) (Scrawled cowfish)

== Characteristics ==
Acanthosracion cowfishes have an oblong, broad body which is encased within a bony carapace made up of thickened, typically hexagonal plate-like scales which are sutured together. This carapce does not enclose the mouth, eyes, gill slits, fins and the caudal peduncle and caudal fin although it does encircle the bases of the dorsal and anal fins. There are large spine which preject in front of the eyes. There are also spines at the lower rear angle of the carapace and the rearmost plate-like scales on the upper and lower caudal peduncle are expanded into small spines. The small mouth sits at the friont of the snout and it has fleshy lips and around 15 moderately sized conical teeth in each jaw. These cowfishes have maximum published total lengths from 18 cm (7.1 in) in the West African cowfish to 55 cm (22 in) in the scrawled cowfish.

== Distribution ==
Acanthosracion cowfishes are restricted to the Atlantic Ocean with two Western Atlantic species distributed from New Jersey to Brazil in the Western Atlanticand two species in the eastern Atlantic off West Africa, as well as the Azores, Saint Helena, and Ascension Island.
