= Acanthostracion guineense =

Conservation status
- Data Deficient (IUCN 3.1)

Scientific classification
- Kingdom: Animalia
- Phylum: Chordata
- Class: Actinopterygii
- Order: Tetraodontiformes
- Family: Ostraciidae
- Genus: Acanthostracion
- Species: A. guineense

Binomial name
- Acanthostracion guineense (Bleeker, 1865

Synonyms
- Lactophrys guineensis (Bleeker, 1865); Ostracion guineense Bleeker, 1865

Species of fish

Acanthostracion guineense, the West African cowfish, is a species of marine ray-finned fish belonging to the family Ostraciidae, the boxfishes. This species is found off the coast of Western Africa in the eastern Atlantic Ocean. This species is the smallest member of the genus Acanthostracion.

== Taxonomy ==
Acanthostracion guineense was first formally described as Ostracion guineense in 1865 by the Dutch physician, herpetologist and ichthyologist Pieter Bleeker, with its type locality giben as "Guinea". The 5th edition of Fishes of the World classifies the genus Acanthostracion in the within the family Ostraciidae in the suborder Ostracioidea within the order Tetraodontiformes.

== Etymology ==
Acanthostracion guineense is classified within the genus Acanthostracion, this name combines acanthus, which means "spine" or "thorn", with ostracion. Bleeker originally proposed this taxon as a subgenus of the genus Ostracion The Specific name means "of Guinea", it is sometimes written as giuneensis but the genus name is neuter so guineense is correct.

== Description ==
Acanthostracion guineense has a maximum published total length of 18 cm (7.1 in).

== Distribution and habitat ==
Acanthostracion guineense is found in the Eastern Atlantic Ocean along the coast of Western Africa between Mauritania and Angola. It occurs at depths between 0 and 200 m (0 and 656 ft) on the continental shelf.

== Conservation status ==
Acanthostracion guineense is classified as data deficient by the IUCN, it is common in some parts of its range but there is very little data on population, life history or ecology.
