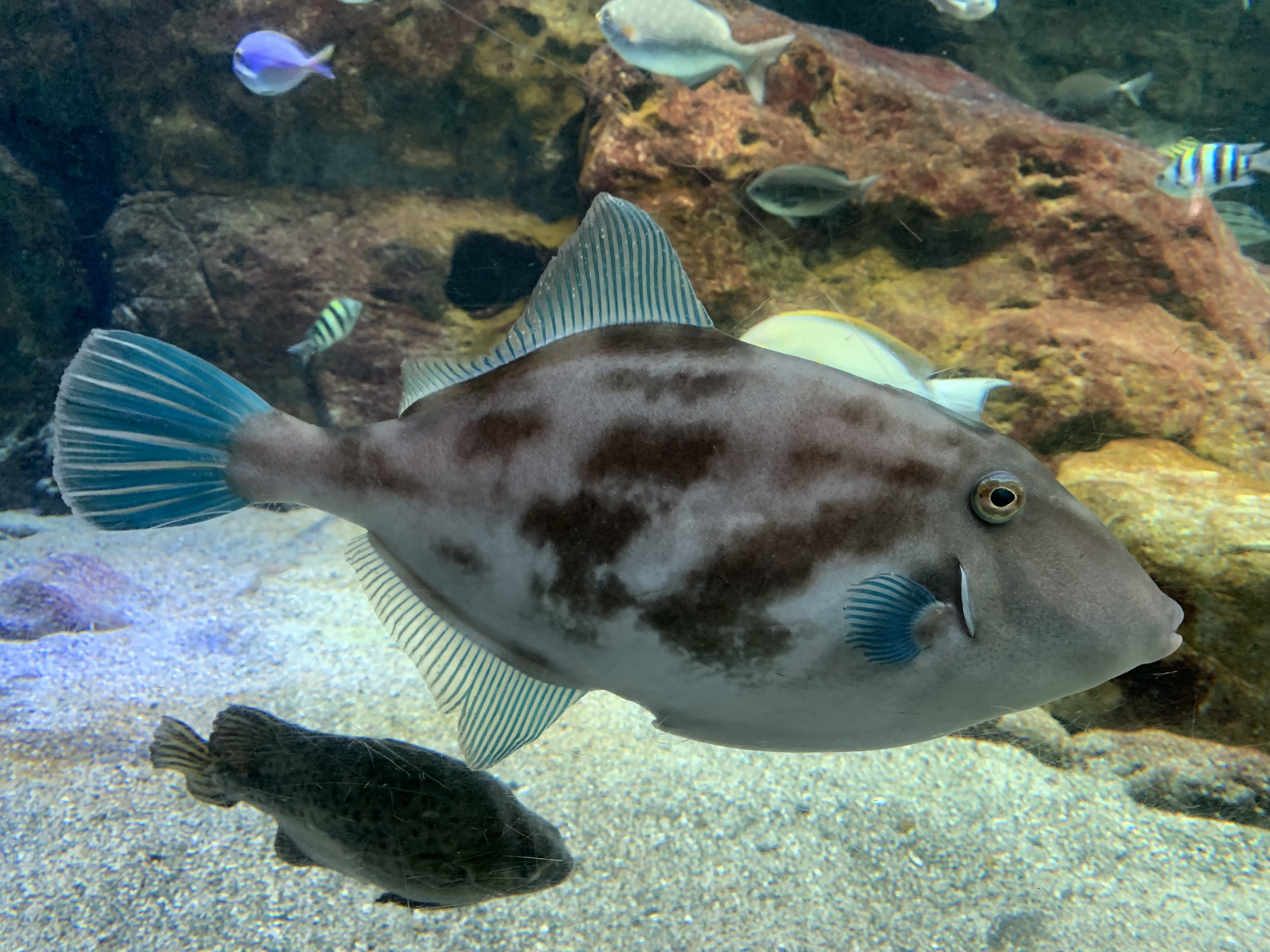
- Thamnaconus modestus

Scientific classification
- Kingdom: Animalia
- Phylum: Chordata
- Class: Actinopterygii
- Order: Tetraodontiformes
- Family: Monacanthidae
- Genus: Thamnaconus; J. L. B. Smith, 1949

= Thamnaconus =

Genus of fishes

Thamnaconus is a genus of filefishes native to the Indian and Pacific Oceans.

== Species ==
The following species are recognized in the genus Thamnaconus:

- Thamnaconus analis (Waite, 1904)
- Thamnaconus arenaceus (Barnard, 1927) - Sandy filefish
- Thamnaconus degeni (Regan, 1903) - Degen's leatherjacket
- Thamnaconus erythraeensis Bauchot & Maugé, 1978
- Thamnaconus fajardoi (J. L. B. Smith, 1953) - Spotted filefish
- Thamnaconus fijiensis (Hutchins & Matsuura, 1984)
- Thamnaconus garrettii Fowler, 1928
- Thamnaconus hypargyreus (Cope, 1871) - Lesser-spotted leatherjacket
- Thamnaconus melanoproctes (Boulenger, 1889) - Blackvent filefish
- Thamnaconus modestoides (Barnard, 1927) - Modest filefish
- Thamnaconus modestus (Günther, 1877) - Black scraper
- Thamnaconus multilineatus (Tanaka, 1918)
- Thamnaconus paschalis (Regan, 1913) - Easter filefish
- Thamnaconus septentrionalis (Günther, 1874)
- Thamnaconus striatus (Kotthaus, 1979)
- Thamnaconus tessellatus (Günther, 1880) - Tessellated leatherjacket
