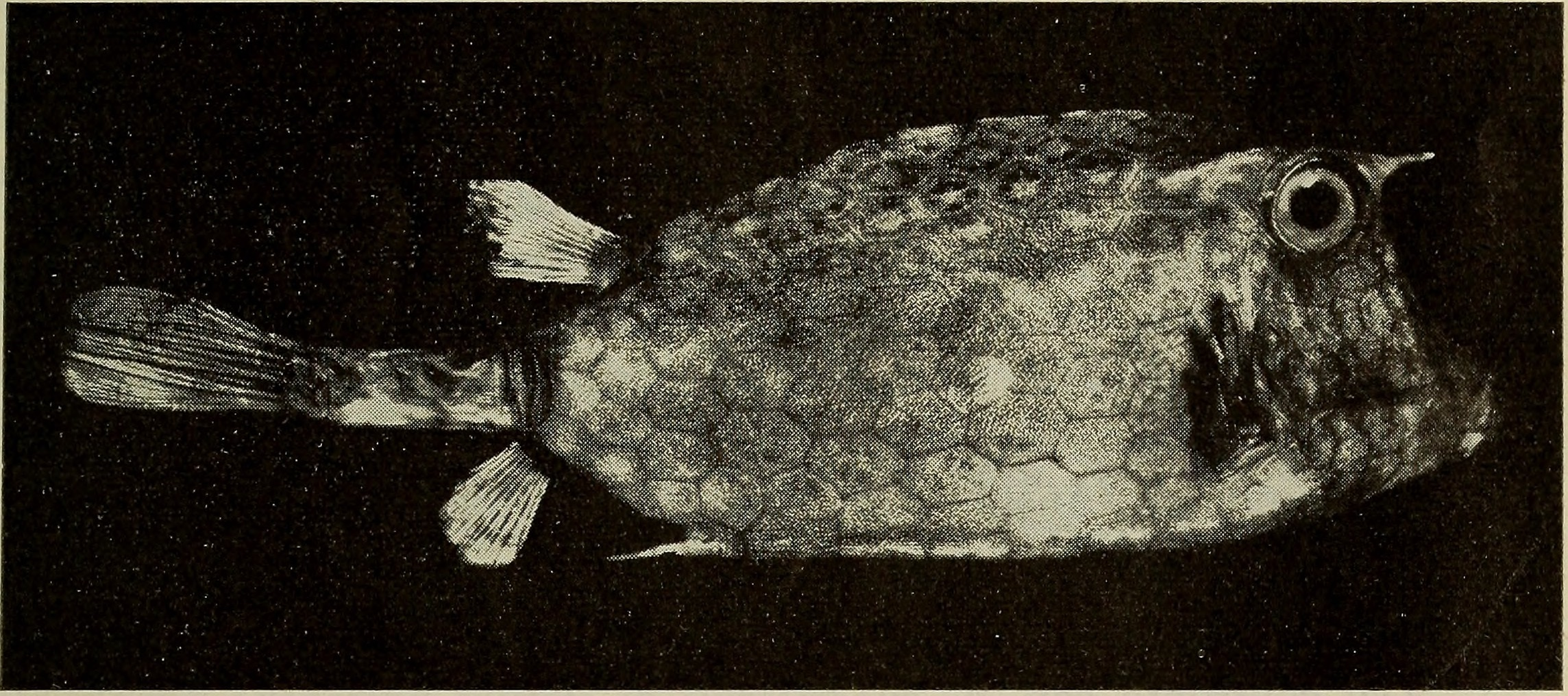

Conservation status
- Data Deficient (IUCN 3.1)

Scientific classification
- Kingdom: Animalia
- Phylum: Chordata
- Class: Actinopterygii
- Division: Teleostei
- Order: Tetraodontiformes
- Superfamily: Ostracioidea
- Family: Ostraciidae
- Genus: Acanthostracion
- Species: A. notacanthus

Binomial name
- Acanthostracion notacanthus (Bleeker, 1863)

Synonyms
- Lactophrys notacanthus (Bleeker, 1863); Ostracion notacanthus Bleeker, 1863; Ostracion quadricornis notacanthus Bleeker, 1863

= Island cowfish =

Species of fish

The island cowfish (Acanthostracion notacanthus), also known as the hogfish, bottlefish boxfish or island boxfish, is a species of marine ray-finned fish belonging to the family Ostraciidae, the cowfishes. This fish is found around the islands of the mid-Atlantic Ocean and has been recorded from Western Africa.

== Taxonomy ==
The island cowfish was first formally described in 1863 as Ostracion notacanthus by the Dutch physician, herpetologist and ichthyologist Pieter Bleeker, with its type locality given as Saint Helena. The 5th edition of Fishes of the World classifies the genus Acanthostracion in the within the family Ostraciidae in the suborder Ostracioidea within the order Tetraodontiformes.

== Etymology ==
Acanthostracion nothacanthus is classified within the genus Acanthostracion, this name combines acanthus, which means "spine" or "thorn", with ostracion. Bleeker originally proposed this taxon as a subgenus of the genus Ostracion The Specific name, nothacanthus, combines notos, which means "back" with acanthos, meaning "spine" or "thorn", a reference to the spine-like projection on the third plate-like scale of the carapce from the origin of the dorsal fin.

== Description ==
The island cowfish has 10 soft rays in both the dorsal and anal fin and there is a spine on the carapace to the front of the dorsal fin, near the middle of the back. The carapace is closed at its rear end and has no ventral ridge with only poorly developed lateral ridges. There are spines in front of the eyes. The overall colour is yellowish with each plate-like scale of the carapace, which covers most of the body, having an frequently incomplete dark margin which may be rounded or polygonal. The island cowfish has a maximum published total length of 50 cm (20 in).

== Distribution and habitat ==
The island cowfish is found around some of the islands in the mid-Atlantic Ocean, the Azores, Saint Helena and Ascension Island. It is also found off Western Africa where it has been recorded from Ghana, Angola and São Tomé. It is found at depths between 3 and 25 m (9.8 and 82.0 ft) over rocks, rubble and sand, and has been recorded on shallow reefs.
