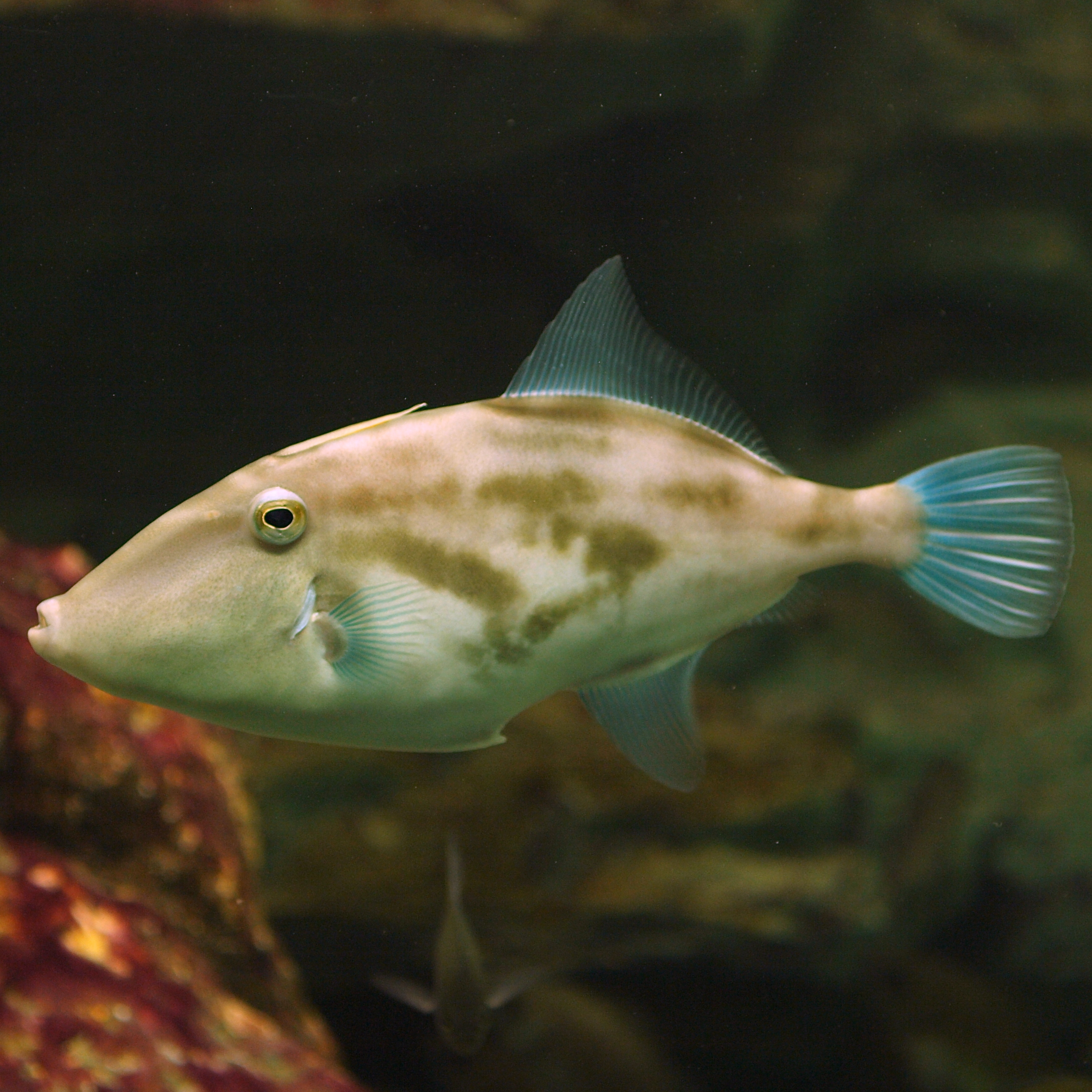

Conservation status
- Least Concern (IUCN 3.1)

Scientific classification
- Kingdom: Animalia
- Phylum: Chordata
- Class: Actinopterygii
- Order: Tetraodontiformes
- Family: Monacanthidae
- Genus: Thamnaconus
- Species: T. modestus

Binomial name
- Thamnaconus modestus Günther, 1877

Synonyms
- Navodon modestus (Whitley, 1930)

= Black scraper =

Species of fish

The black scraper (Thamnaconus modestus) is a species of filefish in the family Monacanthidae. It is found in the temperate waters in the Northwest Pacific Ocean. It is commercially fished in China, and has been successfully aquacultured.

== Sources ==
- Froese, Rainer; Pauly, Daniel (eds.). "Thamnaconus modestus". FishBase. February 2015 version.

"Thamnaconus modestus" .IUCN Red List of Threatened Species. 2019
