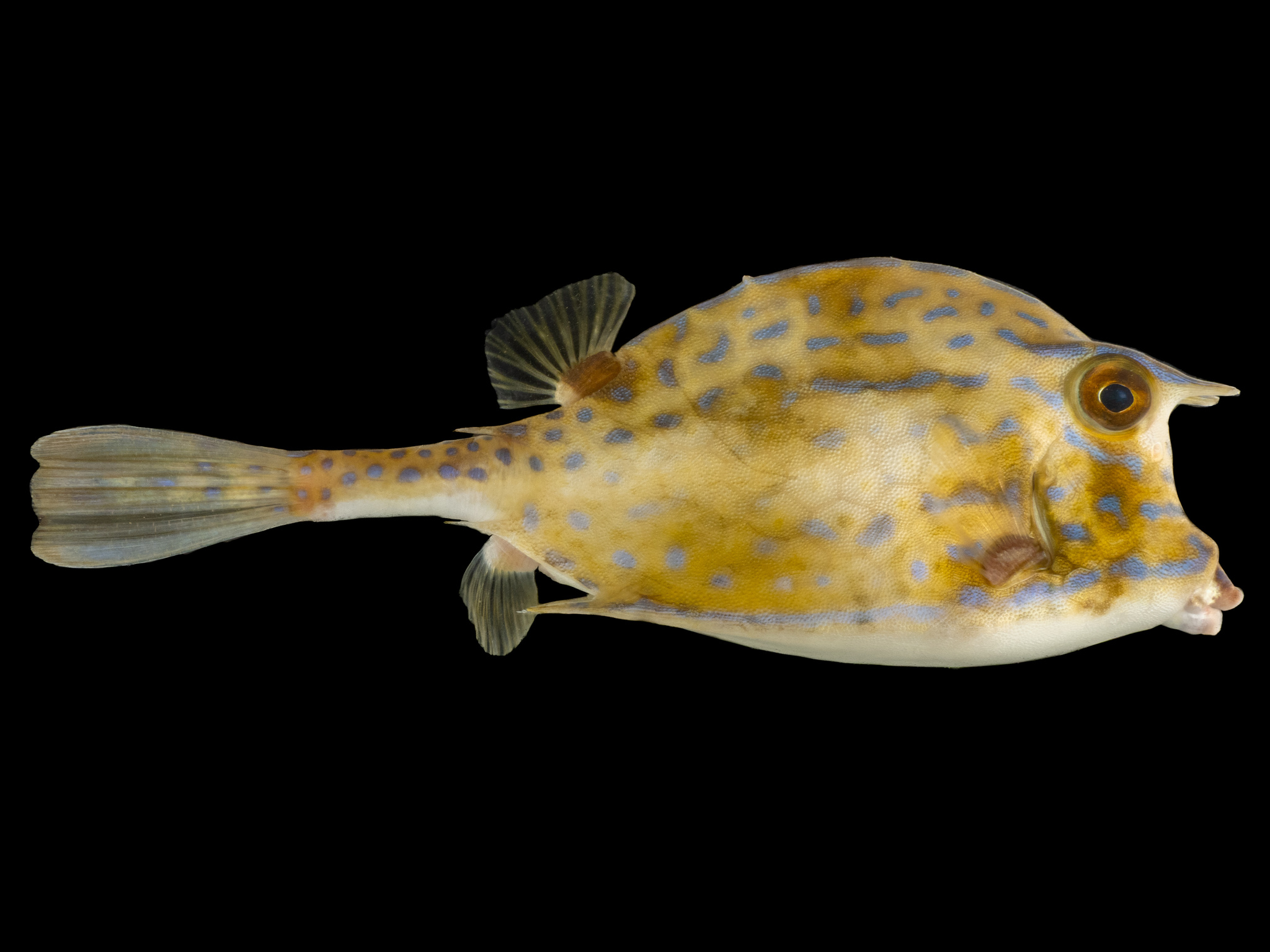

Conservation status
- Least Concern (IUCN 3.1)

Scientific classification
- Kingdom: Animalia
- Phylum: Chordata
- Class: Actinopterygii
- Division: Teleostei
- Order: Tetraodontiformes
- Superfamily: Ostracioidea
- Family: Ostraciidae
- Genus: Acanthostracion
- Species: A. quadricornis

Binomial name
- Acanthostracion quadricornis (Linnaeus, 1758)

Synonyms
- List: Ostracion quadricornis Linnaeus, 1758; Lactophrys quadricornis (Linnaeus, 1758); Ostracion tricornis Linnaeus, 1758; Acanthostracion tricornis (Linnaeus, 1758); Lactophrys tricornis (Linnaeus, 1758)

= Scrawled cowfish =

Species of fish

The scrawled cowfish (Acanthostracion quadricornis) is a species of marine ray-finned fish belonging to the family Ostraciidae, the boxfishes. This species is found in the Western Atlantic Ocean.

== Taxonomy ==
The scrawled cowfish was first formally described as Ostracion quadricornis by Carl Linnaeus in the 10th edition of Systema Naturae, published in 1758. Linnaeus erroneously gave the type locality of this species as "India". In 1865 Pieter Bleeker proposed a new subgenus of Ostracion which he called Acanthostracion. Bleeker did not designate a type species when he first used the name in his paper, (Note: Notice sur les ostracions, confondus sous le nom d'Ostracion quadricornis L. et description des Ostracion notacanthus et guineensis) but he designated Ostracion quadricornis as the type species later that year when he published his Atlas ichthyologique des Indes Orientalis Neerlandais.

The 5th edition of Fishes of the World classifies the genus Acanthostracion within the family Ostraciidae, in the suborder Ostracioidea, within the order Tetraodontiformes.

== Etymology ==
The scrawled cowfish is classified within the genus Acanthostracion, which combines acanthus, referring to a "spine" or "thorn", with ostracion. Bleeker originally proposed this taxon as a subgenus of Ostracion. The specific name, quadricornis, means "four horned", a reference to the superorbital spines and those at each lower rear corner of the fish's carapace. The name "cowfish" refers to the spines above its eyes, which resemble the horns of a cow.

== Distribution and habitat ==
The scrawled cowfish is found in the Western Atlantic Ocean, where it occurs from Massachusetts and Bermuda, south through the Caribbean Sea and the Gulf of Mexico, and along the coast of South America as far south as southern Brazil, including Trindade Island. This species occurs in shallow water, down to around 80 m (260 ft), most frequently being found in seagrass beds. Along the coast of the Yucatan Peninsula, the scrawled cowfish inhabits the marine zones of lagoon ecosystems.

== Description ==
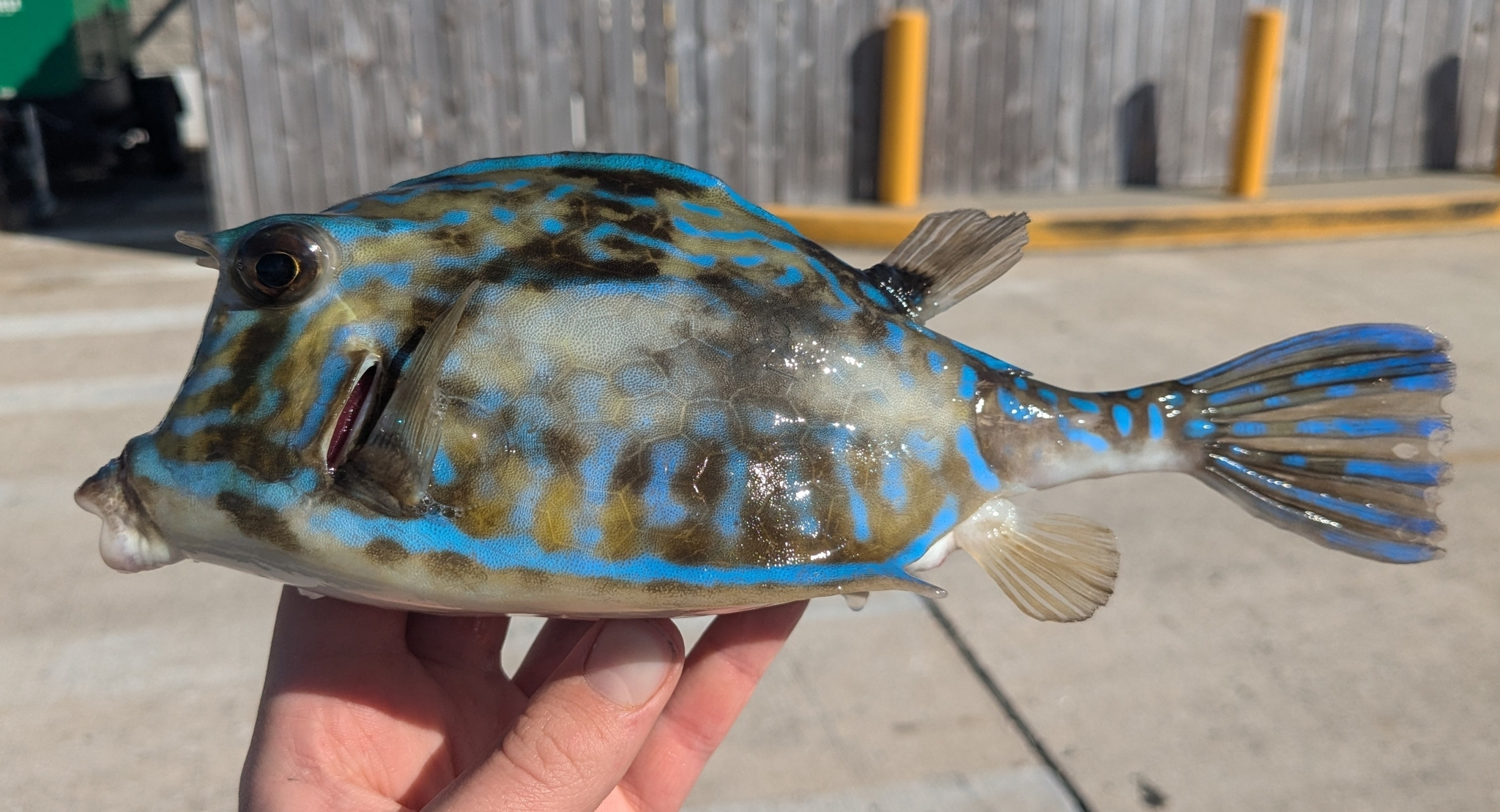
In Florida

The scrawled cowfish has a thick, oblong body, which is largely enclosed in a thickened carapace with enlarged, plate-like hexagonal scales that are jointed with each other, the mouth, eyes, gills, fins, and the caudal peduncle. The bases of the dorsal and anal fins are completely encircled by the carapace. A pair of large spines projects over and beyond the eyes from each orbit. Another pair of spines occurs at each lower, rear corner of the carapace, and the isolated plate-like scales on the upper and lower caudal peduncle are also expanded into short spines. The small mouth has fleshy lips, and each jaw is equipped with fifteen moderately-sized conical teeth. The dorsal and anal fins both have ten soft rays.

Juvenile, in Bonaire

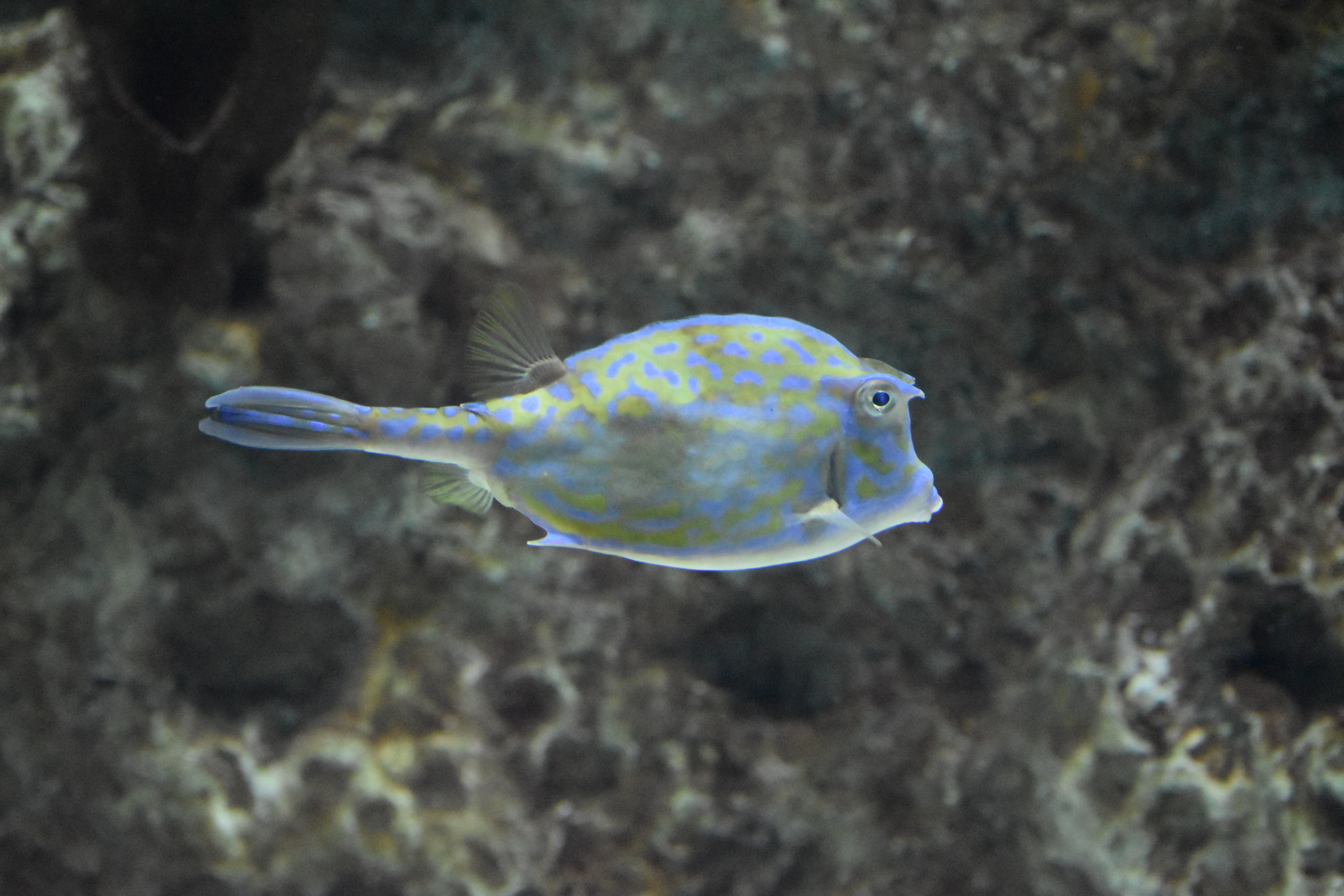
In captivity

The overall color of the fish varies from gray-brown to yellowish green, with a longitudinal blue strip running from the snout to the origin of the anal fin. There are many irregular blackish-blue to bright blue stripes and spots on the body. The cheeks are marked with three or four parallel blue stripes, although the blue markings are absent in some individuals. The juveniles are an overall pale gray-brown, marked with blue spots having dark edges. The maximum published total length of the scrawled cowfish is 55 cm (22 in).

== Biology ==
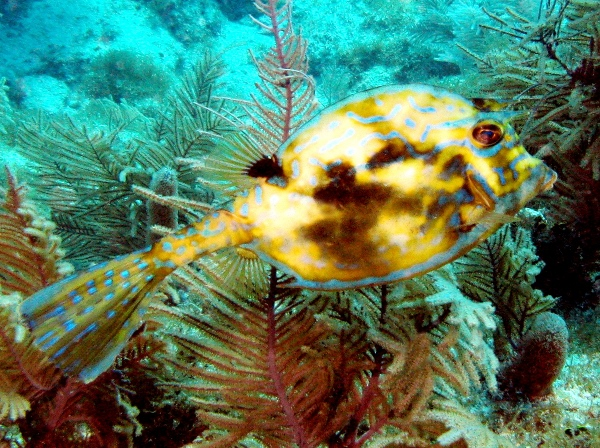
Adult

The scrawled cowfish feeds on sessile invertebrates including tunicates, gorgonians, and sea anemones as well as slow-moving crustaceans, sponges, hermit crabs and some marine vegetation. This species has been recorded spawning in January and February, and between June and the end of September in Venezuelan waters. The eggs and larvae are pelagic, with settlement taking place following metamorphosis of the larvae into juveniles.

== Importance to humans ==
Scrawled cowfish are regarded as quite tasty if cooked properly. It is locally abundant in the Caribbean region, and often sold fresh. In many places around the world they are used as an aquarium fish because of their beautiful coloration.
