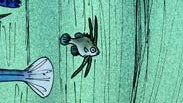
- Life restoration

Scientific classification
- Kingdom: Animalia
- Phylum: Chordata
- Class: Actinopterygii
- Order: Tetraodontiformes
- Family: †Cretatriacanthidae
- Genus: †Cretatriacanthus; Tyler & Sorbini, 1996
- Species: †C. guidottii

Binomial name
- †Cretatriacanthus guidottii Tyler & Sorbini, 1996

= Cretatriacanthus =

Cretatriacanthus Temporal range: Late Campanian/Early Maastrichtian

Extinct genus of fishes

Cretatriacanthus is an extinct genus of prehistoric marine ray-finned fish from the Late Cretaceous. It contains a single species, C. guidottii from the late Campanian or early Maastrichtian of Nardò, Italy. It is generally placed as a basal tetraodontiform, although more recent studies have disputed this, finding it to instead represent an early basal percomorph (under an expanded treatment of Acanthuriformes).

It can be distinguished by its tall dorsal fin of elongated spines, which shows similarities to that of the modern genus Triacanthus. Spines are also present on its pelvic fins.

== See also ==
- Prehistoric fish
- List of prehistoric bony fish
