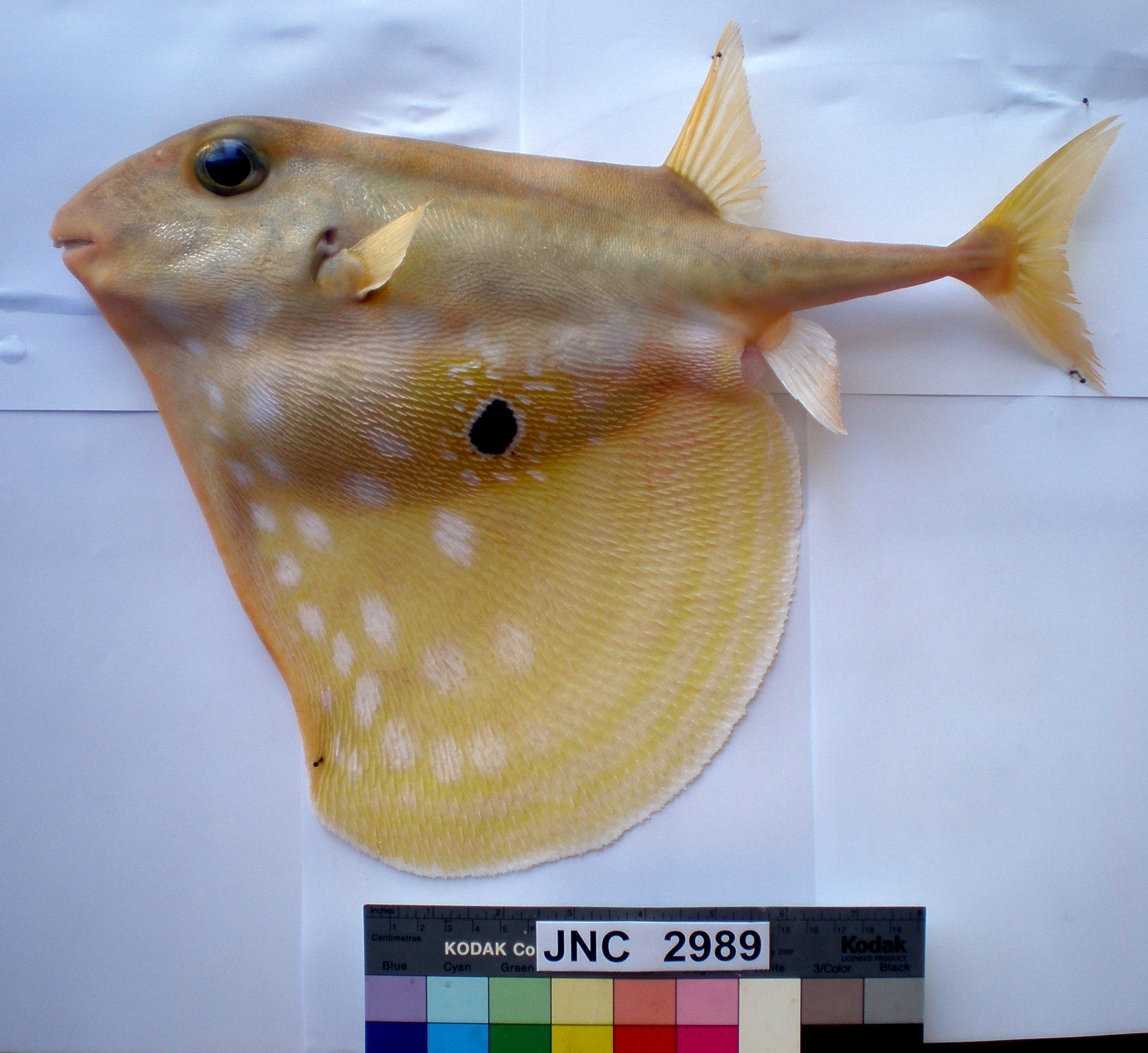
- Triodon macropterus, with extended belly flap

Scientific classification
- Kingdom: Animalia
- Phylum: Chordata
- Class: Actinopterygii
- Order: Tetraodontiformes
- Suborder: Tetraodontoidei
- Family: Triodontidae; Bleeker, 1859
- Genus: Triodon; Cuvier, 1829
- Species: T. macropterus

Binomial name
- Triodon macropterus Lesson, 1829

Synonyms
- Triodon bursarius Cuvier, 1829

= Threetooth puffer =

Threetooth puffer Temporal range: Early Eocene to present

Species of fish

Triodon macropterus (common name the threetooth puffer and the black-spot keeled pufferfish) is a tetraodontiform fish, the only living species in the genus Triodon and family Triodontidae. Other members of the family are known from fossils stretching back to the Eocene. The threetooth puffer was first scientifically described by René Lesson in 1831 and is recognizable for its large belly flap which has the ability to blend into the body when fully retracted.

== Taxonomy ==
The threetooth puffer was first formally described in 1829 by the French naturalist René Lesson with its type locality given as Mauritius. That same year Georges Cuvier formally proposed the new genus Triodon for the new species, also mentioning Triodon bursarius, although this is now regarded as a synonym of T. macropterus. The 5th edition of Fishes of the World classifies this taxon within the monotypic family Triodontidae, which it places within the monotypic suborder Triodontoidei within the order Tetraodontiformes.

The family was formerly placed in its own suborder, Triodontoidei. However, more recent taxonomic studies have found it to be closely related to the pufferfish, molas, and porcupinefish, and it is now placed in the suborder Tetraodontoidei with those families.

=== Evolution ===
Triodon is an ancient genus known since the Early Eocene, when the earliest known species, the extinct †Triodon antiquus Leriche, 1905 has been identified from the London Clay of England and the Nanjemoy Formation of Maryland, US. This species closely resembles the modern Triodon macropterus. Also known from the London Clay is the extinct genus †Ctenoplectus Close et al., 2016, which is thought to be the sister genus to Triodon.

== Etymology ==
The name Triodon macropterus comes from the Ancient Greek τρι- (tri-, meaning 'three') and ὀδούς (or ὀδών, odoús, odṓn, meaning 'tooth'), and refers to the three fused teeth that make up a beak-like structure.

== Distribution and ecology ==
The threetooth puffer is native to the Indo-Pacific, where it is found mainly around Australia and off the coast of Asia at depths from 30–300 m (100–980 ft). Its habitat is pelagic, consisting of continental shelves, slopes, seamounts, and knolls.

== Diet and digestion ==
Little is known about the diet of the threetooth puffer. However, a dissection of the stomach of a caught juvenile specimen uncovered traces of mysid crustacean, foraminifera, echinoids, and sponges.

The intestinal tract of the threetooth puffer (the esophagus, stomach, and intestines) is lined with several papillae, protrusions of the gut lumen. After the stomach, the tract branches off into a specialized sac-like compartment called Tyler's Pouch. Within the Tyler's Pouch the papillae are much larger in size and number compared to those prior. The role and function of Tyler's Pouch is largely unknown.

== Adult characteristics ==
The threetooth puffer reaches a maximum length of 54 cm (21 in). Its body is yellowish-brown with a white belly flap as large as or larger than its body which it inflates with seawater when threatened. The flap is inflated by rotating the shaft-like pelvis downwards, exposing a black eye-spot contoured with yellow. This makes the animal appear much larger to predators, and less likely to be eaten. When danger is not present, the flap is retracted seamlessly into the body and the eye-spot is not visible.

The head of an adult threetooth puffer makes up approximately 30.6% of the length of its body, and the eyes make up about 7.5% of its body length. The upper jaw is composed of two dental plates while the teeth on the lower jaw protrude from a single dental plate, resulting in a beak.

The threetooth puffer has ribs, a beak, and no pelvic fins which are all characteristics of tetraodontiformes.

Adult scales have a rhombic base, and each has a median ridge from which several spines protrude.

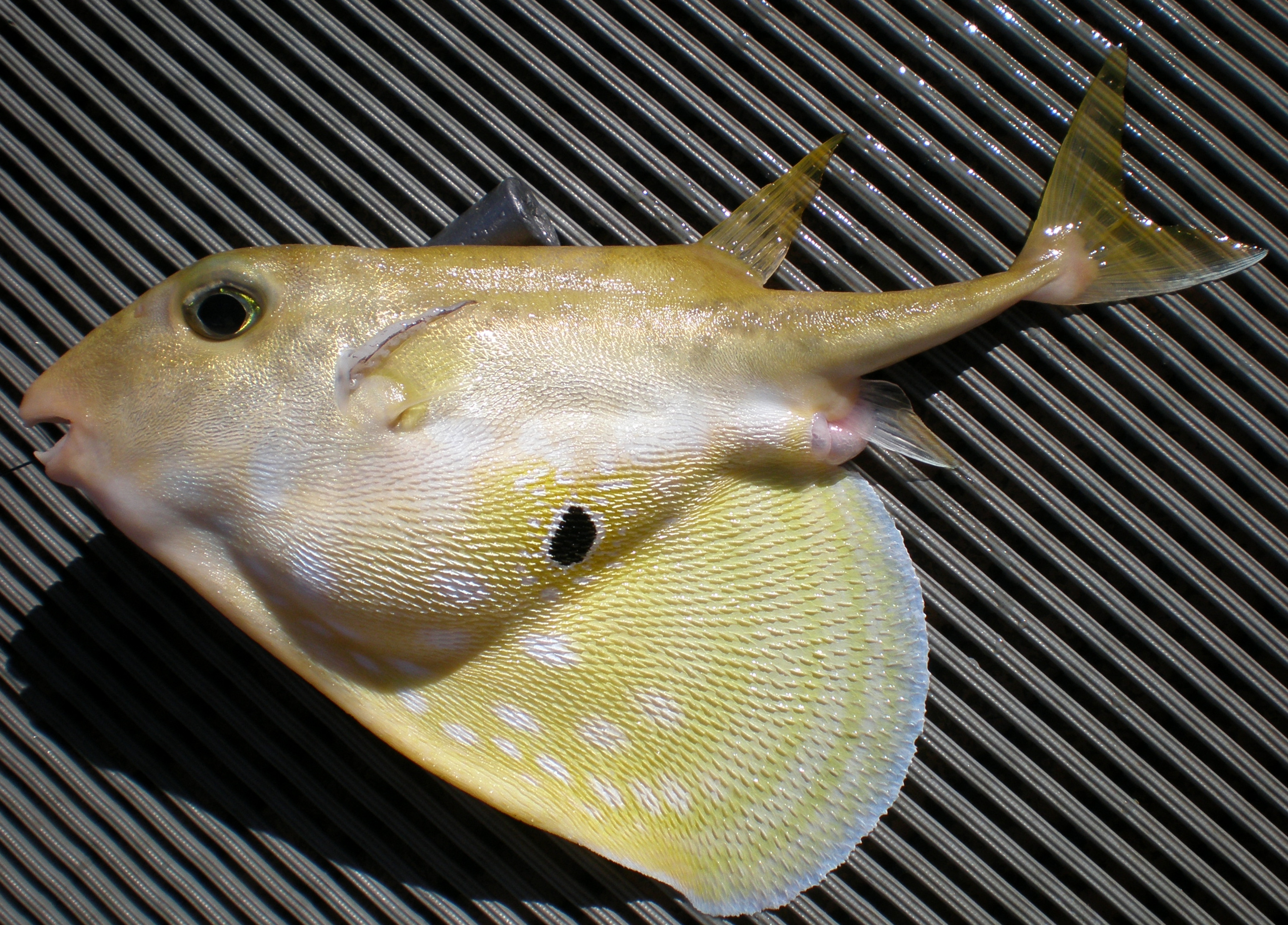
Living specimen, belly flap half extended

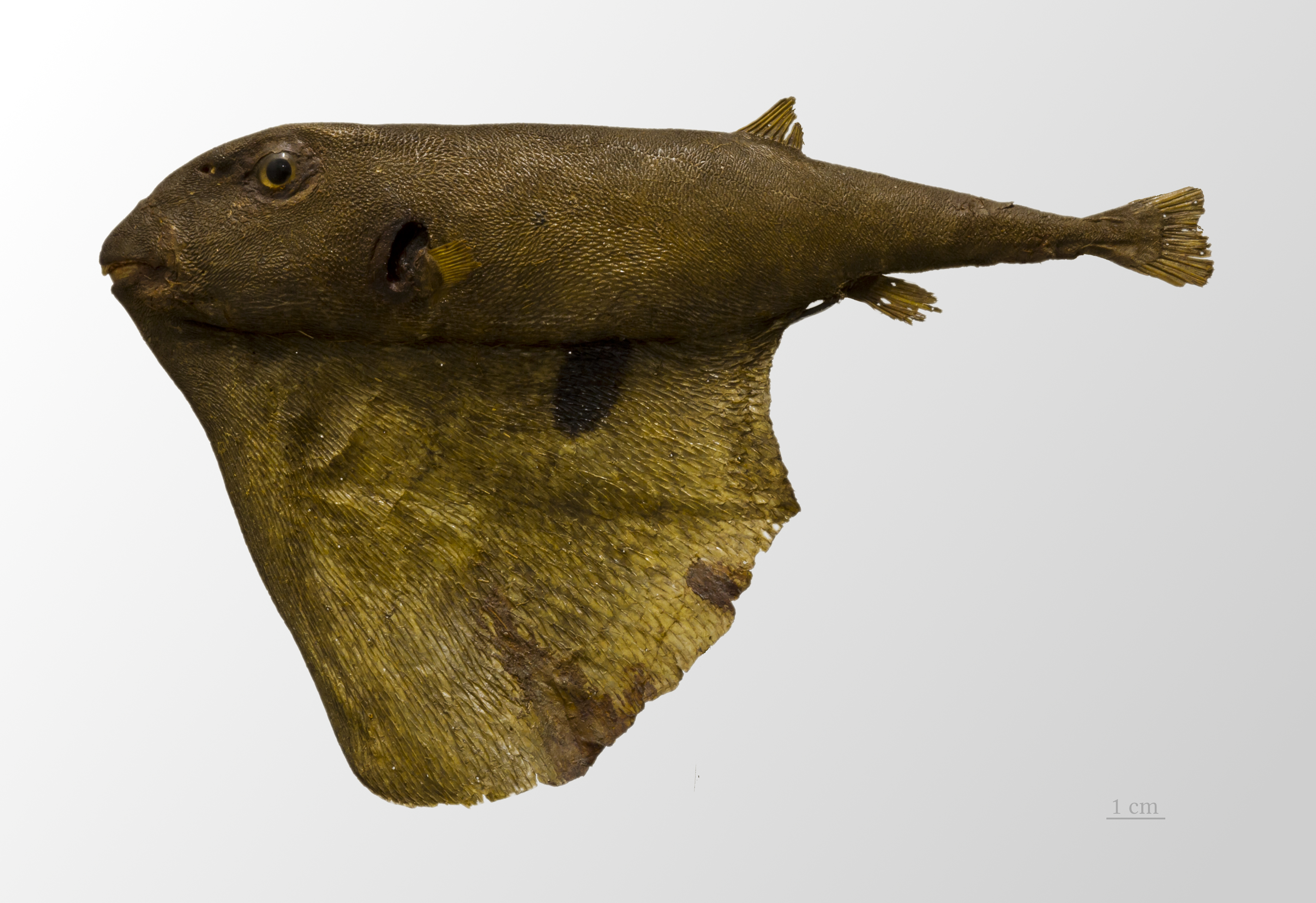
Desiccated museum specimen

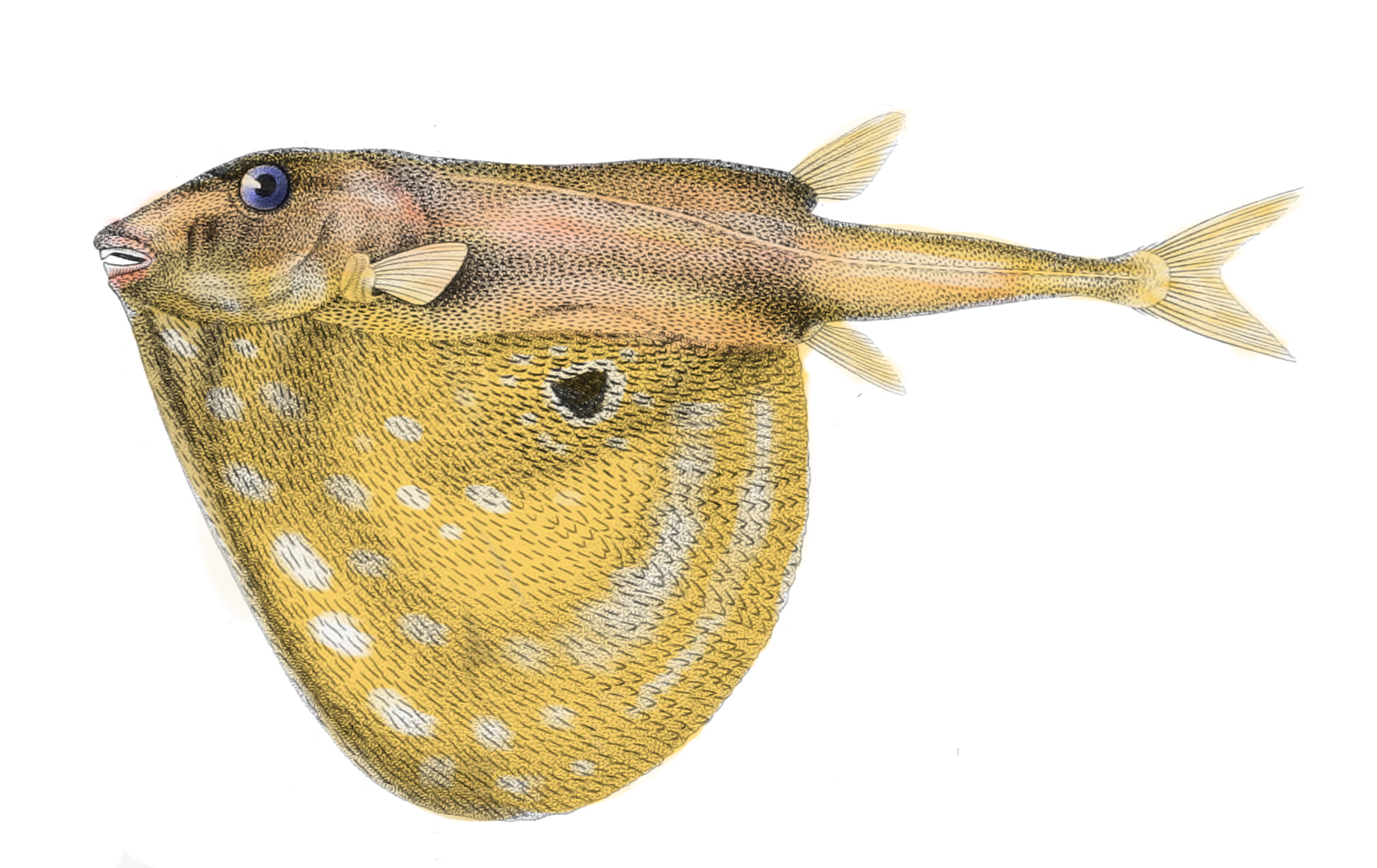
Illustrated specimen by Cuvier

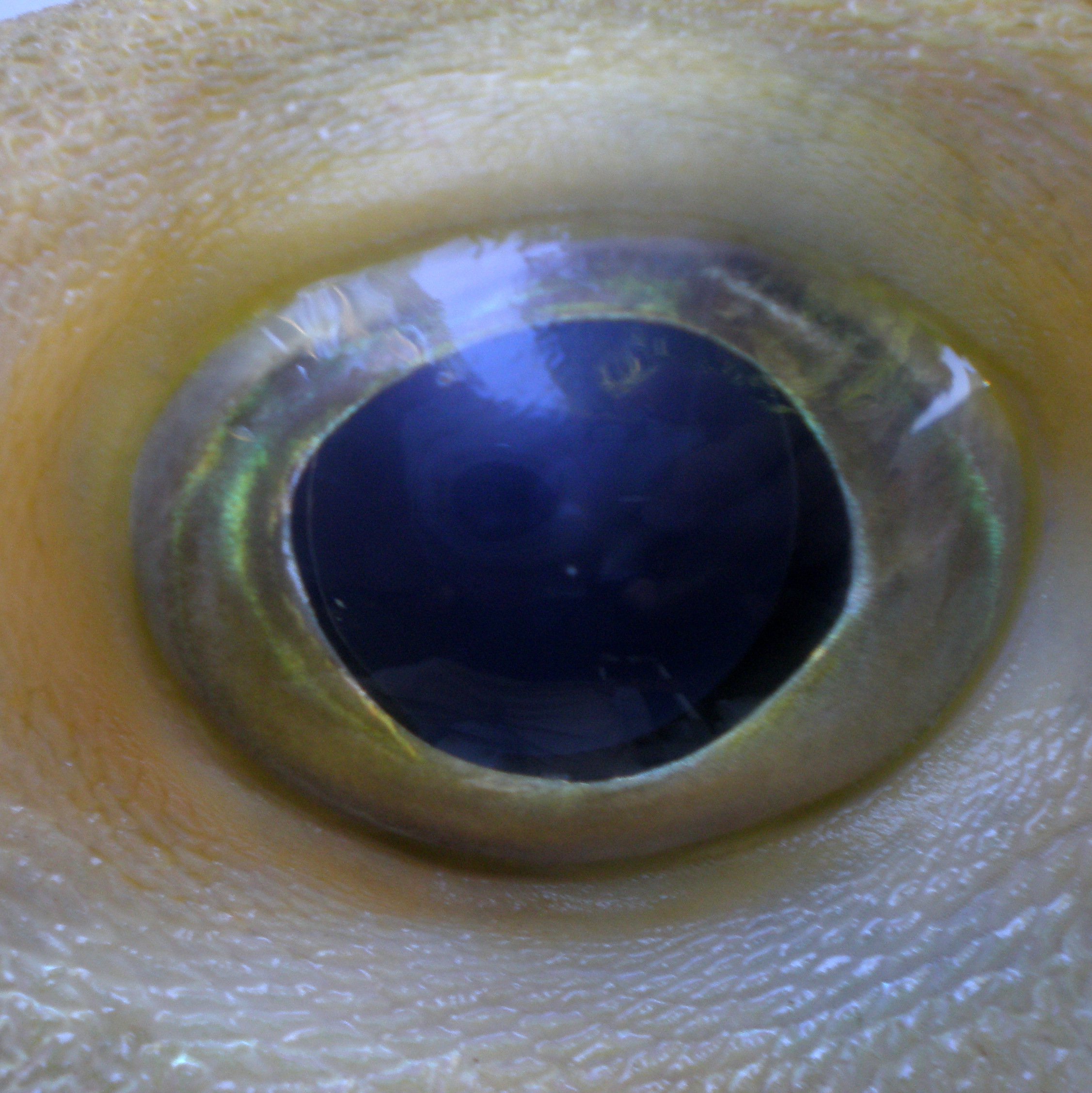
Eye

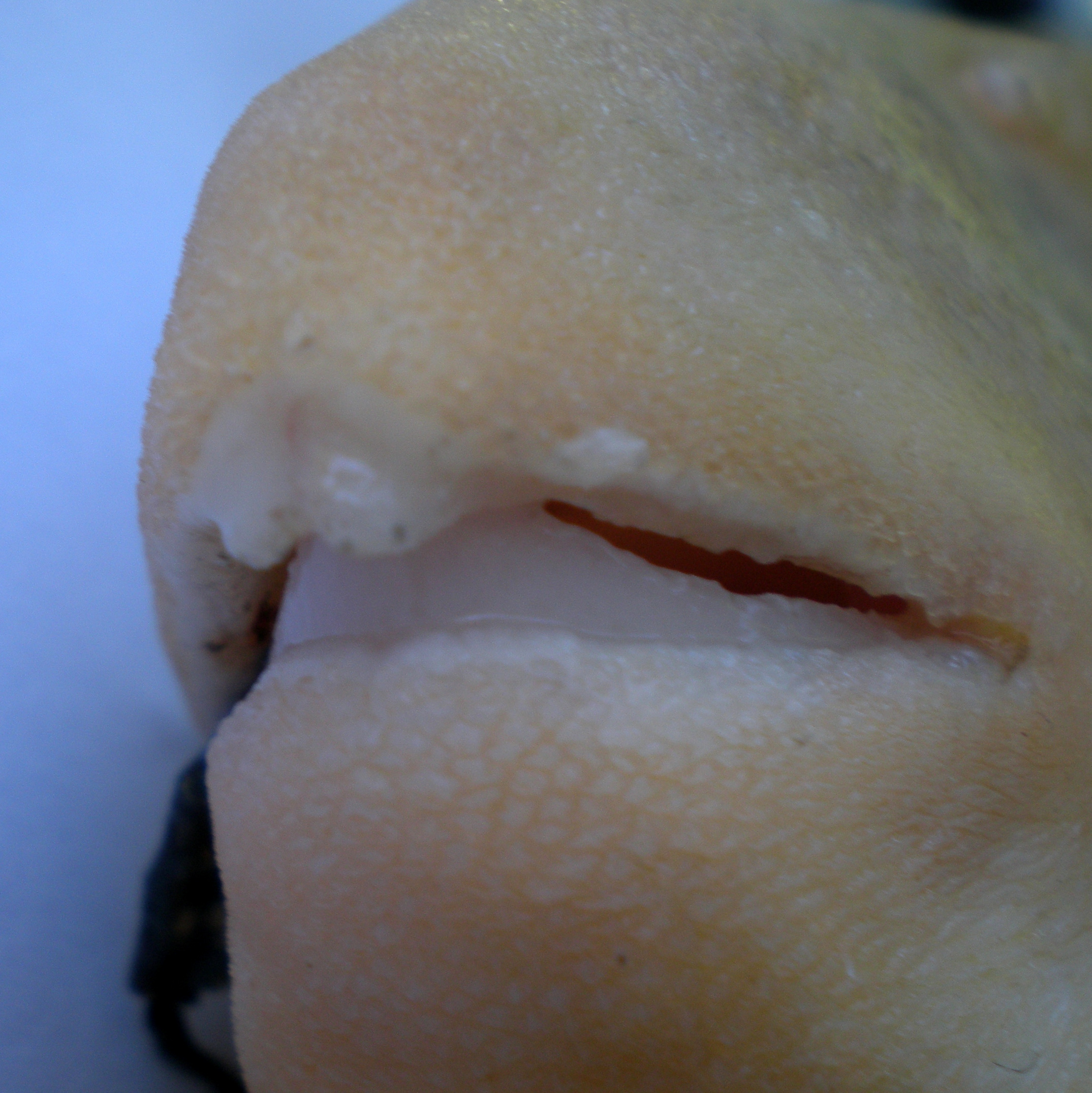
Beak-like structure composed of fused teeth

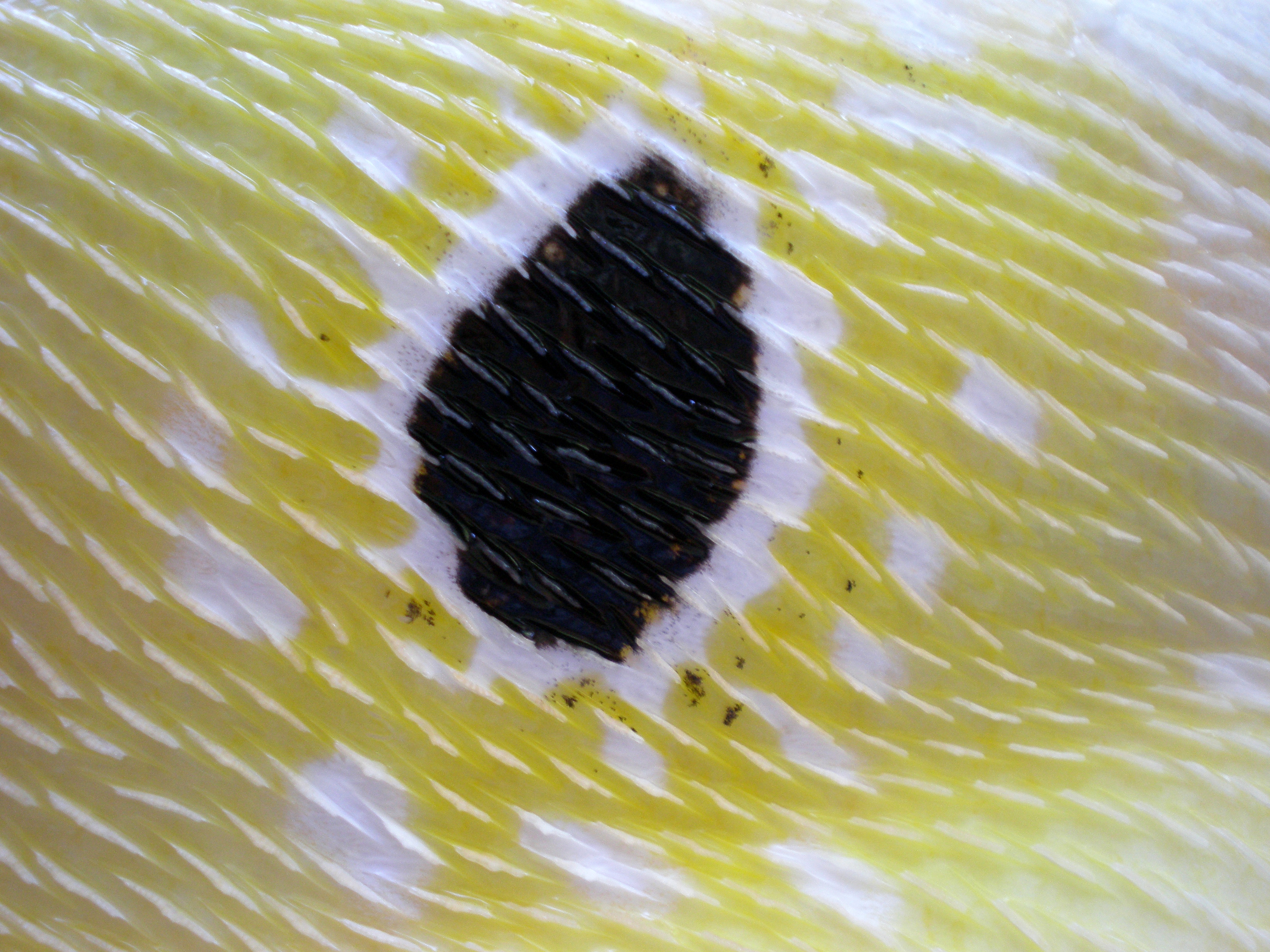
Lateral eye-spot

== Juvenile characteristics ==
The smallest Triodon macropterus specimen on record measures 20mm long and belongs to the ichthyological section of the Muséum Nationale d'Histoire Naturelle in Paris. The head of the specimen makes up 45% of the length of its body, and its eyes make up 18% of its body length. As a juvenile, the pelvic bone is continuing to develop within the rotund belly.

Juveniles have unicuspid scales, tricuspid scales, and pentacuspid scales.

== Danger to humans ==
Triodon macropterus is harmless to humans unless eaten, at which point the species is considered poisonous.

== See also ==
- Tetraodontidae
- Tetraodontiformes
- Ostraciidae
- Triacanthodidae
