= Honeycomb cowfish =

- At Cozumel

Conservation status
- Least Concern (IUCN 3.1)

Scientific classification
- Kingdom: Animalia
- Phylum: Chordata
- Class: Actinopterygii
- Division: Teleostei
- Order: Tetraodontiformes
- Superfamily: Ostracioidea
- Family: Ostraciidae
- Genus: Acanthostracion
- Species: A. polygonius

Binomial name
- Acanthostracion polygonius Poey, 1876

Synonyms
- Lactophrys polygonia (Poey, 1876); Lactophrys saxatilis Mowbray, 1931

Species of fish

The honeycomb cowfish (Acanthostracion polygonius), is a species of marine ray-finned fish belonging to the family Ostraciidae, the boxfishes. This fish is found in the Western Atlantic Ocean.

== Taxonomy ==
The honeycomb cowfish was first formally described as Acanthostracion polygonius in 1876 by the Cuban zoologist Felipe Poey with Cuba given as its type locality. The 5th edition of Fishes of the World classifies the genus Acanthostracion in the within the family Ostraciidae in the suborder Ostracioidea within the order Tetraodontiformes.

== Etymology ==
The honeycomb cowfish is classified within the genus Acanthostracion, this name combines acanthus, which means "spine" or "thorn", with ostracion. Bleeker originally proposed this taxon as a subgenus of the genus Ostracion The Specific name, polygonius, means "many angled", a reference to the hexagonal patterning on the carapace of this fish.

== Distribution ==
This species is distributed throughout the western Atlantic, the Caribbean Sea, and waters near Brazil. They are absent throughout most of the Gulf of Mexico, but there are populations around Florida.

== Description ==
At Cozumel

The honeycomb cowfish has armor-like, hexagonal scales covering most of its body. It is named for its unique honeycomb-like pattern and "horns". This pattern helps the fish to blend in with coral reefs. Most honeycomb cowfish tend to be blue in color, but can also be yellow, gray, or green. Juveniles are generally more colorful than adults. They have no pelvic fins, and the caudal fin is rounded.

In captivity

Honeycomb cowfish have several modified bony scales and "horns." These serve as a means of protection. Honeycomb cowfish can be distinguished from similar fish by the two spines above their eyes and hexagonal pattern. Compared to other boxfish, the honeycomb cowfish has a smaller, protruding mouth and fleshy lips.

The maximum body length is 50 centimeters, but the average length is 25 centimeters.

== Habitat ==
The honeycomb cowfish lives in warm, clear waters near coral reefs, sea grass beds, and in estuaries. It is an uncommon and cautious species.

== Behavior ==
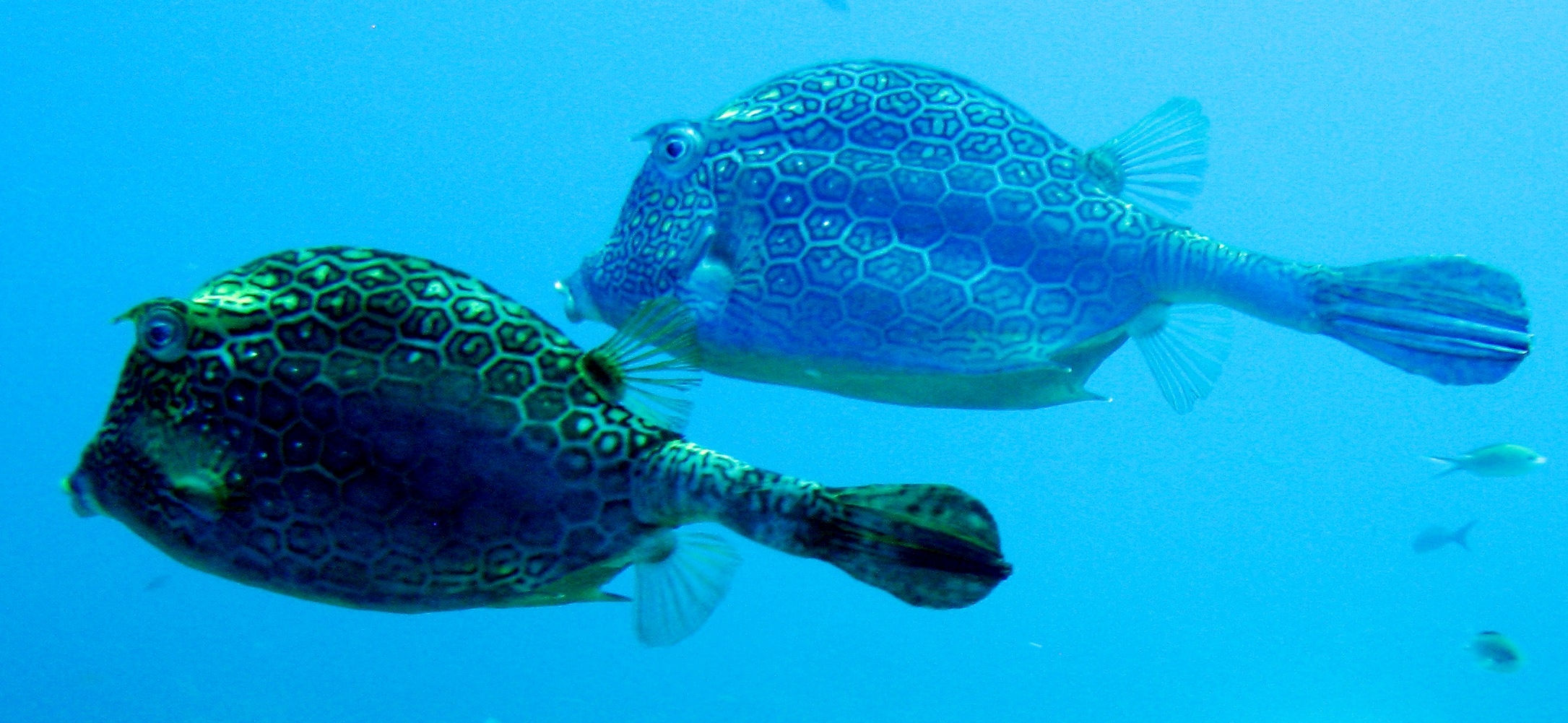
In the Gulf of Mexico

Honeycomb cowfish are usually solitary, but can be seen in groups of threes consisting of one male and two females. Little is known about their reproduction, but they are known to mate in open water. They have been observed quickly swimming to the surface in pairs, releasing their gametes, and quickly swimming back down.

Honeycomb cowfish have the ability to change color in order to protect themselves from predation. Once camouflaged, the fish can remain stationary for long periods of time.

The juveniles have better swimming abilities than adults due to their rounder bodies.

== Diet ==
Feeding occurs during the day. Their diet consists of small marine invertebrates including shrimp, sponges, algae, tunicates, and worms.

== Human use ==
The honeycomb cowfish is considered to be a valuable food fish. It is marketed fresh, and is prized in the Caribbean where it is abundant. There have been several reports of ciguatera poisoning from the consumption of this fish. It is also sold commercially as an aquarium fish.
