= Thamnaconus hypargyreus =

Conservation status
- Least Concern (IUCN 3.1)

Scientific classification
- Kingdom: Animalia
- Phylum: Chordata
- Class: Actinopterygii
- Order: Tetraodontiformes
- Family: Monacanthidae
- Genus: Thamnaconus
- Species: T. hypargyreus

Binomial name
- Thamnaconus hypargyreus (Cope, 1871)

Synonyms
- Monacanthus hypargyreus Cope; Thamnaconus xanthopterus (Xu & Zhan, 1988)

Species of fish

Thamnaconus hypargyreus, commonly known as the lesser-spotted leatherjacket, yellowspotted leatherjacket, or the yellow-fin filefish, is a fish native to the coastal waters of the South and East China Seas and northern Australian coast.

== Taxonomy ==
Thamnaconus hypargyreus is a species of the genus Thamnaconus of the family Monacanthidae, a group commonly known as filefishes.

== Description ==
The maximum total length of T. hypargyreus is 21.2 cm. The body is a dusky orange-cream toward the top, with blue tints on the head and back, and a cream colour below.

== Distribution and habitat ==
Thamnaconus hypargyreus inhabit the southeastern Indian Ocean from around northern Western Australia, Queensland, to southern New South Wales, Australia, as well as southern Papua New Guinea, and the East and South China Seas from southern Japan to around Taiwan to Hainan Island, China . It inhabits the sandy bottoms of neritic waters 10–235 m deep, though is typically not found deeper than 130 m.

=== Conservation status ===
The IUCN Red List categorizes T. hypargyreus as Least Concern, the justification for which being the species' broad distribution. While the yield from trawling in the South China Sea declined rapidly due to population decline as a consequence of pressure from fisheries since the 1980s, the Australian populations are not commercially targeted by local fishing, but are a bycatch in Queensland's deepwater eastern king prawn trawl fishery, and Australian populations are therefor not endangered by local fishing. Since 2000, bycatch reduction devices have been required as part of Australia's fishery management plan, resulting in reduced local trawling efforts in addition to reduced bycatch.

Climate change may be a future threat for the species.

== Reproduction ==
Thamnaconus hypargyreus consumes plankton, increasing consumption shortly before spawning. The fish become sexually mature at one year of age, approximately 100 mm in length.

== Association with humans ==
The species is caught as trawling bycatch and sold in fish markets as a food fish. In the 1970s, the species was one of the most commercially popular fish in the South China Sea, with a peak yield of 200,000 tons, fished by both Japan and China. Major fisheries still operate in the coastal waters of Pearl River Estuary and western seas of Guangdong, China.
