= Sorbiniperca =

Sorbiniperca scheuchzeri Temporal range: Lutetian

Scientific classification
- Kingdom: Animalia
- Phylum: Chordata
- Class: Actinopterygii
- Order: Acanthuriformes
- Family: †Sorbinipercidae
- Genus: †Sorbiniperca; Tyler, 1999
- Species: †S. scheuchzeri

Binomial name
- †Sorbiniperca scheuchzeri Tyler, 1999

Extinct genus of fishes

Sorbiniperca scheuchzeri is an extinct species of zeiid fish from the Eocene of Monte Bolca. It, and its close relative Sorbinicapros, comprise the extinct zeiform family Sorbinipercidae.
