= Cretatriacanthidae =

Cretatriacanthidae Temporal range: 83–70 Ma Late Cretaceous

Scientific classification
- Kingdom: Animalia
- Phylum: Chordata
- Class: Actinopterygii
- Order: Tetraodontiformes
- Suborder: †Plectocretacicoidei
- Family: †Cretatriacanthidae; Tyler & Sorbini, 1996

Genera
- †Cretatriacanthus; †Slovenitriacanthus

Extinct family of fishes

Cretatriacanthidae is an extinct family of prehistoric marine ray-finned fish from the Late Cretaceous. It contains two genera, both known from southern Europe.

Placed in the suborder Plectocretacicoidei alongside several other similar Cretaceous fish genera, they were long considered the earliest members of the extant order Tetraodontiformes. However, a 2024 study found that many of the alleged shared traits were also found among other acanthomorph lineages, and that other traits present within the Plectocretacicoidei are not known from modern Tetraodontiformes. For this reason, it considered them instead as basal members of an expanded Acanthuriformes (containing Tetraodontiformes and Lophiiformes as superorders, among others).

== Genera ==
- †Cretatriacanthus Tyler & Sorbini, 1996
- †Slovenitriacanthus Tyler & Križnar, 2013
