= Sorbinipercidae =

Sorbinipercidae Temporal range: Lutetian

Scientific classification
- Kingdom: Animalia
- Phylum: Chordata
- Class: Actinopterygii
- Order: Acanthuriformes
- Family: †Sorbinipercidae; Tyler, 1998

Genera
- †Sorbiniperca; †Sorbinicapros

Extinct family of fishes

Sorbinipercidae is an extinct family of zeiid fish from the Eocene of Monte Bolca.
