= Protriacanthus =

Protriacanthus Temporal range: Upper Cretaceous

Scientific classification
- Kingdom: Animalia
- Phylum: Chordata
- Class: Actinopterygii
- Order: Tetraodontiformes
- Family: †Protriacanthidae; Tyler & Sorbini, 1996
- Genus: †Protriacanthus d'Erasmo, 1946
- Species: †P. gortanii

Binomial name
- †Protriacanthus gortanii d'Erasmo, 1946

Extinct genus of fishes

Protriacanthus is an extinct genus of ray-finned fish. It contains a single species, P. gortanii.

== Sources ==
- The Paleobiology Database
