= Zorzinichthys =

Zorzinichthys annae

Scientific classification
- Kingdom: Animalia
- Phylum: Chordata
- Class: Actinopterygii
- Order: Perciformes
- Genus: †Zorzinichthys; Tyler & Bannikov, 2002
- Species: †Z. annae

Binomial name
- †Zorzinichthys annae Tyler & Bannikov, 2002

Extinct genus of fishes

Zorzinichthys is an extinct genus of perciform fish that can be found in rocks and sediments of the Ypresian age at the Monte Bolca fossil site in Italy.
