= Plectocretacicus =

Plectocretacicus Temporal range: Lower Cenomanian

Scientific classification
- Kingdom: Animalia
- Phylum: Chordata
- Class: Actinopterygii
- Order: Tetraodontiformes
- Family: †Plectocretacicidae; Tyler & Sorbini, 1996
- Genus: †Plectocretacicus; Sorbini, 1979
- Species: †P. clarae

Binomial name
- †Plectocretacicus clarae Sorbini, 1979

Extinct genus of fishes

Plectocretacicus is an extinct genus of prehistoric ray-finned fish that lived during the lower Cenomanian epoch. It contains a single species, P. clarae. Plectocretacicus may be the earliest known member of the order Tetraodontiformes.

== See also ==
- Prehistoric fish
- List of prehistoric bony fish
