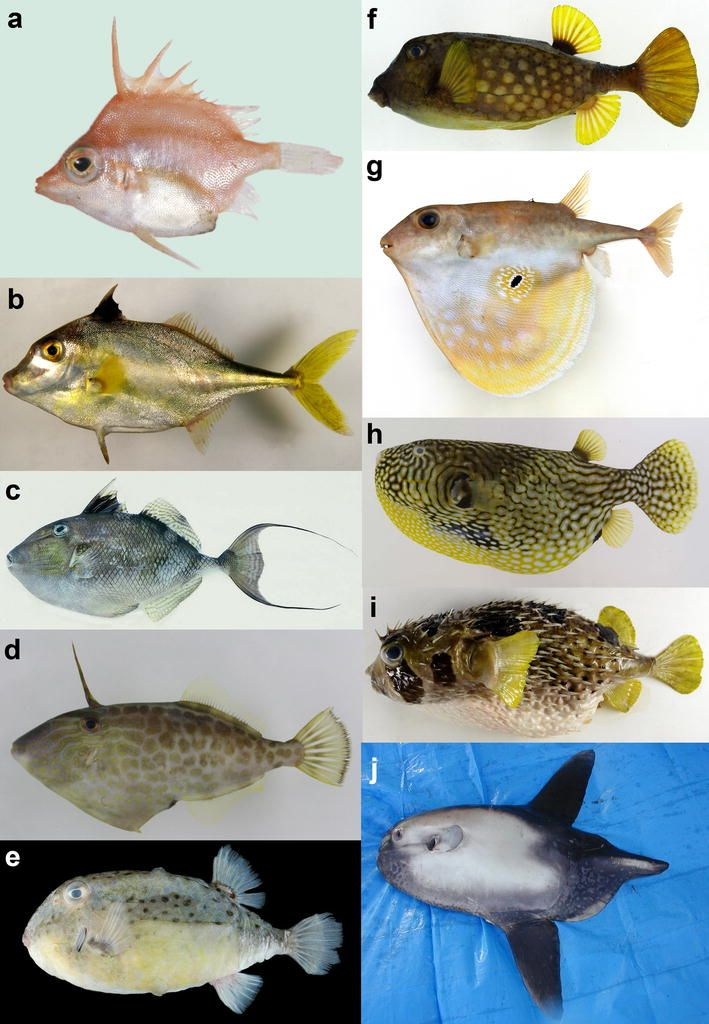
- Representatives of the 10 extant Tetraodontiformes families: a Triacanthodidae, Triacanthodes anomalus; b Triacanthidae, Triacanthus biaculeatus; c Balistidae, Abalistes filamentosus; d Monacanthidae, Thamnaconus hypargyreus; e Aracanidae, Kentrocapros aculeatus; f Ostraciidae, Ostracion immaculatum; g Triodontidae Triodon macropterus; h Tetraodontidae, Arothron mappa; i Diodontidae, Diodon liturosus; j Molidae, Masturus lanceolatus

Scientific classification
- Kingdom: Animalia
- Phylum: Chordata
- Class: Actinopterygii
- Division: Teleostei
- Clade: Percomorpha
- Order: Tetraodontiformes; L. S. Berg, 1940

Type species
- Tetraodon lineatus Linnaeus, 1758

Suborders and families
- See text.

= Tetraodontiformes =

Tetraodontiformes Temporal range: Early Eocene to present Possible Late Cretaceous record

Order of fishes

Tetraodontiformes (/tɛtrə.ɒˈdɒntɪfɔːrmiːz/), also known as the Plectognathi, is an order of ray-finned fishes which includes the pufferfishes and related taxa. This order has been classified as a suborder of the order Perciformes, although recent studies have found that it, as the Tetraodontoidei, is a sister taxon to the anglerfish order Lophiiformes, called Lophiodei, and have placed both taxa within the Acanthuriformes. The Tetraodontiformes are represented by 10 extant families and at around 430 species overall. The majority of the species within this order are marine but a few may be found in freshwater. They are found throughout the world.

== Taxonomy ==
Tetraodontiformes is a name first used for this order in 1940 by Lev Berg, the order was originally proposed in 1817 as the "Les Plectognathes", the Plectognathi. Cuvier divided this into two families, "Les Gymnodontes" and "Les Sclerodermes". In 1940 Berg first used the term Tetraodontiformes for this order and this name is the currently accepted name as it follows the International Code of Zoological Nomenclature rule that a name for a family or higher taxa must have its root based on the type species of that grouping. In this case the type species is Tetraodon lineatus Linnaeus, 1758. The 5th edition of Fishes of the World recognises the order as a derived order within the Actinopterygii and as a monophyletic order within the Percomorpha. Other authorities have proposed that it is not an order but that it is a clade, the Tetraodontoidei, within the order Acanthuriformes and is most closely related to the Lophiodei, the anglerfishes.

== Etymology ==
The name comes from Ancient Greek τετρα- (tetra-), meaning "four", ὀδούς (odoús), meaning "tooth", and Latin formes, meaning "form".

== Evolution ==
Traditionally, the oldest recognized tetraodontiforms are the extinct suborder Plectocretacicoidei from the Late Cretaceous (Santonian to Campanian) of Italy and Slovenia, both in the former Tethyan region. These comprise the families Cretatriacanthidae and Protriacanthidae. Plectocretacicus from the Cenomanian of Lebanon has also been proposed as a tetraodontiform, but this has been more recently questioned. More recent studies have also questioned the placement of the Plectrocretacicoidei in the Tetraodontiformes, due to their ancient nature contrasting with the position of the Tetraodontiformes as the most derived percomorph lineage, and the group displaying many traits that are not present in modern tetraodontiforms or are not exclusively found in them. It has thus been suggested that the Plectocretacicoidei might either represent indeterminate percomorphs or basal members of a more inclusive Acanthuriformes. If the Plectocretacicoidei are excluded, the earliest definitive fossil tetraodontiforms are a number of genera known from the earliest Eocene.

== Description ==
Tetraodontiformes include a variety of body shapes, all radical departures from the streamlined body plan typical of most fishes. These forms range from nearly square or triangular (boxfishes), globose (pufferfishes) to laterally compressed (filefishes and triggerfishes). They range in size from Rudarius excelsus (a filefish), measuring just 2 cm (0.79 in) in length, to the ocean sunfish, the largest of all bony fishes at up to 3 m (9.8 ft) in length and weighing over 2 tonnes.

Most members of this order – except for the family Balistidae – are ostraciiform swimmers, meaning the body is rigid and incapable of lateral flexure. Because of this, they are slow-moving and rely on their pectoral, dorsal, anal, and caudal fins for propulsion rather than body undulation. However, movement is usually quite precise; dorsal and anal fins aid in manoeuvring and stabilizing. In most species, all fins are simple, small, and rounded, except for the pelvic fins which, if present, are fused and buried. Again, in most members, the gill plates are covered over with skin, the only gill opening a small slit above the pectoral fin.

The tetraodontiform strategy seems to be defense at the expense of speed, with all species fortified with scales modified into strong plates or spines – or with tough, leathery skin (the filefishes and ocean sunfish). Another striking defensive attribute found in the pufferfishes and porcupinefishes is the ability to inflate their bodies to greatly increase their normal diameter; this is accomplished by sucking water into a diverticulum of the stomach. Many species of the Tetraodontidae, Triodontidae, and Diodontidae are further protected from predation by tetrodotoxin, a powerful neurotoxin concentrated in the animals' internal organs.

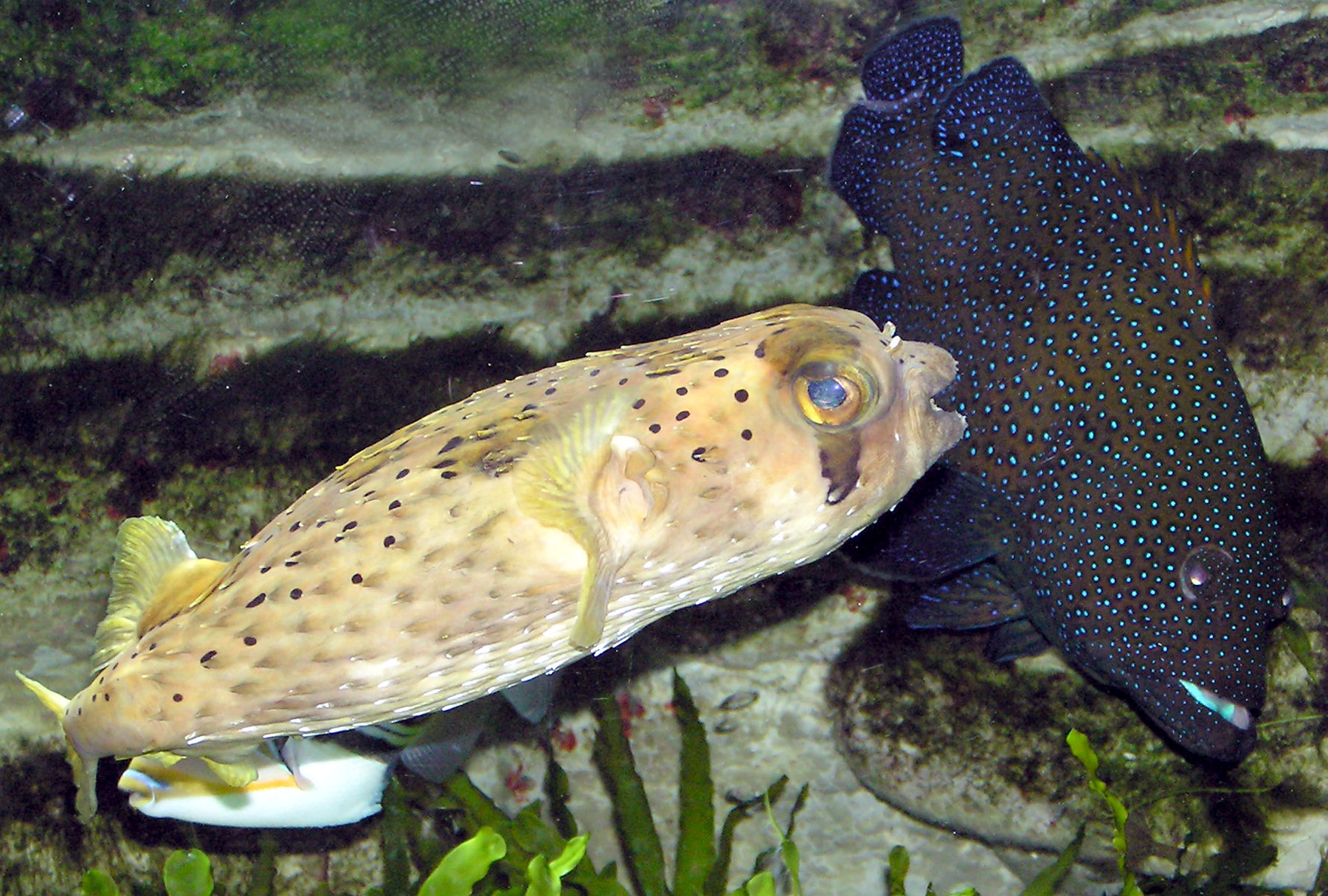
Long-spine porcupinefish, Diodon holocanthus: On the right is a blue-spotted grouper, Cephalopholis argus.

Tetraodontiforms have highly modified skeletons, with no nasal, parietal, infraorbital, or (usually) lower rib bones. The bones of the jaw are modified and fused into a sort of "beak"; visible sutures divide the beaks into "teeth". Counting these teeth-like bones is a way of distinguishing similar families, for example, the Tetraodontidae ("four-toothed"), Triodontidae ("three-toothed"), and Diodontidae ("two-toothed").

Their jaws are aided by powerful muscles, and many species also have pharyngeal teeth to further process prey items, because the Tetraodontiformes prey mostly on hard-shelled invertebrates, such as crustaceans and shellfish.

The Molidae are conspicuous even within this oddball order; they lack swim bladders and spines, and are propelled by their very tall dorsal and anal fins. The caudal peduncle is absent and the caudal fin is reduced to a stiff rudder-like structure. Molids are pelagic rather than reef-associated and feed on soft-bodied invertebrates, especially jellyfish.

== Families ==
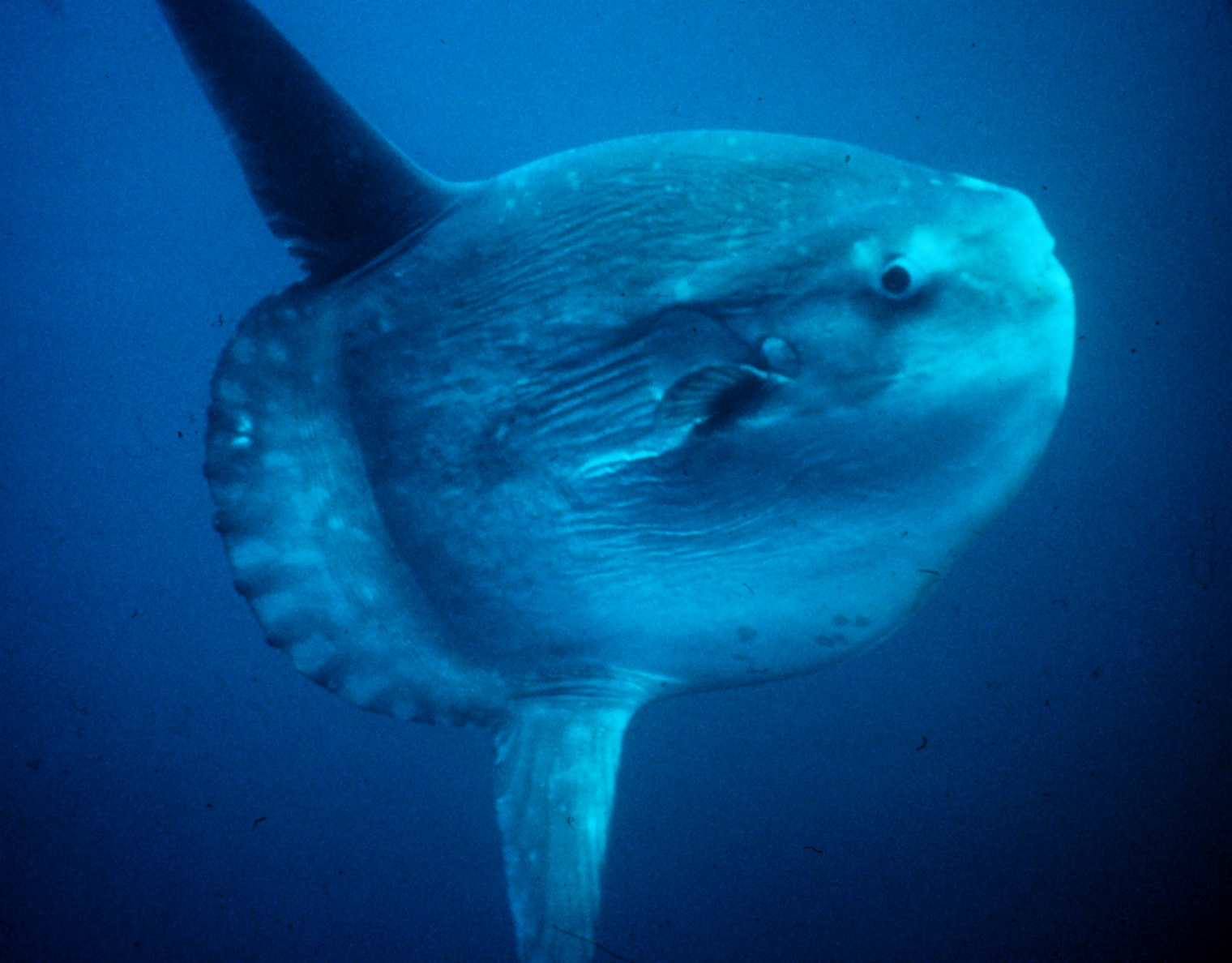
Ocean sunfish

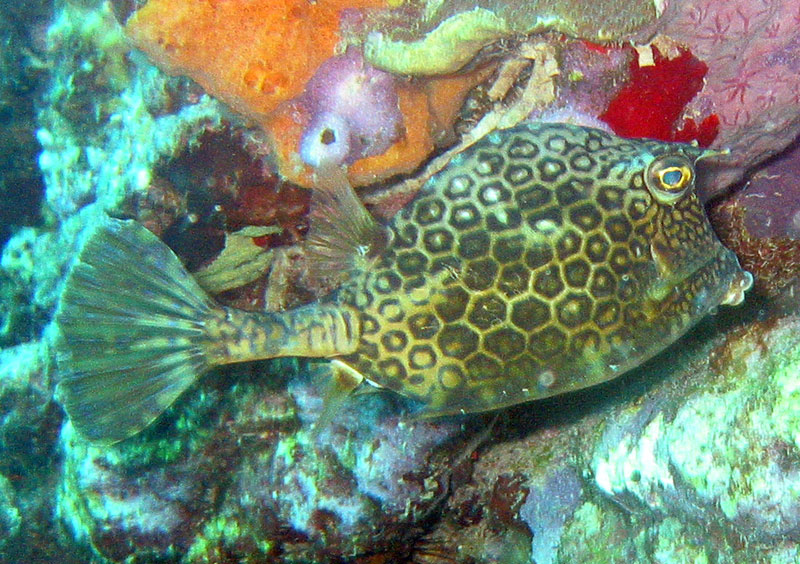
The honeycomb cowfish is part of the family Ostraciidae.

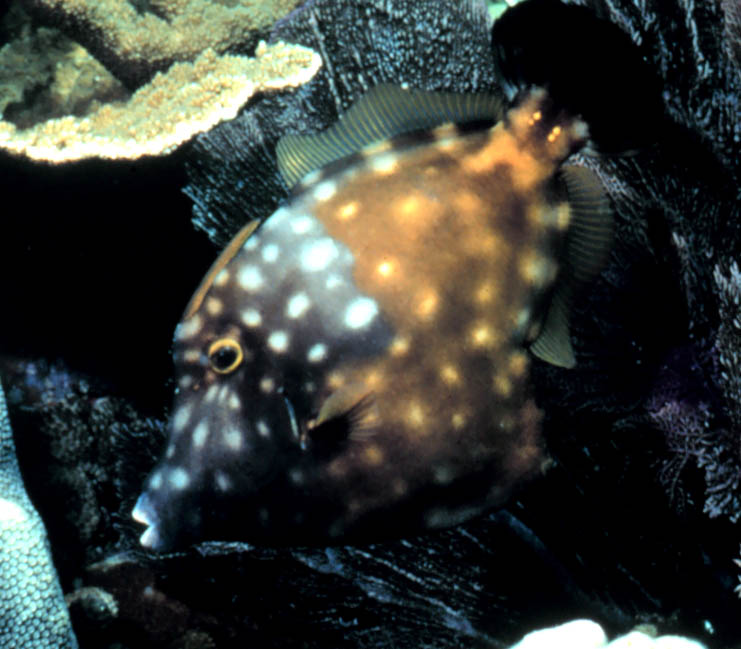
American whitespotted filefish Cantherhines macrocerus

The Tetraodontiformes contains the following suborders and families, based on Eschmeyer's Catalog of Fishes and Santini & Tyler (2003):

- Suborder Triacanthoidei Tyler, 1968
  - Family Triacanthodidae Gill, 1862 (spikefishes)
    - Subfamily Hollardiinae Tyler, 1968
    - Subfamily Triacanthodinae Gill, 1862
  - Family Triacanthidae Bleeker, 1859 (triplespines)
- Suborder Tetraodontoidei Berg, 1940
  - Superfamily Triodontoidea
    - Family Triodontidae Bleeker, 1859 (threetooth puffers)
  - Superfamily Moloidea
    - Family Molidae Bonaparte, 1835 (molas or ocean sunfishes)
  - Superfamily Tetraodontoidea
    - Family Diodontidae Bonaparte, 1835 (porcupinefishes and burrfishes)
    - Family Tetraodontidae Bonaparte, 1831 (pufferfishes)
- Suborder Balistoidei Rafinesque, 1810
  - Superfamily Balistoidea
    - Family Monacanthidae Nardo, 1843 (filefishes)
    - Family Balistidae Rafinesque, 1810 (triggerfishes)
  - Superfamily Ostracioidea
    - Family Aracanidae Hollard, 1860 (deepwater boxfishes)
    - Family Ostraciidae Rafinesque, 1810 (boxfishes)

=== Fossil taxa ===
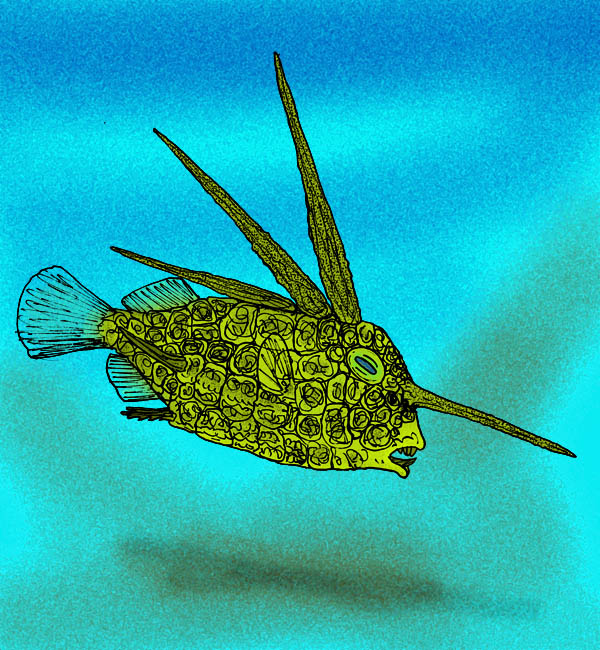
Eospinus (Early Eocene, Turkmenistan)

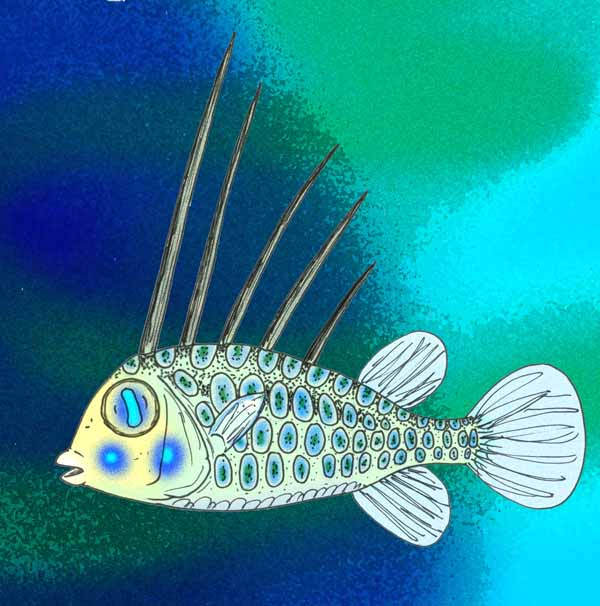
Spinacanthus (Early Eocene, Italy)

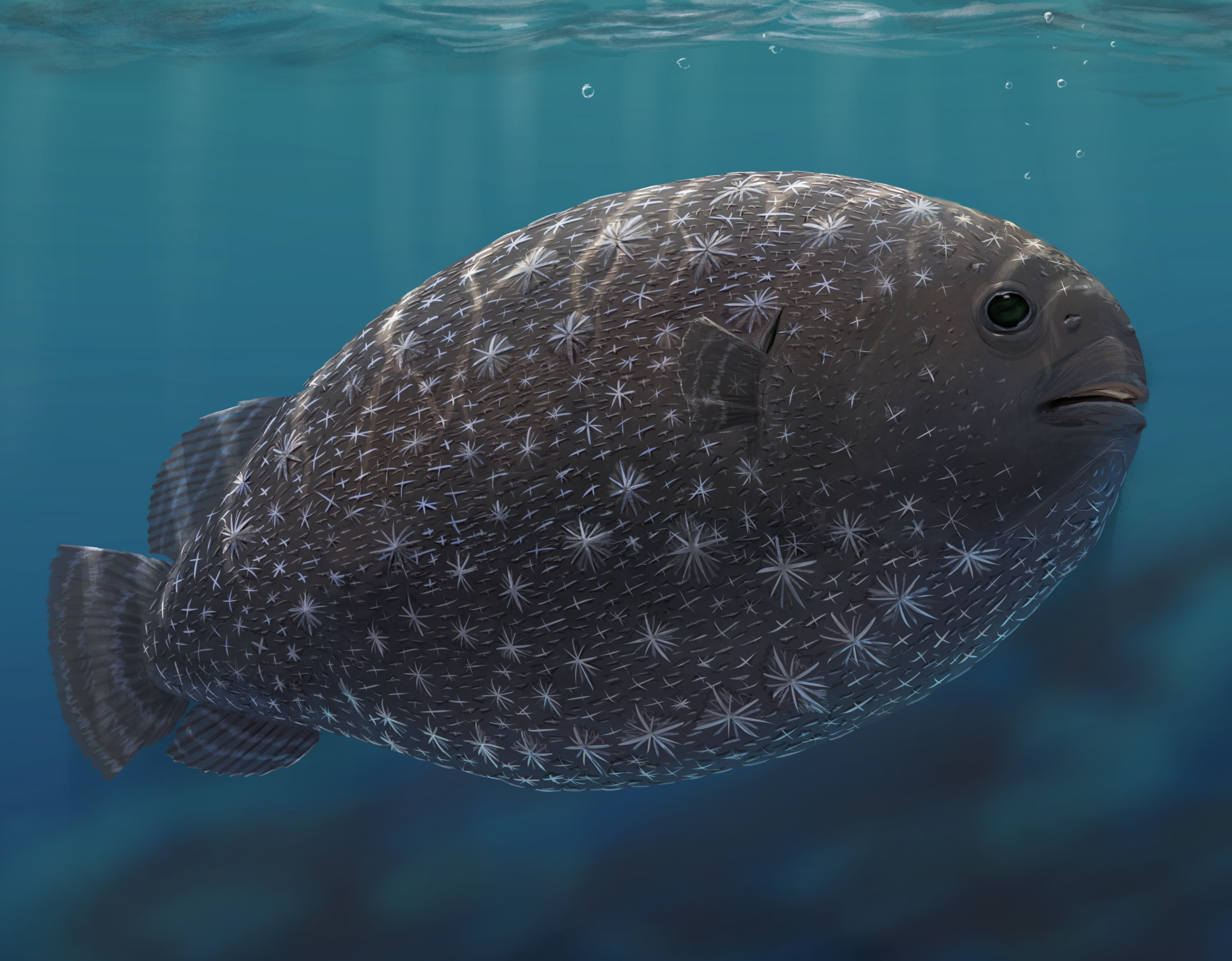
Iraniplectus (Early Oligocene, Iran)

Based on Santini & Tyler (2003):

- Suborder?†Plectocretacicoidei Tyler & Sorbini, 1996
  - Family?†Cretatriacanthidae Tyler & Sorbini, 1996
  - Family?†Plectocretacicidae Tyler & Sorbini, 1996
  - Family?†Protriacanthidae Tyler & Sorbini, 1996
- Suborder Balistoidei
  - Superfamily †Moclaybalistoidea
    - Family †Moclaybalistidae Santini & Tyler, 2003
  - Superfamily †Bolcabalistoidea
    - Family †Bolcabalistidae Santini & Tyler, 2003
    - Family †Spinacanthidae Santini & Tyler, 2003
- Suborder Tetraodontoidei
  - †Superfamily Eoplectoidea
    - Family †Eoplectidae Santini & Tyler, 2003
  - Genus †Ctenoplectus Close, Johanson, Tyler, Harrington & Friedman, 2016 (Early Eocene of England)
  - Genus †Iraniplectus Tyler, Mirzaie & Nazemi, 2006 (Early Oligocene of Iran)
  - Family †Avitoplectidae Bemis, Tyler, Bemis, Kumar, Rana & Smith, 2017
  - Family †Balkariidae Bannikov, Tyler, Arcila & Carnevale, 2016
  - Family †Zignoichthyidae Tyler & Sorbini, 1996

This cladogram of extant Tetraodontiformes is based on Santini et al., 2013.

This cladogram of extant Tetraodontiformes is based on Santini et al., 2013.

- Tetraodontiformes
  - - - Triodontidae (threetooth puffer)
    - - - - Aracanidae (deepwater boxfishes)
        - - Ostraciidae (boxfishes)
      - - - Triacanthidae (triplespines)
        - - Triacanthodidae (spikefishes)
  - - - - Balistidae (triggerfishes)
      - - Monacanthidae (filefishes)
    - - - Molidae (ocean sunfishes)
      - - - Diodontidae (porcupinefishes)
        - - Tetraodontidae (pufferfishes)
