= Lactophrys =

- Lactophrys trigonus

Scientific classification
- Kingdom: Animalia
- Phylum: Chordata
- Class: Actinopterygii
- Division: Teleostei
- Order: Tetraodontiformes
- Superfamily: Ostracioidea
- Family: Ostraciidae
- Genus: Lactophrys; Swainson, 1839

Type species
- Ostracion trigonus Linnaeus, 1758

Synonyms
- Chapinus D. S. Jordan & Evermann, 1896; Rhinesomus Swainson, 1839

Genus of fishes

Lactophrys is a genus of marine ray-finned fishes belonging to the family Ostraciidae, the boxfishes. The boxfishes in this genus are found in the western Atlantic Ocean and are known as trunkfishes.

== Taxonomy ==
Lactophrys was first proposed in 1839 as a subgenus of Tetrosomus by the British zoologist William Swainson. In 1865 Pieter Bleeker designated Ostracion trigonus as the type species of this taxon. O. trigonus has been first formally described by Carl Linnaeus in the 10th edition of Systema Naturae published in 1758, the type locality was mistakenly given as India when it is actually the Western Atlantic.

The 5th edition of Fishes of the World classifies this genus within the family Ostraciidae in the suborder Ostracioidea within the order Tetraodontiformes.

== Etymology ==
Lactophrys is a compound of lactaria, meaning a "milkcow", and ophrys, meaning "eyebrow", a reference to the spines above the eyes resembling the horns of a cow. Some fishes in this family are known as cowfishes.

== Species ==
Lactophrys contains 3 recognized species:

Scientific name	Common name	Adult	Juvenile
Lactophrys bicaudalis (Linnaeus, 1758)	Spotted trunkfish		
Lactophrys trigonus (Linnaeus, 1758)	Buffalo trunkfish		
Lactophrys triqueter (Linnaeus, 1758)	Smooth trunkfish		

== Description ==
Lactophrys trunkfishes have thick oblong bodies, most of which is encased in a carapace made up of thickened and enlarged hexagonal plate-like scales that are joined to each other. There are gaps in this carapace for the mouth, eyes, gill slits, fins and tail, although the bases of the dorsal and anal fins are completely encircled by the carapace. To the rear of the dorsal fin the carapace may be closed but if it is open then there is an isolated oval plate-like scale to the rear of the opening. This genus does not have spines at the eyes, but sometimes has a spine at each corner of the lower rear carapace and there are no spine-like scales on the caudal peduncle. They have small mouths located at the front of the snout, with fleshy lips and a row of no more than 15 moderately sized conivcal teeth in each jaw. The gill slits are short and oblique and are to the front of the bases of the pectoral fins. The dorsal and anal fins are at the back of the carapace and the caudal peduncle is thin and flexible. The caudal fin is fan shaped. The largest species in the genus is the buffalo trunkfish (L. trigonus) with a maximum published total length of 55 cm (22 in).

== Toxicity ==
Lactophrys trunkfishes, like other trunkfishes, secrete a colorless toxin from glands on its skin when touched. The toxin is only dangerous when ingested, so there is no immediate harm to divers. Predators however, as large as nurse sharks, can die as a result of eating a trunkfish.
