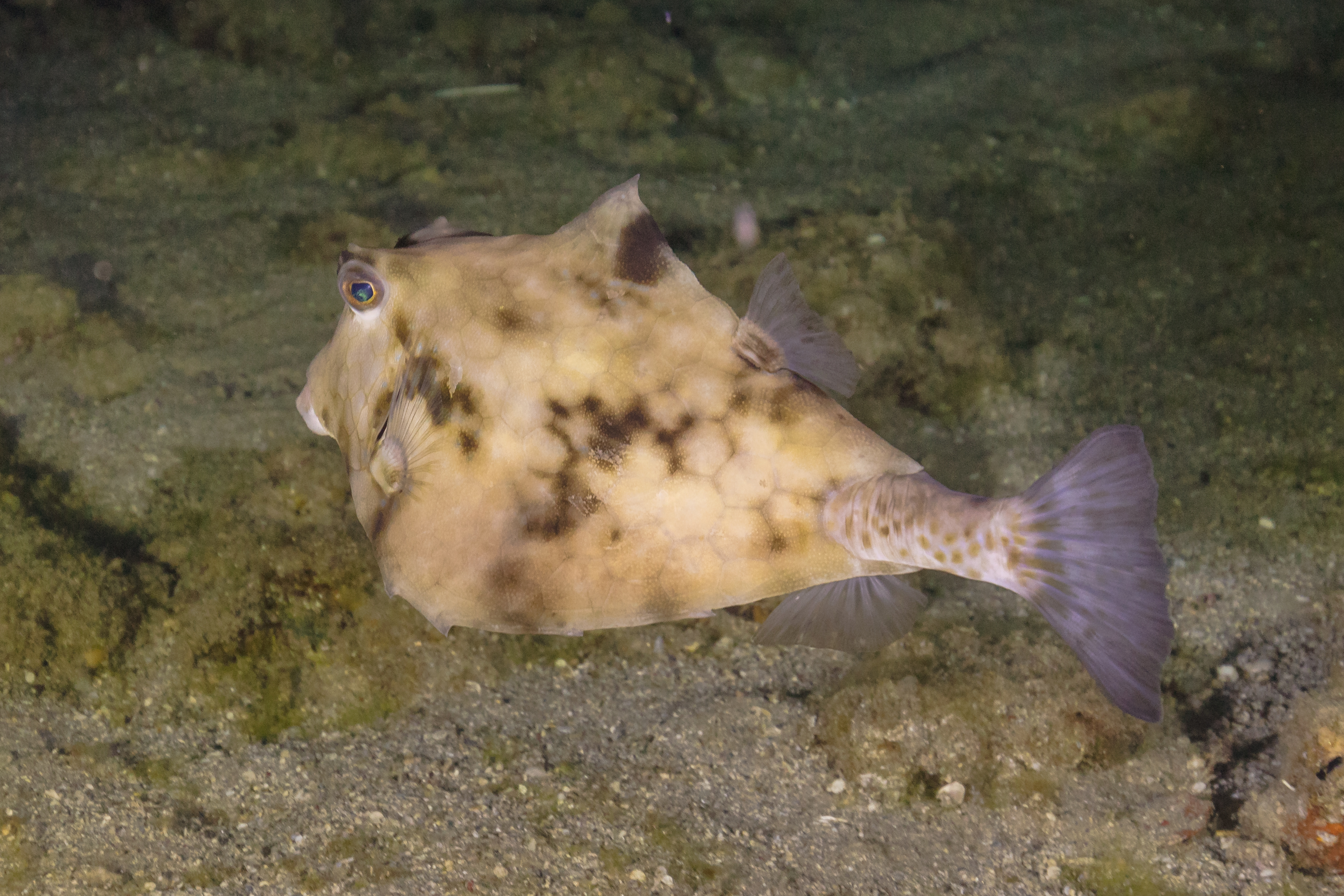

Conservation status
- Least Concern (IUCN 3.1)

Scientific classification
- Kingdom: Animalia
- Phylum: Chordata
- Class: Actinopterygii
- Division: Teleostei
- Order: Tetraodontiformes
- Family: Ostraciidae
- Genus: Tetrosomus
- Species: T. gibbosus

Binomial name
- Tetrosomus gibbosus (Linnaeus, 1758)

= Tetrosomus gibbosus =

Camel cowfish

Species of fish

Tetrosomus gibbosus, commonly called camel cowfish because of the hump on its dorsal keel, is one of 22 species in the boxfish family, Ostraciidae. It is a ray finned fish. Other common names include helmet cowfish, humpback turretfish and thornbacked boxfish. It is most closely related to T. reipublicae, the smallspine turretfish. T. gibbosus is a species of boxfish found in the wide Indo-West Pacific. It has been recorded since 1988 on rare occasions in the Levantine waters of the Mediterranean Sea, likely following entry via the Suez Canal. It is the first species from the family Ostraciidae to be found in the Mediterranean Sea.

It carries some value in the aquarium trade, but is difficult to keep.

== Description ==
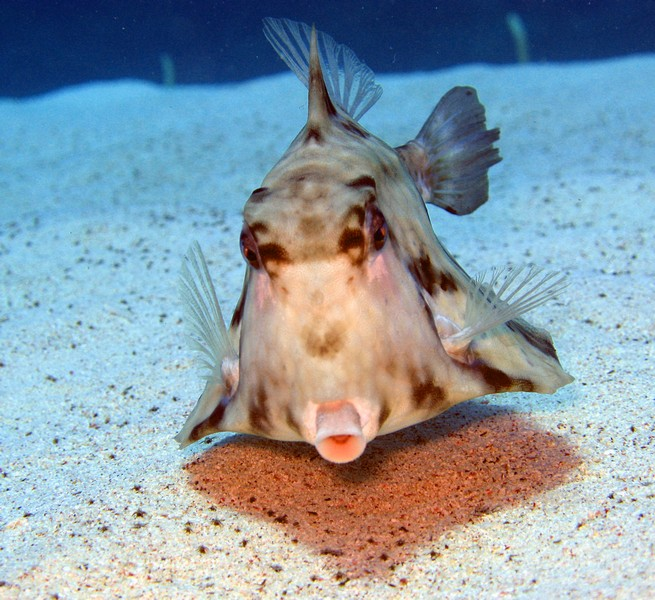

T. gibbosus is normally around 20 centimetres (7.9 in) long when it is fully grown, but can reach up to 30 centimetres (12 in) in length. Fish in the genus Tetrosomus are characterized by the presence of a carapace, a hard upper shell formed by thick scale plates. The body is completely encased in this bony shell, except for a few small openings such as the mouth, eyes, and gills. The mouth is small with fleshy lips and conical teeth usually numbering less than 15.

== Biology ==
T. gibbosus has poisonous flesh, organs, and spines, and is known to secrete poisonous mucus in defense or when it is disturbed. This poison can be fatal to humans or other marine organisms that come into contact with it. T. gibbosus is hermaphroditic; all individuals of this species are born female, but some may change into males as they grow. Juveniles live together in small schools, but individuals become solitary as they mature into adulthood. T. gibbosus is an omnivorous species, and its diet is known to include seaweeds, sponges, molluscs, worms, and crustaceans found on the bottom of its habitat.

== Distribution and habitat ==
T. gibbosus lives in shallow tropical waters or warm seas with muddy bottoms and can sometimes be seen near shallow seagrass beds. It is also found in coral reefs. It is considered an endangered species in the South China Sea.

== Lessepsian migration ==
A Lessepsian migration refers to the migration of a marine species from the Red Sea to the Mediterranean Sea, facilitated by the opening of the Suez Canal in 1869. A species is considered Lessepsian when it has completed this migration and established a population. T. gibbosus was first found in the Mediterranean Sea in 1988. Both the Red Sea and the Mediterranean Sea have similar salinity levels and temperature ranges, which allows for an easier transition between of these bodies of water. It is thought that Lessepsian species migrated due to changing climates, since the geographic land barrier was removed when the Suez Canal was completed. T. gibbosus is now considered an invasive species in the Mediterranean Sea, as this is not included in its native distribution. It is also considered an established species because it has established a growing population and has been found in multiple locations. It is the first species from the family Ostraciidae to be found in the Mediterranean Sea. Due to its inability to swim long distances, T. gibbosus likely took multiple generations to migrate from the Red Sea to the Mediterranean Sea; this is thought to have happened, in part, from northward currents moving eggs and larvae north towards the Mediterranean Sea.
