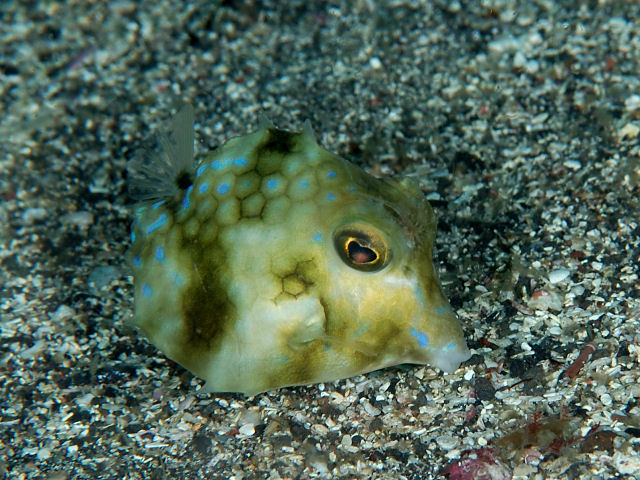

Scientific classification
- Kingdom: Animalia
- Phylum: Chordata
- Class: Actinopterygii
- Order: Tetraodontiformes
- Family: Ostraciidae
- Genus: Tetrosomus
- Species: T. concatenatus

Binomial name
- Tetrosomus concatenatus (Bloch, 1785)

= Tetrosomus concatenatus =

Species of fish

The triangular boxfish (Tetrosomus concatenatus) is a species of marine ray-finned fishes belonging to the family Ostraciidae, the boxfishes. The fishes in this genus are known as turretfishes, and they are found in the Indian and western Pacific Oceans.

== Taxonomy ==
Tetrosomus concatenatus was first formally described as Ostracion concatenatus in 1785 by the German physician and naturalist Marcus Elieser Bloch, with its type locality given as the Antilles. Although this species is accepted as valid by most authorities, there is some doubt as to its taxonomic validity, and some authorities, regard this taxon as a synonym of Lactophrys triqueter of the Western Atlantic. These authorities argue that specimens from the Indo-Pacific should be assigned to Tetrosomus reipublicae. The 5th edition of Fishes of the World classifies the genus Tetrosomus within the family Ostraciidae in the suborder Ostracioidea within the order Tetraodontiformes.

== Etymology ==
Tetrosomus concatenatus is a member of the genus Tetrosomus. This name is a combination of tetra, meaning "four", and somus, which means "body", a reference to the quadrangular shape of the body of this fish. The specific name concatenatus means "linked together" or "chained", an allusion to the chain-like markings on its body.

== Description ==
Tetrosomus concatenatus has a maximum published total length of 30 cm (12 in). It has 9 soft rays in both its dorsal and anal fins. Males have blue spots and a blue line that rapidly fade on capture.

== Distribution and habitat ==
This species is found in the Indo-West Pacific oceans. It ranges from East Africa to southern Japan and New Caledonia. This is a solitary species found in bays and estuaries with large isolated sponges, as well as in sea grass and seaweed beds in cosatal waters.
