= Spotted trunkfish =

Conservation status
- Least Concern (IUCN 3.1)

Scientific classification
- Kingdom: Animalia
- Phylum: Chordata
- Class: Actinopterygii
- Division: Teleostei
- Order: Tetraodontiformes
- Superfamily: Ostracioidea
- Family: Ostraciidae
- Genus: Lactophrys
- Species: L. bicaudalis

Binomial name
- Lactophrys bicaudalis (Linnaeus, 1758)

Synonyms
- Ostracion bicaudalis Linnaeus, 1758; Rhinesomus bicaudalis (Linnaeus, 1758)

Species of fish

The spotted trunkfish (Lactophrys bicaudalis) is a member of the family Ostraciidae. It lives in reefs throughout the Caribbean, as well as the southwestern Atlantic Ocean. It gets its name from the black spots on its whitish or yellow-golden body. In Caribbean countries, it is colloquially known as the boxfish, cow-fish or shellfish.

== Taxonomy ==
The spotted trunkfish was first formally described as Ostracion bicaudalis in 1758 by Carl Linnaeus in the 10th edition of Systema Naturae with its type locality given as "India".

The 5th edition of Fishes of the World classifies the genus Lactophrys within the family Ostraciidae in the suborder Ostracioidea within the order Tetraodontiformes.

== Etymology ==
The spotted trunkfish is a member of the genus Lactophrys, a name which is a compound of lactaria, meaning a "milkcow", and ophrys, meaning "eyebrow", a reference to the spines above the eyes resembling the horns of a cow. Some fishes in this family are known as cowfishes. The specific name, bicaudalis, means "two tailed", a reference to the two spines "below the tail", a mystery because this fish does not have any spines under its tail but there are two spines on either side of the anal fin.

== Distribution and habitat ==
The spotted trunkfish is found in the Caribbean Sea, the southern half of the Gulf of Mexico, Ascension Island and the northeastern coast of South America as far east as Brazil. It prefers clear water and is usually associated with coral reefs with fissures, holes and overhangs, at depths down to about 30 m (100 ft).

== Description ==
Members of this family are known as boxfishes because they have a hard outer covering consisting of hexagonal plate-like scales fused together into a solid, triangular or box-like carapace.

Juvenile

The eyes, snout, fins and tail protrude from this. The spotted trunkfish is basically white or yellowish with a regular pattern of numerous black spots on the body and tailfin. Just behind the eye, adult fish have a diagonal row of three white spots where black ones would have been expected. The snout is plain white, with no spines above the eye and a pair of sharp spines in front of the anal fin.

== Biology ==
Because of the heavy armoured scales, the spotted trunkfish is normally limited to slow movements, performed by rippling its dorsal and anal fins and gently beating its pectoral fins. If faster motion is required, it can additionally use the tail fin for propulsion. It is a benthic species, feeding on or near the seabed. Its diet includes crabs, shrimps, molluscs, sea urchins, starfish, brittle stars, sea cucumbers, tunicates and seagrasses.

=== Toxicity ===
The spotted trunkfish, like all trunkfish of the genus Lactophrys, secretes a colourless toxin from glands on its skin when touched. The toxin is only dangerous when ingested, so there is no immediate harm to divers. Predators as large as nurse sharks can die from eating a trunkfish.

== Gallery ==

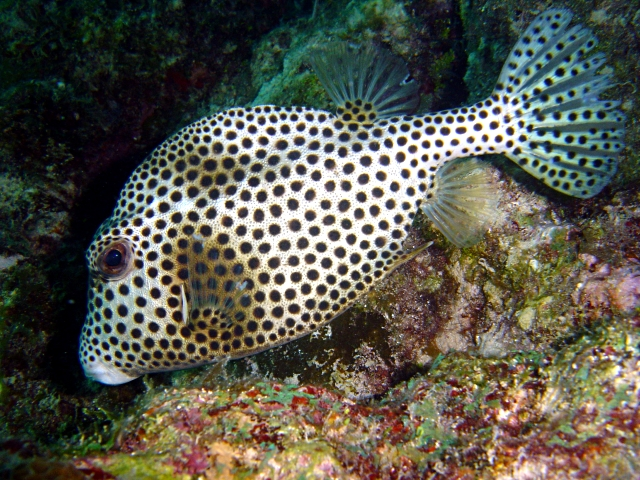
