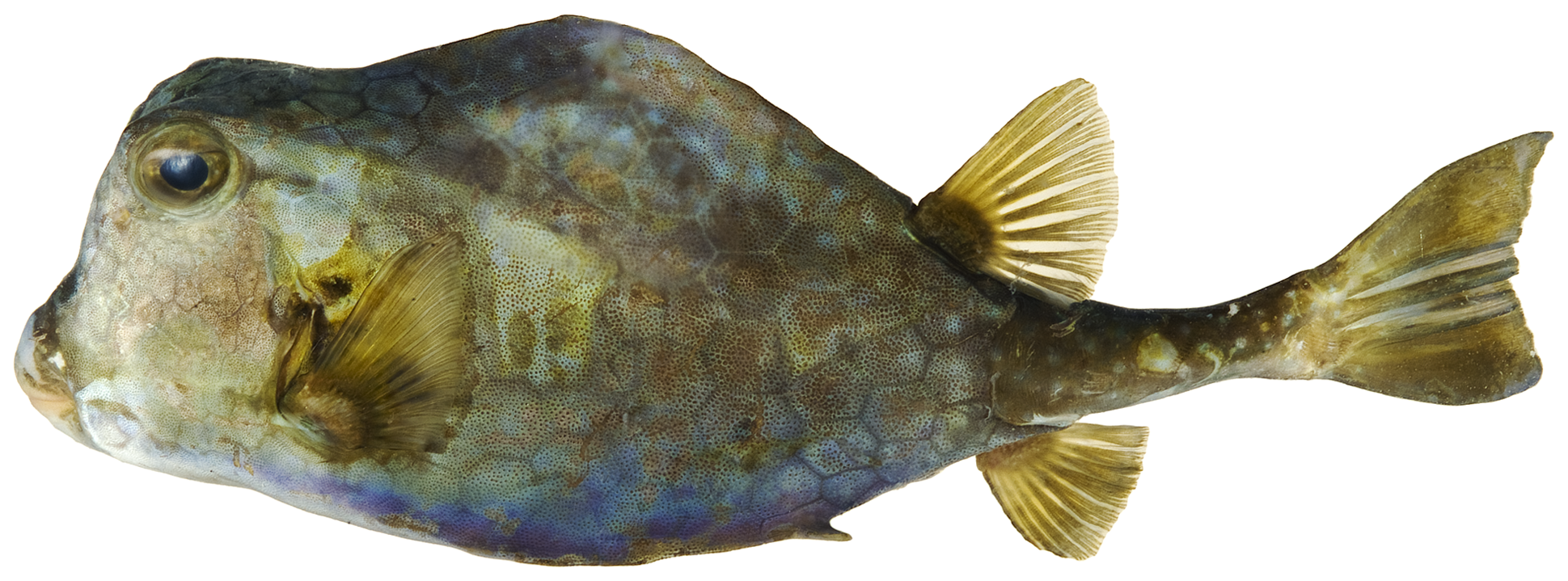

Conservation status
- Least Concern (IUCN 3.1)

Scientific classification
- Kingdom: Animalia
- Phylum: Chordata
- Class: Actinopterygii
- Division: Teleostei
- Order: Tetraodontiformes
- Superfamily: Ostracioidea
- Family: Ostraciidae
- Genus: Lactophrys
- Species: L. trigonus

Binomial name
- Lactophrys trigonus (Linnaeus, 1758)

Synonyms
- List: Ostracion trigonus Linnaeus, 1758; Ostracion undulatus Poey, 1868; Ostracium expansum Cope, 1871; Ostracion expansum Cope, 1871

= Lactophrys trigonus =

Species of fish

Lactophrys trigonus, the buffalo trunkfish or trunkfish, is a species of marine ray-finned fish belonging to the family Ostraciidae, the boxfishes. The buffalo trunkfish is found in the Western Atlantic Ocean.

== Taxonomy ==
Lactophrys trigonus was first formally described as Ostracion trigonus in 1758 by Carl Linnaeus in the 10th edition of Systema Naturae with its type locality given as the Western Atlantic. In 1839 William Swainson proposed a new subgenus of Ostracion he called Lactophrys and in 1865 Pieter Bleeker designated this species, O. trigonus as the type species of Lactophrys.

The 5th edition of Fishes of the World classifies the genus Lactophrys within the family Ostraciidae in the suborder Ostracioidea within the order Tetraodontiformes.

== Etymology ==
Lactophrys trigonus is a member of the genus Lactophrys, a name which is a compound of lactaria, meaning a "milkcow", and ophrys, meaning "eyebrow", a reference to the spines above the eyes resembling the horns of a cow. Some fishes in this family are known as cowfishes. The specific name, trigonus, means "three angles", a reference to this fish's triangular body when viewed head on.

== Distribution and habitat ==
The species is native to the Western Atlantic from Canada to Brazil, including the Gulf of Mexico, Bermuda and the Caribbean. Records from the Mediterranean still lack verification. It inhabits areas with coral rubble, seagrass beds and offshore reefs, preferring depths above 50 m (160 ft).

== Description ==
In captivity

The trunkfish has small diffuse white spots. Two areas, located on the pectoral region and halfway between gills and posterior end of carapace, contain dark-edged hexagonal plates that together form chain-like markings. It can reach a length of 30–50 cm and weigh up to 3.3 kg.

== Ecology ==
Boxfish are benthic feeders and will forage on seagrasses, crustaceans, mollusks, worms, tunicates and a variety of small benthic invertebrates. They are a popular food throughout the Caribbean, and a minor species in the aquarium trade.

== Gallery ==
Juveniles
