= Tetrosomus =

- Tetrosomus gibbosus

Scientific classification
- Kingdom: Animalia
- Phylum: Chordata
- Class: Actinopterygii
- Division: Teleostei
- Order: Tetraodontiformes
- Family: Ostraciidae
- Genus: Tetrosomus; Swainson, 1839

Type species
- Ostracion turritus Forsskål, 1775

Synonyms
- Triorus D. S. Jordan & C. L. Hubbs, 1925

Genus of fishes

Tetrosomus is a genus of marine ray-finned fishes belonging to the family Ostraciidae, the boxfishes. The fishes in this genus are known as turretfishes and they are found in the Indian and western Pacific Oceans.

== Taxonomy ==
Tetrosomus was first proposed as a monospecific genus in 1839 by William Swainson with Ostracion turritus as its type species by monotypy. O. turritus was first formally described in 1775 by the Finland-born Swedish explorer, orientalist, naturalist Peter Forsskål with its type locality given as the Red Sea off Mokha in Yemen. O. turritus is now considered to be a junior synonym of O. gibbosus which had been described by Carl Linnaeus in the 10th edition of Systema Naturae published in 1758. The 5th edition of Fishes of the World classifies this genus within the family Ostraciidae in the suborder Ostracioidea within the order Tetraodontiformes.

== Etymology ==
Tetrosomus is a combination of tetra, meaning "four", and somus, which means "body", a reference to the quadrangular shape of the body of this fish.

== Species ==
Tetrosomus currently contains the following recognised species:

- Tetrosomus concatenatus (Bloch, 1785) (Triangular boxfish)
- Tetrosomus gibbosus (Linnaeus, 1758) (Camel cowfish)
- Tetrosomus reipublicae (Whitley, 1930) (Smallspine turretfish)
- Tetrosomus stellifer (Bloch & Schneider, 1801)

FishBase and Eschmeyer's Catalog of Fishes list the above four species within the genus but other authorities only recognise T. gibbosus and T. reipublicae as valid species, with T. concatenatus treated as a synonym of T. reipublicae. while others recognise T. concatenatus but not T. stellifer.: T. conctenatus has been treated as a synonym of Lactophrys triqueter by some authorities.

== Characteristics ==
Tetrosomus turretfishes are characterised by having a carapce with a triangular cross section and which is closed behind the dorsal and anal fins. The ridges along the back and along the lower flank are sharp. The dorsal fin is not above the anal fin and is set before it. The species in this genus have a maximum published total length of 30 cm (12 in).

== Distribution and habitat ==
Tetrosomus turretfishes are found in the Indian and Western Pacific Oceans in areas of soft substrates.
