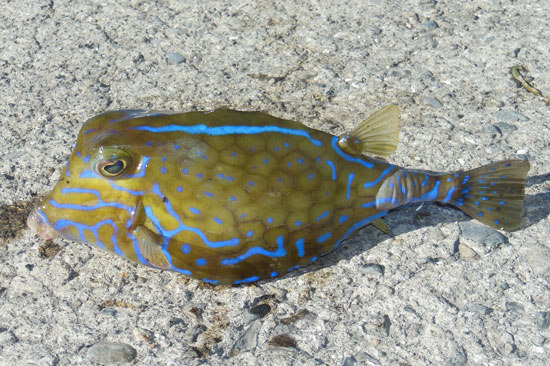

Scientific classification
- Kingdom: Animalia
- Phylum: Chordata
- Class: Actinopterygii
- Order: Tetraodontiformes
- Family: Ostraciidae
- Genus: Tetrosomus
- Species: T. reipublicae

Binomial name
- Tetrosomus reipublicae (Whitley, 1930)

Synonyms
- Triorus reipublicae Whitley, 1930; Lactophrys reipublicae Ogilby, 1913; Rhinesomus reipublicae (Ogilby, 1913); Tetrosomus reipublicae (Ogilby, 1913)

= Smallspine turretfish =

Species of fish

The smallspine turretfish (Tetrosomus reipublicae) is a species of marine ray-finned fish belonging to the family Ostraciidae, the boxfishes. This species is found in the Indo-Pacific region.

== Taxonomy ==
The smallspine turretfisj was first formally described as Triorus reipublicae in 1930 by the Australian ichthyologist Gilbert Percy Whitley with its type locality given as Moreton Bay in Queensland. Whitley based his desruiption on Based on Lactophrys reipublicae described by James Douglas Ogilby in 1913, which is a nomen nudum, plus additional material. the taxon Tetrosomus concatenatus is regarded by some authorities as a synonym of the Western Atlantic Lactophrys triqueter, and that Indo-Pacific specimens assigned to T. concatenatus are actually this species. The 5th edition of Fishes of the World classifies the genus Tetrosomus within the family Ostraciidae in the suborder Ostracioidea within the order Tetraodontiformes.

== Etymology ==
The smallspine turretfish is a member of the genus Tetrosomus, this name being is a combination of tetra, meaning "four", and somus, which means "body", a reference to the quadrangular shape of the body of this fish. The specific name reipublicae means "commonwealth", an allusion to the Commonwealth of Australia, a name invented by Ogilby for the Australian populations of L. concatenatus.

== Description ==
The smallspine turretfish is a greenish to brown or pinkish boxfish, the juveniles are marked with dark spots> As they grow the numbers of blue spots and lines increases. There are two spines on the dorsal ridge running along the back. The carapace has a triangular cross-section. The mouth is small and there is a pointed snout. The dorsal fin is located further forward in comparison to the anal fin. This species has a maximum published total length of 30 cm (12 in).

== Distribution and habitat ==
The smallspine turretfish occurs in the tropical, Indo-west Pacific, ranging from East Africa through Indonesia north to southern Japan and south to Australia. In Australia it ranges from Albany to northeast of the Monte Bello Islands, Western Australia and north Queensland as far south as Tathra, New South Wales, as well as in the Lord Howe Province in the Tasman Sea. This species occurs in inshore reefs and seagrass meadows.
