= Smooth trunkfish =

- At Cozumel

Conservation status
- Least Concern (IUCN 3.1)

Scientific classification
- Kingdom: Animalia
- Phylum: Chordata
- Class: Actinopterygii
- Division: Teleostei
- Order: Tetraodontiformes
- Superfamily: Ostracioidea
- Family: Ostraciidae
- Genus: Lactophrys
- Species: L. triqueter

Binomial name
- Lactophrys triqueter (Linnaeus, 1758)

Synonyms
- Ostracion triqueter Linnaeus, 1758; Rhinesomus triqueter (Linnaeus, 1758)

Species of fish

The smooth trunkfish (Lactophrys triqueter) is a species of marine ray-finned fish in the boxfish family Ostraciidae. It is found in the western Atlantic Ocean.

== Taxonomy ==
The smooth trunkfish was first formally described as Ostracion triqueter in 1758 by Carl Linnaeus in the 10th edition of Systema Naturae with its type locality given as "India", in error for the Western Atlantic.

== Etymology ==
The smooth trunkfish is a member of the genus Lactophrys, a compound of lactaria, meaning "milkcow", and ophrys, meaning "eyebrow", a reference to the spines above the eyes resembling the horns of a cow (this resemblnce is also why some fishes in this family are known commonly as cowfish). The specific name, triqueter, means "three angled", a reference to this fish's triangular body when viewed head on.

== Distribution ==
The smooth trunkfish is found down to a depth of about 50 m (164 ft) on coral reefs and over sandy seabeds in the Caribbean Sea, Gulf of Mexico and the western Atlantic Ocean. The range extends from Canada and the Gulf of Maine southwards to Brazil.

== Description ==
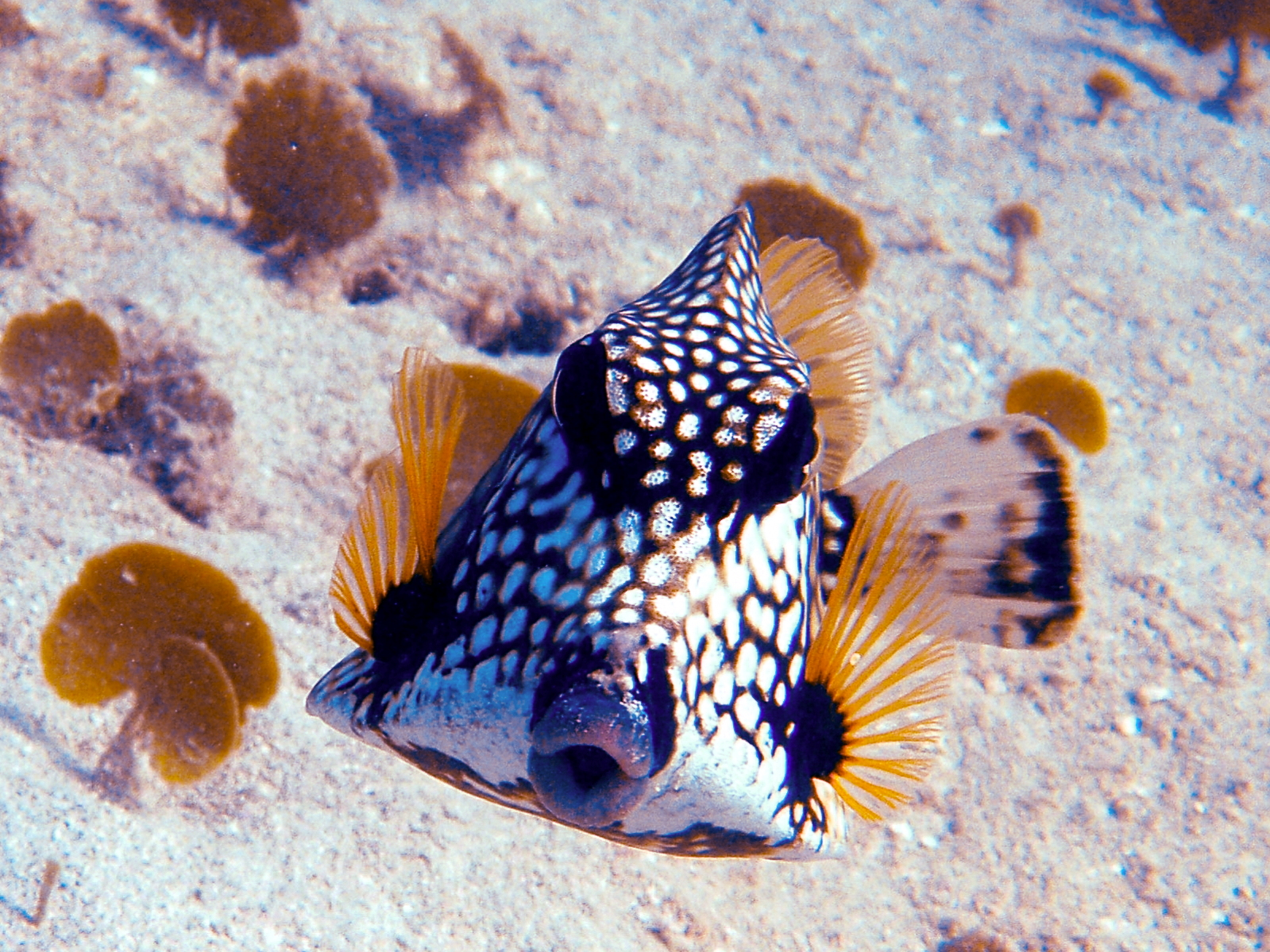
Front view

The smooth trunkfish has an angular body sheathed in plate-like scales, growing to a maximum length of 47 cm (19 in), though 20 cm (8 in) is a more normal size. The body is enclosed in a bony carapace and, when viewed from the front, is triangular in shape with a narrow top and wide base. The fish has a pointed snout with protuberant lips encircling a small mouth. The tail is shaped like a brush. The general background colour is dark with a pattern of small white spots, often in hexagonal groups giving a honeycomb-like appearance in the middle area of the body. The tip of the snout and the area round the pectoral fins are dark with few spots, and the eyes are black. The fins are usually yellowish, with a dark base and tip. They have only soft rays with no spines.

The juveniles have dark-colored bodies covered in large yellow spots. As they get older, they develop a pale area where the honeycomb markings will later appear.

Growth series: from youngest juvenile (left) to adult (right)

== Biology ==
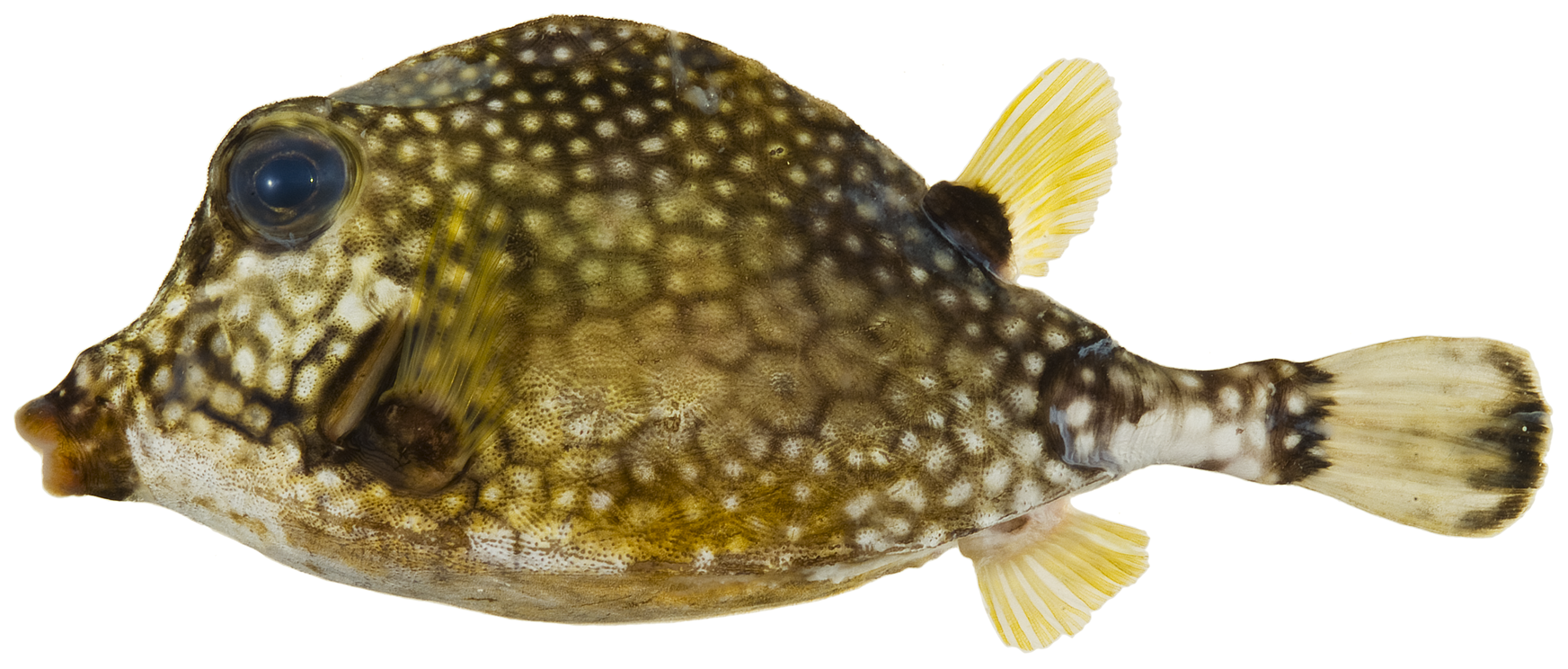
11 cm SL Caribbean specimen

The smooth trunkfish is normally solitary but sometimes moves around in small groups. It uses its protuberant lips to expel a jet of water in order to disturb the sandy seabed and reveal any shallowly buried benthic invertebrates, which it then feeds on. Molluscs, polychaete worms, acorn worms, peanut worms, small crustaceans, sponges and tunicates are among the invertebrates that this fish consumes.

== Human interactions ==
In some regions, the smooth trunkfish is caught for human consumption. It is also sometimes kept in reef aquaria. Caution needs to be used, however, as it is capable of producing a toxic substance, ostracitoxin, in mucous secretions from the skin. When the fish is stressed, this is released into the water, and there have been examples of aquarium systems being poisoned by this, resulting in the loss of all other animal inhabitants.

== Gallery ==
Foraging

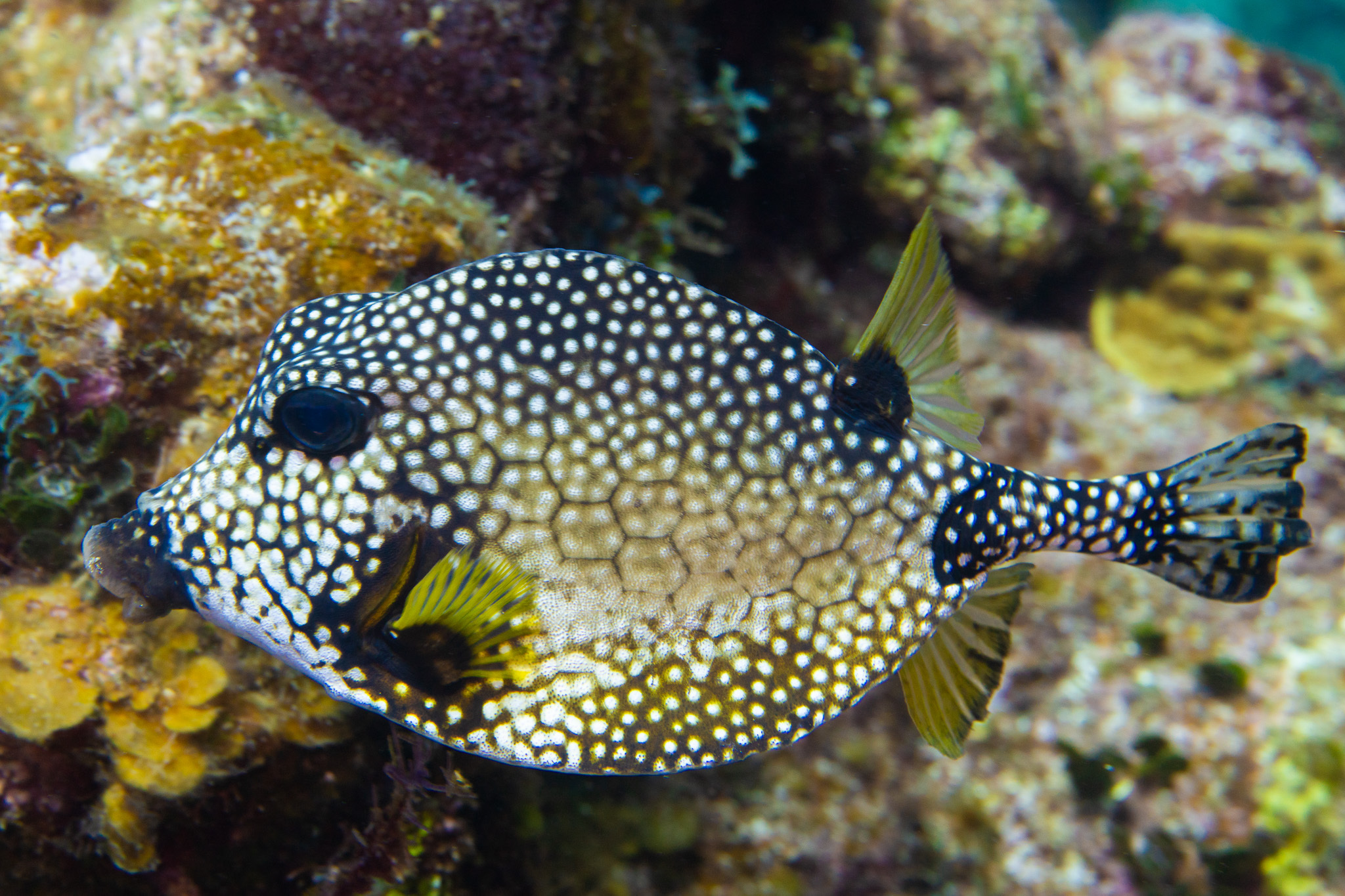

In captivity
