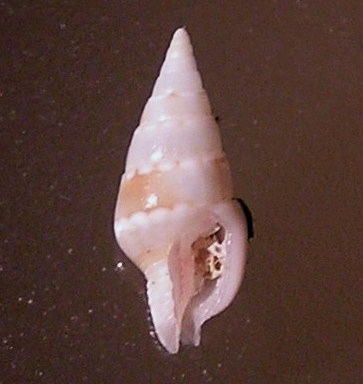
- Mitrella albuginosa

Scientific classification
- Kingdom: Animalia
- Phylum: Mollusca
- Class: Gastropoda
- Subclass: Caenogastropoda
- Order: Neogastropoda
- Superfamily: Buccinoidea
- Family: Columbellidae
- Genus: Mitrella; Risso, 1826

Type species
- Mitrella flaminea Risso, A., 1826

Species
- See text

Synonyms
- List: † Atilia (Iba) Hornung, 1920; † Bastropia Palmer, 1937; †Columbella (Angulatomitrella) Sacco, 1890; †Columbella (Arcuatomitrella) Sacco, 1890; Columbella (Columbellopsis) Bucquoy, Dautzenberg & Dollfus, 1882; Columbella (Mitrella) Risso, 1826; Columbellopsis Bucquoy, Dautzenberg & Dollfus, 1882; Dentimitrella Ludbrook, 1958; † Mitrella (Bastropia) Palmer, 1937; Mitrella (Columbellopsis) Bucquoy, Dautzenberg & Dollfus, 1882; Mitrella (Dentimitrella) Ludbrook, 1958; † Mitrella (Longitrella) Olsson, 1942; Mitrella (Mitrella) Risso, 1826; † Mitrella (Pseudopisania) Cossmann, 1897; Mitrella (Striomitrella) U. S. Grant & Gale, 1931; Mitrella (Pseudopisania) Cossmann, 1897; Paratilia Thiele, 1924; Pyrene (Mitrella) Risso, 1826; Pyrene (Paratilia) Thiele, 1924

= Mitrella (gastropod) =

Genus of gastropods

Mitrella is a genus of small sea snails, marine gastropod mollusks in the family Columbellidae, the dove shells or dove snails.

== Species ==
The following species are recognised in the genus Mitrella:

- †Mitrella acuminata (Sacco, 1890)
- Mitrella admodumparva Pelorce, 2020
- Mitrella aemulata Rolán, 2005
- Mitrella aesopiformis K. Monsecour & D. Monsecour, 2016
- Mitrella africana Rolán, 2005
- Mitrella agatha (Melvill, 1904)
- Mitrella albobrunnea Bozzetti, 2020
- Mitrella albocaudata (E. A. Smith, 1884)
- Mitrella albofulvata Drivas & M. Jay, 1990
- Mitrella albomaculata Bozzetti, 2019
- Mitrella albuginosa (Reeve, 1859)
- Mitrella alizonae (Melvill & Standen, 1901)
- Mitrella alofa (Hedley, 1899)
- Mitrella alvarezi Rolán & Luque, 2002
- Mitrella anachisoides Nomura & Nüno, 1940
- †Mitrella anchuela Keen 1943
- †Mitrella angusta (Deshayes, 1835)
- Mitrella angustalineata K. Monsecour & D. Monsecour, 2016
- Mitrella annae Cecalupo, 2021
- Mitrella annobonensis Rolán, 2005
- Mitrella antares Costa & de Souza, 2001
- Mitrella antelmei (Viader, 1938)
- Mitrella apicata (E. A. Smith, 1899)
- †Mitrella aquitanica (Peyrot, 1925)
- Mitrella aranciicoloris K. Monsecour & D. Monsecour, 2011
- Mitrella arcta K. Monsecour & D. Monsecour, 2016
- Mitrella ardovinii Cecalupo, 2021
- Mitrella astolensis (Melvill & Standen, 1901)
- Mitrella aurantiaca (Dall, 1871)
- Mitrella austrina (Gaskoin, 1852)
- Mitrella avena (Reeve, 1859)
- Mitrella azima (Duclos, 1846)
- Mitrella azpilicuetai Rolán, 2004
- Mitrella baccata (Gaskoin, 1852)
- Mitrella baculus (Reeve, 1859)
- †Mitrella bastropensis (G. D. Harris, 1895)
- Mitrella bellonae K. Monsecour & D. Monsecour, 2016
- Mitrella bellula Bozzetti, 2019
- †Mitrella biarata (Cossmann, 1886)
- Mitrella bicincta (A. Gould, 1860)
- Mitrella bicinctella Yokoyama, 1928
- †Mitrella bittneri (R. Hoernes & Auinger, 1880)
- Mitrella blanda (G. B. Sowerby I, 1844)
- Mitrella boucheti Drivas & M. Jay, 1990
- Mitrella bouteti K. Monsecour & D. Monsecour, 2018
- Mitrella broderipii (G. B. Sowerby I, 1844)
- Mitrella brookei (Reeve, 1859)
- Mitrella bruggeni van Aartsen, Menkhorst & Gittenberger, 1984
- Mitrella brugneauxae Pelorce, 2020
- Mitrella brunnealineata K. Monsecour & D. Monsecour, 2011
- Mitrella buccinoides (G. B. Sowerby I, 1832)
- †Mitrella buccinopsis Lozouet, 1999
- Mitrella burchardti (Dunker, 1877)
- Mitrella caboblanquensis Arias Ávila, 2021
- Mitrella cabofrioensis Costa & de Souza, 2001
- Mitrella canariensis (d'Orbigny, 1840)
- †Mitrella cantaurana Gibson-Smith 1974
- Mitrella cartwrighti (Melvill, 1897)
- Mitrella caulerpae Keen, 1971
- Mitrella chantalae Bozzetti, 2006
- Mitrella charcoti K. Monsecour & D. Monsecour, 2016
- Mitrella chinoi K. Monsecour & Dekkers, 2013
- Mitrella clementensis (Bartsch, 1927)
- Mitrella coccinea (R. A. Philippi, 1836)
- †Mitrella complanata (Sacco, 1890)
- Mitrella condei Rolán, 2005
- Mitrella confusa K. Monsecour & Dekkers, 2013
- †Mitrella convexa (Friedberg, 1911)
- Mitrella corbariae Pelorce, 2020
- Mitrella cruenta Pelorce, 2020
- Mitrella cuspidata Lussi, 2009
- Mitrella cyanae K. Monsecour & D. Monsecour, 2016
- †Mitrella dacica Harzhauser & Landau, 2021
- Mitrella dartevelli (Knudsen, 1956)
- Mitrella debitusae K. Monsecour & D. Monsecour, 2016
- †Mitrella debooyi Maury 1917
- Mitrella deforgesi K. Monsecour & D. Monsecour, 2016
- Mitrella delannoyei (Pelorce, 2013)
- Mitrella delicata (Reeve, 1859)
- †Mitrella demaintenonae Harzhauser & Landau, 2021
- Mitrella densilineata (P. P. Carpenter, 1864)
- Mitrella denticulata (Duclos, 1840)
- Mitrella desmia (Hervier, 1900)
- Mitrella dichroa (G. B. Sowerby I, 1844)
- Mitrella dictua (Tenison Woods, 1879)
- Mitrella dorma F. Baker, G. D. Hanna & A. M. Strong, 1938
- Mitrella dupreezae Lussi, 2002
- Mitrella ebisco K. Monsecour & D. Monsecour, 2016
- †Mitrella edensis Richards and Harbison 1947
- Mitrella elegans (Dall, 1871)
- Mitrella elegantia Pelorce, 2020
- Mitrella elianeae Bozzetti, 2006
- †Mitrella elongatissima Harzhauser & Landau, 2021
- Mitrella eminens (Thiele, 1925)
- †Mitrella epacta Woodring 1964
- Mitrella erythraeensis (Sturany, 1900)
- †Mitrella erythrostoma (Bellardi, 1848)
- Mitrella essingtonensis (Reeve, 1859)
- Mitrella euterpe (Melvill, 1893)
- Mitrella exilis Bozzetti, 2019
- Mitrella expolita K. Monsecour & D. Monsecour, 2016
- †Mitrella fallax (R. Hoernes & Auinger, 1880)
- Mitrella fimbriata Pelorce & Boyer, 2005
- Mitrella fineti Poppe & Tagaro, 2010
- Mitrella floccata (Reeve, 1859)
- Mitrella fortuita K. Monsecour & D. Monsecour, 2016
- Mitrella franklinensis (Gatliff & Gabriel, 1910)
- †Mitrella fufana P. J. Fischer, 1927
- Mitrella fuscolineata Pelorce, 2020
- Mitrella gausapata (A. Gould, 1850)
- Mitrella gervillii (Payraudeau, 1826)
- †Mitrella girondica (Peyrot, 1925)
- Mitrella glycochroma Pelorce, 2020
- †Mitrella gonzabuensis MacNeil, 1961
- Mitrella gourgueti K. Monsecour & D. Monsecour, 2015
- Mitrella gracilis K. Monsecour & D. Monsecour, 2016
- Mitrella graevei Kilburn, 1977
- Mitrella granti H. N. Lowe, 1935
- Mitrella guanahaniensis Faber, 2004
- Mitrella guerreiroi Rolán, 2002
- Mitrella guttata (G. B. Sowerby I, 1832)
- Mitrella harfordi A. M. Strong & Hertlein, 1937
- Mitrella harryleei K. Monsecour & Raines, 2024
- Mitrella hastata Lussi, 2002
- Mitrella hayesi Lussi, 2002
- †Mitrella hayesorum Duerr 2008
- Mitrella hernandezi Boyer & Rolán, 2005
- Mitrella herosae K. Monsecour & D. Monsecour, 2016
- †Mitrella hilberi (Cossmann, 1901)
- Mitrella humboldti Arias Ávila, 2021
- Mitrella hypodra (Dall, 1916)
- Mitrella impolita (G. B. Sowerby I, 1844)
- Mitrella inaccessa K. Monsecour & D. Monsecour, 2016
- Mitrella inaequalis K. Monsecour & D. Monsecour, 2016
- Mitrella incisa Bozzetti, 2019
- †Mitrella inconspicua P. Marshall, 1918
- Mitrella indifferens (Thiele, 1925)
- Mitrella inesitae Rolán, 2005
- Mitrella inflata Pelorce & Boyer, 2005
- Mitrella innocens (Thiele, 1925)
- Mitrella intermissalineata K. Monsecour & D. Monsecour, 2016
- Mitrella intexta (Gaskoin, 1852)
- Mitrella jacoi Lussi, 2002
- Mitrella jahami K. Monsecour & D. Monsecour, 2011
- Mitrella jayi K. Monsecour & D. Monsecour, 2016
- Mitrella joseantonioi (Espinosa & Ortea, 2014)
- Mitrella kevini Pelorce, 2017
- Mitrella laevior K. Monsecour & D. Monsecour, 2016
- Mitrella lalage Pilsbry & H. N. Lowe, 1932
- Mitrella leeannae K. Monsecour & Swinnen, 2019
- Mitrella legrandi (Tenison Woods, 1876)
- Mitrella leucostoma (Gaskoin, 1852)
- Mitrella lignaria (Odhner, 1922)
- †Mitrella limonensis Gabb 1881
- Mitrella lincolnensis (Reeve, 1859)
- Mitrella lischkei (E. A. Smith, 1879)
- †Mitrella llajasensis Squires, 2015
- Mitrella loisae Pitt & Kohl, 1979
- Mitrella longissima K. Monsecour & D. Monsecour, 2007
- Mitrella lorenzi K. Monsecour & D. Monsecour, 2014
- Mitrella loyaltyensis (Hervier, 1900)
- Mitrella macandrewi (G. B. Sowerby III, 1905)
- †Mitrella mackayi (Suter, 1917)
- Mitrella maculafasciata K. Monsecour & D. Monsecour, 2016
- Mitrella maestratii K. Monsecour & D. Monsecour, 2011
- †Mitrella mantjeuriensis Oostingh, 1940
- Mitrella martensi (Lischke, 1871)
- Mitrella melvilli (Knudsen, 1956)
- Mitrella menkeana (Reeve, 1858)
- Mitrella merita (Brazier, 1877)
- †Mitrella mikra Gardner 1947
- Mitrella millardi Lussi, 2017
- Mitrella millepunctata (P. P. Carpenter, 1864)
- Mitrella mindorensis (Reeve, 1859)
- Mitrella minisipho K. Monsecour & D. Monsecour, 2016
- Mitrella minor (Scacchi, 1836)
- Mitrella moleculina (Duclos, 1840)
- Mitrella monica Bozzetti, 2009
- Mitrella moorea K. Monsecour & D. Monsecour, 2018
- Mitrella nainai K. Monsecour & D. Monsecour, 2018
- †Mitrella nanna Gardner 1947
- Mitrella natalensis Tomlin, 1926
- Mitrella neocaledonica K. Monsecour & D. Monsecour, 2016
- Mitrella nitidulina (Locard, 1897)
- Mitrella nix K. Monsecour & D. Monsecour, 2016
- Mitrella noel Rolán & Gori, 2009
- Mitrella nomadica (Melvill & Standen, 1901)
- Mitrella nomurai Habe, 1991
- Mitrella nycteis (Duclos, 1846)
- Mitrella nympha (Kiener, 1841)
- Mitrella ocellata (Gmelin, 1791)
- †Mitrella oryzoides Gardner 1947
- Mitrella oweni Ladd, 1977 †
- Mitrella pacei (E. A. Smith, 1895)
- †Mitrella palabuanensis (K. Martin, 1895)
- †Mitrella parva (Lea, 1841)
- Mitrella parvicosta K. Monsecour & D. Monsecour, 2016
- †Mitrella parvissima Lozouet, 1999
- Mitrella patricki Bozzetti, 2006
- †Mitrella paulensis Lozouet, 1999
- Mitrella pauxillula K. Monsecour & D. Monsecour, 2016
- †Mitrella pedana Gardner 1947
- Mitrella penai Arias Ávila, 2021
- Mitrella peregrina K. Monsecour & D. Monsecour, 2016
- Mitrella peroniana (Hedley, 1913)
- †Mitrella petersi (Hilber, 1879)
- †Mitrella peyreirensis (Peyrot, 1925)
- Mitrella philia (Duclos, 1846)
- †Mitrella phyllisae Duerr 2008
- †Mitrella plateaui (Cossmann, 1889)
- Mitrella praetermissa K. Monsecour & D. Monsecour, 2016
- Mitrella profundi (Dall, 1889)
- Mitrella prolixa K. Monsecour & D. Monsecour, 2016
- Mitrella proscripta (E. A. Smith, 1890)
- †Mitrella pseudofallax (Kókay, 1966)
- Mitrella psilla (Duclos, 1846)
- Mitrella pudica (Brazier, 1877)
- Mitrella puillandrei K. Monsecour & D. Monsecour, 2024
- Mitrella pulchrior (C. B. Adams, 1852)
- Mitrella pulla (Gaskoin, 1852)
- Mitrella punctilineata Pelorce, 2020
- Mitrella pungens (A. Gould, 1860)
- Mitrella pyramidalis (G. B. Sowerby III, 1894)
- Mitrella raphaeli Drivas & M. Jay, 1990
- Mitrella regnardi (Viader, 1938)
- †Mitrella repens Lozouet, 2015
- Mitrella reunionensis Drivas & M. Jay, 1990
- Mitrella rorida (Reeve, 1859)
- Mitrella rosadoi Bozzetti, 1998
- Mitrella rubra (E. von Martens, 1881)
- Mitrella rurutu K. Monsecour & D. Monsecour, 2018
- Mitrella russeli (Brazier, 1874)
- †Mitrella saccoi (Hornung, 1920)
- Mitrella salvadorae Arias Ávila, 2021
- Mitrella samueli Pelorce, 2020
- Mitrella sanctaehelenae (E. A. Smith, 1890)
- Mitrella santabarbarensis (P. P. Carpenter, 1856)
- Mitrella saotomensis Rolán, 2005
- Mitrella scapula K. Monsecour & D. Monsecour, 2016
- Mitrella scripta (Linnaeus, 1758)
- †Mitrella semicaudata (Bellardi, 1848)
- Mitrella semiconvexa (Lamarck, 1822)
- Mitrella siciliai Rolán & Gori, 2012
- †Mitrella sima Gardner 1947 l>
- Mitrella simplex (Schepman, 1911)
- †Mitrella simplex (K. Martin, 1879)
- †Mitrella solitaria Báldi, 1966
- † Mitrella soveri Z. Kovács & Vicián, 2023
- Mitrella spiralis K. Monsecour & D. Monsecour, 2011
- Mitrella spiratella (E. von Martens, 1880)
- Mitrella stahlschmidti K. Monsecour & D. Monsecour, 2024
- Mitrella steyni Lussi, 2009
- †Mitrella subfraxa (G. D. Harris, 1899)
- †Mitrella subinflata Lozouet, 2015
- Mitrella subtilicostata K. Monsecour & D. Monsecour, 2016
- Mitrella suduirauti D. Monsecour & K. Monsecour, 2009
- †Mitrella sulcata (J. Sowerby, 1823)
- Mitrella supraplicata (E. A. Smith, 1899)
- Mitrella svelta Kobelt, 1889
- Mitrella swinneni K. Monsecour & D. Monsecour, 2011
- †Mitrella tarbelliana Lozouet, 2021
- Mitrella tayloriana (Reeve, 1859)
- Mitrella templadoi Gofas, Luque & Urra, 2019
- Mitrella tenebrosa Rolán, 2005
- †Mitrella tokyoensis Kuroda & Habe, 1954
- Mitrella tosatoi D. Monsecour & K. Monsecour, 2006
- †Mitrella tournoueri (Benoist, 1874)
- Mitrella trivialis K. Monsecour & D. Monsecour, 2016
- Mitrella tuberosa (P. P. Carpenter, 1865)
- Mitrella turbita (Duclos, 1840)
- Mitrella turriculata Yokoyama, 1922
- †Mitrella turrigera (K. Martin, 1883)
- Mitrella undulata (Schepman, 1911)
- †Mitrella vaporis Lozouet, 2015
- Mitrella vaubani K. Monsecour & D. Monsecour, 2016
- Mitrella ventriosa Pelorce, 2020
- Mitrella verdensis (Knudsen, 1956)
- †Mitrella vespertina (Olsson, 1942)
- †Mitrella vialensis (Sacco, 1890)
- †Mitrella viennensis Harzhauser & Landau, 2021
- Mitrella vincta (Tate, 1893)
- Mitrella virginiae Pelorce, 2020
- Mitrella vitrea Pelorce, 2020
- Mitrella vosvictori D. Monsecour & K. Monsecour, 2009
- Mitrella xenia (Dall, 1919)
- Mitrella yabei Nomura, 1935
- Mitrella zucconi K. Monsecour & D. Monsecour, 2024

=== Former species ===
- Mitrella acuminata (Menke, 1843) synonymized with Mitrella menkeana (Reeve, 1858)
- †Mitrela agenta Harzhauser and Kowalke 2002 synonymized with Astyris agenta (Harzhauser & Kowalke, 2002)
- Mitrella alabastroides (Kobelt, 1893): synonym of Indomitrella conspersa (Gaskoin, 1852)
- Mitrella albina (Kiener, 1841) synonymized with Graphicomassa ligula (Duclos, 1840)
- Mitrella albovittata Lopes, Coelho & Cardoso, 1965 synonymized with Mokumea albovittata (Lopes, Coelho & Cardoso, 1965)
- Mitrella angelia (Duclos, 1846) synonymized with Mitrella gervillii (Payraudeau, 1826)
- Mitrella argus (d'Orbigny, 1847) synonymized with Mitrella ocellata (Gmelin, 1791)
- Mitrella australis (Gaskoin, 1852) synonymized with Mitrella azima (Duclos, 1846)
- Mitrella bella L. A. Reeve, 1859 synonymized with Mitrella albuginosa (Reeve, 1859)
- Mitrella carinata (Hinds, 1844) synonymized with Alia carinata (Hinds, 1844)
- Mitrella celinae Kosuge, 1980 synonymized with Anarithma dorcas Kuroda & Oyama, 1971
- Mitrella callimorpha (Dall, 1919) synonymized with Alia carinata (Hinds, 1844)
- Mitrella circumstriata (Schepman, 1911) synonymized with Sulcomitrella circumstriata (Schepman, 1911)
- †Mitrella columbelloides (Cossmann, 1889) synonymized with Columbellisipho columbelloides (Cossmann, 1889)
- Mitrella compta (W. H. Webster, 1906) synonymized with Zemitrella websteri (Suter, 1913)
- Mitrella conspersa (Gaskoin, 1851) synonymized with Indomitrella conspersa (Gaskoin, 1851)
- Mitrella cruentata Mörch, 1860 synonymized with Nassarina cruentata (Mörch, 1860)
- Mitrella decollata (Brusina, 1865) synonymized with Mitrella gervillii (Payraudeau, 1826)
- Mitrella diaphana (A. E. Verrill, 1882) synonymized with Astyris diaphana A. E. Verrill, 1882
- Mitrella dissimilis (Stimpson, 1851) synonymized with Astyris lunata (Say, 1826)
- Mitrella elegans (H. Adams, 1861) synonymized with Alcira elegans H. Adams, 1861
- Mitrella elegantula Moerch, 1860 synonymized with Falsuszafrona pulchella (Blainville, 1829)
- Mitrella eximia (Reeve, 1859) synonymized with Mitrella nympha (Kiener, 1841)
- Mitrella flaminea Risso, 1826 synonymized with Mitrella scripta (Linnaeus, 1758)
- † Mitrela gardnerae Olsson & Harbison, 1953 synonymized with Juliamitrella gardnerae (Olsson & Harbison, 1953)
- Mitrella gervillei synonymized with Mitrella gervillii (Payraudeau, 1826)
- Mitrella hanleyi (Deshayes, 1863)synonymized with Mitrella floccata|iMitrella floccata hanleyi (Deshayes, 1863)
- Mitrella haziersensis (Drivas & Jay, 1990) synonymized with Indomitrella haziersensis Drivas & Jay, 1990
- Mitrella helena (Thiele, 1925) synonymized with Zemitrella helena (Thiele, 1925)
- Mitrella hidalgoi Monterosato, 1889 synonymized with Mitrella broderipi (G.B. Sowerby I, 1844)
- †Mitrella hordeola (Lamarck, 1803) synonymized with Columbellisipho hordeola (Lamarck, 1803)
- Mitrella inscripta (Brazier, 1877) synonymized with Mitrella moleculina (Duclos, 1840)
- Mitrella kanamaruana Kuroda, 1953 synonymized with Sulcomitrella kanamaruana (Kuroda, 1953)
- Mitrella lanceolata (Locard, 1886) synonymized with Mitrella svelta Kobelt, 1889
- Mitrella leptalea Suter, 1908 synonymized with Paxula leptalea (Suter, 1908)
- Mitrella ligula (Duclos, 1840) synonymized with Graphicomassa ligula (Duclos, 1840)
- Mitrella livescens (Reeve, 1859) synonymized with Euplica livescens (Reeve, 1859)
- Mitrella lunata (Say, 1826) synonymized with Astyris lunata (Say, 1826)
- Mitrella maldonadoi Luque, 1986 synonymized with Mitrella bruggeni van Aartsen, Menkhorst & Gittenberger, 1984
- Mitrella margarita (Reeve, 1859) synonymized with Graphicomassa margarita (Reeve, 1859)
- Mitrella mariopeñai Arias Ávila, 2016 synonymized with Mitrella penai Ávila, 2021
- Mitrella marminea Risso, 1826 synonymized with Aplus dorbignyi (Payraudeau, 1826)
- Mitrella marquesa (Gaskoin, 1852) synonymized with Metanachis marquesa (Gaskoin, 1852)
- Mitrella monodonta Habe, 1958 synonymized with Sulcomitrella monodonta (Habe, 1958)
- Mitrella multilineata (Dall, 1889) synonymized with Astyris multilineata (Dall, 1889)
- †Mitrella nassoides (Grateloup, 1827) synonymized with †Orthurella nassoides (Grateloup, 1827)
- Mitrella ocellina (Nordsieck, 1975) synonymized with Mitrella broderipi (G.B. Sowerby I, 1844)
- Mitrella pallaryi (Dautzenberg, 1927) synonymized with Mitrella canariensis (d'Orbigny, 1840)
- Mitrella permodesta (Dall, 1890) synonymized with Astyris permodesta (Dall, 1890)
- Mitrella peruviana Arias Ávila, 2016 synonymized with Mitrella salvadorae Arias Ávila, 2021
- Mitrella pseudomarginata Suter, 1908 synonymized with Zemitrella pseudomarginata (Suter, 1908)
- Mitrella puella (G.B. Sowerby I, 1844) synonymized with Indomitrella puella (G. B. Sowerby I, 1844)
- Mitrella pura (A. E. Verrill, 1882) synonymized with Astyris pura A. E. Verrill, 1882
- Mitrella rac (Dautzenberg, 1891) synonymized with Mitrella turbita (Duclos, 1840)
- Mitrella raveneli (Dall, 1889) synonymized with Astyris raveneli Dall, 1889
- Mitrella rosacea (Gould, 1840) synonymized with Astyris rosacea (Gould, 1840)
- Mitrella schepmani Monsecour & Monsecour, 2006 synonymized with Indomitrella schepmani (K. Monsecour & D. Monsecour, 2007)
- Mitrella spelta (Kobelt, 1893) synonymized with Mitrella svelta Kobelt, 1889
- Mitrella stephanophora Suter, 1908 synonymized with Zemitrella stephanophora (Suter, 1908)
- Mitrella subantarctica Suter, 1908 synonymized with Paxula subantarctica (Suter, 1908)
- Mitrella suzannae Drivas & Jay, 1990 synonymized with Pleuriferapex suzannae (Drivas & Jay, 1990)
- Mitrella syrtiaca Pallary, 1906 synonymized with Mitrella svelta Kobelt, 1889
- Mitrella unifasciata (G. B. Sowerby I, 1832) synonymized with Alia unifasciata (G. B. Sowerby I, 1832)
- Mitrella variegata (Stearns, 1873) synonymized with Mitrella hypodra (Dall, 1916)
- Mitrella vatovai Coen, 1933 synonymized with Mitrella coccinea (R. A. Philippi, 1836)
- Mitrella venulata (Sowerby, 1894) synonymized with Mitrella nympha (Kiener, 1841)
- Mitrella websteri Suter, 1913 synonymized with Zemitrella websteri (Suter, 1913)

== Gallery ==
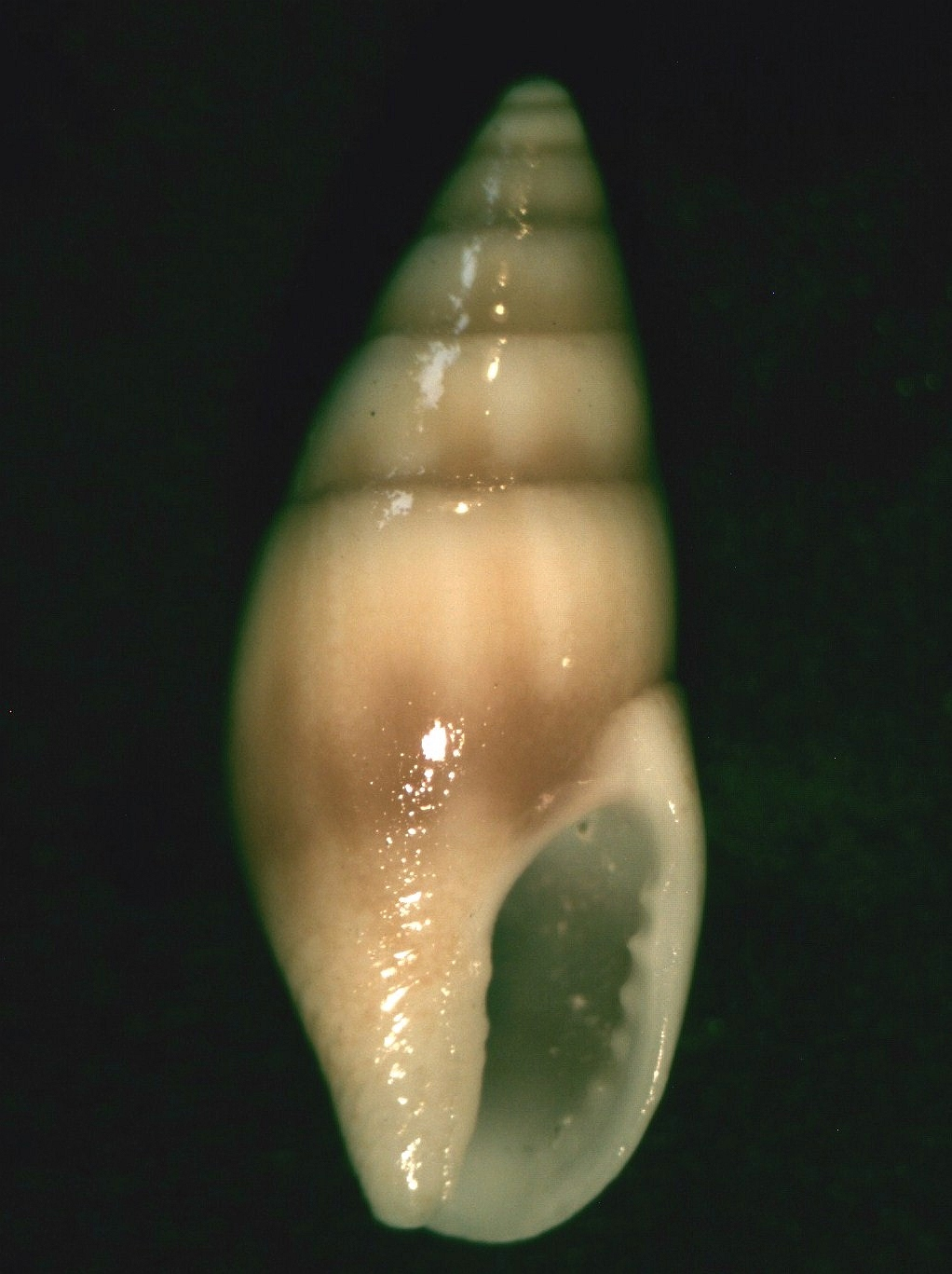
Mitrella austrina

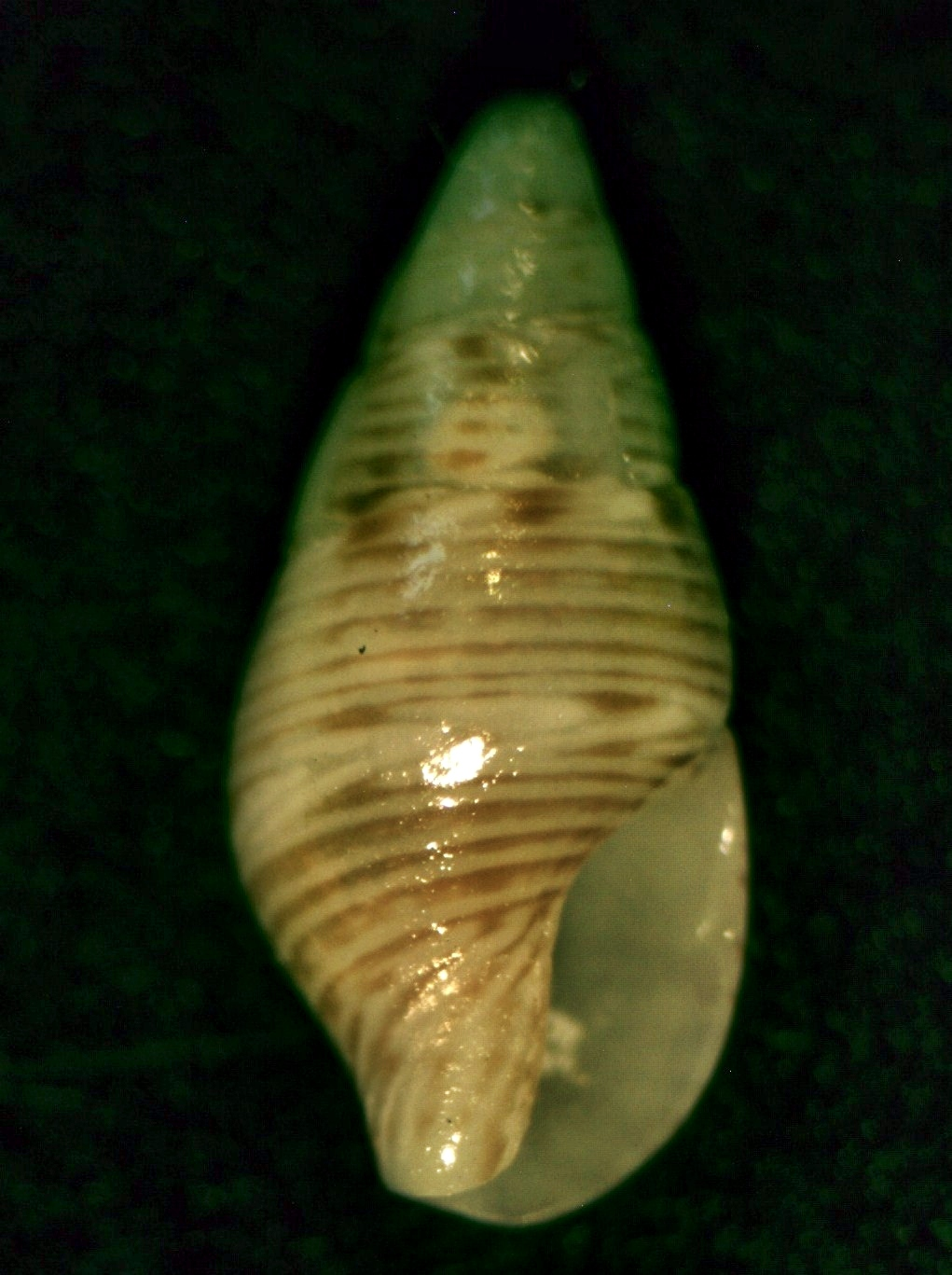
Mitrella dictua

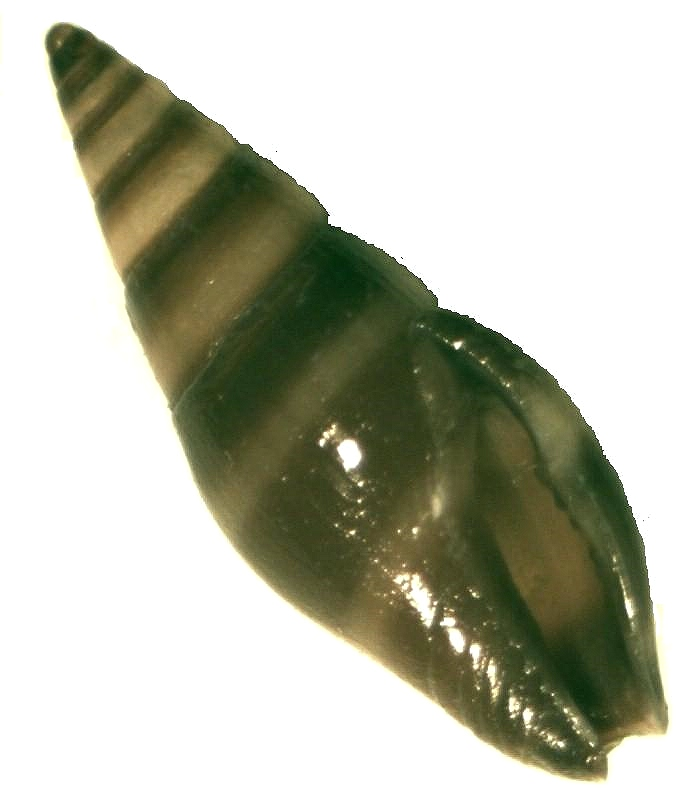
Mitrella essingtonensis

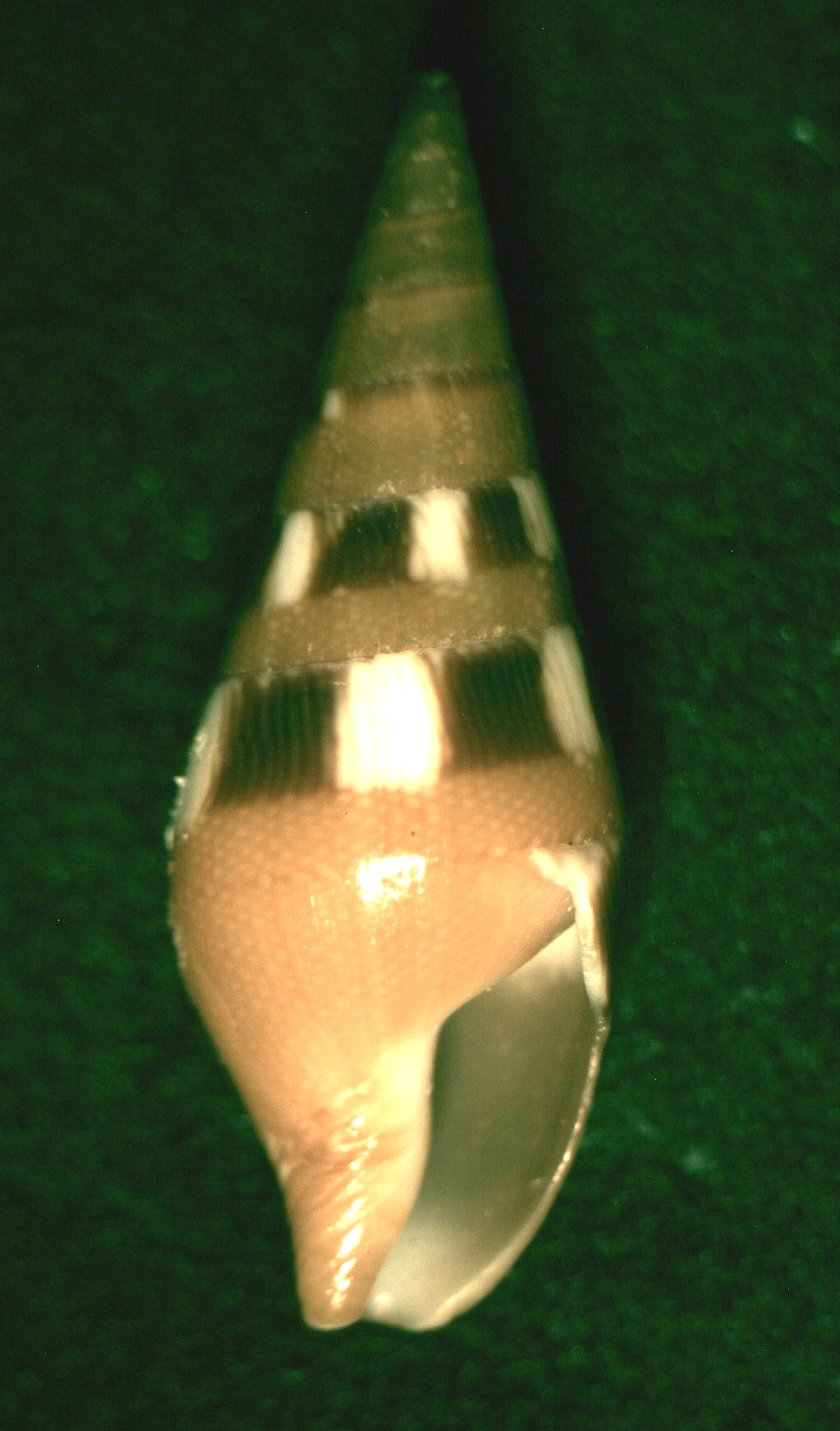
Mitrella menkeana
