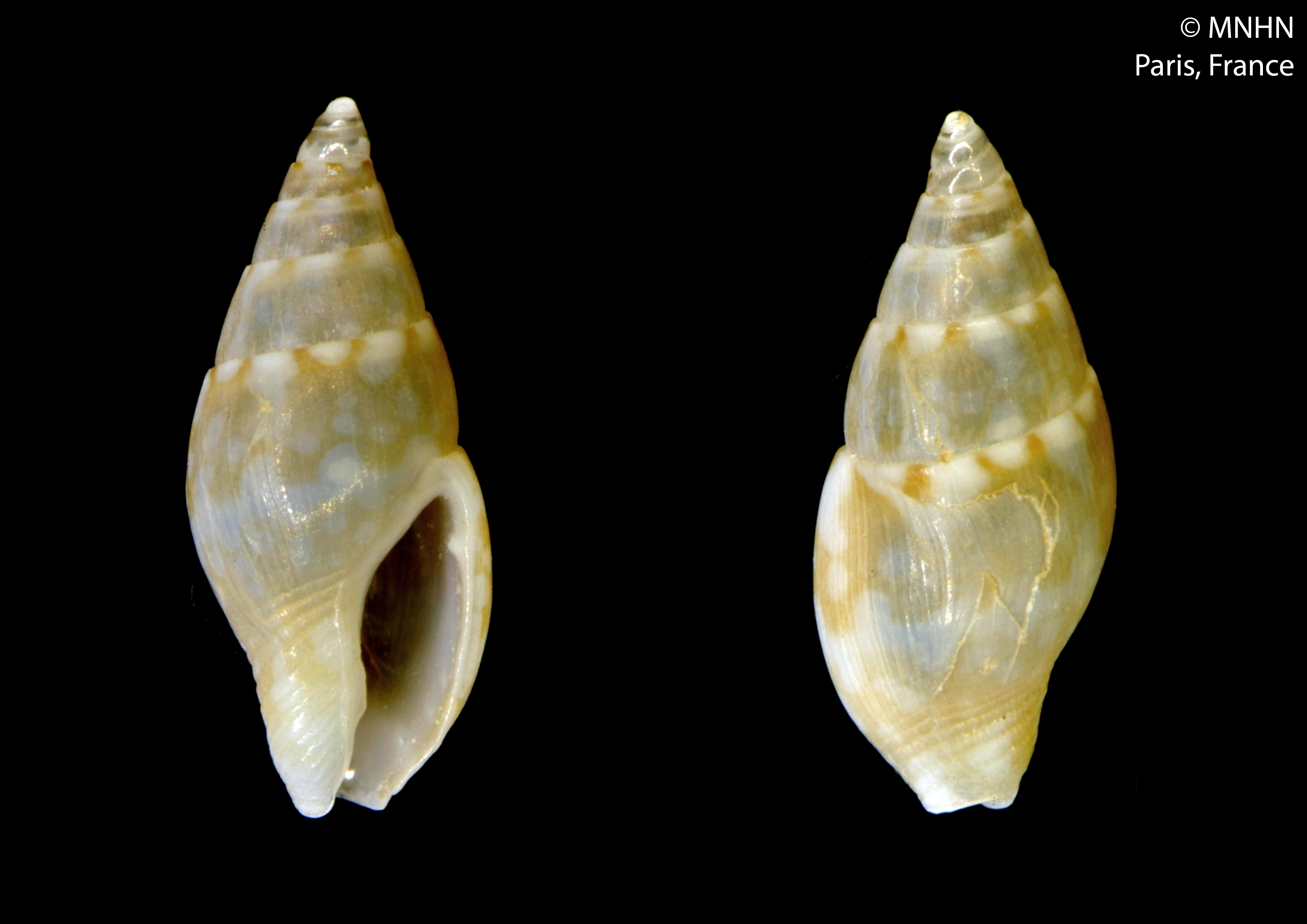
- Shell of Mitrella cuspidata (specimen at MNHN, Paris)

Scientific classification
- Kingdom: Animalia
- Phylum: Mollusca
- Class: Gastropoda
- Subclass: Caenogastropoda
- Order: Neogastropoda
- Family: Columbellidae
- Genus: Mitrella
- Species: M. cuspidata

Binomial name
- Mitrella cuspidata Lussi, 2009

= Mitrella cuspidata =

Species of gastropod

Mitrella cuspidata is a species of sea snail, a marine gastropod mollusk in the family Columbellidae, the dove snails.

== Distribution ==
This marine species occurs off the Marquesas Islands. The holotype was found in Durban Bay, South Africa.
