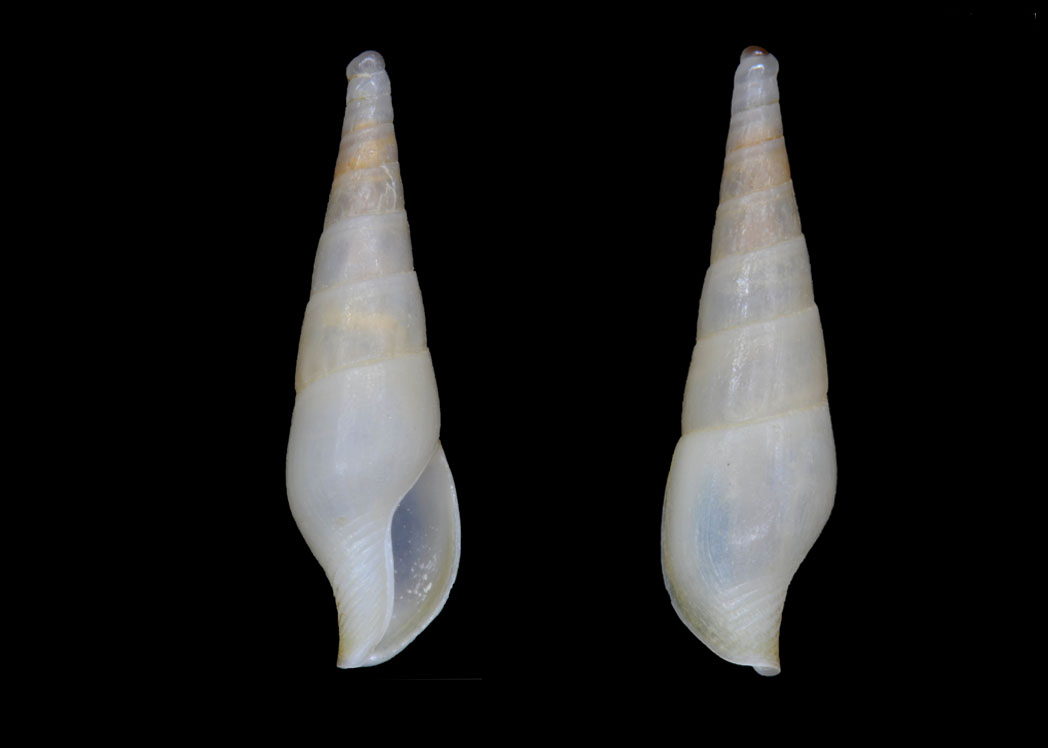
- Shells of Mitrella gracilis (holotype in MNHN, Paris)

Scientific classification
- Kingdom: Animalia
- Phylum: Mollusca
- Class: Gastropoda
- Subclass: Caenogastropoda
- Order: Neogastropoda
- Superfamily: Buccinoidea
- Family: Columbellidae
- Genus: Mitrella
- Species: M. gracilis

Binomial name
- Mitrella gracilis K. Monsecour & D. Monsecour, 2016

= Mitrella gracilis =

Species of gastropod

Mitrella gracilis is a species of sea snail, a marine gastropod mollusk in the family Columbellidae, the dove snails.

== Description ==
Length of the shell reaches 10.6 mm.

== Biology ==
This species is a predator.

== Distribution ==
This marine species occurs off the Norfolk Ridge, New Caledonia.
