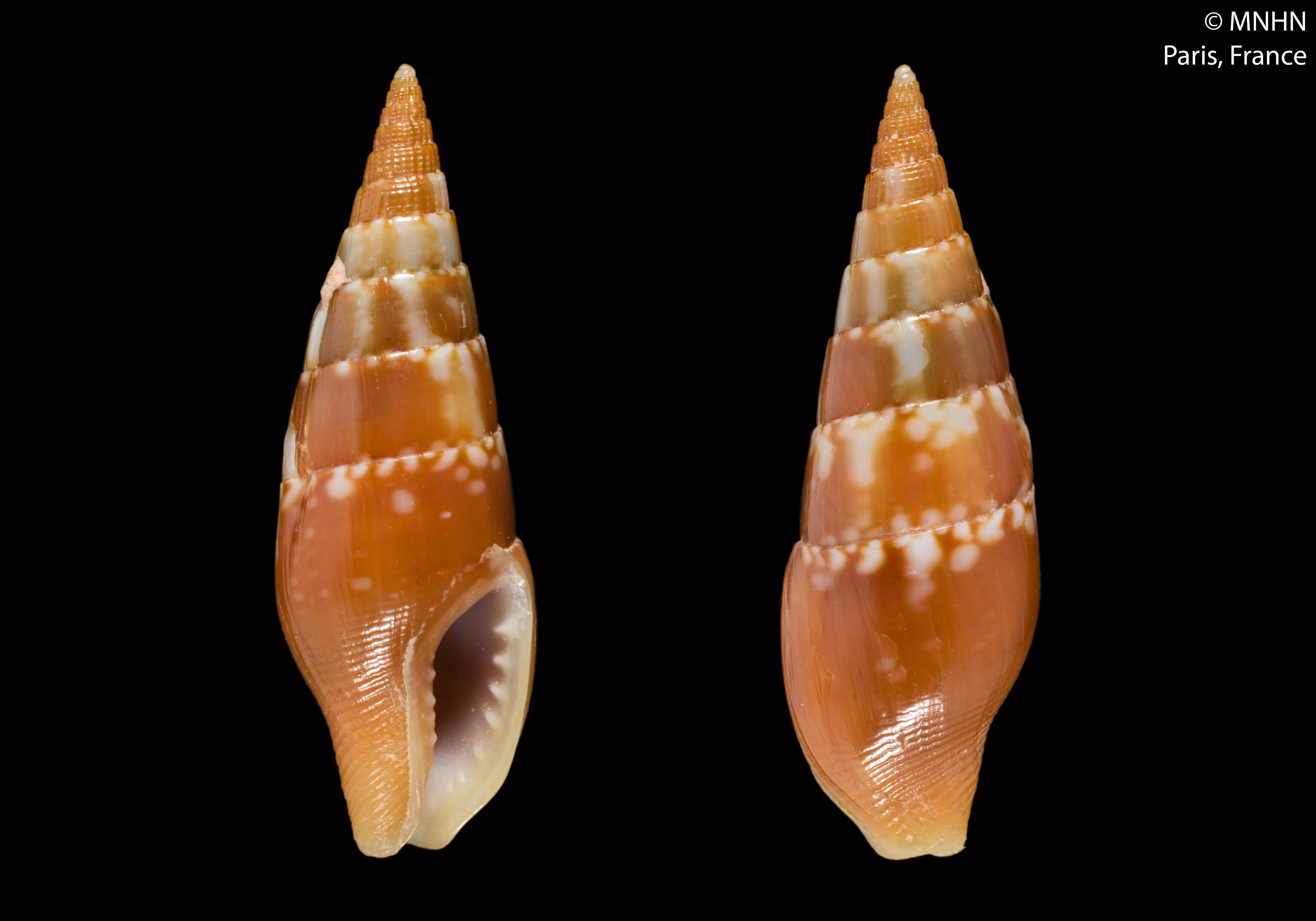
- Shell of Mitrella suduirauti (holotype at MNHN, Paris)

Scientific classification
- Kingdom: Animalia
- Phylum: Mollusca
- Class: Gastropoda
- Subclass: Caenogastropoda
- Order: Neogastropoda
- Family: Columbellidae
- Genus: Mitrella
- Species: M. suduirauti

Binomial name
- Mitrella suduirauti Monsecour & Monsecour, 2009

= Mitrella suduirauti =

Species of gastropod

Mitrella suduirauti is a species of sea snail in the family Columbellidae, the dove snails.

== Description ==
The length of the shell attains 21.6 mm.

== Distribution ==
This species occurs in the Sulu Sea off the Philippines.
