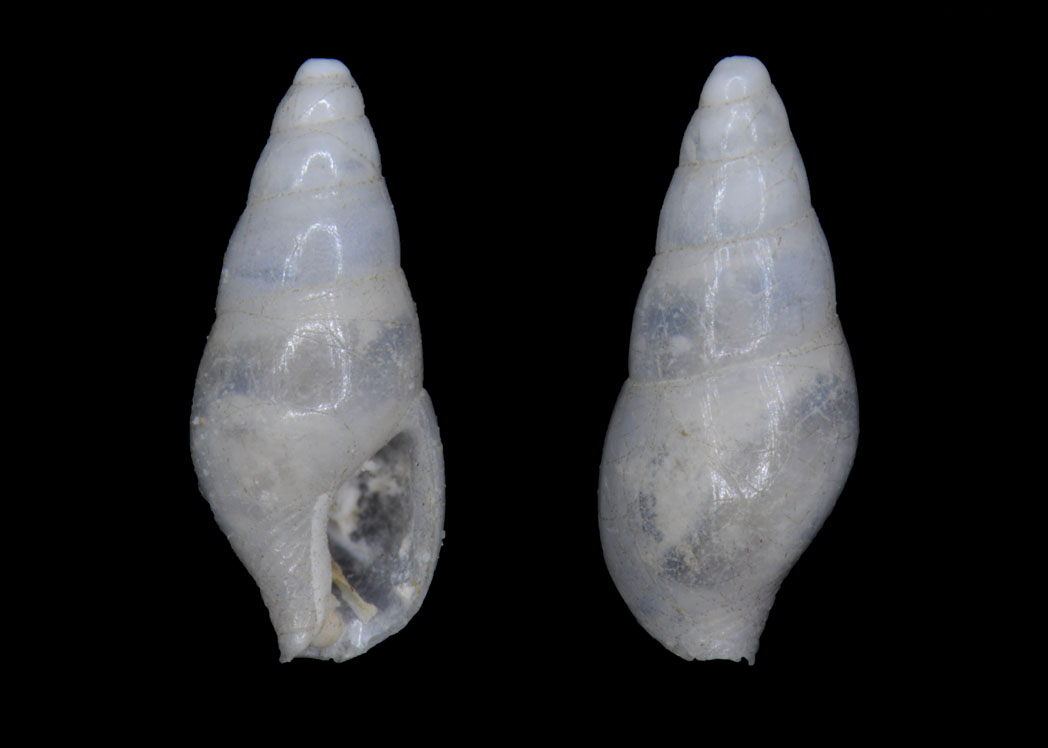
- Shells of Mitrella minisipho (holotype in MNHN, Paris)

Scientific classification
- Kingdom: Animalia
- Phylum: Mollusca
- Class: Gastropoda
- Subclass: Caenogastropoda
- Order: Neogastropoda
- Superfamily: Buccinoidea
- Family: Columbellidae
- Genus: Mitrella
- Species: M. minisipho

Binomial name
- Mitrella minisipho K. Monsecour & D. Monsecour, 2016

= Mitrella minisipho =

Species of gastropod

Mitrella minisipho is a species of sea snail, a marine gastropod mollusk in the family Columbellidae, the dove snails.

== Description ==
- The length of the shell attains 4.2 mm.
- Depth range 360–569 m.

== Distribution ==
This marine species occurs off New Caledonia.
