= Mitrella guanahaniensis =

Scientific classification
- Kingdom: Animalia
- Phylum: Mollusca
- Class: Gastropoda
- Subclass: Caenogastropoda
- Order: Neogastropoda
- Family: Columbellidae
- Genus: Mitrella
- Species: M. guanahaniensis

Binomial name
- Mitrella guanahaniensis Faber, 2004

Species of gastropod

Mitrella guanahaniensis is a species of sea snail in the family Columbellidae, the dove snails.
