= Mitrella verdensis =

Scientific classification
- Kingdom: Animalia
- Phylum: Mollusca
- Class: Gastropoda
- Subclass: Caenogastropoda
- Order: Neogastropoda
- Family: Columbellidae
- Genus: Mitrella
- Species: M. verdensis

Binomial name
- Mitrella verdensis (Knudsen, 1956)

Species of gastropod

Mitrella verdensis is a species of sea snail in the family Columbellidae, the dove snails.
