= Mitrella rosadoi =

Scientific classification
- Kingdom: Animalia
- Phylum: Mollusca
- Class: Gastropoda
- Subclass: Caenogastropoda
- Order: Neogastropoda
- Family: Columbellidae
- Genus: Mitrella
- Species: M. rosadoi

Binomial name
- Mitrella rosadoi Bozzetti, 1998

Species of gastropod

Mitrella rosadoi is a species of sea snail in the family Columbellidae, the dove snails.
