= Mitrella noel =

Scientific classification
- Kingdom: Animalia
- Phylum: Mollusca
- Class: Gastropoda
- Subclass: Caenogastropoda
- Order: Neogastropoda
- Family: Columbellidae
- Genus: Mitrella
- Species: M. noel

Binomial name
- Mitrella noel Rolan & Gori, 2009

Species of gastropod

Mitrella noel is a species of sea snail in the family Columbellidae, the dove snails.

== Distribution ==
The species is endemic to the island of São Tomé.
