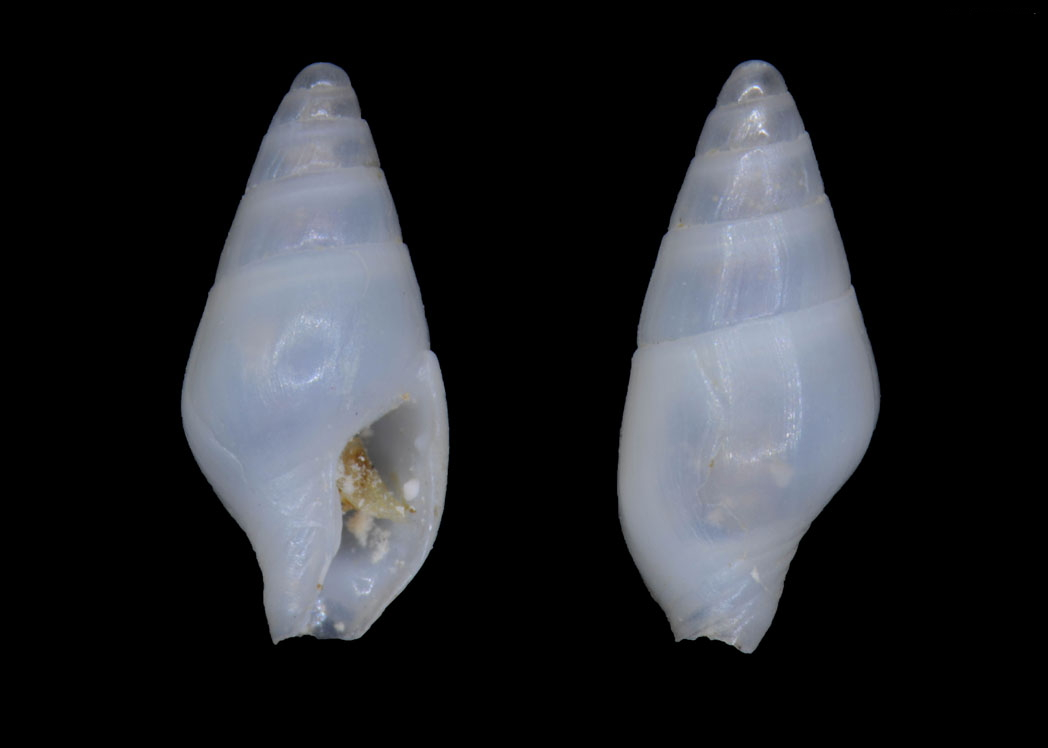
- Shells of Mitrella trivialis (holotype in MNHN, Paris)

Scientific classification
- Kingdom: Animalia
- Phylum: Mollusca
- Class: Gastropoda
- Subclass: Caenogastropoda
- Order: Neogastropoda
- Superfamily: Buccinoidea
- Family: Columbellidae
- Genus: Mitrella
- Species: M. trivialis

Binomial name
- Mitrella trivialis K. Monsecour & D. Monsecour, 2016

= Mitrella trivialis =

Species of gastropod

Mitrella trivialis is a species of sea snail, a marine gastropod mollusk in the family Columbellidae, the dove snails.

== Description ==
The length of the shell attains 4.6 mm.

== Distribution ==
This marine species occurs off New Caledonia
