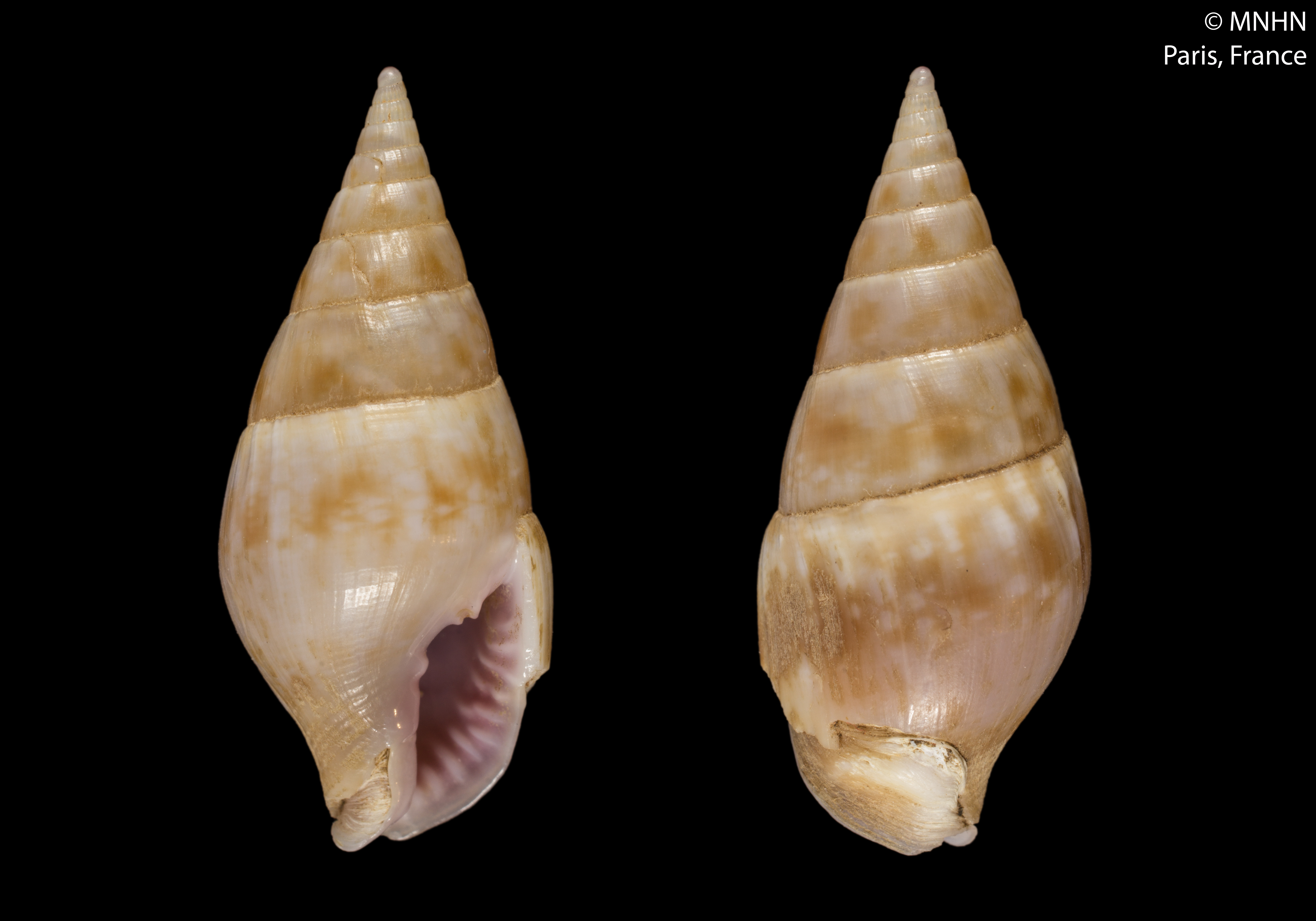
- Shell of Mitrella tosatoi (holotype at MNHN, Paris)

Scientific classification
- Kingdom: Animalia
- Phylum: Mollusca
- Class: Gastropoda
- Subclass: Caenogastropoda
- Order: Neogastropoda
- Family: Columbellidae
- Genus: Mitrella
- Species: M. tosatoi

Binomial name
- Mitrella tosatoi Monsecour & Monsecour, 2006

= Mitrella tosatoi =

Species of gastropod

Mitrella tosatoi is a species of sea snail in the family Columbellidae, the dove snails.

== Description ==
The length of the shell attains 26.3 mm.

== Distribution ==
This marine species occurs off Martinique.
