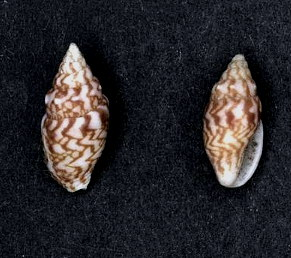
- Two views of a shell of Mitrella semiconvexa (museum specimens at Naturalis Biodiversity Center)

Scientific classification
- Kingdom: Animalia
- Phylum: Mollusca
- Class: Gastropoda
- Subclass: Caenogastropoda
- Order: Neogastropoda
- Family: Columbellidae
- Genus: Mitrella
- Species: M. semiconvexa

Binomial name
- Mitrella semiconvexa (Lamarck, 1822)

Synonyms
- Buccinum semiconvexum Lamarck, 1822 (original combination); Columbella infumata Crosse, 1863; Columbella nux Reeve, 1859; Columbella strigata Reeve, 1859

= Mitrella semiconvexa =

Species of gastropod

Mitrella semiconvexa is a species of sea snail in the family Columbellidae, the dove snails.

== Description ==
The shell may reach 20 mm in length.

The ovate, conical shell is very pointed at its summit. It is pale red, often ornamented, with longitudinal waved and distant bands. Sometimes elongated spots appear upon the whorls of the spire, which are eight or nine in number; the lowest are convex. The base of the shell is marked with very fine, and very approximate striae. The ovate aperture is elongated, of a whitish color. The outer lip is rounded and striated internally. The columella is arched and smooth.

== Distribution ==
This marine species is endemic to Australia where it occurs off New South Wales, South Australia, Tasmania, Victoria and Western Australia.
