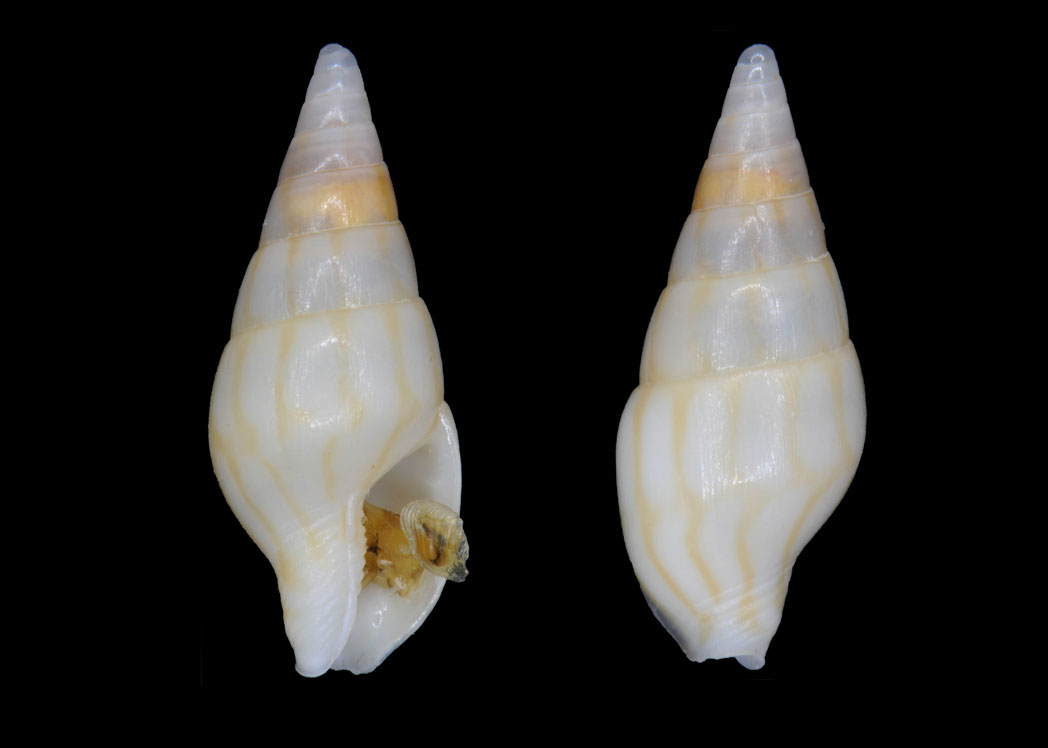
- Shells of Mitrella angustalineata (holotype in MNHN, Paris)

Scientific classification
- Kingdom: Animalia
- Phylum: Mollusca
- Class: Gastropoda
- Subclass: Caenogastropoda
- Order: Neogastropoda
- Superfamily: Buccinoidea
- Family: Columbellidae
- Genus: Mitrella
- Species: M. angustalineata

Binomial name
- Mitrella angustalineata K. Monsecour & D. Monsecour, 2016

= Mitrella angustalineata =

Species of marine gastropod mollusk

Mitrella angustalineata is a species of sea snail, a marine gastropod mollusk in the family Columbellidae, the dove snails.

== Description ==
The shell of the Mitrella Angustalineata is white with slightly transparent vertical yellow stripes, along with a small yellow patch near the pointy extremity.

The length of the shell attains 11 mm (0.43 in ).

== Distribution ==
This marine species occurs off New Caledonia
