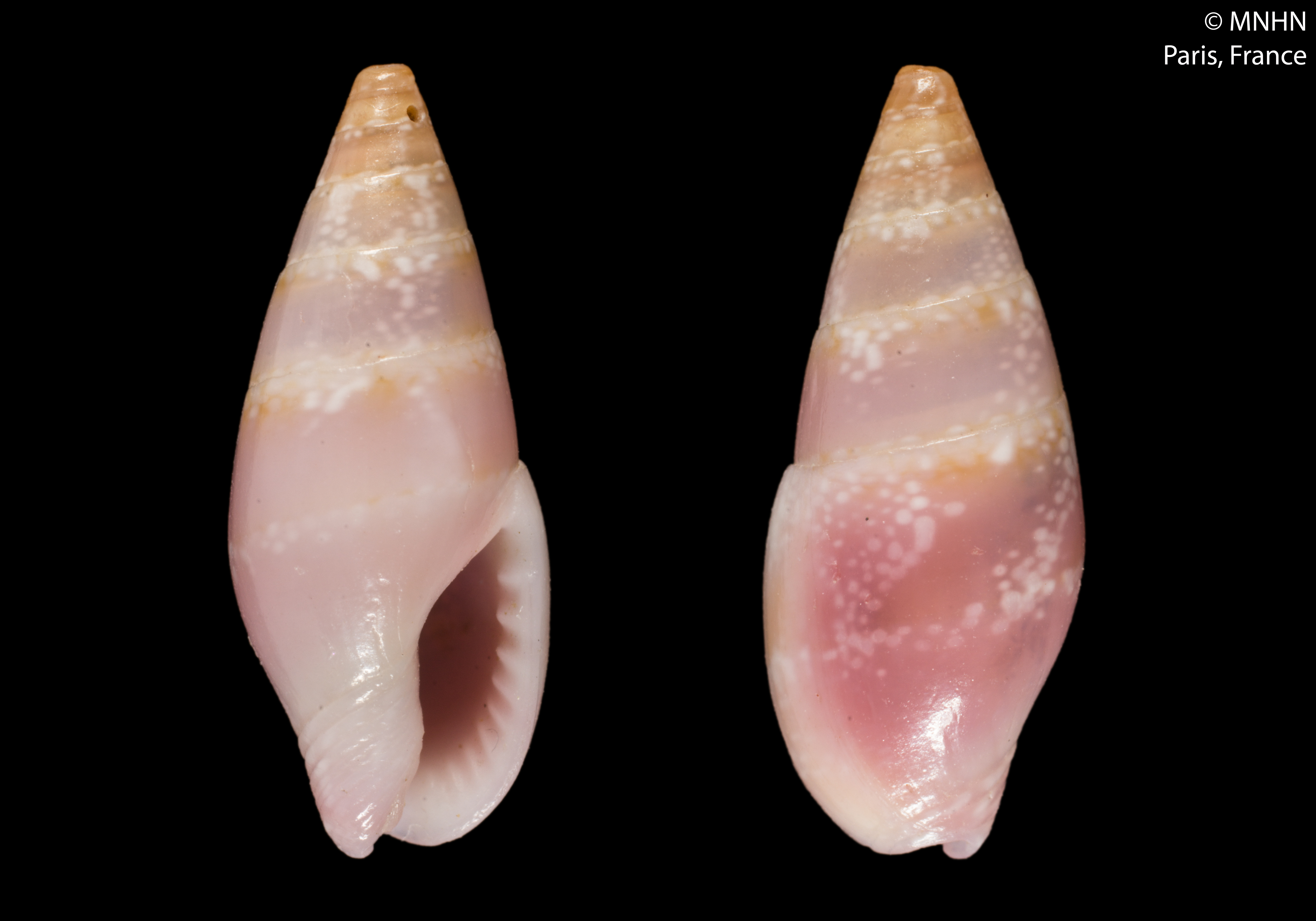
- Shell of Mitrella elianeae (holotype at MNHN, Paris)

Scientific classification
- Kingdom: Animalia
- Phylum: Mollusca
- Class: Gastropoda
- Subclass: Caenogastropoda
- Order: Neogastropoda
- Family: Columbellidae
- Genus: Mitrella
- Species: M. elianeae

Binomial name
- Mitrella elianeae Bozzetti, 2006

= Mitrella elianeae =

Species of gastropod

Mitrella elianeae is a species of sea snail in the family Columbellidae, the dove snails.

== Description ==
The shell has a length of 10.5 mm.

== Distribution ==
This marine species is found near Madagascar.
