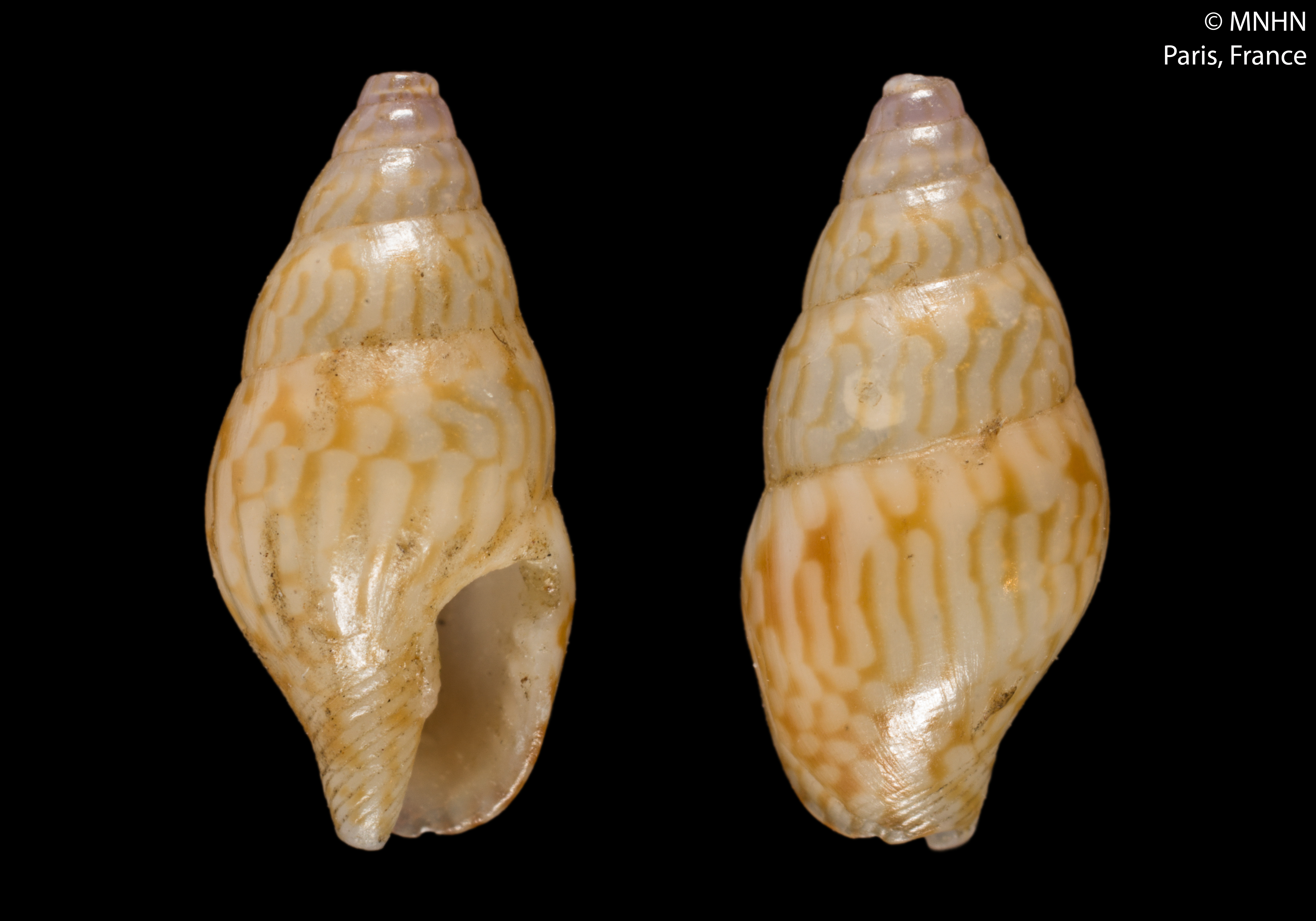
- Shell of Mitrella turbita (lectotype at MNHN, Paris)

Scientific classification
- Kingdom: Animalia
- Phylum: Mollusca
- Class: Gastropoda
- Subclass: Caenogastropoda
- Order: Neogastropoda
- Family: Columbellidae
- Genus: Mitrella
- Species: M. turbita

Binomial name
- Mitrella turbita (Duclos, 1840)

Synonyms
- Colombella phylina P.L. Duclos, 1846; Colombella turbita Duclos, 1840 (original combination); Columbella (Mitrella) broderipi var. lutea Maltzan, 1884; Columbella phylina Duclos, 1846; Columbella rac Dautzenberg, 1891; Mitrella rac (Dautzenberg, 1891)

= Mitrella turbita =

Species of gastropod

Mitrella turbita is a species of sea snail in the family Columbellidae, the dove snails.

== Description ==
The height of the shell ranges between 22.3 and 24.1 mm with its width ranging from 39.3 to 42.4 mm. The Mitrella Turbita's shell has thick ridges with short spines, located mainly at the shoulder region. Its inter-ridge areas display spiral and axial striations. The shell's color is usually cream or light brown. Its operculum is corneous and thin, and has a spire with a height ranging from 9.4 to 11.6 mm.
