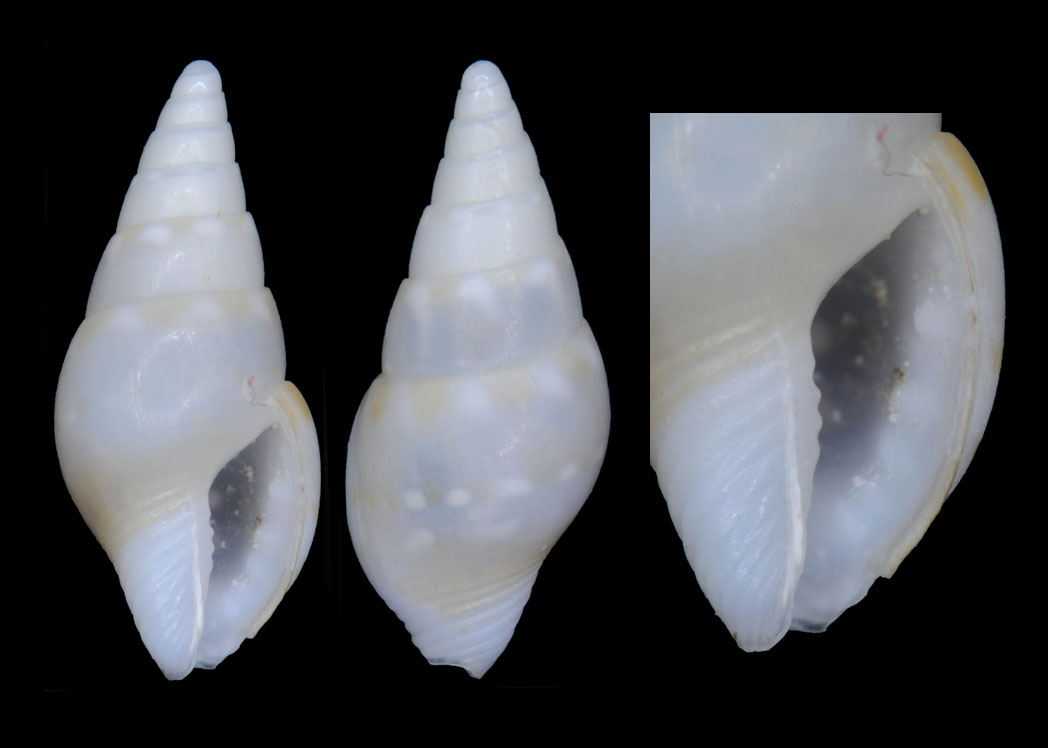
- Shells of Mitrella bellonae (holotype in MNHN, Paris)

Scientific classification
- Kingdom: Animalia
- Phylum: Mollusca
- Class: Gastropoda
- Subclass: Caenogastropoda
- Order: Neogastropoda
- Superfamily: Buccinoidea
- Family: Columbellidae
- Genus: Mitrella
- Species: M. bellonae

Binomial name
- Mitrella bellonae K. Monsecour & D. Monsecour, 2016

= Mitrella bellonae =

Species of gastropod

Mitrella bellonae is a sea snail. It belongs to the family Columbellidae, which are commonly known as dove snails. These marine gastropods are small but captivating creatures. They are renowned for their delicate and often intricately patterned shells. Mitrella bellonae stands out within this family. This is due to its specific morphological characteristics and its ecological role in the marine environments it inhabits. Dove snails, including Mitrella bellonae, typically have elongated, conical shells. These shells are smooth and glossy. The shells often have subtle color variations and patterns. These patterns not only serve as camouflage but also contribute to the species' aesthetic appeal. The compact size and beautiful appearance of these snails make them a subject of interest for both marine biologists and shell collectors.

== Description ==
The length of the shell attains 8.9 mm (0.35 in).

== Distribution ==
This marine species occurs off New Caledonia.
