= Mitrella jacoi =

Scientific classification
- Kingdom: Animalia
- Phylum: Mollusca
- Class: Gastropoda
- Subclass: Caenogastropoda
- Order: Neogastropoda
- Family: Columbellidae
- Genus: Mitrella
- Species: M. jacoi

Binomial name
- Mitrella jacoi Lussi, 2002

Species of gastropod

Mitrella jacoi is a species of sea snail in the family Columbellidae, the dove snails.
