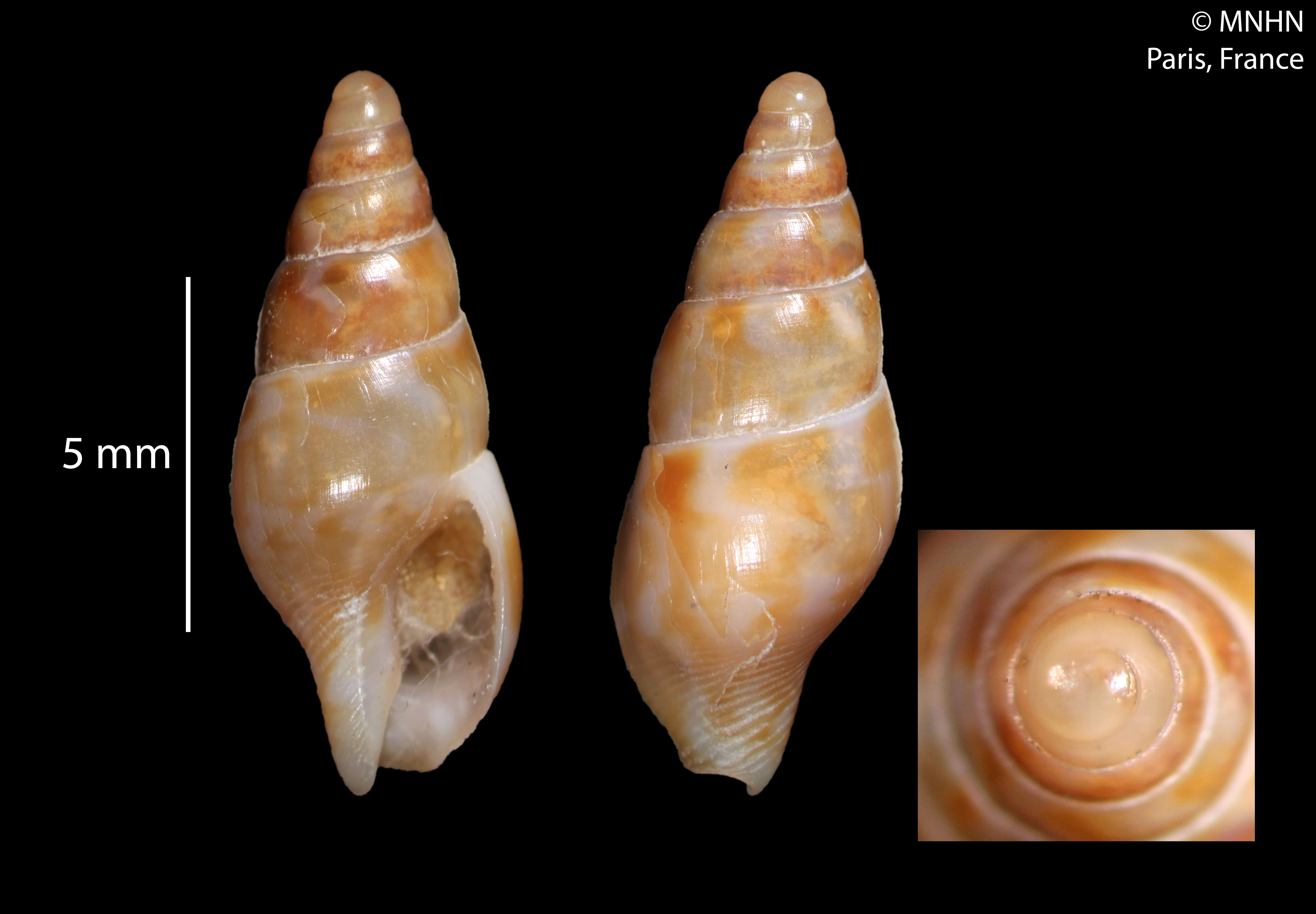
- Shell of Mitrella cabofrioensis (paratype at MNHN, Paris)

Scientific classification
- Kingdom: Animalia
- Phylum: Mollusca
- Class: Gastropoda
- Subclass: Caenogastropoda
- Order: Neogastropoda
- Family: Columbellidae
- Genus: Mitrella
- Species: M. cabofrioensis

Binomial name
- Mitrella cabofrioensis Costa & de Souza, 2001

= Mitrella cabofrioensis =

Species of gastropod

Mitrella cabofrioensis is a species of sea snail in the family Columbellidae, the dove snails.

== Distribution ==
This marine species occurs off Brazil.
