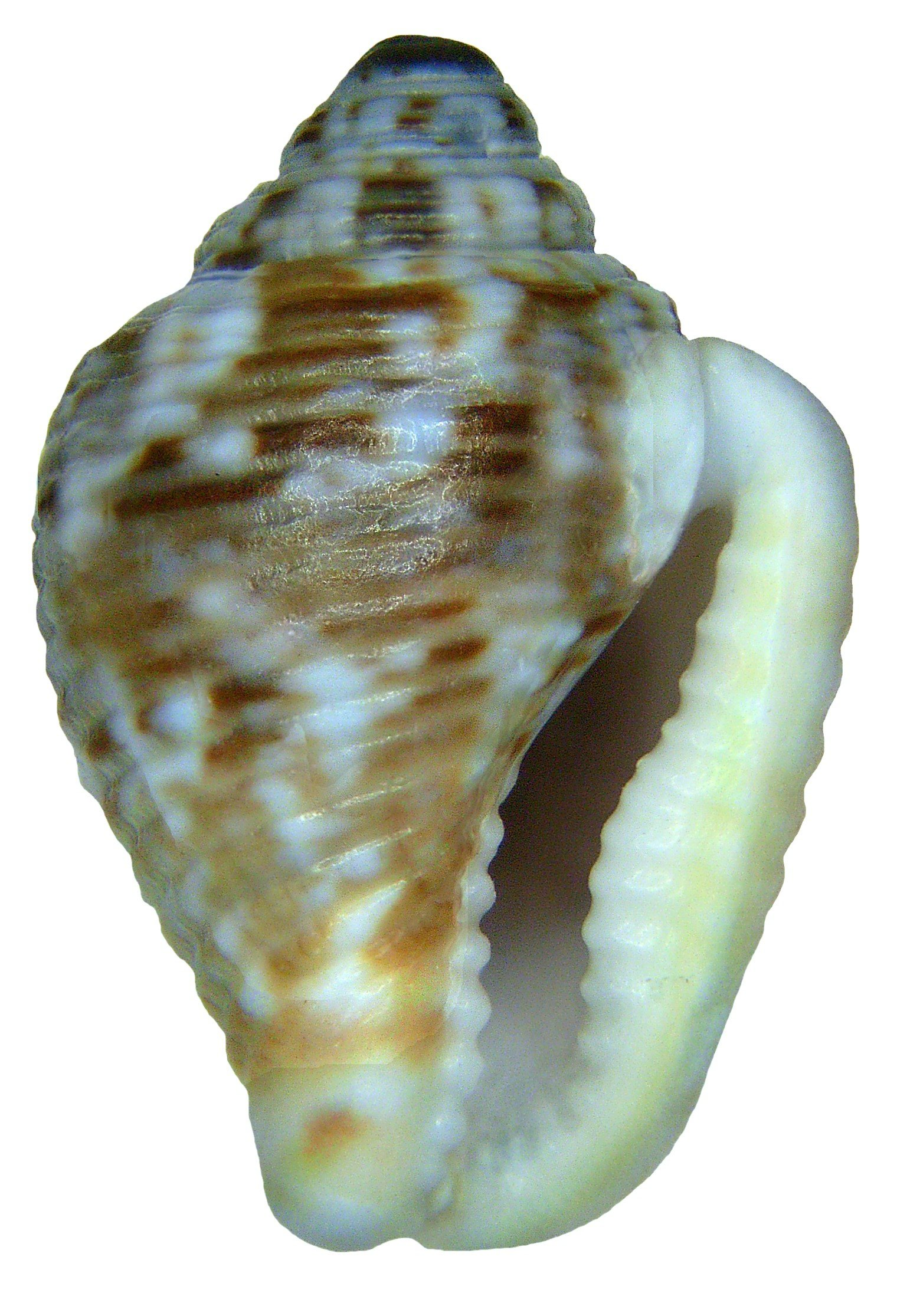
- Columbella mercatoria shell

Scientific classification
- Kingdom: Animalia
- Phylum: Mollusca
- Class: Gastropoda
- Subclass: Caenogastropoda
- Order: Neogastropoda
- Superfamily: Buccinoidea
- Family: Columbellidae
- Genus: Columbella; Lamarck, 1799

Synonyms
- Colombella (incorrect subsequent spelling); Columbella (Conidea) Swainson, 1840; Pygmaea Mörch, 1859

= Columbella =

Genus of gastropods

Columbella is a genus of small sea snails, marine gastropod mollusks in the family Columbellidae, the dove snails.

== Species ==
Species within the genus Columbella include:

- Columbella adansoni Menke, 1853
- Columbella aphthaegera R.P. Lesson, 1842
- Columbella aureomexicana (Howard, 1963)
- Columbella castanea G.B. Sowerby, 1832
- Columbella costa Simone, 2007
- Columbella dysoni Reeve, 1859
- Columbella fuscata G.B. Sowerby, 1832
- Columbella haemastoma Sowerby I, 1832
- Columbella labiosa Sowerby I, 1822
- Columbella major Sowerby I, 1832
- Columbella marrae Garcia E., 1999
- Columbella mercatoria (Linnaeus, 1758)
- Columbella paytensis Lesson, 1830
- Columbella rustica (Linnaeus, 1758)
- Columbella rusticoides Heilprin, 1886
- Columbella socorroensis Shasky, 1970
- Columbella sonsonatensis (Mörch, 1860)
- Columbella strombiformis Lamarck, 1822
- Columbella xiphitella Duclos, 1840

Nomen dubium

- Columbella erythraeensis:
- Columbella nomanensis:

Taxa inquirenda

- Columbella aricia P.L. Duclos, 1846
- Columbella asopis P.L. Duclos, 1846
- Columbella azima P.L. Duclos, 1846
- Columbella cledonida P.L. Duclos, 1846
- Columbella helvia Duclos, 1846
- Columbella isabellina Crosse, 1865
- Columbella kirostra Duclos, 1840
- Columbella mariae Brazier, 1877
- Columbella menaletta Duclos, 1846
- Columbella michaui Crosse & P. Fischer, 1863
- Columbella ortigia Duclos, 1848
- Columbella prosymnia Duclos, 1850 (taxon inquirendum, a species of Chauvetia)
- Columbella strenella Duclos, 1840
- Columbella teophania Duclos, 1848
- Columbella testina Duclos, 1840
- Columbella ticaonis G. B. Sowerby I, 1844 (taxuse in recent literature currently undocumented)
- Columbella vitula Barnard, 1959

== Species brought into synonymy ==
- Columbella alabastrum v. Martens, 1880;: synonym of Mitrella conspersa (Gaskoin, 1851)
- Columbella albina Kiener, 1840: synonym of Mitrella albina (Kiener, 1841)
- Columbella alphonsiana Hervier, 1900: synonym of Mitromorpha alphonsiana (Hervier, 1900)
- Columbella anakisia Duclos, 1850: synonym of Engina anakisia (Duclos, 1850)
- Columbella apicata Smith, 1899: synonym of Mitrella apicata (E. A. Smith, 1899)
- Columbella azora Duclos, 1846: synonym of Euplica festiva (Deshayes, 1834)
- Columbella catenata G.B. Sowerby I, 1844: synonym of Anachis catenata (G.B. Sowerby, 1844)
- Columbella circumstriata Schepman, 1911 : synonym of Mitrella circumstriata (Schepman, 1911)
- Columbella concinna G.B. Sowerby I, 1822: synonym of Rhombinella laevigata (Linnaeus, 1758)
- Columbella coniformis G.B. Sowerby I, 1844: synonym of Parametaria epamella (Duclos, 1840)
- Columbella conspersa: synonym of Mitrella conspersa (Gaskoin, 1851)
- Columbella coronata G.B. Sowerby I, 1832: synonym of Anachis coronata (G.B. Sowerby I, 1832)
- Columbella costellata G.B. Sowerby I, 1832: synonym of Anachis vexillum (Reeve, 1858)
- Columbella costellata Broderip & G.B. Sowerby I, 1829: synonym of Anachis costellata (Broderip & G.B. Sowerby I, 1829)
- Columbella decorata Gould, 1860 in 1859-61 : synonym of Anachis sertularium (d'Orbigny, 1841)
- Columbella decussata Sowerby I, 1844: synonym of Pyrene decussata (Sowerby I, 1844)
- Columbella dibolos Barnard, 1964: synonym of Anarithma stepheni (Melvill & Standen, 1897)
- Columbella dichroa G.B. Sowerby I, 1844: synonym of Mitrella dichroa (G.B. Sowerby I, 1844)
- Columbella dormitor G.B. Sowerby I, 1844: synonym of Mitromorpha dormitor (Sowerby I, 1844)
- Columbella duclosiana G.B. Sowerby I, 1844: synonym of Pseudanachis duclosiana (G.B. Sowerby I, 1844)
- Columbella elongata Schepman, 1911 : synonym of Mitrella longissima Monsecour & Monsecour, 2007
- Columbella exilis: synonym of Zafra exilis (Philippi, 1849)
- Columbella eximia: synonym of Mitrella eximia (Reeve, 1846)
- Columbella fabula G.B. Sowerby I, 1844: synonym of Pardalinops testudinaria (Link, 1807)
- Columbella fasciata G.B. Sowerby I, 1825: synonym of Anachis fasciata (G.B. Sowerby I, 1825)
- Columbella flava (Bruguière, 1789): synonym of Pyrene flava (Bruguière, 1789)
- Columbella floccata Reeve, 1859: synonym of Mitrella floccata (Reeve, 1859)
- Columbella fluctuata G.B. Sowerby I, 1832: synonym of Anachis fluctuata (G.B. Sowerby I, 1832)
- Columbella fulgurans Lamarck, 1822: synonym of Pictocolumbella ocellata (Link, 1807)
- Columbella galaxias: synonym of Mitrella nympha (Kiener, 1841)
- Columbella gervillei (Payraudeau 1826): synonym of Mitrella gervillii (Payraudeau, 1826)
- Columbella gowllandi Brazier, 1874: synonym of Zafra pumila (Dunker, 1858)
- Columbella guttata G.B. Sowerby I, 1832: synonym of Mitrella guttata (G.B. Sowerby I, 1832)
- Columbella harpiformis G.B. Sowerby I, 1832: synonym of Microcithara harpiformis (G.B. Sowerby I, 1832)
- Columbella impolita G.B. Sowerby I, 1844: synonym of Mitrella impolita (G.B. Sowerby I, 1844)
- Columbella jaspidea G.B. Sowerby I, 1844: synonym of Metanachis jaspidea (G.B. Sowerby I, 1844)
- Columbella kraussi G.B. Sowerby I, 1844: synonym of Anachis kraussi (G.B. Sowerby I, 1844)
- Columbella levania Duclos, 1848: synonym of [unassigned] Mitromorphidae levania (Duclos, 1848) (taxon inquerendum)
- Columbella ligula Duclos: synonym of Mitrella ligula (Duclos, 1835)
- Columbella linigera Duclos, 1846: synonym of [unassigned] Mitromorphidae linigera (Duclos, 1846) (taxon inquirendum)
- Columbella lysidia Duclos, 1850: synonym of Monilispira lysidia (Duclos, 1850)
- Columbella macandrewi G.B. Sowerby III, 1905: synonym of Mitrella macandrewi (G.B. Sowerby III, 1905)
- Columbella mendicaria: synonym of Engina mendicaria (Linnaeus, 1758)
- Columbella mindoroensis: synonym of Mitrella mindorensis (Reeve, 1859)
- Columbella moleculina Duclos, 1846: synonym of Mitrella moleculina (Duclos, 1840)
- Columbella moleculinella Dautzenberg, 1932 : synonym of Pyreneola shepstonensis (Smith, 1910)
- Columbella nympha: synonym of Mitrella nympha (Kiener, 1841)
- Columbella ostreicola G.B. Sowerby III, 1882: synonym of Anachis ostreicola (G.B. Sowerby III, 1882)
- Columbella pacei Melvill & Standen, 1896: synonym of Anarithma stepheni (Melvill & Standen, 1897)
- Columbella pardalina Lamarck, 1822: synonym of Pardalinops testudinaria (Link, 1807)
- Columbella philippinarum Reeve, 1842 : synonym of Parametaria epamella (Duclos, 1840)
- Columbella planaxiformis G.B. Sowerby III, 1894: synonym of Mitrella bicincta (Gould, 1860)
- Columbella plexa Hedley, 1902: synonym of Retizafra plexa (Hedley, 1902)
- Columbella plutonida Duclos, 1846: synonym of Columbellopsis nycteis (Duclos, 1846)
- Columbella profundi Dall, 1889: synonym of Astyris profundi (Dall, 1889)
- Columbella pumila Dunker, 1859: synonym of Zafra pumila (Dunker, 1858)
- Columbella pupa G.B. Sowerby III, 1894: synonym of Pyreneola pupa (G.B. Sowerby III, 1894)
- Columbella pusilla Pease, 1863: synonym of Mitrella nympha (Kiener, 1841)
- Columbella regulus Souverbie, 1863: synonym of Zafra pumila (Dunker, 1858)
- Columbella richardi (Dautzenberg & Fisher, 1906): synonym of Anachis richardi (Dautzenberg & H. Fischer, 1906)
- Columbella savingyi: synonym of Zafra savignyi (Moazzo, 1939)
- Columbella semipicta G.B. Sowerby III, 1894: synonym of Pyreneola semipicta (G.B. Sowerby III, 1894)
- Columbella simplex Schepman, 1911 : synonym of Mitrella simplex (Schepman, 1911)
- Columbella stepheni Melvill & Standen, 1897: synonym of Anarithma stepheni (Melvill & Standen, 1897)
- Columbella suavis Smith, 1906 : synonym of Astyris suavis (Smith, 1906)
- Columbella sublachryma Hervier, 1900: synonym of Anarithma sublachryma (Hervier, 1900)
- Columbella terpsichore: synonym of Anachis terpsichore (G.B. Sowerby II, 1822)
- Columbella testudinaria: synonym of Pardalinops testudinaria (Link, 1807)
- Columbella tringa: synonym of Nitidella nitida (Lamarck, 1822)
- Columbella troglodytes Souverbie, 1866: synonym of Zafra troglodytes (Souverbie in Souverbie & Montrouzier, 1866)
- Columbella turturina Lamarck, 1822: synonym of Euplica turturina (Lamarck, 1822)
- Columbella uncinata G. B. Sowerby I, 1832: synonym of Microcithara uncinata (G. B. Sowerby I, 1832)
- Columbella varians Sowerby, 1832: synonym of Euplica varians (G.B. Sowerby, 1832)
- Columbella versicolor Sowerby, 1832: synonym of Euplica scripta (Lamarck, 1822)
- Columbella zebra (Wood, 1828): synonym of Anachis miser (G. B. Sowerby I, 1844)
- Columbella zonata Gould, 1860: synonym of Zafra mitriformis A. Adams, 1860

According to the Indo-Pacific Molluscan Database, the following species names are also in current use, or have become synonyms :

- Columbella perplexa Schepman, 1911
- Columbella supraplicata Smith, 1899
