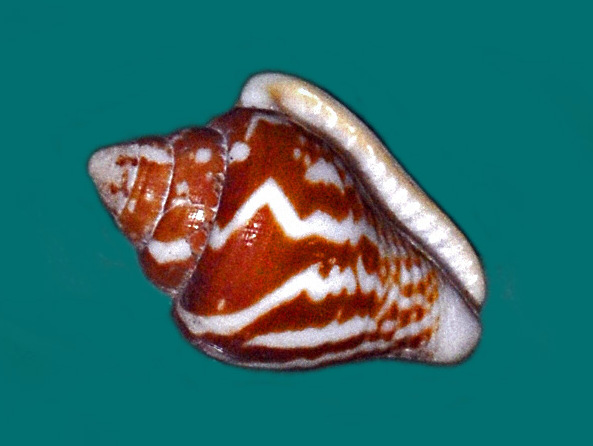
- A shell of Columbella strombiformis

Scientific classification
- Kingdom: Animalia
- Phylum: Mollusca
- Class: Gastropoda
- Subclass: Caenogastropoda
- Order: Neogastropoda
- Family: Columbellidae
- Genus: Columbella
- Species: C. strombiformis

Binomial name
- Columbella strombiformis Lamarck, 1822

Synonyms
- Buccinum strombiforme Wood, 1828; Columbella bridgesii Reeve, 1858; Columbella buccinoides Lesson, 1842

= Columbella strombiformis =

Species of gastropod

Columbella strombiformis, common name stromboid dove shell, is a species of sea snail, a marine gastropod mollusk in the family Columbellidae, the dove snails.

== Description ==
Shells of Columbella strombiformis can reach a size of 20–30 millimetres (0.79–1.18 in).

== Distribution ==
This species is present in Northern Sea of Cortèz and from Western Mexico to Peru.
