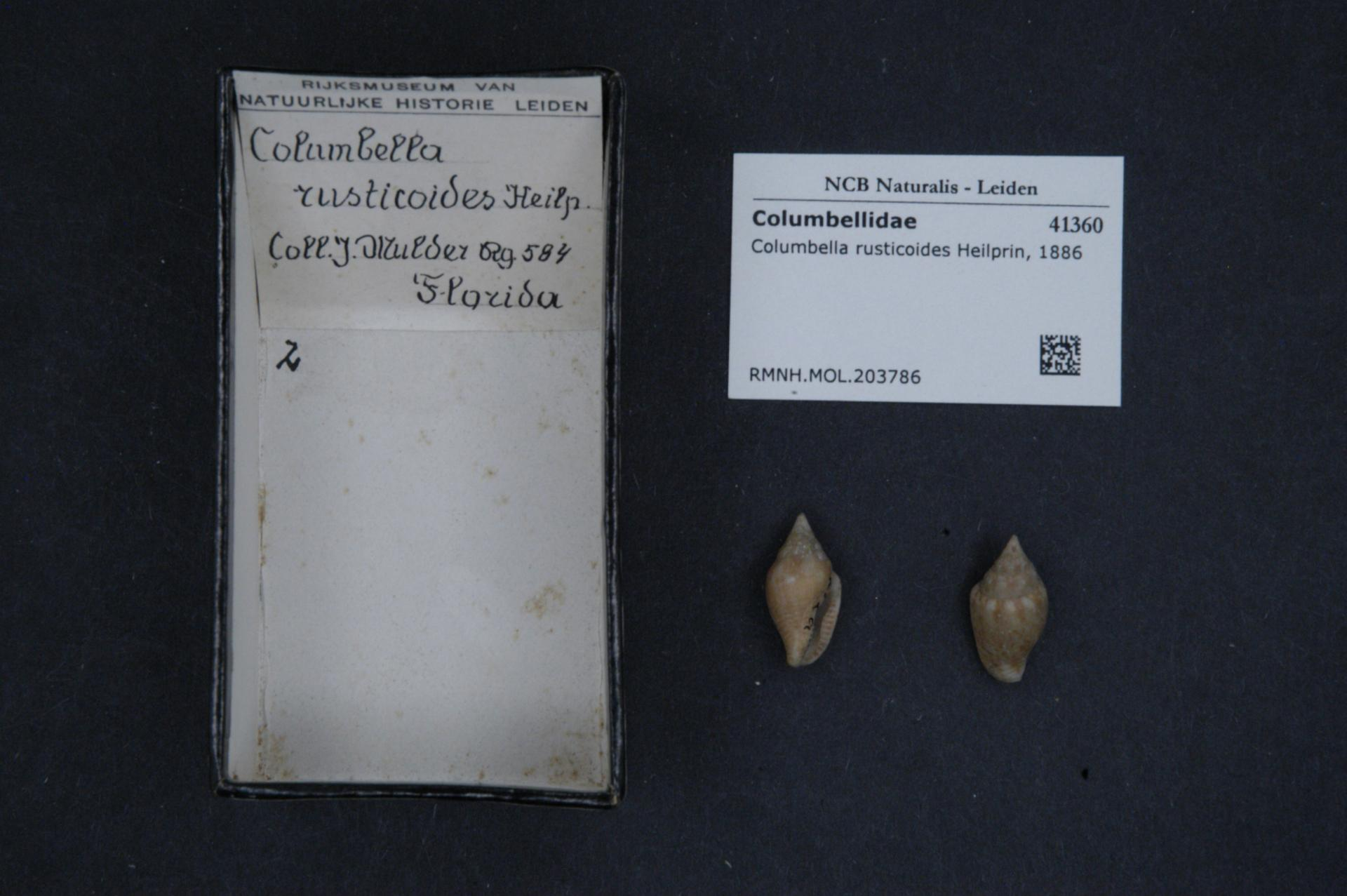

Scientific classification
- Kingdom: Animalia
- Phylum: Mollusca
- Class: Gastropoda
- Subclass: Caenogastropoda
- Order: Neogastropoda
- Family: Columbellidae
- Genus: Columbella
- Species: C. rusticoides

Binomial name
- Columbella rusticoides Heilprin, 1886

= Columbella rusticoides =

Species of gastropod

Columbella rusticoides is a species of sea snail, a marine gastropod mollusk in the family Columbellidae, the dove snails.
