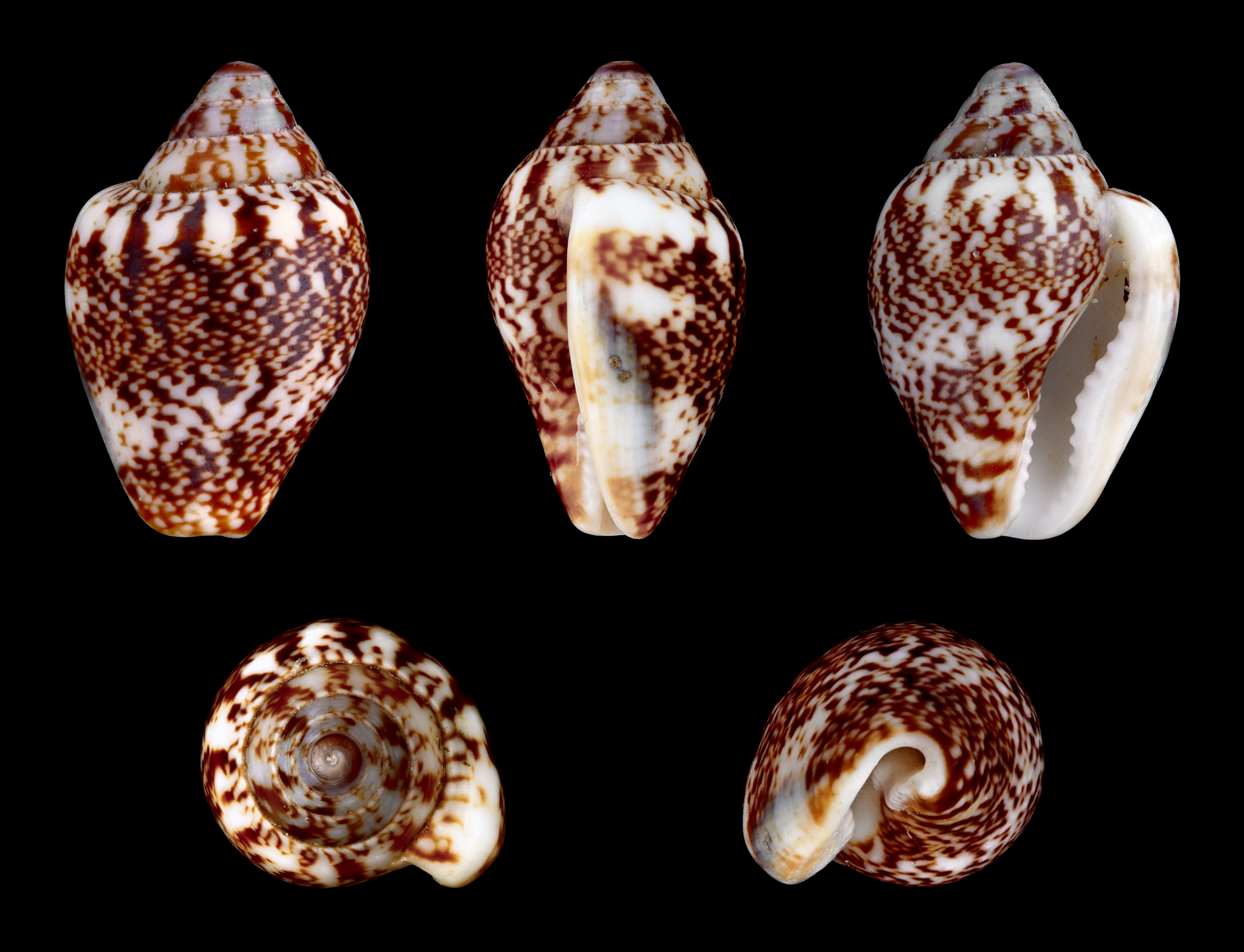
- Five views of a shell of Columbella rustica Linné, 1758

Scientific classification
- Kingdom: Animalia
- Phylum: Mollusca
- Class: Gastropoda
- Subclass: Caenogastropoda
- Order: Neogastropoda
- Family: Columbellidae
- Genus: Columbella
- Species: C. rustica

Binomial name
- Columbella rustica (Linnaeus, 1758)

Synonyms
- See list

= Columbella rustica =

Species of gastropod

Columbella rustica is a species of sea snail, a marine gastropod mollusk in the family Columbellidae, the dove snails.

== Synonyms ==
- Colombella aureola Duclos, 1846
- Colombella reticulata Lamarck, 1822
- Colombella simpronia Duclos, 1846
- Colombella spongiarum Duclos, 1840
- Colombella striata Duclos, 1840 (dubious synonym)
- Colombella tumida Duclos, 1840
- Colombella vestalia Duclos, 1846
- Colombella zulmis Duclos, 1848
- Columbella ambigua Kiener, 1840
- Columbella barbadensis d'Orbigny, 1847
- Columbella fustigata Kiener, 1841
- Columbella gualtierana Risso, 1826
- Columbella guilfordia Risso, 1826
- Columbella modesta Kiener, 1841
- Columbella procera Locard, 1886
- Columbella punctulata Risso, 1826
- Columbella rustica var. apiculata Pallary, 1900
- Columbella rustica var. cuneatiformis Pallary, 1900
- Columbella rustica var. elongata Philippi, 1836
- Columbella rustica var. lactea Monterosato, 1875
- Columbella rustica var. lutea Pallary, 1900
- Columbella rustica var. major Pallary, 1900
- Columbella rustica var. marmorata Monterosato, 1878
- Columbella rustica var. minima Bucquoy, Dautzenberg & Dollfus, 1882
- Columbella rustica var. minor Pallary, 1900
- Columbella rustica var. obesula Pallary, 1900
- Columbella rustica var. syriaca Coen, 1933
- Columbella rustica var. syriaca Monterosato, 1899
- Columbella rustica var. trigonostoma Pallary, 1920
- Columbella striata Duclos, 1840
- Columbella striata Menke, 1829
- Pyrene rustica (Linnaeus, 1758)
- Voluta punctata T. Allan, 1818
- Voluta rustica Linnaeus, 1758 (original combination)
- Voluta tringa Linnaeus, 1758
