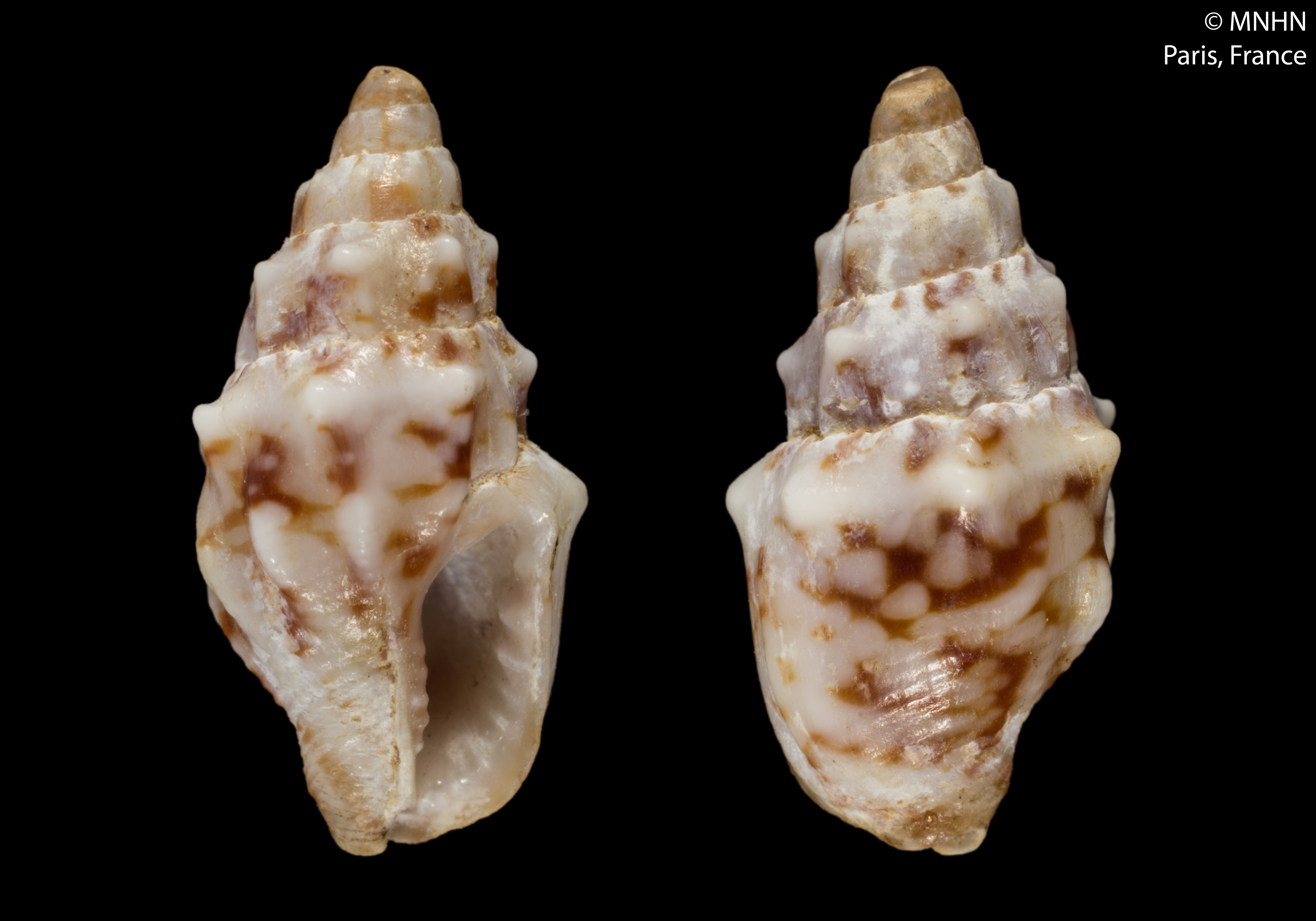
- Shell of Anachis coronata (syntype at MNHN, Paris)

Scientific classification
- Kingdom: Animalia
- Phylum: Mollusca
- Class: Gastropoda
- Subclass: Caenogastropoda
- Order: Neogastropoda
- Family: Columbellidae
- Genus: Anachis
- Species: A. coronata

Binomial name
- Anachis coronata (G. B. Sowerby I, 1832)

Synonyms
- Anachis coronata coronata (G. B. Sowerby I, 1832) (original combination); Colombella sowerbyi Duclos, 1848; Columbella coronata G. B. Sowerby I, 1832 (original combination); Columbella sugillata Reeve, 1859

= Anachis coronata =

Species of gastropod

Anachis coronata is a species of sea snail in the family Columbellidae, the dove snails.

Subspecies

- Anachis coronata hannana Hertlein & A. M. Strong, 1951

== Description ==
The length of the shell attains 5.5 mm.

(Described by P.P. Carpenter) The specimens differ not a little from the type and among themselves. Some specimens are slender, acuminate, with the tubercles changed into ribs, except the last few. In these, the ribs are very numerous and fine. Two others have more the typical shape of Anachis varia, with the ribs further apart, and in front slightly tubercular. They are known from the previous species by the smoothness of the upper whorls. The inside of the outer lip is more finely toothed (the denticles run into grooves), and is often richly stained. The painting is very fine; brownish purple pencilings on a light ground.

== Distribution ==
This species occurs in the Gulf of California and in the Pacific Ocean off Mexico and Panama
