= Columbella marrae =

Scientific classification
- Kingdom: Animalia
- Phylum: Mollusca
- Class: Gastropoda
- Subclass: Caenogastropoda
- Order: Neogastropoda
- Family: Columbellidae
- Genus: Columbella
- Species: C. marrae

Binomial name
- Columbella marrae Garcia E., 1999

Species of gastropod

Columbella marrae is a species of sea snail, a marine gastropod mollusk in the family Columbellidae, the dove snails.
