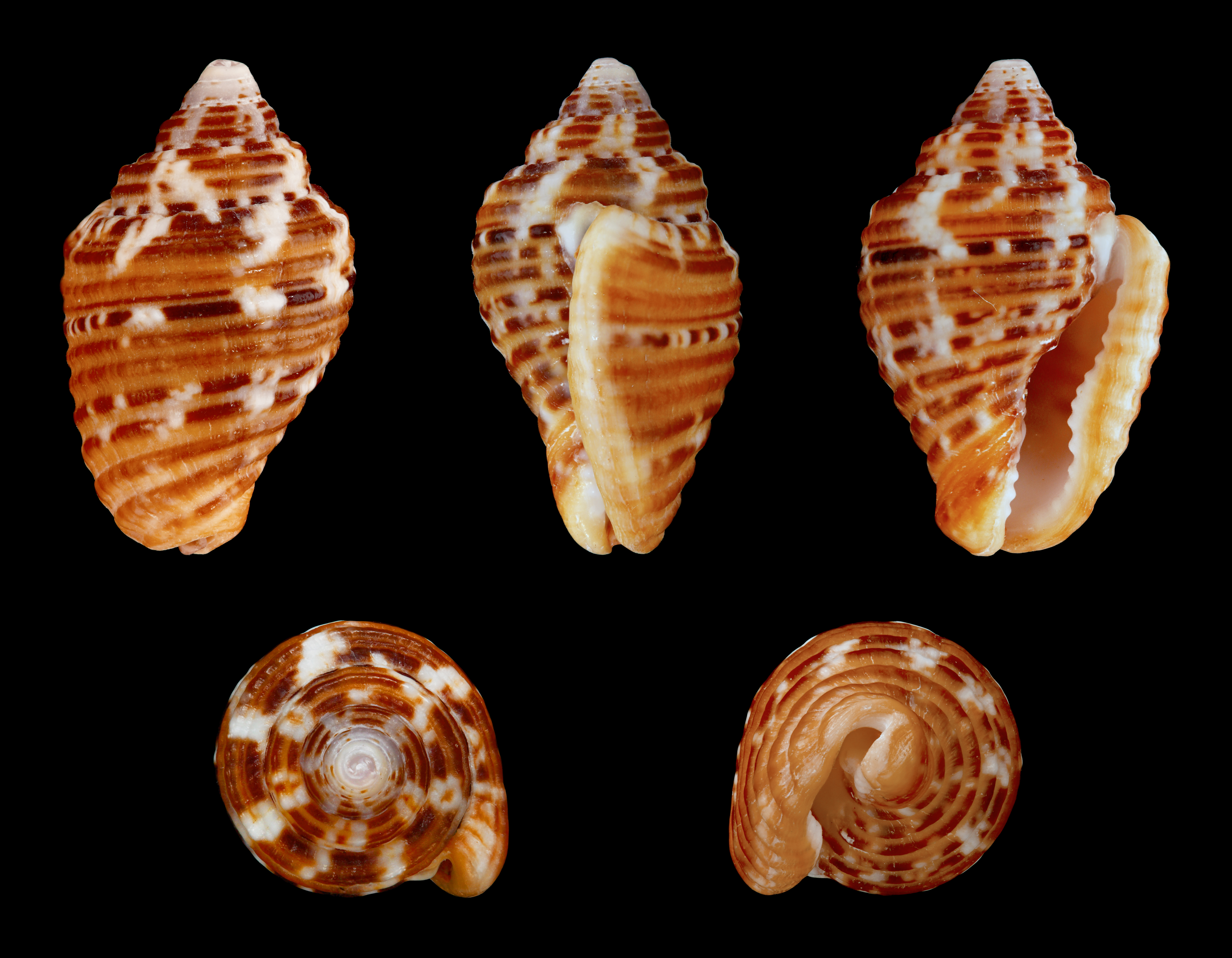
- Five views of a shell of Columbella mercatoria (Linné, 1758)

Scientific classification
- Kingdom: Animalia
- Phylum: Mollusca
- Class: Gastropoda
- Subclass: Caenogastropoda
- Order: Neogastropoda
- Family: Columbellidae
- Genus: Columbella
- Species: C. mercatoria

Binomial name
- Columbella mercatoria (Linnaeus, 1758)

Synonyms
- Columbella affinis Risso, 1826; Columbella mercatoria elongata Usticke, 1959; Columbella mercatoria mercatoria (Linnaeus, 1758); Columbella mercatoria var. scalaris Kobelt, 1897; Columbella peleei Kiener, 1841; Columbella rudis G. B. Sowerby I, 1844; Columbella somersiana Dall & Bartsch, 1911; Columbella variabilis Schumacher, 1817; Voluta mercatoria Linnaeus, 1758 (original combination)

= Columbella mercatoria =

Species of gastropod

Columbella mercatoria is a species of sea snail, a marine gastropod mollusk in the family Columbellidae, the dove snails.

== Description ==
The length of the shell attains 14.6 mm.
