= Columbella costa =

Scientific classification
- Kingdom: Animalia
- Phylum: Mollusca
- Class: Gastropoda
- Subclass: Caenogastropoda
- Order: Neogastropoda
- Family: Columbellidae
- Genus: Columbella
- Species: C. costa

Binomial name
- Columbella costa Simone, 2007

Species of gastropod

Columbella costa is a species of sea snail, a marine gastropod mollusc in the family Columbellidae, the dove snails.
