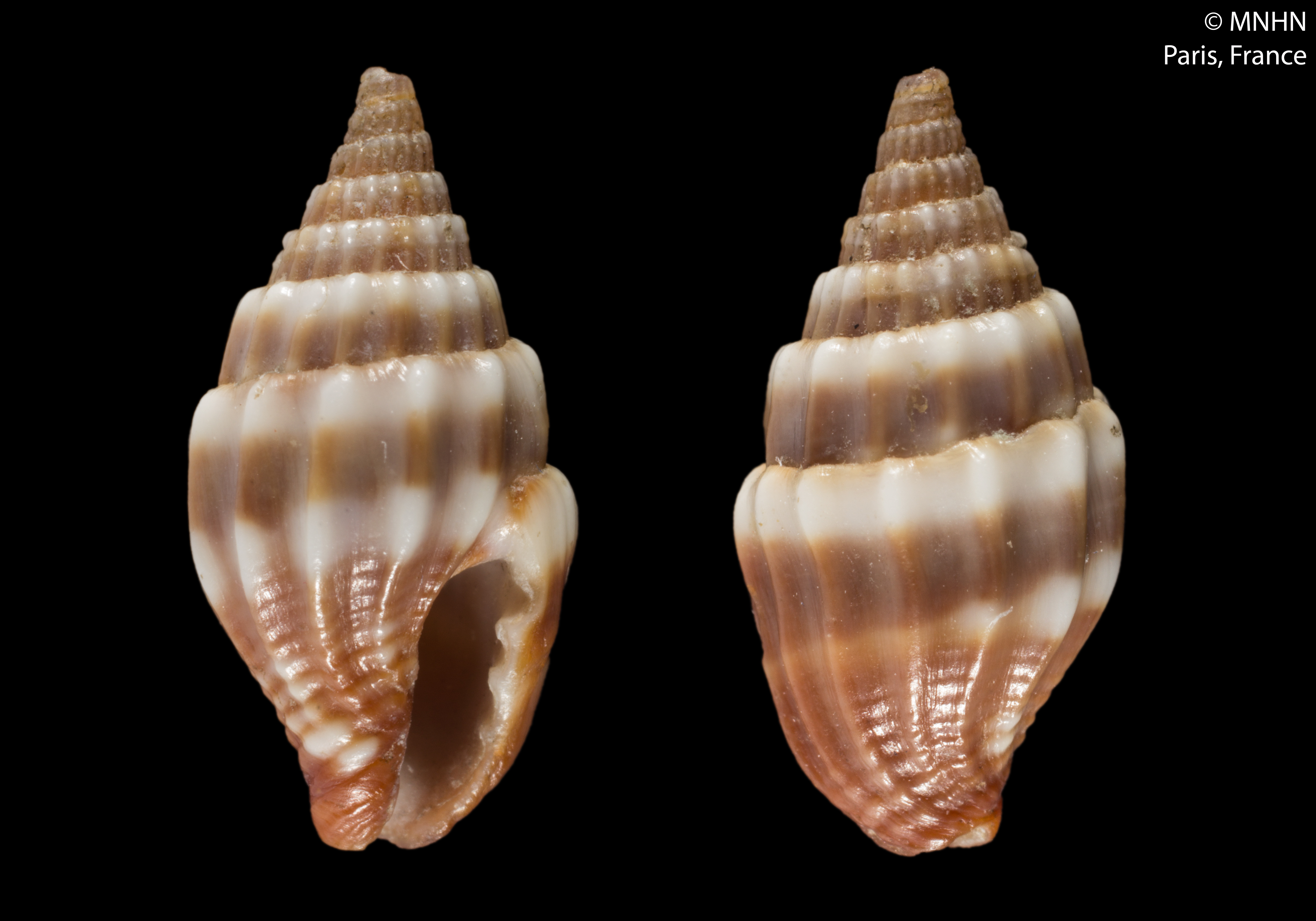
- Shell of Anachis scalarina (syntype at MNHN, Paris)

Scientific classification
- Kingdom: Animalia
- Phylum: Mollusca
- Class: Gastropoda
- Subclass: Caenogastropoda
- Order: Neogastropoda
- Family: Columbellidae
- Genus: Anachis
- Species: A. scalarina

Binomial name
- Anachis scalarina (G. B. Sowerby I, 1832)

Synonyms
- Anachis costellata var. pachyderma P. P. Carpenter, 1857; Colombella yoldina Duclos, 1840; Columbella cavea Reeve, 1859; Columbella scalarina G. B. Sowerby I, 1832 (original combination)

= Anachis scalarina =

Species of gastropod

Anachis scalarina is a species of sea snail in the family Columbellidae, the dove snails.

== Description ==
The length of the shell attains 21 mm.

(Described by P.P. Carpenter) The character of the epidermis can be relied upon, which is very thin, rather deciduous, with a very few fine ridges of growth. It is further distinguished from all the varieties of Anachis costellata by its large size, very regular, somewhat inflated growth, sharp, continued ribs cancellated over the whole surface, and strong teeth on the upper portion of the outer lip. The color is principally brown with a white band below the suture. The young shell has a distinct, somewhat bent siphonal canal.

== Distribution ==
This species occurs in the Gulf of California and in the Pacific Ocean off Mexico and Panama
