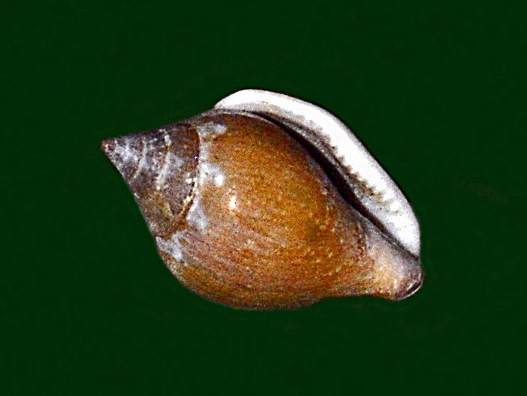
- A shell of Columbella fuscata

Scientific classification
- Kingdom: Animalia
- Phylum: Mollusca
- Class: Gastropoda
- Subclass: Caenogastropoda
- Order: Neogastropoda
- Family: Columbellidae
- Genus: Columbella
- Species: C. fuscata

Binomial name
- Columbella fuscata Sowerby I, 1832

Synonyms
- Columbella fuscata var. pallescens Wimmer, 1880; Columbella luteola Kiener, 1841; Columbella meleagris Duclos, 1840; Columbella nodalina Duclos, 1840; Columbella vulpecula Duclos, 1846

= Columbella fuscata =

Species of gastropod

Columbella fuscata, the burnt dove shell, is a species of sea snail, a marine gastropod mollusk in the family Columbellidae, the dove snails.

== Description ==
Shells of Columbella fuscata can reach a size of 11–22 millimetres (0.43–0.87 in).

== Distribution ==
This species is present in Baja California, from Mexico to Peru and in the Galápagos.

== Bibliography ==
- Monsecour K. (2010). Checklist of Columbellidae.
- Petit, R. E. (2009). George Brettingham Sowerby, I, II & III: their conchological publications and molluscan taxa. Zootaxa. 2189: 1–218.
- R S Houston - THE STRUCTURE AND FUNCTION OF NEOGASTROPOD REPRODUCTIVE SYSTEMS WITH SPECIAL REFERENCE TO Columbella-fuscata - Veliger 1976 19:27-46
