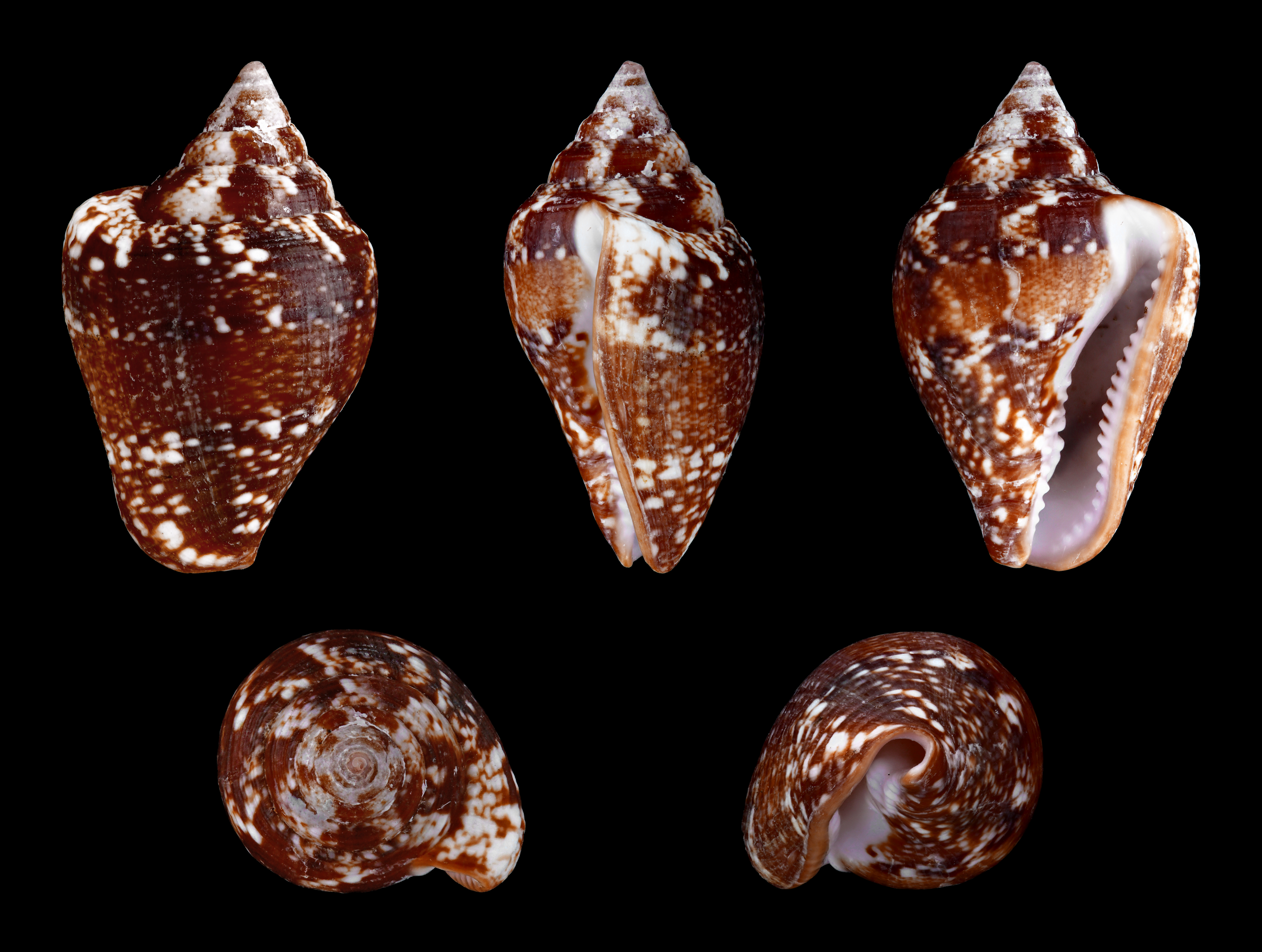
- Five views of a shell of Columbella adansoni Menke, 1853

Scientific classification
- Kingdom: Animalia
- Phylum: Mollusca
- Class: Gastropoda
- Subclass: Caenogastropoda
- Order: Neogastropoda
- Family: Columbellidae
- Genus: Columbella
- Species: C. adansoni

Binomial name
- Columbella adansoni Menke, 1853

= Columbella adansoni =

Species of gastropod

Columbella adansoni is a species of sea snail, a marine gastropod mollusk in the family Columbellidae, the dove snails.
