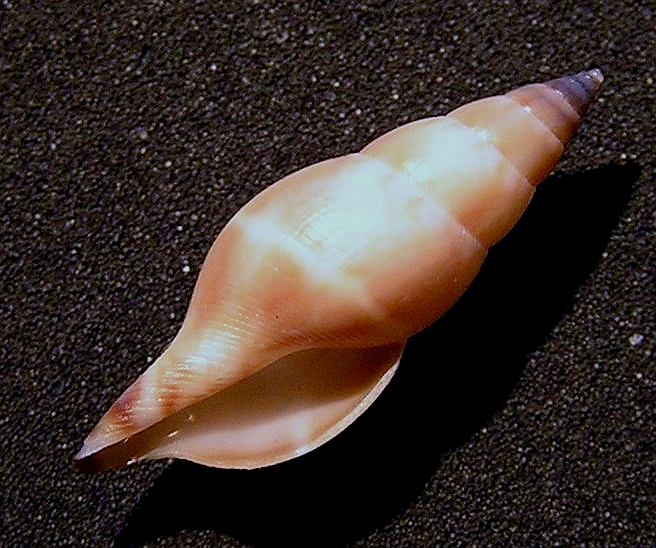
- Apertural view of a shell of Indomitrella conspersa

Scientific classification
- Kingdom: Animalia
- Phylum: Mollusca
- Class: Gastropoda
- Subclass: Caenogastropoda
- Order: Neogastropoda
- Superfamily: Buccinoidea
- Family: Columbellidae
- Genus: Indomitrella; Oostingh, 1940

Type species
- Columbella puella G.B. Sowerby I, 1844

Synonyms
- Mitrella (Indomitrella) Oostingh, 1940

= Indomitrella =

Genus of gastropods

Indomitrella is a genus of sea snails, marine gastropod mollusks in the family Columbellidae, the dove snails.

== Species ==
- within the genus Indomitrella include :
- † Indomitrella acuticonica Harzhauser, Raven & Landau, 2018
- Indomitrella concalis K. Monsecour & D. Monsecour, 2016
- Indomitrella conspersa (Gaskoin, 1851)
- Indomitrella drivasi K. Monsecour & D. Monsecour, 2016
- Indomitrella erronea K. Monsecour & D. Monsecour, 2016
- Indomitrella exsanguis K. Monsecour & D. Monsecour, 2016
- Indomitrella haziersensis Drivas & Jay, 1990
- † Indomitrella mawsoni (Ladd, 1972)
- Indomitrella puella (G. B. Sowerby I, 1844)
- Indomitrella schepmani (K. Monsecour & D. Monsecour, 2007)
- Indomitrella strongae K. Monsecour & D. Monsecour, 2016

* brought into synonymy

- Indomitrella kilburni Drivas & Jay, 1990: synonym of Mitrella spiratella (Martens, 1880)
