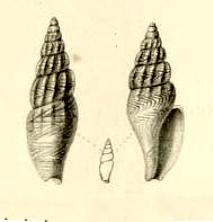
- Original image of a shell of Anachis kraussii

Scientific classification
- Kingdom: Animalia
- Phylum: Mollusca
- Class: Gastropoda
- Subclass: Caenogastropoda
- Order: Neogastropoda
- Family: Columbellidae
- Genus: Anachis
- Species: A. kraussii

Binomial name
- Anachis kraussii (G.B. Sowerby I, 1844)

Synonyms
- List: Anachis kraussi [sic] (misspelling); Anachis kraussii f. io Bartsch, 1915; Buccinum cereale Krauss, 1848; Columbella alfredensis Bartsch, 1915; Columbella cerealis Reeve, 1859; Columbella fulminea Gould, 1860; Columbella helena Turton, 1932; Columbella io Bartsch, 1915; Columbella kraussi G.B. Sowerby I, 1844 (basionym); Columbella kraussi kraussi Turton, 1932; Columbella kraussi var. albanyana Turton, 1932; Pleurotoma fulgurans Krauss, 1848; Pleurotoma (Mangelia) fulgurans F. Krauss, 1848· accepted, alternate representation; Pyrene kraussi (Sowerby I, 1844); Raphitoma fulgurans (Krauss, 1848)

= Anachis kraussii =

Species of gastropod

Anachis kraussii is a species of sea snail in the family Columbellidae, the dove snails.

== Subspecies ==
- Anachis kraussii kitchingi (Sowerby III, 1894)
- Anachis kraussii kraussii (Sowerby I, 1844)

== Description ==
The shell size varies between 5 mm and 8 mm

The small, elongated-tuureted shell has a short spire and an acute apex. The color of the shell is white, adorned with red angulate bands. The shell contains 8 convex whorls with longitudinal plicate ribs (11 obtuse ribs in the penultimate whorl). The suture is simple. The oblique interstices are smooth. The body whorl is subcostate. The base of the shell is transversely striated. The white aperture is ovate, becoming blunt at the top. The outer lip is sharp and smooth inside. The siphonal canal is short.

== Distribution ==
This marine species occurs off Southwest and Southeast Africa.
