= Mitrella erythraeensis =

Scientific classification
- Kingdom: Animalia
- Phylum: Mollusca
- Class: Gastropoda
- Subclass: Caenogastropoda
- Order: Neogastropoda
- Family: Columbellidae
- Genus: Mitrella
- Species: M. erythraeensis

Binomial name
- Mitrella erythraeensis (Sturany, 1900)

Synonyms
- Columbella (Mitrella) erythraeensis Sturany, 1900; Columbella erythraeensis Sturany, 1900

Species of gastropod

Mitrella erythraeensis is a species of sea snail, a marine gastropod mollusk in the family Columbellidae, the dove snails.
