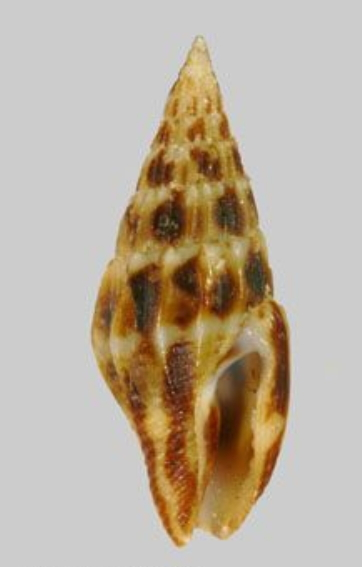
- Shell of Anachis vexillum (specimen at the Natural History Museum Rotterdam)

Scientific classification
- Kingdom: Animalia
- Phylum: Mollusca
- Class: Gastropoda
- Subclass: Caenogastropoda
- Order: Neogastropoda
- Family: Columbellidae
- Genus: Anachis
- Species: A. vexillum

Binomial name
- Anachis vexillum (Reeve, 1858)

Synonyms
- Columbella costellata G. B. Sowerby I, 1832 (not Broderip & Sowerby I, 1829); Columbella multivoluta Reeve, 1859; Columbella vexillum Reeve, 1858 (original combination)

= Anachis vexillum =

Species of gastropod

Anachis vexillum, common name the flag columbella, is a species of sea snail in the family Columbellidae, the dove snails.

== Description ==
(Original description) The shell is acuminately oblong and somewhat turreted, appearing yellowish and conspicuously striped longitudinally with dark-brown. It features eight whorls, which are somewhat swollen at the upper part and are longitudinally ribbed. The body whorl is concavely contracted. The aperture is small, and its interior is bluish.

== Distribution ==
This species is found in the Gulf of California , Mexico.
