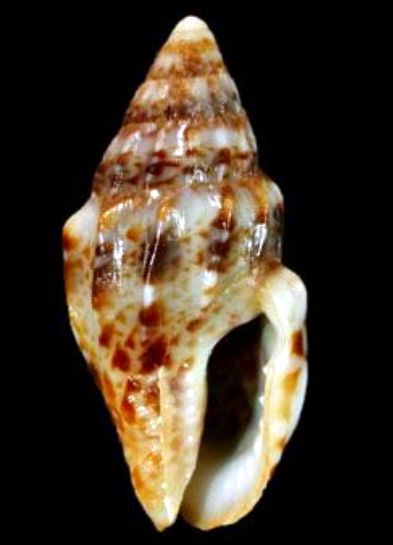
- Shell of Anachis costellata (specimen at the Natural History Museum Rotterdam)

Scientific classification
- Kingdom: Animalia
- Phylum: Mollusca
- Class: Gastropoda
- Subclass: Caenogastropoda
- Order: Neogastropoda
- Family: Columbellidae
- Genus: Anachis
- Species: A. costellata

Binomial name
- Anachis costellata (Broderip & G. B. Sowerby I, 1829)

Synonyms
- Columbella costellata Broderip & G. B. Sowerby I, 1829 (original combination)

= Anachis costellata =

Species of gastropod

Anachis costellata is a species of sea snail in the family Columbellidae, the dove snails.

The variety Anachis costellata var. pachyderma P. P. Carpenter, 1857 is a synonym of Anachis scalarina (G. B. Sowerby I, 1832)

== Description ==
The length of the shell attains 15 mm.

(Described by P.P. Carpenter) The Mazatlán shells divide themselves with tolerable accuracy into two sets: the one is characterized by a coarse lamellar epidermis, while the other has one that is very thin, smooth, or rarely scaly, closely adherent, and displays the rich chestnut color of the shell. They differ from Anachis scalarina in their very much smaller size, chestnut markings, flattened whorls, and the adherence of the epidermis.

Distinguishing Features: Should the epidermal differences prove constant, they may be the best characters to recognize the species, as the features recorded by Sowerby I are subject to great variation. The decussation of the interspaces is generally only seen on the spire in the young shell; the spiral striae at the base are sufficiently conspicuous.

== Distribution ==
This species occurs in the Gulf of California and in the Pacific Ocean off Mexico, Panama and Ecuador.
