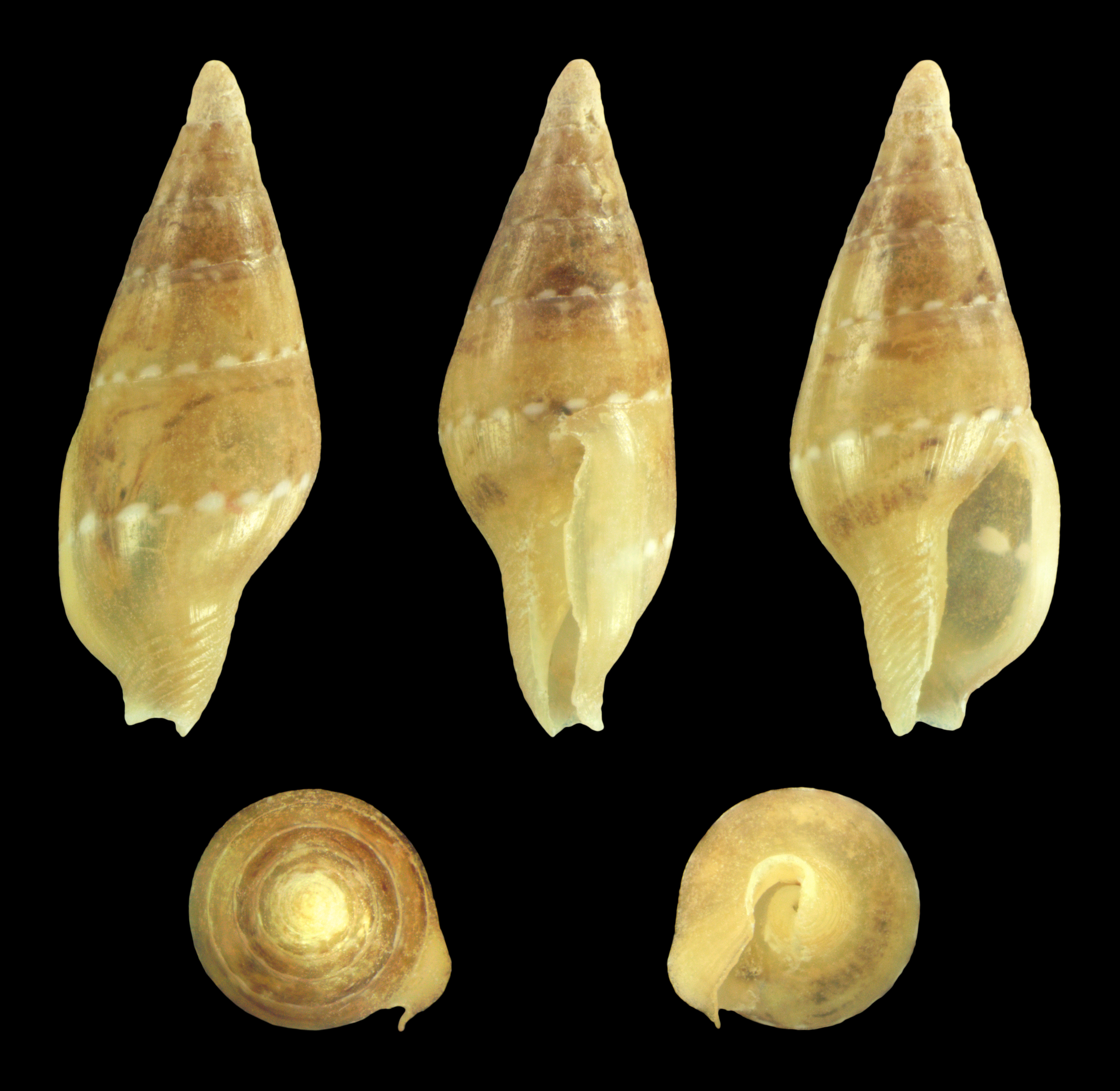

Scientific classification
- Kingdom: Animalia
- Phylum: Mollusca
- Class: Gastropoda
- Subclass: Caenogastropoda
- Order: Neogastropoda
- Family: Columbellidae
- Genus: Mitrella
- Species: M. fimbriata

Binomial name
- Mitrella fimbriata (Reeve, 1846)

Synonyms
- Columbella eximia Reeve, 1846

= Mitrella eximia =

Species of gastropod

Mitrella eximia is a species of sea snail in the family Columbellidae, the dove snails.

== Description ==
The shell size varies between 6 mm and 12 mm.

== Distribution ==
This species is found in the Red Sea and along Malaysia and the Philippines
