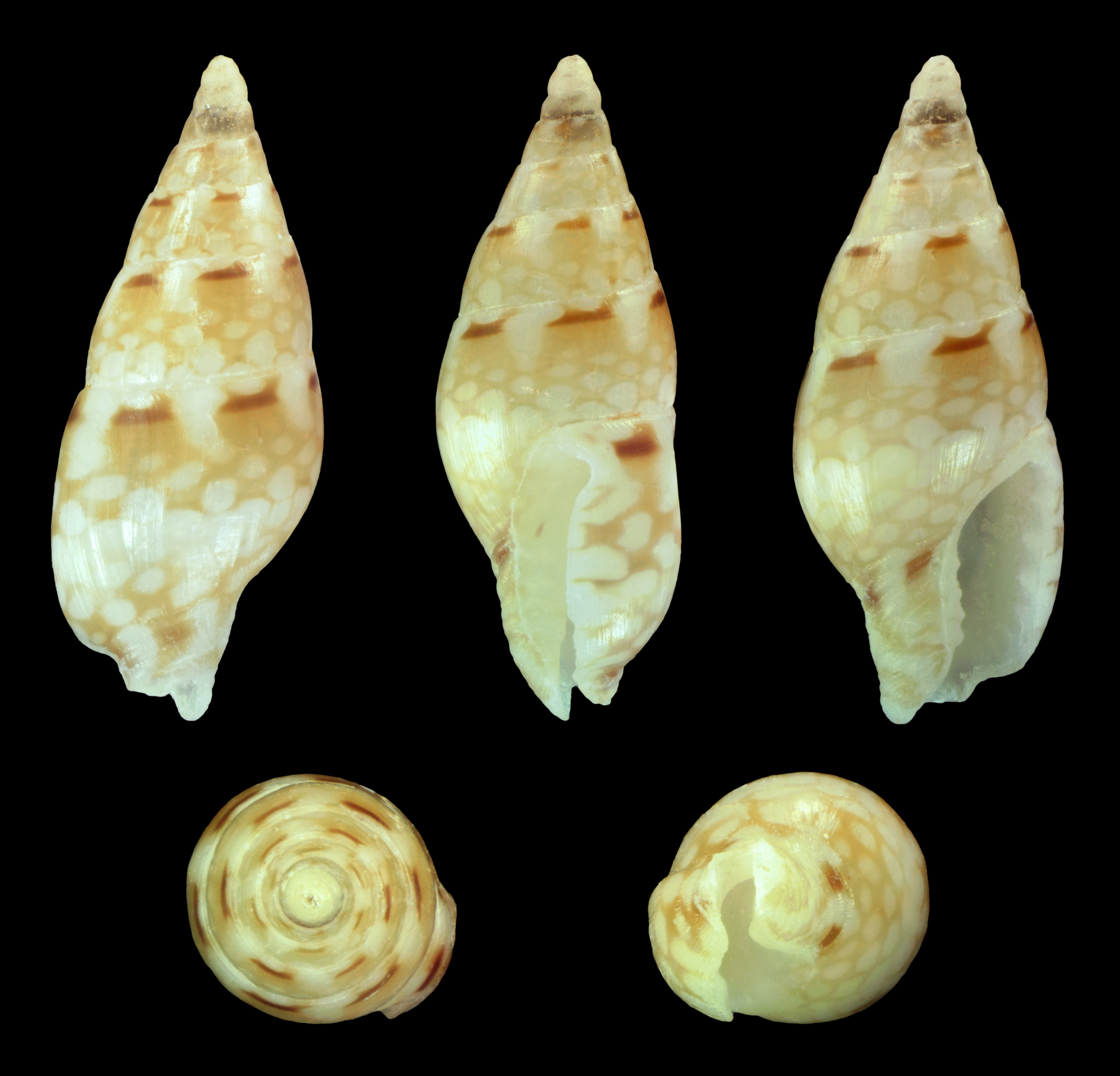
- Shell of Mitrella moleculina

Scientific classification
- Kingdom: Animalia
- Phylum: Mollusca
- Class: Gastropoda
- Subclass: Caenogastropoda
- Order: Neogastropoda
- Family: Columbellidae
- Genus: Mitrella
- Species: M. moleculina

Binomial name
- Mitrella moleculina (Duclos, 1846)

Synonyms
- Anachis (Nitidella) moleculina (Duclos, 1840); Anachis moleculina (Duclos, 1840); Columbella inscripta Brazier, 1877; Columbella moleculina Duclos, 1835 (basionym); Pyrene moleculina (Duclos, 1840)

= Mitrella moleculina =

Species of gastropod

Mitrella moleculina is a species of sea snail, a marine gastropod mollusk in the family Columbellidae, the dove snails. This species occurs in the Indian Ocean off Aldabra and Madagascar and in the seas off the Philippines, Korea, Taiwan, and Japan. The shell ranges between 6 and 9 millimeters in length.

Mitrella moleculina are broadcast spawners, releasing their gametes (sperm and eggs) into open water for external fertilisation.

== Distribution ==
Pacific Ocean: Australia.

== Description ==
This species attains a size of 8 mm.
