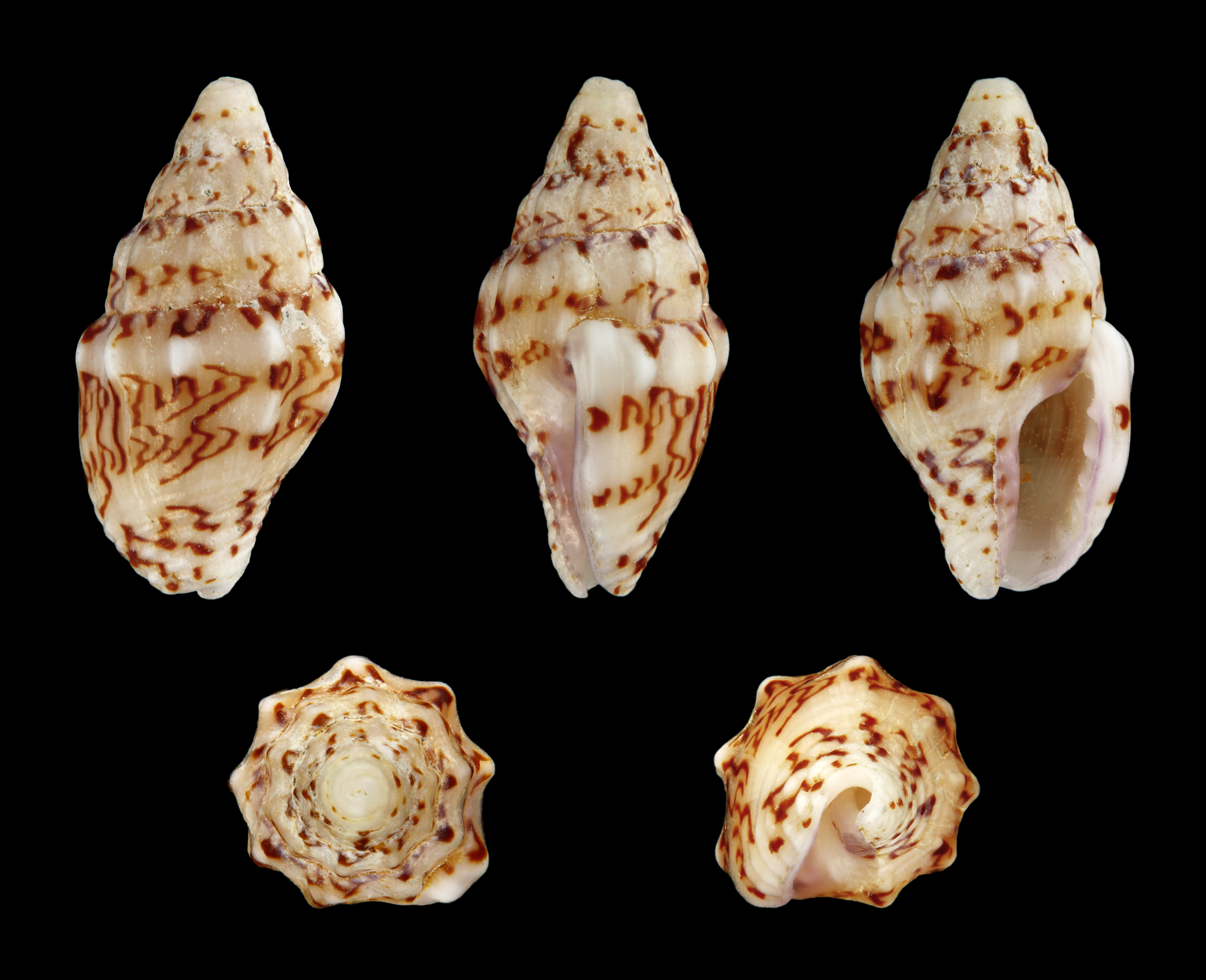

Scientific classification
- Kingdom: Animalia
- Phylum: Mollusca
- Class: Gastropoda
- Subclass: Caenogastropoda
- Order: Neogastropoda
- Family: Columbellidae
- Genus: Anachis
- Species: A. terpsichore

Binomial name
- Anachis terpsichore (G.B. Sowerby I, 1822)

Synonyms
- † Buccinum junghuhni K. Martin, 1879 †; Columbella californica Reeve, 1859; Columbella lineolata Kiener, 1841; Columbella terpsichore G.B. Sowerby I, 1822 (basionym); Columbella terpsichore var. kieneri Martens, 1897; † Columella (Anachis) fritschi O. Boettger, 1883 junior subjective synonym

= Anachis terpsichore =

Species of gastropod

Anachis terpsichore is a species of sea snail in the family Columbellidae, the dove snails.

== Description ==
Their shell size varies between 10 mm and 20 mm.

== Distribution ==
This species is found in the Red Sea and off India and Sri Lanka.
