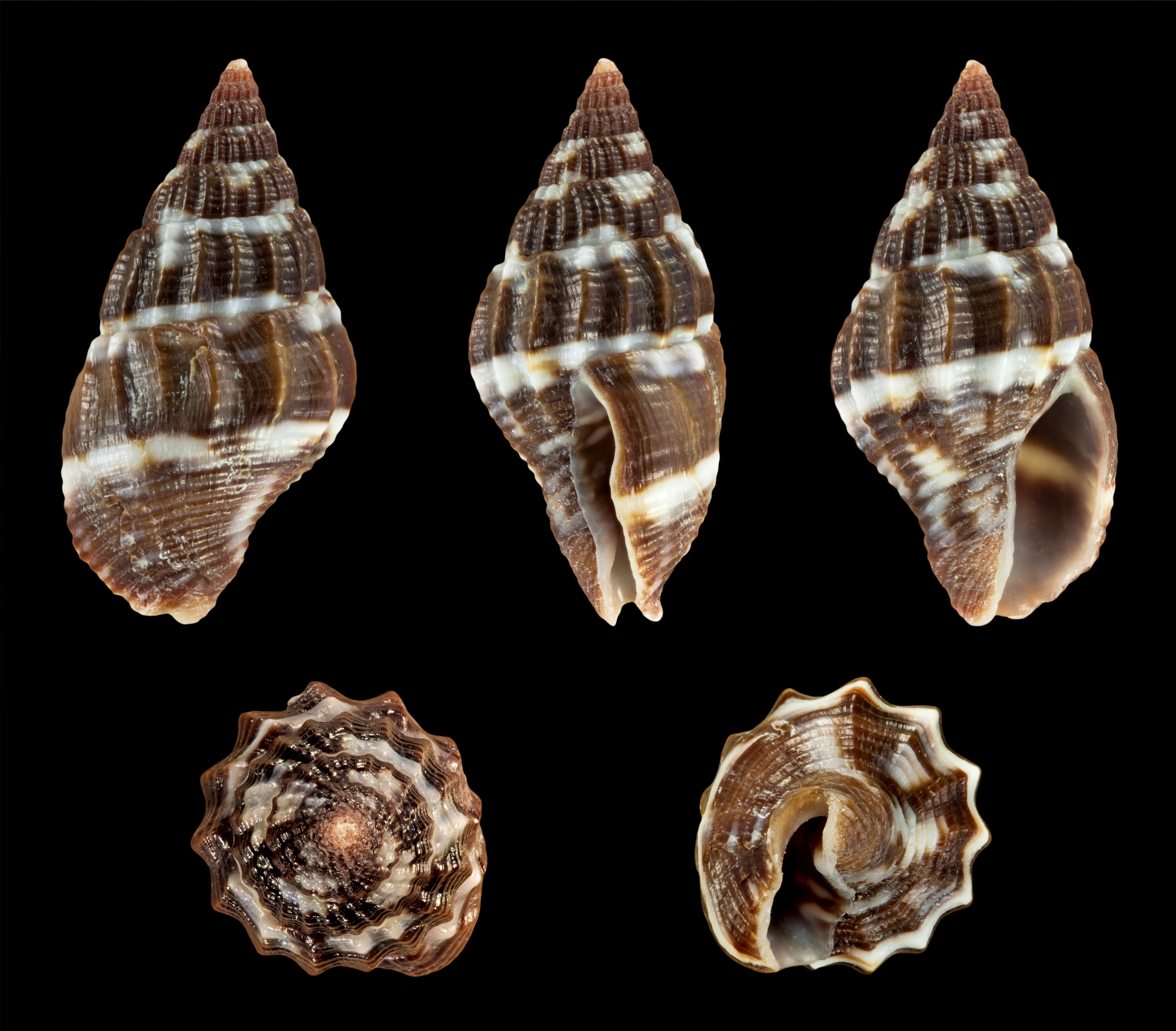
- Shell of Anachis varia

Scientific classification
- Kingdom: Animalia
- Phylum: Mollusca
- Class: Gastropoda
- Subclass: Caenogastropoda
- Order: Neogastropoda
- Family: Columbellidae
- Genus: Anachis
- Species: A. varia

Binomial name
- Anachis varia (G. B. Sowerby I, 1832)

Synonyms
- Buccinum floridanum A. Lesson, 1842; Columbella encaustica Reeve, 1858 ·; Columbella varia G. B. Sowerby I, 1832 (original combination); Costoanachis varia (G. B. Sowerby I, 1832) ·

= Anachis varia =

Species of gastropod

Anachis varia is a species of sea snail in the family Columbellidae, the dove snails.

== Description ==
(Original description in Latin) The shell is oblong and decussately-ribbed, with an acuminated (pointed) apex. The 8-9 whorls are brownish, variegated with whitish. They are longitudinally ribbed, with the spaces between the ribs being grooved. The aperture is suboval. The outer lip's thickened exterior margin is emarginated on its upper part.

== Distribution ==
This species occurs off Gulf of California and in the Pacific Ocean off Costa Rica, Panama and Ecuador
