= Mitrella nycteis =

Scientific classification
- Kingdom: Animalia
- Phylum: Mollusca
- Class: Gastropoda
- Subclass: Caenogastropoda
- Order: Neogastropoda
- Family: Columbellidae
- Genus: Mitrella
- Species: M. nycteis

Binomial name
- Mitrella nycteis (Duclos, 1846)

Synonyms
- List: Colombella belizana Duclos, 1848; Colombella fusiformis d'Orbigny, 1845; Colombella nycteis Duclos, 1846; Colombella plutonida Duclos, 1846; Columbella fenestrata C.B. Adams, 1850; Columbella fusiformis d'Orbigny, 1842; Columbella sagitta Gaskoin, 1851; Columbellopsis nycteis (Duclos, 1846)

Species of gastropod

Mitrella nycteis, commonly known as the fenestrate dove shell, is a species of sea snail, a marine gastropod mollusk in the family Columbellidae, the dove snails.

== Description ==
The shell size is up to 8 mm.

== Distribution ==
This species is distributed in the Indian Ocean along Madagascar and in the Caribbean Sea, the West Indies and in the Gulf of Mexico.
