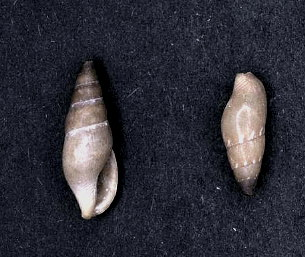
- Two views of a shell of Mitrella gervillii

Scientific classification
- Kingdom: Animalia
- Phylum: Mollusca
- Class: Gastropoda
- Subclass: Caenogastropoda
- Order: Neogastropoda
- Family: Columbellidae
- Genus: Mitrella
- Species: M. gervillii

Binomial name
- Mitrella gervillii (Payraudeau, 1826)

Synonyms
- List: Buccinum gervillii (Payraudeau, 1826); Columbella achatina G.B. Sowerby I, 1844; Columbella acuta Kobelt, 1895; Columbella crossiana Récluz, 1851; Columbella decollata Brusina, 1865; Columbella gervillei [sic] (misspelling); Columbella gervillei var. angusta di Monterosato, 1878; Columbella gervillei var. obesula Monterosato, 1878; Columbella gervillei var. rubra Monterosato, 1878; Columbella gervillei var. unicolor Monterosato, 1878; Columbella gervillei var. variegata Monterosato, 1878; Mitra gervillei Payraudeau, 1826 (basionym); Mitra gervillii var. aurea Coen, 1933; Mitrella decollata (Brusina, 1865); Mitrella decollata var. caralitana Schiro, 1978; Mitrella gervillei [sic] (misspelling); Mitrella gervillei gervillei [sic] (misspelling)

= Mitrella gervillii =

Species of gastropod

Mitrella gervillii is a species of sea snail in the family Columbellidae, the dove snails.

== Description ==
The length of the shell varies between 10 mm and 20 mm.

The thick shell is smooth, narrow, elongated, and subturreted. It is formed of eight or nine slightly distinct roundish whorls. It is of a fawn color or more or less deep brownish red. It contains some white spots, forming a sort of zone beneath the sutures. It presents also several varieties of color, and some specimens are found which are covered with small grayish points. The whitish aperture is delicately shaded with a pale violet, rather small, narrow, terminated by a straight siphonal canal, short, and very slightly effuse at its extremity. The outer lip is thin and sharp. Its internal edge isdenticulated. The columella lip is covered in front by a pointed callosity, which partially conceals the striae of the base of the body whorl and exhibits a row of five or six small guttules. Sometimes these do not exist.

== Distribution ==
This marine species occurs in European waters, off Spain and Portugal, and in the Mediterranean Sea (off Greece)
