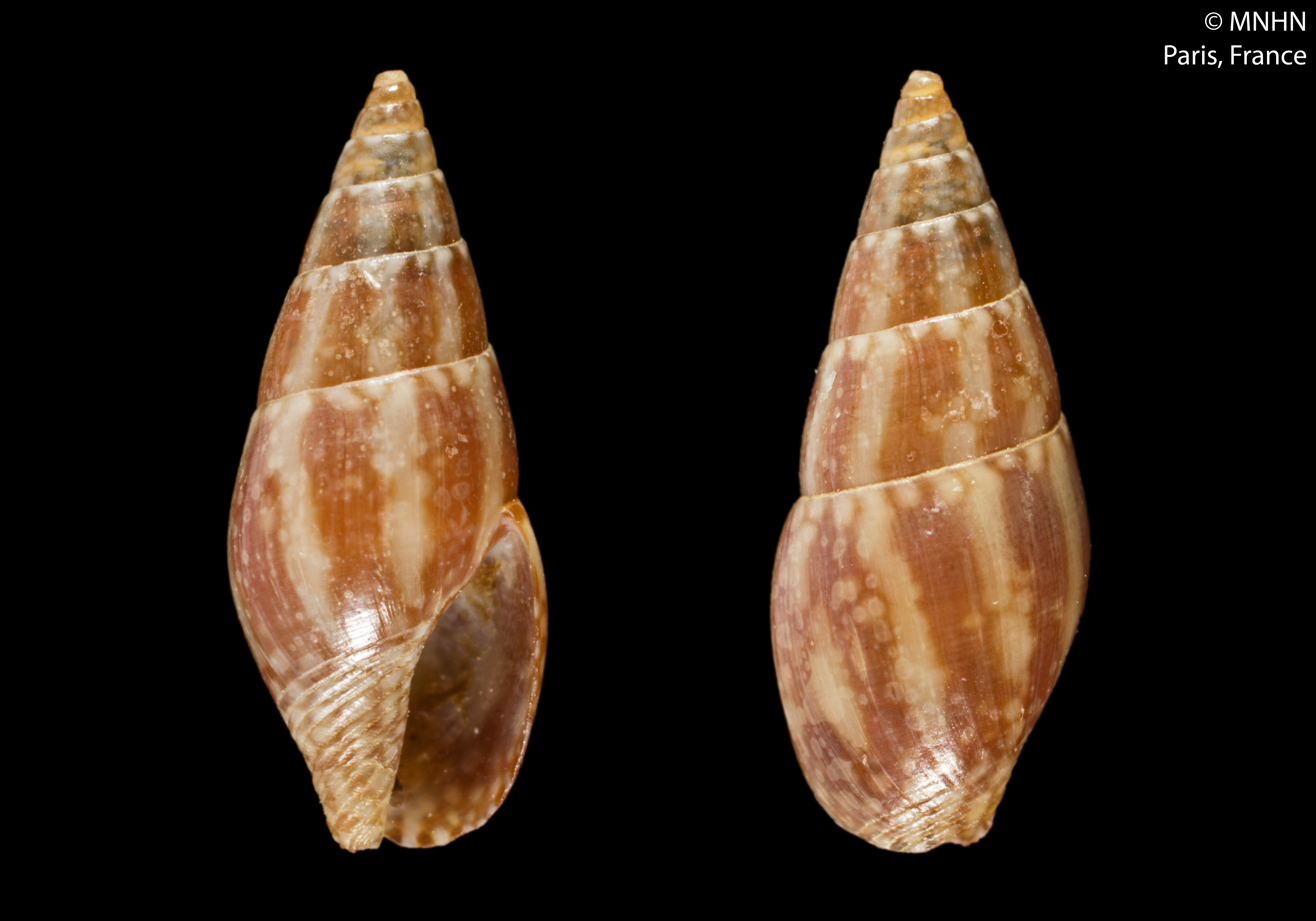
- Shell of Mitrella dichroa (syntype at MNHN, Paris)

Scientific classification
- Kingdom: Animalia
- Phylum: Mollusca
- Class: Gastropoda
- Subclass: Caenogastropoda
- Order: Neogastropoda
- Family: Columbellidae
- Genus: Mitrella
- Species: M. dichroa

Binomial name
- Mitrella dichroa (Sowerby I, 1844)

Synonyms
- Buccinum parvulum Dunker, 1847; Columbella dichroa Sowerby I, 1844 (basionym); Columbella orphia Duclos, 1846; Columbella schrammi Petit de la Saussaye, 1853; Pyrene parvula (Dunker, 1847)

= Mitrella dichroa =

Species of gastropod

Mitrella dichroa is a species of small sea snail in the family Columbellidae, the dove snails.

== Description ==
The length of the shell attains 7.6 mm.

== Distribution ==
This species occurs in the Caribbean Sea, the Gulf of Mexico and the Lesser Antilles.
