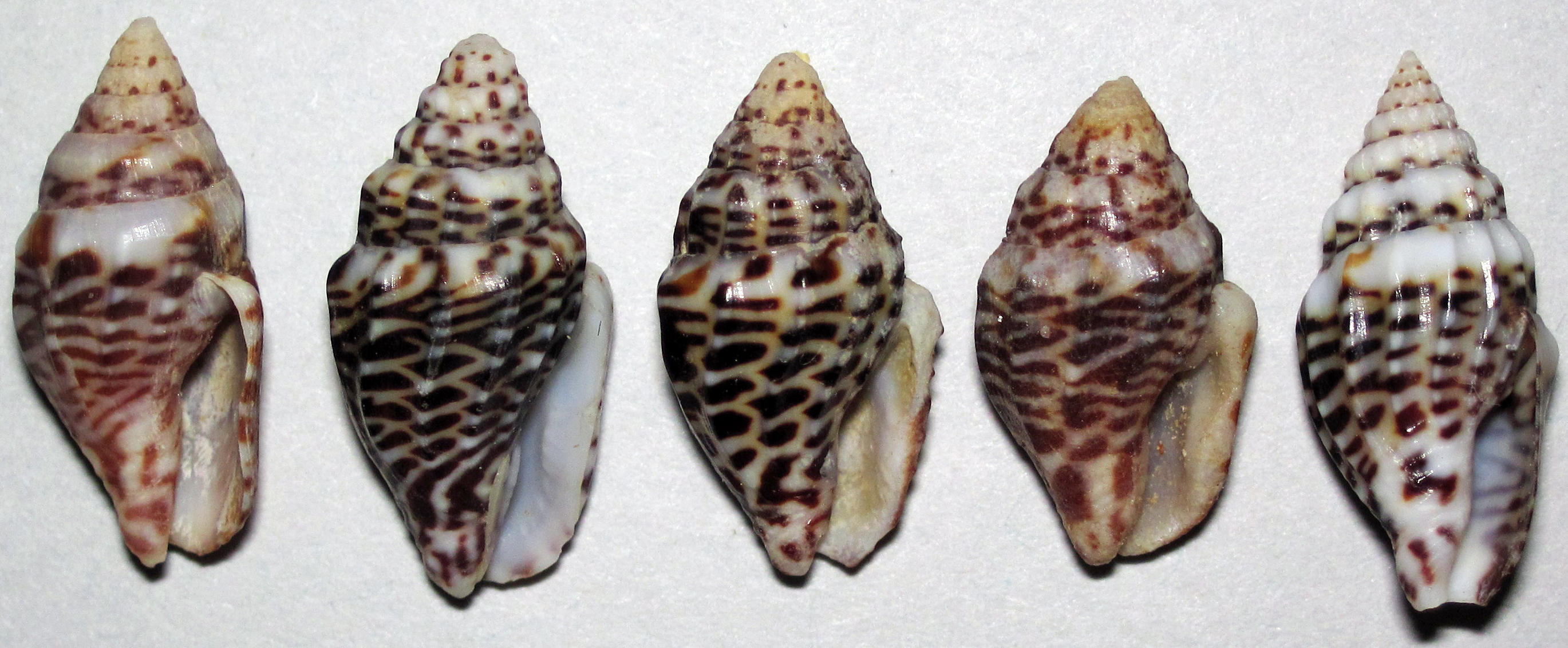
- Shell of Anachis fluctuata

Scientific classification
- Kingdom: Animalia
- Phylum: Mollusca
- Class: Gastropoda
- Subclass: Caenogastropoda
- Order: Neogastropoda
- Family: Columbellidae
- Genus: Anachis
- Species: A. fluctuata

Binomial name
- Anachis fluctuata (G. B. Sowerby I, 1832)

Synonyms
- Colombella costata Duclos, 1840; Colombella fluctuosa Duclos, 1846; Columbella costata Valenciennes, 1833; Columbella fluctuata G. B. Sowerby I, 1832 (original combination); Columbella suturalis J. E. Gray, 1834 (junior synonym); Costoanachis fluctuata (G. B. Sowerby I, 1832) ·

= Anachis fluctuata =

Species of gastropod

Anachis fluctuata is a species of sea snail in the family Columbellidae, the dove snails.

== Description ==
The length of the shell attains 21 mm.

(Original description in Latin) The oblong shell is white and is marked with black or chestnut spots and undulations. It has a dusky epidermis, and the spire's apex is usually eroded. There are 7 whorls, which are longitudinally ribbed, with the ribs on the body whorl being abbreviated. The aperture is constricted in the middle. The outer lip is emarginated on the upper part, and the inner lip is denticulate below.

== Distribution ==
This species occurs in the Gulf of California and in the Pacific Ocean off Costa Rica, Panama and Ecuador
