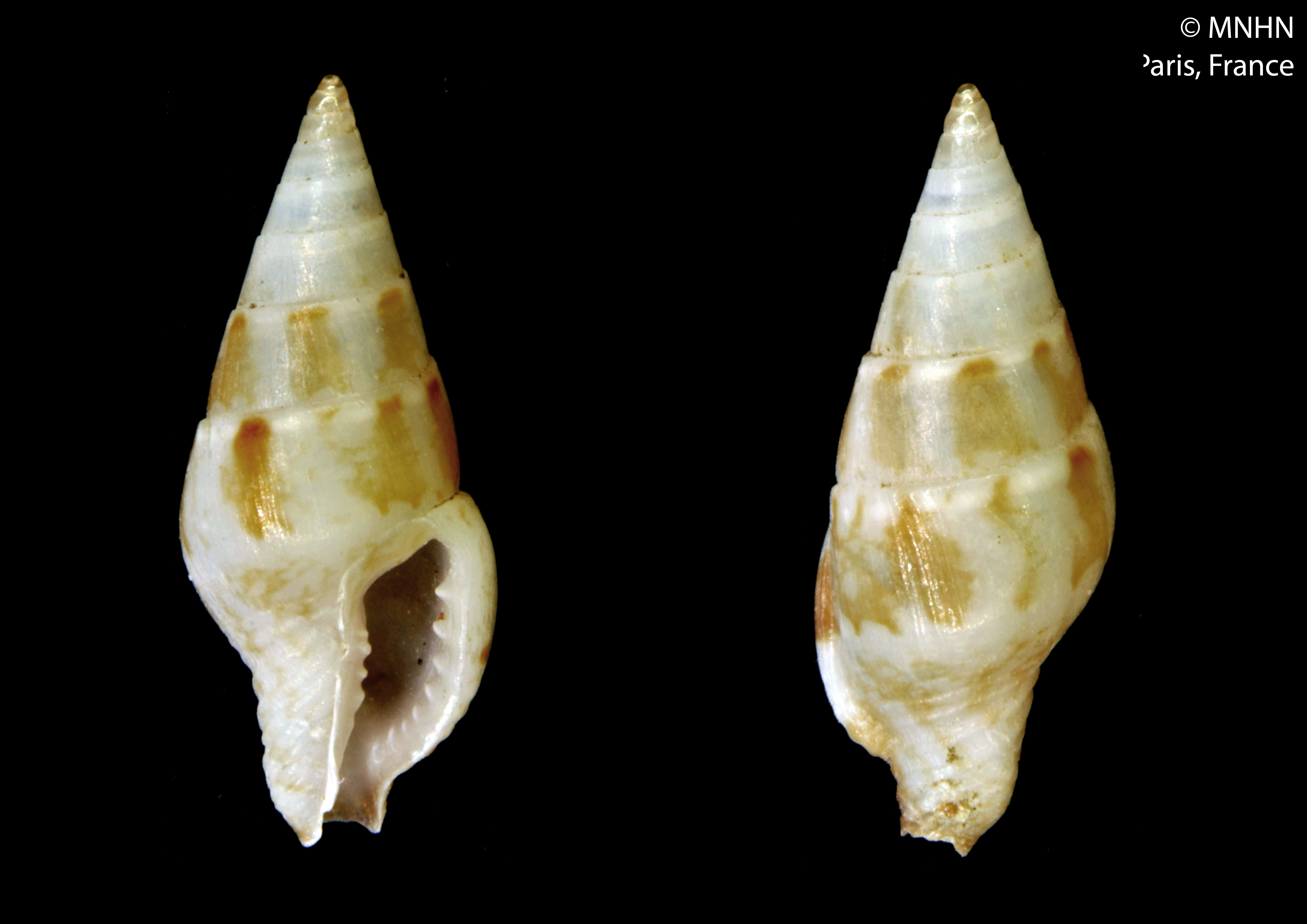

Scientific classification
- Kingdom: Animalia
- Phylum: Mollusca
- Class: Gastropoda
- Subclass: Caenogastropoda
- Order: Neogastropoda
- Family: Columbellidae
- Genus: Indomitrella
- Species: I. conspersa

Binomial name
- Indomitrella conspersa (Gaskoin, 1851)

Synonyms
- Columbella alabastroides Kobelt, 1893; Columbella alabastrum Martens, 1880; Columbella alabastrum Reeve, 1859; Columbella conspersa Gaskoin, 1851; Columbella conspersa nodosa (f) Schepman, M.M., 1911; Columbella contaminata Gaskoin, 1851; Columbella niveomarginata Smith, 1879; Columbella sigaloessa Melvill & Standen, 1896; Mitrella conspersa (Gaskoin, 1851); Mitrella conspersa var. circulata Hervier, 1899; Mitrella conspersa var. diluta Hervier, 1899; Mitrella conspersa var. intemerata Hervier, 1899; Mitrella conspersa var. nodosa Schepman, 1911; Mitrella conspersa var. suspecta Hervier, 1899; Mitrella (Mitrella) alabastroides Kobelt, W., 1895; Mitrella sigaloessa Melvill, J.C. & R. Standen, 189

= Indomitrella conspersa =

Species of gastropod

Indomitrella conspersa is a species of sea snail, a marine gastropod mollusc in the family Columbellidae, the dove snails.

== Description ==
The shell size varies between 8 mm and 14 mm.

== Distribution ==
This species occurs in the Red Sea, in the Indian Ocean off Madagascar, Mauritius, and off the Loyalty Islands, Indonesia and the Philippines.
