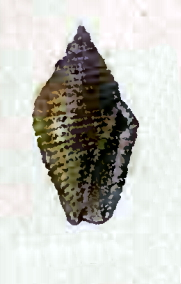
- Drawing of a shell of Mitromorpha dormitor

Scientific classification
- Kingdom: Animalia
- Phylum: Mollusca
- Class: Gastropoda
- Subclass: Caenogastropoda
- Order: Neogastropoda
- Superfamily: Conoidea
- Family: Mitromorphidae
- Genus: Mitromorpha
- Species: M. dormitor

Binomial name
- Mitromorpha dormitor (Sowerby I, 1844)

Synonyms
- Columbella dormitor Sowerby I, 1844; Columbella dortimor [sic] (misspelling); Columbella purpurascens Adams, C.B., 1845; Lovellona dormitor (Sowerby I, 1844); Minipyrene dortimor [sic]

= Mitromorpha dormitor =

Species of gastropod

Mitromorpha dormitor is a species of sea snail, a marine gastropod mollusk in the family Mitromorphidae. The length of the shell attains 7.3 mm. This marine species occurs in the Caribbean Sea off Jamaica, Guadeloupe, Curaçao and St Vincent.
