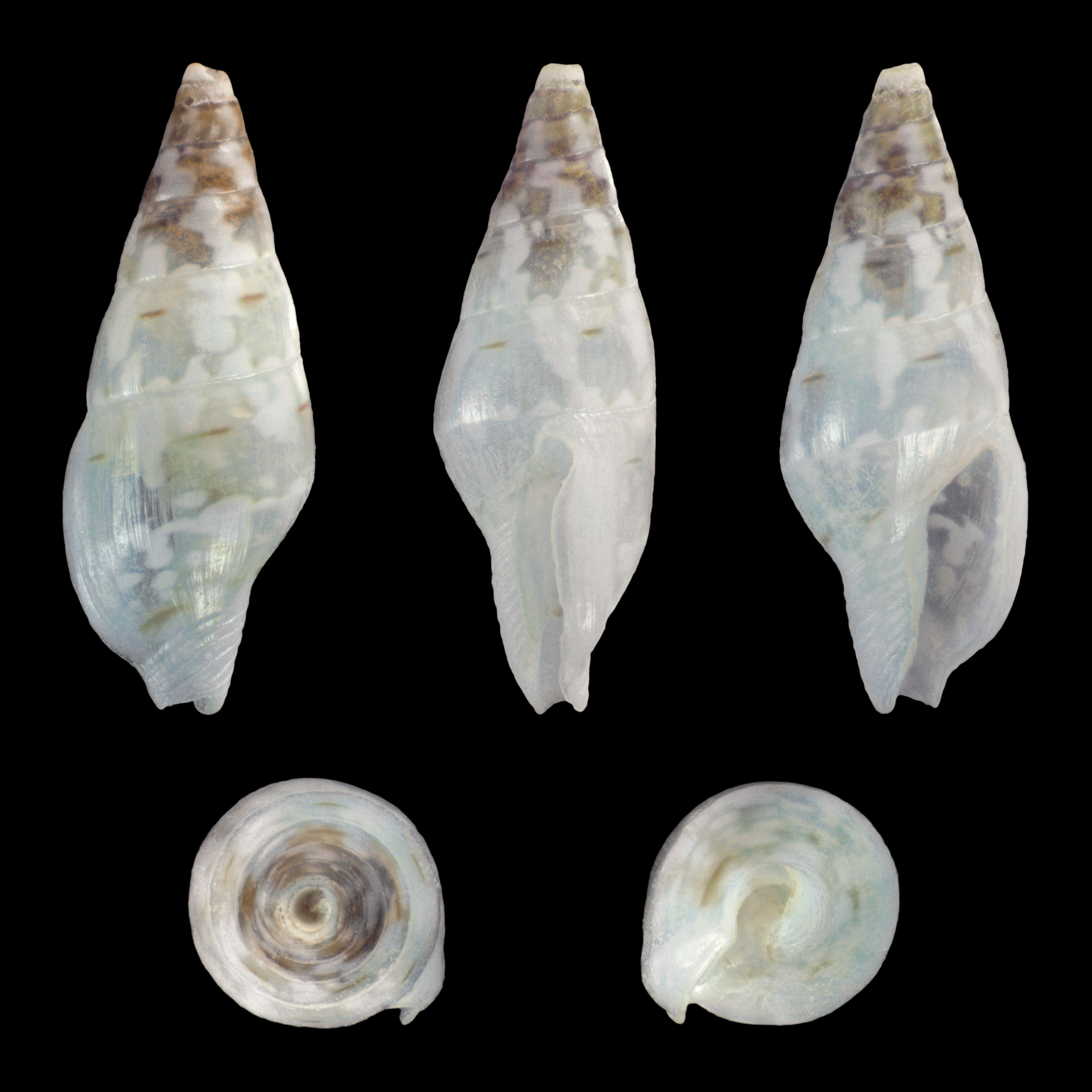

Scientific classification
- Kingdom: Animalia
- Phylum: Mollusca
- Class: Gastropoda
- Subclass: Caenogastropoda
- Order: Neogastropoda
- Family: Columbellidae
- Genus: Mitrella
- Species: M. nympha

Binomial name
- Mitrella nympha (Kiener, 1841)

Synonyms
- List: Columbella alabastroides var. illibata Hervier, 1899; Columbella articulata Souverbie, 1864; Columbella articulata var. flavidula Hervier, 1899; Columbella articulata var. pallidior Hervier, 1899; Columbella articulata var. retiaria Hervier, 1899; Columbella articulata var. subnympha Hervier, 1899; Columbella carolinae Smith, 1876; Columbella carolinae var. bifloccata Hervier, 1899; Columbella carolinae var. nivosula Hervier, 1899; Columbella eximia Reeve, 1859; Columbella eximia var. candescens Hervier, 1899; Columbella eximia var. incerta Hervier, 1899; Columbella eximia var. tremulina Hervier, 1899; Columbella fusiformis Pease, 1868; Columbella galaxias Reeve, 1859; Columbella galaxias var. exolescens Hervier, 1899; Columbella nivosula Hervier, R.P.J., 1899; Columbella nubeculata Reeve, 1859; Columbella nubeculata var. obnubila Hervier, 1899; Columbella nympha Kiener, 1841 (basionym); Columbella pusilla Pease, 1862; Columbella venulata G.B. Sowerby III, 1894; Columbella venulata var. interpuncta Hervier, 1899

= Mitrella nympha =

Species of gastropod

Mitrella nympha is a species of sea snail in the family Columbellidae, the dove snails.

== Description ==
Members of the order Neogastropoda are mostly gonochoric and broadcast spawners. After birth, Mitrella nympha embryos develop into planktonic trochophore larvae, then into juvenile veligers before becoming fully grown adults.

Their shells vary between 9 mm and 13 mm in size and are in the shape of narrow tapered spirals.

== Distribution ==
This marine species occurs in the Red Sea and off the Philippines.
