= Mitrella mindorensis =

Scientific classification
- Kingdom: Animalia
- Phylum: Mollusca
- Class: Gastropoda
- Subclass: Caenogastropoda
- Order: Neogastropoda
- Family: Columbellidae
- Genus: Mitrella
- Species: M. mindoroensis

Binomial name
- Mitrella mindoroensis (Reeve, 1859)

Synonyms
- Columbella mindorensis Reeve, 1859 (basionym); Columbella mindoroensis; Pyrene mindorensis (Reeve, 1859)

Species of gastropod

Mitrella mindoroensis is a species of sea snail in the family Columbellidae, the dove snails.

== Description ==
The shell size ranges from 6 to 12 millimeters in length.

== Distribution ==
This marine species occurs off the Philippines and in the Red Sea.
