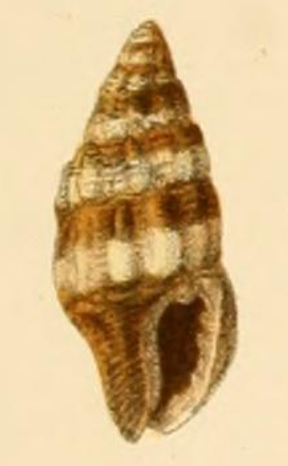
- Shell of Anachis richardi (holotype)

Scientific classification
- Kingdom: Animalia
- Phylum: Mollusca
- Class: Gastropoda
- Subclass: Caenogastropoda
- Order: Neogastropoda
- Family: Columbellidae
- Genus: Anachis
- Species: A. richardi

Binomial name
- Anachis richardi (Dautzenberg & Fischer, 1906)

Synonyms
- Columbella richardi Dautzenberg & H. Fischer, 1906

= Anachis richardi =

Species of gastropod

Anachis richardi is a species of sea snail in the family Columbellidae, the dove snails.

== Description ==
The length of the shell attains 5¼ mm, its diameter 2¼ mm.

(Original description in French) The shell is solid, elongated, and turreted, composed of six convex whorls separated by a well-marked and broadly undulating suture. Two embryonic whorls are smooth, while the others are adorned with strong, prominent longitudinal ribs, numbering 10 on each of the last two whorls. Well-defined decurrent striae are apparent in the intervals between the ribs but fade on their convexity. On the body whorl, the ribs do not extend entirely to the base, which shows only decurrent striae.

The aperture is small, not reaching half the height of the shell, and terminates at the base in a very short, open siphonal canal. The columella is almost perpendicular, slightly twisted at the base, and provided with a narrow, appressed callosity. The outer lip is thick, bearing three rather strong denticles inside.

The coloration is a chestnut brown, crossed in the middle of the whorls by a white decurrent band.

== Distribution ==
This marine species occurs off Cape Verde.
