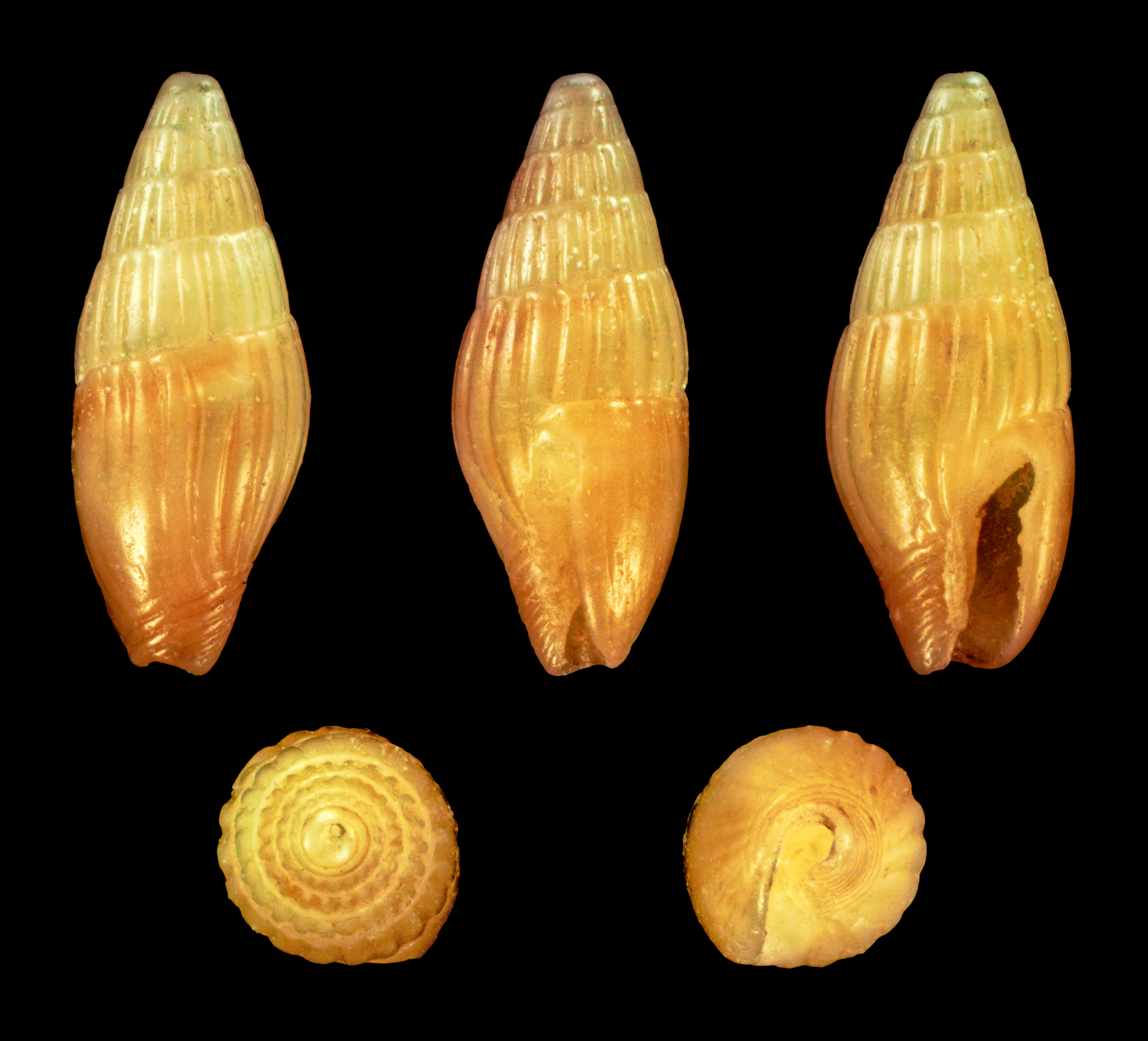

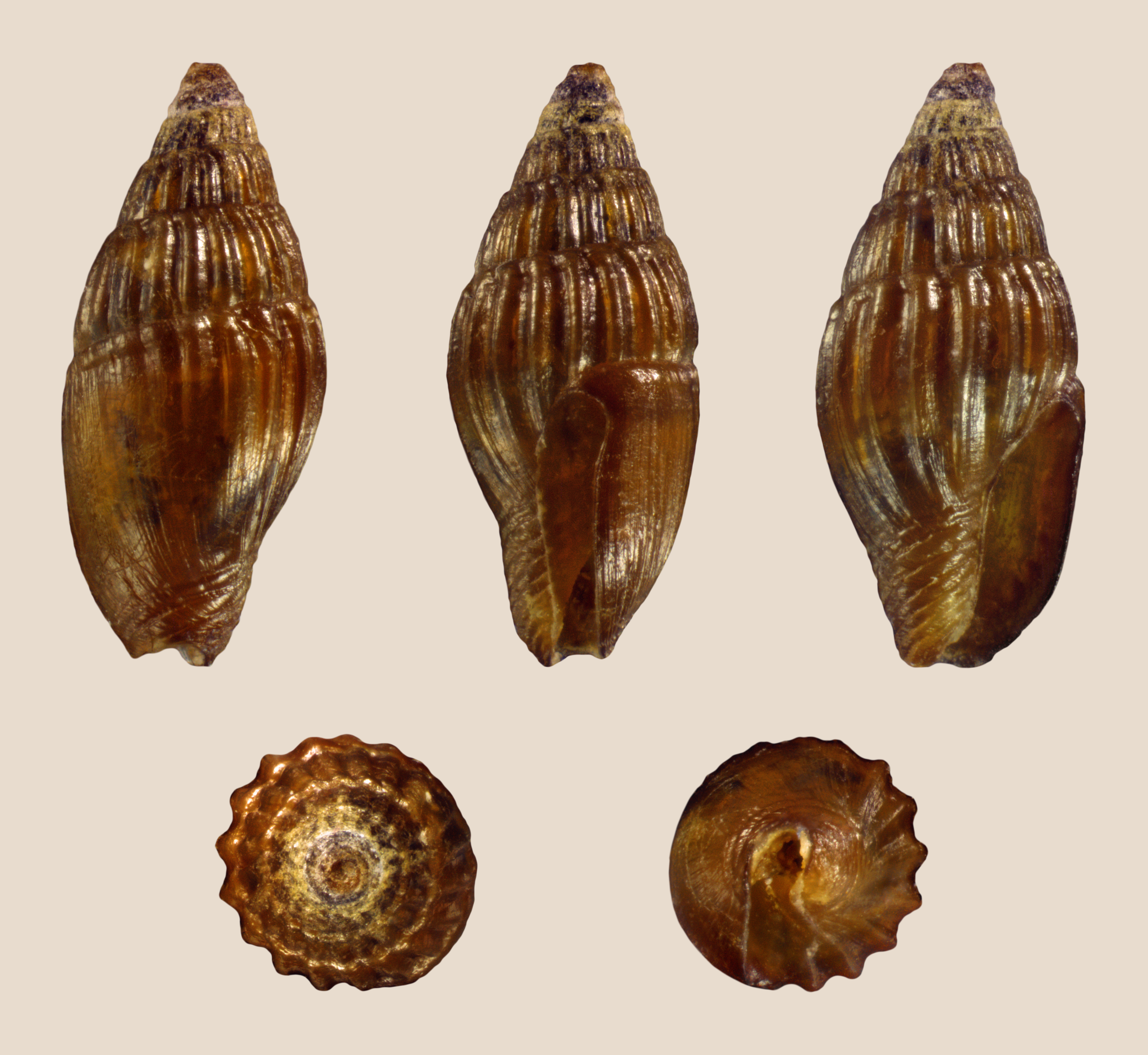

Scientific classification
- Kingdom: Animalia
- Phylum: Mollusca
- Class: Gastropoda
- Subclass: Caenogastropoda
- Order: Neogastropoda
- Family: Columbellidae
- Genus: Zafra
- Species: Z. pumila

Binomial name
- Zafra pumila (Dunker, 1858)

Synonyms
- Anachis bifasciata Ardovini, 2005; Columbella atomella Duclos, 1835; Columbella gowllandi Brazier, 1875; Columbella gowllandi Brazier, 1874; Columbella hordeacea Philippi, 1849; Columbella minuscula Gould, 1860; Columbella pumila Dunker, 1858 (basionym); Columbella pumila Souverbie, 1863; Columbella regulus Souverbie, 1864; Pyrene minuscula (Gould, 1860 in 1859-60); Zafra minuscula Gould, A.A., 1860; Zafra avicennia Hedley, 1914; Zafra gowllandi Brazier, J., 1874; Zafra bifasciata Ardovini, R., 2005

= Zafra pumila =

Species of gastropod

Zafra pumila is a species of sea snail in the family Columbellidae, the dove snails.

== Description ==
The shell size varies between 3 mm and 5 mm.

(Described as Zafra avicennia) The solid, glossy shell has an ovate-fusiform shape. Its colour is uniform cinnamon-brown. It contains seven gradate whorls. The body whorl is inflated at the periphery and contracted at the base.

Sculpture : first two whorls are smooth, the remainder are radially ribbed. The ribs are prominent, as broad as their interspaces, discontinuous from whorl to whorl, increasing in thickness as the shell grows, produced to the base, amounting to sixteen on the penultimate whorl. The last five gradually vanish from the base upwards and onwards, leaving a smooth space behind the aperture. Beneath the suture, along all the sculptured whorls, winds a cord less prominent than the ribs, uniting and overriding them. On the anterior extremity there are seven small, but sharp, spiral threads, ceasing where the ribs commence. The vertical aperture is narrow and posteriorly channelled. The outer lip is thickened and everted; within there are three small denticles decreasing anteriorly. The inner lip has a raised margin plicated by the anterior spirals. The siphonal canal is short, broad, and slightly recurved.

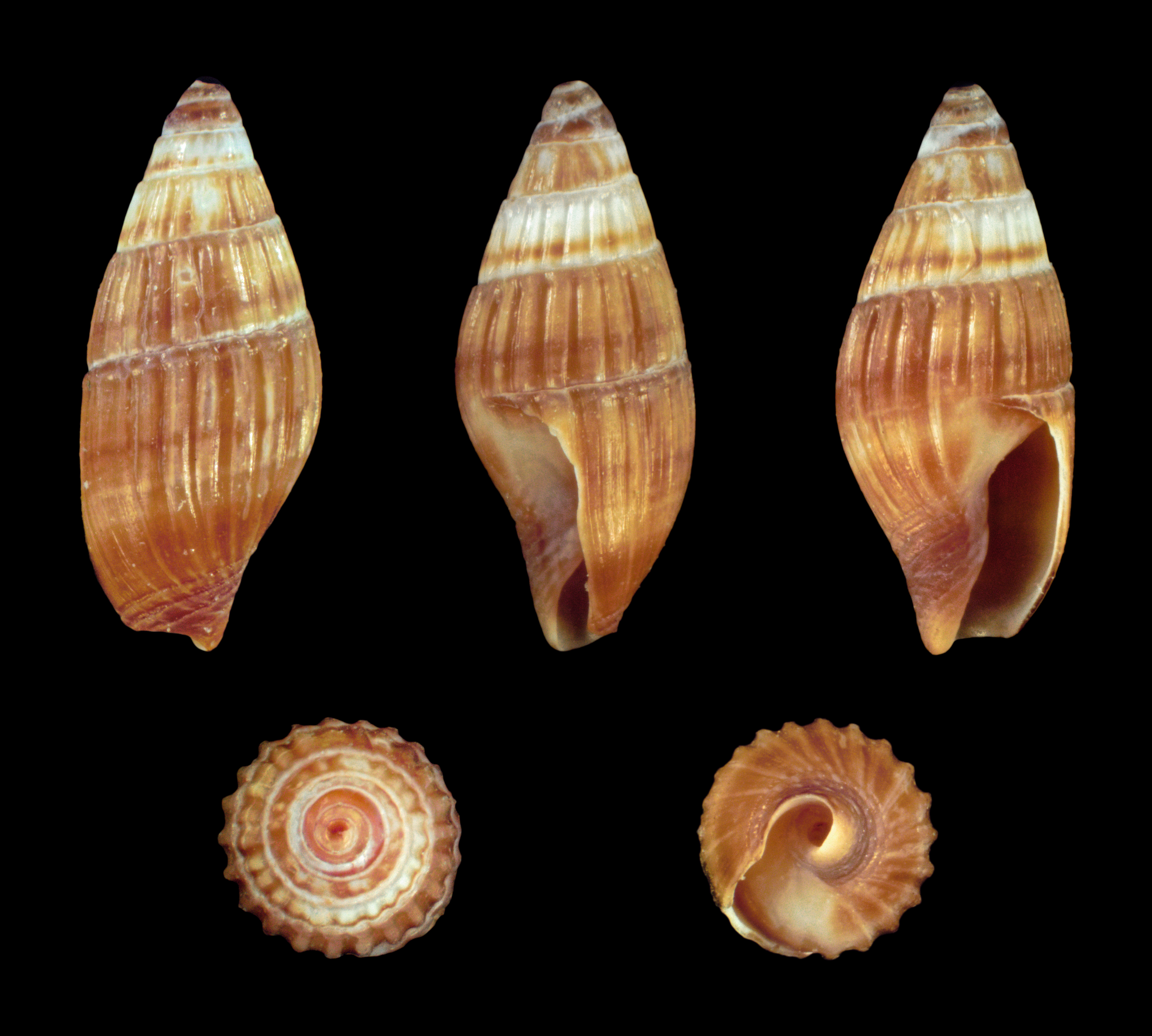
Zafra pumila forma minuscula, dark variety

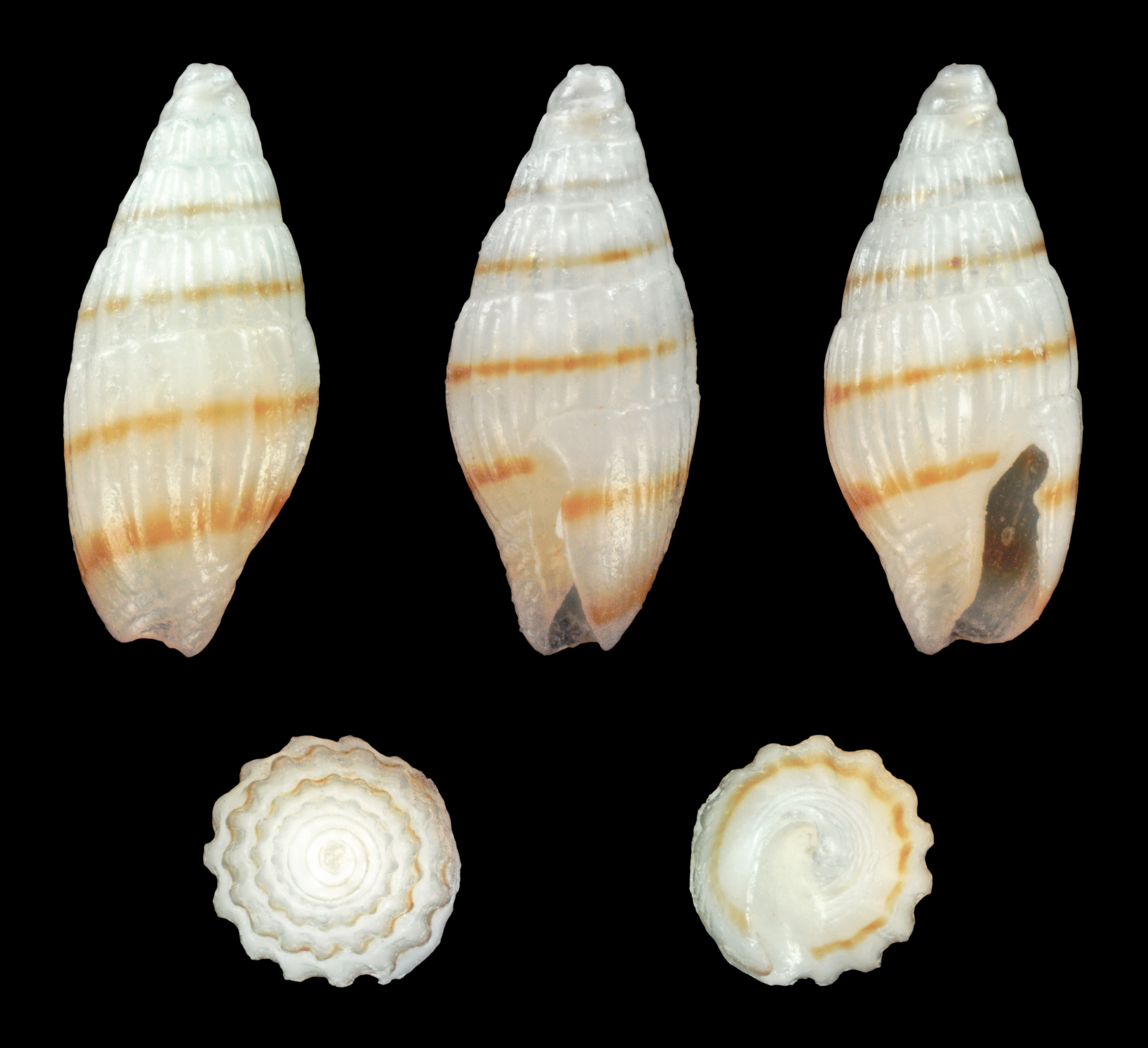
Zafra pumila forma minuscula, pale variety

== Distribution ==
This species occurs in the Red Sea and in the Indian Ocean off Madagascar, Northern KwaZuluNatal, RSA, Réunion and in the Western Pacific Ocean, New Caledonia, Queensland, and New South Wales
