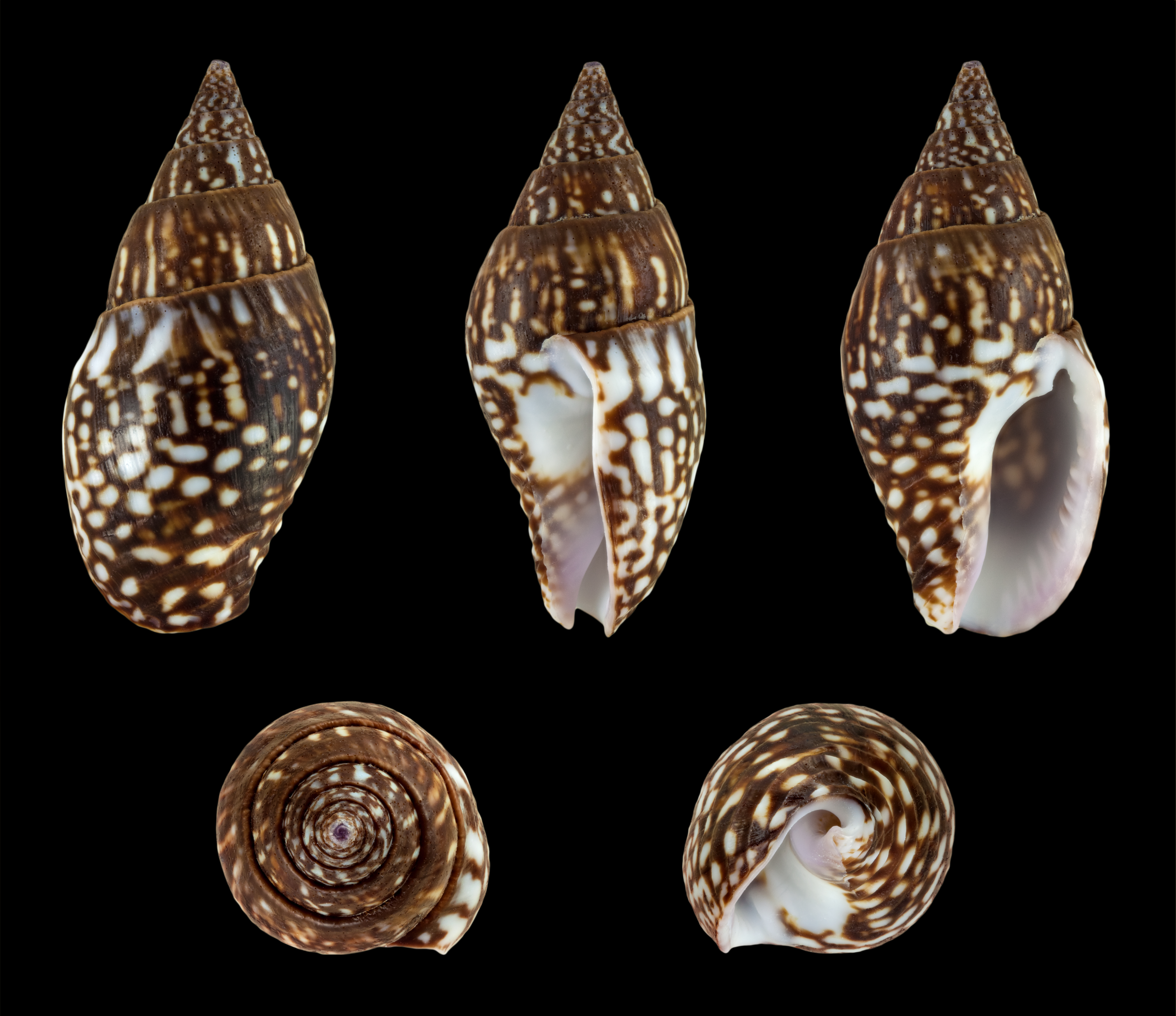
- Shell of Anachis fasciata

Scientific classification
- Kingdom: Animalia
- Phylum: Mollusca
- Class: Gastropoda
- Subclass: Caenogastropoda
- Order: Neogastropoda
- Family: Columbellidae
- Genus: Anachis
- Species: A. fasciata

Binomial name
- Anachis fasciata (G. B. Sowerby I, 1825)

Synonyms
- Colombella anacteola Duclos, 1840 junior subjective synonym; Columbella fasciata G. B. Sowerby I, 1825 superseded combination; Columbella javacensis Reeve, 1858 junior subjective synonym

= Anachis fasciata =

Species of gastropod

Anachis fasciata is a species of sea snail in the family Columbellidae, the dove snails.

== Description ==
The length of the shell attains 34 mm.

(Original description) The shell is oblong and smooth, featuring an obtuse apex. It is transversely sulcate (grooved) at the base. The whorls are variegated (streaked/spotted) with whitish and fulvous (tawny), appearing white posteriorly. The suture is strong, with a sub-obsolete groove located near the suture. The columella is rather smooth.

== Distribution ==
This species occurs off Indonesia, near Bali.
