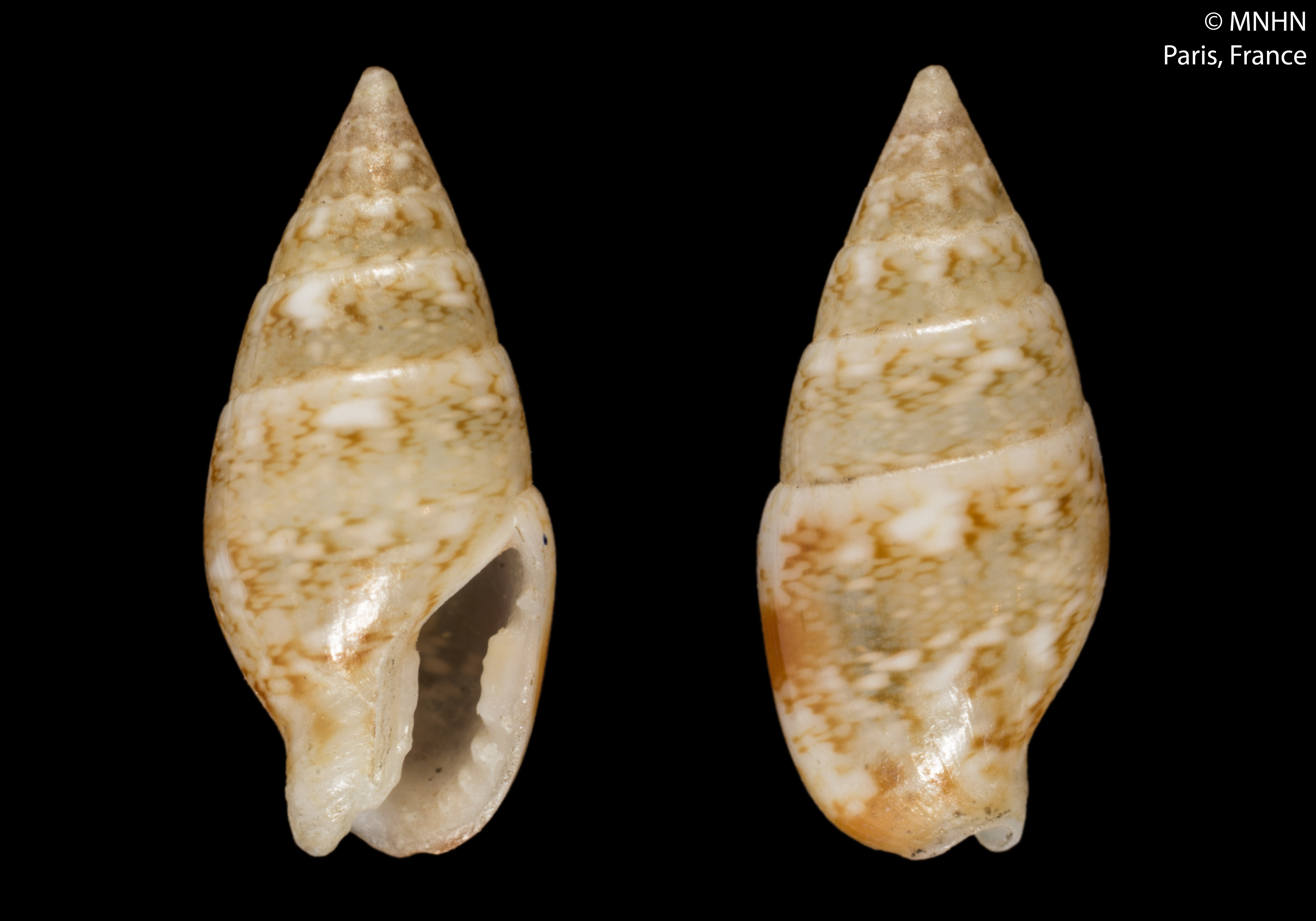
- Shell of Mitrella floccata hanleyi (neotype at MNHN, Paris)

Scientific classification
- Kingdom: Animalia
- Phylum: Mollusca
- Class: Gastropoda
- Subclass: Caenogastropoda
- Order: Neogastropoda
- Family: Columbellidae
- Genus: Mitrella
- Species: M. floccata

Binomial name
- Mitrella floccata (Reeve, 1859)

Synonyms
- Columbella floccata Reeve, 1859 (basionym); Mitrella floccata floccata (Reeve, 1859) · accepted, alternate representation; Pyrene floccata (Reeve, 1859)

= Mitrella floccata =

Species of gastropod

Mitrella floccata is a species of sea snail in the family Columbellidae, the dove snails.

== Distribution ==
This species occurs in the Indian Ocean off Tanzania, Mozambique, and South Africa.

== Subspecies ==
There are two subspecies:

- Mitrella floccata floccata (Reeve, 1859)
- Mitrella floccata hanleyi (Deshayes, 1863) (synonyms: Columbella hanleyi Deshayes, 1863; Columbella robillardi G. B. Sowerby III, 1894; Mitrella hanleyi (Deshayes, 1863))

== Description ==
The shell length varies between 10 mm and 16 mm.
