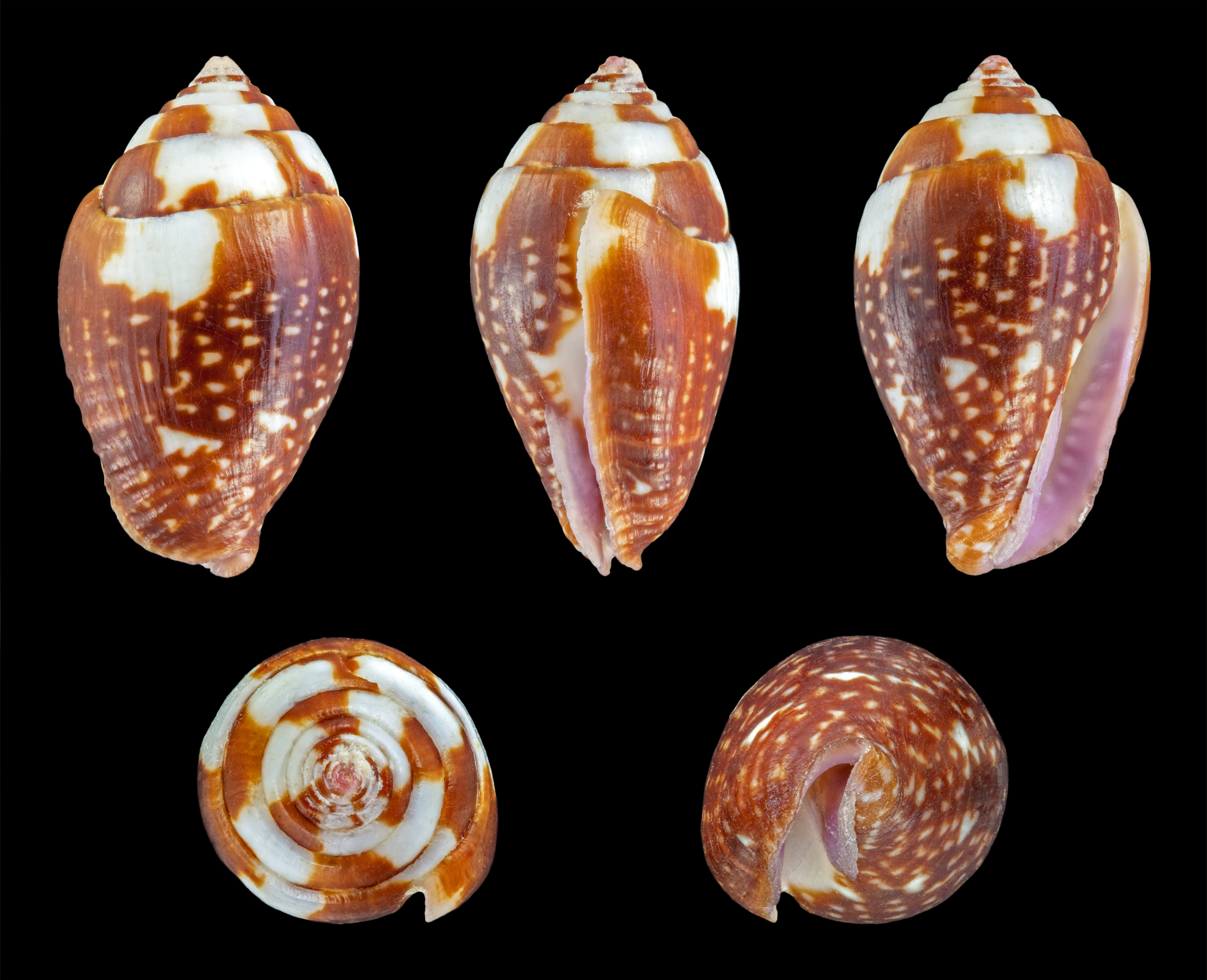
- A shell of Pyrene punctata

Scientific classification
- Kingdom: Animalia
- Phylum: Mollusca
- Class: Gastropoda
- Subclass: Caenogastropoda
- Order: Neogastropoda
- Superfamily: Buccinoidea
- Family: Columbellidae
- Genus: Pyrene; Röding, 1798

Synonyms
- Columbella (Conidea) Swainson, 1840; Conidea Swainson, 1840

= Pyrene (gastropod) =

Genus of gastropods

Pyrene is a genus of small sea snails, marine gastropod mollusks in the family Columbellidae.

== Species ==
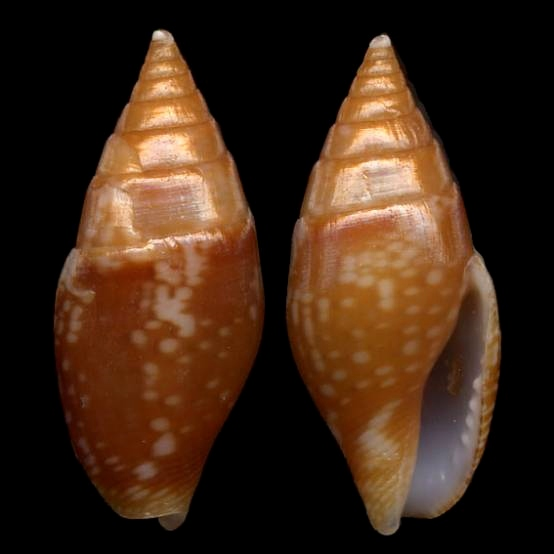
Pyrene marmorata

Species within the genus Pyrene include:

- Pyrene albinodulosa ogasawarana (Pilsbry, 1904-b)
- Pyrene aspersa (G.B. Sowerby I, 1844)
- Pyrene decussata (G.B. Sowerby I, 1844)
- Pyrene exima (Reeve, 1859 in 1843–65)
- Pyrene fasciata G.B. Sowerby I, 1825
- Pyrene flava (Bruguière, 1789)
- Pyrene morrisoni Willan, 2001
- Pyrene obscura (G.B. Sowerby I, 1844)
- Pyrene obtusa (G.B. Sowerby I, 1832)
- Pyrene ocellatula (Hervier, 1899)
- Pyrene picta (Reeve, 1859)
- Pyrene punctata (Bruguière, 1789)
- Pyrene rapaensis K. Monsecour & D. Monsecour, 2018
- Pyrene sorongensis Van Bruggen, 1956 (taxon inquirendum)
- Pyrene splendidula (G.B. Sowerby I, 1844)

Species brought into synonymy

- Pyrene aikeni Lussi, 2009: synonym of Sulcomitrella aikeni (Lussi, 2009)
- Pyrene albuginosa (Reeve, 1859) : synonym of Mitrella albuginosa (Reeve, 1859)
- Pyrene antelmei Viader, 1938: synonym of Mitrella antelmei (Viader, 1938)
- Pyrene atrata (Gould, 1860): synonym of Zafra atrata (Gould, 1860)
- Pyrene aureola Howard, 1963: synonym of Columbella aureomexicana (Howard, 1963)
- Pyrene aureomexicana Howard, 1963: synonym of Columbella aureomexicana (Howard, 1963)
- Pyrene axiaerata Verco, 1910: synonym of Mitrella menkeana (Reeve, 1858)
- Pyrene azora (Duclos, 1840): synonym of Euplica festiva (Deshayes in Laborde & Linant, 1834)
- Pyrene babylonica Hedley, 1907: synonym of Zafra babylonica (Hedley, 1907) (original combination)
- Pyrene beachportensis Verco, 1910: synonym of Anachis beachportensis (Verco, 1910)
- Pyrene bella (Reeve, 1859): synonym of Mitrella albuginosa (Reeve, 1859)
- Pyrene bidentata (Menke, 1843): synonym of Euplica bidentata (Menke, 1843)
- Pyrene blanda (Sowerby, 1844): synonym of Mitrella blanda (G. B. Sowerby I, 1844)
- Pyrene bonariense Castellanos & Deambrosi, 1967: synonym of Astyris bonariensis Castellanos & Deambrosi, 1967
- Pyrene calva Verco, 1910: synonym of Retizafra calva (Verco, 1910)
- Pyrene costulata (Cantraine, 1835): synonym of Amphissa acutecostata (Philippi, 1844)
- Pyrene dartevelli Knudsen, 1956: synonym of Mitrella dartevelli (Knudsen, 1956)
- Pyrene dartevilli Knudsen, 1958: synonym of Mitrella dartevelli (Knudsen, 1956)
- Pyrene deshayesii (Crosse, 1859): synonym of Euplica deshayesii (Crosse, 1859)
- Pyrene dianae (Thiele, 1925): synonym of Decipifus consanguineus (G. B. Sowerby III, 1897)
- Pyrene diminuta (C. B. Adams, 1852): synonym of Parvanachis diminuta (C. B. Adams, 1852)
- Pyrene dolicha Verco, 1910: synonym of Anachis atkinsoni (Tenison Woods, 1876)
- Pyrene dunkeri (Tryon, 1883): synonym of Mitrella bicincta (A. Gould, 1860)
- Pyrene emergens Fischer-Piette & Nicklès, 1946: synonym of Anachis cuspidata (Marrat, 1877)
- Pyrene essingtonensis (Reeve, 1859): synonym of Mitrella essingtonensis (Reeve, 1859)
- Pyrene eustomus Jousseaume, 1876: synonym of Graphicomassa adiostina (Duclos, 1840)
- Pyrene faba (Linnaeus, 1758): synonym of Glabella faba (Linnaeus, 1758)
- Pyrene felina Hedley, 1915: synonym of Anachis miser (G. B. Sowerby I, 1844)
- Pyrene fenestrata Verco, 1910: synonym of Anachis fenestrata (Verco, 1910) (original combination)
- Pyrene filmerae (G. B. Sowerby III, 1900): synonym of Pyrene flava filmerae (G. B. Sowerby III, 1900)
- Pyrene flavida (Lamarck, 1822): synonym of Pyrene flava (Bruguière, 1789)
- Pyrene flexuosus Hutton, 1878: synonym of Zemitrella choava (Reeve, 1859)
- Pyrene floccata (Reeve, 1859): synonym of Mitrella floccata (Reeve, 1859)
- Pyrene freytagi (Maltzan, 1884): synonym of Anachis freytagi (Maltzan, 1884)+* Pyrene fulgurans (Lamarck, 1822): synonym of Pictocolumbella ocellata (Link, 1807)
- Pyrene fuscolineata Thiele, 1930: synonym of Mokumea fuscolineata (Thiele, 1930) (original combination)
- Pyrene gemmulifera Hedley, 1907: synonym of Retizafra gemmulifera (Hedley, 1907) (original combination)
- Pyrene hedleyi Thiele, 1930: synonym of Zafra hedleyi (Thiele, 1930) (original combination)
- Pyrene intricata Hedley, 1912: synonym of Retizafra intricata (Hedley, 1912) (original combination)
- Pyrene iodostoma (Gaskoin, 1852): synonym of Mitrella puella (G. B. Sowerby I, 1844): synonym of Indomitrella puella (G. B. Sowerby I, 1844)
- Pyrene isabellei (d'Orbigny, 1839): synonym of Anachis isabellei (d'Orbigny, 1839)
- Pyrene jaffaensis Verco, 1910: synonym of Aesopus jaffaensis (Verco, 1910) (original combination)
- Pyrene jousseaumei Drivas & Jay, 1997: synonym of Pardalinops jousseaumei (Drivas & Jay, 1997) (original combination)
- Pyrene kobai Golikov, Kussakin, 1962: synonym of Astyris kobai (Golikov & Kussakin, 1962)
- Pyrene kraussi (.B. Sowerby I, 1844): synonym of Anachis kraussi (G.B. Sowerby I, 1844)
- Pyrene lactea (Kiener, 1834): synonym of Pyrene obtusa (G. B. Sowerby I, 1832)
- Pyrene lacteoides Habe & Kosuge, 1966: synonym of Pardalinops testudinaria (Link, 1807)
- Pyrene langleyi (G. B. Sowerby III, 1897): synonym of Decipifus consanguineus (G. B. Sowerby III, 1897)
- Pyrene ledaluciae Rios & Tostes, 1981: synonym of Eurypyrene ledaluciae (Rios & Tostes, 1981) (original combination)
- Pyrene lightfooti (E. A. Smith, 1901): synonym of Zafrona lightfooti (E. A. Smith, 1901)
- Pyrene ligula (Duclos, 1835): synonym of Mitrella ligula (Duclos, 1835)
- Pyrene lurida Hedley, 1907: synonym of Pyreneola lurida (Hedley, 1907) (original combination)
- Pyrene marmorata (Gray, 1839) – probably synonym of Pardalinops marmorata
- Pyrene melvillei (Strebel, 1905): synonym of Anachis isabellei (d'Orbigny, 1839)
- Pyrene melvilli Knudsen, 1956: synonym of Mitrella melvilli (Knudsen, 1956)
- Pyrene mindorensis (Reeve, 1859): synonym of Mitrella mindorensis (Reeve, 1859)
- Pyrene minuscula (Gould, 1860 in 1859–60): synonym of Zafra pumila (Dunker, 1858)
- Pyrene moleculina (Duclos, 1840): synonym of Mitrella moleculina (Duclos, 1840)
- Pyrene morini Viader, 1938: synonym of Zafra morini (Viader, 1938) (original combination)
- Pyrene natalensis (Tomlin, 1926): synonym of Mitrella natalensis Tomlin, 1926
- Pyrene nodulosa Nowell-Usticke, 1959: synonym of Euplica varians (G. B. Sowerby I, 1832)
- Pyrene ocellata (Link, 1807): synonym of Pictocolumbella ocellata (Link, 1807)
- Pyrene opulens Woolacott, 1957: synonym of Pyrene flava (Bruguière, 1789)
- Pyrene ovulata (Lamarck, 1822): synonym of Conella ovulata (Lamarck, 1822)
- Pyrene pallaryi (Dautzenberg, 1927): synonym of Mitrella pallaryi (Dautzenberg, 1927): synonym of Mitrella canariensis (d'Orbigny, 1840)
- Pyrene pardalina (Lamarck, 1822): synonym of Pardalinops testudinaria (Link, 1807)
- Pyrene parhelena Barnard, 1959: synonym of Zemitrella parhelena (Barnard, 1959) (original combination)
- Pyrene parvula (Dunker, 1847): synonym of Mitrella dichroa (G. B. Sowerby I, 1844)
- Pyrene parvula Viader, 1951: synonym of Mokumea parvula (Viader, 1951) (original combination)
- Pyrene phaula (Melvill & Standen, 1901): synonym of Zafra phaula (Melvill & Standen, 1901)
- Pyrene peroniana Hedley, 1913: synonym of Mitrella peroniana (Hedley, 1913) (original combination)
- Pyrene perparvula Viader, 1951: synonym of Mokumea parvula (Viader, 1951)
- Pyrene philippinarum Récluz, 1843 – synonym: Parametaria philippinarum Reeve, 1842
- Pyrene propinqua (E.A. Smith, 1891): synonym of Pardalinops propinqua (E. A. Smith, 1891)
- Pyrene pudica (Brazier, 1877): synonym of Mitrella pudica (Brazier, 1877)
- Pyrene purpurea (H. Adams, 1873): synonym of Seminella peasei (Martens & Langkavel, 1871)
- Pyrene regnardi Viader, 1938: synonym of Mitrella regnardi (Viader, 1938) (original combination)
- Pyrene retiaria Tomlin, 1931: synonym of Zafrona isomella (Duclos, 1840)
- Pyrene rhombiferum Röding, 1798: synonym of Pyrene punctata (Bruguière, 1789)
- Pyrene rubra (E. von Martens, 1881): synonym of Mitrella rubra (E. von Martens, 1881) (superseded combination)
- Pyrene rustica (Linnaeus, 1758): synonym of Columbella rustica (Linnaeus, 1758)
- Pyrene sagittifera Thiele, 1930: synonym of Zafra hedleyi (Thiele, 1930)
- Pyrene salmoneus Barnard, 1963: synonym of Astyris salmonea (Barnard, 1963) (original combination)
- Pyrene saviniae Viader, 1951: synonym of Zafra saviniae (Viader, 1951) (original combination)
- Pyrene scripta (Linnaeus, 1758): synonym of Mitrella scripta (Linnaeus, 1758)
- Pyrene selasphora (Melvill & Standen, 1901): synonym of Zafra selasphora (Melvill & Standen, 1901)
- Pyrene subcrebraria Pilsbry, 1905: synonym of Pardalinops testudinaria (Link, 1807)
- Pyrene tankervillei (Hervier, 1899): synonym of Pyrene obtusa (G.B. Sowerby I, 1832)
- Pyrene testudinaria (Link, 1807): synonym of Pardalinops testudinaria (Link, 1807)
- Pyrene turturina (Lamarck, 1822): synonym of Euplica turturina (Lamarck, 1822)
- Pyrene tylerae (Griffith & Pidgeon, 1834): synonym of Pardalinops testudinaria (Link, 1807)
- Pyrene varians (G.B. Sowerby II, 1832): synonym of Euplica varians (G.B. Sowerby I, 1832)
- Pyrene vercoi Thiele, 1930: synonym of Zafra vercoi (Thiele, 1930) (original combination)
- Pyrene verdensis Knudsen, 1956: synonym of Mitrella verdensis (Knudsen, 1956)
- Pyrene versicolor (G. B. Sowerby I, 1832): synonym of Euplica scripta (Lamarck, 1822)
- Pyrene vulpecula (G. B. Sowerby I, 1844): synonym of Pardalinops testudinaria (Link, 1807)
- Pyrene zebra (Wood, 1828): synonym of Anachis miser (G. B. Sowerby I, 1844)
