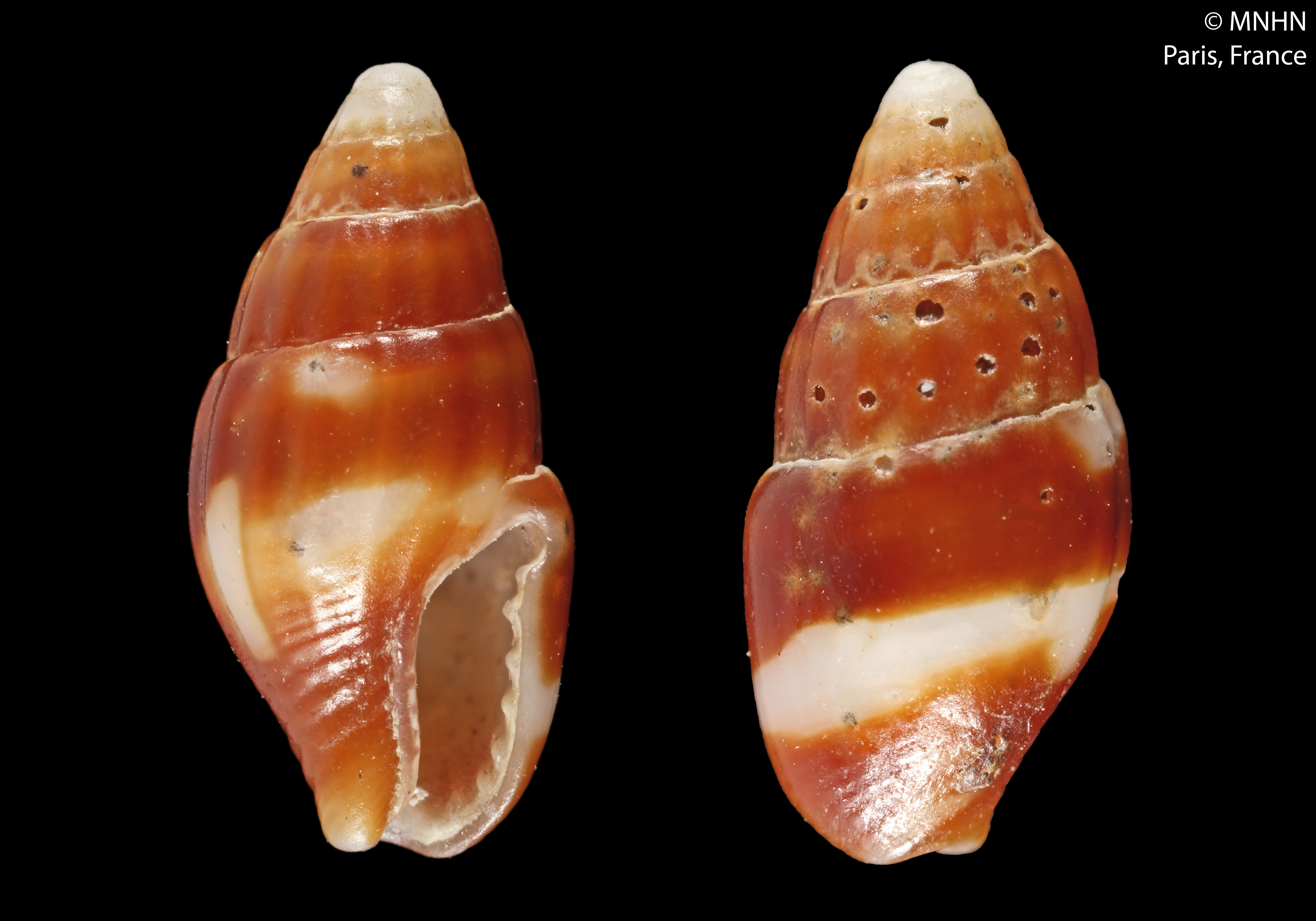
- Parvanachis pygmaea

Scientific classification
- Kingdom: Animalia
- Phylum: Mollusca
- Class: Gastropoda
- Subclass: Caenogastropoda
- Order: Neogastropoda
- Superfamily: Buccinoidea
- Family: Columbellidae
- Genus: Parvanachis; Radwin, 1968

Type species
- Buccinum obesum C. B. Adams, 1845

Synonyms
- Anachis (Parvanachis) Radwin, 1968 (original rank)

= Parvanachis =

Genus of gastropods

Parvanachis is a genus of sea snails, marine gastropod molluscs in the family Columbellidae, the dove snails.

== Species ==
Species within the genus Parvanachis include:

- Parvanachis adamsi deMaintenon, 2014
- Parvanachis bocapanensis Arias Ávila, 2021
- Parvanachis dichroma deMaintenon, 2014
- Parvanachis diminuta (C. B. Adams, 1852)
- Parvanachis forcellii Arias Ávila, 2021
- Parvanachis minibrunnea deMaintenon, 2014
- Parvanachis mullineri (Poorman, 1983)
- Parvanachis nigricans (G. B. Sowerby I, 1844)
- Parvanachis obesa (C. B. Adams, 1845)
- Parvanachis ostreicola (G.B. Sowerby III, 1882)
- Parvanachis paessleri (Strebel, 1905)
- Parvanachis pepecarrascoi Ortea & Espinosa, 2017
- Parvanachis pygmaea (G. B. Sowerby I, 1832)

Species brought into synonymy

- Parvanachis isabellei (d'Orbigny, 1839): synonym of Anachis isabellei (d'Orbigny, 1839)
- Parvanachis pulchella (Blainville, 1829): synonym of Falsuszafrona pulchella (Blainville, 1829)
