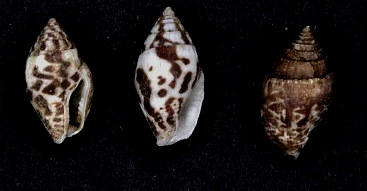
- Three shells of Pyrene obtusa (museum specimens at Naturalis Biodiversity Center)

Scientific classification
- Kingdom: Animalia
- Phylum: Mollusca
- Class: Gastropoda
- Subclass: Caenogastropoda
- Order: Neogastropoda
- Family: Columbellidae
- Genus: Pyrene
- Species: P. obtusa

Binomial name
- Pyrene obtusa (G.B. Sowerby I, 1832)

Synonyms
- Buccinum lacteum Kiener, 1834; Colombella uvania Duclos, P.L. 1840; Columbella funiculata Souverbie, M. & Montrouzier, R.P. 1865; Columbella obtusa G.B. Sowerby I, 1832 (basionym); Columbella tringa var. tankervillei Hervier, 1899; Columbella zelina Duclos, 1835; Columbella zelina var. cylindra Hervier, 1899; Pyrene lactea (Kiener, 1834); Pyrene obtusa curta Schmeltz, J.D.K. 1874.; Pyrene tankervillei (Hervier, 1899)

= Pyrene obtusa =

Species of gastropod

Pyrene obtusa is a species of sea snail, a marine gastropod mollusk in the family Columbellidae, the dove snails.

== Description ==
The shell size varies between 11 mm and 18 mm

The small shell is pretty thin, ovate, conical and smooth. It is of a diaphanous white. The sutures are indistinctly apparent. The spire is composed of six convex whorls, ornamented at their base with spots of a duller white. The body whorl is as large as all the others, striated at base, and surrounded, towards the middle, with small, distant spots, articulated by a reddish line. The aperture is ovate. The outer lip denticulated within, and thickened outwardly, even to the base of the shell.

== Distribution ==
This species occurs in the Indian Ocean off East Africa and Mauritius and Réunion and in the Indo-West Pacific; off Australia (Queensland)
