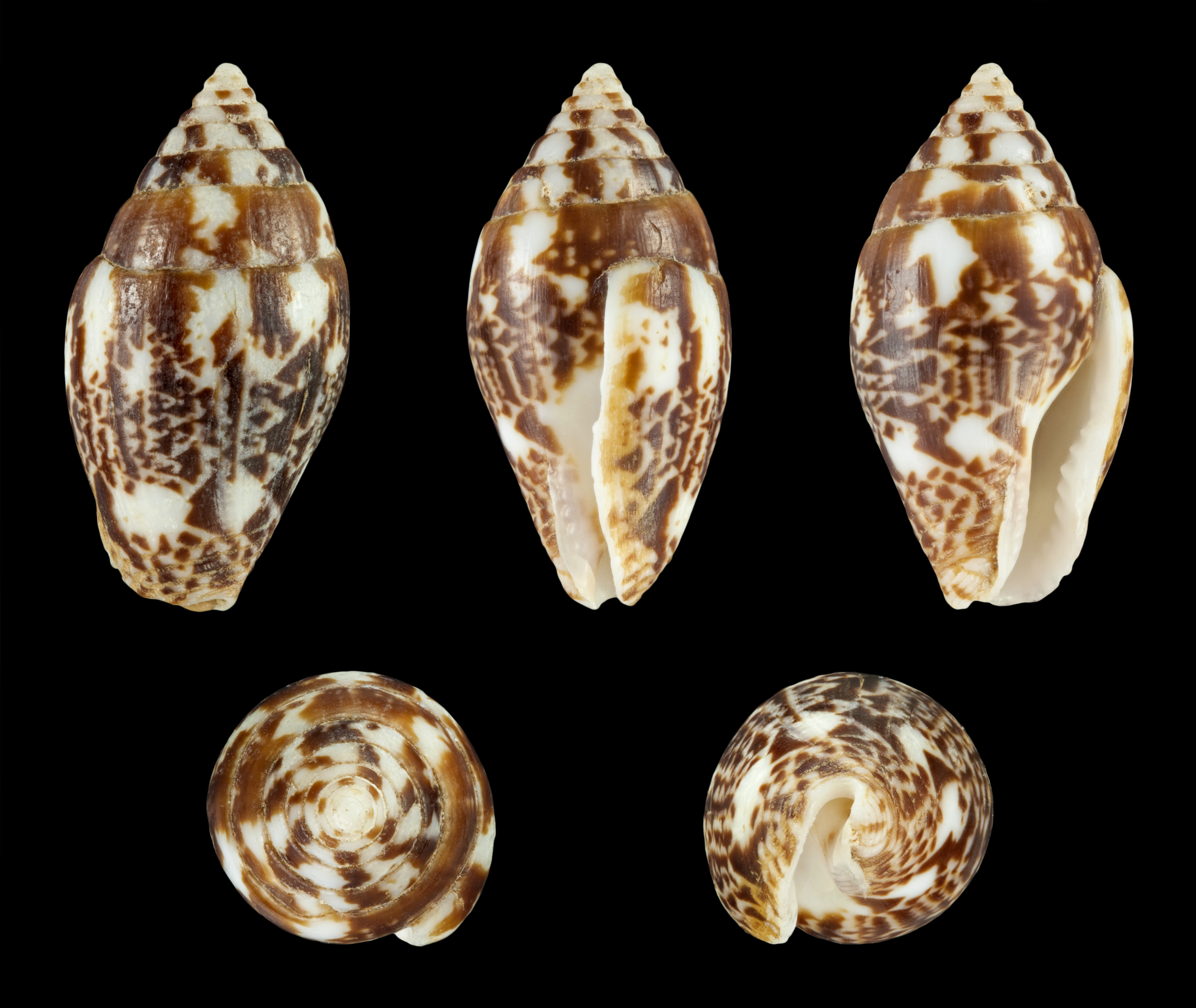

Scientific classification
- Kingdom: Animalia
- Phylum: Mollusca
- Class: Gastropoda
- Subclass: Caenogastropoda
- Order: Neogastropoda
- Family: Columbellidae
- Genus: Pyrene
- Species: P. flava

Binomial name
- Pyrene flava (Bruguière, 1789)

Synonyms
- Buccinum flavum Bruguière, 1789 (basionym); Colombella castanea Duclos, 1848 ·; Columbella faleonta Duclos, 1835; Columbella filmerae G.B. Sowerby III, 1900; Columbella flava (Bruguière, 1789); Columbella flava var. ouveana Hervier, 1899; Columbella flavida Lamarck, 1822; Columbella flavida var. castanea Duclos, 1848; Columbella flexuosa Duclos, 1835; Columbella funiculata Souverbie, 1865; Columbella lugubris Kiener, 1841; Columbella ouveana Hervier, R.P.J., 1899; Columbella rubicunda Quoy, J.R.C. & J.P. Gaimard, 1832; Columbella undata Duclos, 1835; Pyrene flavida (Lamarck, 1822) ·; Pyrene opulens Woolacott, 1957; Pyrene undata (Duclos, 1840)

= Pyrene flava =

Species of gastropod

Pyrene flava, common name : the yellow dove shell, is a species of sea snail, a marine gastropod mollusk in the family Columbellidae, the dove snails.

Subspecies

- Pyrene flava filmerae (G. B. Sowerby III, 1900)
- Pyrene flava flava (Bruguière, 1789)

== Description ==
The shell size varies between 12 mm and 25 mm.

== Distribution ==
This species occurs in the Red Sea and in the Indian Ocean off Madagascar, Tanzania and in the Indo-West Pacific.
