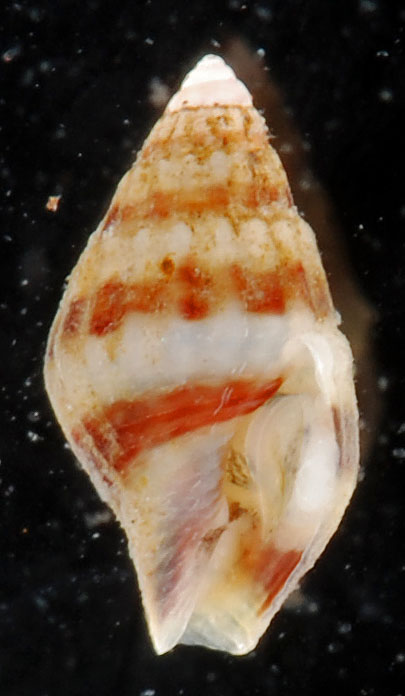

Scientific classification
- Kingdom: Animalia
- Phylum: Mollusca
- Class: Gastropoda
- Subclass: Caenogastropoda
- Order: Neogastropoda
- Family: Columbellidae
- Genus: Parvanachis
- Species: P. obesa

Binomial name
- Parvanachis obesa (C. B. Adams, 1845)

Synonyms
- Anachis obesa (Adams, 1845); Anachis radwini Altena, 1975; Buccinum concinnum C. B. Adams, 1845 (non Dillwyn, 1817); Buccinum obesum C. B. Adams, 1845 (original combination); Columbella costulata C. B. Adams, 1850; Columbella crassilabris Reeve, 1859; Columbella decipiens C. B. Adams, 1850; † Columbella ornata Ravenel, 1859; Costoanachis obesa (C. B. Adams, 1845)

= Parvanachis obesa =

Species of gastropod

Parvanachis obesa, common name the fat dovesnail, is a species of sea snail, a marine gastropod mollusc in the family Columbellidae, the dove snails.

== Distribution ==
This marine species occurs from 37°N to 35°S; 97.5°W to 36°W. Distribution: USA: Virginia, North Carolina, Georgia, Florida; Florida: East Florida, West Florida; USA: Louisiana, Texas; Mexico; Mexico: Veracruz, Campeche State, Yucatan State, Quintana Roo; Costa Rica, Panama, Colombia, Venezuela; Venezuela: Sucre, Isla Margarita; Bermuda, Jamaica; Virgin Islands: St. Croix; off French Guiana.; Surinam, Brazil; Brazil: Alagoas, Sao Paulo, Parana, Santa Catarina; Uruguay
