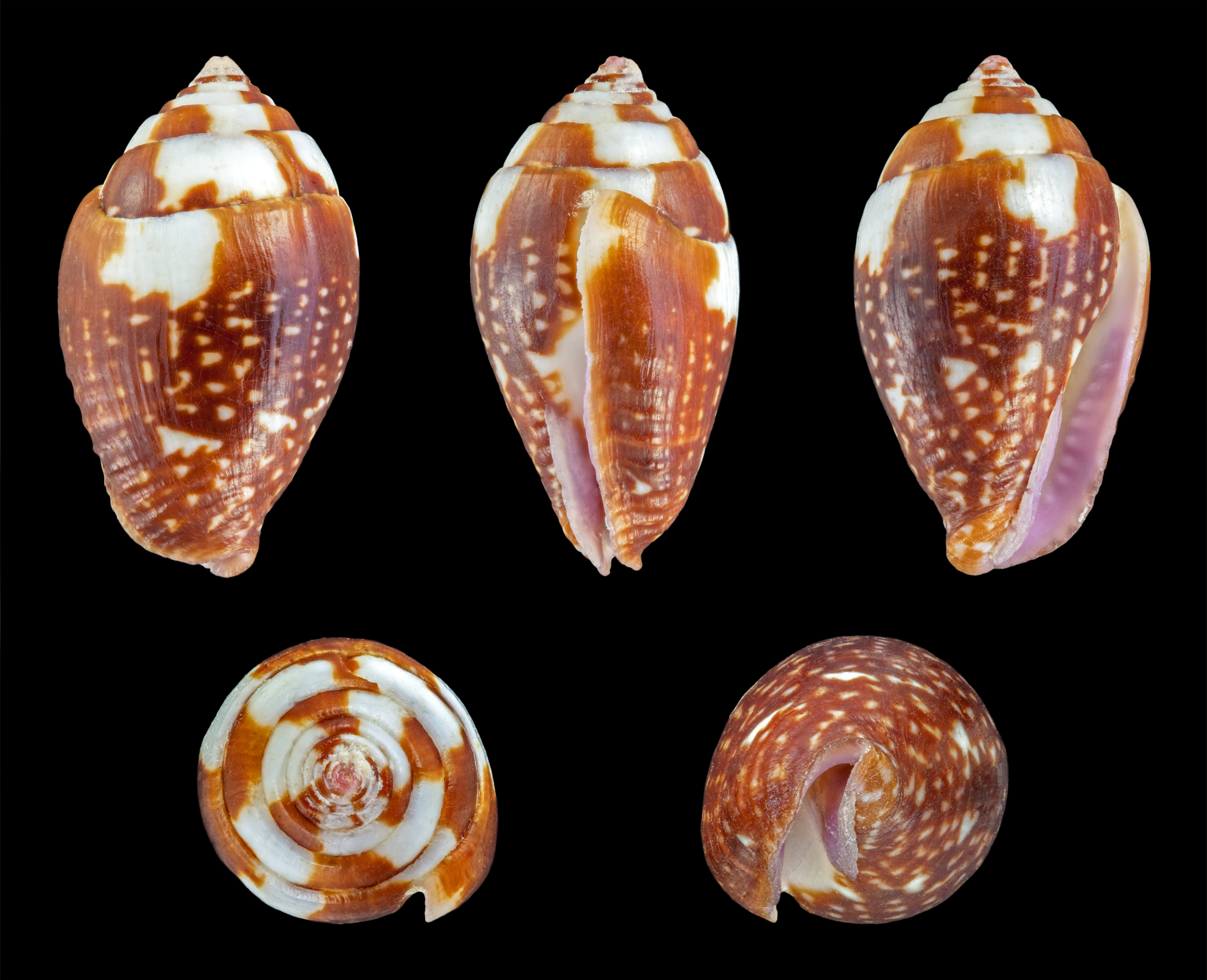

Scientific classification
- Kingdom: Animalia
- Phylum: Mollusca
- Class: Gastropoda
- Subclass: Caenogastropoda
- Order: Neogastropoda
- Family: Columbellidae
- Genus: Pyrene
- Species: P. punctata

Binomial name
- Pyrene punctata (Bruguière, 1789)

Synonyms
- Buccinum rhombiferum Röding, P.F., 1798; Buccinum punctatum Bruguière, 1789 (basionym); Columbella leucosticta Link, 1807; Columbella semipunctata Lamarck, 1822; Columbella torva Dillwyn, L.W., 1817; Columbella zellina Duclos, P.L., 1840; Pyrene morrisoni Willan, 2001; Pyrene opulens Woolacott, 1957; Pyrene rhombiferum Bolten, 1798; Voluta discors Gmelin, 1790

= Pyrene punctata =

Species of gastropod

Pyrene punctata, common name : the telescoped dove shell, is a species of sea snail, a marine gastropod mollusk in the family Columbellidae, the dove snails.

== Description ==
The shell size varies between 14 mm and 26 mm.

== Distribution ==
This species is distributed in the Western Pacific and along Australia.
