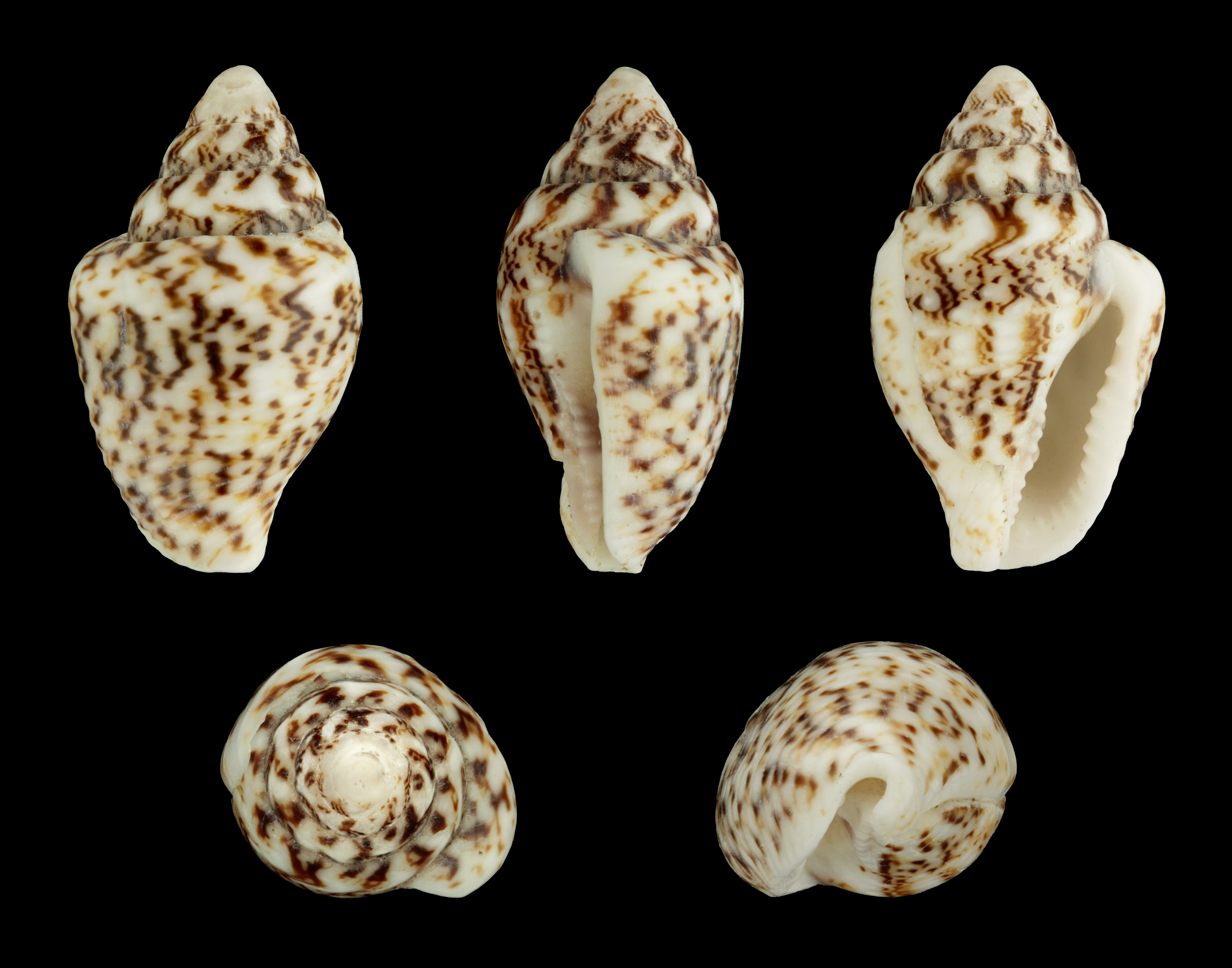
- Euplica scripta

Scientific classification
- Kingdom: Animalia
- Phylum: Mollusca
- Class: Gastropoda
- Subclass: Caenogastropoda
- Order: Neogastropoda
- Superfamily: Buccinoidea
- Family: Columbellidae
- Genus: Euplica; Dall, 1889

Type species
- Columbella turturina Lamarck, 1822

= Euplica =

Genus of gastropods

Euplica is a genus of sea snails, marine gastropod mollusks in the family Columbellidae, the dove snails.

== Species ==
Species within the genus Euplica include :

- Euplica bidentata (Menke, 1843)
- Euplica borealis (Pilsbry, 1904)
- Euplica brunnidentata de Maintenon, 2008
- Euplica deshayesi (Crosse, 1859)
- Euplica festiva (Deshayes, 1834)
- Euplica ionida (Duclos, 1835)
- Euplica lipparinii Cossignani, 2005
- Euplica livescens (Reeve, 1859)
- Euplica loisae Rehder, 1980
- Euplica prellei Cossignani, 2005
- Euplica scripta (Lamarck, 1822)
- Euplica turturina (Lamarck, 1822)
- Euplica varians (G.B. Sowerby, 1832)

Species brought into synonymy

- Euplica reticulata Cossignani, 2005: synonym of Euplica festiva (Deshayes in Laborde & Linant, 1834)
- Euplica versicolor (G. B. Sowerby I, 1832): synonym of Euplica scripta (Lamarck, 1822)
