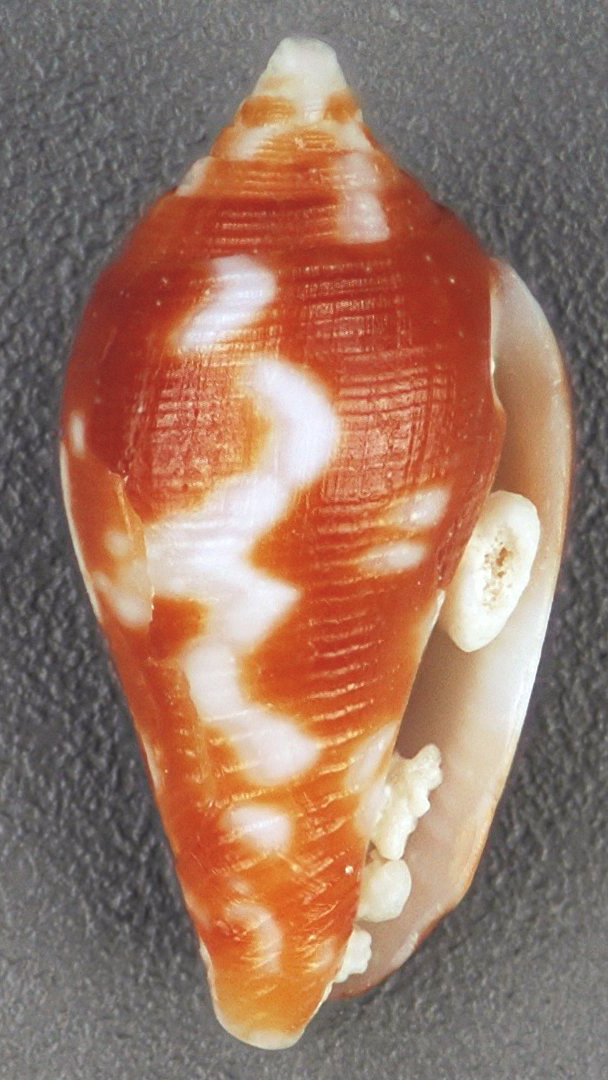
- Conella ovulata shell

Scientific classification
- Kingdom: Animalia
- Phylum: Mollusca
- Class: Gastropoda
- Subclass: Caenogastropoda
- Order: Neogastropoda
- Family: Columbellidae
- Genus: Conella; Swainson, 1840

= Conella =

Genus of gastropods

Conella is a genus of sea snails, marine gastropod molluscs in the family Columbellidae, the dove snails.

== Species ==
Species within the genus Conella include:

- Conella ovulata (Lamarck, 1822)
- Conella ovuloides (C. B. Adams, 1850)
