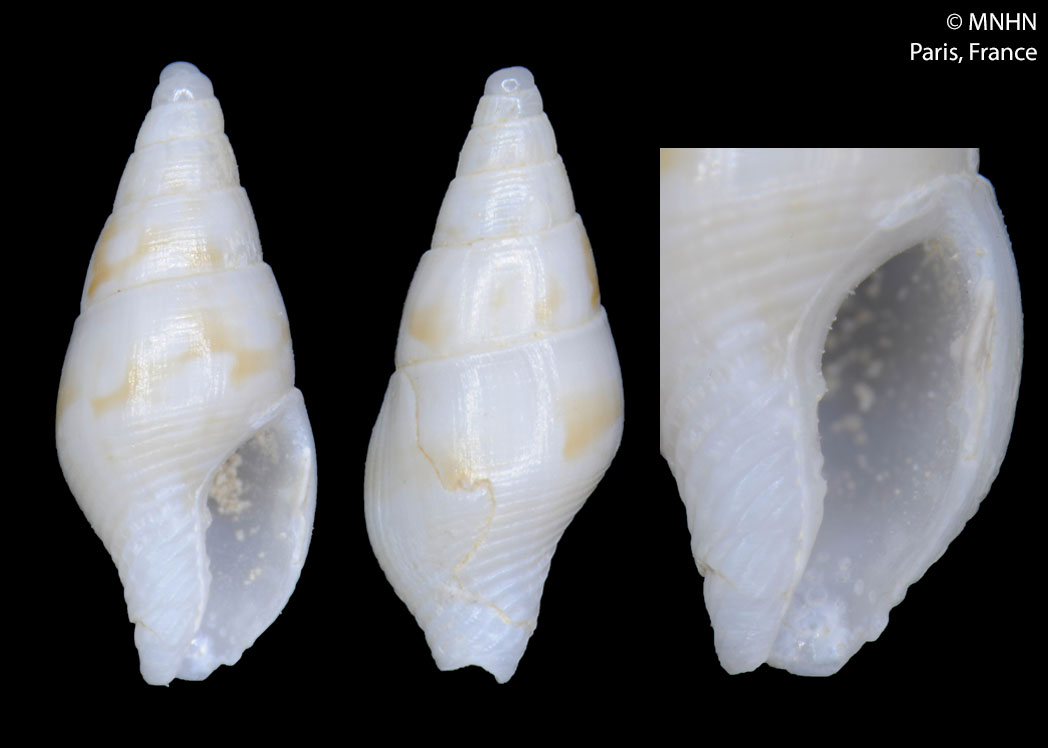
- Shell of Sulcomitrella adversa (holotype at MNHN, Paris)

Scientific classification
- Kingdom: Animalia
- Phylum: Mollusca
- Class: Gastropoda
- Subclass: Caenogastropoda
- Order: Neogastropoda
- Superfamily: Buccinoidea
- Family: Columbellidae
- Genus: Sulcomitrella; Kuroda, Habe & Oyama, 1971

Type species
- Mitrella monodonta Habe, 1958

Synonyms
- Mitrella (Sulcomitrella) Habe, 1958

= Sulcomitrella =

Genus of gastropods

Sulcomitrella is a genus of sea snails, marine gastropod molluscs in the family Columbellidae, the dove snails.

== Species ==
Species within the genus Sulcomitrella include:

- Sulcomitrella adversa K. Monsecour & D. Monsecour, 2016
- Sulcomitrella aikeni (Lussi, 2009)
- Sulcomitrella alisiensis K. Monsecour & D. Monsecour, 2016
- Sulcomitrella circumstriata (Schepman, 1911)
- Sulcomitrella evanescens K. Monsecour & D. Monsecour, 2016
- Sulcomitrella hohonu K. Monsecour & D. Monsecour, 2018
- Sulcomitrella humerosa K. Monsecour & D. Monsecour, 2018
- Sulcomitrella imbecillis K. Monsecour & D. Monsecour, 2016
- Sulcomitrella imperfecta K. Monsecour & D. Monsecour, 2016
- † Sulcomitrella januskiewiczi (Friedberg, 1938)
- Sulcomitrella kanamaruana (Kuroda, 1953)
- Sulcomitrella leylae K. Monsecour & D. Monsecour, 2018
- Sulcomitrella macdonaldensis K. Monsecour & D. Monsecour, 2018
- Sulcomitrella monodonta (Habe, 1958)
