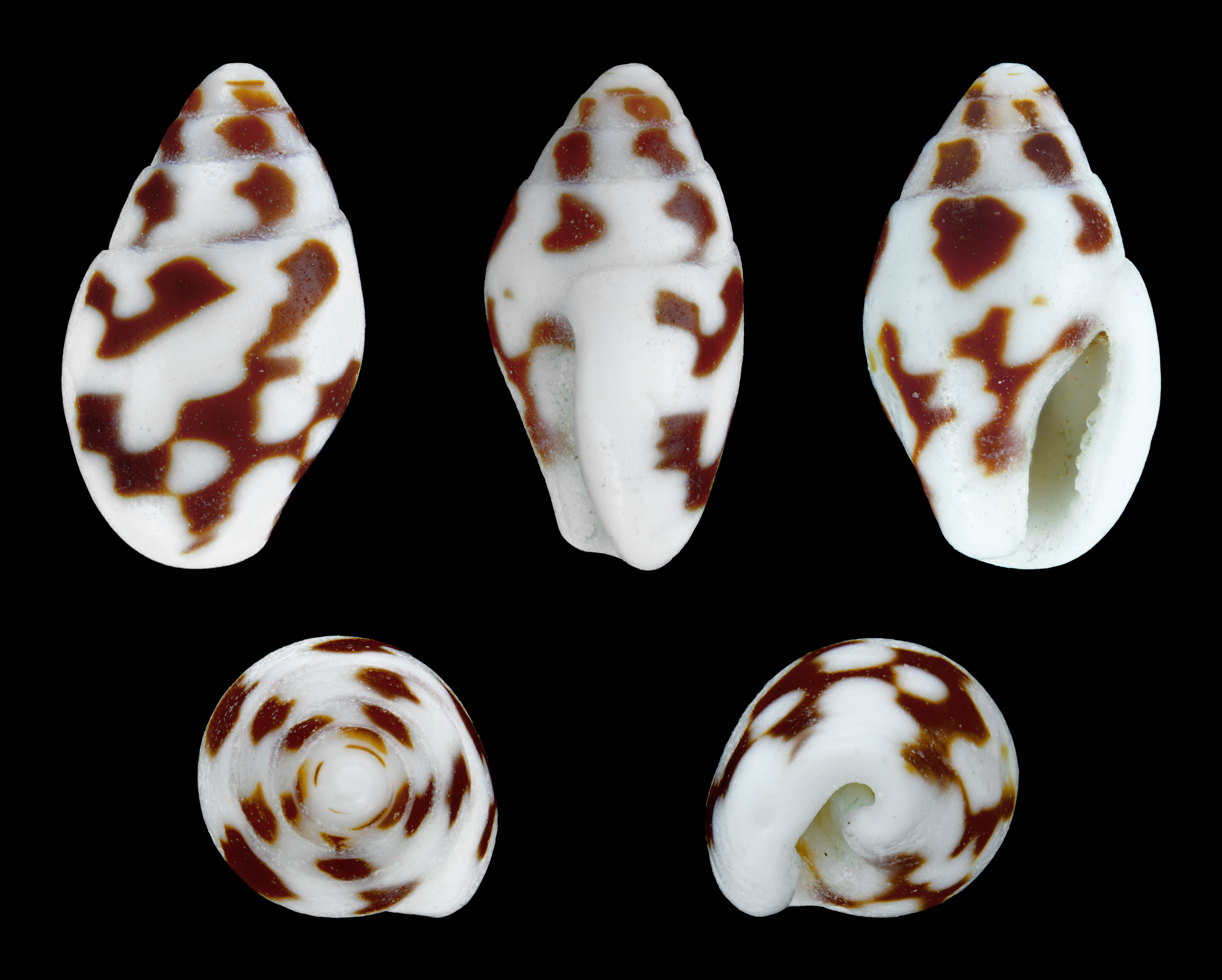
- Pardalinops testudinaria (Link, 1807)

Scientific classification
- Kingdom: Animalia
- Phylum: Mollusca
- Class: Gastropoda
- Subclass: Caenogastropoda
- Order: Neogastropoda
- Superfamily: Buccinoidea
- Family: Columbellidae
- Genus: Pardalinops; De Maintenon, 2008

Type species
- Columbella pardalina Lamarck, 1822

Synonyms
- Pardalina Jousseaume, 1888 (Invalid: Junior homonym of Pardalina Gray, 1867 [Mammalia])

= Pardalinops =

Genus of gastropods

Pardalinops is a genus of sea snails, marine gastropod mollusks in the family Columbellidae; the dove snails.

== Species ==
Species within the genus Pardalinops include:

- Pardalinops aspersa (G.B. Sowerby I, 1844)
- Pardalinops borroni Thach, 2018
- Pardalinops fabula (G. B. Sowerby I, 1844)
- Pardalinops marmoratus (Gray, 1839)
- Pardalinops propinquus (Smith, 1891)
- Pardalinops testudinarius (Link, 1807)

Synonyms

- Pardalinops jousseaumei (Drivas & Jay, 1997): synonyms of Pardalinops propinquus (E. A. Smith, 1891) (junior subjective synonym)
