= Parvanachis ostreicola =

Scientific classification
- Kingdom: Animalia
- Phylum: Mollusca
- Class: Gastropoda
- Subclass: Caenogastropoda
- Order: Neogastropoda
- Family: Columbellidae
- Genus: Parvanachis
- Species: P. ostreicola

Binomial name
- Parvanachis ostreicola (Sowerby III, 1882)

Species of gastropod

Parvanachis ostreicola is a species of sea snail, a marine gastropod mollusc in the family Columbellidae, the dove snails.
