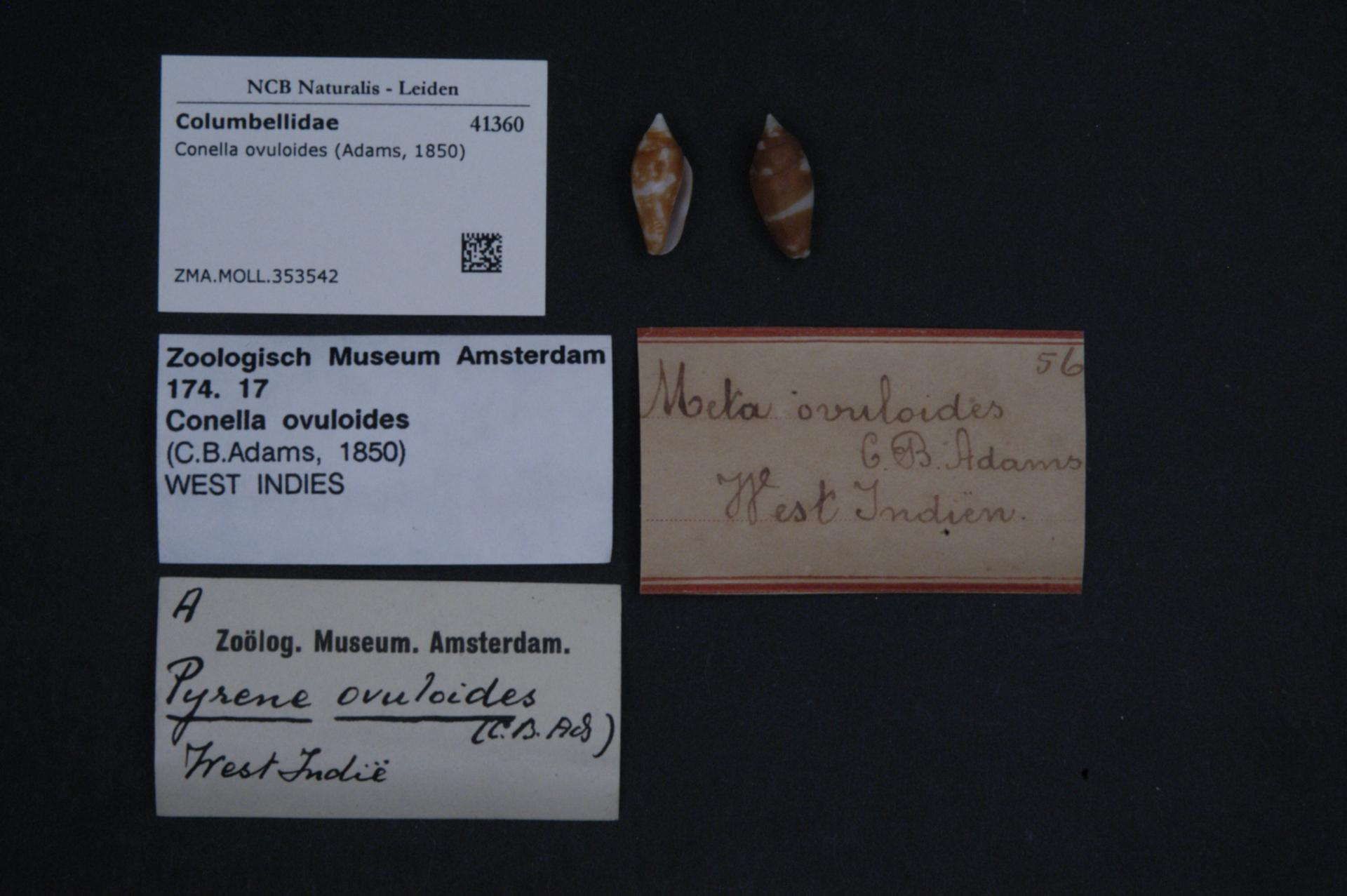

Scientific classification
- Kingdom: Animalia
- Phylum: Mollusca
- Class: Gastropoda
- Subclass: Caenogastropoda
- Order: Neogastropoda
- Family: Columbellidae
- Genus: Conella
- Species: C. ovuloides

Binomial name
- Conella ovuloides (C. B. Adams, 1850)

= Conella ovuloides =

Species of gastropod

Conella ovuloides is a species of sea snail, a marine gastropod mollusc in the family Columbellidae, the dove snails.
