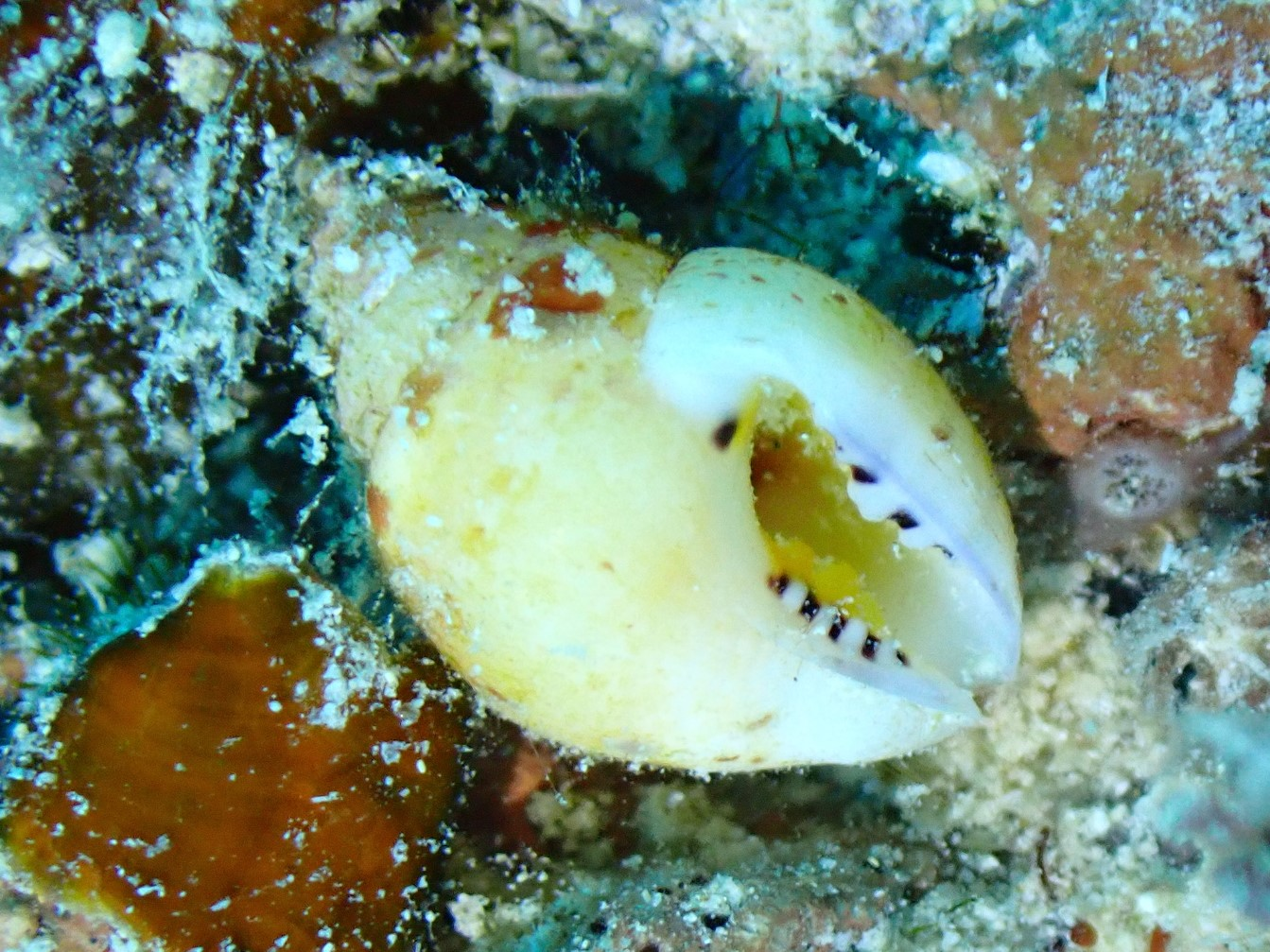

Scientific classification
- Kingdom: Animalia
- Phylum: Mollusca
- Class: Gastropoda
- Subclass: Caenogastropoda
- Order: Neogastropoda
- Family: Columbellidae
- Genus: Euplica
- Species: E. brunnidentata

Binomial name
- Euplica brunnidentata de Maintenon, 2008

= Euplica brunnidentata =

Species of gastropod

Euplica brunnidentata is a species of sea snail, a marine gastropod mollusc in the dove snail family Columbellidae.
