= Sulcomitrella aikeni =

Scientific classification
- Kingdom: Animalia
- Phylum: Mollusca
- Class: Gastropoda
- Subclass: Caenogastropoda
- Order: Neogastropoda
- Family: Columbellidae
- Genus: Sulcomitrella
- Species: S. aikeni

Binomial name
- Sulcomitrella aikeni (Lussi, 2009)

Synonyms
- Pyrene aikeni Lussi, 2009 (basionym)

Species of gastropod

Sulcomitrella aikeni is a species of sea snail, a marine gastropod mollusc in the family Columbellidae, the dove snails.
