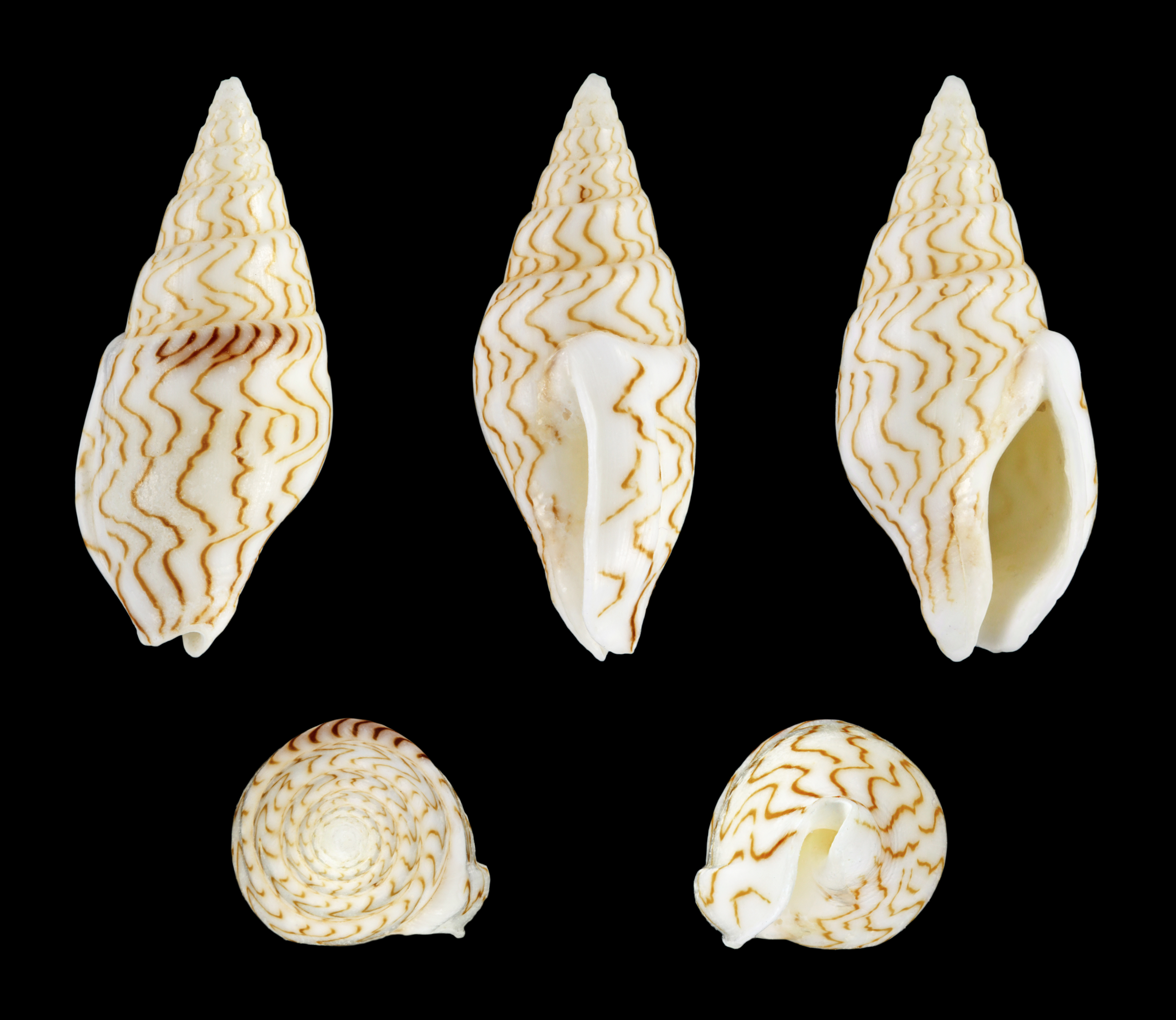

Scientific classification
- Kingdom: Animalia
- Phylum: Mollusca
- Class: Gastropoda
- Subclass: Caenogastropoda
- Order: Neogastropoda
- Family: Columbellidae
- Genus: Mitrella
- Species: M. blanda

Binomial name
- Mitrella blanda G.B. Sowerby, 1844

Synonyms
- Columbella blanda G.B. Sowerby, 1844 (basionym); Columbella blanda var. candidans Melvill & Standen, 1901; Columbella bourjotiana Crosse, 1859; Columbella doriae Issel, 1866; Pyrene blanda (Sowerby, 1844)

= Mitrella blanda =

Species of gastropod

Mitrella blanda is a species of sea snail in the family Columbellidae, the dove snails.
