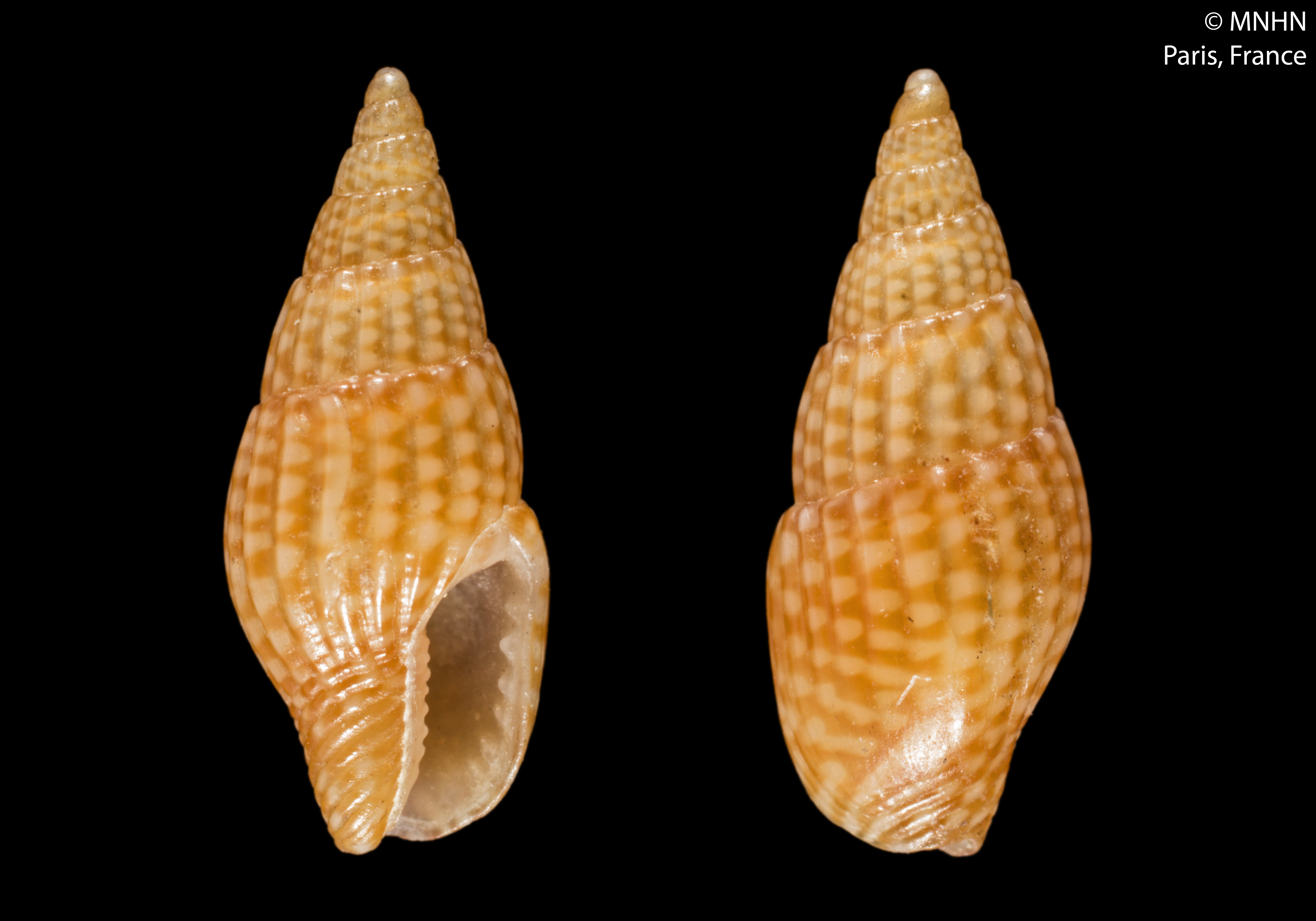
- Shell of Anachis freytagi (syntype at MNHN, Paris)

Scientific classification
- Kingdom: Animalia
- Phylum: Mollusca
- Class: Gastropoda
- Subclass: Caenogastropoda
- Order: Neogastropoda
- Family: Columbellidae
- Genus: Anachis
- Species: A. freitagi

Binomial name
- Anachis freitagi (von Maltzan, 1884)

Synonyms
- Columbella bubakensis Lamy, 1822; Columbella freytagi Maltzan, 1884 (basionym); Columbella oselmonta Duclos, 1835; Pyrene freytagi (Maltzan, 1884)

= Anachis freytagi =

Anachis freitagi

Species of gastropod

Anachis freitagi is a species of sea snail in the family Columbellidae, the dove snails.

== Description ==
The shell grows to a length of 7 mm.

== Distribution ==
This species is distributed in the Atlantic Ocean along Angola, Senegal and Ghana
