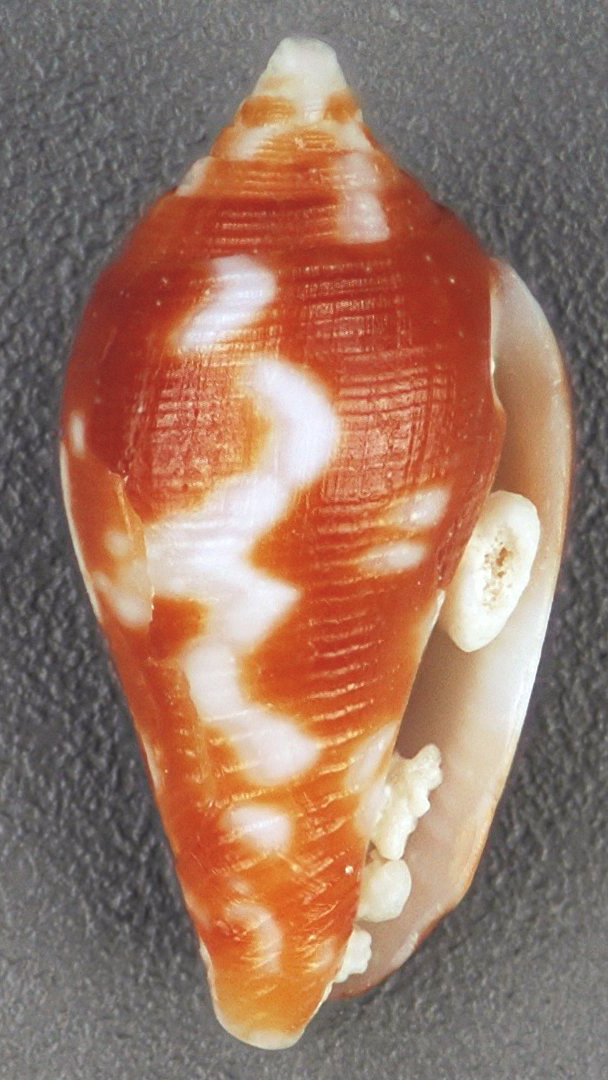
- Conella ovulata shell

Scientific classification
- Kingdom: Animalia
- Phylum: Mollusca
- Class: Gastropoda
- Subclass: Caenogastropoda
- Order: Neogastropoda
- Family: Columbellidae
- Genus: Conella
- Species: C. ovulata

Binomial name
- Conella ovulata (Lamarck, 1822)

= Conella ovulata =

Species of gastropod

Conella ovulata is a species of sea snail, a marine gastropod mollusc in the family Columbellidae, the dove snails.
