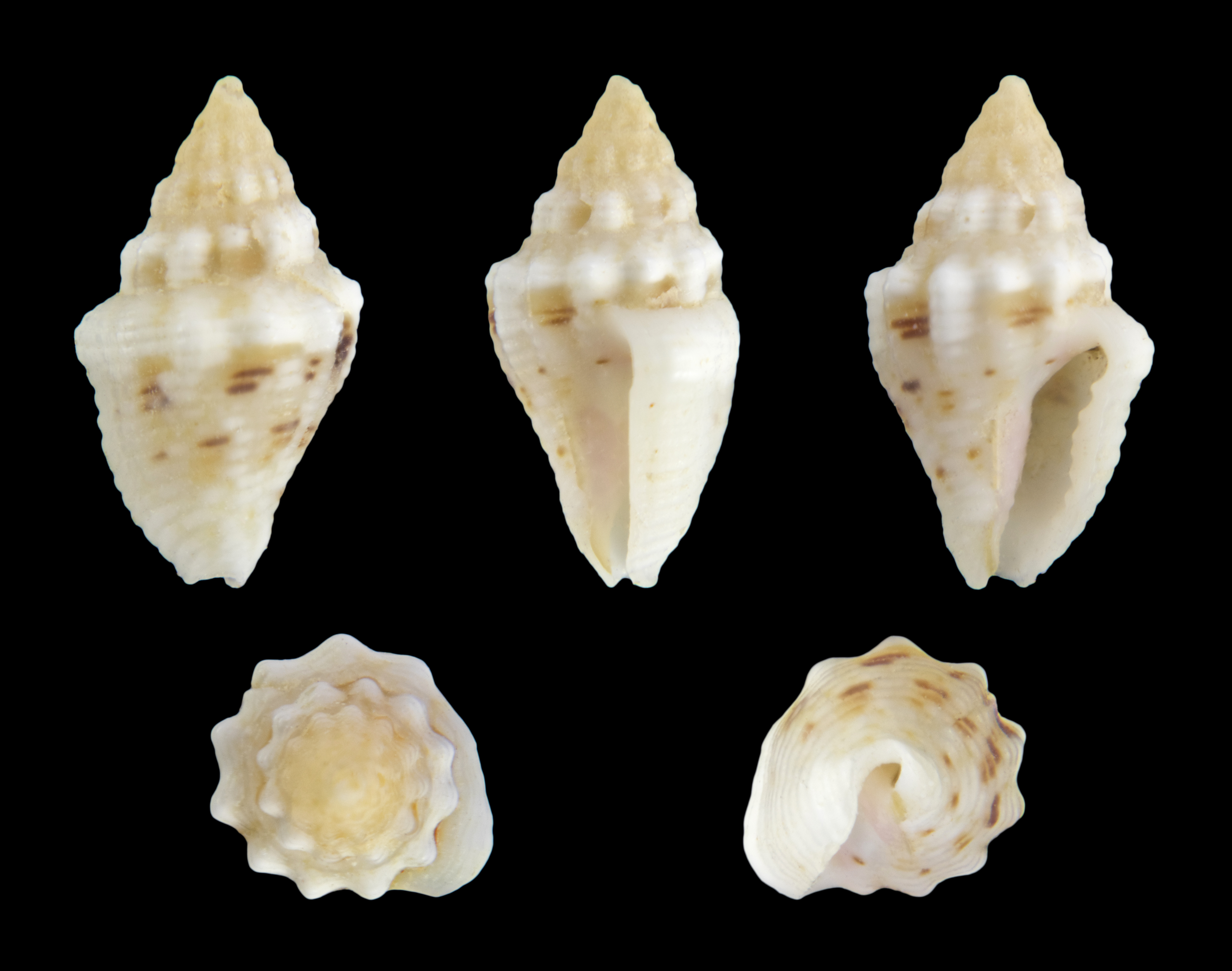

Scientific classification
- Kingdom: Animalia
- Phylum: Mollusca
- Class: Gastropoda
- Subclass: Caenogastropoda
- Order: Neogastropoda
- Family: Columbellidae
- Genus: Euplica
- Species: E. varians

Binomial name
- Euplica varians G.B. Sowerby II, 1832

Synonyms
- Columbella varians G.B. Sowerby II, 1832; Columbella nodulosa Nowell-Usticke, G.W., 1959

= Euplica varians =

Species of gastropod

Euplica varians is a species of sea snail, a marine gastropod mollusk in the family Columbellidae, the dove snails. It is known as Momi in Hawaii, which translates to "pearl". The shells of this species are commonly used in leis in Niʻihau.

== Description ==
Euplica varians grows up to 11 mm long.

== Distribution ==
This species is found in the Indian Ocean along the East African coast and along northern KwaZuluNatal, in the Indo-West Pacific and Australia.

== Habitat ==
Euplica varians lives in shallow intertidal waters.
