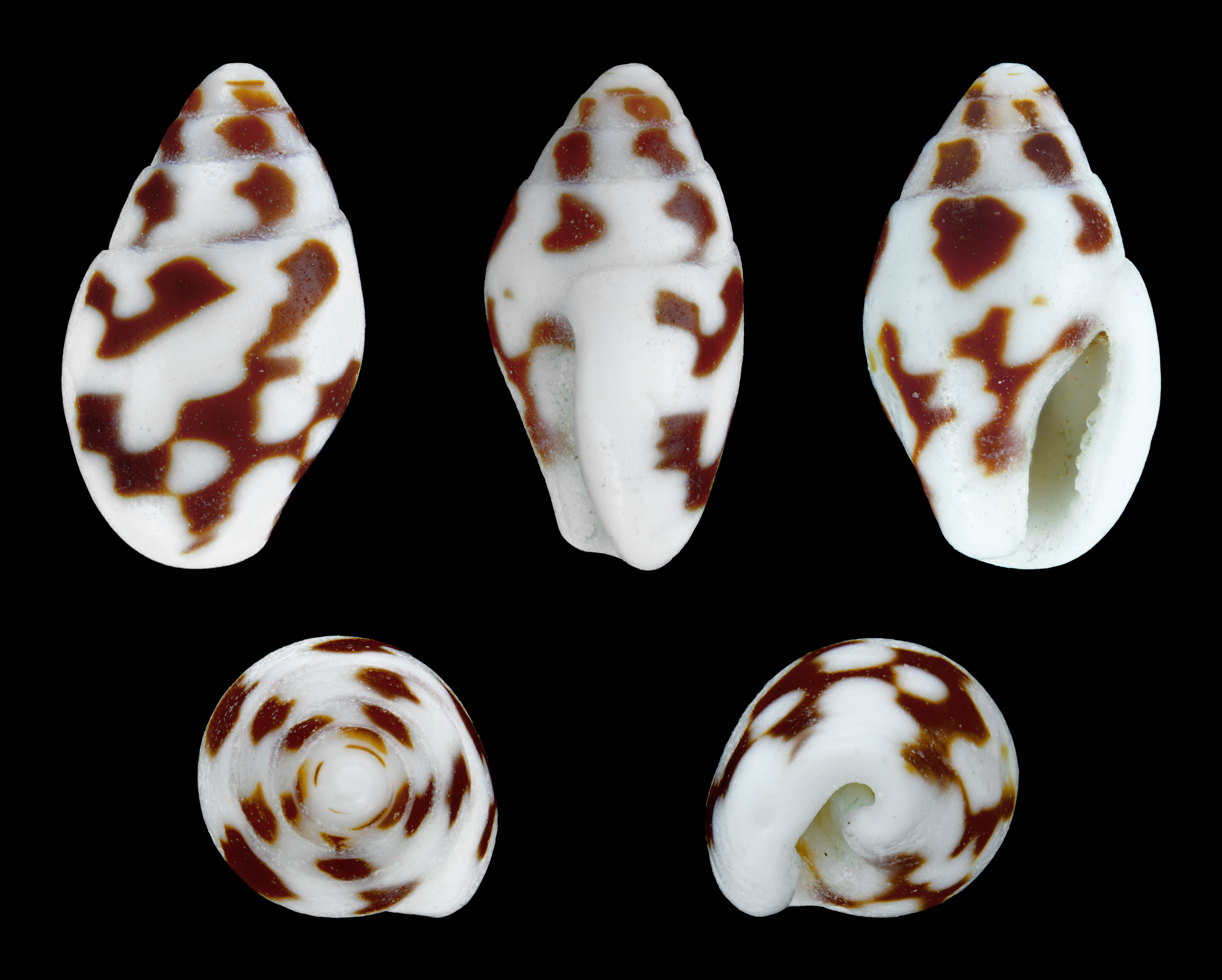

Scientific classification
- Kingdom: Animalia
- Phylum: Mollusca
- Class: Gastropoda
- Subclass: Caenogastropoda
- Order: Neogastropoda
- Family: Columbellidae
- Genus: Pardalinops
- Species: P. testudinarius

Binomial name
- Pardalinops testudinarius (Link, 1807)

Synonyms
- Columbella anitis Duclos, 1846; Columbella electroides Reeve, 1858; Columbella fabula G.B. Sowerby I, 1844; Columbella japonica Reeve, 1858; Columbella lactescens Souverbie, 1866; Columbella padonosta Duclos, 1835; Columbella palmerina Duclos, 1835; Columbella pardalina Lamarck, 1822; Columbella pardalina subcribraria Pilsbry, 1905 (suspected synonym); Columbella pardalina var. andamanica G. Nevill & H. Nevill, 1875; Columbella pardalina var. bifasciata Hervier, 1900; Columbella pardalina var. crocea Hervier, 1900; Columbella pardalina var. elongatula Hervier, 1900; Columbella pardalina var. fulgurata Hervier, 1900; Columbella pardalina var. lanc eolata Hervier, 1900; Columbella pardalina var. laxa Hervier, 1900; Columbella pardalina var. minor Hervier, 1900; Columbella pardalina var. nigrescens Hervier, 1900; Columbella pardalina var. picturata Hervier, 1900; Columbella pardalina var. sublactescen Hervier, 1900; Columbella pelotina Duclos, 1835; Columbella picta Reeve, 1859; Columbella quintilia Duclos, 1848; Columbella sagena Reeve, 1859; Columbella sulcata Duclos, 1835; Columbella testudinaria Link, 1807; Columbella tylerae Griffith & Pidgeon, 1834; Columbella virginea Duclos, 1835; Columbella vulpecula G.B. Sowerby I, 1844; Columbella zopilla Duclos, 1848; Pardalina testudinaria (Link, 1807); Pardalinops testudinaria (Link, 1807); Pyrene lacteoides Habe & Kosuge, 1966; Pyrene subcrebraria Pilsbry, 1905; Pyrene testudinaria (Link, 1807); Pyrene testudinaria nigropardalis Habe & Kosuge, 1966; Pyrene tylerae (Griffith & Pidgeon, 1834); Pyrene vulpecula (G. B. Sowerby I, 1844)

= Pardalinops testudinarius =

Species of gastropod

Pardalinops testudinarius, common name : the tortoise dove shell, is a species of sea snail, a marine gastropod mollusc in the family Columbellidae, the dove snails.

== Description ==
The shell size varies between 10 mm and 41 mm

(described as Columbella pardalina subcribraria) The shell is obesely fusiform and swollen in the middle. It is dark brown, closely spotted with white, and lacks a darker or otherwise differentiated subsutural band.

There are a few spiral striae at the base, but the surface is otherwise smooth. The shell contains 7 to 7½ whorls. The aperture is narrow and sinuous, and is more than half the length of the shell. The outer lip is decidedly thickened internally in the middle and is armed with about five tubercular or elongated teeth. The apex is entire, or nearly so.

== Distribution ==
This species occurs in the Red Sea, in the Indian Ocean off Tanzania; off the Philippines; in the Western Pacific Ocean and off Japan and Australia.
