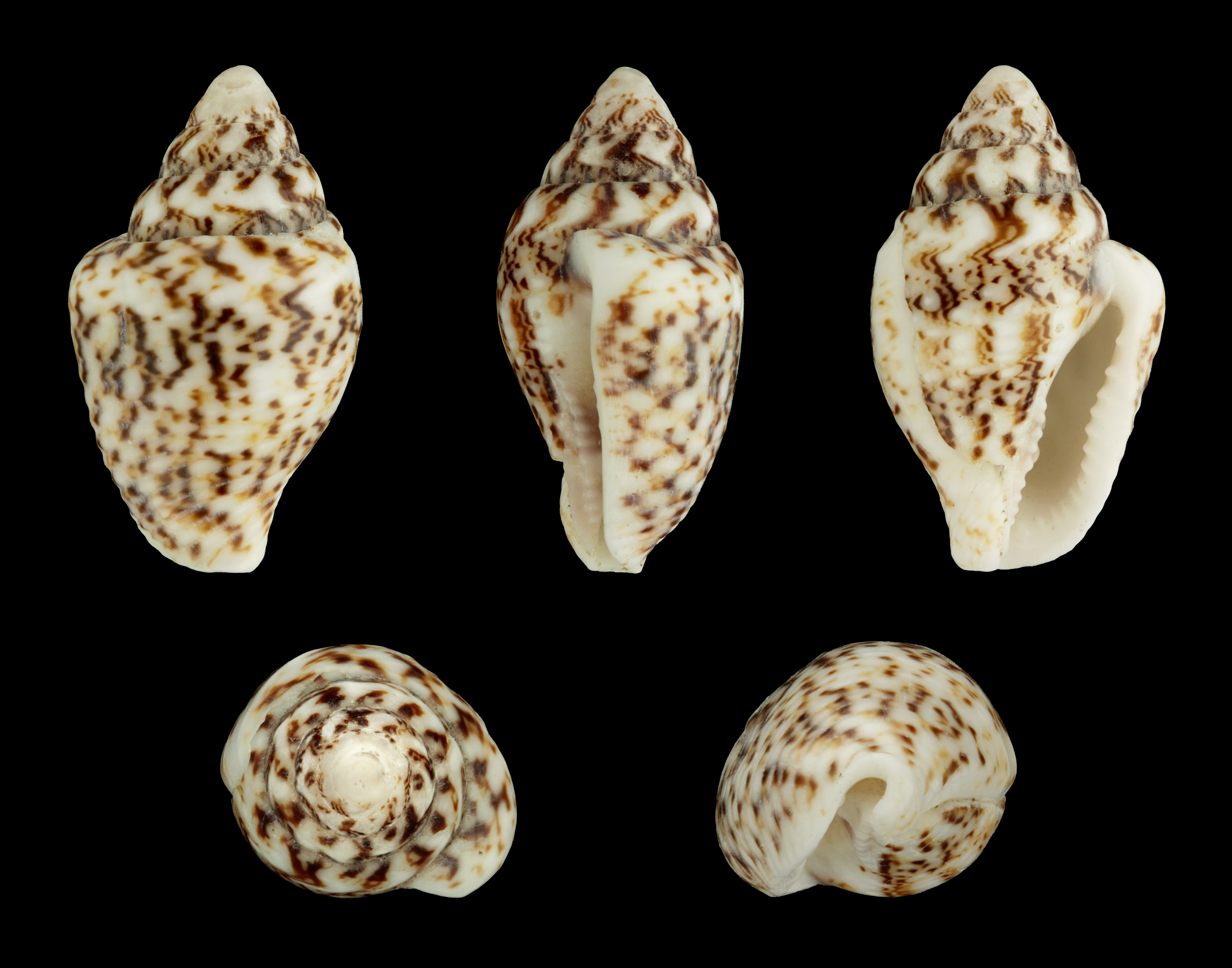

Scientific classification
- Kingdom: Animalia
- Phylum: Mollusca
- Class: Gastropoda
- Subclass: Caenogastropoda
- Order: Neogastropoda
- Family: Columbellidae
- Genus: Euplica
- Species: E. scripta

Binomial name
- Euplica scripta (Lamarck, 1822)

Synonyms
- Buccinum flexuosum Lamarck, 1822; Columbella araneosa Kiener, 1841; Columbella atladona Duclos, 1835; Columbella collaris Reeve, 1859; Columbella cornea Kiener, 1841; Columbella coronata Duclos, 1835; Columbella deveyrai Bartsch, 1918; Columbella idulia Duclos, 1835; Columbella nivosa Reeve, 1859; Columbella ouveensis Hervier, R.P.J., 1899; Columbella perlaevis G.B. Sowerby III, 1905; Columbella rasotia Duclos, 1835; Columbella scripta Lamarck, 1822; Columbella tigrina Duclos, 1835; Columbella versicolor G.B. Sowerby I, 1832; Columbella versicolor var. hebridarum Hervier, 1899; Columbella versicolor var. ouveensis Hervier, 1899; Euplica versicolor (G. B. Sowerby I, 1832); Mitrella (Mitrella) flexuosa Lamarck, J.B.P.A. de, 1822; Pyrene versicolor Sowerby, G.B. I, 1832; Voluta nasuta Gmelin, 1790

= Euplica scripta =

Species of gastropod

Euplica scripta, common name : the dotted dove shell, is a species of sea snail, a marine gastropod mollusk in the family Columbellidae, the dove snails.

== Description ==
The shell size varies between 9 mm and 22 mm

The oblong shell is subfusiform. The spire is turreted, conical and pointed. It is composed of seven or eight folded whorls, often tuberculated. The upper edge of each whorl is very slightly compressed, which renders the sutures but little apparent. The body whorl, with neither folds nor tubercles, is as large as all the others together, and striated at the base. The ground color of this shell is whitish, and there are delineated brown undulating or zigzag lines, more or less numerous, which descend from the top to the base of the whorls. Sometimes other bands upon the upper whorls form delicate rhombs. The aperture is rather narrow, attenuated at its lower extremity, and as long as the other whorls united. The columella is smooth, straight and entirely white like the rest of the interior of the aperture. The outer lip is indistinctly crenulated.

== Distribution ==
This species is distributed over the entire Indo-Pacific and off Sri Lanka, Vietnam and Australia.
