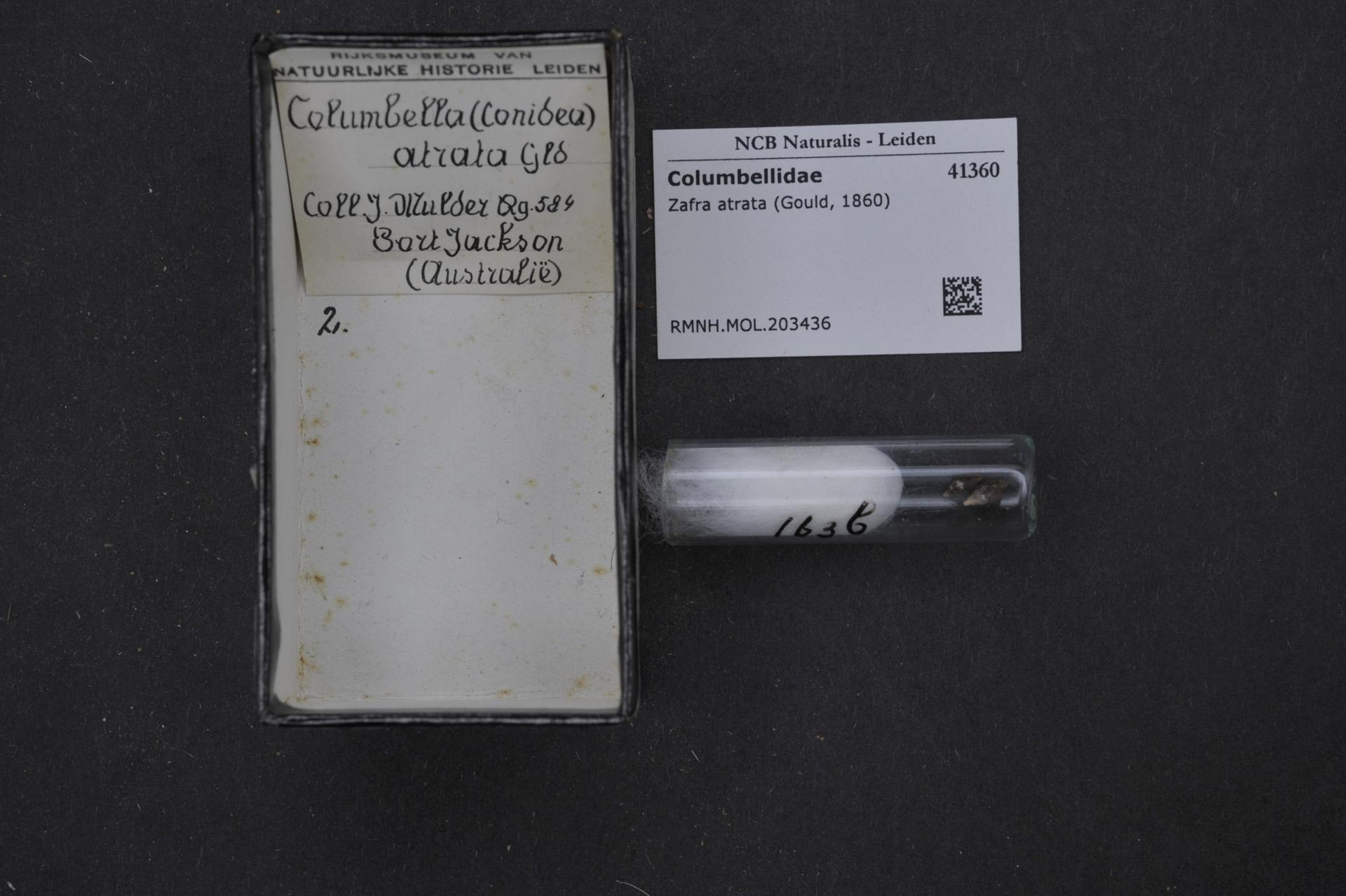
- Specimen of Zafra atrata at Naturalis Biodiversity Center

Scientific classification
- Kingdom: Animalia
- Phylum: Mollusca
- Class: Gastropoda
- Subclass: Caenogastropoda
- Order: Neogastropoda
- Superfamily: Buccinoidea
- Family: Columbellidae
- Genus: Zafra
- Species: Z. atrata

Binomial name
- Zafra atrata (Gould, 1860)

Synonyms
- Anachis atrata (A. Gould, 1860) superseded combination; Columbella (Anachis) atrata A. Gould, 1860 superseded combination; Columbella atrata A. Gould, 1860 superseded combination; Pyrene atrata (A. Gould, 1860) superseded combination

= Zafra atrata =

Species of gastropod

Zafra atrata is a species of sea snail in the family Columbellidae, the dove snails.

== Description ==
The length of the shell attains 5 mm.

(Original description in Latin) The small, thick shell has an ovate-lanceolate shape. Its color is anthracite. It is surrounded anteriorly by striae. The shell contains six swollen whorls, slightly flattened. The narrow aperture is posteriorly acute. The simple outer lip is posteriorly sinuous and is barely denticulated inside.

== Distribution ==
This marine species was found off South Africa and off Hong Kong Island.
