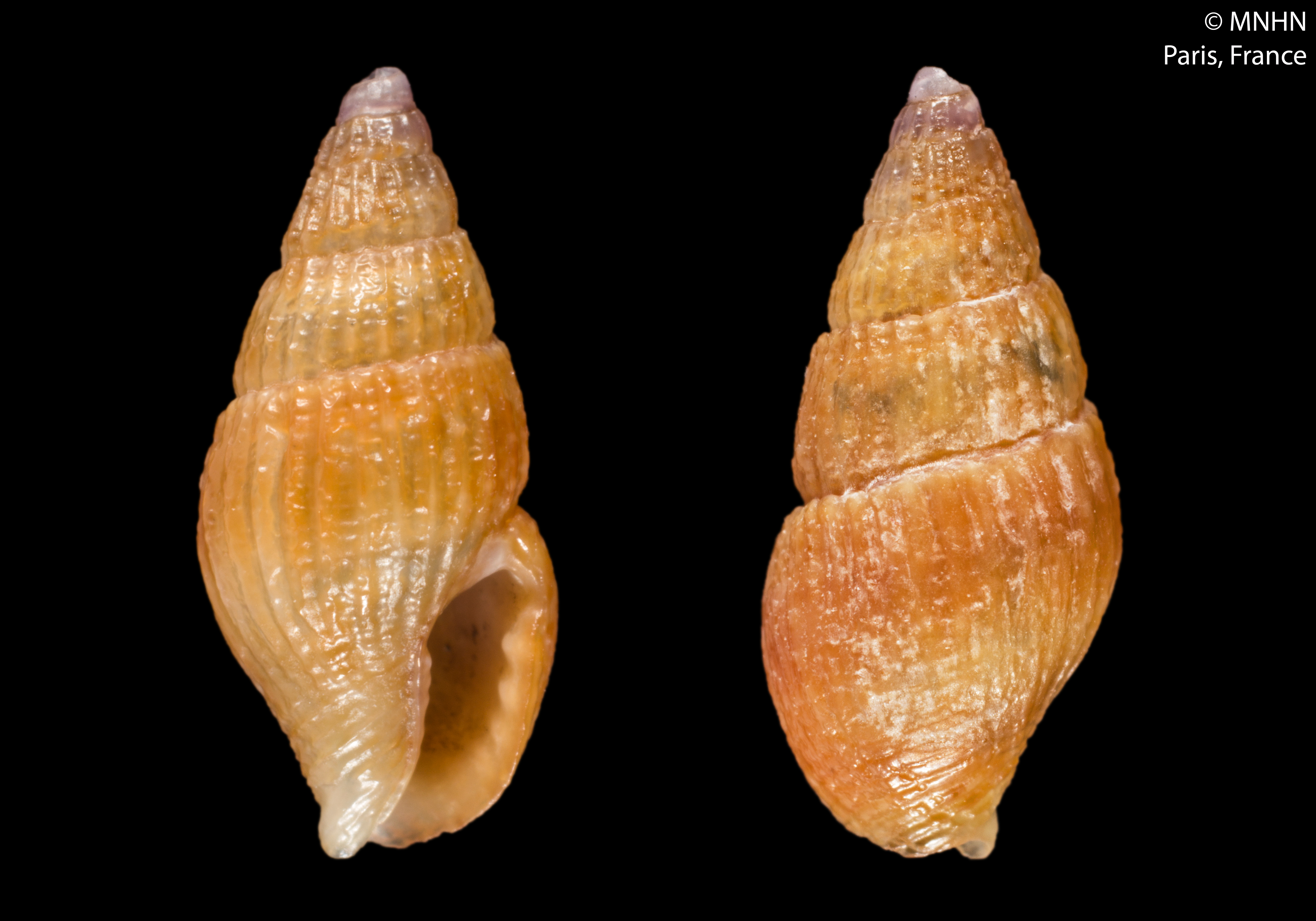
- Shell of Anachis cuspidata (specimen at the Natural History Museum Rotterdam)

Scientific classification
- Kingdom: Animalia
- Phylum: Mollusca
- Class: Gastropoda
- Subclass: Caenogastropoda
- Order: Neogastropoda
- Family: Columbellidae
- Genus: Anachis
- Species: A. cuspidata

Binomial name
- Anachis cuspidata (Marrat, 1877)

Synonyms
- Columbella (Anachis) cuspidata Marrat, 1877 superseded combination; Columbella cuspidata Marrat, 1877 superseded combination; Pyrene (Anachis) emergens Fischer-Piette & Nicklès, 1946 junior subjective synonym; Pyrene emergens Fischer-Piette & Nicklès, 1946 junior subjective synonym

= Anachis cuspidata =

Species of gastropod

Anachis cuspidata is a species of sea snail in the family Columbellidae, the dove snails.

== Description ==
The length of the shell attains 8 mm.

(Original description in Latin) The shell is elongated-spindle-shaped, tapering at both ends, with a pointed spire. The whorls are longitudinally ribbed and transversely grooved, with the ribs being somewhat granular. It is tawny, spotted with brown, or pale ash-gray, with a dusky epidermis. The columella is arched, its lip covered with a circumscribed callus. The aperture is narrow, and the outer lip is lirate (ridged) on the inside.

== Distribution ==
This species occurs off West Africa.
