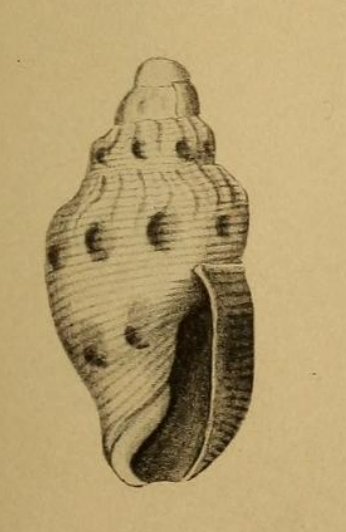
- Shell of Anachis fenestrata (holotype)

Scientific classification
- Kingdom: Animalia
- Phylum: Mollusca
- Class: Gastropoda
- Subclass: Caenogastropoda
- Order: Neogastropoda
- Family: Columbellidae
- Genus: Anachis
- Species: A. fenestrata

Binomial name
- Anachis fenestrata (Verco, 1910)

Synonyms
- Pyrene fenestrata Verco, 1910 (original combination)

= Anachis fenestrata =

Species of gastropod

Anachis fenestrata is a species of sea snail in the family Columbellidae, the dove snails.

== Description ==
The length of the shell attains 3.4 mm, its diameter 1.65 mm.

(Original description) The shell is minute, consisting of five whorls, including a blunt protoconch of one and a half convex-whorls, ending abruptly by a scar. The spire-whorls are shouldered in the upper third; above this, they are sloping, and below this, they are vertical. The body whorl is voluminous, shouldered, subangulate at the periphery, and concavely contracted at the base.

The aperture is rhomboidal and contracted posteriorly. The siphonal canal is wide and deflected to the left. The outer lip is simple and thin, and the columella is straight and feebly bidentate.

The sculpture consists of short plicate tubercles extending from the suture to just beyond the shoulder, with sixteen present in the body whorl. The entire shell is closely and feebly spirally striate. There is a spiral row of translucent crescentic areas, convex forward, just above the sutures, resembling windows, as though formed by grinding away the opaque outer layer of the shell. Eight such areas are visible in the body whorl, with the spiral striae showing like scratches in the glass. There is a second series of them just below the periphery, becoming a broad translucent band towards the lip margin.

The color is opaque-white, with a small, obscure pale-brown blotch in the lower half of the lower series of windows.

== Distribution ==
This species is endemic to Australia and occurs off South Australia.
