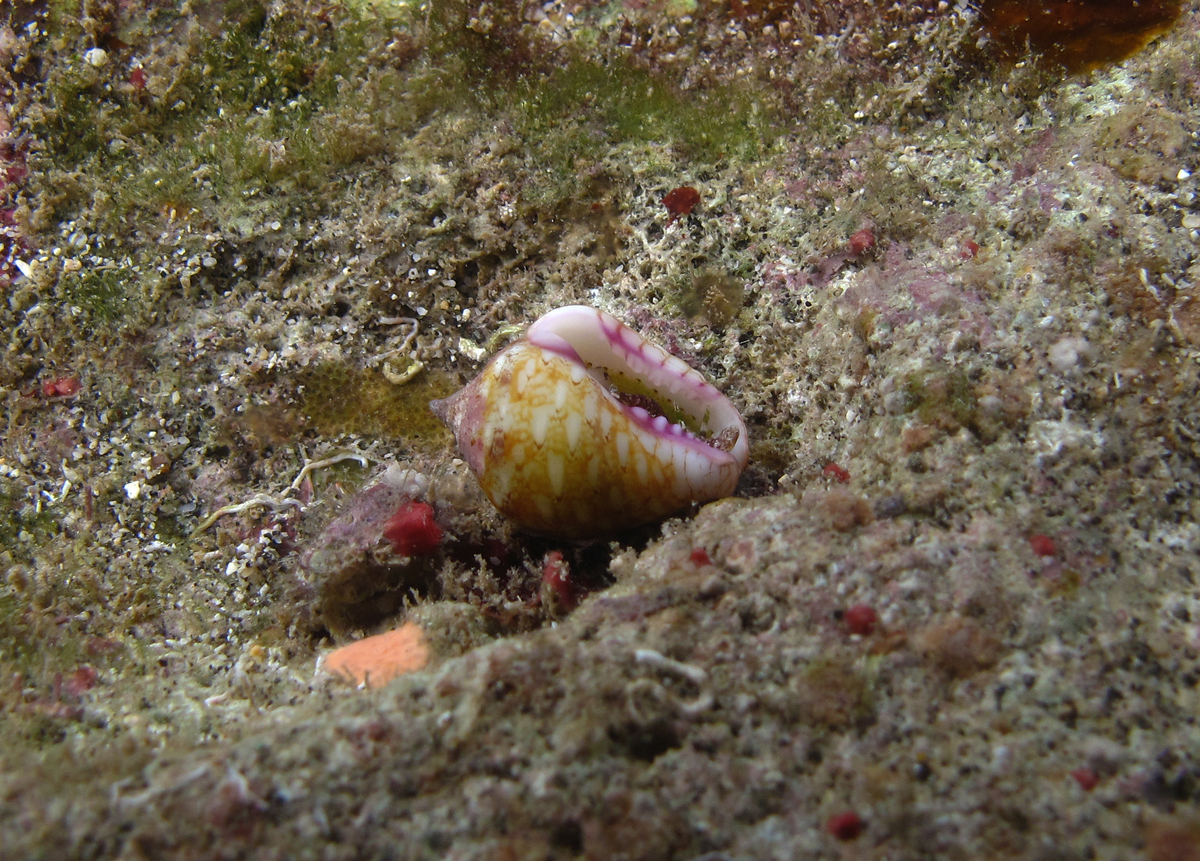

Scientific classification
- Kingdom: Animalia
- Phylum: Mollusca
- Class: Gastropoda
- Subclass: Caenogastropoda
- Order: Neogastropoda
- Family: Columbellidae
- Genus: Euplica
- Species: E. turturina

Binomial name
- Euplica turturina (Lamarck, 1822)

Synonyms
- Columbella palumbina Gould, 1845; Columbella sandwichensis Pease, 1861; Columbella turturina Lamarck, 1822 (basionym); Pyrene turturina (Lamarck, 1822)

= Euplica turturina =

Species of gastropod

Euplica turturina, common name : the turtle dove shell, is a species of small sea snail, a marine gastropod mollusk in the family Columbellidae, the dove snails.

== Description ==
The shell size varies between 0.9cm and 1.6cm.

== Distribution ==
This species has been found in the Indian Ocean along East Africa, North Transkei, Aldabra, Chagos, Madagascar, Mozambique and in the Indo-West Pacific.
