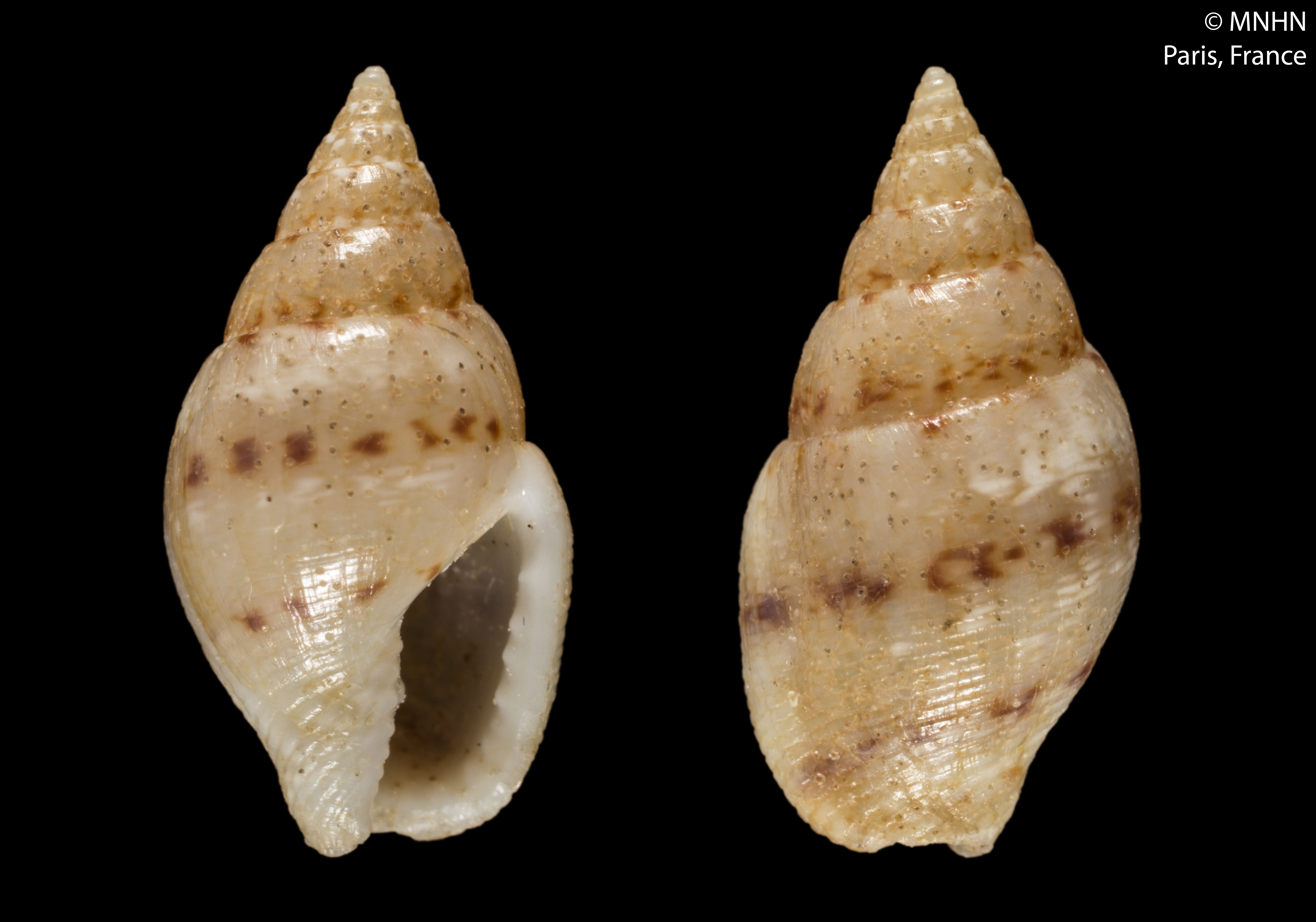
- Shell of Euplica festiva (neotype at MNHN, Paris)

Scientific classification
- Kingdom: Animalia
- Phylum: Mollusca
- Class: Gastropoda
- Subclass: Caenogastropoda
- Order: Neogastropoda
- Family: Columbellidae
- Genus: Euplica
- Species: E. festiva

Binomial name
- Euplica festiva (Deshayes, G.P. in Laborde, L.E.J. & M. Linant, 1834)

Synonyms
- Columbella (Nitidella) seychellarum E. von Martens, 1904 (basionym); Columbella albinodulosa Gaskoin, 1851; Columbella albinodulosa ogasawarana Pilsbry, H.A., 1904; Columbella azora Duclos, 1835; Columbella festiva de Laborde, 1928; Columbella festiva Deshayes, 1834 (original combination); Columbella indica Reeve, 1858; Columbella seychellarum Martens, 1903; Euplica reticulata Cossigani, 2005; Pyrene azora (Duclos, 1840)

= Euplica festiva =

Species of gastropod

Euplica festiva is a species of sea snail, a marine gastropod mollusk in the family Columbellidae, the dove snails.

== Description ==
The shell size varies between 7 mm and 11 mm.

== Distribution ==
This species occurs in the Red Sea, the Gulf of Aden, the Indian Ocean along Chagos, Madagascar, the Seychelles, and Réunion, and along West India, the Bonin Islands, and south of Japan.

- Kilburn R.N. & Marais J.P. (2010) Columbellidae. Pp. 60-104, in: Marais A.P. & Seccombe A.D. (eds), Identification guide to the seashells of South Africa. Volume 1. Groenkloof: Centre for Molluscan Studies. 376 pp.
