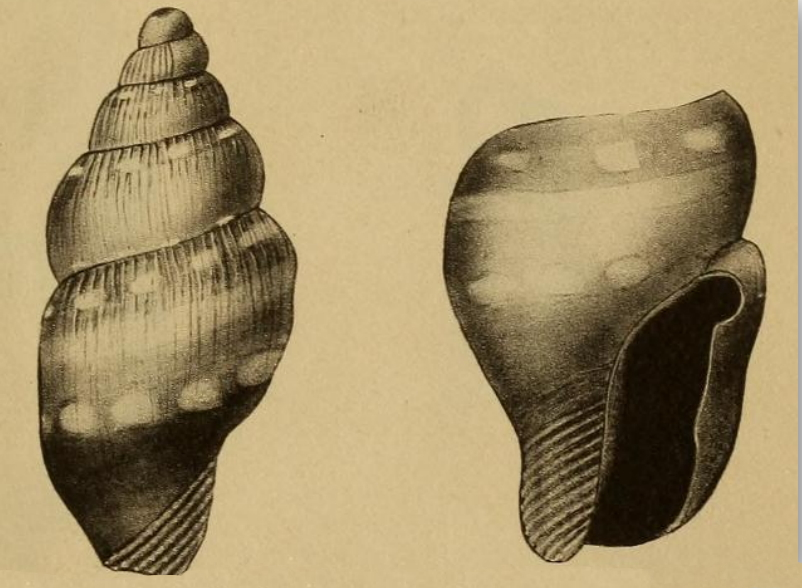
- Shell of Anachis beachportensis (holotype)

Scientific classification
- Kingdom: Animalia
- Phylum: Mollusca
- Class: Gastropoda
- Subclass: Caenogastropoda
- Order: Neogastropoda
- Family: Columbellidae
- Genus: Anachis
- Species: A. beachportensis

Binomial name
- Anachis beachportensis (Verco, 1910)

Synonyms
- Pyrene beachportensis Verco, 1910 (original combination)

= Anachis beachportensis =

Species of gastropod

Anachis beachportensis is a species of sea snail in the family Columbellidae, the dove snails.

== Description ==
The length of the shell attains 4 mm, its diameter 1.8 mm.

(Original description) The shell is small and solid, consisting of five whorls, including a blunt protoconch of two round, smooth whorls ending abruptly. The suture is linear and distinct, ascending at the aperture. The spire-whorls are convex below the suture; the first two slope towards the lower suture, and the third is somewhat contracted. The body whorl is large and convex, roundly contracted at the base, with a moderately long pillar.

The aperture is obliquely axially rhomboidal, with a distinct gutter below the suture. The outer lip is swollen below the suture, corresponding with the gutter, then appears straight or slightly impressed, and is anteriorly curved with a shallow infrasutural sinus in its border. The inner lip is distinct and complete. The columella is straight in its upper half and is bent to the left in its lower half. The siphonal canal is open and notched.

The sculpture consists of slightly rude axial growth lines, and eleven spirals wind from the inner lip around the snout. The ornament is amber colored, with a spiral of large opaque white spots below the suture. Beneath this, a narrow continuous white band is present, and a second spiral of larger spots starts from the back of the aperture. The area between the continuous band and the front of this spiral row of spots is translucent white. A dark spot is visible on the apex.

== Distribution ==
This species is endemic to Australia and occurs off South Australia, Tasmania, Victoria and Western Australia.
