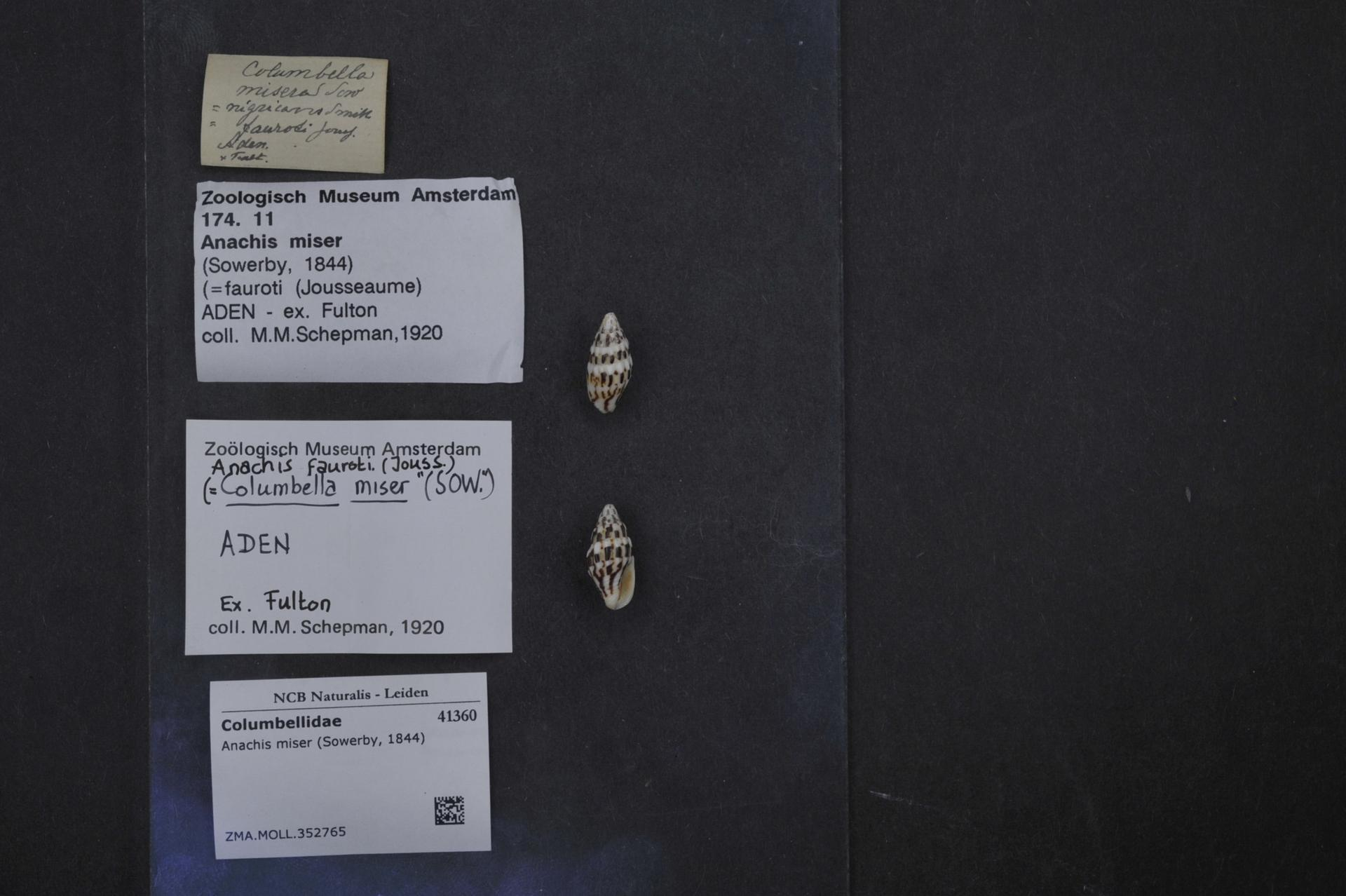

Scientific classification
- Kingdom: Animalia
- Phylum: Mollusca
- Class: Gastropoda
- Subclass: Caenogastropoda
- Order: Neogastropoda
- Family: Columbellidae
- Genus: Anachis
- Species: A. miser

Binomial name
- Anachis miser (G. B. Sowerby II, 1844)

Synonyms
- Buccinum zebra Wood, 1828 (non Müller, 1774); Columbella japonica Martens, 1897; Columbella miser G. B. Sowerby I, 1844 (original combination); Columbella miser var. nigromaculata Tomlin, 1915; Columbella nigricostata Smith, 1878; Columbella polynyma Pilsbry, 1901; Columbella zebra (Wood, 1828); Pyrene felina Hedley, 1915; Pyrene zebra (Wood, 1828)

= Anachis miser =

Species of gastropod

Anachis miser is a species of sea snail in the family Columbellidae, the dove snails.

Subspecies

- Anachis miser miser (G. B. Sowerby I, 1844)
- Anachis miser nigromaculata (Tomlin, 1915)
- Anachis miser polynyma (Pilsbry, 1901)

== Description ==
The length of the shell attains 16 mm.

(Original description) The shell is oblong-ovate, and appears whitish or yellowish. The spire is pyramidal. It comprises six whorls, which are rather convex and are speckled with chestnut in front. The five posterior whorls are longitudinally ribbed, while the anterior whorl is also ribbed, but its dorsal ribs are almost obsolete anteriorly. The aperture is rather broad and sub-rhomboidal. The denticles within the outer lip are few and small.

== Distribution ==
This marine species occurs off India, the Eastern Indian Ocean, in the Pacific Ocean off Hawaii, Oceania and off Australia (Northern Territory, Queensland, Western Australia).
