= Zafra hedleyi =

Scientific classification
- Kingdom: Animalia
- Phylum: Mollusca
- Class: Gastropoda
- Subclass: Caenogastropoda
- Order: Neogastropoda
- Superfamily: Buccinoidea
- Family: Columbellidae
- Genus: Zafra
- Species: Z. hedleyi

Binomial name
- Zafra hedleyi ((Thiele, 1930)

Synonyms
- Pyrene (Zafra) hedleyi Thiele, 1930 (original combination); Pyrene sagittifera Thiele, 1930

Species of gastropod

Zafra hedleyi is a species of sea snail in the family Columbellidae, the dove snails.

== Distribution ==
This marine species is endemic to Australia and occurs in Western Australia.
