= Mitrella dartevelli =

Scientific classification
- Kingdom: Animalia
- Phylum: Mollusca
- Class: Gastropoda
- Subclass: Caenogastropoda
- Order: Neogastropoda
- Family: Columbellidae
- Genus: Mitrella
- Species: M. dartevellei

Binomial name
- Mitrella dartevellei Knudsen, 1956

Synonyms
- Pyrene dartevelli Knudsen, 1956; Pyrene dartevilli Knudsen, 1958 (basionym)

Species of gastropod

Mitrella dartevelli is a species of sea snail in the family Columbellidae, the dove snails.

== Description ==
The shell grows to a length of 9.5 mm

== Distribution ==
This species is distributed in the Atlantic Ocean along Gabon.
