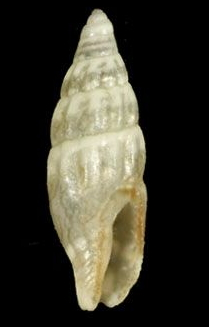
- Shell of Anachis atkinsoni (specimen at the Natural History Museum Rotterdam)

Scientific classification
- Kingdom: Animalia
- Phylum: Mollusca
- Class: Gastropoda
- Subclass: Caenogastropoda
- Order: Neogastropoda
- Family: Columbellidae
- Genus: Anachis
- Species: A. atkinsoni

Binomial name
- Anachis atkinsoni (Tenison Woods, 1876)

Synonyms
- Columbella speciosa Angas, 1877; Macrozafra dolicha (Verco, 1910); Mangelia atkinsoni Tenison Woods, 1876 superseded combination; Pyrene dolicha Verco, 1910 ·

= Anachis atkinsoni =

Species of gastropod

Anachis atkinsoni is a species of sea snail in the family Columbellidae, the dove snails.

== Description ==
The length of the shell attains 4 mm.

(Original description) The shell is small, ovately fusiform, somewhat tumid, white, and shining. It is clothed with a ferruginous epidermis. It is zoned with obtusely angular lines. The spire is mamillate. It comprises 6 whorls, which are ribbed, with valid, rounded ribs (six in the body whorl). The aperture is ovate and acute above. The outer lip is acute, and the inner lip is simple and replicate.

== Distribution ==
This species is endemic to Australia and occurs off New South Wales, Queensland, South Australia, Tasmania, Victoria and Western Australia.
