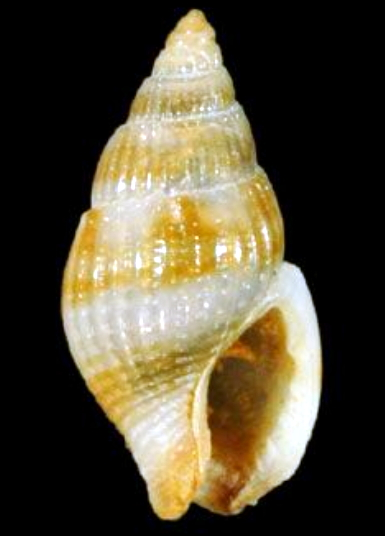
- Shell of Anachis isabellei (specimen at the Natural History Museum Rotterdam)

Scientific classification
- Kingdom: Animalia
- Phylum: Mollusca
- Class: Gastropoda
- Subclass: Caenogastropoda
- Order: Neogastropoda
- Family: Columbellidae
- Genus: Anachis
- Species: A. isabellei

Binomial name
- Anachis isabellei (A. d'Orbigny, 1839)

Synonyms
- Buccinum isabellei A. d'Orbigny, 1839 (original combination); Columbella (Seminella) melvillei Strebel, 1905 junior subjective synonym; Columbella melvillei Strebel, 1905; Nassa isabellei (A. d'Orbigny, 1839) superseded combination; Parvanachis isabellei (A. d'Orbigny, 1839); Pyrene isabellei (A. d'Orbigny, 1839); Pyrene melvillei (Strebel, 1905) ·

= Anachis isabellei =

Species of gastropod

Anachis isabellei is a species of sea snail in the family Columbellidae, the dove snails.

== Description ==
The shell attains a length of 6 mm, its diameter 2.5 mm.

(Original description in Latin) The white shell is oblong, longitudinally grooved and transversely striated. The spire is acute, with the body whorl somewhat smooth in the middle. The aperture is oval, smooth, and white.

== Distribution ==
This species occurs in the Atlantic Ocean off Brazil, Uruguay and Argentina.
