= Praya reticulata =

Scientific classification
- Kingdom: Animalia
- Phylum: Cnidaria
- Class: Hydrozoa
- Order: Siphonophorae
- Family: Prayidae
- Genus: Praya
- Species: P. reticulata

Binomial name
- Praya reticulata (Bigelow, 1911)

Synonyms
- Nectodroma reticulata Bigelow, 1911

Species of siphonophore

Praya reticulata is a species of siphonophore in the family Prayidae. It has a distinctive net of radial canals that make up its central cavity, a distinctive somatocyst that sharply doubles back, and asymmetrical canals on its bracts. The species was described by Henry Bryant Bigelow following its discovery during an expedition of the USS Albatross. The specific epithet reticulata is Latin, and comes from the word reticulatus which means "net-like". In Chinese the species is called 網管帕腊水母, which can be Romanized as wǎngguǎn pà là shuǐmǔ.

== Description ==
A colony of Praya reticulata can grow up to 100 centimetres (39 in) long. The nectophores that propel the siphonophore are apparent, with a size of roughly 5.5 cm in length and 2.0 cm in diameter, and extend past the base of the underside below the opening of the central cavity. The central cavity is made up of many radial canals that have numerous anastomoses and create a net-like or mesh-like pattern. There is a deep canal that runs along the length of the underside of the hydroecium, which may or may not be covered by flaps.

The somatocyst is one of the most distinctive features of P. reticulata. Its upper portion runs towards the front of the siphonophore, then sharply doubles back towards the rear. Lateral trunks branch off this portion, which sometimes branch out further at their ends. The bracts have unusually asymmetric canals, with the canal on the right side being much longer than the one on the left. The stems and bracts of P. reticulata seem to lack any swimming bell. Gonophores of females of the species are up to 1.3 cm long, while those of males are only 0.7 mm long. Both sexes have gonophores with an arrangement of branches that is unique among the Prayids, with three branches reaching outwards from the apex of the gonophore. The tentilla of the species lack the mouthless siphons and tentacles present in some other siphonophores.

Praya reticulata is most similar in appearance to Praya dubia. It can be told apart by its radial canals that create a mesh-like pattern, as opposed to the bifurcating canals of P. dubia. It also has a somewhat smaller central sac than P. dubia.

== History ==
During the USS Albatross scientific expedition in 1904–1905 to the Pacific Ocean, marine biologist Henry Bryant Bigelow was in charge of siphonophore collection and recording. He described several new species including Nectodroma reticulata in 1911, based on several collected nectophores and bracts. Bigelow created the new genus Nectodroma in order to contain this new species, as well as a related Prayid called Praya dubia. However, he later recognized that because P. dubia was the type species of Praya, it could not be moved into his new genus. He therefore affirmed this typification, and moved N. reticulata into Praya, giving its currently accepted name Praya reticulata.

Several times in the 2000s, colonies of Praya reticulata were observed using the DeepSee submersible. It is the only species of Praya to be positively identified this way because of the distinct appearance of its nectophores.

== Distribution, habitat, and ecology ==
Praya reticulata is found in the pelagic zone of warmer, subtropical waters with high salinity, such as the Kuroshio extension off the coast of Japan. Specimens have been collected globally, and Praya reticulata has a cosmopolitan distribution, excluding the Mediterranean Sea. It is found at a 3.5 times greater density in the summer than in the fall.

Despite fish–siphonophore interactions being generally rare, Praya reticulata has been spotted in association with a fish of the genus Paracaristius. In the association observed in 2010, a juvenile fish took shelter around the siphonophore, and likely attained prey by stealing from the siphonophore.
