= M. rosacea =

M. rosacea may refer to:

- Mitra rosacea, a sea snail species
- Mitrella rosacea, a sea snail species
- Mycteroperca rosacea, a grouper fish species from the Eastern Central Pacific

== See also ==
- Rosacea (disambiguation)
