= D. rosacea =

D. rosacea may refer to:

- Drillia rosacea, a sea snail species
- Ducula rosacea, the pink-headed imperial-pigeon, a bird species found in Indonesia and East Timor

== See also ==
- Rosacea (disambiguation)
