= Praya (disambiguation) =

Praya can be:

- Praya was a term used in colonial Hong Kong to refer to a promenade by the waterfront
- Praya, Lombok, a town in Indonesia
- Praya (cnidarian), a genus of siphonophores
