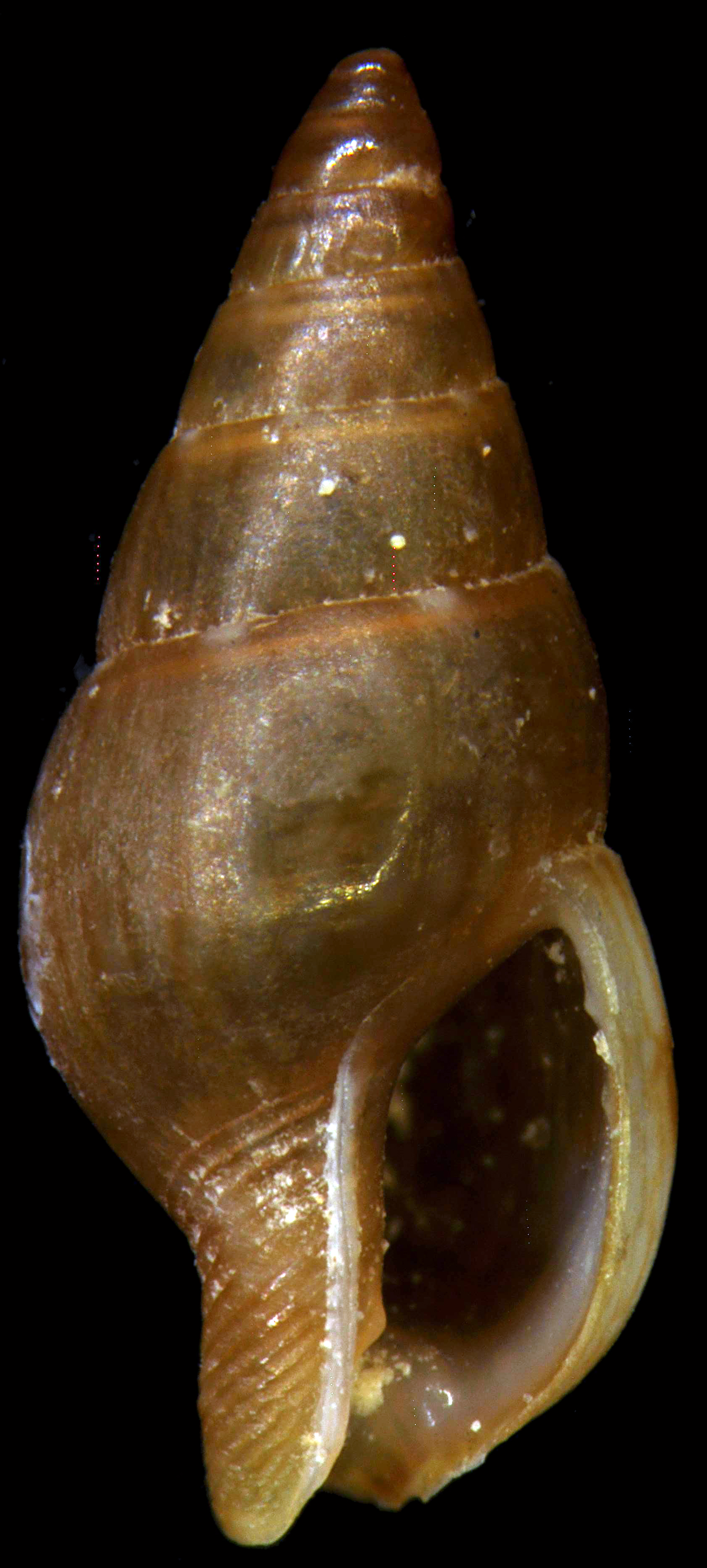
- Shell of Astyris crumena (holotype at MNHN, Paris)

Scientific classification
- Kingdom: Animalia
- Phylum: Mollusca
- Class: Gastropoda
- Subclass: Caenogastropoda
- Order: Neogastropoda
- Superfamily: Buccinoidea
- Family: Columbellidae
- Genus: Astyris; H. Adams & A. Adams, 1853

Type species
- Columbella rosacea (Gould, 1840)

Species
- See text

Synonyms
- Amycla (Astyris) H. Adams & A. Adams, 1853 (original rank); Astyris (Fluella) Dall, 1924· accepted, alternate representation; Columbella (Astyris) H. Adams & A. Adams, 1853

= Astyris =

Genus of gastropods

Astyris is a genus of sea snails, marine gastropod molluscs in the family Columbellidae, the dove snails.

== Species ==
Species within the genus Astyris include:

- Astyris amiantis Dall, 1919
- Astyris amphissella (Dall, 1881)
- Astyris angeli Espinosa, Fernandez-Garcès & Ortea, 2004
- Astyris appressa Dall, 1927
- Astyris bonariensis Castellanos & Deambrosi, 1967
- Astyris costata Gulbin, 1983
- Astyris crumena Dall, 1924
- Astyris delannoyei Pelorce, 2013
- Astyris diaphana A. E. Verrill, 1882
- Astyris elegans Gulbin, 1983
- Astyris embusa Dall, 1927
- Astyris enida Dall, 1927
- Astyris euribia Dall, 1927
- Astyris frumarkernorum Garcia, 2009
- Astyris georgiana Dall, 1927
- Astyris hervillardi Pelorce, 2012
- Astyris hypodra (Dall, 1916)
- Astyris joseantonioi Espinosa & Ortea, 2014
- Astyris kobai Golikov & Kussakin, 1962
- Astyris labecula Gould, 1862
- Astyris lunata (Say, 1826)
- Astyris multilineata (Dall, 1889)
- Astyris perlucida Dall, 1927
- Astyris profundi (Dall, 1889)
- Astyris projecta Dall, 1927
- Astyris pura A. E. Verrill, 1882
- Astyris raveneli (Dall, 1889)
- Astyris rolani Espinosa, Fernandez-Garcès & Ortea, 2004
- Astyris rosacea (Gould, 1840)
- Astyris sagenata Dall, 1927
- Astyris salmonea (Barnard, 1963)
- Astyris stemma Dall, 1927
- Astyris suavis (Smith, 1906)
- Astyris verrilli (Dall, 1881)
- Astyris vidua Dall, 1924

Species brought into synonymy

- Astyris antares (P. M. Costa & P. J. de Souza, 2001): synonym of Mitrella antares P. M. Costa & P. J. de Souza, 2001
- Astyris aurantiaca Dall, 1871: synonym of Alia aurantiaca (Dall, 1871)
- Astyris caletae Preston, 1915: synonym of Alia unifasciata (G. B. Sowerby I, 1832)
- Astyris gausapata (Gould, 1850): synonym of Alia gausapata (Gould, 1850)
- Astyris hartmanni Espinosa & Ortea, 2014: synonym of Minimanachis hartmanni (Espinosa & Ortea, 2014)
- Astyris permodesta (Dall, 1890): synonym of Alia permodesta (Dall, 1890)
- Astyris tuberosa (Carpenter, 1865): synonym of Mitrella tuberosa (Carpenter, 1865)
- Astyris zonalis Gould, 1848: synonym of Astyris lunata (Say, 1826)
