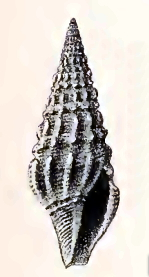
- Drawing with an apertural view of a shell of Drillia rosolina

Scientific classification
- Kingdom: Animalia
- Phylum: Mollusca
- Class: Gastropoda
- Subclass: Caenogastropoda
- Order: Neogastropoda
- Superfamily: Conoidea
- Family: Drilliidae
- Genus: Drillia
- Species: D. rosolina

Binomial name
- Drillia rosolina (Marrat F.P., 1877)

Synonyms
- Drillia (Clavus) rosolina Tryon, 1884; Clavus (Fenimorea) rosolina Nordsieck, 1977a; Pleurotoma (Drillia) rosolina Marrat, 1877

= Drillia rosolina =

Species of gastropod

Drillia rosolina is a species of sea snail, a marine gastropod mollusk in the family Drilliidae.

The species was unsatisfactory described by Frederick Price Marrat (1820-1904) and he didn't provide an image. According to Powell (1966) this species is a synonym of Drillia rosacea (Reeve, 1845).

== Description ==
The shell grows to a length of 25 mm. This species resembles Drillia rosacea, but is obliquely ribbed, closely striated, and of uniform rose color. The color, according to Philippe Dautzenberg, is variable and may also be whitish with a dark brown band on the body whorl.

== Distribution ==
This species occurs in the demersal zone of the Atlantic Ocean off Gabon.
