= Astyris profundi =

Scientific classification
- Kingdom: Animalia
- Phylum: Mollusca
- Class: Gastropoda
- Subclass: Caenogastropoda
- Order: Neogastropoda
- Family: Columbellidae
- Genus: Astyris
- Species: A. profundi

Binomial name
- Astyris profundi (Dall, 1889)

Synonyms
- Columbella profundi Dall, 1889 (basionym)

Species of gastropod

Astyris profundi is a species of sea snail, a marine gastropod mollusc in the family Columbellidae, the dove snails.

== Description ==
Astyris profundi shells are relatively smooth, with most of the sculpture limited to spiral threads around the base, and around the siphonal canal. The shell color is either clear or tan, and is somewhat translucent. Their shells can be up to 8 mm in size.

== Distribution ==
This deepwater species is distributed in the Atlantic Ocean, from off North Carolina to northern Cuba and the Caribbean Sea, occurring at depths between 200 and 500 meters. It is also reported from the Azores and Cape Verde. Sources disagree on whether the species occurs in the Gulf of Mexico: the Bailey-Matthews National Shell Museum states it "apparently is not found" there, while MolluscaBase lists a Gulf of Mexico gastropod checklist (Rosenberg, Moretzsohn & García, 2009) as a basis of record for the species. (Note: MolluscaBase cites Rosenberg, G., F. Moretzsohn, and E. F. García. 2009. Gastropoda (Mollusca) of the Gulf of Mexico, pp. 579–699 in Felder, D.L. and D.K. Camp (eds.), Gulf of Mexico–Origins, Waters, and Biota. Biodiversity. Texas A&M Press, College Station, Texas, as a basis of record, which would imply Gulf of Mexico occurrence; this is not explicitly confirmed in the checklist text itself as excerpted here.)

== Literature ==
- Rosenberg, G., F. Moretzsohn, and E. F. García. 2009. Gastropoda (Mollusca) of the Gulf of Mexico, pp. 579–699 in Felder, D.L. and D.K. Camp (eds.), Gulf of Mexico–Origins, Waters, and Biota. Biodiversity. Texas A&M Press, College Station, Texas
