= Astyris rolani =

Scientific classification
- Kingdom: Animalia
- Phylum: Mollusca
- Class: Gastropoda
- Subclass: Caenogastropoda
- Order: Neogastropoda
- Family: Columbellidae
- Genus: Astyris
- Species: A. rolani

Binomial name
- Astyris rolani Espinosa, Fernandez-Garcès & Ortea, 2004

Species of gastropod

Astyris rolani is a species of sea snail, a marine gastropod mollusc in the family Columbellidae, the dove snails.
