= Astyris multilineata =

Scientific classification
- Kingdom: Animalia
- Phylum: Mollusca
- Class: Gastropoda
- Subclass: Caenogastropoda
- Order: Neogastropoda
- Family: Columbellidae
- Genus: Astyris
- Species: A. multilineata

Binomial name
- Astyris multilineata (Dall, 1889)

Synonyms
- Mitrella multilineata (Dall, 1889)

Species of gastropod

Astyris multilineata is a species of sea snail, a marine gastropod mollusc in the family Columbellidae, the dove snails.
