= Nectopyramis =

Scientific classification
- Domain: Eukaryota
- Kingdom: Animalia
- Phylum: Cnidaria
- Class: Hydrozoa
- Order: Siphonophorae
- Family: Prayidae
- Genus: Nectopyramis; Bigelow, 1911

Genus of aquatic animals

Nectopyramis is a genus of hydrozoan belonging to the family Prayidae.

The genus has almost cosmopolitan distribution (oceans).

Species:

- Nectopyramis natans (Bigelow, 1911)
- Nectopyramis thetis Bigelow, 1911
