= Astyris verrilli =

Scientific classification
- Kingdom: Animalia
- Phylum: Mollusca
- Class: Gastropoda
- Subclass: Caenogastropoda
- Order: Neogastropoda
- Family: Columbellidae
- Genus: Astyris
- Species: A. verrilli

Binomial name
- Astyris verrilli (Dall, 1881)

Species of gastropod

Astyris verrilli is a species of sea snail, a marine gastropod mollusc in the family Columbellidae, the dove snails. It was discovered on a dredging expedition on the USC&GS George S. Blake, sometime between 1877 and 1878. It was named after Professor Addison Emery Verrill by William Healey Dall.
