= Rosacea (disambiguation) =

Rosacea may refer to:

- Rosacea, a human skin condition
- Rosacea (cnidarian), a genus of marine invertebrates in the family Prayidae

Not to be confused with:

- Rosaceae, a family of plants
