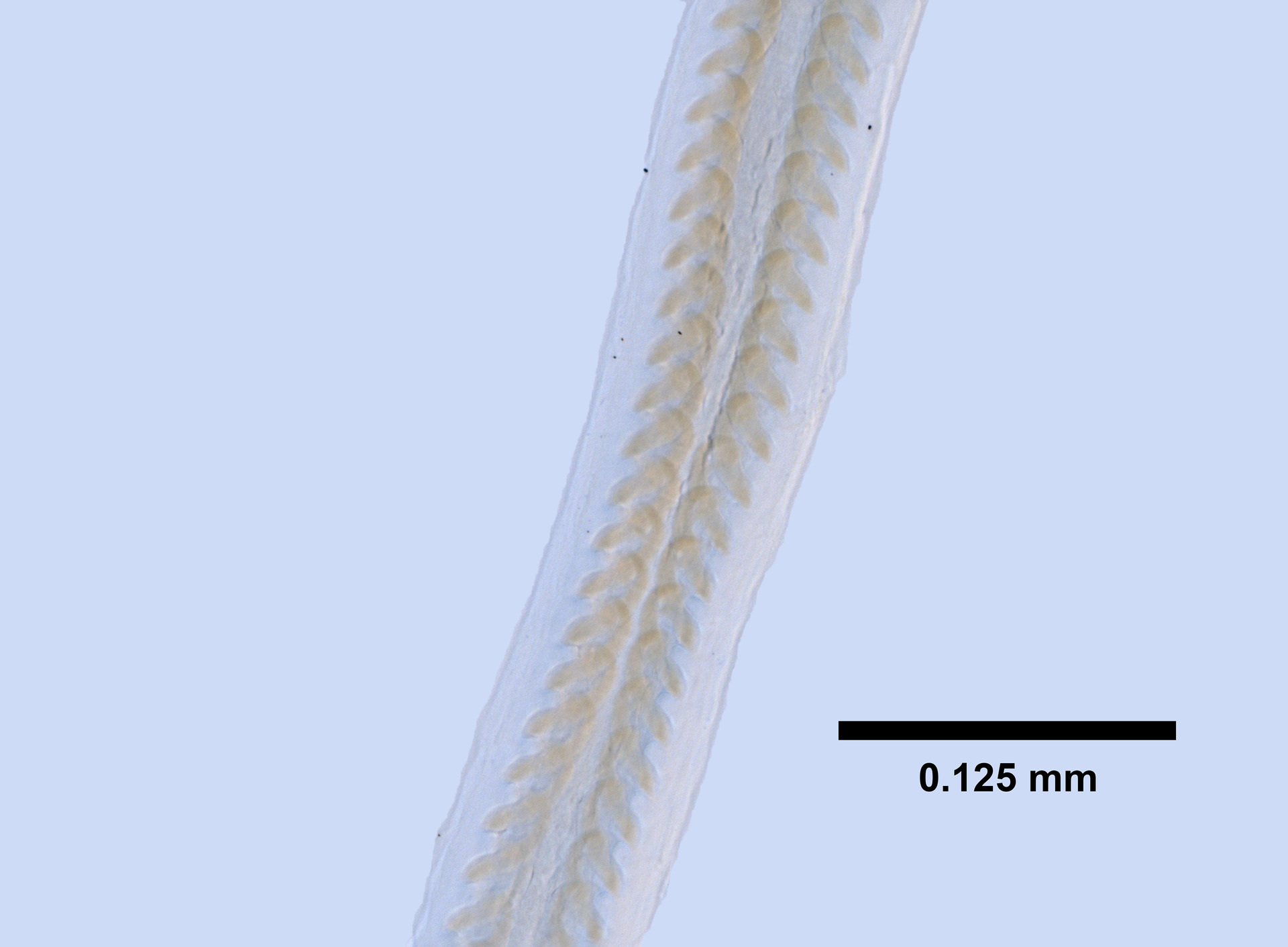

Scientific classification
- Kingdom: Animalia
- Phylum: Mollusca
- Class: Gastropoda
- Subclass: Caenogastropoda
- Order: Neogastropoda
- Family: Columbellidae
- Genus: Astyris
- Species: A. diaphana

Binomial name
- Astyris diaphana A. E. Verrill, 1882

= Astyris diaphana =

Species of gastropod

Astyris diaphana is a species of sea snail, a marine gastropod mollusc in the family Columbellidae, the dove snails.
