= Astyris pura =

Scientific classification
- Kingdom: Animalia
- Phylum: Mollusca
- Class: Gastropoda
- Subclass: Caenogastropoda
- Order: Neogastropoda
- Family: Columbellidae
- Genus: Astyris
- Species: A. pura

Binomial name
- Astyris pura A. E. Verrill, 1882

Synonyms
- Mitrella pura (A. E. Verrill, 1882)

Species of gastropod

Astyris pura Verrill, 1882

Astyris pura is a species of sea snail, a marine gastropod mollusc in the family Columbellidae, the dove snails.
