= Astyris amphissella =

Scientific classification
- Kingdom: Animalia
- Phylum: Mollusca
- Class: Gastropoda
- Subclass: Caenogastropoda
- Order: Neogastropoda
- Family: Columbellidae
- Genus: Astyris
- Species: A. amphissella

Binomial name
- Astyris amphissella (Dall, 1881)

Species of gastropod

Astyris amphissella is a species of sea snail, a marine gastropod mollusc in the family Columbellidae, the dove snails.
