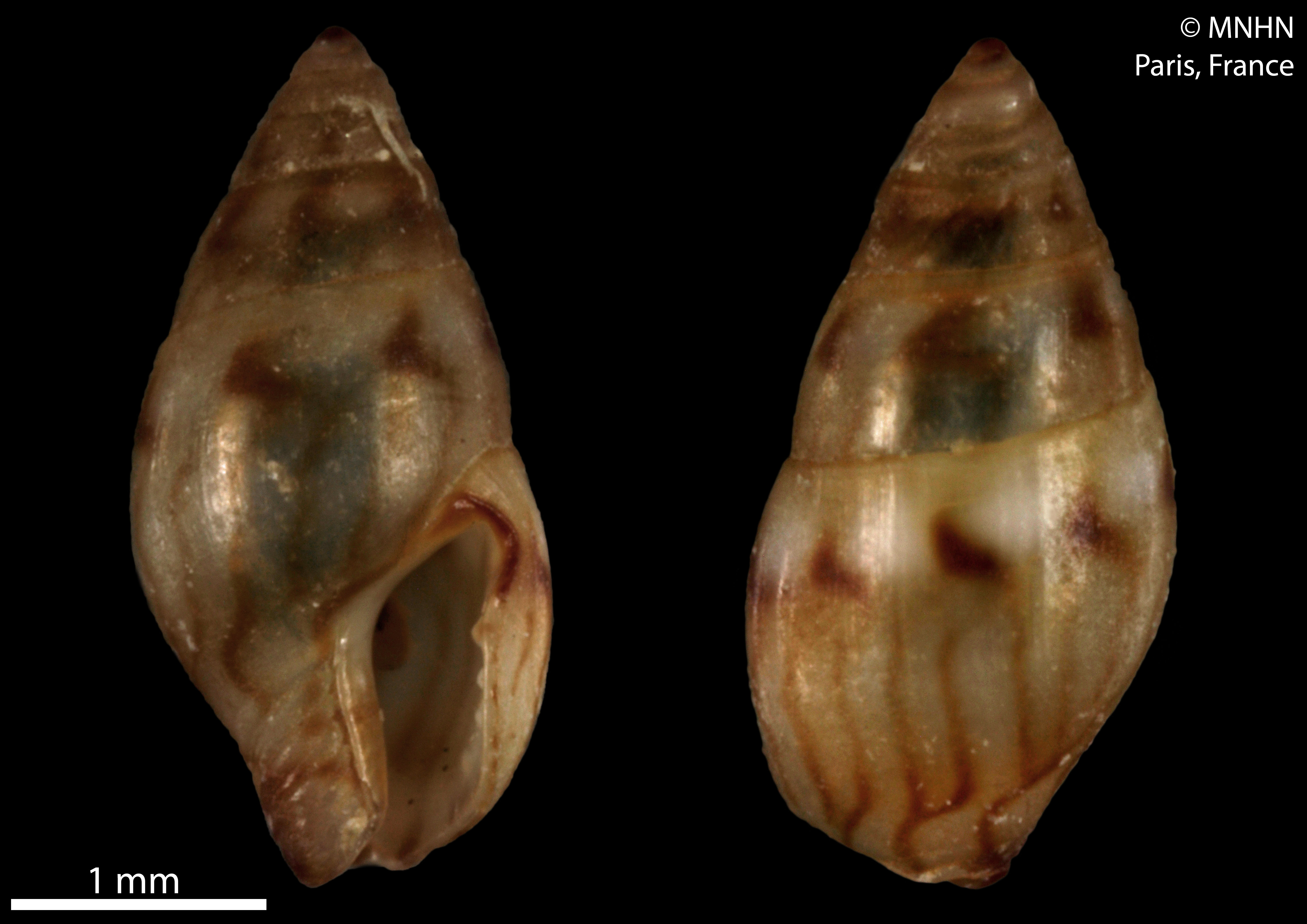
- Shell of Astyris lunata (specimen at MNHN, Paris)

Scientific classification
- Kingdom: Animalia
- Phylum: Mollusca
- Class: Gastropoda
- Subclass: Caenogastropoda
- Order: Neogastropoda
- Family: Columbellidae
- Genus: Astyris
- Species: A. lunata

Binomial name
- Astyris lunata (Say, 1826)

Synonyms
- Antimitrella lunata (Say, 1826); Astyris zonalis Gould, 1848; Buccinum pusillum Pfeiffer, 1840; Buccinum wheatleyi Kay, 1843; Buccinum zonale Gould, 1848; Columbella dissimilis Stimpson, 1851; Columbella duclosiana d'Orbigny, 1845; Columbella gouldiana Stimpson, 1851; Columbella pusilla G. B. Sowerby I, 1844; Mitrella dissimilis (Stimpson, 1851); Mitrella lunata (Say, 1826); Nassa lunata Say, 1826 (original combination)

= Astyris lunata =

Species of gastropod

Astyris lunata is a species of sea snail, a marine gastropod mollusc in the family Columbellidae, the dove snails.

== Distribution ==
This marine species occurs off Canada: Nova Scotia, New Brunswick; USA: Maine; also offFrench Guiana
