= Astyris raveneli =

Scientific classification
- Kingdom: Animalia
- Phylum: Mollusca
- Class: Gastropoda
- Subclass: Caenogastropoda
- Order: Neogastropoda
- Family: Columbellidae
- Genus: Astyris
- Species: A. raveneli

Binomial name
- Astyris raveneli (Dall, 1889)

Synonyms
- Columbella nivea (Ravenel, 1861); Columbella raveneli (Dall, 1889); Mitrella raveneli (Dall, 1889)

Species of gastropod

Astyris raveneli is a species of sea snail, a marine gastropod mollusc in the family Columbellidae, the dove snails.

== Distribution ==
It has been found throughout the Gulf of Mexico and along the East Coast of the United States of America, as well as around the Caribbean.
