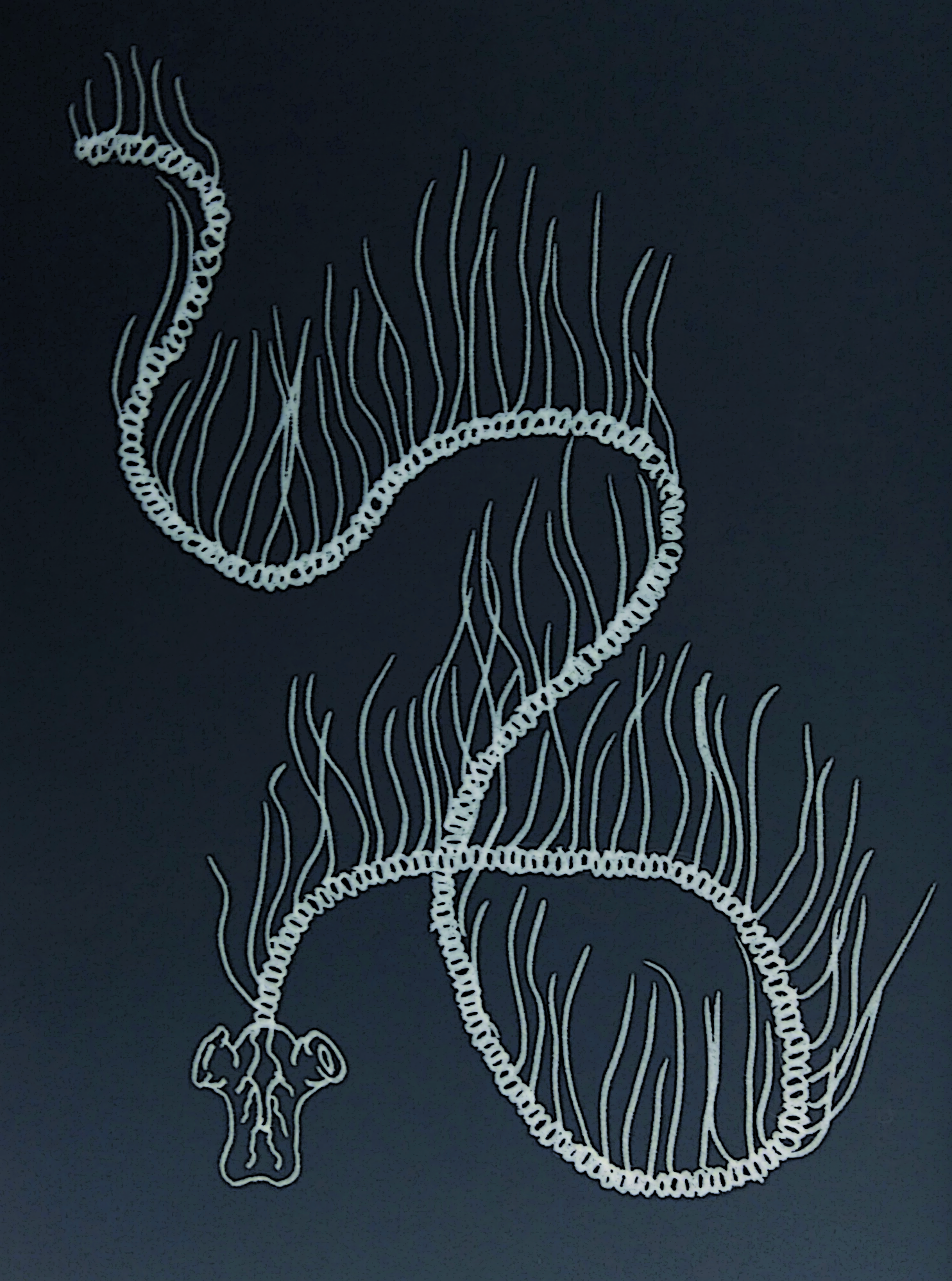
- Illustration of Praya dubia

Scientific classification
- Kingdom: Animalia
- Phylum: Cnidaria
- Class: Hydrozoa
- Order: Siphonophorae
- Family: Prayidae
- Genus: Praya; Quoy & Gaimard in de Blainville, 1834

= Praya (cnidarian) =

Genus of hydrozoans

Praya is a genus of marine invertebrates in the order Siphonophorae. They are colonial, but the colonies can superficially resemble jellyfish; although they appear to be a single organism, each specimen is actually a colony of Siphonophora. It contains the following species:

- Praya dubia (Quoy & Gaimard in de Blainville, 1830)
- Praya reticulata (Bigelow, 1911)
