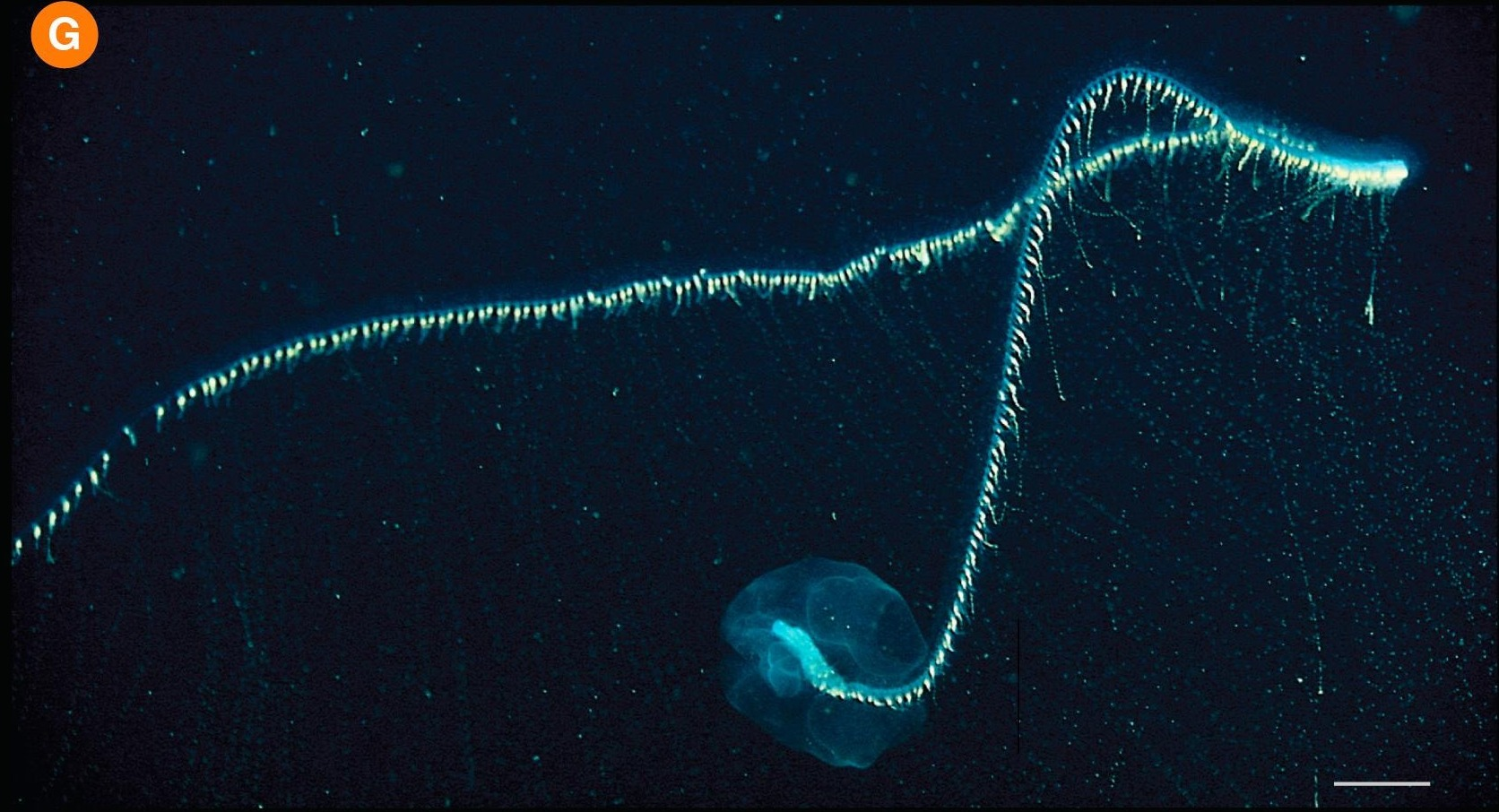
- Photograph of a live giant siphonophore

Scientific classification
- Kingdom: Animalia
- Phylum: Cnidaria
- Class: Hydrozoa
- Order: Siphonophorae
- Family: Prayidae
- Genus: Praya
- Species: P. dubia

Binomial name
- Praya dubia (Quoy & Gaimard, 1827)

Synonyms
- Diphyes dubia Quoy & Gaimard, 1833; Nectocarmen antonioi Alvariño, 1983; Praia dubia Blainville, 1830; Prayoides intermedia Leloup, 1934

= Praya dubia =

Species of hydrozoan

Praya dubia, the giant siphonophore, is a species of siphonophore hydrozoan that lives in the mesopelagic zone to bathypelagic zone at 700 m (2,300 ft) to 1,000 m (3,300 ft) below sea level. It has been found off the coasts around the world, from Iceland in the North Atlantic to Chile in the South Pacific. With a body length of up to 50 m (160 ft), it is the second-longest sea organism after the bootlace worm or the longest sea organism surpassing the bootlace worm if the longest specimens of the bootlace worm were just stretched beyond their usual length or nonexistent/mistaken. Its length also rivals the blue whale, the sea's largest mammal, although Praya dubia is as thin as a broomstick.

Siphonophores are not single, multi-cellular organisms, but compound animals; colonies of tiny biological components called zooids, each having evolved with a specific function. Zooids cannot survive on their own, relying on symbiosis in order for a complete Praya dubia specimen to survive.

== Description ==
Praya dubia zooids arrange themselves in a long stalk—usually whitish and transparent (though other colours have been seen)—known as a physonect colony. Next to it are the nectophores, powerful medusae which pulsate in rhythmic coordination which propel Praya dubia through ocean waters. Together, the array is known as the nectosome.

Beneath the nectosome is the siphosome which extends to the far end of Praya dubia, containing several types of specialized zooids in repeating patterns. Some have a long tentacle used for catching and immobilizing food and distributing their digested nutrients to the rest of the colony. Other zooids known as palpons, or dactylozooids, appear to contain an excretory system that may also assist in defense, though little is known about their precise function in Praya dubia. Transparent bracts (also called hydrophyllia), are leaf-shaped organs generally thought to be another type of zooid which covers and forces other zooids to contract in times of danger. Pneumatophores, which have gas to provide flotability, next are the nectophores, these structures that, by expelling water to propel the colony, are little motors. Gastrozooids, which are the mouth and stomach of the colony, and Dactylozooids, which are like tentacles equipped for defense and hunting with stinging cells.

Due to their hydrostatic skeleton being held together by water pressure above 46 MPa (460 bar), these animals burst when brought to the surface. The remains of Praya dubia dredged up in fishing nets resemble a blob of gelatin, which prevented their identification as a unique creature until the 19th century. In 1987, Monterey Bay Aquarium Research Institute observed living Praya dubia during a systematic study of a water column, the animal's natural habitat, in Monterey Bay.

== Behavior ==
Praya dubia is an active swimmer that attracts its prey with bright blue bioluminescent light. When it finds itself in a region abundant with food, it holds its position and deploys a curtain of tentacles covered with nematocysts which produce a powerful, toxic sting that can paralyze or kill prey that happen to bump into it. Praya dubia's diet includes gelatinous sea life, small crustaceans, and possibly small fish and fish larvae. It has no known predators.

A Praya dubia specimen, filmed in its native habitat, was featured in Episode 2 of the David Attenborough television series Blue Planet II, produced for the BBC.
