= Rosacea (cnidarian) =

Scientific classification
- Kingdom: Animalia
- Phylum: Cnidaria
- Class: Hydrozoa
- Order: Siphonophorae
- Family: Prayidae
- Subfamily: Prayinae
- Genus: Rosacea; Quoy & Gaimard, 1827

Type species
- Rosacea plicata Bigelow, 1911 (by subsequent designation)

Species
- Rosacea arabiana Pugh, 2002; Rosacea cymbiformis (Delle Chiaje, 1830); Rosacea flaccida Biggs, Pugh & Carré, 1978; Rosacea limbata Pugh & Youngbluth, 1988; Rosacea plicata Bigelow, 1911; Rosacea repanda Pugh & Youngbluth, 1988

Synonyms
- Eudoxella Haeckel, 1888; Neorosacea Margulis, 1994

Genus of hydrozoans

The Rosacea genus is a genus of hydrozoan cnidarians in the order Siphonophorae and the family Prayidae. They have been observed in the Atlantic and Pacific Oceans, the Mediterranean Sea, the Sargasso Sea, and the Gulf of Oman, with some species having worldwide distribution excluding polar waters. The Rosacea genus is a pelagic, deep-sea, holoplanktonic genus residing in the water column. The genus contains bioluminescent species.

== Known Species ==
There is still a lot that is unknown about Siphonophores and the Rosacea genus specifically, however with continued research and dives in HOVs, ROVs, and AUVs, scientists are continue to discover more information. Currently, researchers have been able to identify at least six species of Rosacea siphonophores; Rosacea cymbiformis, R. plicata, R. flaccida, R. limbiata, R. repanda, and Rosacea arabiana. Each of the organisms share a similar body plan, with a hydroecial groove and lateral radial canals in the nectosac. A deeper analysis of the physiology of Rosacea will be described in the next section of this page.

The major differences in each species lies in their relative locations and origins of discovery. The genus Rosacea was discovered by Quoy and Gaimard in 1827, and since their original discovery, which provided a description of the unknown organism, other researchers have been able to compare and discover new species within the genus.

=== Origins of Discovery ===
R. cymbiformis was discovered in 1830 by Delle Chiaje and are typically located in warmer waters, such as the North Atlantic, Mediterranean Sea, and parts of the Pacific Ocean along the coast of California.

R. plicata was discovered in 1911 by Henry Bryant Bigelow, which was originally thought to have been discovered by Quoy and Gaimard. After examining the speciment and comparing it to thr description provided by Quoy and Gaimard, it was decided that the organisms were not the same, and R. plicata was a Bigelow discovery.

R. flaccida was discovered in 1978 in the Northern Sargasso Sea. It was found by SCUBa divers in the upper 30 meters of the ocean, and the findings were published by Biggs, Pugh, and Carre. It can typically be found in the North Atlantic Ocean and compared to other Rosacea, their nectophores are softer and more cylindrical and their bracts are flatter. The R. flaccida also differs from other Rosacea because they are typically found at greater depths in the ocean (~200-1,600 meters deep) while R. flaccida was found only 30m deep.

R. limbata was discovered in 1988 by Pugh and Youngbluth in the North Atlantic. It can typically be found in the Northwest Providence Channel, around the Great Abaco Islands, the Bahamas, and the North Atlantic. Similar to R. plicata, it prefers to inhabit warmer waters.

R. repanda was originally discovered by Pugh and Youngbluth in 1988 and collected via a deep-sea submersible in the Bahamas. Although there is still little information regarding R. repanda, it can be located throughout the Western Atlantic Ocean, primarily in the wamer waters around the Bahamas.

R. arabiana was discovered by Pugh in 1997 in the Gulf of Oman in the depth range of about 200 to 150 meters. While R. arabiana does share the similar qualities of a small nectosac and cylindrical nectophores, it differs in that it has radial canals on the nectosac. This differs from other Rosacea as its nectosac is not as coiled or twisted and intricate. This makes it similar in morphology to R. limbiata. R. arabiana are most distriguishable from other Rosacea because of their radial canals that brand from the dorsal canal rather than all canals branching from the pedicular canal.

== Physiology ==
Like all siphonophores, Rosacea are colonial organisms composed of multicellular individuals called zooids that are added to the colonial organism through asexual reproduction. Zooids, while genetically identical, serve distinct functions within the siphonophore. See Siphonophore for descriptions of some notable zooids.

=== Morphology and Distinguishing Features ===
Rosacea nectophores are cylindrical, containing nectosacs that are relatively small. A distinguishing characteristic of Rosacea is their typically S-shaped course of the lateral radial canals on the nectosacs, and ascending or descending branches to the simple somatocyst, an oil-filled cavity found in the nectophore of the species (the swimming bell). Hydroecial canals have been described as both ?-shaped and S-shaped within the genus. Important physiological features, like bracts and nectosacs, vary greatly in size from species to species within the Rosacea genus. Gonophores, or specialized reproductive zooids, are asymmetric in all Rosacea species except R. flaccida. Some species, like Rosacea repanda and R. limbata, have frilled nectophores.

While little work has been done on in-tact species of the Rosacea genus, researchers were able to study the real-time development of nematocysts in R. cymbiformis. Nematocysts are stinging capsules that develop on tentilla and stun and capture prey. In Rosacea, these nematocysts grow and develop within cnidoblasts, which then differentiate into a cnidocyte containing a functional nematocyst.

When characterizing or distinguishing a Rosacea organism, the shape of the nectophore, the presence or absence of a distinct descending or ascending branch to the somatocyst, and the course of the lateral radial canals on the nectosac are primarily used. When distinguishing one Rosacea species from another, the shape of the bracts, as well as the shape and nature of the nectophores, and specifically the course of the hydroecial canals, are used.

=== Diet and Hunting ===
Rosacea diets consists primarily of copepods, crab larvae, juvenile shrimp and mysids, and pelagic molluscs. Specific prey compositions vary greatly by individual, depending on specific organisms available in each siphonophores adjacent environment. Since siphonophores are gelatinous zooplankton, they lack strong swimming ability and thus cannot dart after prey like some other pelagic organisms. Thus, "Feeding selectivity likely depends on the speed and diameter of the prey," and the frequency at which they come in contact with the siphonophores tentacles, or tentilla.

== Challenges with Research ==
The Rosacea genus, like all siphonophores, is gelatinous. This makes them highly difficult to collect, disintegrating when coming into contact with a collecting net. Without intact species to study, learning about siphonophore biology and physiology is extremely difficult. This often limits the number of species that can be collected once siphonophores are found, making in-depth research challenging even when some specimens are able to be collected. This is the primary reason for it being a understudied marine order. Some siphonophores have also been shown to be sensitive to changes in current and light, causing research vehicles like ROVs and HOVs to disrupt their natural behavior and make study more difficult.
