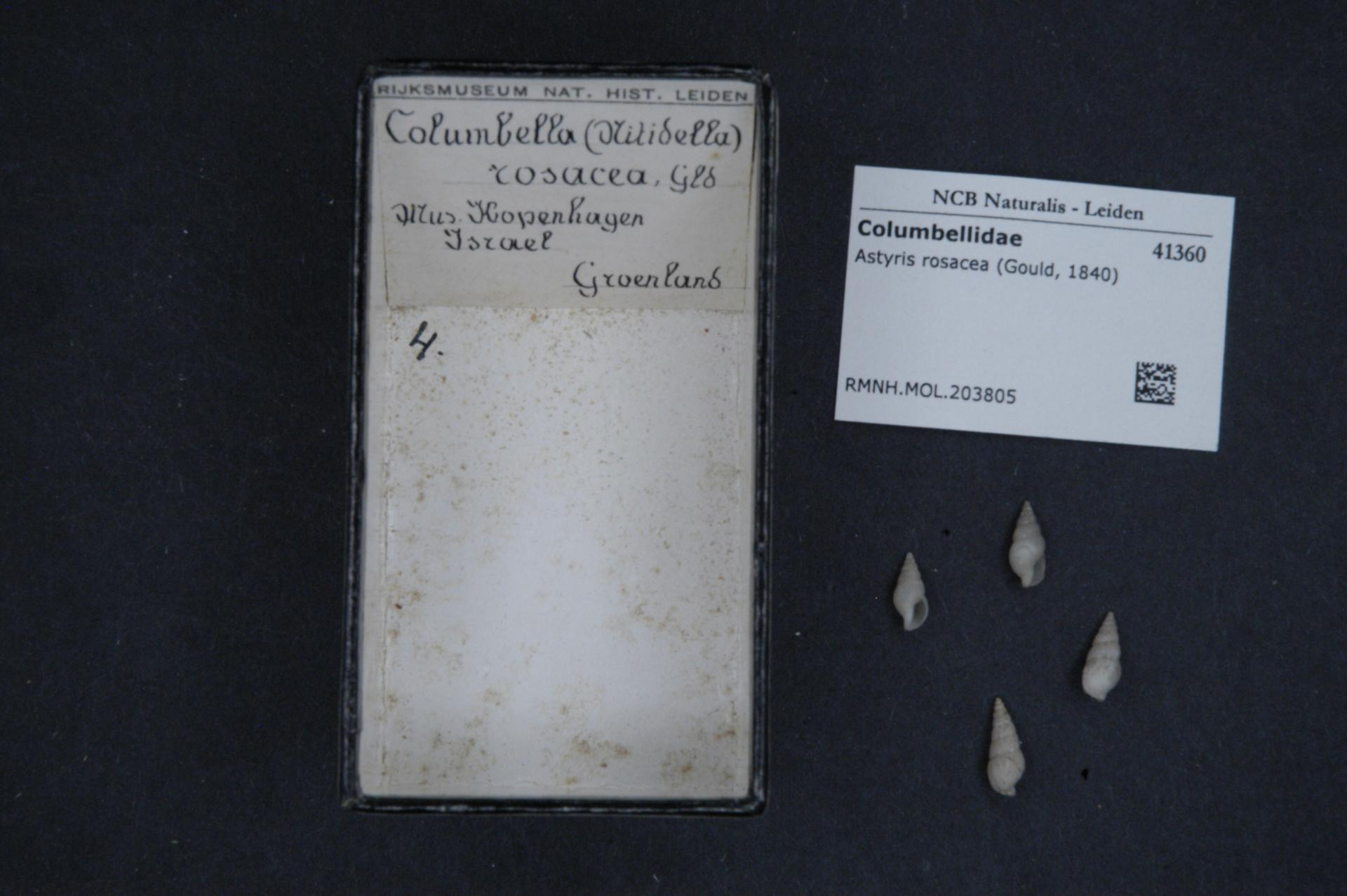
- Astyris rosacea shell

Scientific classification
- Kingdom: Animalia
- Phylum: Mollusca
- Class: Gastropoda
- Subclass: Caenogastropoda
- Order: Neogastropoda
- Family: Columbellidae
- Genus: Astyris
- Species: A. rosacea

Binomial name
- Astyris rosacea (Gould, 1840)

Synonyms
- Buccinum rosaceum Gould, 1840 (original combination); Columbella rosacea (Gould, 1840); Mangelia holböllii Möller, 1842; Mangelia hollboelli Møller, 1842; Mitrella rosacea (Gould, 1840)

= Astyris rosacea =

Species of gastropod

Astyris rosacea, common name the rosy northern dovesnail, is a species of sea snail, a marine gastropod mollusc in the family Columbellidae, the dove snails.

== Distribution ==
This marine species occurs in the North Atlantic Ocean from Greenland to New Jersey, in European waters and in the Beaufort Sea off Alaska.
