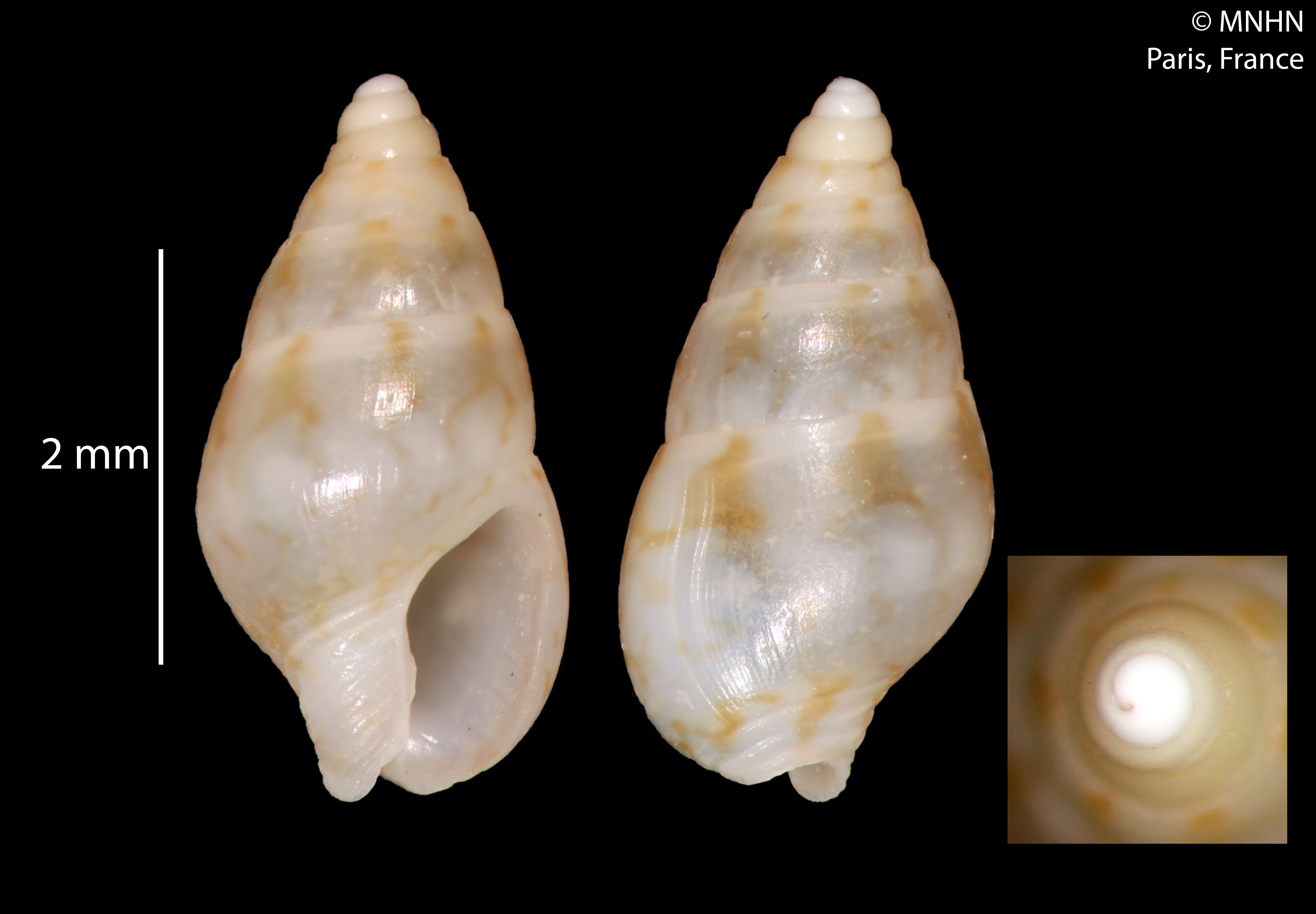
- Shell of Mitrella antares (paratype at MNHN, Paris)

Scientific classification
- Kingdom: Animalia
- Phylum: Mollusca
- Class: Gastropoda
- Subclass: Caenogastropoda
- Order: Neogastropoda
- Family: Columbellidae
- Genus: Mitrella
- Species: M. antares

Binomial name
- Mitrella antares P. M. Costa & P. J. de Souza, 2001

Synonyms
- Astyris antares (Costa & de Souza, 2001)

= Mitrella antares =

Species of gastropod

Mitrella antares is a species of sea snail in the family Columbellidae, the dove snails.

== Distribution ==
This species occurs in the Atlantic Ocean off Brazil.
