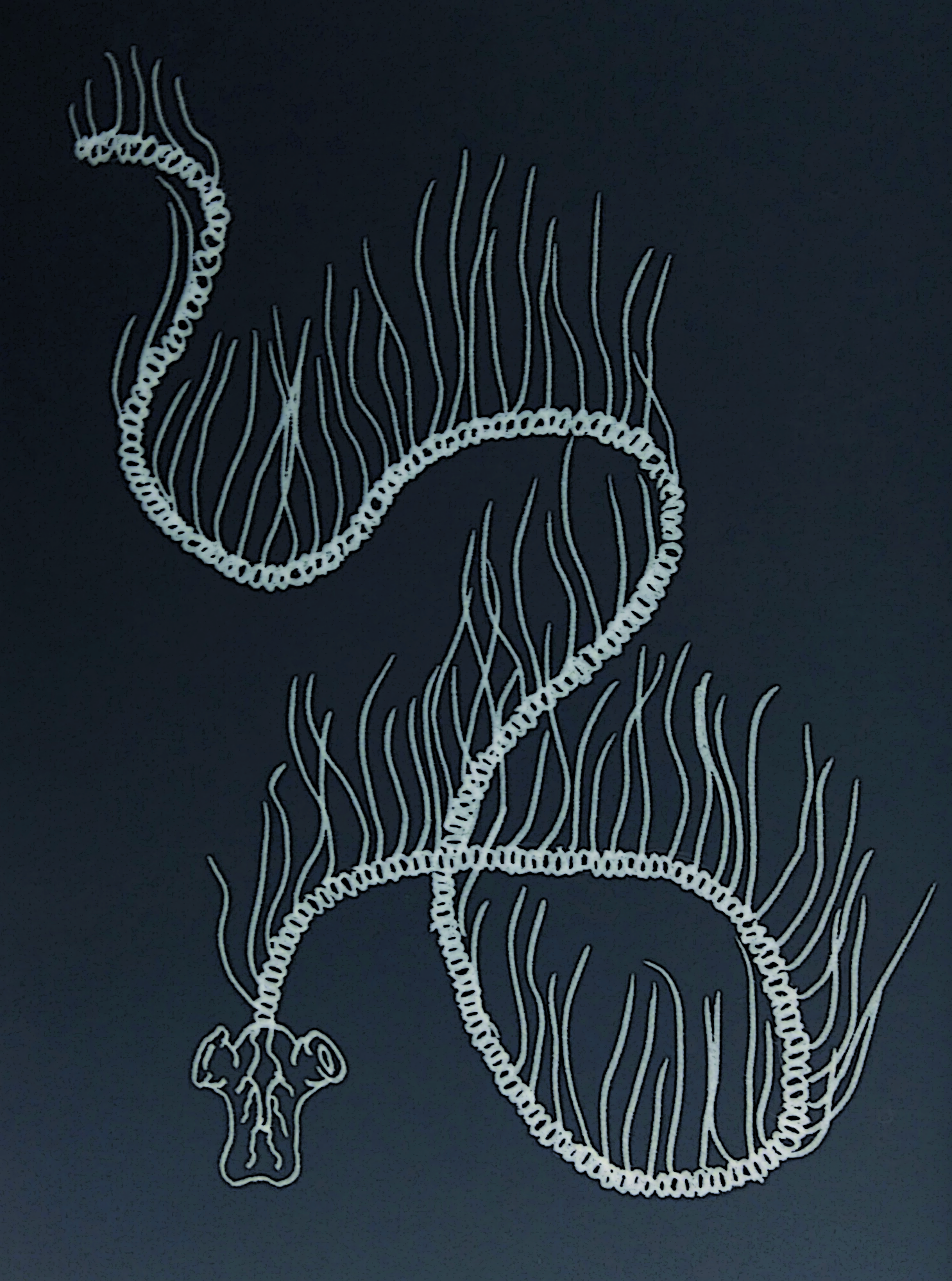
- Illustration of Praya dubia

Scientific classification
- Kingdom: Animalia
- Phylum: Cnidaria
- Class: Hydrozoa
- Order: Siphonophorae
- Suborder: Calycophorae
- Family: Prayidae; Kölliker, 1853

= Prayidae =

Family of hydrozoans

Prayidae is a family of marine invertebrates in the order Siphonophorae. They are colonial, and the colonies can superficially resemble jellyfish; although they appear to be a single organism, each specimen is actually a colony of Siphonophora.

The family contains the following subfamilies and genera:

- Subfamily Amphicaryoninae Chun, 1888
  - Genus Amphicaryon Chun, 1888
  - Genus Maresearsia Totton, 1954
- Subfamily Nectopyramidinae Bigelow, 1911
  - Genus Nectadamas Pugh, 1992
  - Genus Nectopyramis Bigelow, 1911
- Subfamily Prayinae Chun, 1885
  - Genus Craseoa Pugh & Harbison, 1987
  - Genus Desmophyes Haeckel, 1888
  - Genus Gymnopraia Haddock, Dunn & Pugh, 2005
  - Genus Lilyopsis Chun, 1885
  - Genus Mistoprayina Pugh & Harbison, 1987
  - Genus Praya Quoy & Gaimard, in de Blainville, 1834
  - Genus Prayola Carré, C. 1969
  - Genus Rosacea Quoy & Gaimard, 1827
  - Genus Stephanophyes Chun, 1888
