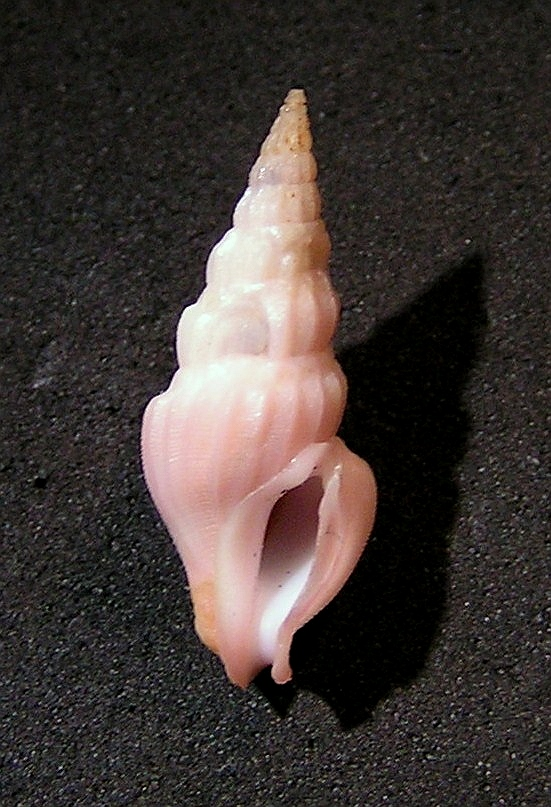
- Apertural view of a shell of Drillia rosacea

Scientific classification
- Kingdom: Animalia
- Phylum: Mollusca
- Class: Gastropoda
- Subclass: Caenogastropoda
- Order: Neogastropoda
- Superfamily: Conoidea
- Family: Drilliidae
- Genus: Drillia
- Species: D. rosacea

Binomial name
- Drillia rosacea (Reeve, 1845)

Synonyms
- Crassispira rosacea von Maltzan, 1883; Drillia (Brachystoma) rosacea Tryon, 1884; Drillia (Crassispira) rosacea H. & A. Adams, 1853; Neodrillia rosacea (Reeve, L.A., 1845); Pleurotoma rosacea Reeve, 1845 (basionym)

= Drillia rosacea =

Species of gastropod

Drillia rosacea, common name the rose turrid, is a species of sea snail, a marine gastropod mollusk in the family Drilliidae.

== Description ==
The shell grows to a length of 30 mm.

The shell is rose-colored throughout. It is longitudinally closely ribbed, with fine revolving striae, concave and smooth above the periphery. The siphonal canal is very short. The anal sinus is broad and large.

== Distribution ==
This species occurs in the demersal zone of the Atlantic Ocean off Guinea, Ivory Coast and Gabon
