= List of Wildlife Species at Risk (Canada) =

As of November 2024, the List of Wildlife Species at Risk has more than 600 entries for Canadian wildlife species considered at varying risks of extinction, including 301 classified as endangered species, 147 threatened species, 200 special concern, and 23 extirpated (no longer existing in the wild in Canada, but exists elsewhere). About 65 percent of Canada's resident species are considered "Secure". More than 30 wildlife species have become extinct in the wild since the arrival of European settlers.

The Government of Canada maintains a list of all plant and animal species, or designatable units (DUs) thereof, federally recognized as special concern, threatened, endangered, extirpated, and extinct in Canada under Schedule I of the Species at Risk Act (SARA).

== SARA Schedule ==
Species listed on SARA Schedule I receive federal legal protections under the act, including the protection of individuals, populations, and their habitat from harm. Listing on Schedule I of the act also mandates the formation of a species recovery team and strategy. The addition of species or DUs to Schedule I is done annually by the Minister of the Environment, based on formal assessment recommendations by the Committee on the Status of Endangered Wildlife in Canada (COSEWIC), an independent committee of wildlife experts and scientists. COSEWIC assessments and IUCN designations by themselves are not to be confused with actual Schedule I listings as both of the former have no formal legal status in Canada.

== Mammals ==
=== Extirpated mammals ===
- Eschrichtius robustus — grey whale (Atlantic population)
- Mustela nigripes — black-footed ferret
- Odobenus rosmarus rosmarus — Atlantic walrus (northwest Atlantic population)

=== Endangered mammals ===
- Balaenoptera borealis — sei whale (Pacific population)
- Balaenoptera musculus — blue whale
- Eubalaena glacialis — North Atlantic right whale
- Gulo gulo — wolverine (eastern population)
- Hyperoodon ampullatus — northern bottlenose whale (Scotian Shelf population)
- Marmota vancouverensis — Vancouver Island marmot
- Martes americana atrata — American marten (Newfoundland population)
- Orcinus orca — orca or killer whale (Pacific southern resident population)
- Rangifer tarandus caribou — woodland caribou (Atlantic/Gaspésie population)
- Scapanus townsendii — Townsend's mole
- Sorex bendirii — Pacific water shrew
- Taxidea taxus jacksoni — American badger; jacksoni subspecies
- Taxidea taxus jeffersonii — American badger; jeffersonii subspecies
- Vulpes velox — swift fox

=== Threatened mammals ===
- Antrozous pallidus — pallid bat
- Balaenoptera physalus (Pacific population) — fin whale
- Bison bison athabascae — wood bison
- Enhydra lutris — sea otter
- Delphinapterus leucas (St. Lawrence Estuary population) — beluga whale
- Mustela haidarum — Haida ermine
- Megaptera novaeangliae (North Pacific population) — humpback whale
- Orcinus orca (northeast Pacific transient population) — killer whale
- Orcinus orca (northeast Pacific northern resident population) — killer whale
- Rangifer tarandus caribou (boreal population) — woodland caribou
- Rangifer tarandus caribou (southern mountain population) — woodland caribou
- Urocyon cinereoargenteus — grey fox

=== Mammals of special concern ===
- Balaena mysticetus (Bering–Chukchi–Beaufort population) — bowhead whale
- Balaenoptera physalus (Atlantic population) — fin whale
- Canis lycaon — eastern wolf
- Enhydra lutris — sea otter
- Cynomys ludovicianus — black-tailed prairie dog
- Eschrichtius robustus (eastern North Pacific population) — grey whale
- Euderma maculatum — spotted bat
- Eumetopias jubatus — Steller sea lion
- Microtus pinetorum — woodland vole
- Orcinus orca (Northeast Pacific offshore population) — killer whale
- Phocoena phocoena (Pacific Ocean population) — harbour porpoise
- Rangifer tarandus caribou (northern mountain population) — woodland caribou
- Scalopus aquaticus — eastern mole
- Sylvilagus nuttallii nuttallii — Nuttall's cottontail, nuttallii subspecies
- Ursus maritimus — polar bear

== Birds ==
=== Extirpated birds ===
- Tympanuchus cupido — greater prairie-chicken

=== Endangered birds ===
- Ammodramus henslowii — Henslow's sparrow
- Athene cunicularia — burrowing owl
- Centrocercus urophasianus urophasianus — greater sage-grouse, urophasianus subspecies
- Charadrius melodus circumcinctus — piping plover, circumcinctus subspecies
- Charadrius melodus melodus — piping plover, melodus subspecies
- Charadrius montanus — mountain plover
- Colinus virginianus — northern bobwhite
- Dendroica kirtlandii — Kirtland's warbler
- Empidonax virescens — Acadian flycatcher
- Eremophila alpestris strigata — horned lark, strigata subspecies
- Grus americana — whooping crane
- Icteria virens auricollis (British Columbia population) — yellow-breasted chat, auricollis subspecies
- Lanius ludovicianus migrans — loggerhead shrike, migrans subspecies
- Loxia curvirostra percna — red crossbill, percna subspecies
- Megascops kennicottii macfarlanei — western screech-owl, macfarlanei subspecies
- Numenius borealis — Eskimo curlew
- Oreoscoptes montanus — sage thrasher
- Picoides albolarvatus — white-headed woodpecker
- Pooecetes gramineus affinis — vesper sparrow, affinis subspecies
- Protonotaria citrea — prothonotary warbler
- Rallus elegans — king rail
- Sphyrapicus thyroideus — Williamson's sapsucker
- Sterna dougallii — roseate tern
- Strix occidentalis caurina — spotted owl, caurina subspecies
- Tyto furcata (eastern population) — American barn owl

=== Threatened birds ===
- Accipiter gentilis laingi — northern goshawk, laingi subspecies
- Aegolius acadicus brooksi — northern saw-whet owl, brooksi subspecies
- Anthus spragueii — Sprague's pipit
- Brachyramphus marmoratus — marbled murrelet
- Falco peregrinus anatum — peregrine falcon, anatum subspecies
- Ixobrychus exilis — least bittern
- Lanius ludovicianus excubitorides — loggerhead shrike, excubitorides subspecies
- Phoebastria albatrus — short-tailed albatross
- Puffinus creatopus — pink-footed shearwater
- Riparia riparia - bank swallow
- Rhodostethia rosea — Ross' gull
- Vermivora chrysoptera — golden-winged warbler
- Wilsonia citrina — hooded warbler

=== Birds of special concern ===
- Bucephala islandica (eastern population) — Barrow's goldeneye
- Coturnicops noveboracensis — yellow rail
- Dendroica cerulea — cerulean warbler
- Falco peregrinus pealei — peregrine falcon, pealei subspecies
- Histrionicus histrionicus (eastern population) — harlequin duck
- Icteria virens virens — yellow-breasted chat, virens subspecies
- Megascops kennicottii kennicottii — western screech-owl, kennicottii subspecies
- Melanerpes lewis — Lewis' woodpecker
- Numenius americanus — long-billed curlew
- Otus flammeolus — flammulated owl
- Pagophila eburnea — ivory gull
- Passerculus sandwichensis princeps — Savannah sparrow, princeps subspecies
- Rhynchophanes mccownii — thick-billed longspur
- Seiurus motacilla — Louisiana waterthrush
- Synthliboramphus antiquus — ancient murrelet
- Tyto furcata (western population) — American barn owl

== Reptiles ==
=== Extirpated reptiles ===
- Actinemys marmorata — Pacific pond turtle
- Crotalus horridus — timber rattlesnake
- Phrynosoma douglasii — pygmy short-horned lizard
- Pituophis catenifer catenifer — Pacific gophersnake

=== Endangered reptiles ===
- Chrysemys picta bellii (Pacific Coast population) — western painted turtle
- Clemmys guttata — spotted turtle
- Coluber constrictor foxii — blue racer
- Contia tenuis — sharp-tailed snake
- Dermochelys coriacea — leatherback seaturtle
- Emydoidea blandingii (Nova Scotia population) — Blanding's turtle
- Eumeces septentrionalis — prairie skink
- Hypsiglena torquata — nightsnake

=== Threatened reptiles ===
- Apalone spinifera — spiny softshell
- Coluber constrictor flaviventris — eastern yellow-bellied racer
- Crotalus oreganus — western rattlesnake
- Elaphe gloydi — eastern foxsnake
- Elaphe spiloides — grey ratsnake
- Emydoidea blandingii (Great Lakes / St. Lawrence population) — Blanding's turtle
- Heterodon platirhinos — eastern hog-nosed snake
- Pituophis catenifer deserticola — Great Basin gophersnake
- Regina septemvittata — queen snake
- Sistrurus catenatus — massasauga
- Sternotherus odoratus — stinkpot
- Thamnophis butleri — Butler's gartersnake
- Thamnophis saurita (Atlantic population) — eastern ribbonsnake

=== Reptiles of special concern ===
- Charina bottae — rubber boa
- Chrysemys picta bellii (intermountain–Rocky Mountain population) — western painted turtle
- Coluber constrictor mormon — western yellow-bellied racer
- Eumeces skiltonianus — western skink
- Graptemys geographica — northern map turtle
- Lampropeltis triangulum — milksnake
- Thamnophis saurita (Great Lakes population) — eastern ribbonsnake

== Amphibians ==
=== Extirpated amphibians ===
- Ambystoma tigrinum (Great Lakes population) — tiger salamander

=== Endangered amphibians ===
- Acris crepitans — northern cricket frog
- Ambystoma texanum — small-mouthed salamander
- Ambystoma tigrinum (southern mountain population) — tiger salamander
- Ascaphus montanus — Rocky Mountain tailed frog
- Rana pipiens (southern mountain population) — northern leopard frog
- Rana pretiosa — Oregon spotted frog

=== Threatened amphibians ===
- Ambystoma jeffersonianum — Jefferson salamander
- Bufo fowleri — Fowler's toad
- Desmognathus ochrophaeus — Allegheny Mountain dusky salamander
- Dicamptodon tenebrosus — coastal giant salamander
- Spea intermontana — Great Basin spadefoot

=== Amphibians of special concern ===
- Ascaphus truei — coast tailed frog
- Bufo boreas — western toad
- Bufo cognatus — Great Plains toad
- Gyrinophilus porphyriticus — spring salamander
- Plethodon idahoensis — Coeur d'Alene salamander
- Rana aurora — red-legged frog
- Rana pipiens (western boreal/prairie populations) — northern leopard frog

== Fish ==
=== Extirpated fish ===
- Erimystax x-punctatus — gravel chub
- Polyodon spathula — paddlefish

=== Endangered fish ===
- Acipenser transmontanus — white sturgeon
- Catostomus catostomus subsp. — Salish sucker
- Coregonus huntsmani — Atlantic whitefish
- Coregonus reighardi — shortnose cisco
- Gasterosteus sp. — benthic Enos Lake stickleback
- Gasterosteus sp. — benthic Paxton Lake stickleback
- Gasterosteus sp. — benthic Vananda Creek stickleback
- Gasterosteus sp. — limnetic Enos Lake stickleback
- Gasterosteus sp. — limnetic Paxton Lake stickleback
- Gasterosteus sp. — limnetic Vananda Creek stickleback
- Lampetra richardsoni var. marifuga — Morrison Creek lamprey
- Moxostoma hubbsi — copper redhorse
- Notropis anogenus — pugnose shiner
- Noturus stigmosus — northern madtom
- Rhinichthys cataractae subsp. — Nooksack dace
- Salmo salar (Inner Bay of Fundy populations) — Atlantic salmon
- Salvelinus fontinalis timagamiensis — aurora trout

=== Threatened fish ===
- Ammocrypta pellucida — eastern sand darter
- Anarhichas denticulatus — northern wolffish
- Anarhichas minor — spotted wolffish
- Cottus confusus — shorthead sculpin
- Cottus paulus — pygmy sculpin
- Cottus sp. (St. Mary and Milk River populations) — eastslope sculpin
- Erimyzon sucetta — lake chubsucker
- Hybognathus argyritis — western silvery minnow
- Lampetra macrostoma — Vancouver lamprey
- Lepisosteus oculatus — spotted gar
- Notropis percobromus — carmine shiner
- Osmerus spectrum — Lake Utopia dwarf smelt
- Percina copelandi — channel darterm

=== Fish of special concern ===
- Acipenser medirostris — green sturgeon
- Anarhichas lupus — Atlantic wolffish
- Coregonus kiyi kiyi — Upper Great Lakes kiyi
- Cottus hubbsi — Columbia sculpin
- Esox americanus vermiculatus — grass pickerel
- Fundulus diaphanus (Newfoundland population) — banded killifish
- Fundulus notatus — blackstripe topminnow
- Lepomis gulosus — warmouth
- Macrhybopsis storeriana — silver chub
- Minytrema melanops — spotted sucker
- Moxostoma carinatum — river redhorse
- Myoxocephalus thompsonii (Great Lakes–Western St. Lawrence populations) — deepwater sculpin
- Notropis bifrenatus — bridle shiner
- Opsopoeodus emiliae — pugnose minnow

== Arthropods ==
=== Extirpated arthropods ===
- Callophrys (Incisalia) irus — frosted elfin
- Euchloe ausonides — island marble
- Plebejus melissa samuelis — Karner blue

=== Endangered arthropods ===
- Apodemia mormo (southern mountain population) — Mormon metalmark
- Bombus affinis - rusty-patched bumble bee
- Bombus bohemicus - gypsy cuckoo bumble bee
- Brychius hungerfordi - Hungerford's crawling water beetle
- Cicindela patruela - Northern Barrens tiger beetle
- Coenonympha nipisiquit — maritime ringlet
- Copablepharon fuscum — sand-verbena moth
- Erynnis persius persius — eastern Persius duskywing
- Erynnis martialis - mottled duskywing
- Euphydryas editha taylori — Taylor's checkerspot
- Gomphus ventricosus - skillet clubtail
- Hemileuca sp. - bogbean buckmoth
- Hesperia ottoe — Ottoe skipper
- Papaipema aweme — Aweme borer
- Icaricia saepiolus insulanus — island blue
- Prodoxus quinquepunctellus — five-spotted bogus yucca moth
- Satyrium semiluna — half-moon hairstreak
- Schinia avemensis — gold-edged gem
- Schinia bimatris — white flower moth
- Somatochlora hineana - Hine's emerald
- Stylurus amnicola - riverine clubtail
- Stylurus laurae - Laura's clubtail
- Stylurus olivaceus - olive clubtail
- Tegeticula corruptrix — non-pollinating yucca moth
- Tegeticula yuccasella — yucca moth

=== Threatened arthropods ===
- Apodemia mormo (prairie population) — Mormon metalmark
- Euphyes vestris (western population) — dun skipper
- Hesperia dacotae — Dakota skipper
- Oarisma poweshiek — Poweshiek skipperling
- Satyrium behrii columbia — Behr's hairstreak, columbia subspecies

=== Arthropods of special concern ===
- Danaus plexippus — monarch
- Limenitis weidemeyerii — Weidemeyer's admiral
- Polites sonora — Sonora skipper

== Molluscs ==
=== Extirpated molluscs ===
- Alasmidonta heterodon — dwarf wedgemussel
- Cryptomastix devia — Puget Oregonian snail

=== Endangered molluscs ===
- Allogona townsendiana — Oregon forestsnail
- Epioblasma torulosa rangiana — northern riffleshell
- Epioblasma triquetra — snuffbox
- Haliotis kamtschatkana — northern abalone
- Lampsilis fasciola — wavy-rayed lampmussel
- Obovaria subrotunda — round hickorynut
- Physella johnsoni — Banff Springs snail
- Physella wrighti — hotwater physa
- Pleurobema sintoxia — round pigtoe
- Prophysaon coelureum — blue-grey taildropper slug
- Ptychobranchus fasciolaris — kidneyshell
- Simpsonaias ambigua — mudpuppy mussel
- Villosa fabalis — rayed bean

=== Threatened molluscs ===
- Hemphillia dromedarius — dromedary jumping-slug

=== Molluscs of special concern ===
- Gonidea angulata — Rocky Mountain ridged mussel
- Lampsilis cariosa — yellow lampmussel
- Nearctula sp. — threaded vertigo
- Ostrea conchaphila — Olympia oyster

== Vascular plants ==
=== Extirpated vascular plants ===
- Collinsia verna — spring blue-eyed mary
- Desmodium illinoense — Illinois tick-trefoil

=== Endangered vascular plants ===
- Abronia umbellata — pink sand-verbena
- Actaea elata — tall bugbane
- Adiantum capillus-veneris — southern maidenhair fern
- Agalinis aspera — rough agalinis
- Agalinis gattingeri — Gattinger's agalinis
- Agalinis skinneriana — Skinner's agalinis
- Ammannia robusta — scarlet ammannia
- Antennaria flagellaris — stoloniferous pussytoes
- Aristida basiramea — forked three-awned grass
- balsamorhiza deltoidea — deltoid balsamroot
- Betula lenta — cherry birch
- Braya longii — Long's braya
- Buchnera americana — bluehearts
- Camissonia contorta — contorted-pod evening-primrose
- Carex lupuliformis — false hop sedge
- Carex juniperorum — juniper sedge
- Castanea dentata — American chestnut
- Castilleja levisecta — golden paintbrush
- Chimaphila maculata — spotted wintergreen
- Cirsium pitcheri — Pitcher's thistle
- Collomia tenella — slender collomia
- Coreopsis rosea — pink coreopsis
- Cryptantha minima — tiny cryptanthe
- Cypripedium candidum — small white lady's-slipper
- Drosera filiformis — thread-leaved sundew
- Eleocharis equisetoides — horsetail spike-rush
- Epilobium densiflorum — dense spike-primrose
- Epilobium torreyi — brook spike-primrose
- Frasera caroliniensis — American columbo
- Gentiana alba — white prairie gentian
- Geum peckii — eastern mountain avens
- Isoetes engelmannii — Engelmann's quillwort
- Isotria medeoloides — small whorled pogonia
- Isotria verticillata — large whorled pogonia
- Juglans cinerea — butternut
- Juncus kelloggii — Kellogg's rush
- Lespedeza virginica — slender bush-clover
- Liparis liliifolia — purple twayblade
- Lipocarpha micrantha — small-flowered lipocarpha
- Lotus formosissimus — seaside bird's-foot lotus
- Lotus pinnatus — bog bird's-foot trefoil
- Lupinus densiflorus — dense-flowered lupine
- Lupinus lepidus var. lepidus — prairie lupine
- Lupinus rivularis — streambank lupine
- Magnolia acuminata — cucumber tree
- Meconella oregana — white meconella
- Microseris bigelovii — coast microseris
- Minuartia pusilla — dwarf sandwort
- Morus rubra — red mulberry
- Opuntia humifusa — eastern prickly pear cactus
- Orthocarpus barbatus — Grand Coulee owl-clover
- Orthocarpus bracteosus — rosy owl-clover
- Panax quinquefolius — American ginseng
- Pedicularis furbishiae — Furbish's lousewort
- Phacelia ramosissima — branched phacelia
- Physematium obtusum — blunt-lobed woodsia
- Plantago cordata — heart-leaved plantain
- Platanthera leucophaea — eastern prairie fringed-orchid
- Platanthera praeclara — western prairie fringed-orchid
- Polygala incarnata — pink milkwort
- Psilocarphus brevissimus (southern mountain population) — dwarf woolly-heads
- Psilocarphus elatior — tall woolly-heads
- Pycnanthemum incanum — hoary mountain-mint
- Ranunculus alismifolius var. alismifolius — water-plantain buttercup
- Rotala ramosior — toothcup
- Salix jejuna — barrens willow
- Sanicula arctopoides — bear's-foot sanicle
- Silene scouleri grandis — coastal Scouler's catchfly
- Silene spaldingii — Spalding's campion
- Solidago speciosa — showy goldenrod
- Stylophorum diphyllum — wood-poppy
- Symphyotrichum frondosum — short-rayed alkali aster
- Tephrosia virginiana — Virginia goat's-rue
- Tonella tenella — small-flowered tonella
- Trichophorum planifolium — bashful bulrush
- Trillium flexipes — drooping trillium
- Triphora trianthophora — nodding pogonia
- Triphysaria versicolor versicolor — bearded owl-clover
- Tripterocalyx micranthus — small-flowered sand-verbena
- Triteleia howellii — Howell's triteleia
- Viola pedata — bird's-foot violet

=== Threatened vascular plants ===
- Aletris farinosa — colicroot
- Azolla mexicana — Mexican mosquito-fern
- Bartonia paniculata paniculata — branched bartonia
- Braya fernaldii — Fernald's braya
- Buchloe dactyloides — buffalograss
- Calochortus lyallii — Lyall's mariposa lily
- Camassia scilloides — wild hyacinth
- Carex sabulosa — Baikal sedge
- Castilleja rupicola — cliff paintbrush
- Celtis tenuifolia — dwarf hackberry
- Cephalanthera austiniae — phantom orchid
- Chenopodium subglabrum — smooth goosefoot
- Cirsium hillii — Hill's thistle
- Corydalis scouleri — Scouler's corydalis
- Dalea villosa var. villosa — hairy prairie-clover
- Eleocharis tuberculosa — tubercled spike-rush
- Enemion biternatum — false rue-anemone
- Eurybia divaricata — white wood aster
- Gentianopsis virgata subsp. victorinii — Victorin's gentian
- Gymnocladus dioicus — Kentucky coffee-tree
- Halimolobos virgata — slender mouse-ear-cress
- Hydrastis canadensis — goldenseal
- Hydrocotyle umbellata — water-pennywort
- Hymenoxys herbacea — lakeside daisy
- Iris lacustris — dwarf lake iris
- Iris missouriensis — western blue flag
- Isoetes bolanderi — Bolander's quillwort
- Justicia americana — American water-willow
- Lachnanthes caroliana — redroot
- Liatris spicata — dense blazing star
- Limnanthes macounii — Macoun's meadowfoam
- Lophiola aurea — golden crest
- Phlox speciosa subsp. occidentalis — showy phlox
- Polemonium vanbruntiae — van Brunt's Jacob's-ladder
- Polystichum lemmonii — Lemmon's holly fern
- Polystichum scopulinum — mountain holly fern
- Ptelea trifoliata — common hoptree
- Sabatia kennedyana — Plymouth gentian
- Salix chlorolepis — green-scaled willow
- Sanicula bipinnatifida — purple sanicle
- Sericocarpus rigidus — white-top aster
- Smilax rotundifolia (Great Lakes plains population) — round-leaved greenbrier
- Symphyotrichum anticostense — Anticosti aster
- Symphyotrichum laurentianum — Gulf of St. Lawrence aster
- Symphyotrichum praealtum — willowleaf aster
- Symphyotrichum prenanthoides — crooked-stem aster
- Symphyotrichum sericeum — western silvery aster
- Tradescantia occidentalis — western spiderwort
- Vaccinium stamineum — deerberry
- Viola praemorsa subsp. praemorsa — yellow montane violet, praemorsa subspecies
- Yucca glauca — soapweed

=== Vascular plants of special concern ===
- Achillea millefolium var. megacephalum — large-headed woolly yarrow
- Armeria maritima subsp. interior — Athabasca thrift
- Arnoglossum plantagineum — tuberous Indian-plantain
- Asplenium scolopendrium var. americanum — American hart's-tongue fern
- Astragalus robbinsii var. fernaldii — Fernald's milk-vetch
- Bidens amplissima — Vancouver Island beggarticks
- Cicuta maculata var. victorinii — Victorin's water-hemlock
- Clethra alnifolia — sweet pepperbush
- Deschampsia mackenzieana — Mackenzie hairgrass
- Dryopteris arguta — coastal wood fern
- Fraxinus quadrangulata — blue ash
- Hibiscus moscheutos — swamp rose-mallow
- Isoetes prototypus — prototype quillwort
- Juncus caesariensis — New Jersey rush
- Lilaeopsis chinensis — eastern lilaeopsis
- Potamogeton hillii — Hill's pondweed
- Psilocarphus brevissimus (prairie population) — dwarf woolly-heads
- Psilocarphus elatior (prairie population) — tall woolly-heads
- Rosa setigera — climbing prairie rose
- Salix brachycarpa var. psammophila — sand dune short-capsuled willow
- Salix silicicola — felt-leaf willow
- Salix turnorii — Turnor's willow
- Solidago houghtonii — Houghton's goldenrod
- Solidago riddellii — Riddell's goldenrod
- Tanacetum huronense var. floccosum — floccose tansy

== Mosses ==
=== Extirpated mosses ===
- Ptychomitrium incurvum — incurved grizzled moss

=== Endangered mosses ===
- Bartramia stricta — rigid apple moss
- Bryoandersonia illecebra — spoon-leaved moss
- Entosthodon rubiginosus — rusty cord-moss
- Fabronia pusilla — silver hair moss
- Fissidens pauperculus — poor pocket moss
- Scouleria marginata — margined streamside moss

=== Threatened mosses ===
- Bartramia halleriana — Haller's apple moss
- Pterygoneurum kozlovii — alkaline wing-nerved moss

=== Mosses of special concern ===
- Bryoerythrophyllum columbianum — Columbian carpet moss
- Entosthodon fascicularis — banded cord-moss
- Fissidens exilis — pygmy pocket moss
- Syntrichia laevipila — twisted oak moss

== Lichens ==
=== Endangered lichens ===
- Erioderma pedicellatum (Atlantic population) — boreal felt lichen
- Heterodermia sitchensis — seaside centipede lichen

=== Threatened lichens ===
- Pannaria lurida — wrinkled shingle lichen
- Leptogium rivulare — flooded jellyskin

=== Lichens of special concern ===
- Erioderma pedicellatum (boreal population) — boreal felt lichen
- Nephroma occultum — cryptic paw
- Sclerophora peronella (Nova Scotia population) — frosted glass-whiskers
