= Ethmia timberlakei =

Scientific classification
- Kingdom: Animalia
- Phylum: Arthropoda
- Clade: Pancrustacea
- Class: Insecta
- Order: Lepidoptera
- Family: Depressariidae
- Genus: Ethmia
- Species: E. timberlakei

Binomial name
- Ethmia timberlakei Powell, 1973

Species of moth

Ethmia timberlakei is a moth in the family Depressariidae. It is found in California, United States.

The length of the forewings is 8.7–10.6 mm (0.34–0.42 in). The ground color of the forewings is dark gray, sparsely to densely irrorated (speckled) with scattered white scales. The ground color of the hindwings is uniform pale gray.

The larvae feed on Phacelia ramosissima var. suffrutescens.
