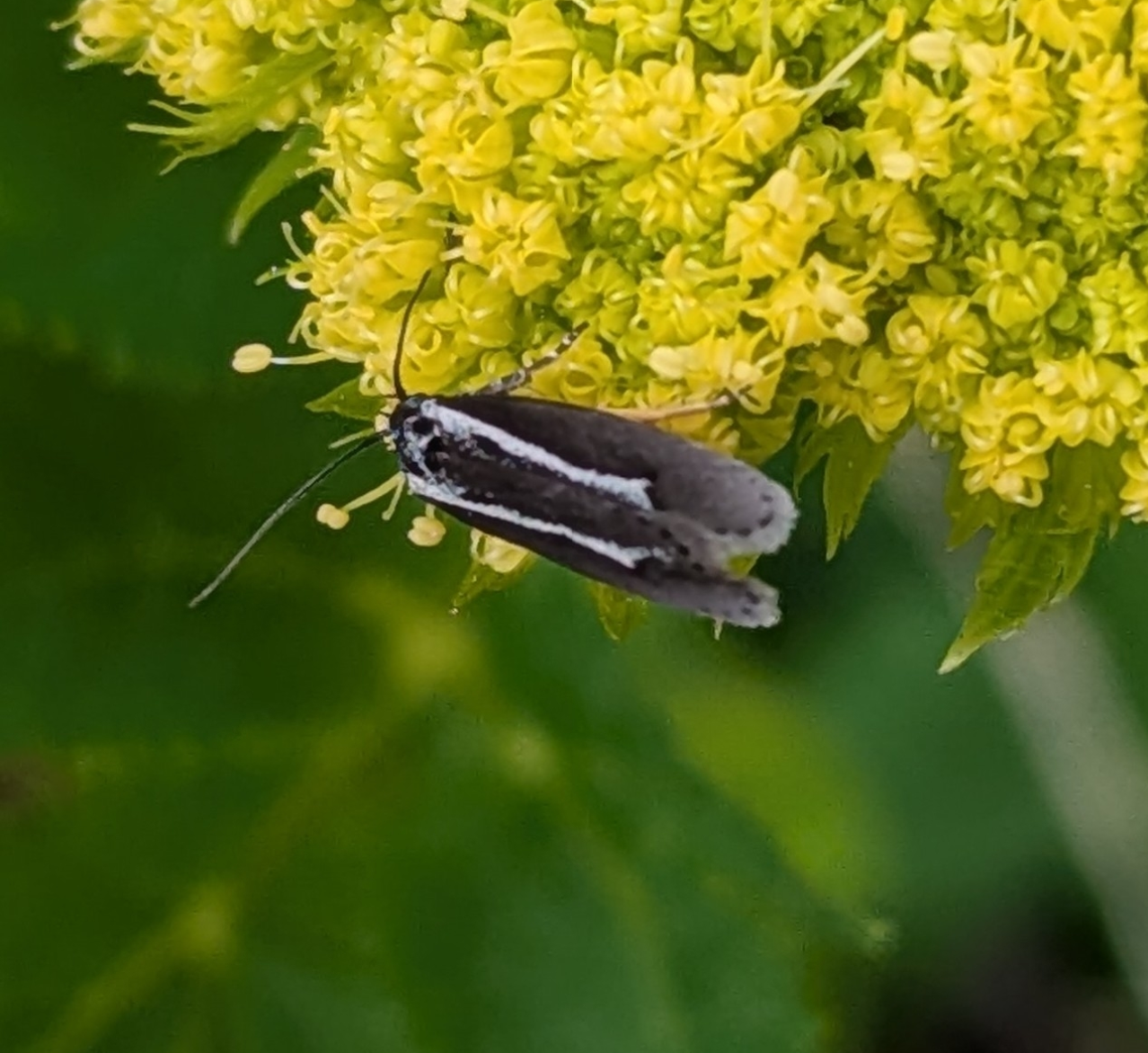

Scientific classification
- Kingdom: Animalia
- Phylum: Arthropoda
- Class: Insecta
- Order: Lepidoptera
- Family: Depressariidae
- Genus: Ethmia
- Species: E. albistrigella

Binomial name
- Ethmia albistrigella (Walsingham, 1880)

Synonyms
- Psecadia albistrigella Walsingham, 1880; Breckenridgia chrysurella Dietz, 1905

= Ethmia albistrigella =

Species of moth

Ethmia albistrigella is a moth in the family Depressariidae. It is found in North America from southern British Columbia southward in the Rocky Mountains to south-western Colorado and into the Wasatch Range in northern Utah. On the Pacific coast it ranges through western Washington and Oregon into the mountains of California. Subspecies icariella is an Arctic-Alpine zone race which has only been recorded from California.

The length of the forewings is 7.1–9.4 mm (0.28–0.37 in). The ground color of the forewings is dark blackish brown, darkest in the cell and paler toward the margins, with a distinct white longitudinal streak. The ground color of the hindwings is dark brown. Subspecies icariella is almost wholly black dorsally, including the abdomen. Adults are on wing from late April to early August.

The larvae feed on Phacelia ramosissima and possibly Lappula floribunda. Subspecies icariella probably feeds on Phacelia frigida.

== Subspecies ==
- Ethmia albistrigella albistrigella (southern British Columbia southward in the Rocky Mountains to south-western Colorado and into the Wasatch Range in northern Utah. On the Pacific coast it ranges through western Washington and Oregon into the mountains of California)
- Ethmia albistrigella icariella Powell, 1973 (Mono Pass, Inyo County, California)
