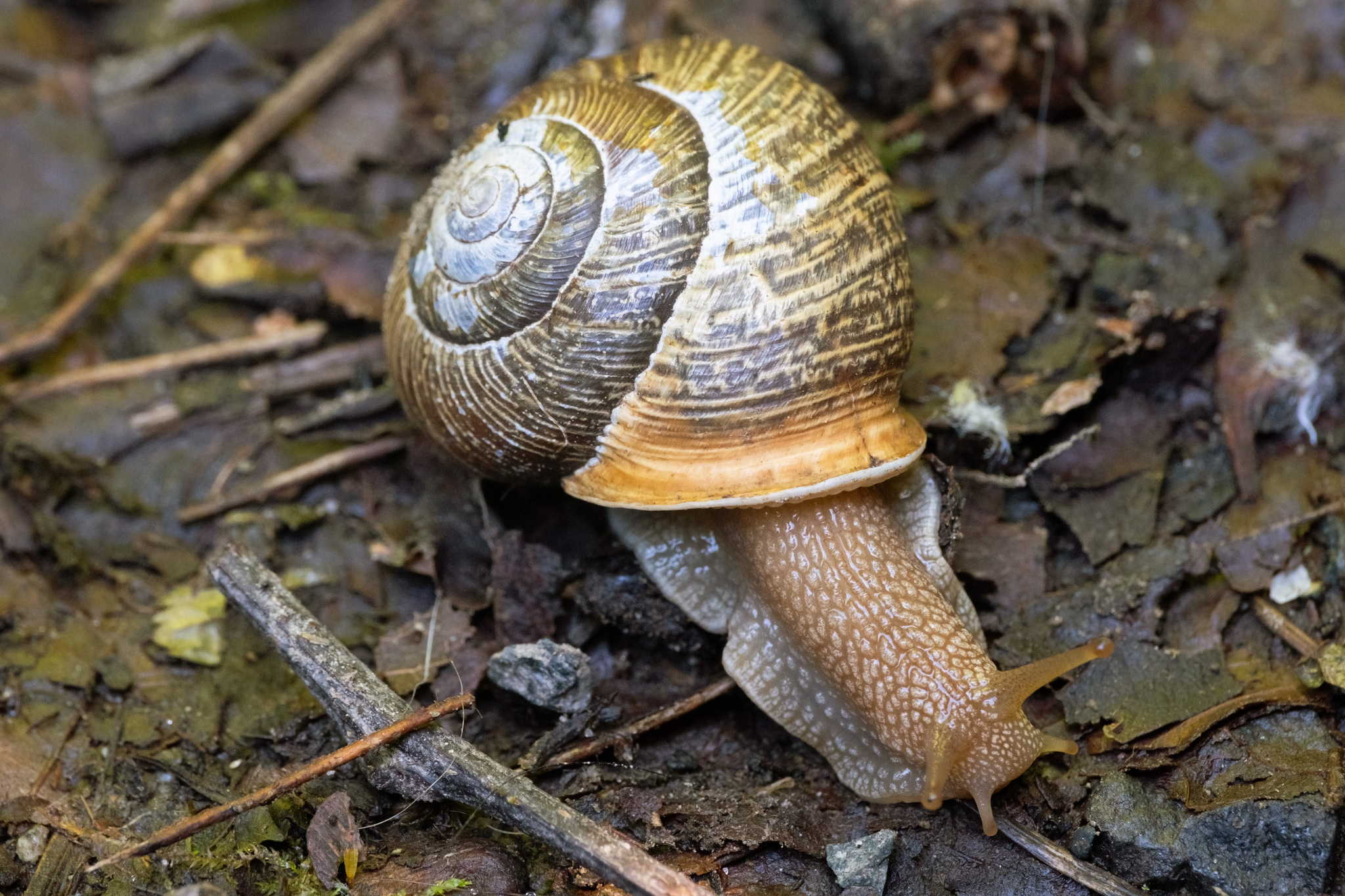
- Allogona townsendiana in Saint Edward State Park, Washington

Conservation status
- Vulnerable (NatureServe)

Scientific classification
- Kingdom: Animalia
- Phylum: Mollusca
- Class: Gastropoda
- Order: Stylommatophora
- Family: Polygyridae
- Genus: Allogona
- Species: A. townsendiana

Binomial name
- Allogona townsendiana (I.Lea, 1838)

= Allogona townsendiana =

Species of gastropod

Allogona townsendiana, common name the Oregon forestsnail, is a species of air-breathing land snail, a terrestrial pulmonate gastropod mollusc in the family Polygyridae.

== Distribution and conservation status ==
This snail species lives in British Columbia in Canada, and it is endangered species there. The Canadian Species at Risk Act listed it in the List of Wildlife Species at Risk as being endangered in Canada.
