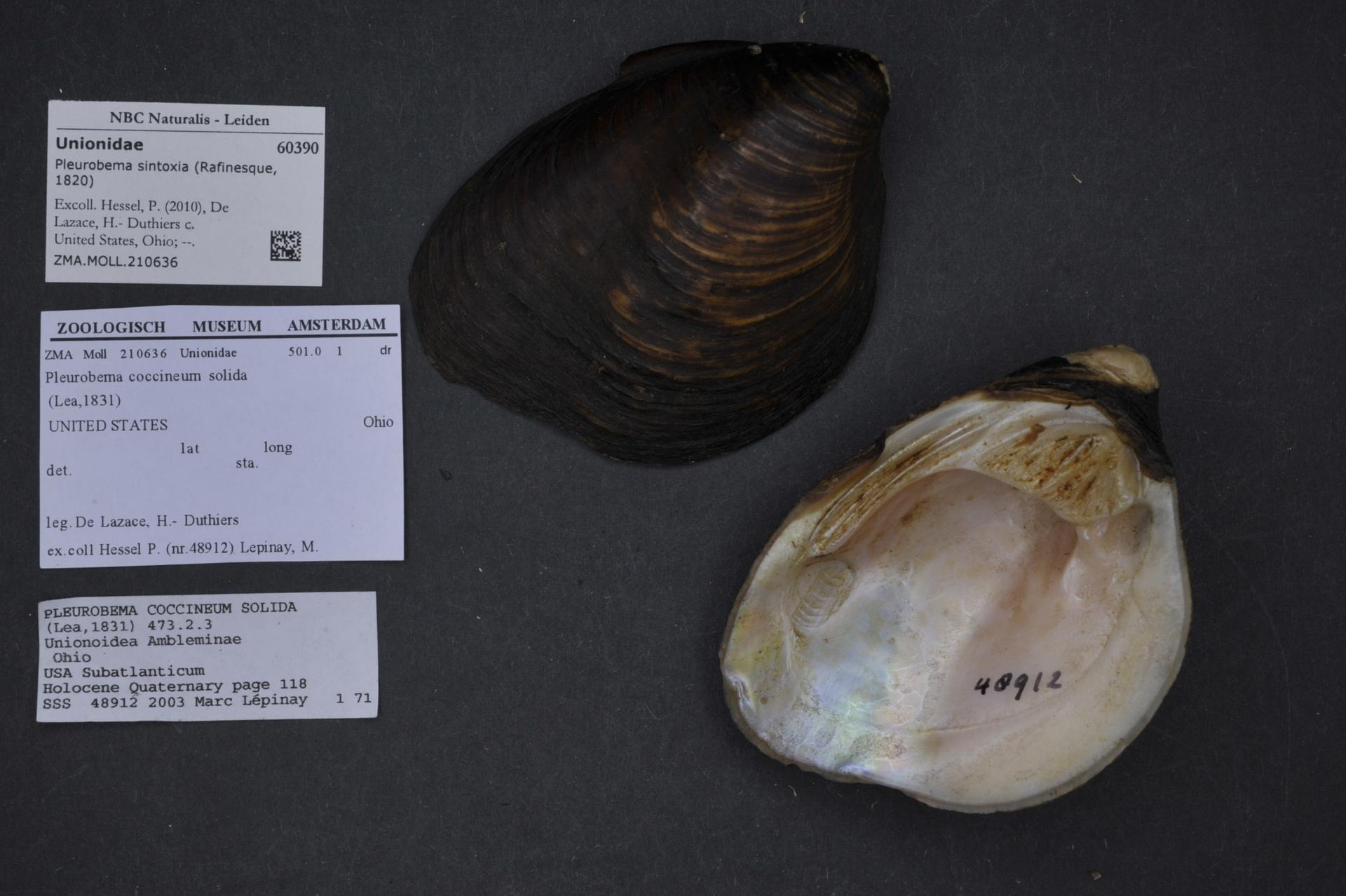

Conservation status
- Least Concern (IUCN 3.1)

- Apparently Secure (NatureServe)

Scientific classification
- Kingdom: Animalia
- Phylum: Mollusca
- Class: Bivalvia
- Order: Unionida
- Family: Unionidae
- Genus: Pleurobema
- Species: P. sintoxia

Binomial name
- Pleurobema sintoxia (Rafinesque, 1820)

= Pleurobema sintoxia =

Species of bivalve

Pleurobema sintoxia, the round pigtoe, is a species of freshwater mussel, an aquatic bivalve mollusk in the family Unionidae, the river mussels.

== Distribution and conservation status ==
This species is native to eastern North America. It is found in the drainages of the Ohio River, the St. Lawrence River, and the Great Lakes.

The Canadian Species at Risk Act listed it in the List of Wildlife Species at Risk as being endangered in Canada.
