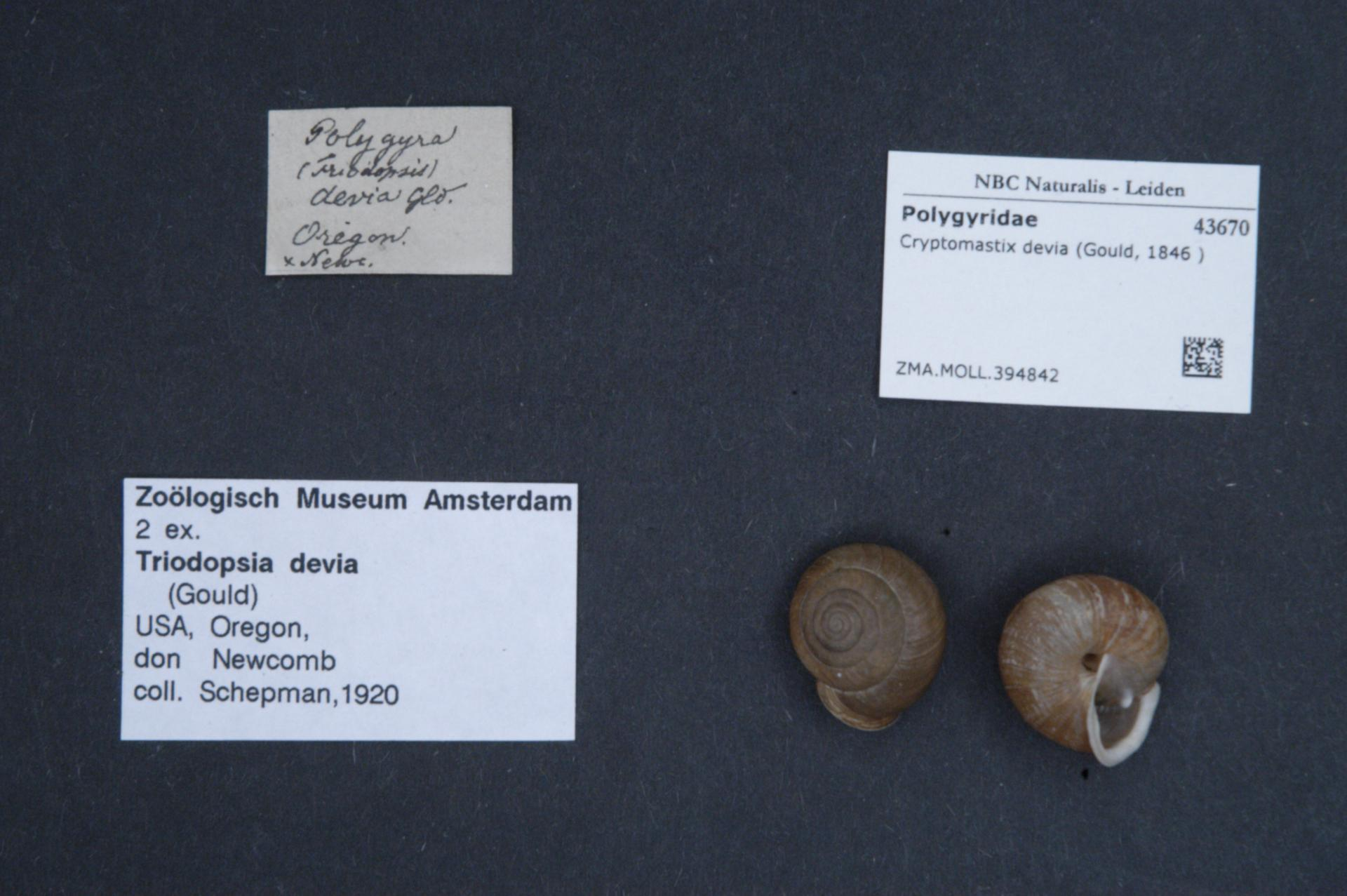

Conservation status
- Imperiled (NatureServe)

Scientific classification
- Kingdom: Animalia
- Phylum: Mollusca
- Class: Gastropoda
- Order: Stylommatophora
- Family: Polygyridae
- Genus: Cryptomastix
- Species: C. devia

Binomial name
- Cryptomastix devia (Gould, 1846)

= Cryptomastix devia =

Species of gastropod

Cryptomastix devia, common name the Puget Oregonian snail, is a species of air-breathing land snail, a terrestrial pulmonate gastropod mollusc in the family Polygyridae.

== Distribution and conservation status ==
This species lived in British Columbia. It has not been observed alive in Canada since 1905. It is listed as extirpated species (locally extinct in Canada) in List of Wildlife Species at Risk in Species at Risk Act in Canada. In the US, most occupied sites are in the Gifford Pinchot National Forest in southwestern Washington state. In Oregon, the Oregon Natural Heritage Program recently stated that this species is in severe decline, with only 13 out of 40 occupied sites having good viability. At most occupied sites for this species, only 1–3 snails were found. The US Fish and Wildlife Service recently determined that this snail may warrant endangered species protection due to threats to its habitat from logging, agricultural conversion, high intensity fires and tree mortality due to climate change.
