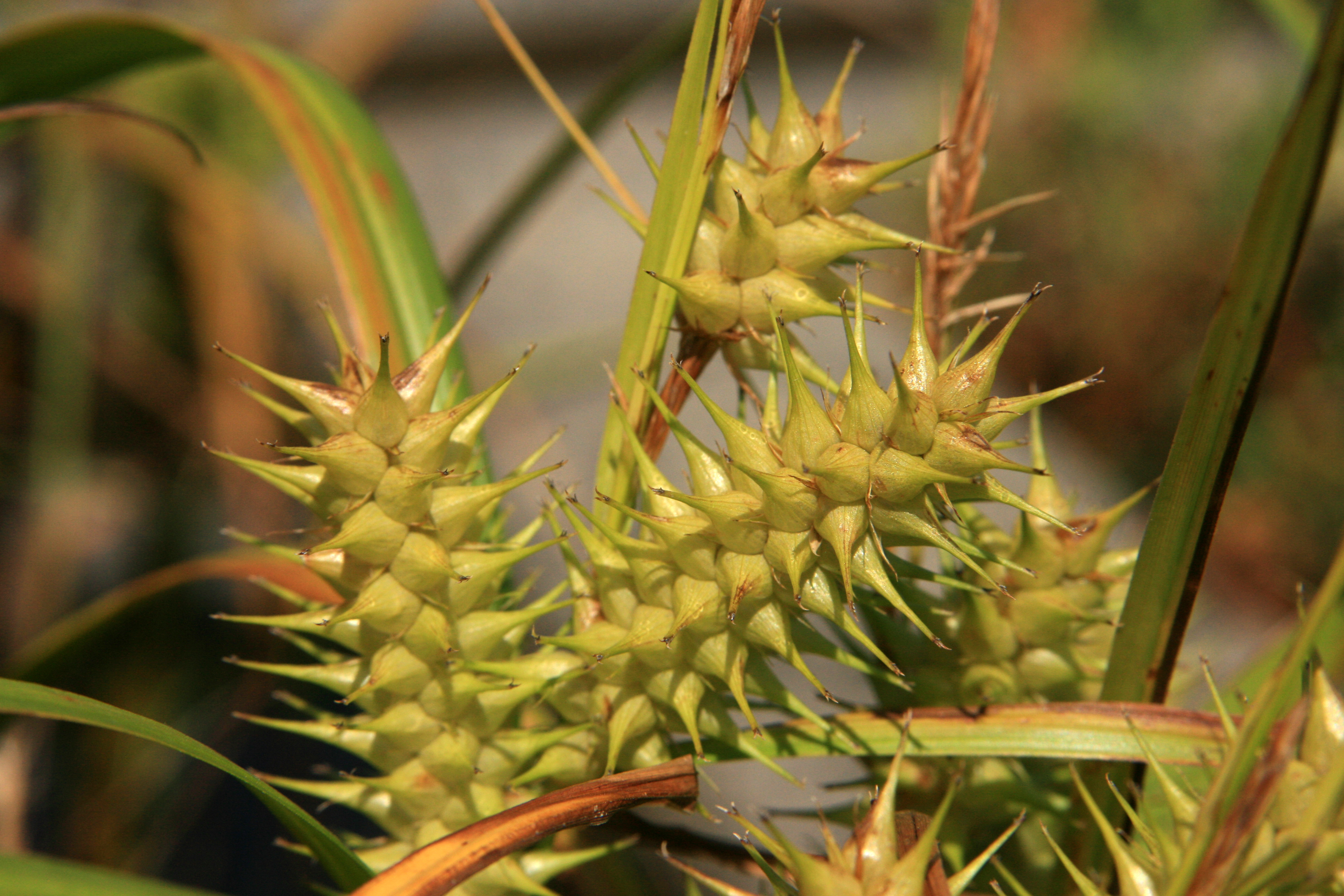

Scientific classification
- Kingdom: Plantae
- Clade: Tracheophytes
- Clade: Angiosperms
- Clade: Monocots
- Clade: Commelinids
- Order: Poales
- Family: Cyperaceae
- Genus: Carex
- Species: C. lupuliformis

Binomial name
- Carex lupuliformis Sartwell ex Dewey

= Carex lupuliformis =

Species of grass-like plant

Carex lupuliformis, common name false hop sedge, is a perennial sedge of sporadic distribution found in the floodplain forests and ephemeral woodland ponds of central and eastern North America. The species typically produces four to seven leaves with sheaths of distal leaves of 3 to 21 cm whose ligules are rounded to triangular. Carex lupuliformis blooms between early June and early October, typically with "two to six proximal female spikes, distal spikes usually crowded, ascending, densely flowered, usually cylindric, much longer than broad; one to two terminal male spikes." Fruiting occurs between late July through early October. Fruit is described as "perigynia ascending to spreading, inflated, strongly veined, sessile, lance-ovoid, shiny, glabrous; beak conical; achenes stipitate, broadly diamond-shaped, scarcely if at all longer than wide, concave faces, angles thickened, prominently knobbed with hard, nipplelike points."

== Conservation status ==
Carex lupuliformis is listed at the state and provincial level as endangered or threatened throughout much of its northern range, whose upper limit is southern Ontario and Quebec. It is also listed as endangered on Schedule 1 of the Species at Risk Act in Canada.
