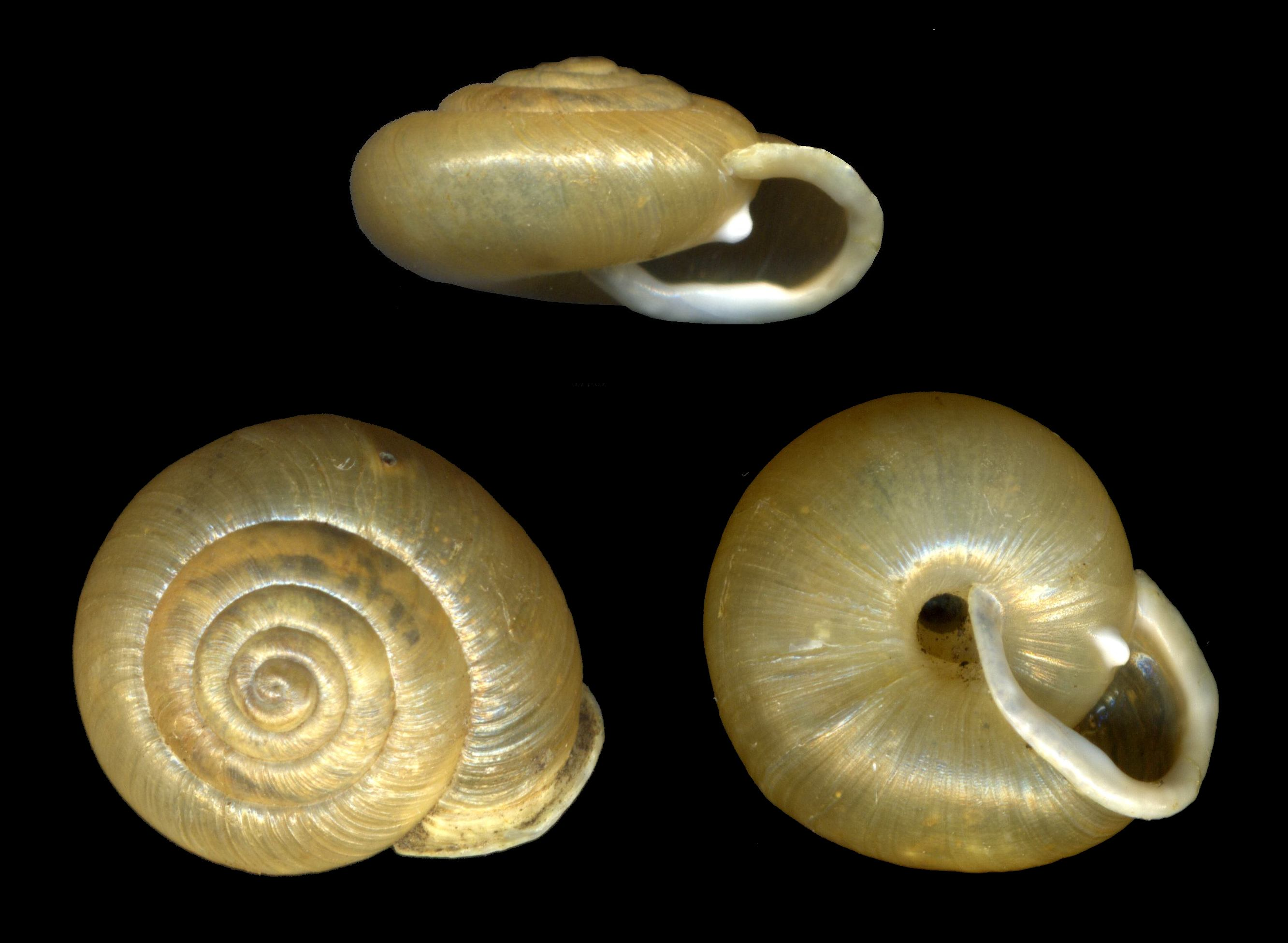
- Cryptomastix mullani clappi

Scientific classification
- Kingdom: Animalia
- Phylum: Mollusca
- Class: Gastropoda
- Order: Stylommatophora
- Family: Polygyridae
- Subfamily: Triodopsinae
- Tribe: Allogonini
- Genus: Cryptomastix; Pilsbry, 1939

= Cryptomastix =

Genus of gastropods

Cryptomastix is a genus of air-breathing land snails, terrestrial pulmonate gastropod molluscs in the family Polygyridae.

These snails cannot be differentiated from related polygyrids solely on the basis of their shell characters. Instead, the details of the male anatomy must be examined.

== Distribution ==
This genus of snails is restricted to the northwestern United States, and to adjacent areas of British Columbia, Canada.

== Species ==
This genus includes the following species:

- Cryptomastix devia (Gould, 1846); Puget Oregonian
- Cryptomastix germana (Gould, 1851); Pygmy Oregonian
  - Cryptomastix germana vancouverinsulae (Pilsbry and Cooke, 1922)
- Cryptomastix harfordiana (W. G. Binney; 1886); Salmon Oregonian
- Cryptomastix hendersoni (Pilsbry, 1928); Columbia Oregonian
- Cryptomastix magnidentata (Pilsbry, 1940); Mission Creek Oregonian
- Cryptomastix mullani (Bland and J. G. Cooper, 1861); Coeur d'Alene Oregonian
  - Cryptomastix mullani blandi (Hemphill, 1892)
  - Cryptomastix mullani clappi (Hemphill, 1897)
  - Cryptomastix mullani hemphilli (W. G. Binney, 1886)
  - Cryptomastix mullani latilabris (Pilsbry, 1940)
  - Cryptomastix mullani olneyae (Pilsbry, 1891)
  - Cryptomastix mullani tuckeri (Pilsbry and Henderson, 1930)
- Cryptomastix sanburni (W. G. Binney, 1886); Kingston Oregonian
