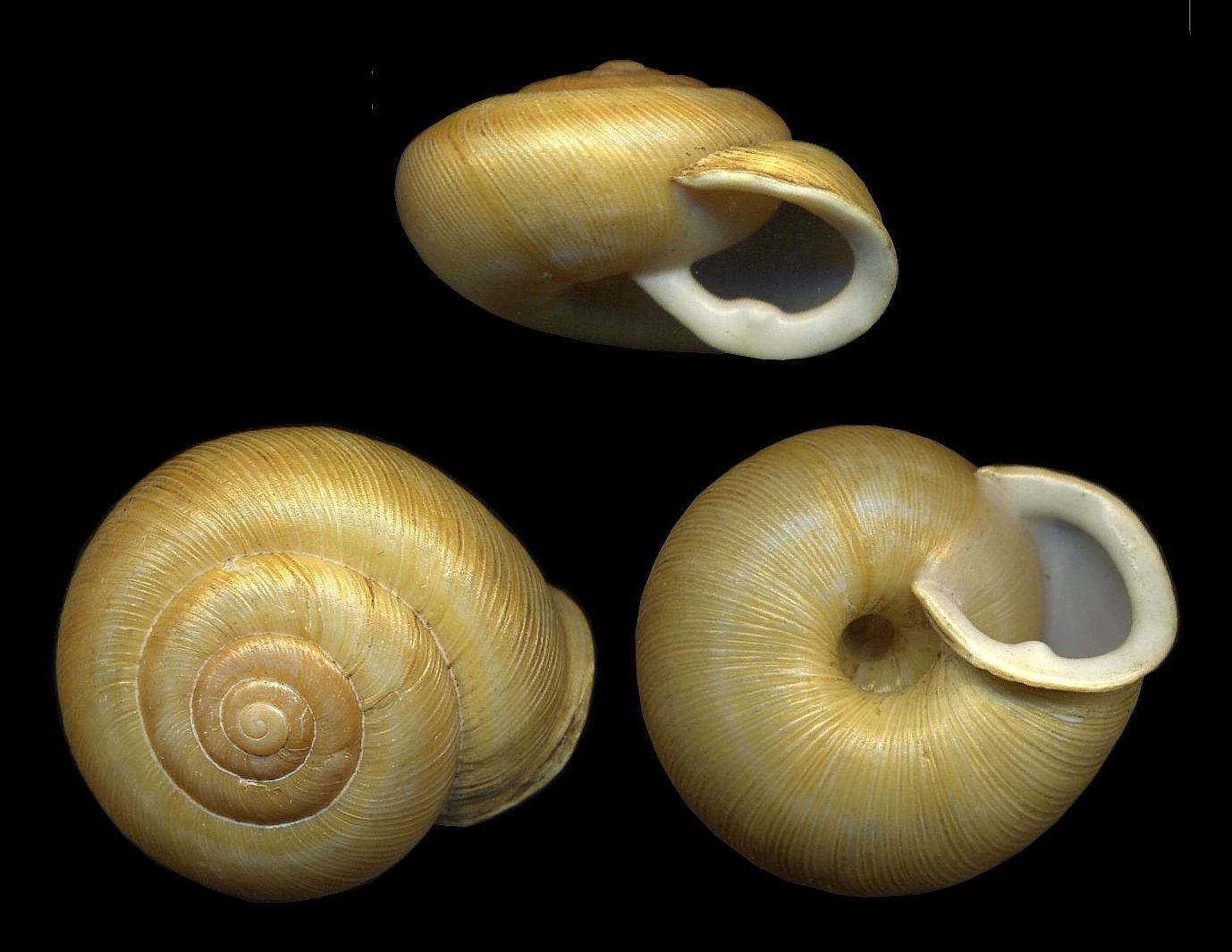

Conservation status
- Secure (NatureServe)

Scientific classification
- Kingdom: Animalia
- Phylum: Mollusca
- Class: Gastropoda
- Order: Stylommatophora
- Family: Polygyridae
- Genus: Allogona
- Species: A. profunda

Binomial name
- Allogona profunda (Say, 1821)

Synonyms
- Helix profunda; Helix richardii; Mesodon profunda; Polygyra profunda; Polygyra profunda alba; Polygyra profunda unicolor; Polygyra profunda efasciata; Polygyra profunda strontiana; Polygyra profunda pleistocenica

= Allogona profunda =

Species of gastropod

Allogona profunda, commonly known as the broad-banded forestsnail, is a species of air-breathing land snail, a terrestrial pulmonate gastropod mollusc in the family Polygyridae.

The broad-banded forestsnail is roughly 15 millimeters in height, and about twice as wide. Its shell is helix-shaped. Its body is gray, usually a lighter shade, and many specimens have a red stripe on their shells.

== Habitat and distribution ==
The broad-banded forestsnail is found in forests. It primarily lives on the floors of floodplains and related habitats. Like related species, it is believed to primarily eat fungi, and therefore it is attracted to log mold. It is distributed throughout North America; specifically in the United States and Canada.
