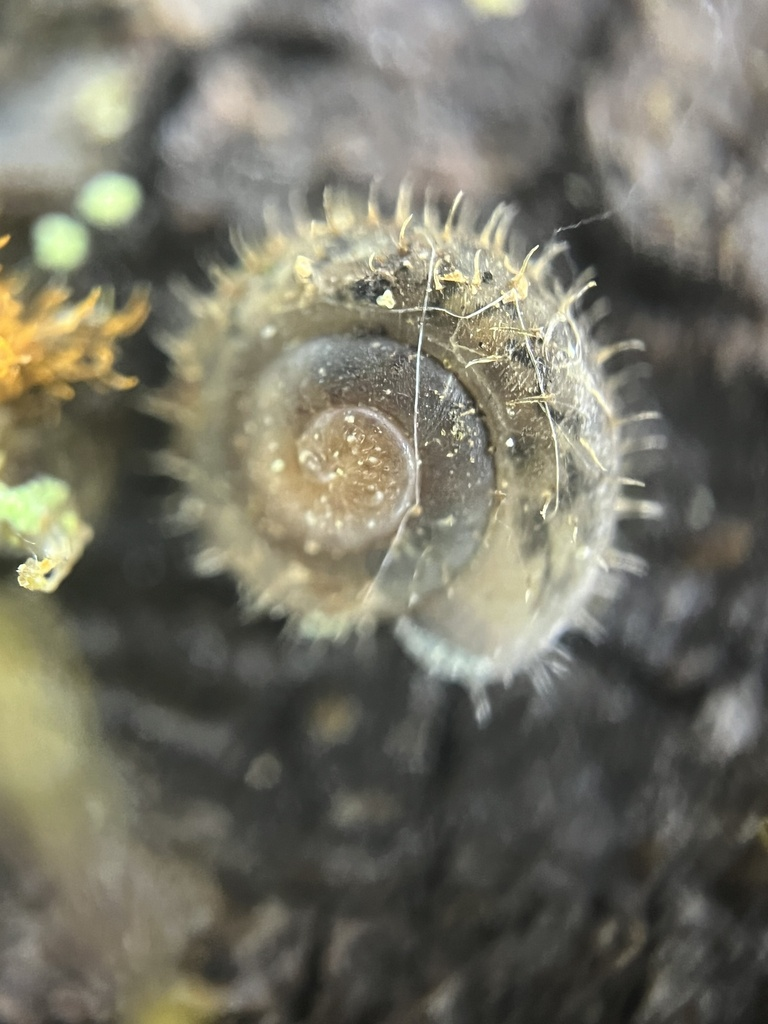
- Pygmy Oregonian found under a log on the Coal Creek Trail, a nature trail in Bellevue, Washington

Conservation status
- Apparently Secure (NatureServe)

Scientific classification
- Kingdom: Animalia
- Phylum: Mollusca
- Class: Gastropoda
- Order: Stylommatophora
- Family: Polygyridae
- Genus: Cryptomastix
- Species: C. germana

Binomial name
- Cryptomastix germana Gould, 1851

Synonyms
- Cryptomastix (Micranepsia) germana (A. A. Gould, 1851) alternative representation; Helix germana A. A. Gould, 1851 (original combination); Polygyra germana (A. A. Gould, 1851) superseded combination; Polygyra germana vancouverinsulae Pilsbry & C. M. Cooke, 1922 junior subjective synonym

= Cryptomastix germana =

Species of gastropod

Cryptomastix germana, or the pygmy Oregonian, is a terrestrial snail belonging to the family Polygyridae.

== Distribution ==
This species is endemic to the top half of the Pacific Northwest, with its range cutting off at the top of California.

== Appearance ==
This species is characterized by a hairy shell in a classical spiral shape. It also is very small, usually only a few millimeters (Usually about 2mm).The hairs are generally long, hooked and spiraling. It generally has a "Leopard print" pattern on the shell

== Similar species ==
The most similar species to this snail would be Vespericola columbianus, which also has a hairy shell, but is much bigger than the Pygmy Oregonian, and has shorter hairs.
