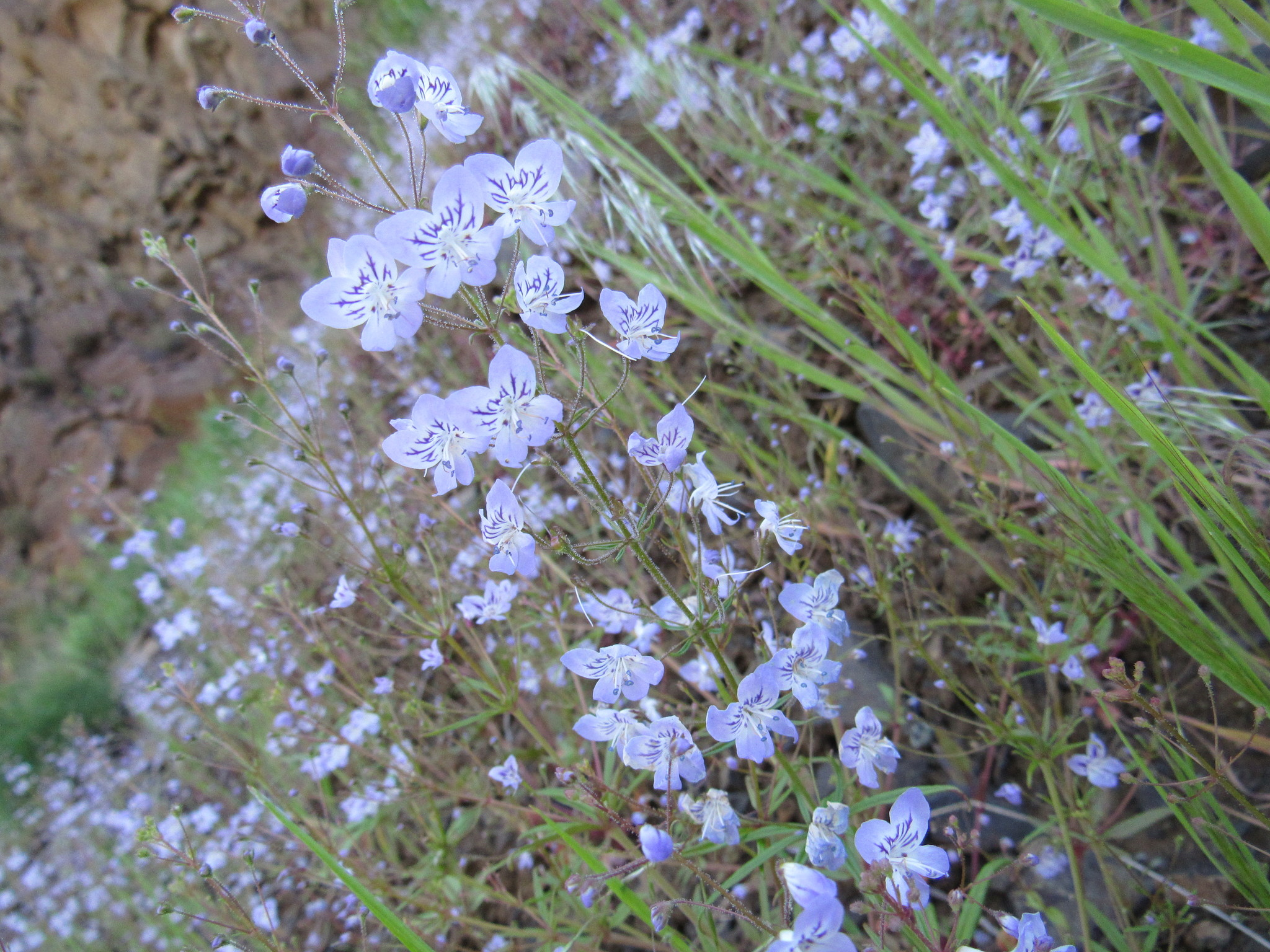
- Tonella floribunda

Scientific classification
- Kingdom: Plantae
- Clade: Tracheophytes
- Clade: Angiosperms
- Clade: Eudicots
- Clade: Asterids
- Order: Lamiales
- Family: Plantaginaceae
- Tribe: Cheloneae
- Genus: Tonella; Nutt. ex A.Gray (1868)

= Tonella =

Genus of flowering plants

Tonella is a genus of flowering plants belonging to the family Plantaginaceae.

Its native range is Northern America.

Species:

- Tonella floribunda A.Gray
- Tonella tenella (Benth.) A.Heller
