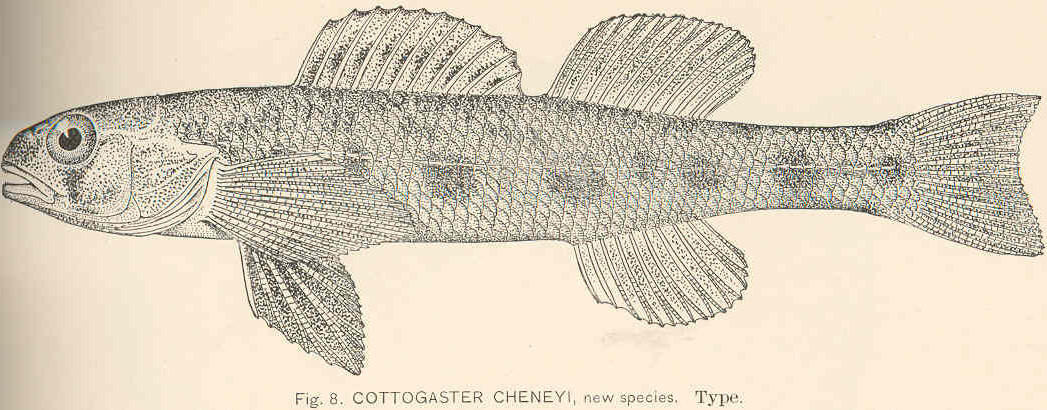

Conservation status
- Least Concern (IUCN 3.1)

Scientific classification
- Kingdom: Animalia
- Phylum: Chordata
- Class: Actinopterygii
- Order: Perciformes
- Family: Percidae
- Genus: Percina
- Species: P. copelandi

Binomial name
- Percina copelandi (D.S. Jordan, 1877)

Synonyms
- Rheocrypta copelandi D.S. Jordan, 1877; Cottogaster cheneyi Evermann & Kendall 1898; Ulocentra gilberti Evermann & Thoburn, 1896; Cottogaster putnami D.S. Jordan & Gilbert, 1883

= Channel darter =

Species of fish

The channel darter (Percina copelandi) is a species of freshwater ray-finned fish, a darter from the subfamily Etheostomatinae, part of the family Percidae, which also contains the perches, ruffes and pikeperches. It is native to North America where it typically occurs in the sandy or gravelly shallows of lakes and in small and medium-sized rivers in riffles over sand, gravel or rock bottoms. It is a small fish ranging from 34 to 72 mm (1.3 to 2.8 in) in length, olive brown with darker speckles and sometimes with a dark spot below the eye and dark blotches along the flank. It feeds mostly on insect larvae and other small invertebrates and breeds in small streams. This species is listed as threatened by the Canadian Species at Risk Act (SARA) but overall it has a wide range and numerous sub-populations and the International Union for Conservation of Nature has rated it as a "least concern species".

== Description ==
This is a small-sized fish between 34 and 61 mm in total length; some specimens as large as 72 mm. It is light sand or olive in colour with brown speckles on its back. A dark spot or bar may be present below the eye and extending onto the snout 8 to 18 brown oblong blotches along the lateral line linked by a thin brown line. The spawning male turns dusky with a blackish head. The fins are clear or lightly speckled and the first spiny dorsal fin usually has 11 rays.

The channel darter most resembles the river darter (Percina shumardi). It can be distinguished from the johnny darter (Etheostoma nigrum) and the tessellated darter (E. olmstedi), which have only one anal spine instead of two. It differs from the blackside darter (P. maculata) in usually having 11 rays on the first spiny dorsal fin instead of 13 to 14.

== Distribution ==
The fish is native to North America, where it has a highly localized distribution. It is uncommon in Canada but disjunct populations can be found in Ontario and Quebec. In Ontario, it is found in Little Rideau Creek, in tributaries of the Bay of Quinte, and in Lakes Erie and St. Clair. Along the Huron-Erie corridor, it has been collected from the St. Clair and Detroit Rivers. In Quebec, it occurs in some tributaries of the St. Lawrence and Ottawa Rivers. In the United States, the channel darter is more common, occurring in the Ohio and lower Mississippi basins.

== Habitat and life history ==
The channel darter prefers pools and riffles of small- to medium-sized rivers, but can also be found in shallow, slow current areas of large rivers. Substrate preferences include sand, gravel or rock. This fish has also been found in lakes along sand and gravel beaches where wave action is gentle and the current slow. Communal spawning occurs in the spring and early summer in upstream areas with moderate to fast current and over fine gravel or small rocks. Males establish breeding territories. Females spawn with successive males and lay 4 to 10 eggs in each nest; 350 to 700 eggs in total. There is no parental care.

== Diet ==
The channel darter is a benthic feeder, consuming insects that live on the substrate such as mayfly and midge larvae. It also eats algae and detritus.

== Conservation ==
In some places this fish is threatened by habitat loss due to sedimentation and deteriorating water quality from agricultural and urban development. In addition, activities which impede or slow water flow during spawning are a threat to the survival of this species. The introduced round goby (Neogobius melanostomus) may also compete with the channel darter for space and resources and is a potential predator of eggs. However, overall the channel darter has a wide range and large total population with many sub-populations, no particular threats have been identified and the International Union for Conservation of Nature has rated it as a "least concern species".

== Taxonomy ==
The channel darter was first formally described as Rheocrypta copelandi in 1877 by the American zoologist David Starr Jordan (1851–1931) with the type locality given as the White River in Indiana, 5 miles north of Indianapolis. Its specific name honors the American zoologist Herbert Edson Copeland (1849–1876).

== Sources ==
- Scott and Crossman 1998; Phelps and Francis 2002 (COSEWIC Status Report). Department of Fisheries and Oceans Canada, DFO/2005-860, Cat. No. Fs22-4/40-2005E-PDF ISBN 0-662-41520-5 DFO. 2010. Recovery potential assessment of Channel Darter (Percina copelandi) in Canada. DFO Can. Sci. Advis. Sec. Sci. Advis. Rep. 2010/058.
