= Salix jejuna =

Scientific classification
- Kingdom: Plantae
- Clade: Tracheophytes
- Clade: Angiosperms
- Clade: Eudicots
- Clade: Rosids
- Order: Malpighiales
- Family: Salicaceae
- Genus: Salix
- Species: S. jejuna

Binomial name
- Salix jejuna Fernald 1926

Species of willow tree

Salix jejuna, also scientifically referred to a Salix jejuna Fernald, and commonly known as the Barrens Willow, Calcerous Mat Willow, and Saule des landes (FR) is a dwarf shrub belonging to the willow family (Salix).

== Description ==
Salix jejuna, the barrens willow, is a tiny willow restricted to a 30 km stretch of coastal barren lands of the Strait of Belle Isle on the Great Northern Peninsula of Newfoundland. It is characterized as a woody shrub that grows around 1-2 cm in height. It was first found in Labrador by Archibald Gowanlock Huntsman in 1923 and then by Merritt Lyndon Fernald, Karl McKay Wiegand, and Long in 1925. Currently, it is limited to only eight remaining sites in Newfoundland. It grows in highly restricted limestone barrens where limestone crevices are found among thin soils that conceal fields of fissured limestone. It is characterized by small rounded leaves on short petioles growing close to the stems. The plant's growth architecture is twiggy flat mats that sprawl over the surface. Mats can extend to 30 cm in a couple of years. It flowers in late June to mid-July. Barrens willow's low-growing habit and spreading form allows it to take advantage of the sun-heated soil boundary and persist in harsh conditions including wind, wind-entrained ice, and soil frost heaving. Like all willows, it is a pioneer species.

== Threats ==
The main threat to S. jejuna is habitat degradation due to limestone extraction. Additional threats include the use of off-roading vehicles crushing plants and climate change potentially altering the limestone barrens habitat.

== Conservation Status ==
S. jejuna is considered critically endangered. It was assessed by the Committee on the Status of Endangered Wildlife in Canada (COSEWIC) in 2001 and determined to be an endangered species as listed in the Newfoundland and Labrador Endangered Species Act and the Canadian federal Species at Risk Act in 2002.
