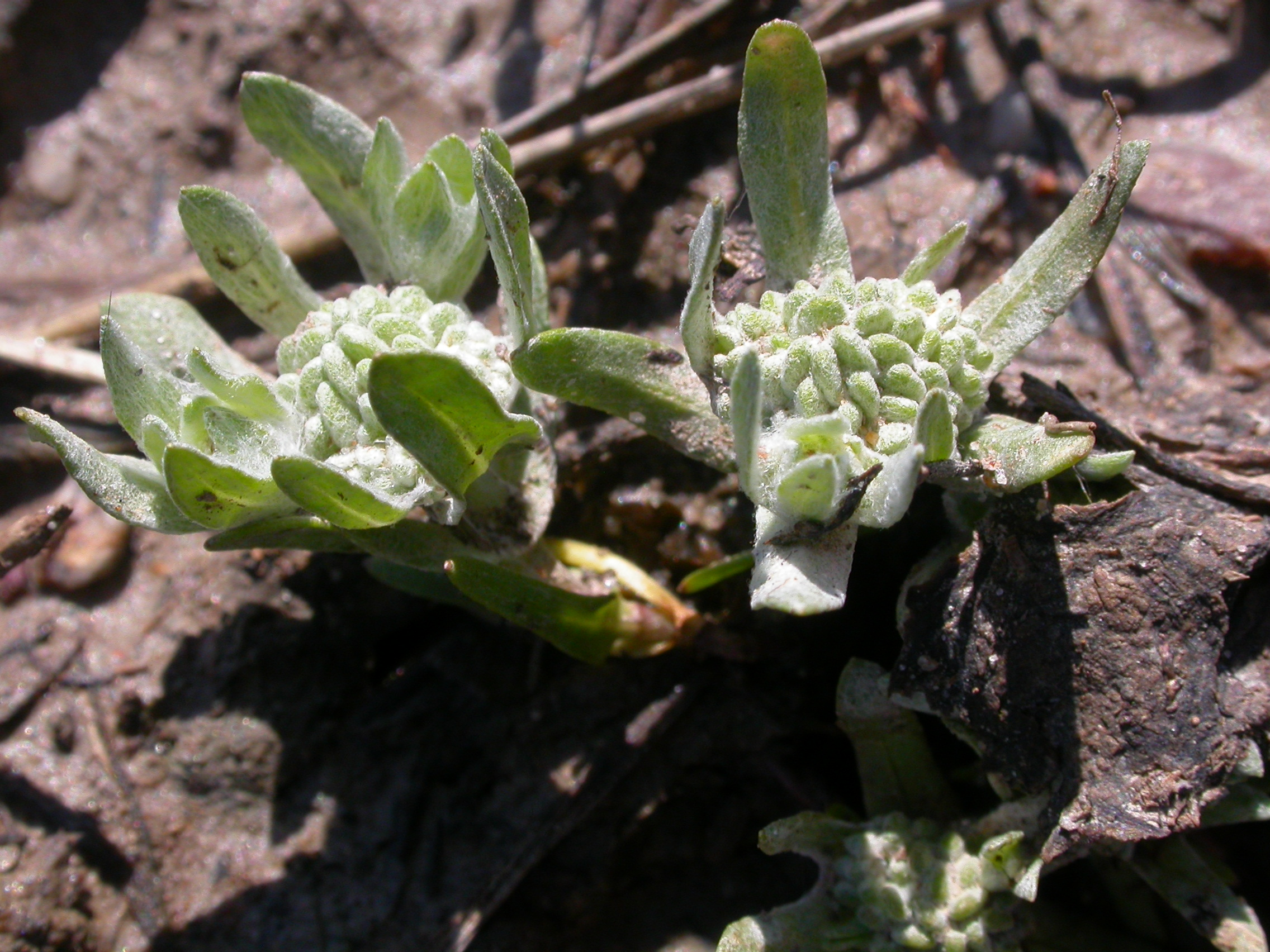
- Psilocarphus brevissimus

Scientific classification
- Kingdom: Plantae
- Clade: Tracheophytes
- Clade: Angiosperms
- Clade: Eudicots
- Clade: Asterids
- Order: Asterales
- Family: Asteraceae
- Subfamily: Asteroideae
- Tribe: Gnaphalieae
- Genus: Psilocarphus; Nutt.

Synonyms
- Bezanilla J.Rémy

= Psilocarphus =

Genus of plants

Psilocarphus is a genus of flowering plants in the tribe Gnaphalieae within the family Asteraceae.

Psilocarphus is known commonly as woolly marbles or woollyheads. It is native to western North America and southern South America.

Species

- Psilocarphus brevissimus - BC ALB SAS WA OR CA NV ID UT WY MT, Baja California, Chile, Argentina
- Psilocarphus chilensis - CA, Chile
- Psilocarphus elatior - BC WA OR CA ID MT
- Psilocarphus globiferus - Chile, Argentina
- Psilocarphus oregonus - CA OR WA NV ID, Baja California
- Psilocarphus tenellus - BC CA OR WA ID MT, Baja California

formerly included

Psilocarphus caulescens Benth.- Hesperevax caulescens (Benth.) A.Gray
