= Mission Creek Oregonian =

Conservation status
- Vulnerable (IUCN 2.3)

- Critically Imperiled (NatureServe)

Scientific classification
- Kingdom: Animalia
- Phylum: Mollusca
- Class: Gastropoda
- Order: Stylommatophora
- Family: Polygyridae
- Genus: Cryptomastix
- Species: C. magnidentata

Binomial name
- Cryptomastix magnidentata (Pilsbry, 1940)

Species of gastropod

The Mission Creek Oregonian, scientific name Cryptomastix magnidentata, is a species of air-breathing land snail, a terrestrial pulmonate gastropod mollusc in the family Polygyridae.

== Distribution ==
This species is endemic to the United States.
