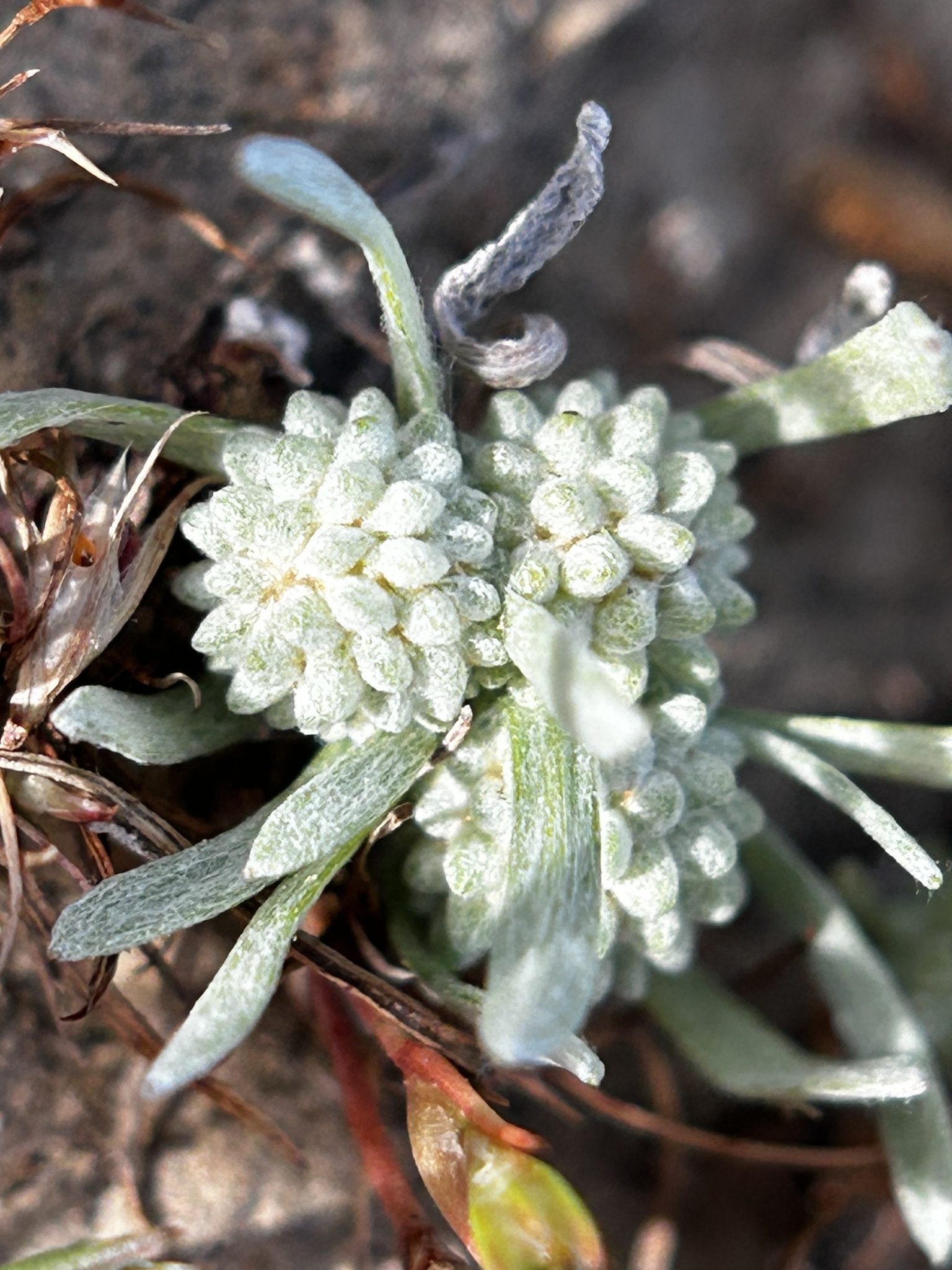

Scientific classification
- Kingdom: Plantae
- Clade: Tracheophytes
- Clade: Angiosperms
- Clade: Eudicots
- Clade: Asterids
- Order: Asterales
- Family: Asteraceae
- Genus: Psilocarphus
- Species: P. oregonus

Binomial name
- Psilocarphus oregonus Nutt.

= Psilocarphus oregonus =

Species of plant

Psilocarphus oregonus is a species of flowering plant in the family Asteraceae known by the common names Oregon woollyheads and Oregon woolly marbles. It is native to western North America from Washington and Idaho to Baja California, where it grows in seasonally wet habitat, such as vernal pools.

== Description ==
This is a small annual herb producing several stems just a few centimeters long which are coated in silvery or woolly fibers. The leaves are linear or lance-shaped and up to 2 centimeters long. The inflorescence is a small, spherical flower head only about half a centimeter wide. It is a cluster of several tiny woolly disc flowers surrounded by leaflike bracts but no phyllaries. Each tiny flower is covered in a scale which is densely woolly with long white fibers, making the developing head appear cottony.
