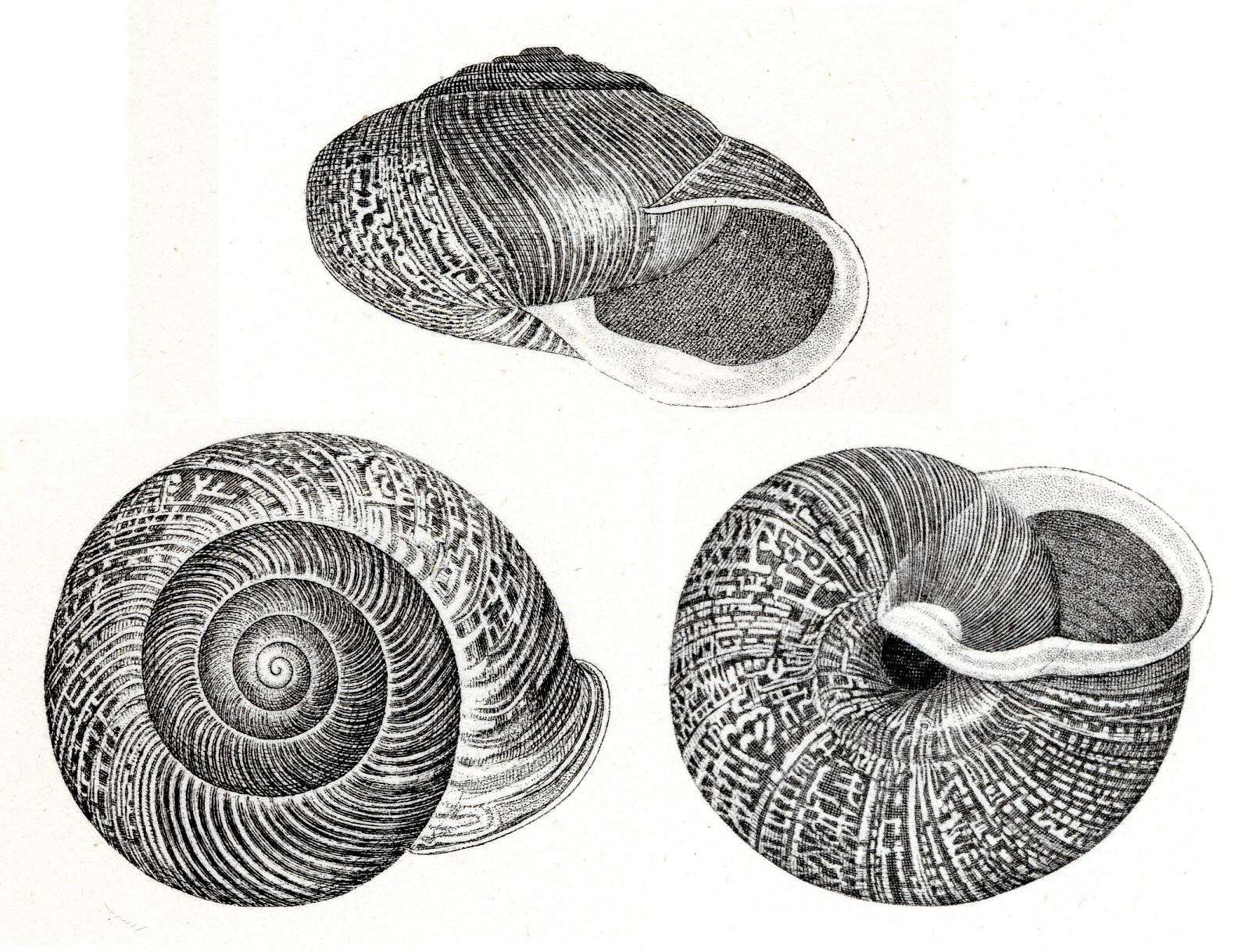
- Allogona townsendiana from W. G. Binney, 1878

Scientific classification
- Kingdom: Animalia
- Phylum: Mollusca
- Class: Gastropoda
- Order: Stylommatophora
- Family: Polygyridae
- Subfamily: Triodopsinae
- Tribe: Allogonini
- Genus: Allogona; Pilsbry, 1939

= Allogona =

Genus of gastropods

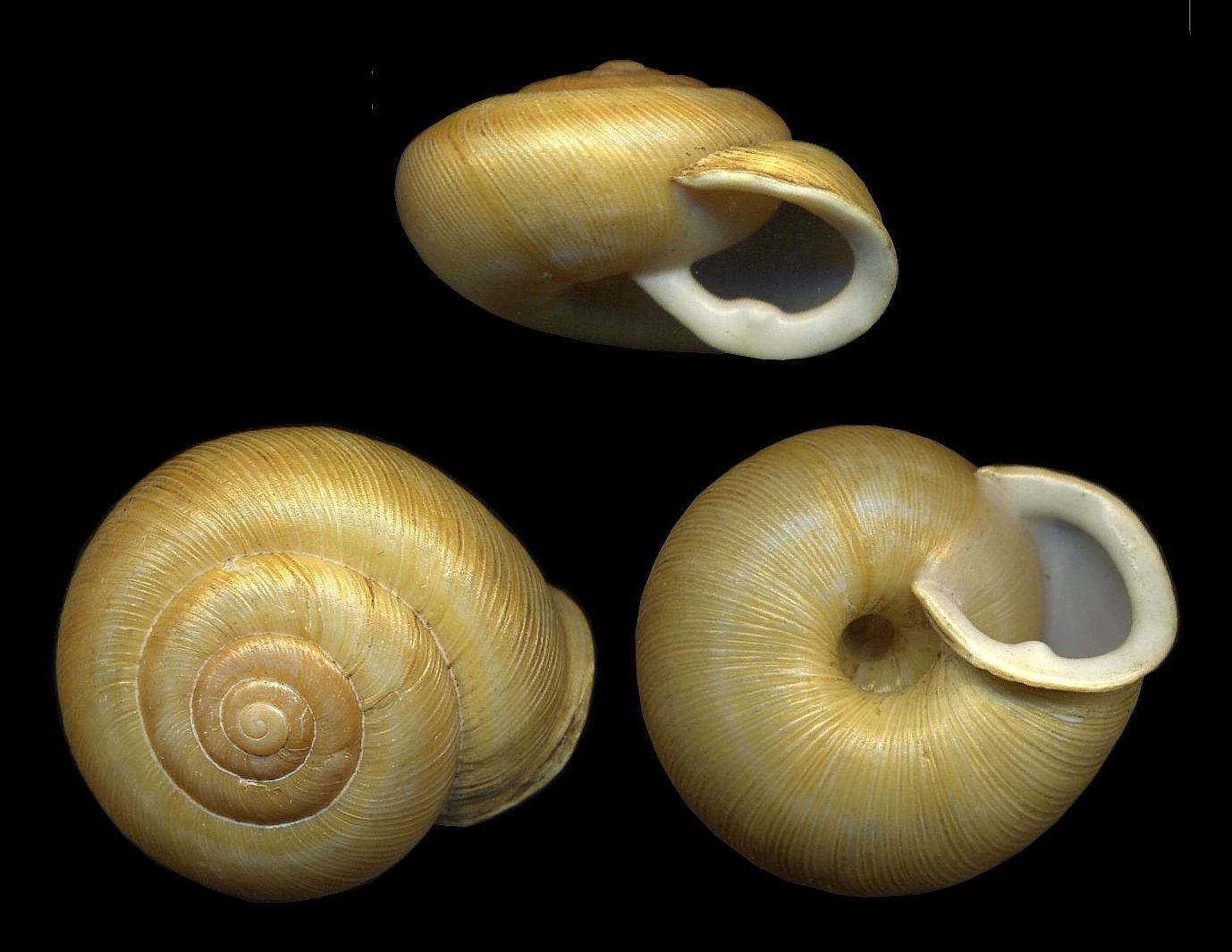
Allogona profunda

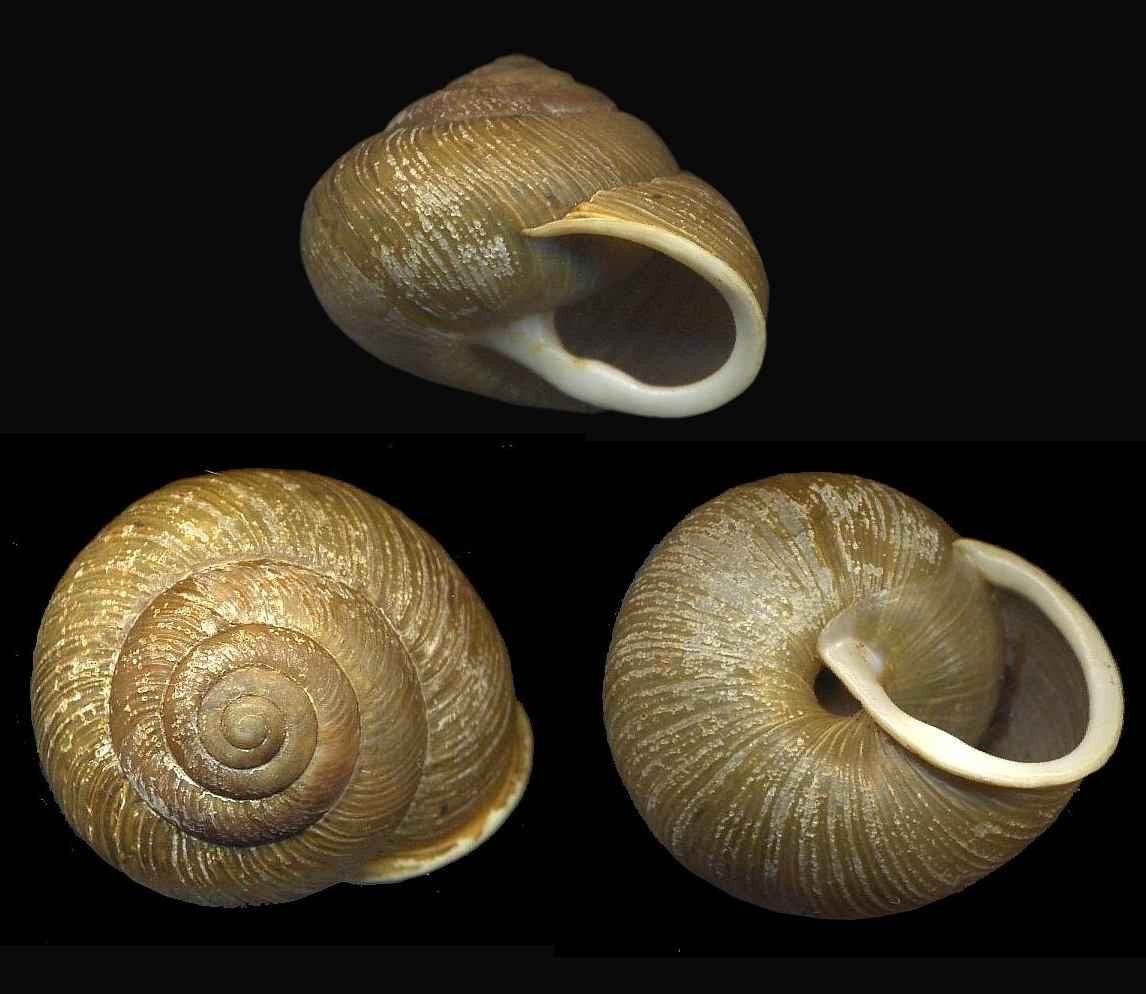
Allogona ptychophora

Allogona is a genus of air-breathing land snails, terrestrial pulmonate gastropod molluscs in the family Polygyridae.

The shell of this genus is not distinguishable from the shell of Triodopsis, but the male reproductive anatomy is unusual, and is characteristic for the genus. (The genus name, from Greek, means "different genitalia".)

== Species and subspecies ==
Species and subspecies within the genus Allogona include:

- Allogona profunda
- Allogona profunda strontiana
- Allogona ptychophora
- Allogona ptychophora solida
- Allogona townsendiana

The classic treatment of this group by Pilsbry divides the genus into two subgenera: Allogona s.s. for A. profunda and its subspecies, and Dysmedoma for the other members of the taxon.
