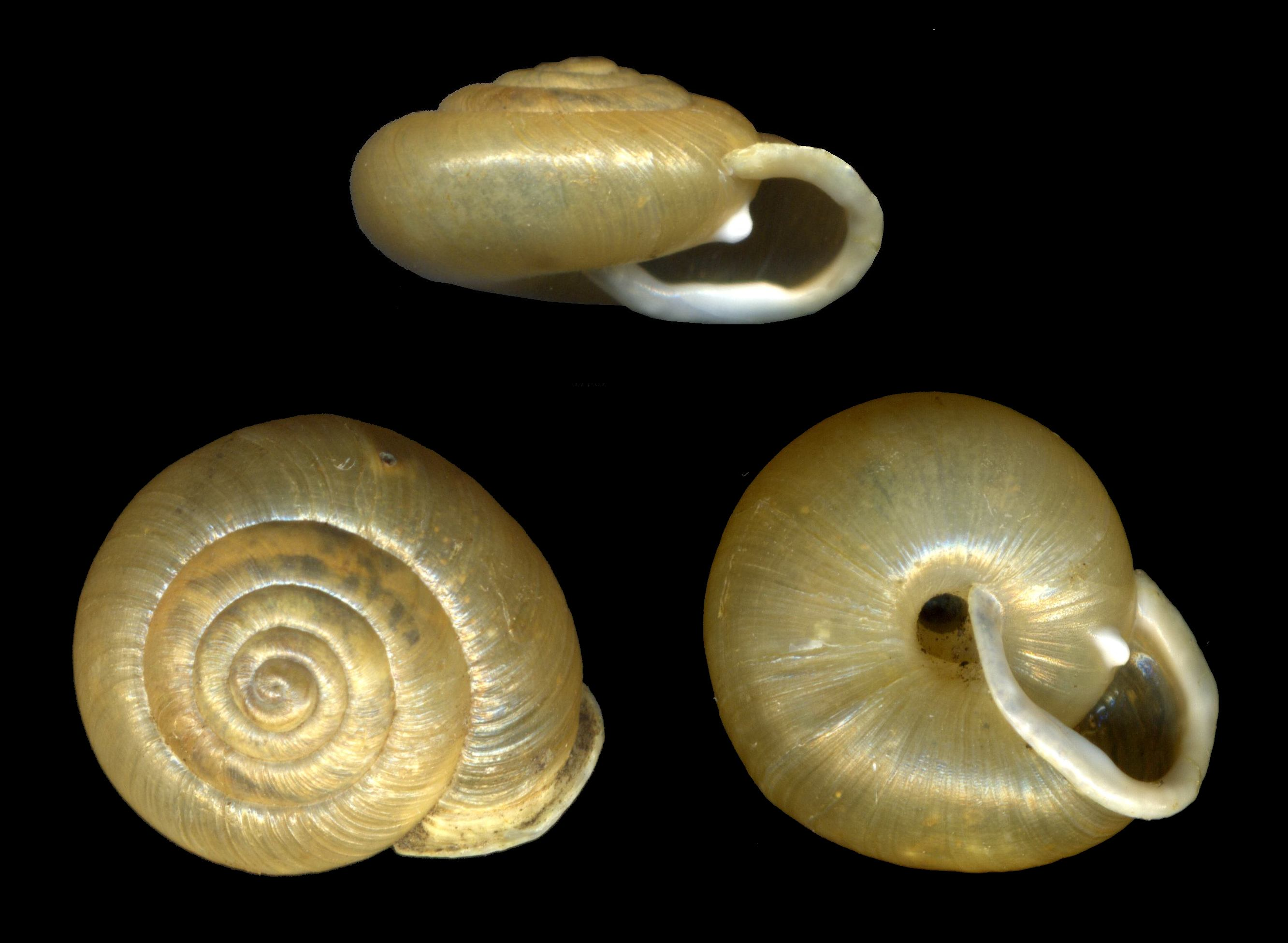
- Three views of a shell of Cryptomastix mullani clappi

Conservation status
- Apparently Secure (NatureServe)

Scientific classification
- Kingdom: Animalia
- Phylum: Mollusca
- Class: Gastropoda
- Order: Stylommatophora
- Family: Polygyridae
- Genus: Cryptomastix
- Species: C. mullani

Binomial name
- Cryptomastix mullani (Bland and J. G. Cooper, 1861)

= Cryptomastix mullani =

Species of gastropod

Cryptomastix mullani, commonly known as the Coeur d'Alene Oregonian snail, is a species of air-breathing land snail, a terrestrial pulmonate gastropod mollusc in the family Polygyridae.

== Subspecies ==
- Cryptomastix mullani blandi (Hemphill, 1892)
- Cryptomastix mullani clappi (Hemphill, 1897)
- Cryptomastix mullani hemphilli (W. G. Binney, 1886)
- Cryptomastix mullani latilabris (Pilsbry, 1940)
- Cryptomastix mullani olneyae (Pilsbry, 1891)
- Cryptomastix mullani tuckeri (Pilsbry and Henderson, 1930)
