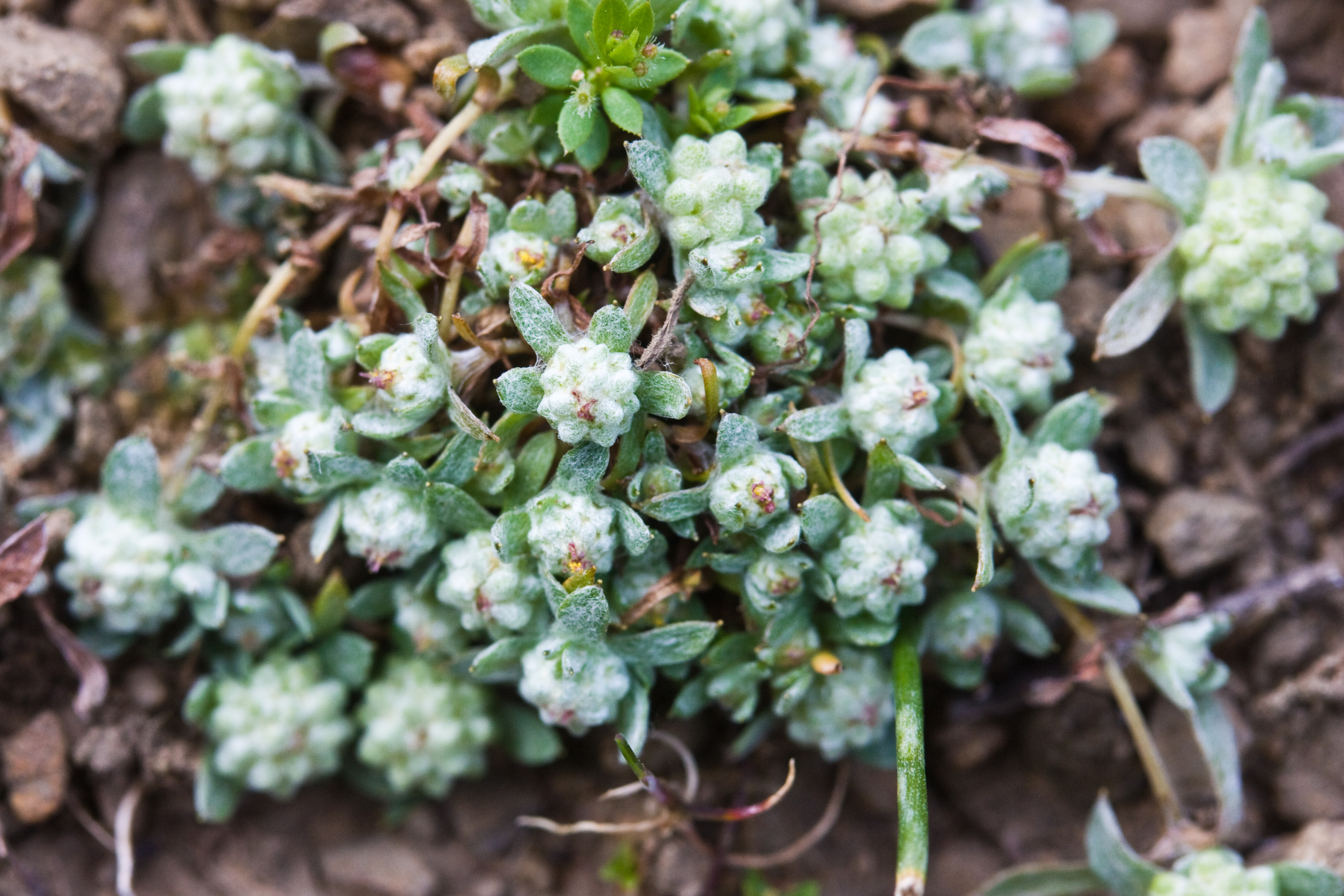

Scientific classification
- Kingdom: Plantae
- Clade: Tracheophytes
- Clade: Angiosperms
- Clade: Eudicots
- Clade: Asterids
- Order: Asterales
- Family: Asteraceae
- Genus: Psilocarphus
- Species: P. tenellus

Binomial name
- Psilocarphus tenellus Nutt.

= Psilocarphus tenellus =

Species of plant

Psilocarphus tenellus is a species of flowering plant in the family Asteraceae known by the common names slender woollyheads and slender woolly marbles. It is native to western North America from far southwestern British Columbia to Baja California, where it grows in seasonally wet habitat, such as vernal pools, as well as coastline and disturbed areas.

== Description ==
This is a small annual herb producing several stems a few centimeters long which are coated in thin to thick woolly fibers. The leaves are lance-shaped to oblong and under 2 centimeters in length. The inflorescence is a spherical flower head no more than half a centimeter wide. It is a cluster of several tiny woolly disc flowers surrounded by leaflike bracts but no phyllaries. Each tiny flower is covered in a scale which is densely woolly with long white fibers, making the developing head appear cottony.
