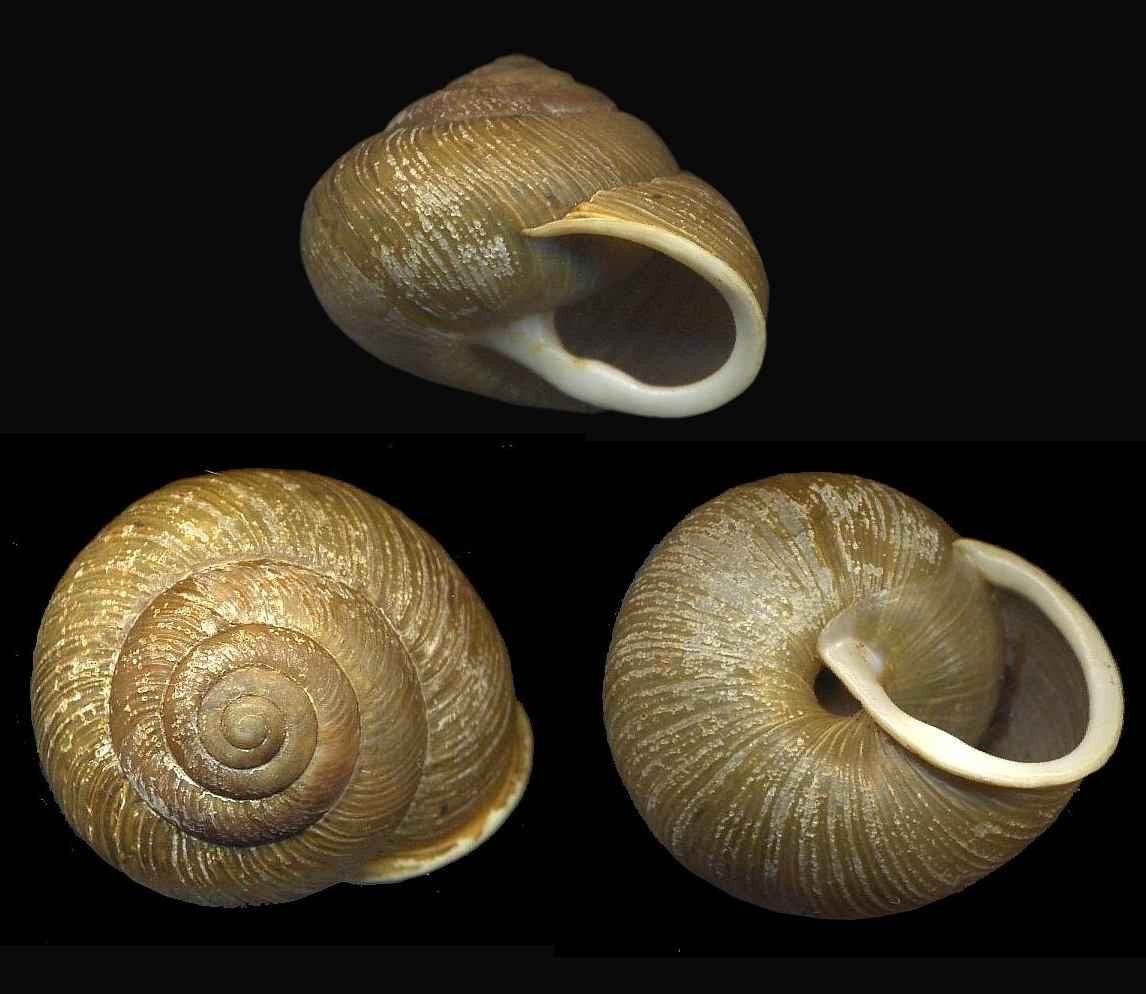

Conservation status
- Secure (NatureServe)

Scientific classification
- Kingdom: Animalia
- Phylum: Mollusca
- Class: Gastropoda
- Order: Stylommatophora
- Family: Polygyridae
- Genus: Allogona
- Species: A. ptychophora

Binomial name
- Allogona ptychophora (A. D. Brown, 1870)

= Allogona ptychophora =

Species of gastropod

Allogona ptychophora, common name Idaho forestsnail, is a species of air-breathing land snail, a terrestrial pulmonate gastropod mollusc in the family Polygyridae.

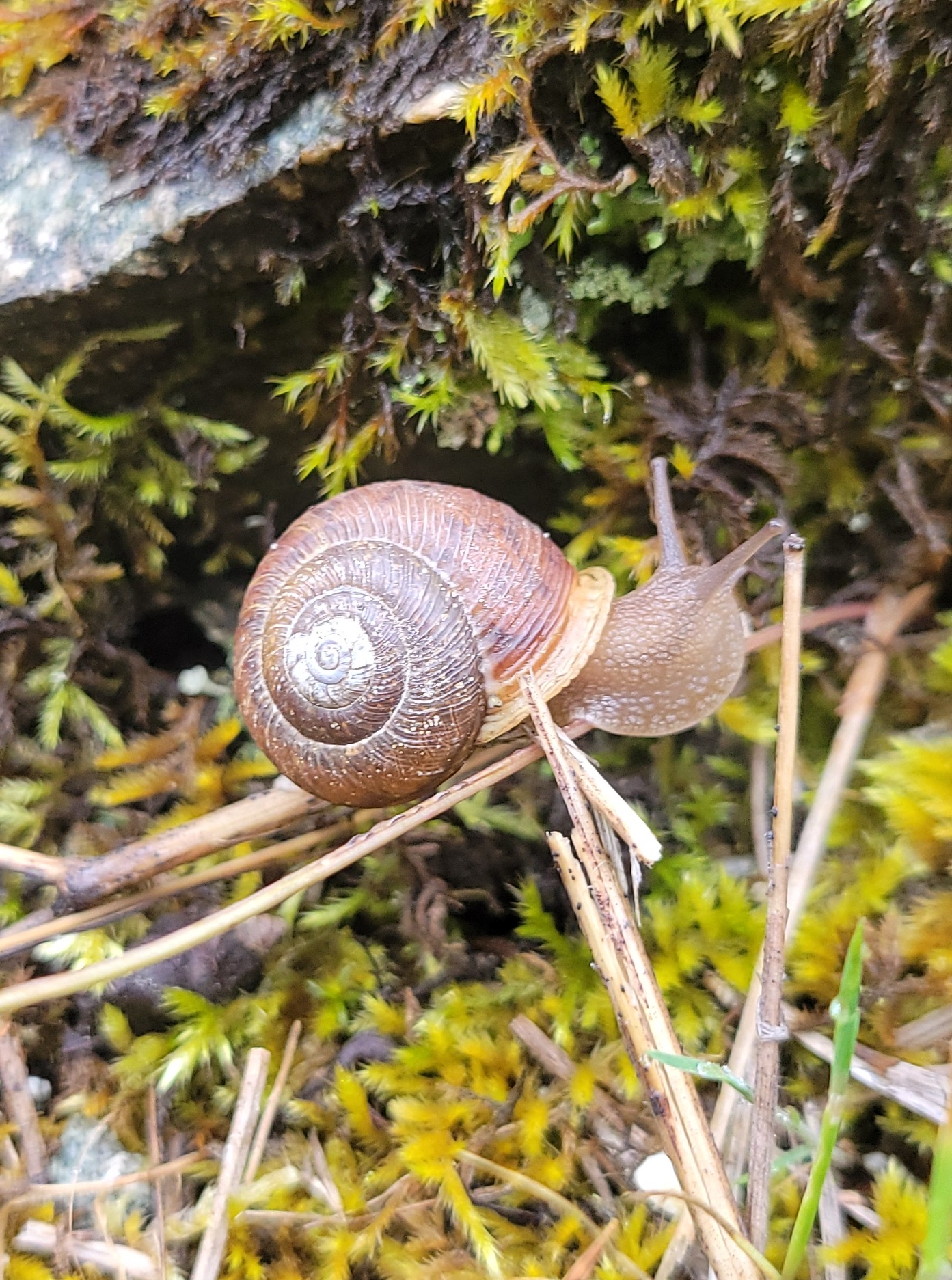
Idaho forestsnail

== Description ==
The shell of an Idaho forestsnail is up to 24 mm in diameter and 15 mm in height, and is heliciform with up to 5 3/4 whorls. The shell is covered with a light brown periostracum that wears away over time, and incrementally has lighter striations and axial riblets. The aperture is oval, white, and slightly thickened near the base with a callus.

It can be found in northern Idaho, western Montana, eastern Washington, and southeastern British Columbia.
