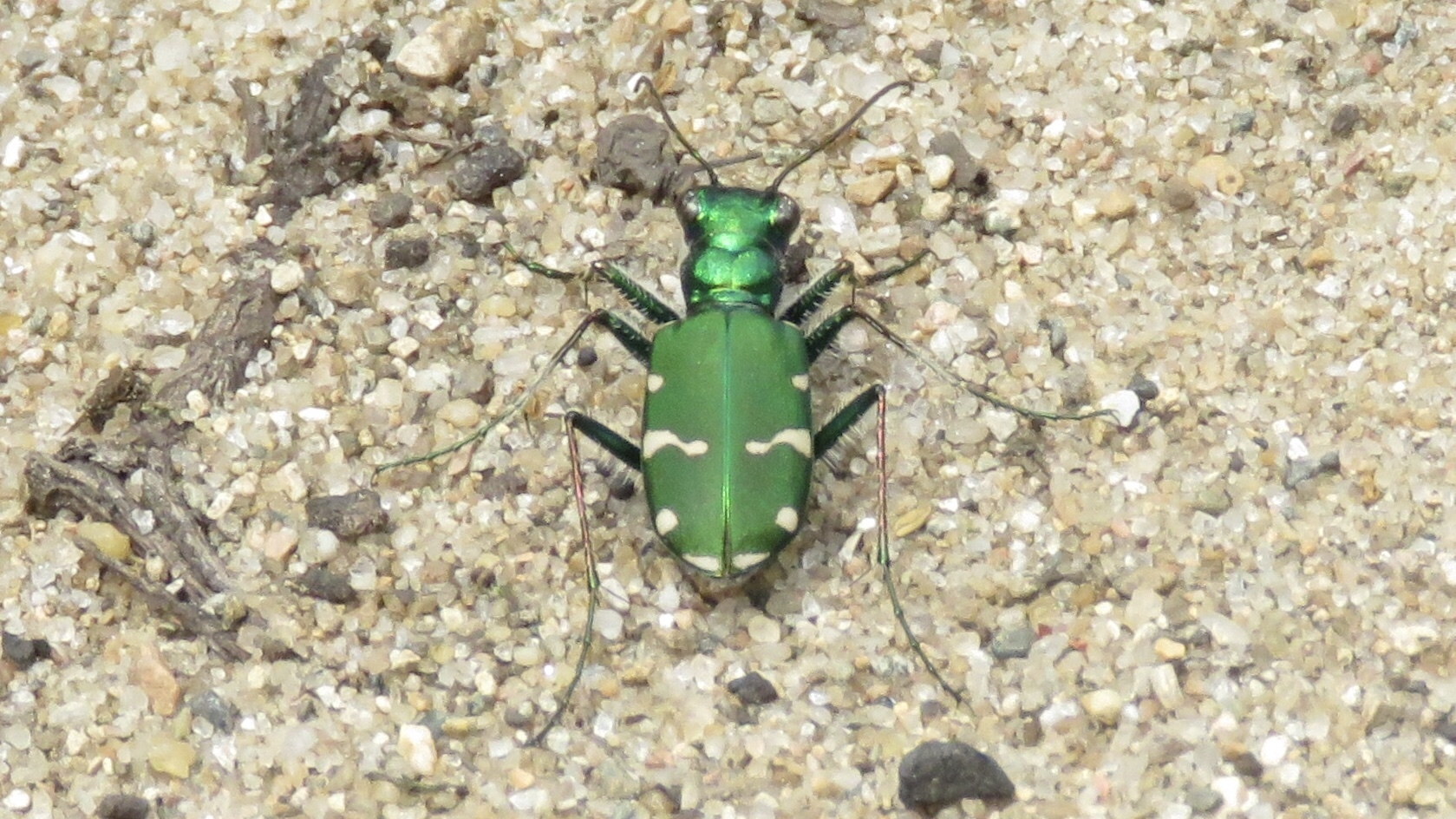

Conservation status
- Vulnerable (NatureServe)

Scientific classification
- Kingdom: Animalia
- Phylum: Arthropoda
- Clade: Pancrustacea
- Class: Insecta
- Order: Coleoptera
- Suborder: Adephaga
- Family: Cicindelidae
- Genus: Cicindela
- Species: C. patruela

Binomial name
- Cicindela patruela Dejean, 1825

= Cicindela patruela =

Species of beetle

Cicindela patruela, the northern barrens tiger beetle, is a species of tiger beetle (family Cicindelidae) found in eastern North America. Due to their specific habitat requirements as well as human involvement, populations of this species have declined significantly in several regions, including most of New England, Ontario, and Quebec.

== Taxonomy ==
Cicindela patruela is a member of the large genus Cicindela. Two subspecies of C. patruela have been recognized:

• Cicindela patruela constenantea Dejean,1825. Found primarily in the New Jersey Pine Barrens.

• Cicindela patruela patruela Dejean, 1825. Found throughout the same range as C. patruela.

== Description ==
Adult beetles are medium sized, often with a length between 12 and 15 millimeters. They are metallic green with ivory bands emerging from the radial field of their elytra. The middlemost band typically transverses the elytra. Cicindela patruela constenantea is metallic black, with the same ivory banding pattern.

The larvae of this species resemble other Cicindela larvae, with a whitish body and a sclerotized head with large mandibles that are used to capture prey.

== Life history ==
Cicindela patruela has a two year life cycle. Adults will mate and lay eggs during May and June, eventually dying by July. The eggs will hatch in July, and larvae will burrow underground after hatching. At this stage, larvae are carnivorous and will eat prey that pass by their burrow. Larvae will remain subterranean until the following spring, where they will emerge as adults.

== Habitat and distribution ==
Cicindela patruela has very specific habitat requirements. They can be found in pine or oak barrens, savannahs dominated by pine and oak trees, and areas containing lichen, moss, and/or eroded sandstone.

While C. patruela has been found in multiple states and provinces across eastern North America, they are only present in small, isolated areas in this region. Cicindela patruela can be found in the New Jersey pine barrens, the Shawangunk mountains in New York, Pinery Provincial Park in southern Ontario, certain regions of the Appalachian mountains, the Valley-and-Ridge of Maryland, and other specific areas in the Northeast. This species can also be found in Minnesota, Wisconsin, and Michigan.

== Conservation efforts ==
Cincindela patruela has been listed as “Vulnerable” by NatureServe. Several previously recorded populations of this species have declined significantly or have been fully extirpated throughout the east coast, particularly in Minnesota, New York, Maryland, Ontario, and Quebec. The species has not been reviewed by IUCN. In 2009, the government of Canada deemed the species endangered. A recovery strategy for the beetle was released in 2021, intending to conserve and recover their populations in Quebec and Ontario.

A prominent threat of extinction for Cicindela patruela is the suppression of natural groundfires. These seasonal fires lead to a more open habitat, which allows the beetle to hunt more effectively. When these fires are suppressed by human interference, this negatively alters their required microhabitat. Other threats impacting this species include ATV usage, pesticide usage, and logging.

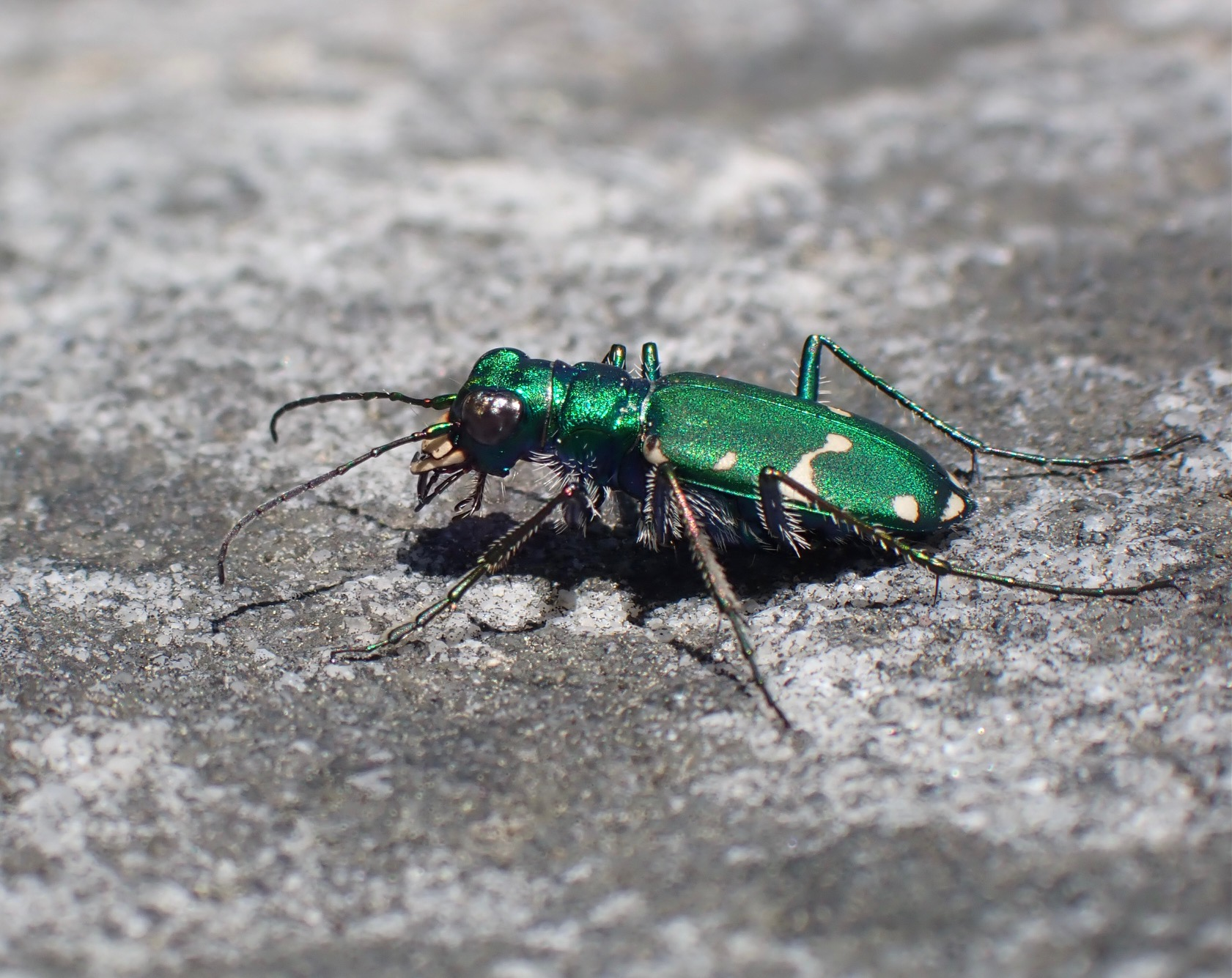
Cicindela patruela found in Minnewaska State Park
