= Heterodermia sitchensis =

Conservation status
- Imperiled (NatureServe)

Scientific classification
- Kingdom: Fungi
- Division: Ascomycota
- Class: Lecanoromycetes
- Order: Caliciales
- Family: Physciaceae
- Genus: Heterodermia
- Species: H. sitchensis

Binomial name
- Heterodermia sitchensis Goward & W.J.Noble (1985)

Species of lichen

Heterodermia sitchensis is a species of foliose lichen, first described by Trevor Goward and Wila Noble in 1985. The name sitchensis, meaning "from Sitka", reflects its exclusive dependence on Sitka spruce twigs, since it is found on no other tree species.

== Range ==
This lichen is known from highly specific areas of coastal British Columbia and Oregon. In B.C., it occurs only on the outer side of Vancouver Island stretching from Pacific Rim National Park northward just over 200km. In Oregon, there are two individual spots known, one in an old-growth Hemlock forest, and one amongst Sitka spruce and Shore Pines in a dune environment.

== Habitat ==
Within its range, it inhabits only old Sitka spruce that are directly at the seaside, on small-diameter twigs. It seems to particularly benefit from nitrogen-enriched sites such as sea lion haul-outs and bird nest sites.
