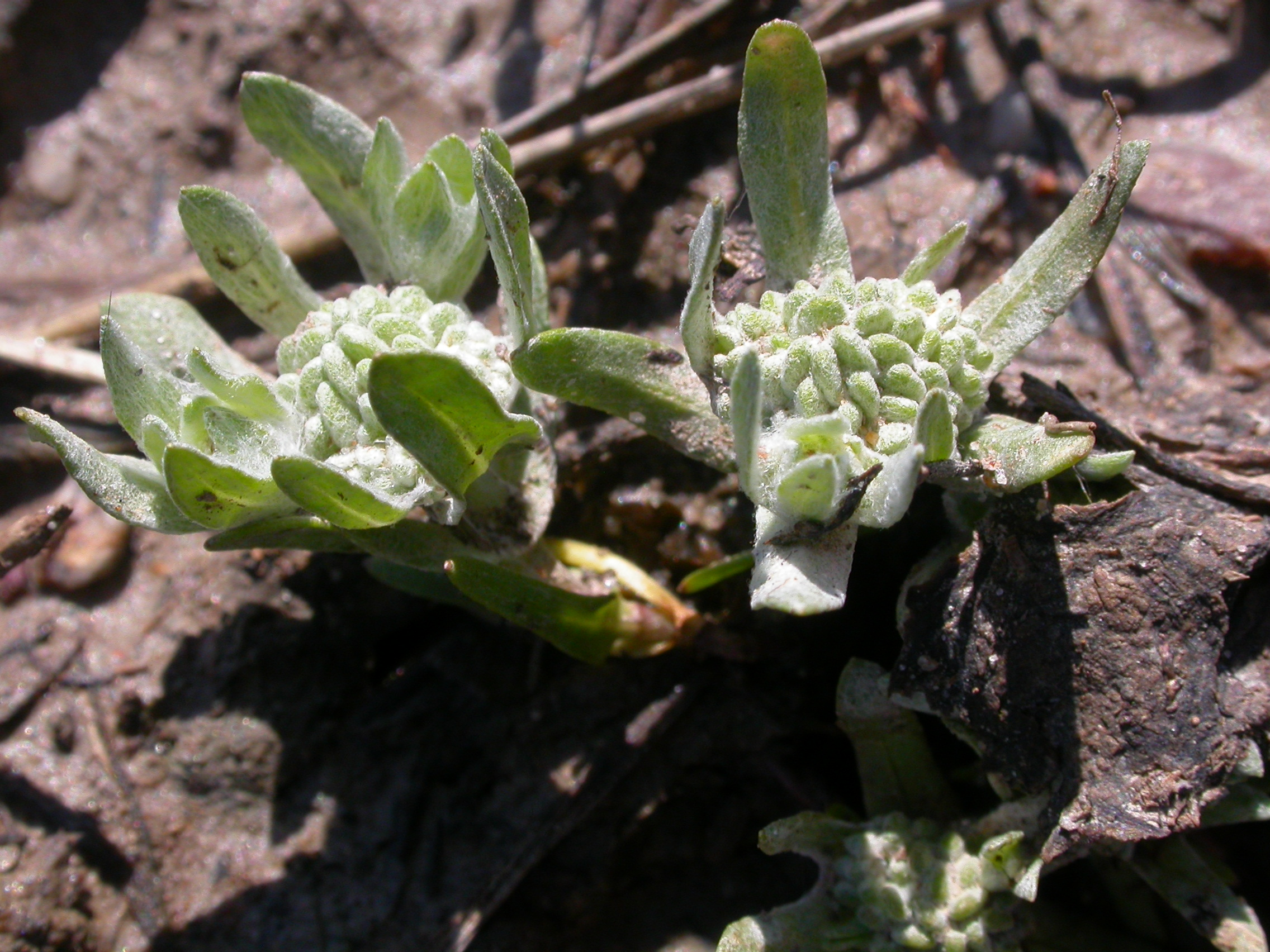

Scientific classification
- Kingdom: Plantae
- Clade: Tracheophytes
- Clade: Angiosperms
- Clade: Eudicots
- Clade: Asterids
- Order: Asterales
- Family: Asteraceae
- Genus: Psilocarphus
- Species: P. brevissimus

Binomial name
- Psilocarphus brevissimus Nutt.

= Psilocarphus brevissimus =

Species of plant

Psilocarphus brevissimus is a species of flowering plant in the family Asteraceae known by the common names short woollyheads, woolly marbles, and woolly heads.

The plant is native to western North America — from southwestern Canada, through California, to northwestern Mexico, as well as in southern South America. It grows in moist flats such as vernal pools, wetlands, and similar areas. It is found from sea level to 8,202 feet (2,500 m).

== Description ==
Psilocarphus brevissimus is a small, woolly annual herb growing just a few centimeters tall with a branching stem or multiple stems. The small, gray-green leaves are erect, pointing up parallel to the stem and sometimes appressed to it.

The inflorescence is a small, spherical flower head which is a cluster of several tiny woolly disc flowers surrounded by leaflike bracts but no phyllaries. Each tiny flower is covered in a scale which is densely woolly with long white fibers, making the developing head appear cottony.

=== Varieties ===
There are two varieties of Psilocarphus brevissimus:

- Psilocarphus brevissimus var. brevissimus — formerly Psilocarphus globiferus
- Psilocarphus brevissimus var. multiflorus (Delta woolly marbles) — limited to the Sacramento – San Joaquin River Delta and surrounding parts of the Central Valley of California. This is an uncommon plant associated with vernal pools.
