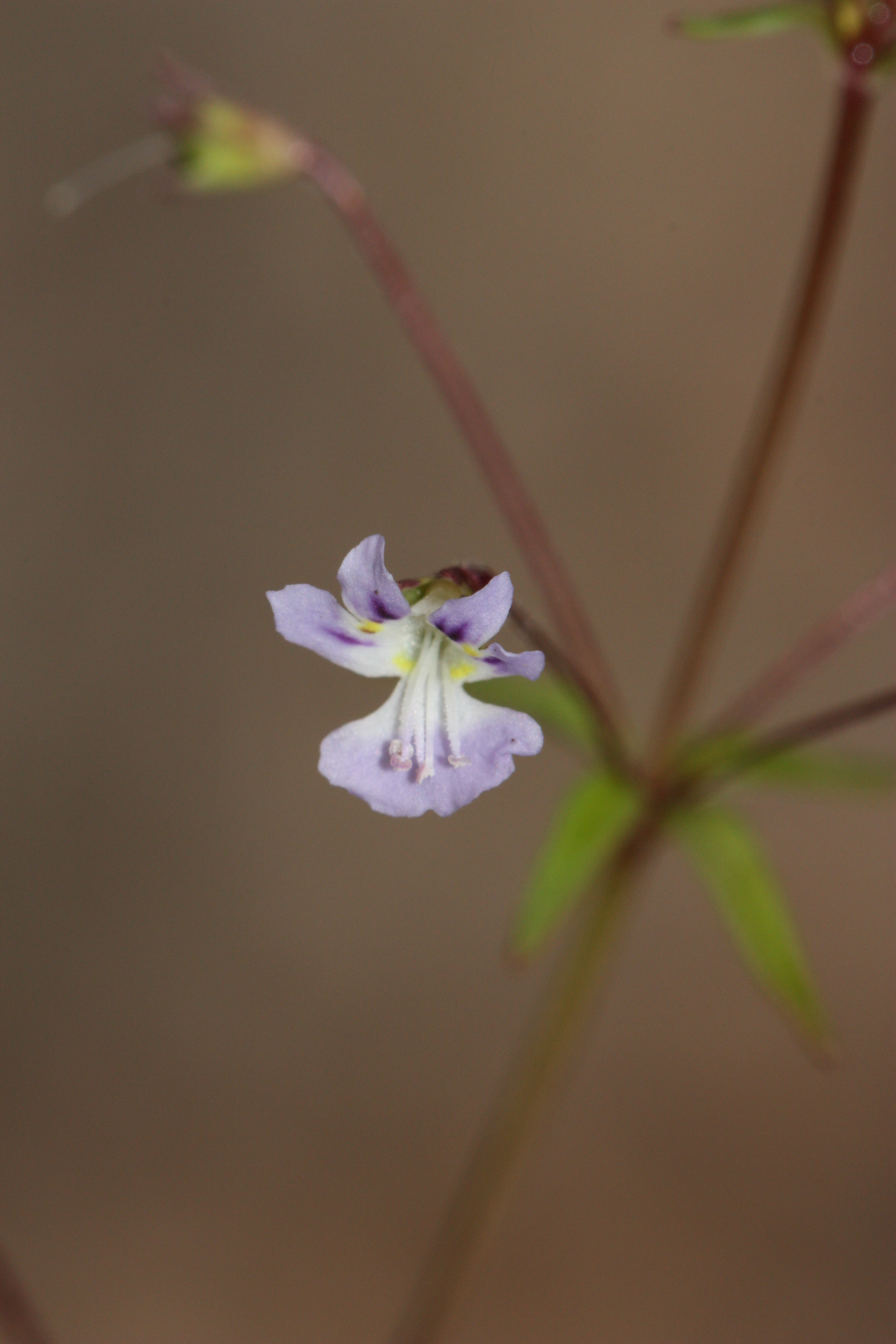
- Tonella tenella in Olympic National Park, United States

Scientific classification
- Kingdom: Plantae
- Clade: Tracheophytes
- Clade: Angiosperms
- Clade: Eudicots
- Clade: Asterids
- Order: Lamiales
- Family: Plantaginaceae
- Genus: Tonella
- Species: T. tenella

Binomial name
- Tonella tenella (Benth.) A. Heller

= Tonella tenella =

Species of flowering plant

Tonella tenella is one of two herbaceous plant species in genus Tonella, which has been recently reclassified as a member of the family Plantaginaceae. This species is known by the common names lesser baby innocence and small-flowered tonella. The plant is a small annual herb with an erect stem up to 30 centimeters tall. The flowers are very tiny, only a few millimeters wide. The corolla is arranged with four petal lobes on one side and one larger petal lobe on the other. The lobed petals are white with blue or purple spots or streaks, and they surround four white stamens. Growing in the forest understory, often scrub oak, on moist rocky soil, its range extends from southern Vancouver Island, British Columbia to San Benito County, California.
