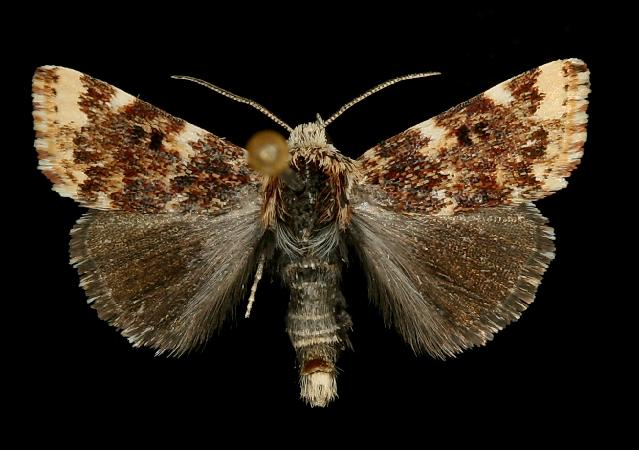

Scientific classification
- Kingdom: Animalia
- Phylum: Arthropoda
- Class: Insecta
- Order: Lepidoptera
- Superfamily: Noctuoidea
- Family: Noctuidae
- Genus: Schinia
- Species: S. avemensis

Binomial name
- Schinia avemensis Dyar, 1904

= Schinia avemensis =

Species of moth

Schinia avemensis, the gold-edged gem, is a moth of the family Noctuidae. The species was first described by Harrison Gray Dyar Jr. in 1904.

The wingspan is 16–18 mm. Adults are on wing from July to August depending on the location.

The larvae feed on Helianthus petiolaris.
