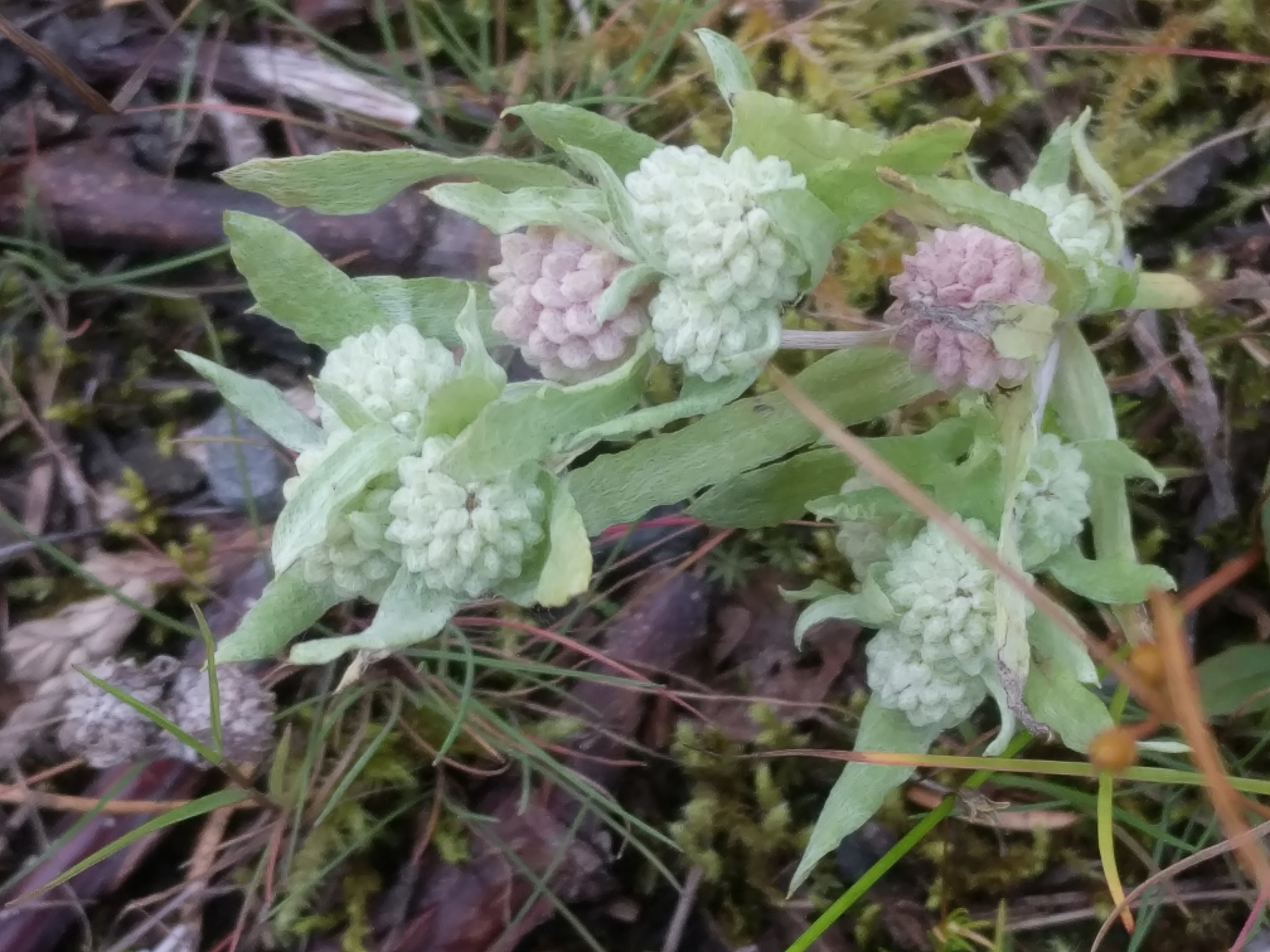

Scientific classification
- Kingdom: Plantae
- Clade: Tracheophytes
- Clade: Angiosperms
- Clade: Eudicots
- Clade: Asterids
- Order: Asterales
- Family: Asteraceae
- Genus: Psilocarphus
- Species: P. elatior

Binomial name
- Psilocarphus elatior A.Gray

= Psilocarphus elatior =

Species of plant

Psilocarphus elatior is a species of flowering plant in the family Asteraceae known by the common names tall woollyheads, meadow woollyheads and tall woolly-marbles. It is native to the Pacific Northwest in western North America from Vancouver Island, where it is known from just a few occurrences, to northern California. It grows in seasonally moist spots such as meadows, spring seeps, and vernal pools.

This is a small erect annual herb growing up to about 15 centimeters tall with a pale silvery or gray-green branching stem coated in woolly or cobwebby fibers. The leaves are linear or lance-shaped and up to about 3.5 centimeters long. They are located along the stem and there are no basal leaves.

The inflorescence is a small, spherical flower head less than a centimeter wide located at the tip of the stem or in a leaf axils. It is a cluster of several tiny woolly disc flowers surrounded by leaflike bracts but no phyllaries. Each tiny flower is covered in a scale which is densely woolly with long white fibers, making the developing head appear cottony.
