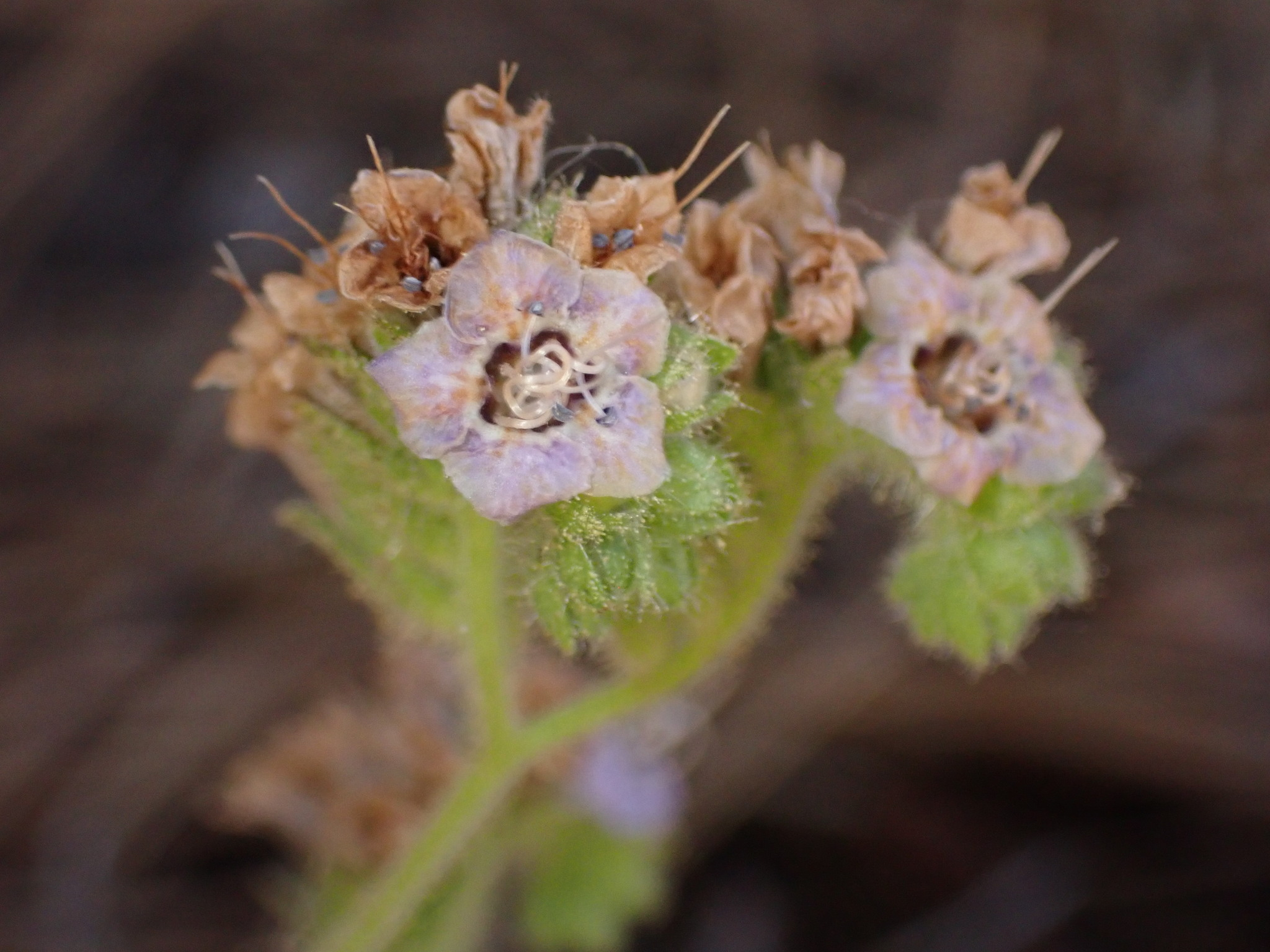

Scientific classification
- Kingdom: Plantae
- Clade: Tracheophytes
- Clade: Angiosperms
- Clade: Eudicots
- Clade: Asterids
- Order: Boraginales
- Family: Hydrophyllaceae
- Genus: Phacelia
- Species: P. ramosissima

Binomial name
- Phacelia ramosissima Douglas ex Lehm.

= Phacelia ramosissima =

Species of plant

Phacelia ramosissima is a species of flowering plant in the family Hydrophyllaceae. It is known by the common name branching phacelia. It is native to western North America from British Columbia to California and the Southwestern United States, where it can be found in many types of habitat.

It is variable in appearance, and there are many intergrading varieties. In general it is a spreading or sprawling prostrate or upright perennial herb which may approach 1.5 meters (4.5 feet) in stem length. It is branched, hairless to densely hairy, and sometimes glandular. The leaves are 4 to 20 centimeters long and most are divided into several toothed or lobed leaflets. The inflorescence is a one-sided curving or coiling cyme of funnel- or bell-shaped flowers. Each flower is under a centimeter long and white to lavender in color with protruding stamens.
