= Species at Risk Act =

Canadian federal legislation regarding endangered species

Parliament of Canada
- Long title: An Act respecting the protection of wildlife species at risk in Canada
- Citation: S.C. 2002, c. 29
- Considered by: House of Commons of Canada
- Considered by: Senate of Canada
- Royal assent: December 12, 2002

Legislative history

Initiating chamber: House of Commons of Canada
- Introduced by: David Anderson MP, Minister of the Environment
- First reading: October 9, 2002
- Second reading: October 9, 2002
- Third reading: October 9, 2002

Revising chamber: Senate of Canada
- Member(s) in charge: Tommy Banks
- First reading: October 10, 2002
- Second reading: October 22, 2002
- Third reading: December 12, 2002
- Status: Current legislation

All status categories identified by COSEWIC. Under SARA, species or DUs can be listed as XT, E, T, or SC.

The Species at Risk Act (French: Loi sur les espèces en péril, SARA) is a piece of Canadian federal legislation which became law in Canada on December 12, 2002. It is designed to meet one of Canada's key commitments under the International Convention on Biological Diversity. The goal of the Act is to prevent wildlife species in Canada from disappearing by protecting endangered or threatened organisms and their habitats. It also manages species which are not yet threatened, but whose existence or habitat is in jeopardy.

SARA defines a method to determine the steps that need to be taken in order to help protect existing relatively healthy environments, as well as recover threatened habitats, although timing and implementation of recovery plans have limitations. It identifies ways in which governments, organizations, and individuals can work together to preserve species at risk and establishes penalties for failure to obey the law.

The Act designates COSEWIC, an independent committee of wildlife experts and scientists, to identify threatened species and assess their conservation status. COSEWIC then issues a report to the government, and the Minister of the Environment evaluates the committee's recommendations when considering whether to add a species to the Schedule 1, which is the official List of Wildlife Species at Risk, or change its status. The Minister will give the list of wildlife species at Risk to the governor in council and will take advice from the Cabinet. The Cabinet is in charge of taking the list of species into account.

If a species is listed as extirpated, endangered, or threatened, SARA requires that a Recovery Strategy be prepared by the federal government, in consultation with the relevant provinces and territories, wildlife management boards, and Indigenous organizations. The Recovery Strategy describes the major threats to the species and its habitat, identifies population objectives, and in broad terms, states what will need to be done to stop or reverse the species declines. Proposed Recovery Strategies are posted on the Species at Risk Public Registry, after which public comments are accepted, generally for 60 days. 30 days after the end of the public comment period, the recovery strategy must be finalized.

== Notable conflicts ==
In July 2016, the Government of Canada issued an emergency order to stop the development of a 2 km^{2} area on the South Shore (Montreal), Quebec to protect the Western Chorus Frog, which by 2009 had seen a 90% decrease in its historical range. This action was opposed by the Government of Quebec, who perceived it as an overstepping of provincial jurisdiction.

The emergency order stopped the development of 171 new residences that had been approved by the local municipalities and by the Ministry of Sustainable Development, Environment and Parks (Quebec). 1000 residences are still permitted to be constructed. The original approved plan included 35.5 hectares to be retained for Western Chorus Frog habitat and breeding ponds and for a conservation area. 87 hectares will now be set aside.

On March 31, 2022 the government of Canada had decided to revamp the Species at risk act by removing outdated amendments. Bill S-6 will add modernization to the amendments of 29 status which include the species at risk act.

== See also ==
- List of Wildlife Species at Risk (Canada)
