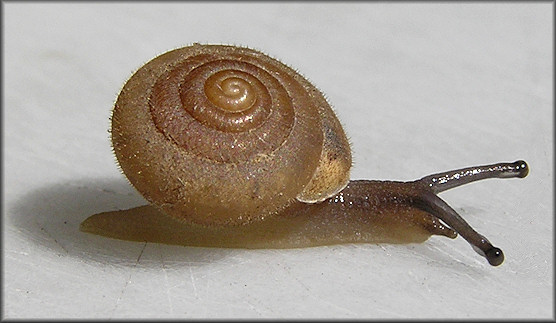
- An inland slitmouth found in Bullitt County, Kentucky

Conservation status
- Secure (NatureServe)

Scientific classification
- Kingdom: Animalia
- Phylum: Mollusca
- Class: Gastropoda
- Order: Stylommatophora
- Family: Polygyridae
- Genus: Stenotrema
- Species: S. stenotrema

Binomial name
- Stenotrema stenotrema (L. Pfeiffer, 1842)

Synonyms
- Helix stenotrema L. Pfeiffer, 1842 (unaccepted); Polygyra stenotrema L. Pfeiffer, 1842 (unaccepted); Stenotrema convexa Rafinesque, 1819 (nomen nudum)

= Stenotrema stenotrema =

Species of land snail

Stenotrema stenotrema, also known as the inland slitmouth, is a species of pulmonate land snail in the family Polygridae.

== Physical appearance ==
Inland slitmouths possess medium-sized, depressed globose shells, ranging from reddish-brown to light brown in color. It is strongly rounded, with little evidence of a keel and a low, cone-shaped spire. There are 5 to 6 whorls. Like other members of the Stenotrema genus, the shell's surface is covered in fine, short hairs. The aperture is narrow and transverse, with a defined, curved parietal tooth and notched basal lip. Inland slitmouths tend to range from 7.5-11.0 mm (0.3-0.43 in) in width and 5.5-8.0 mm (0.22-0.32 in) in height.

The inland slitmouth is most visually similar to Stenotrema hirsutum and Stenotrema brevipila.

== Ecology ==
The inland slitmouth has one of the largest ranges of any Stenotrema species, spanning from Texas in the west to Virginia in the east, and from Louisiana in the south to Illinois to the north. It is only ranked in six states, being listed as vulnerable in Illinois and Missouri, apparently secure in Virginia, and secure in Kentucky, Tennessee, and North Carolina. It is globally listed as secure.

Inland siltmouths are found in a variety of different habitats, such as forests, bluffs, ravines, pastures, roadsides, and clearings. However, they are most commonly found in leaf litter along wooded hillsides in lower elevation mixed hardwood forests. They have frequently been recorded in national forests, wilderness areas, and other protected lands such as Land Between the Lakes, Sipsey Wilderness Area, and Bankhead National Forest. The species has also been found in caves throughout Franklin, Marion, Pickett, and Van Buren counties in Tennessee.
