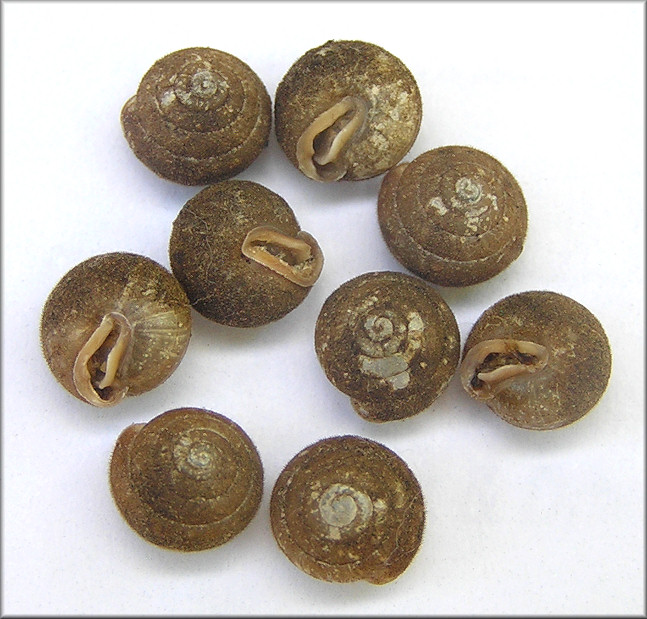
- Cohutta slitmouth shells collected in Polk County, TN

Conservation status
- Imperiled (NatureServe)

Scientific classification
- Kingdom: Animalia
- Phylum: Mollusca
- Class: Gastropoda
- Order: Stylommatophora
- Family: Polygyridae
- Genus: Stenotrema
- Species: S. cohuttense

Binomial name
- Stenotrema cohuttense (G.H. Clapp, 1914)

Synonyms
- Polygyra (Stenotrema) cohuttensis G. H. Clapp, 1907 (original combination)

= Stenotrema cohuttense =

Species of land snail

Stenotrema cohuttense, also known as the Cohutta slitmouth, is a rare, range-restricted species of pulmonate land snail in the family Polygyridae. The species is named after the Cohutta Mountains in Georgia.

== Physical appearance ==
The shell of the Cohutta slitmouth has 5 whorls and ranges from 6–8 mm (0.24–0.31 in) in diameter and 4–5 mm (0.16–0.20 in) in height. Its shell is imperforate and thin, reddish-brown, and densely covered in fine, short hairs typical of species in the Stenotrema genus. The shell has a convex base with an impressed umbilicus. The aperture of the shell is narrow, raised, and transverse with a large, hooked parietal tooth. It is most visually similar to Stenotrema brevipila.

== Ecology ==
The Cohutta slitmouth is endemic to the southeastern United States, where it is found in Polk County in southeastern Tennessee and Murray, Gilmer, and Fannin Counties in northern Georgia. It is listed as imperiled both globally and at the Tennessee state level. It is unranked in Georgia. The species' range is currently estimated to be 1,068 square kilometres (412 mi^{2}); however, this estimation is likely conservative due to the limited number of observances.

Cohutta slitmouths are commonly found in leaf litter in mixed hardwood forests along ravines, hillsides, and limestone outcroppings.

== Threats ==
Due to its limited range and habitat removal in Tennessee and Georgia, the Cohutta slitmouth is very likely in decline. Historic and current logging, mining, and development have likely reduced the amount of potential and current habitat for this species by removing trees and outcrops that the snails rely on for cover, food, and shade. This decline will likely only be further exacerbated by climate change increasing the frequency of droughts and heatwaves that desiccate and kill snails.

However, many key populations have been found in managed and protected areas such as the Cherokee National Forest and Fort Mountain State Park, and further protected areas should be searched for the species in order to establish further protections and prevent habitat loss.
