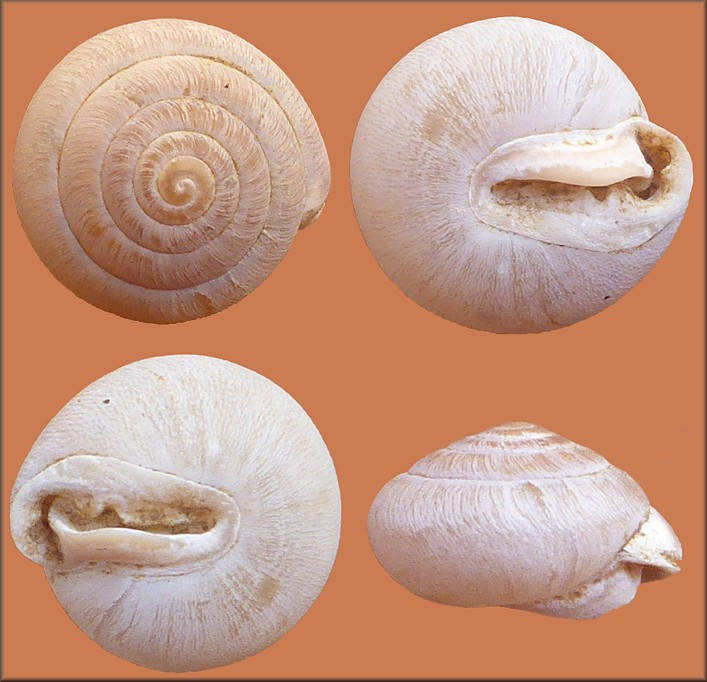
- Monte Sano slitmouth collected in Marshall County, Alabama

Conservation status
- Vulnerable (NatureServe)

Scientific classification
- Kingdom: Animalia
- Phylum: Mollusca
- Class: Gastropoda
- Order: Stylommatophora
- Family: Polygyridae
- Genus: Stenotrema
- Species: S. deceptum

Binomial name
- Stenotrema deceptum (G.H. Clapp, 1905)

Synonyms
- Polygyra (Stenotrema) decepta G. H. Clapp, 1905 (original combination)

= Stenotrema deceptum =

Species of land snail

Stenotrema deceptum, also known as the Monte Sano slitmouth, is a rare, range-restricted species of pulmonate land snail in the family Polygyridae. The species is named after Monte Sano Mountain in Alabama.

== Physical appearance ==
The Monte Sano slitmouth is most visually similar to Stenotrema hirsutum, and was originally believed to be a subspecies. It is very close in color to S. hirsutum and has hairs of a similar length and density. However, the Monte Sano slitmouth is smaller, its shell is more rounded along the top, and it possesses a broader lip with a wider, hooked parietal tooth that curves into the aperture.

This species ranges from 5–6 mm (0.20–0.24 in) in diameter and 4–5 mm (0.16–0.20 in) in height, and typically possesses 4-5 whorls.

== Ecology ==
The Monte Sano slitmouth is endemic to the southeastern United States, where it can be found in southern Tennessee and northern Alabama. It is listed as vulnerable due to its rarity and a lack of knowledge surrounding the species' true range and population size. It is likely in decline.

The species is a calciphile, and is commonly found on or around limestone outcroppings or in areas with lime-rich soils. They can also be found in leaf litter or on rotting logs along wooded hillsides and ravines.
