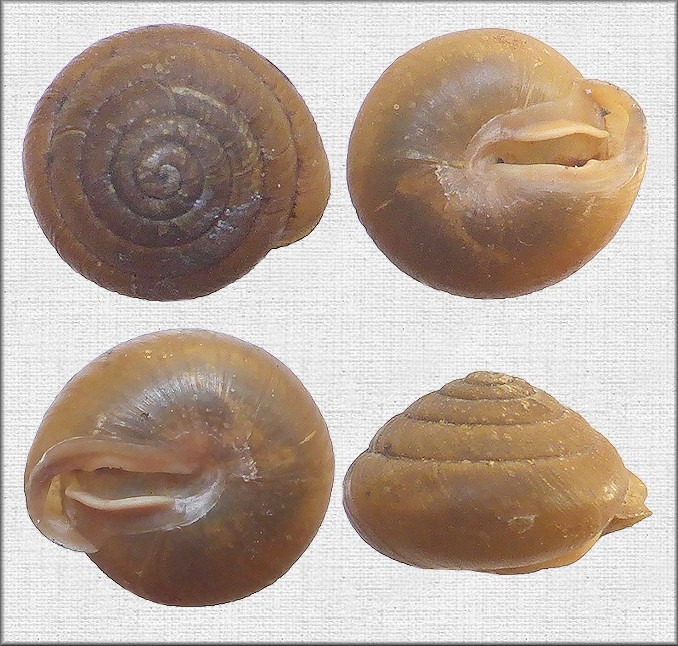
- A Great Smoky slitmouth shell collected in Sevier County, Tennessee

Conservation status
- Imperiled (NatureServe)

Scientific classification
- Kingdom: Animalia
- Phylum: Mollusca
- Class: Gastropoda
- Order: Stylommatophora
- Family: Polygyridae
- Genus: Stenotrema
- Species: S. depilatum

Binomial name
- Stenotrema depilatum (Pilsbry, 1895)

Synonyms
- Polygyra (Stenotrema) stenotrema var. depilata Pilsbry, 1895 (original combination)

= Stenotrema depilatum =

Species of land snail

Stenotrema depilatum, also known as the Great Smoky slitmouth, is a rare, range-restricted species of pulmonate land snail in the family Polygyridae.

== Physical appearance ==
The Great Smoky slitmouth possesses a globose, lightly wrinkled shell with an elevated spire, lacking the fine hairs typical of species in the Stenotrema genus. Biologist Henry Pilsbry described the base of the shell as having "the luster of silk." The parietal tooth is small, and the lip is shallow and wide.

== Ecology ==
The Great Smoky slitmouth is endemic to the southeastern United States, where it can be found in eastern-southeastern Tennessee and western North Carolina. It has been found in Sevier and Monroe Counties in Tennessee and in Graham and Swain Counties in North Carolina. Due to its rarity and a lack of knowledge surrounding population size and range, the species is listed as imperiled in both states. The majority of occurrences have been recorded in the Great Smoky Mountains National Park.

This species is most commonly found at elevations above 1,000 m (3,280.84 ft) in dense hardwood forests under wet leaf litter or moss. It is sometimes found with Stenotrema altispira.
