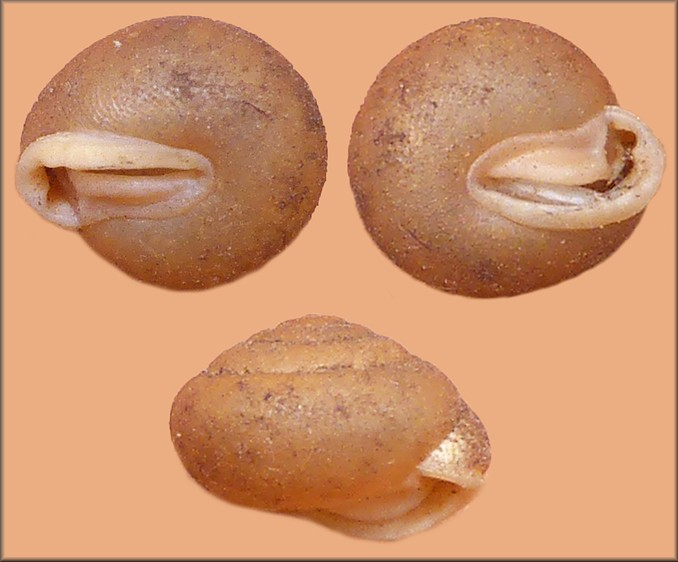
- A Ridge-lip slitmouth shell collected in Bullock County, Alabama

Conservation status
- Vulnerable (NatureServe)

Scientific classification
- Kingdom: Animalia
- Phylum: Mollusca
- Class: Gastropoda
- Order: Stylommatophora
- Family: Polygyridae
- Genus: Stenotrema
- Species: S. maxillatum

Binomial name
- Stenotrema maxillatum (Gould, 1848)

Synonyms
- Helix maxillata Gould, 1848 (unaccepted)

= Stenotrema maxillatum =

Species of land snail

Stenotrema maxillatum, also known as the ridge-lip slitmouth, is a species of pulmonate land snail in the family Polygridae.

== Physical appearance ==
Ridge-lip slitmouths possess small, globose shells, typically chestnut brown in color. The aperture is long, pale, and narrow, with a defined, protruding outer lip. The parietal tooth is hidden behind the outer lip. The ridge-lip slitmouth is most visually similar to Stenotrema hirsutum, except it is smaller and the shell is more globose.

== Ecology ==
The ridge-lip slitmouth is endemic to the southeastern United States, where it has been found in Alabama and Georgia. The species is listed as vulnerable.

This species is most commonly found in leaf litter or on rocks and logs along wooded hillsides and ravines.
