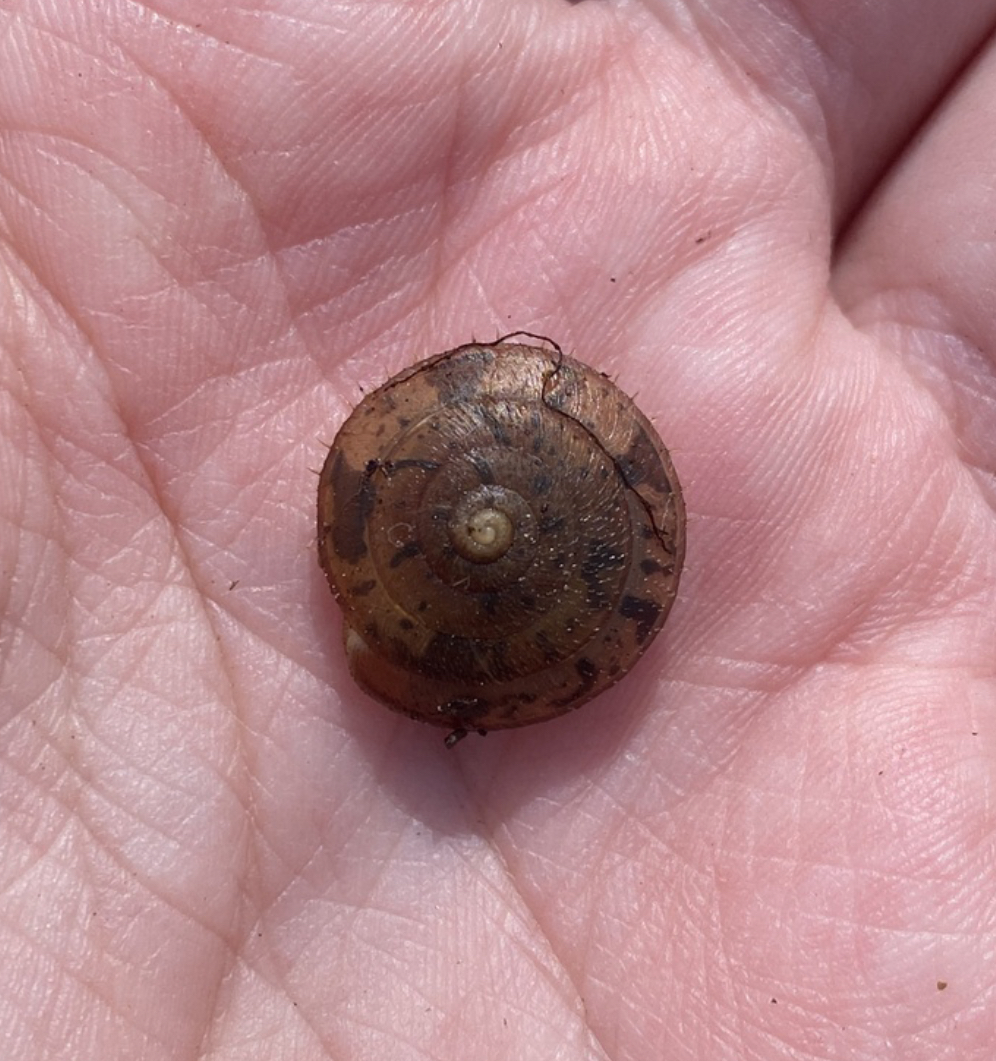
- A mature fringed slitmouth found in Tennessee

Conservation status
- Vulnerable (NatureServe)

Scientific classification
- Kingdom: Animalia
- Phylum: Mollusca
- Class: Gastropoda
- Order: Stylommatophora
- Family: Polygyridae
- Genus: Stenotrema
- Species: S. barbigerum

Binomial name
- Stenotrema barbigerum (Redfield, 1856)

Synonyms
- Helix barbigera Redfield, 1856

= Stenotrema barbigerum =

Species of land snail

Stenotrema barbigerum, also known as the fringed slitmouth, is a species of pulmonate land snail in the family Polygridae. The species is endemic to the southeastern United States.

== Physical appearance ==
Fringed slitmouths have domed brown shells with 5+ whorls, dark blotches, and coarse hairs characteristic of the Stenotrema genus. The aperture is narrow with a defined, pale lip.

== Ecology ==
Fringed slitmouth populations have been located in Alabama, Tennessee, Georgia, South Carolina, and North Carolina. It is listed as vulnerable both globally and in the state of Tennessee.

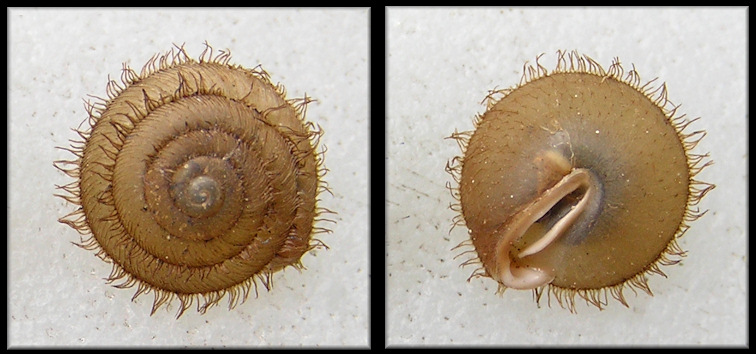
Apical and umbilical views of a fringed slitmouth individual collected in Tennessee

This species is most commonly found in mixed hardwood forest on or around rotting logs in advanced stages of decay. They may be found in ravines or along wooded hillsides. They typically live in colonies of up to 12 individuals.
