= Stenotrema simile =

Conservation status
- Imperiled (NatureServe)

Scientific classification
- Kingdom: Animalia
- Phylum: Mollusca
- Class: Gastropoda
- Order: Stylommatophora
- Family: Polygyridae
- Genus: Stenotrema
- Species: S. simile

Binomial name
- Stenotrema simile (Grimm, 1971)

Synonyms
- Stenotrema (Toxotrema) simile Grimm, 1971 (alternative representation)

Species of land snail

Stenotrema simile, also known as the Bear Creek slitmouth, is a rare, range-restricted species of pulmonate land snail in the family Polygridae. It is named after Bear Creek in western Maryland.

== Physical appearance ==
The shell of the Bear Creek slitmouth is thin, subglobose, with a low spire, ranging from a light cinnamon brown to an olive buff. It may be subtranslucent or opaque. The shell is covered with long, stiff, curved hairs typical of species in the Stenotrema genus. The periphery is rounded and the base of the shell is convex. The aperture is narrow with a long, slender parietal tooth that curves towards the outer lip tooth. The basal lip is fairly wide, with a deep notch in the center and a large, knobby tooth on its periphery. The species averages 9.3 mm (0.37 in) in diameter and 6.7 mm (0.26 in) in height.

== Ecology ==
The Bear Creek slitmouth is endemic to the eastern United States, specifically the Appalachian Mountains, where it is found in West Virginia and Maryland. The species has been found throughout eastern and northern West Virginia in Pocahontas, Webster, Nicholas, Randolph, Hancock, Brooke, and Monongalia Counties. The species is limited to the western edge of Maryland, where it has been found in Garrett County. Due to the lack of active studies or searches the species is likely underreported in the state. It is also possible that populations of the Bear Creek slitmouth could be found in southern Pennsylvania and eastern Ohio due to the availability of favored habitat.

Bear Creek slitmouths can be found under or on logs, leaf litter, or rocks along cool, moist wooded hillsides, usually in higher elevations. Grimm specifically noted that the species could be found along damp, maple-dominated hillsides and on or around sandstone talus. They also appear to favor shale and limestone. In West Virginia, the West Virginia Natural Heritage Program documented the species most commonly in forests with sugar maple, white oak, red maple, American beech, black locust, American elm, yellow birch, redbud, basswood, and ash trees.

The species is listed as imperiled both globally and at the West Virginia state level due to its rarity, small range, and a general lack of knowledge.

== Threats ==
The greatest threats to the Bear Creek slitmouth are drought, fire, and deforestation. While some of the species' range is within the Monongahela National Forest, the remainder is in areas subject to logging, which removes the habitat necessary for the species' survival. Climate change has the possibility to exacerbate droughts that desiccate snails and lead to fires that destroy habitat. Since the snail prefers rocky habitat, it may also be threatened by mining, specifically for limestone and sandstone.
