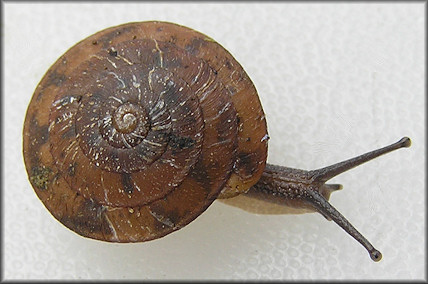
- A mature carinate slitmouth

Conservation status
- Apparently Secure (NatureServe)

Scientific classification
- Kingdom: Animalia
- Phylum: Mollusca
- Class: Gastropoda
- Order: Stylommatophora
- Family: Polygyridae
- Genus: Stenotrema
- Species: S. spinosum

Binomial name
- Stenotrema spinosum (I. Lea, 1830)

Synonyms
- Carocolla spinosa I. Lea, 1831 (unnacepted); Helix spinosa I. Lea, 1831 (unnacepted)

= Stenotrema spinosum =

Species of land snail

Stenotrema spinosum, also known as the carinate slitmouth, is a species of pulmonate land snail in the family Polygridae.

== Physical appearance ==
The carinate slitmouth possesses a thin, lens-shaped shell with a sharp, angular periphery covered in tiny spines. The shell may range from a light chestnut brown to a dark brown, and is covered by dark, irregular splotches. The shell has 5-6 whorls, and the outside whorl may be slightly transparent. The spire is nearly even with the rest of the shell. The aperture is narrow with a thick outer lip and long, curved parietal tooth. The notch in the basal lip is barely perceptible.

== Ecology ==
The carinate slitmouth is native to the southeastern United States, where it can be found in Alabama, Mississippi, Tennessee, Georgia, and Virginia. The species is listed as secure globally and at the Tennessee state level.

Like a few other members of the Stenotrema genus found in the southeast, the carinate slitmouth is a limestone specialist (calciphile). It is most commonly found on or around limestone outcrops in hardwood forests, hiding in crevices or crawling on stone surfaces. They tend to hide in crevices during the day and become active in the evening or at night. They may also be found in caves, such as Big Mouth Cave in Grundy County, Tennessee, or on rotting logs.

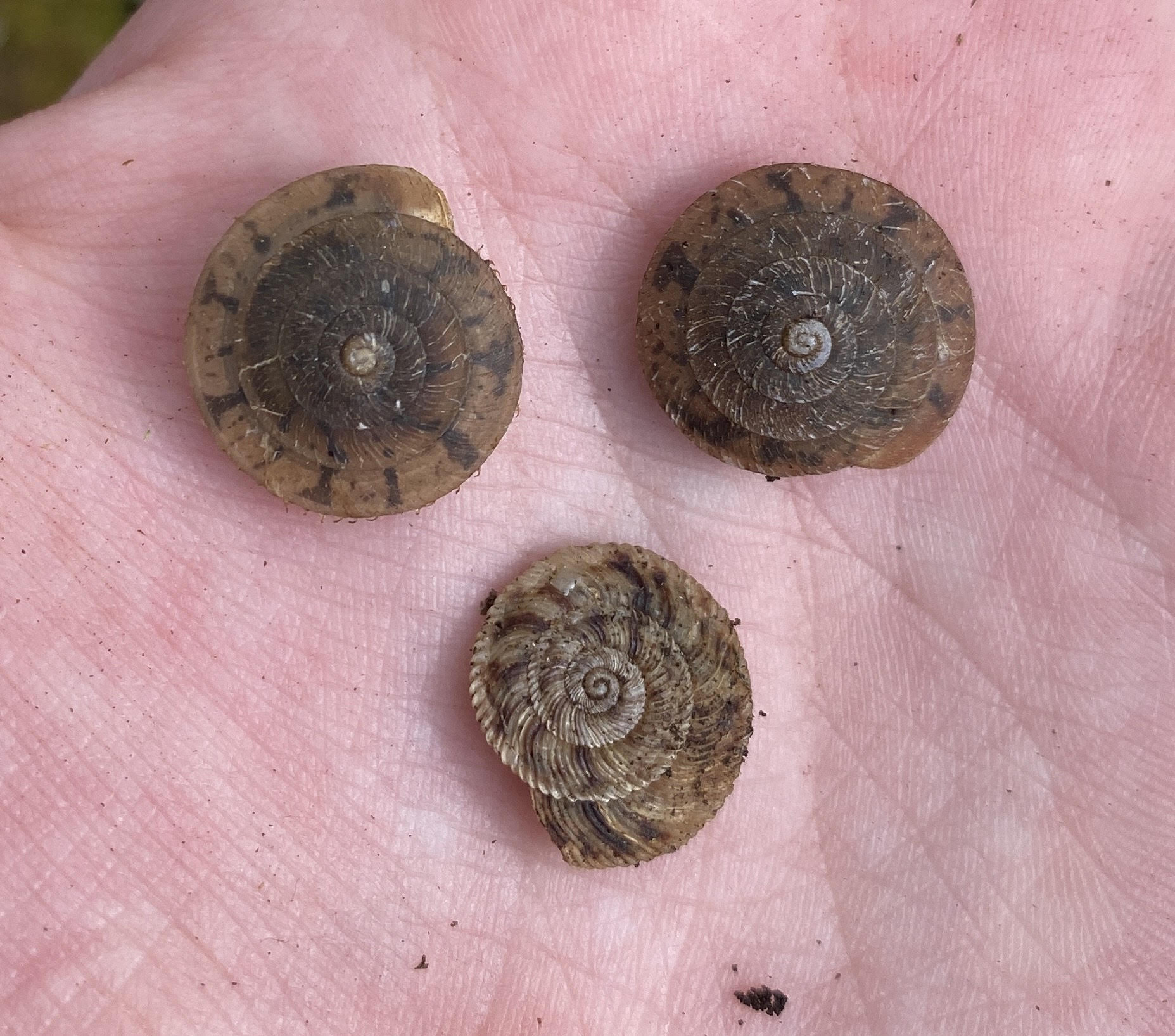
Mature Stenotrema barbigerum (upper left), Stenotrema spinosum (upper right), and Anguispira cumberlandiana (bottom) individuals found together on a limestone boulder
