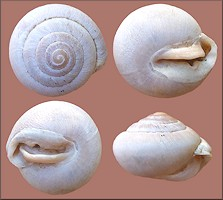
- Alabama slitmouth shell collected in Marshall County, Alabama

Conservation status
- Imperiled (NatureServe)

Scientific classification
- Kingdom: Animalia
- Phylum: Mollusca
- Class: Gastropoda
- Order: Stylommatophora
- Family: Polygyridae
- Genus: Stenotrema
- Species: S. exodon

Binomial name
- Stenotrema exodon (Pilsbry, 1900)

Synonyms
- Helix stenotrema var. globosa Sargent, 1892 (nomen nudum); Polygra stenotrema exodon Pilsbry, 1900 (original combination)

= Stenotrema exodon =

Species of land snail

Stenotrema exodon, also known as the Alabama slitmouth, is a rare species of pulmonate land snail in the family Polygyridae.

== Physical appearance ==
The Alabama slitmouth's shell is horn-brown and covered in the thin, fine hairs typical of species in the Stenotrema genus. The aperture lips are paler than the rest of the shell, protrude outwards, and possess a defined notch and short parietal tooth. The spire is elevated and the shape is globose.

== Ecology ==
The Alabama slitmouth is endemic to the southeastern United States, where it can be found in Alabama and Tennessee along the southernmost edge of the Cumberland Plateau. It is listed as imperiled globally and at the Tennessee state level. The species was first described by carcinologist Henry A. Pilsbry in the city of Woodville in Jackson County, Alabama. It has now been additionally documented in Madison, DeKalb, Marshall Counties in Alabama, and in Franklin and Marion Counties in Tennessee.

This species is a limestone specialist (calciphile), and can be found on or around limestone outcrops or between limestone boulders in forested karst environments. They are most commonly found in hardwood-dominant forest.
