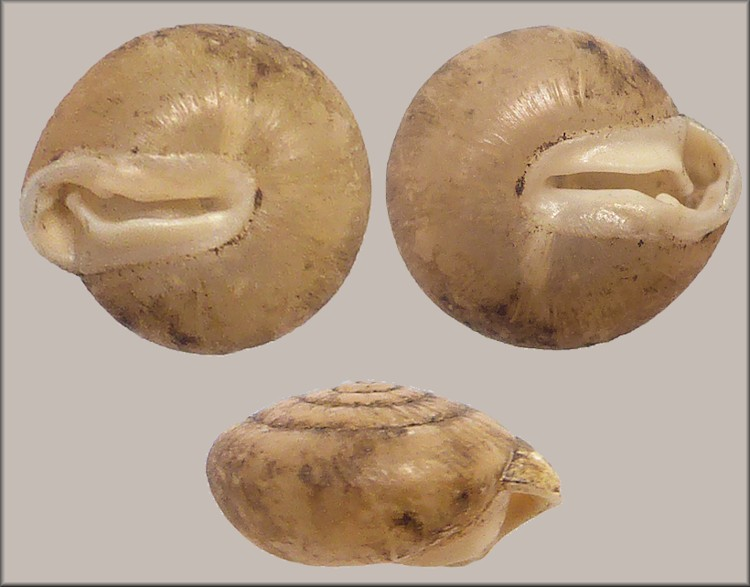
- Missouri slitmouth shell collected in Springfield, Missouri

Conservation status
- Imperiled (NatureServe)

Scientific classification
- Kingdom: Animalia
- Phylum: Mollusca
- Class: Gastropoda
- Order: Stylommatophora
- Family: Polygyridae
- Genus: Stenotrema
- Species: S. blandianum

Binomial name
- Stenotrema blandianum (Pilsbry, 1903)

Synonyms
- Polygyra blandiana (Pilsbry, 1903)

= Stenotrema blandianum =

Species of land snail

Stenotrema blandianum, also known as the Missouri slitmouth, is a species of pulmonate land snail in the family Polygridae.

== Physical appearance ==
The Missouri slitmouth possesses a glossy, striated, chestnut-brown shell without the hairs typical of species in the Stenotrema genus. The shell is imperforate and depressed with an angular periphery. The aperture is paler than the rest of the shell with an elevated lip and a defined parietal tooth.

== Ecology ==
The Missouri slitmouth is endemic to North America, with populations found only in Arkansas and Missouri. The species is listed as imperiled globally and imperiled in Missouri. The species is unranked in Arkansas.

This snail is most commonly found under and around rocks along river bluffs and ravines.
