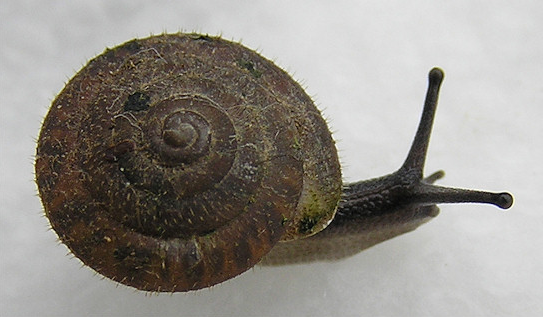
- A mature Kentucky slitmouth found in Kentucky

Conservation status
- Apparently Secure (NatureServe)

Scientific classification
- Kingdom: Animalia
- Phylum: Mollusca
- Class: Gastropoda
- Order: Stylommatophora
- Family: Polygyridae
- Genus: Stenotrema
- Species: S. angellum

Binomial name
- Stenotrema angellum (Hubricht, 1958)

= Stenotrema angellum =

Species of land snail

Stenotrema angellum, also known as the Kentucky slitmouth, is a species of pulmonate land snail in the family Polygridae.

== Physical appearance ==
The Kentucky slitmouth possesses an irregularly striate, lens-shaped, conoid shell with 5 to 5.5 whorls and a convex base. The shell's periphery is bluntly angular along the front, but gradually becomes more rounded behind the lip. The shell can range from cameo brown to snuff brown in color, and the surface is covered in short, coarse hairs typical of species in the Stenotrema genus. The aperture is narrow with a long, brownish parietal tooth.

Mature Kentucky slitmouths tend to average around 6.23 mm (0.25 in) in height and 10.68 mm (0.42 in) in diameter.

== Ecology ==
Malacologist Leslie Hubricht originally described the species in Indiana, Kentucky, and Tennessee. The species is listed as secure in Kentucky and vulnerable in Tennessee.

Kentucky slitmouth populations are concentrated across Kentucky, with populations along the southern border of Indiana and north-central border of Tennessee being at the very edges of the species' range. The snail is only found in Jefferson, Clark, Harrison, and Crawford Counties in Indiana, and Clay, Fentress, Pickett, and Jackson Counties in Tennessee. The populations found in Fentress and Pickett Counties were located in Skillmans Mark Cave and Bunkham Cave respectively.

This species is most commonly found in mixed hardwood forests along wooded hillsides or ravines. They can be found crawling in thick, wet to damp leaf litter or under rotting logs. They may also be found around limestone escarpments.
