= Rich Mountain Slitmouth =

Conservation status
- Data Deficient (IUCN 2.3)

- Imperiled (NatureServe)

Scientific classification
- Kingdom: Animalia
- Phylum: Mollusca
- Class: Gastropoda
- Order: Stylommatophora
- Family: Polygyridae
- Genus: Stenotrema
- Species: S. pilsbryi

Binomial name
- Stenotrema pilsbryi (Ferriss, 1900)

Species of gastropod

Rich Mountain slitmouth or Pilsbry's narrow-apertured land snail, scientific name Stenotrema pilsbryi, is a species of air-breathing land snail, a terrestrial pulmonate gastropod mollusc in the family Polygyridae. This species is endemic to Ouachita Mountains of the United States.

== Description ==
The Rich Mountain slitmouth occurs in a very small range in southeast Oklahoma and southwest Arkansas. Its appearance is atypical, as it has protrusions which cover the shell. These protrusions have the effect of making the snail look hairy. The species was first described on the Arkansas side of Rich Mountain as Polygyra pilsbryi.

== Distribution and habitat ==
The distribution of the Rich Mountain Slitmouth is very limited, only occurring on parts of three mountains in Oklahoma and Arkansas. Rich Mountain is the type locality and contains the first known populations, with other populations occurring on adjacent Black Fork Mountain and the far eastern side of Winding Stair Mountain. Its range is further limited in that it only occurs on the characteristic talus rock glaciers of the Ouachitas.
