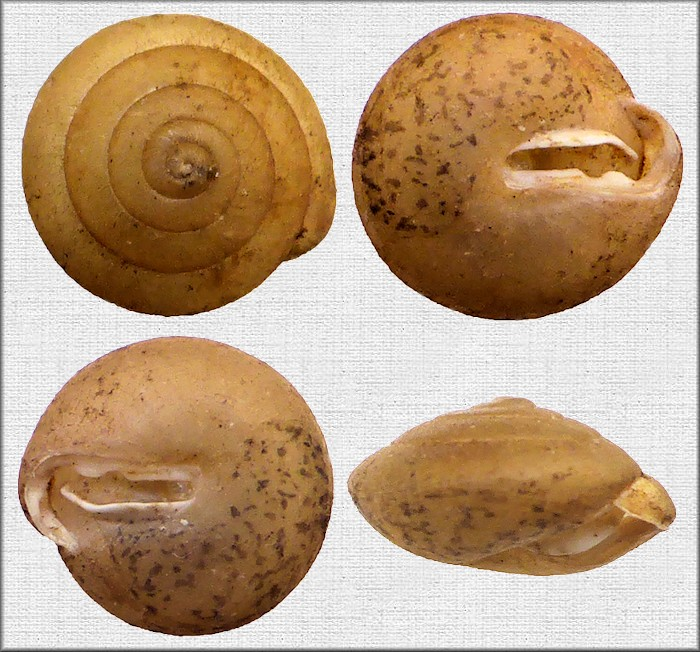
- An Ozark slitmouth shell collected in Polk County, Arkansas

Conservation status
- Vulnerable (NatureServe)

Scientific classification
- Kingdom: Animalia
- Phylum: Mollusca
- Class: Gastropoda
- Order: Stylommatophora
- Family: Polygyridae
- Genus: Stenotrema
- Species: S. labrosum

Binomial name
- Stenotrema labrosum (Bland, 1862)

Synonyms
- Helix labrosa Bland, 1862 (original combination); Polygyra labrosa Bland, 1852 (superseded combination); Stenotrema abaddona Branson, 1964 (unaccepted); Stenotrema glassi Branson, 1964 (unaccepted)

= Stenotrema labrosum =

Species of land snail

Stenotrema labrosum, also known as the Ozark slitmouth, is a species of pulmonate land snail in the family Polygridae.

== Physical appearance ==
The Ozark slitmouth's shell ranges from 10 to 12.5 mm (0.39 to 0.49 in) in diameter and averages 6.5 mm (0.26 in) in height. The base of the shell can range from a yellowish-cinnamon to a dark brown, and it is covered with the fine, thin hairs typical of species in the Stenotrema genus. The shell is imperforate and lenticular with a defined carina and convex-conoid spire. The base of the shell is softly rounded. The aperture is narrow and a linguiform tooth extends across the entirety of the parietal wall. There is a large notch in the center of the basal margin.

== Ecology ==
The Ozark slitmouth is endemic to the United States, where it has been found in Iowa, Missouri, Arkansas, Oklahoma, and Louisiana. It is listed as vulnerable globally and as imperiled in Arkansas. The species is most commonly found in leaf litter or on or under rocks and logs along moist wooded hillsides and ravines. They may also be found along well-shaded limestone, sandstone, or talus slopes.
