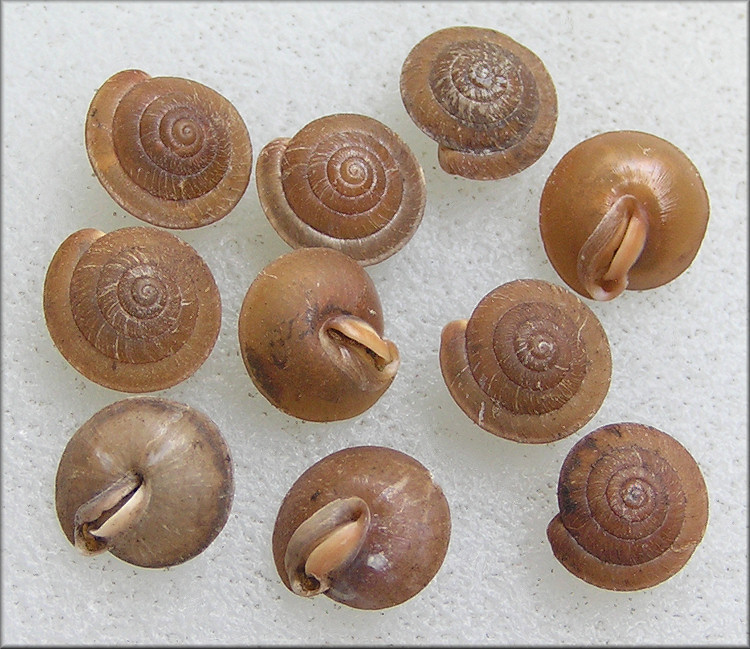
- Sequatchie slitmouth shells collected in Bledsoe County, Tennessee

Conservation status
- Imperiled (NatureServe)

Scientific classification
- Kingdom: Animalia
- Phylum: Mollusca
- Class: Gastropoda
- Order: Stylommatophora
- Family: Polygyridae
- Genus: Stenotrema
- Species: S. edgarianum

Binomial name
- Stenotrema edgarianum (I. Lea, 1841)

Synonyms
- Carocolla edgariana I. Lea, 1841 (original combination)

= Stenotrema edgarianum =

Species of land snail

Stenotrema edgarianum, also known as the Sequatchie slitmouth, is a rare, range-restricted species of pulmonate land snail in the family Polygyridae.

== Physical appearance ==
The Sequatchie slitmouth's shell is reddish-brown in color, irregularly striated, flat along the top, and convex below. The lip is thick with a narrow opening and a defined parietal tooth. The shell typically has 5 whorls.

== Ecology ==
The Sequatchie slitmouth is endemic to the Appalachian Mountains, specifically the Cumberland Plateau, where it can be found in Marion, Sequatchie, Bledsoe, and Cumberland Counties in southeastern Tennessee. Due to its rarity, the species is listed as imperiled globally and at the Tennessee state level.

This species is found on logs or in leaf litter along wooded hillsides. They are rarely found in large numbers.
