= Stenotrema calvescens =

Conservation status
- Vulnerable (NatureServe)

Scientific classification
- Kingdom: Animalia
- Phylum: Mollusca
- Class: Gastropoda
- Order: Stylommatophora
- Family: Polygyridae
- Genus: Stenotrema
- Species: S. calvescens

Binomial name
- Stenotrema calvescens (Hubricht, 1961)

Synonyms
- Helix (Stenotrema) hirsuta Say, 1817 (unaccepted combination); Helix hirsuta Say, 1817; Helix porcina Say, 1824; Polygyra (Stenotrema) hirsutum (Say, 1817) (unaccepted combination); Polygyra hirsuta (Say, 1817) (unaccepted combination); Polygyra hirsuta nana Richards, 1934 · unaccepted (nomen nudum); Polygyra hirsuta var. yarmouthensis F. C. Baker, 1927 · unaccepted; Stenotrema burringtoni Grimm, 1971

Species of gastropod

Stenotrema calvescens, common name Chattanooga slitmouth, is a species of air-breathing land snail, a terrestrial pulmonate gastropod mollusc in the subfamily Triodopsinae of the family Polygyridae.
