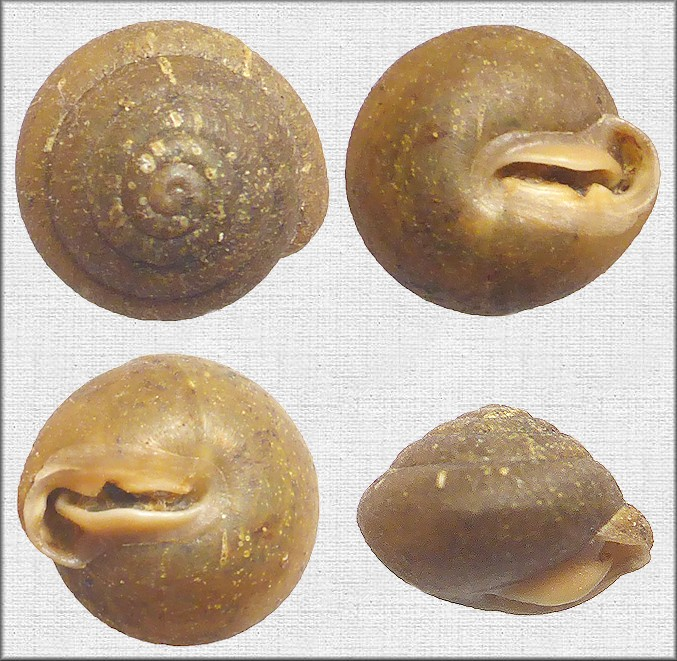
- An Appalachian slitmouth shell collected in Vogel State Park in Union County, Georgia

Conservation status
- Apparently Secure (NatureServe)

Scientific classification
- Kingdom: Animalia
- Phylum: Mollusca
- Class: Gastropoda
- Order: Stylommatophora
- Family: Polygyridae
- Genus: Stenotrema
- Species: S. magnifumosum

Binomial name
- Stenotrema magnifumosum (Pilsbry, 1900)

Synonyms
- Polygra edvardsi magnifumosa Pilsbry, 1900 (original combination)

= Stenotrema magnifumosum =

Species of land snail

Stenotrema magnifumosum, also known as the Appalachian slitmouth, is a species of pulmonate land snail in the family Polygridae.

== Physical appearance ==
The Appalachian slitmouth possesses a small, striated, dark brown shell often covered in yellowish streaks or flecks. The upper surface of the shell is covered in fine, short hairs common amongst members of the Stenotrema genus. The bottom of the shell is smooth and rounded. The aperture is pale, narrow, and defined by a large parietal tooth (lamella) that curves downwards on both ends. There is a large notch in the basal lip.

Appalachian slitmouths average 5 mm (0.2 in) in diameter and 7.25 mm (0.29 in) in height.

== Ecology ==
The Appalachian slitmouth is endemic to the southeastern United States, where it has been found in Tennessee, North Carolina, South Carolina, Georgia, and Alabama. It is listed as apparently secure at the global level, secure in North Carolina, and vulnerable in Tennessee.

The Appalachian slitmouth prefers dense hardwood forests along the sides of mountains or slopes, where it is most commonly found in leaf litter. They can be found at elevations anywhere between 900 and 4,500 ft (274.3–1371.6 m).
