= Stenotrema hubrichti =

Conservation status
- Data Deficient (IUCN 2.3)

Scientific classification
- Kingdom: Animalia
- Phylum: Mollusca
- Class: Gastropoda
- Order: Stylommatophora
- Family: Polygyridae
- Genus: Stenotrema
- Species: S. hubrichti

Binomial name
- Stenotrema hubrichti Pilsbry, 1940

Species of gastropod

Stenotrema hubrichti is a species of air-breathing land snail, a terrestrial pulmonate gastropod mollusc in the family Polygyridae. This species is endemic to the United States.
