= Stenotrema edvardsi =

Conservation status
- Apparently Secure (NatureServe)

Scientific classification
- Kingdom: Animalia
- Phylum: Mollusca
- Class: Gastropoda
- Order: Stylommatophora
- Family: Polygyridae
- Genus: Stenotrema
- Species: S. edvardsi

Binomial name
- Stenotrema edvardsi (Bland, 1856)

Synonyms
- Helix edvardsi Bland, 1856 (original combination); Polygra edvardsi Bland, 1856 (superseded combination)

Species of land snail

Stenotrema edvardsi, also known as the Ridge-and-valley slitmouth, is a species of pulmonate land snail in the family Polygyridae.

Conchologist Thomas B. Bland named the species after his friend, W.H. Edwards, who collected the shell and brought it to Bland's attention.

== Physical appearance ==
Ridge-and-valley slitmouths tend to range from 7–8 mm (0.28–0.31 in) in diameter and 4.5–5 mm (0.18–0.20 in) in height. The shell is lens-shaped, chestnut-colored, and covered in small, hair-like radial ridges. There are short, bristle-like hairs along the periphery. The top of the shell is conoid with an elevated, but somewhat, flat spire, and the base is convex. The aperture is transverse and narrow with a long parietal tooth that does not project past the basal lip.

== Ecology ==
The Ridge-and-valley slitmouth is endemic to the Appalachian Mountains in the eastern United States, where it can be found in Kentucky, West Virginia, Virginia, Tennessee, and Alabama. Biologist Henry A. Pilsbry also cites it in Georgia and Pennsylvania. It is listed as globally secure, but as vulnerable in Virginia and West Virginia. It is unlisted in Alabama.

This species is most commonly found in mixed hardwood forests along rocky hillsides or ravines, on logs or in leaf litter. It is very common in hemlock-dominated forest.
