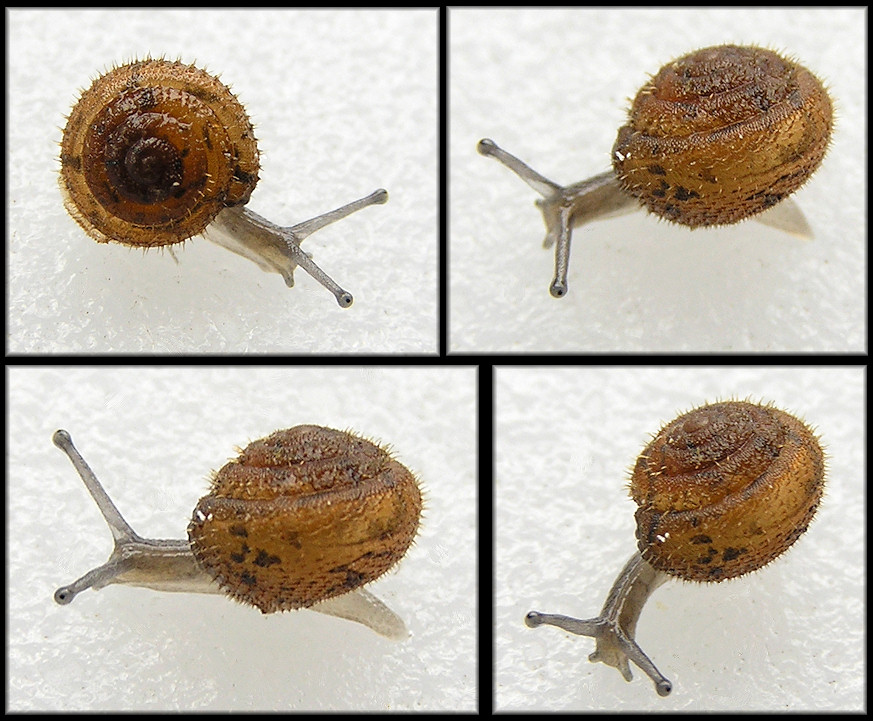
- A juvenile pygmy slitmouth found in Henderson County, North Carolina

Conservation status
- Vulnerable (NatureServe)

Scientific classification
- Kingdom: Animalia
- Phylum: Mollusca
- Class: Gastropoda
- Order: Stylommatophora
- Family: Polygyridae
- Genus: Stenotrema
- Species: S. pilula

Binomial name
- Stenotrema pilula (Pilsbry, 1900)

Synonyms
- Polygra hirsuta var. pilula Pilsbry, 1900 (unaccepted)

= Stenotrema pilula =

Species of land snail

Stenotrema pilula, also known as the pygmy slitmouth, is a species of pulmonate land snail in the family Polygridae.

== Physical appearance ==
The shells of pygmy slitmouths are smaller than the majority of Stenotrema species, with an elevated spire and 5 or more whorls. The surface of the shell is covered by the fine, long hairs typical of species of the Stenotrema genus. The parietal tooth is long and hooked, and curves inwards into the interdenticular sinus. There is a large notch in the basal lip. The shell is commonly chestnut brown in color.

Pygmy slitmouths range from 5.5 to 5.6 mm (0.22 to 0.22 in) in width and 4–5 mm (0.16–0.20 in) in height.

== Ecology ==
The pygmy slitmouth is endemic to the southeastern Appalachian Mountains, where it has been found in Tennessee, North Carolina, and South Carolina. NatureServe claims the species has been found in Virginia, but there are no historical records of its existence in the state. The species is listed as vulnerable globally and at the Tennessee and North Carolina state levels.

Pygmy slitmouths are most commonly found in leaf litter or under logs along the hillsides of dense hardwood forests. It appears to favor higher elevations, and is rarely found below elevations of 2,000 ft (610 m).
