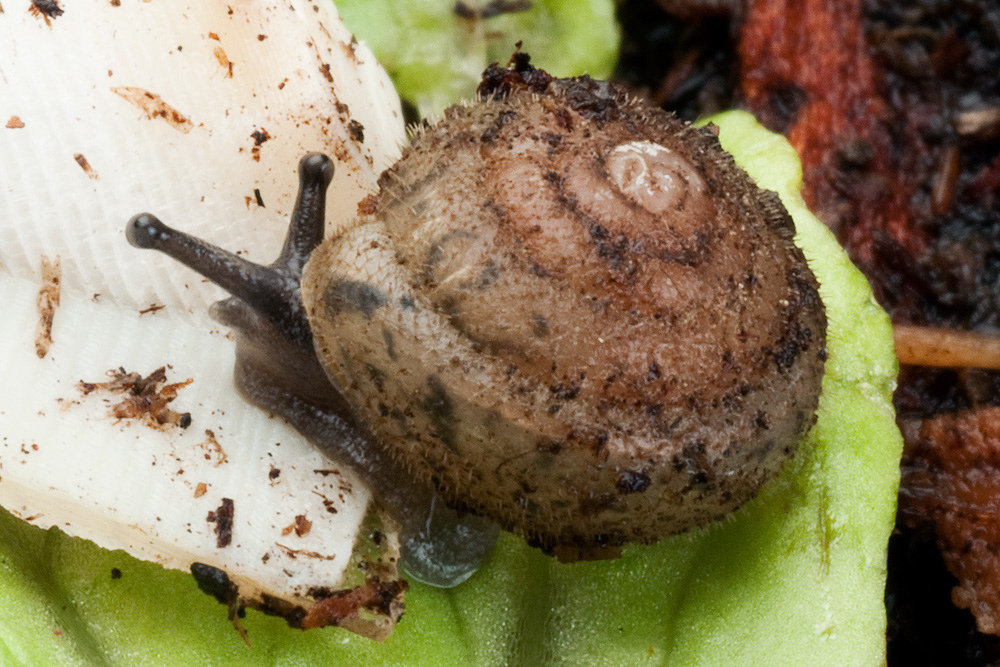
- A live individual of Stenotrema hirsutum
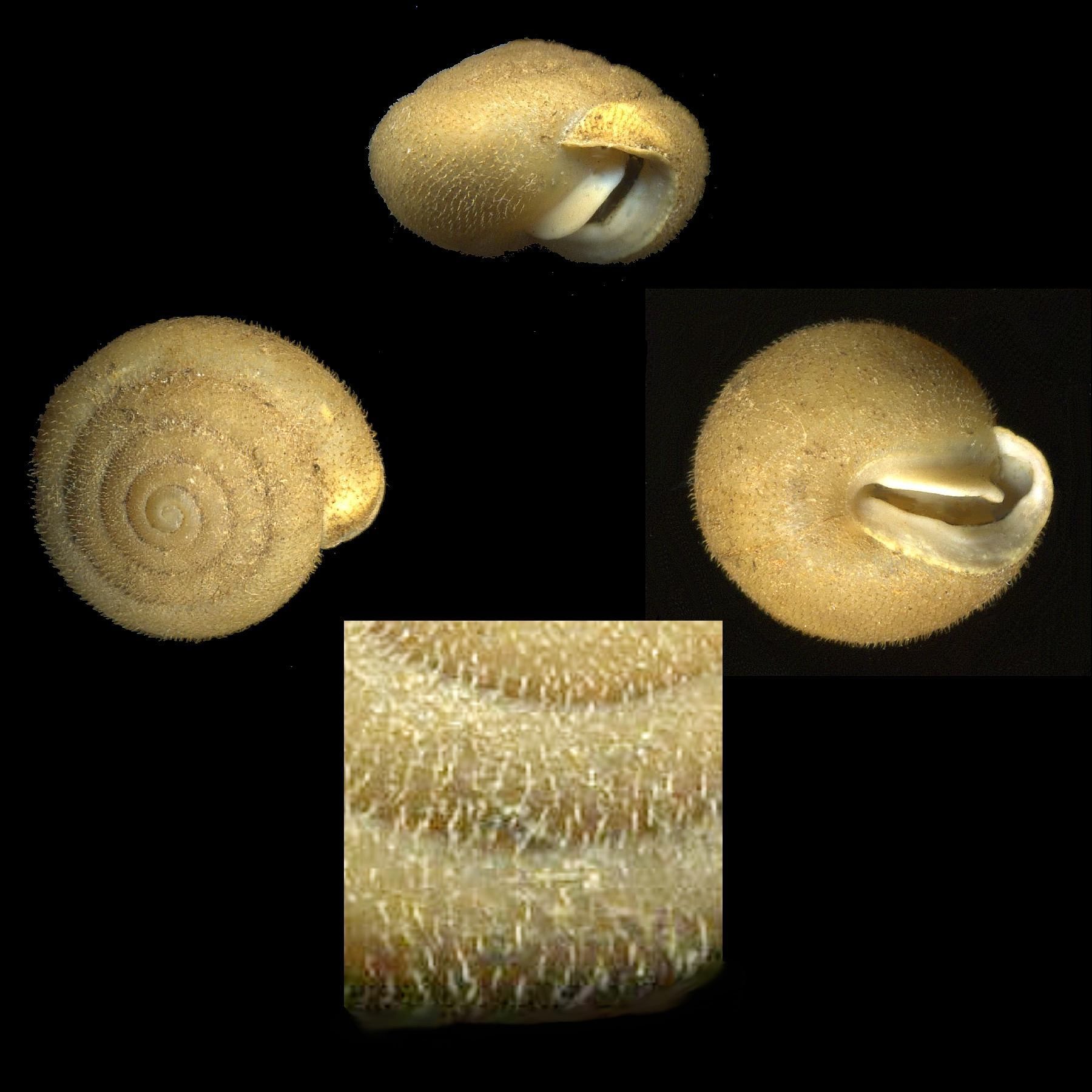
- Three views of a shell of Stenotrema florida, with a close-up view of the periostracal "hairs" that are typical of the genus

Scientific classification
- Kingdom: Animalia
- Phylum: Mollusca
- Class: Gastropoda
- Order: Stylommatophora
- Family: Polygyridae
- Genus: Stenotrema; Rafinesque, 1819

= Stenotrema =

Genus of gastropods

Stenotrema is a genus of air-breathing land snails, terrestrial pulmonate gastropod molluscs in the family Polygyridae. Members of this genus are known as slitmouths. These are typically small to medium-sized snails, with a velvety or hairy shell surface, and a narrow aperture which is usually closely guarded by well-developed "teeth".

== Distribution ==
The genus occurs throughout most of North America, from Alaska, though Canada and the United States, into Mexico.

== Species ==
Genus Stenotrema contains the following species and subspecies:

- Stenotrema altispira (Pilsbry, 1894) — Highland slitmouth
- Stenotrema angellum (Hubricht, 1958) — Kentucky slitmouth
- Stenotrema barbigerum (Redfield, 1856) — Fringed slitmouth
- Stenotrema blandianum (Pilsbry, 1903) — Missouri slitmouth
- Stenotrema brevipila (Clap, 1907) — Talladega slitmouth
- Stenotrema burringtoni (Grimm, 1971)
- Stenotrema calvescens (Hubricht, 1961) — Chattanooga slitmouth
- Stenotrema cohuttense (Clapp, 1914) — Cohutta slitmouth
- Stenotrema deceptum (Clapp, 1905) — Monte Sano slitmouth
- Stenotrema depilatum (Pilsbry, 1895) — Great Smoky slitmouth
- Stenotrema edgarianum (Lea, 1841) — Sequatchie slitmouth
- Stenotrema edvardsi (Bland, 1856) — Ridge-and-valley slitmouth
- Stenotrema exodon (Pilsbry, 1900) — Alabama slitmouth
  - Stenotrema exodon turbinella (Clench & Archer, 1933)
- Stenotrema florida (Pilsbry, 1940) — Apalachicola slitmouth
- Stenotrema hirsutum (Say, 1817) — Hairy slitmouth
  - Stenotrema hirsutum barbatum (Clapp, 1904)
- Stenotrema hubrichti Pilsbry, 1940 / Euchemotrema hubrichti (Pilsbry, 1940) — Carinate pillsnail
- Stenotrema labrosum (Bland 1862) — Ozark slitmouth
- Stenotrema macgregori (Dourson, 2011) — Fraudulent slitmouth
- Stenotrema magnifumosum (Pilsbry, 1900) — Appalachian slitmouth
- Stenotrema maxillatum (Gould, 1848) — Ridge-lip slitmouth
- Stenotrema morosum (Hubricht, 1978)
- Stenotrema pilsbryi (Ferriss, 1900) — Rich Mountain Slitmouth
- Stenotrema pilula (Pilsbry, 1900) — Pygmy slitmouth
- Stenotrema simile (Grimm, 1971) — Bear Creek slitmouth
- Stenotrema spinosum (Lea, 1830) — Carinate slitmouth
- Stenotrema stenotrema (Pfeiffer, 1842) — Inland slitmouth
- Stenotrema unciferum (Pilsbry, 1900) — Ouachita slitmouth
  - Stenotrema unciferum caddoense (Archer, 1935)
- Stenotrema waldense (Archer, 1938) — Doaks Creek slitmouth

See Euchemotrema for other closely related taxa, many of which are sometimes placed in Stenotrema.
