= Giffordius =

Scientific classification
- Kingdom: Animalia
- Phylum: Mollusca
- Class: Gastropoda
- Order: Stylommatophora
- Family: Polygyridae
- Subfamily: Polygyrinae
- Genus: Giffordius; Pilsbry, 1930

Genus of gastropods

Giffordius is a genus of air-breathing land snails, terrestrial pulmonate gastropod molluscs in the family Polygyridae.

The two known species, found on Isla de Providencia (or Old Providence), were named after the early conservationist and politician, Gifford Pinchot and his wife, Cornelia, whose expedition discovered them. These snails are unusual among polygyrids in being ovoviviparous rather than oviparous.

== Species ==
The genus Giffordius contains the following species:

- Giffordius corneliae
- Giffordius pinchotii

== See also ==
- Pinchot South Sea Expedition
