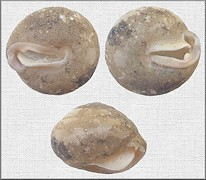
- Talladega slitmouth found at Mt. Cheaha in Chebourne County, Alabama

Conservation status
- Imperiled (NatureServe)

Scientific classification
- Kingdom: Animalia
- Phylum: Mollusca
- Class: Gastropoda
- Order: Stylommatophora
- Family: Polygyridae
- Genus: Stenotrema
- Species: S. brevipila

Binomial name
- Stenotrema brevipila (G.H. Clapp, 1903)

Synonyms
- Polygyra (Stenotrema) brevipila G. H. Clapp, 1907 (original combination); Polygyra brevipila G. H. Clapp, 1907 ·(unaccepted combination); Polygyra brevipila cherokeensis G. H. Clapp, 1916; Stenotrema (Stenotrema) brevipila (G. H. Clapp, 1907) alternative representation

= Stenotrema brevipila =

Species of land snail

Stenotrema brevipila, also known as the Talladega slitmouth, is a species of pulmonate land snail in the family Polygyridae.

The species is named after Horseblock Mountain, also known as Talladega Mountain, in Talladega County, Alabama.

== Physical appearance ==
The Talladega slitmouth possesses an imperforate, globose, convex, reddish-brown shell covered with fine, short hairs typical among members of the Stenotrema genus. There are 5 whorls, and it is equally rounded on both the top and bottom. The aperture is pale, transverse, and very narrow, with its margin extending outwards from the shell. There is a defined parietal tooth that projects beyond the aperture lip.

The Talladega slitmouth is most visually similar to Stenotrema altispira, the highland slitmouth.

== Ecology ==
The Talladega slitmouth is endemic to the southeastern United States, where it can be found in Georgia and Alabama. The species is listed as imperiled globally.

This species is most commonly found around rocky outcrops and talus, on or under rocks or leaf litter. They are commonly found in mountainous areas with high elevation (around 2,000 ft or 609 meters). Herbert H. Smith claimed the species is difficult to find, commenting that surveyors would turn over "perhaps fifty" large rocks to find only one shell.
