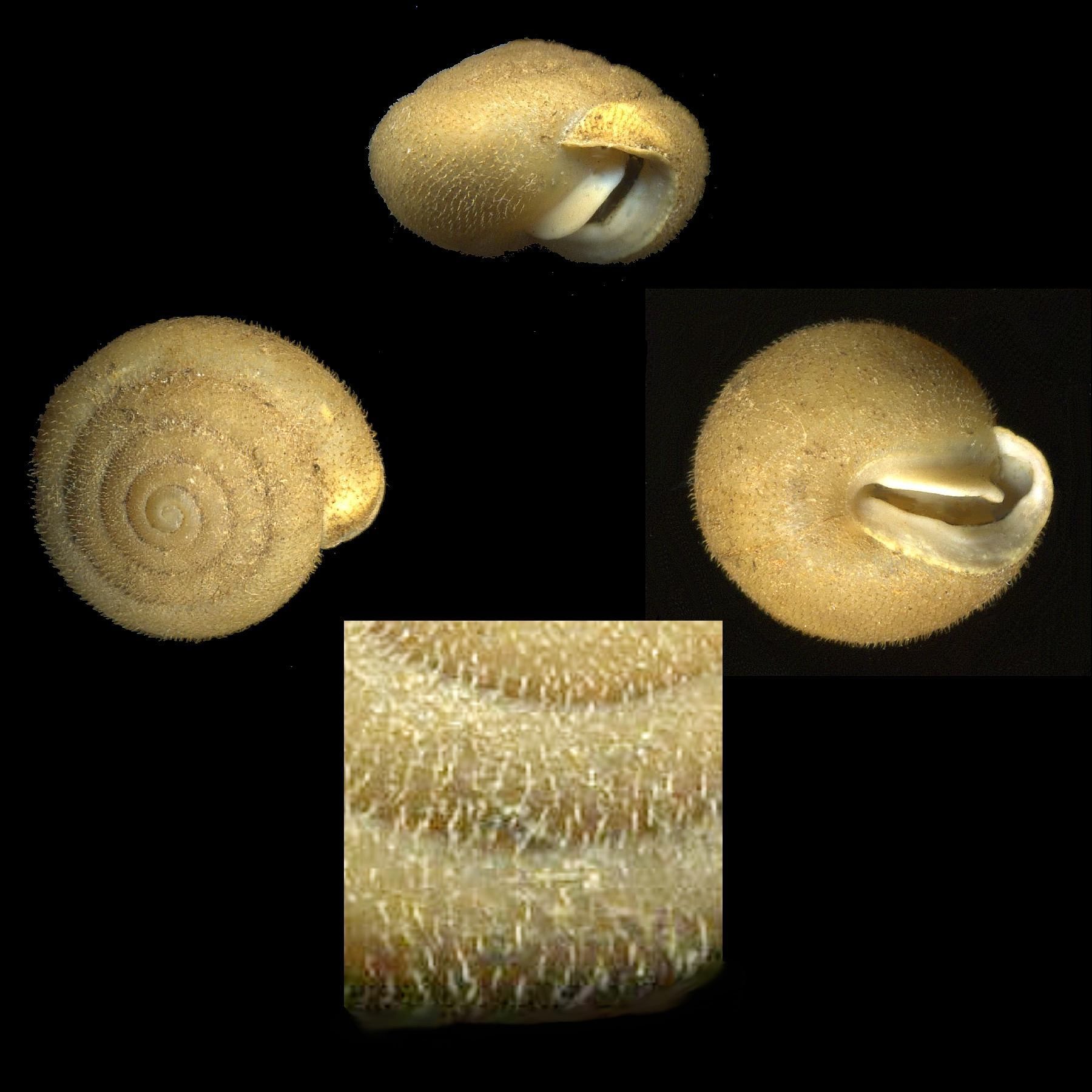
- Stenotrema florida shell with a close-up view of the periostracal "hairs"

Conservation status
- Vulnerable (NatureServe)

Scientific classification
- Kingdom: Animalia
- Phylum: Mollusca
- Class: Gastropoda
- Order: Stylommatophora
- Family: Polygyridae
- Genus: Stenotrema
- Species: S. florida

Binomial name
- Stenotrema florida Pilsbry, 1940

= Stenotrema florida =

Species of gastropod

Stenotrema florida, common name the Apalachicola slitmouth, is a species of air-breathing land snail, a terrestrial pulmonate gastropod mollusc in the family Polygyridae.

The common name refers to Apalachicola, Florida, USA.
