= Albert Kenrick Fisher =

American physician

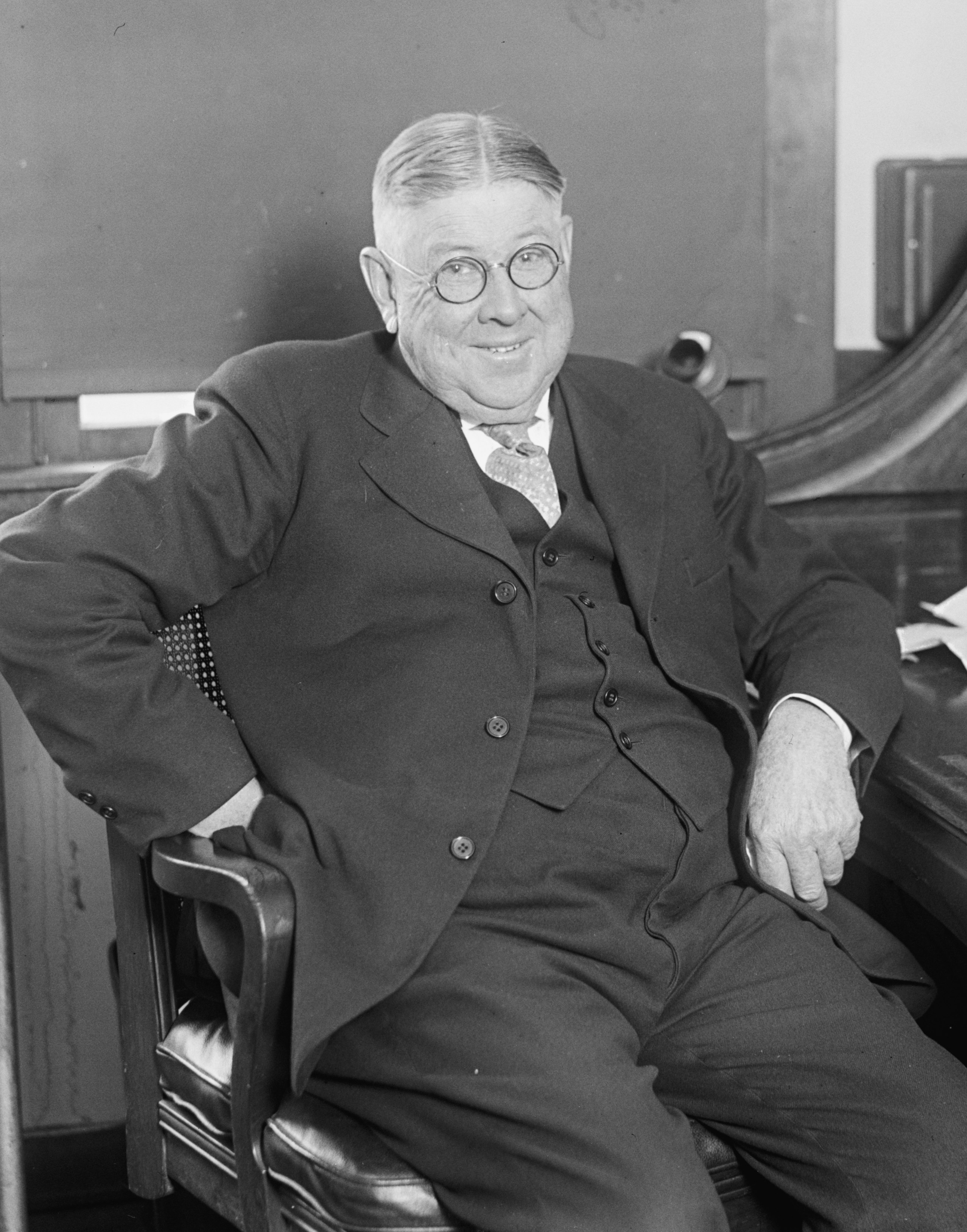
Fisher in 1929

Albert Kenrick Fisher (21 March 1856 – 12 June 1948) was an American ornithologist, known for his 1893 book The Hawks and Owls of the United States in Their Relation to Agriculture.

Fisher was born in Sing Sing, New York (now Ossining), where he graduated from Holbrook's Military High School; in 1879 he graduated from the College of Physicians and Surgeons of New York. He practiced medicine in Sing Sing until 1885. In 1883 he was a founding member of the American Ornithologists' Union. To study the role of birds in controlling insect pests, the U. S. Commissioner of Agriculture in July 1885 appointed C. Hart Merriam to create a Branch of Economic Ornithology in the U.S.D.A. Division of Entomology; Merriam hired Fisher to help establish this new Branch. In 1886 the Branch was elevated to Division status and named the "Division of Economic Ornithology and Mammalogy". The goal of the Division was to perform food-habit studies of wildlife and to educate farmers about the usefulness to farmers of some birds and mammals among wildlife. In 1896 the Division was granted independent status with expanded duties as a new Division and named the "Division of Biological Survey." A U.S. Congressional Act of 3 March 1905 enabled the creation on 1 July 1905 of a separate Bureau of Biological Survey. Fisher worked for the Bureau from its inception until his retirement in 1931.

Fisher participated in the Death Valley Expedition in 1891, the Harriman Alaska Expedition in 1899, and the Pinchot South Seas Expedition in 1929. Many bird skins collected by Fisher on these 3 expeditions are now in the National Museum of Natural History.

He was the president of the American Ornithologists' Union in 1914–1917. He wrote 150 papers on ornithology or other zoological subjects with a few obituaries. A list of his papers, complete to 21 March 1926, was published in the Proceedings of the Biological Society of Washington.

Fisher and his wife had two sons and two daughters. He played an important role in the conservation movement and was a personal friend of several famous conservationists, including Gifford Pinchot and Theodore Roosevelt. He died in Washington, D.C., aged 92.
