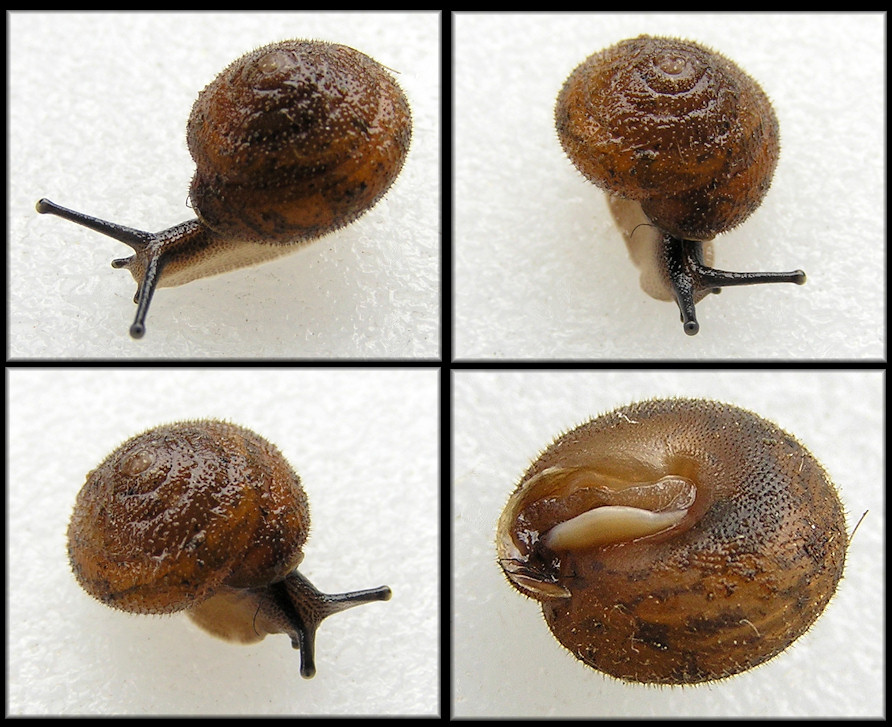
- A highland slitmouth found in Caldwell County, North Carolina

Conservation status
- Vulnerable (NatureServe)

Scientific classification
- Kingdom: Animalia
- Phylum: Mollusca
- Class: Gastropoda
- Order: Stylommatophora
- Family: Polygyridae
- Genus: Stenotrema
- Species: S. altispira

Binomial name
- Stenotrema altispira (Pilsbry, 1894)

Synonyms
- Polygyra hirsuta altispira (Pilsbry, 1894)

= Stenotrema altispira =

Species of land snail

Stenotrema altispira, also known as the highland slitmouth, is a species of pulmonate land snail in the family Polygridae. The species is endemic to the southeastern United States.

== Physical appearance ==
The highland slitmouth possesses a brown, domed shell that is slightly taller than other species in the Stenotrema genus. Adult snails typically range from 8.5 to 11 mm (0.33 to 0.43 in) in length and 6.5–8 mm (0.26–0.31 in) in height. The shell's surface is covered with short, stiff hairs. The aperture is paler than the rest of the shell, with a narrow opening and a long parietal tooth.

== Ecology ==
The highland slitmouth is endemic to North America, and can be found in three states: North Carolina, Virginia, and Tennessee. The species is listed as vulnerable globally, and listed as vulnerable in North Carolina, imperiled in Tennessee, and critically imperiled in Virginia. The species can only be found in Grayson and Smyth Counties in Virginia, and is therefore at risk of extirpation.

This species is found in high elevations along mountain ridges, typically around 1,100 to 2,000 meters (3,600 to 6,600 ft) in elevation. Individuals are most commonly found crawling on leaf litter, herbaceous vegetation, or woody debris in hardwood or mixed hardwood forests.
