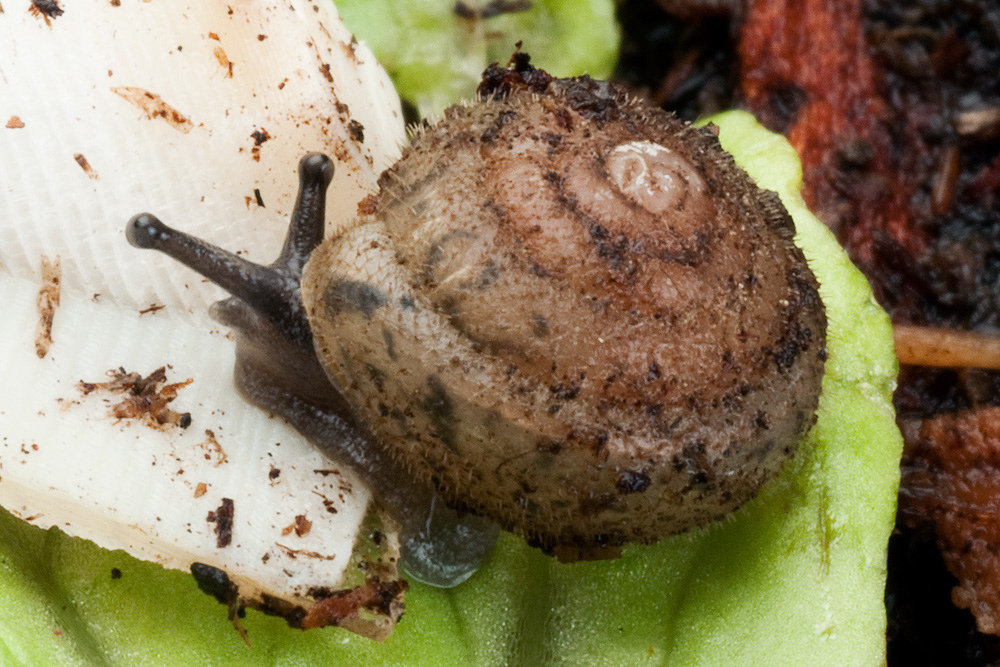
- A live individual of Stenotrema hirsutum
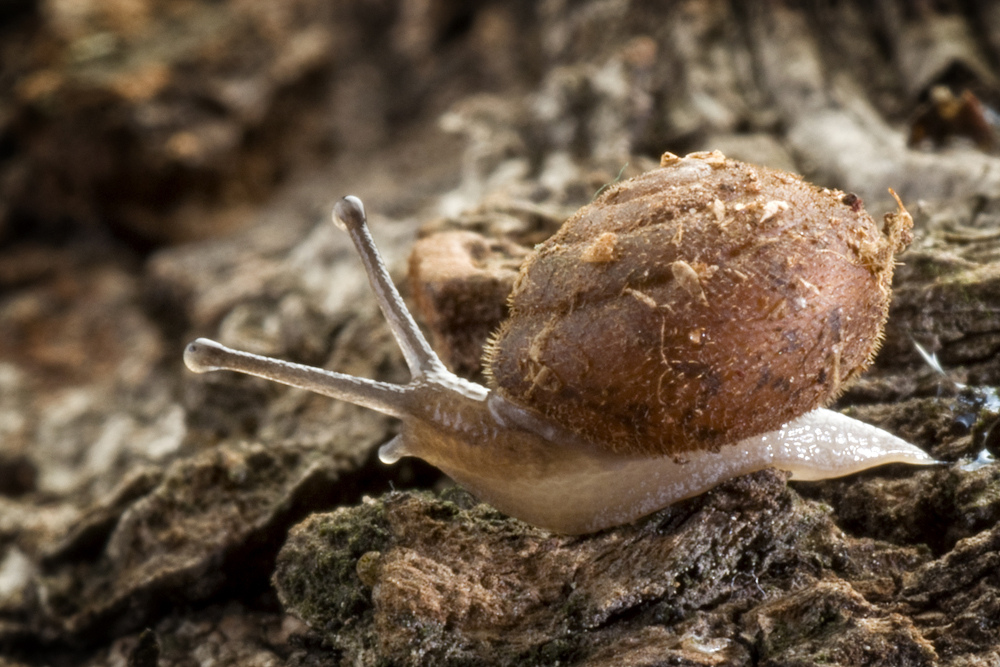
- Live Stenotrema hirsutum

Conservation status
- Secure (NatureServe)

Scientific classification
- Kingdom: Animalia
- Phylum: Mollusca
- Class: Gastropoda
- Order: Stylommatophora
- Family: Polygyridae
- Genus: Stenotrema
- Species: S. hirsutum

Binomial name
- Stenotrema hirsutum (Say, 1817)

= Stenotrema hirsutum =

Species of gastropod

Stenotrema hirsutum, common name hairy slitmouth, is a species of air-breathing land snail, a terrestrial pulmonate gastropod mollusc in the family Polygyridae.
