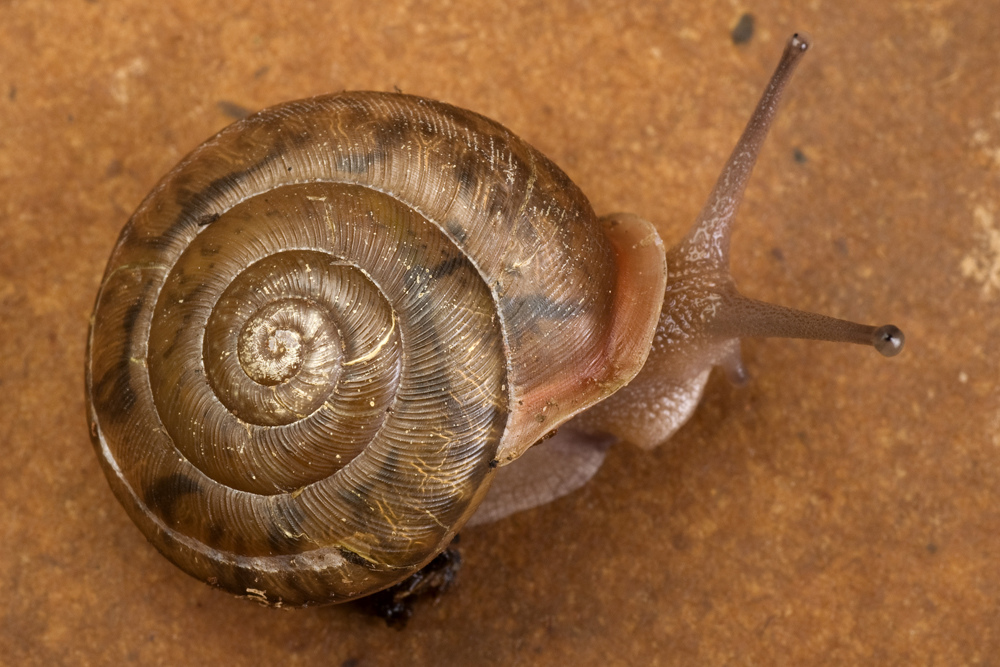
- A live individual of Neohelix dentifera
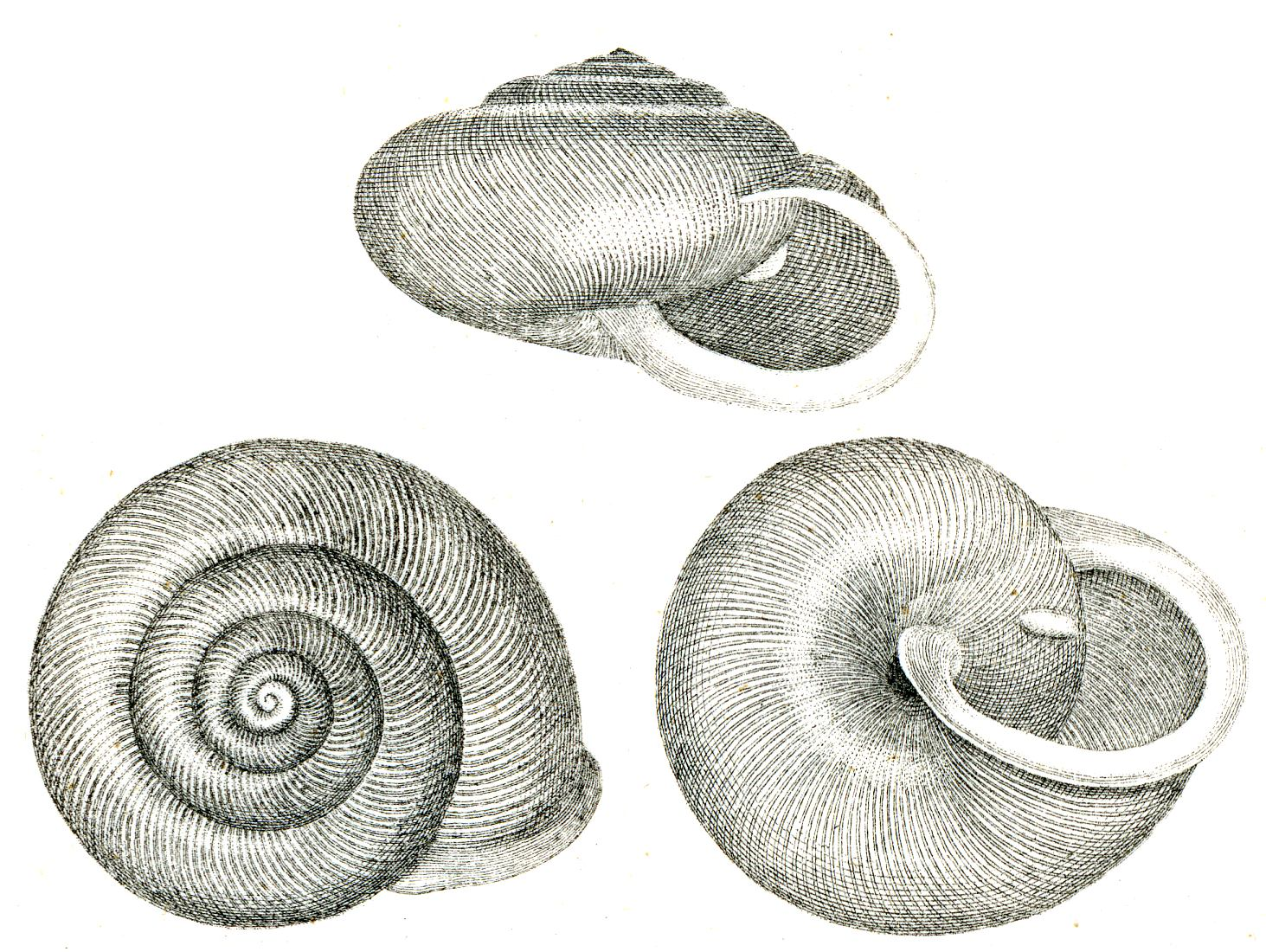
- Three views of a shell of Mesodon thyroidus from W. G. Binney, 1878

Scientific classification
- Kingdom: Animalia
- Phylum: Mollusca
- Class: Gastropoda
- Order: Stylommatophora
- Suborder: Helicina
- Infraorder: Helicoidei
- Superfamily: Helicoidea
- Family: Polygyridae; Pilsbry, 1895

Genera
- See text

= Polygyridae =

Family of gastropods

Polygyridae is a family of air-breathing land snails, terrestrial pulmonate gastropod mollusks in the superfamily Helicoidea.

The Polygyridae make up a significant proportion of the land snail fauna of eastern North America, and are also found in western North America, northern Central America, and are present on some Caribbean islands. The definitive reference to the group is Henry Pilsbry's 1940 monograph.

== Anatomy ==
This snail family is distinguished from other gastropods on the basis of several anatomical features: They have no dart apparatus (see love dart), the muscles which allow the eyes and pharynx to be retracted are united into a single band, and the jaws are ribbed.

In this family, the number of haploid chromosomes lies between 26 and 35 (according to the values in this table).

== Taxonomy ==
According to the Taxonomy of the Gastropoda (Bouchet & Rocroi, 2005) this family consists of the following subfamilies and tribes:

- Subfamily Polygyrinae Pilsbry, 1895
  - tribe Allogonini Emberton, 1995
  - tribe Ashmunellini Webb, 1954
  - tribe Polygyrini Pilsbry, 1895
    - subtribe Mesodontina Tryon, 1866
    - subtribe Polygyrina Pilsbry, 1895
    - subtribe Stenotrematina Emberton, 1995
- Subfamily Triodopsinae Pilsbry, 1940

== Genera ==
This family is defined by an absent diverticulum and absent stimulatory organ. The two subfamilies, Polygyrinae and Triodopsinae, are distinguished on the basis of reproductive anatomy, as some species in the subfamily Polygyrinae show a penial appendage. This family is monophyletic.

Pilsbry uses the generic names Allogona, Ashmunella, Giffordius, Mesodon, Polygyra, Praticolella, Stenotrema, Trilobopsis, Triodopsis, and Vespericola. The remaining names listed here have either been elevated from Pilsbry's subgenera since 1940, or newly created.

Subfamily Polygyrinae:

- Appalachina
- Daedalochila
- Euchemotrema
- Fumonelix
- Giffordius
- Hochbergellus
- Inflectarius
- Linisa
- Lobosculum
- Mesodon
- Millerelix
- Patera
- Polygyra
- Praticolella
- Stenotrema
- Trilobopsis

Shells of species within the Polygyrinae

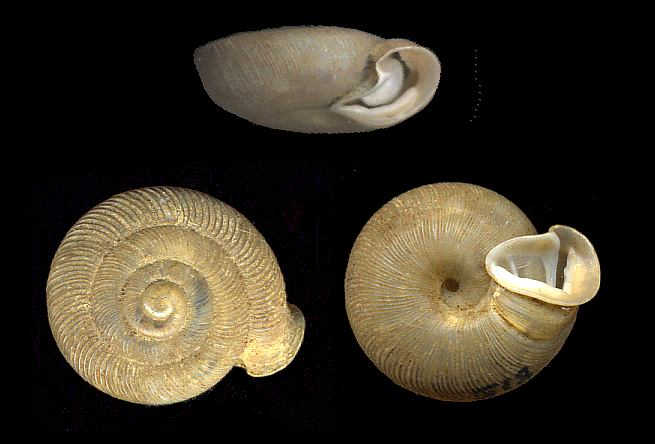
Daedalochila hippocrepis

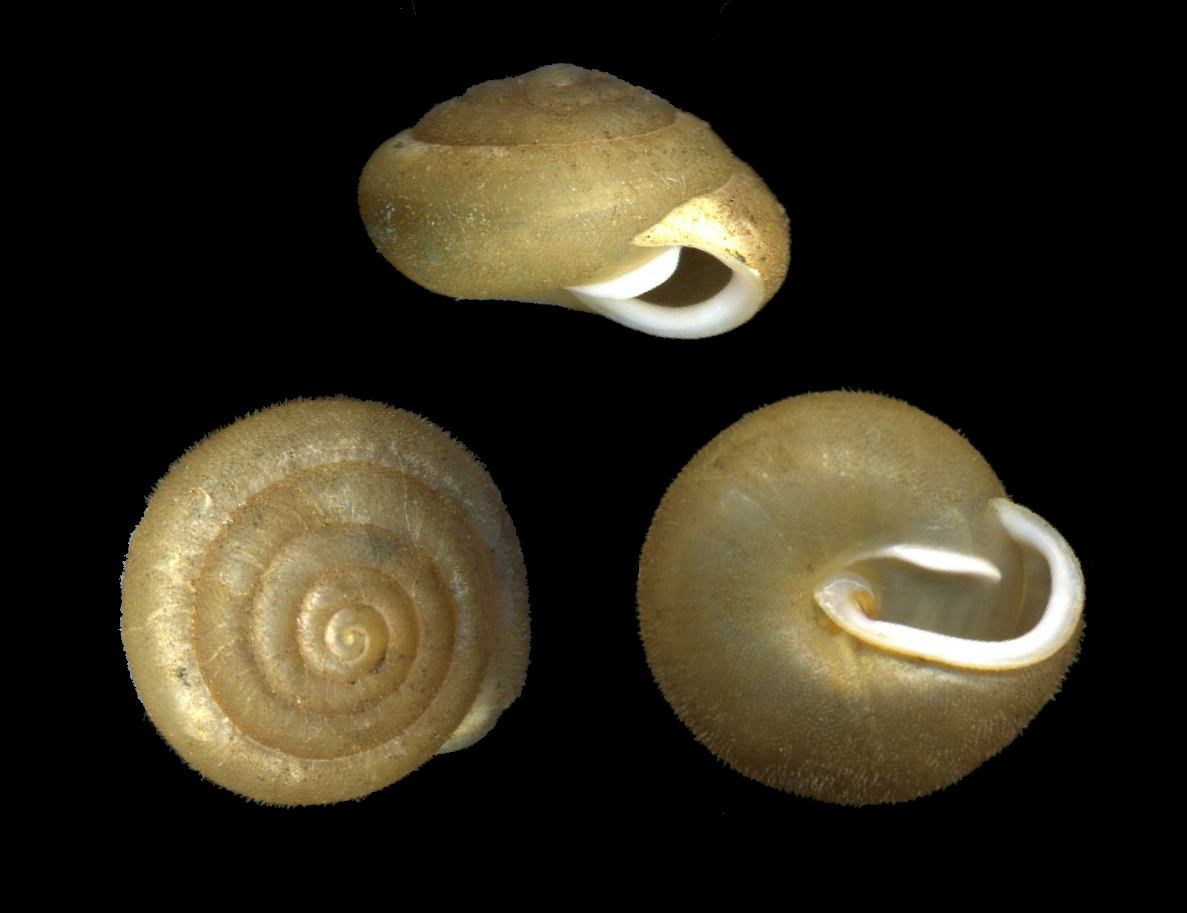
Euchemotrema fraternum

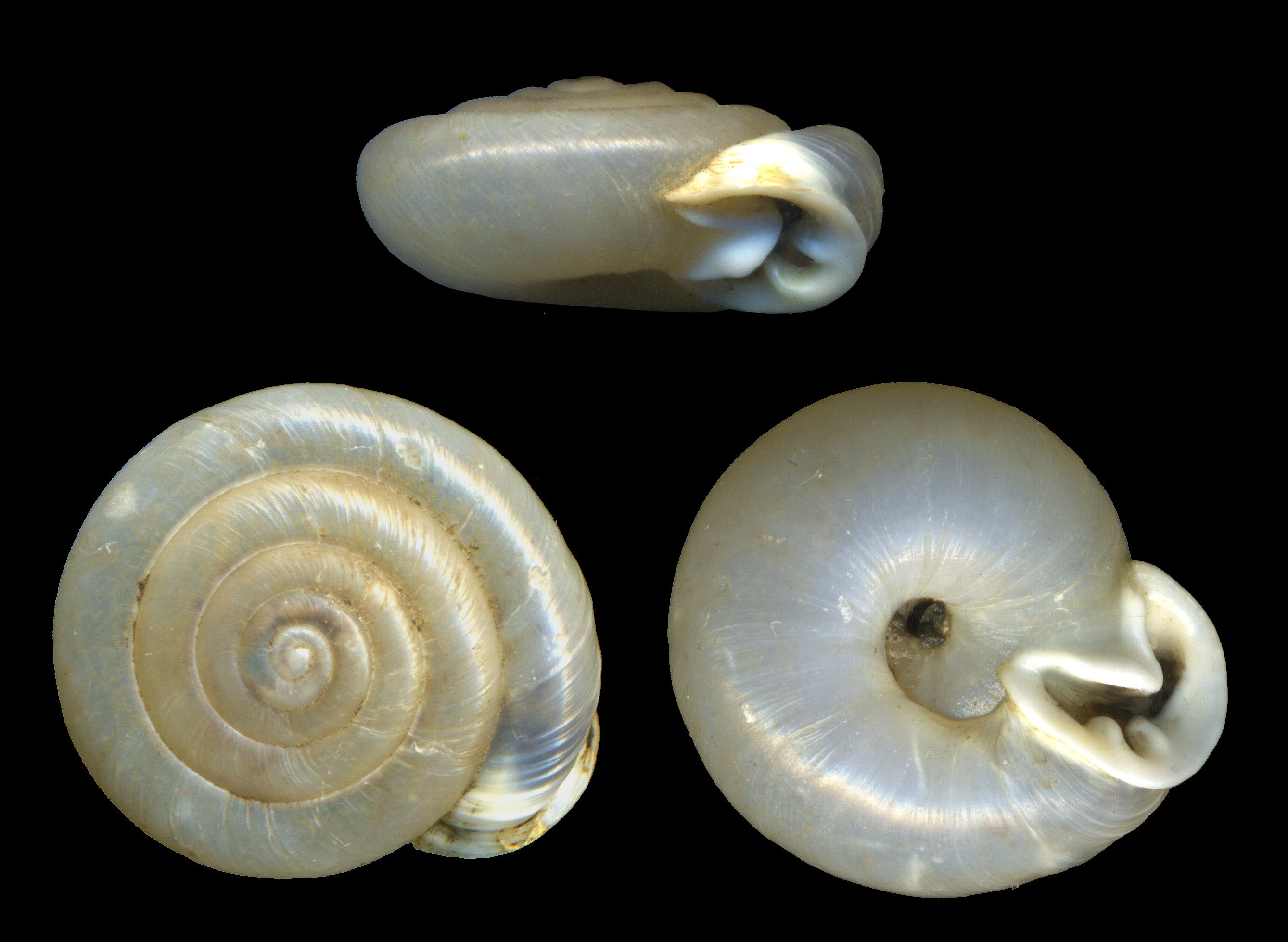
Linisa tamaulipasensis

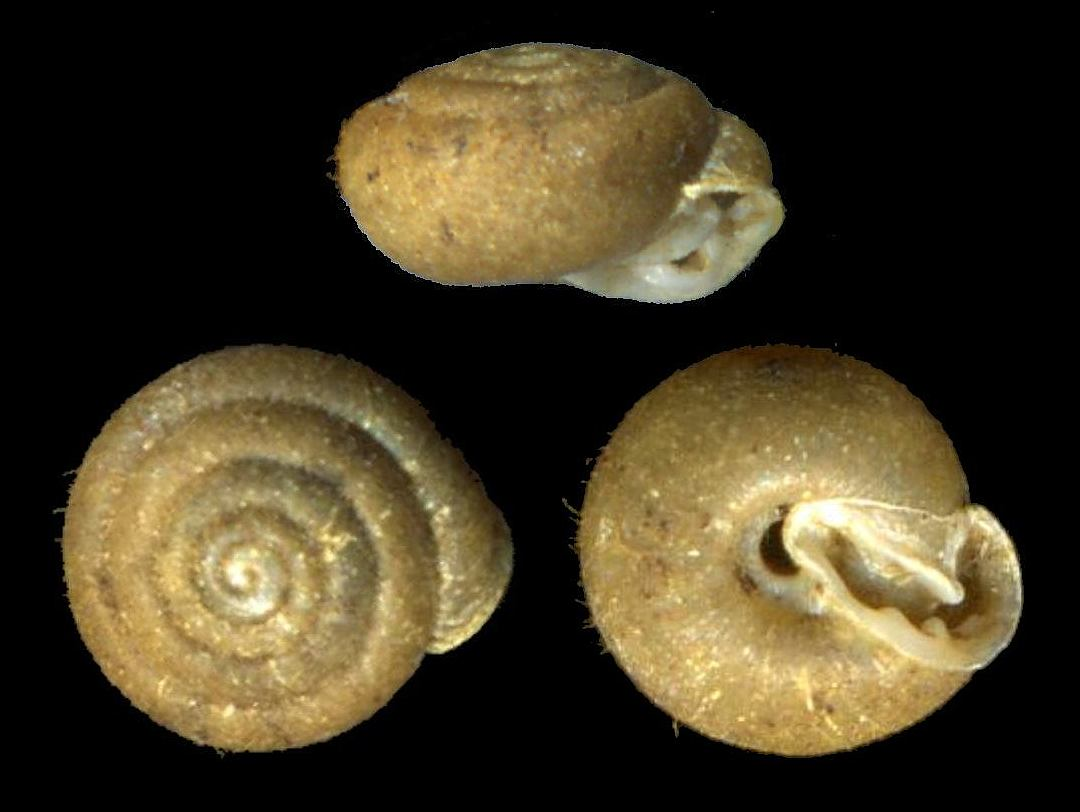
Lobosculum pustula

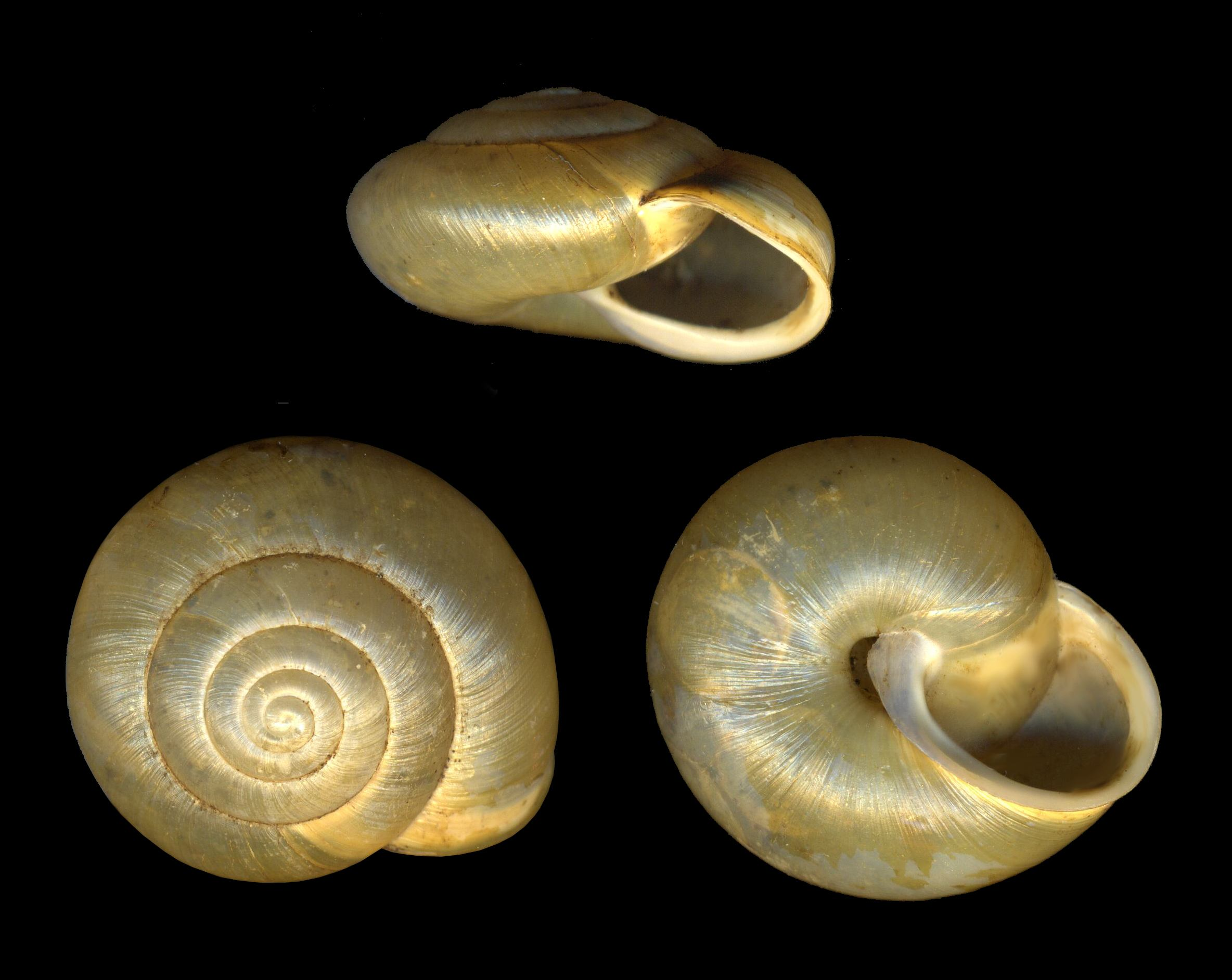
Patera clenchi

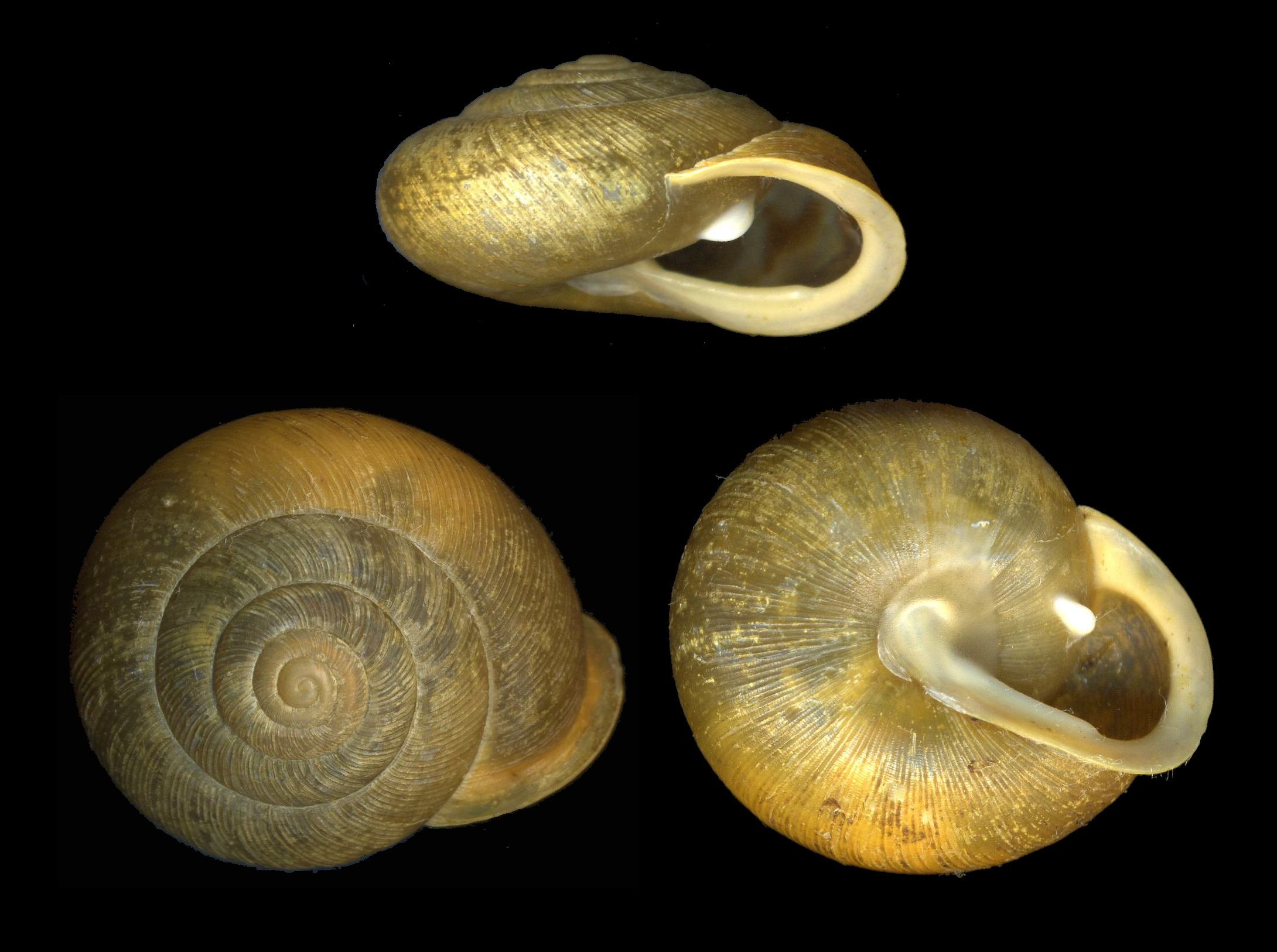
Patera perigrapta

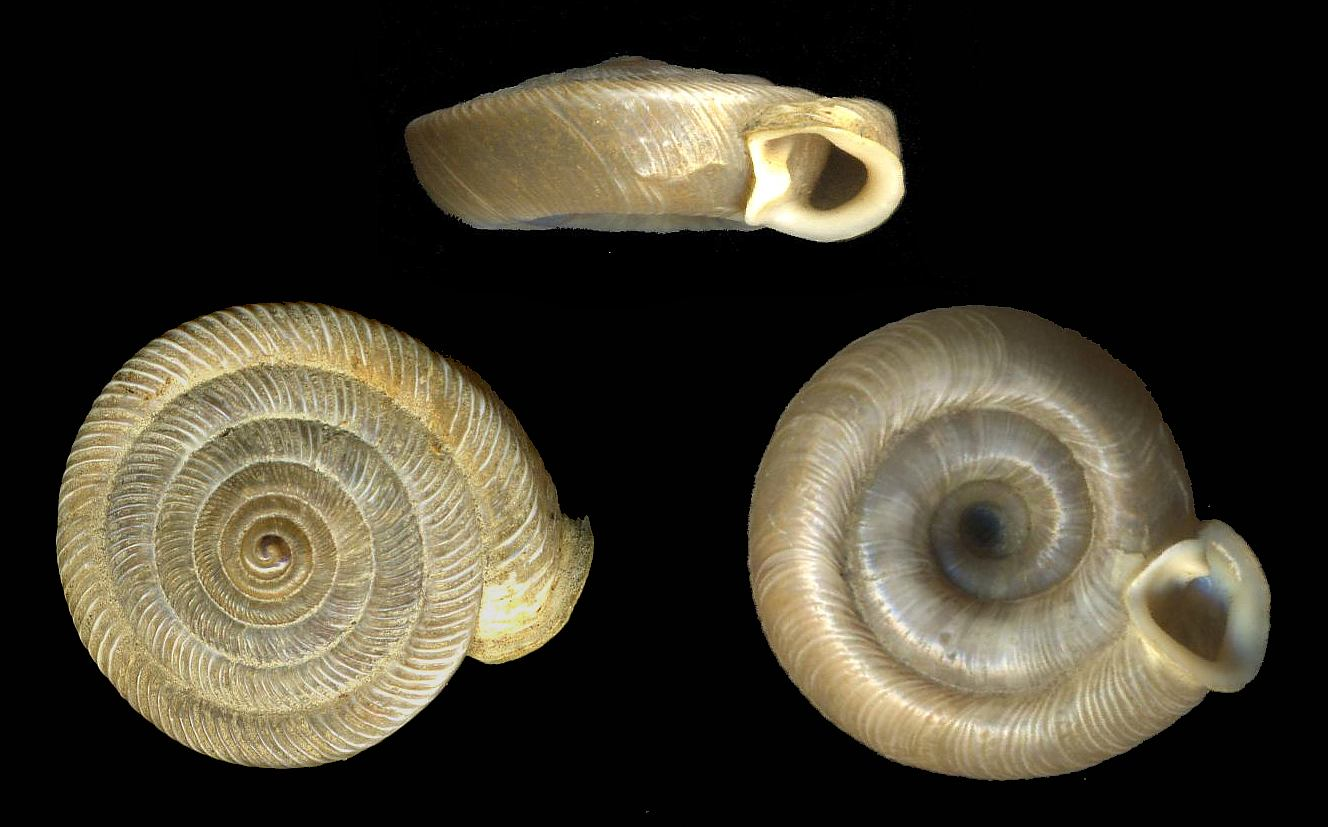
Polygyra septemvolva volvoxis

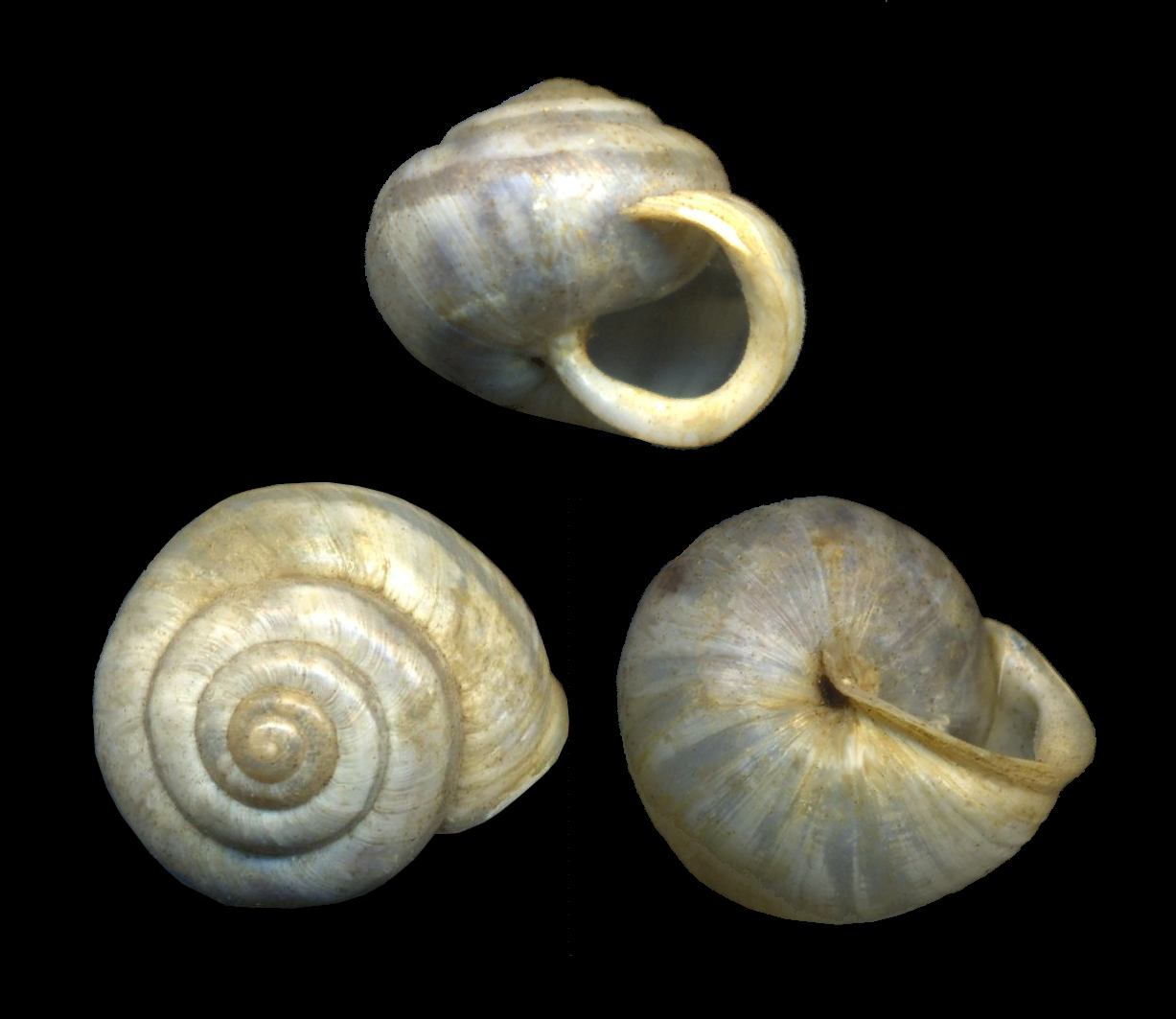
Praticolella berlandieriana

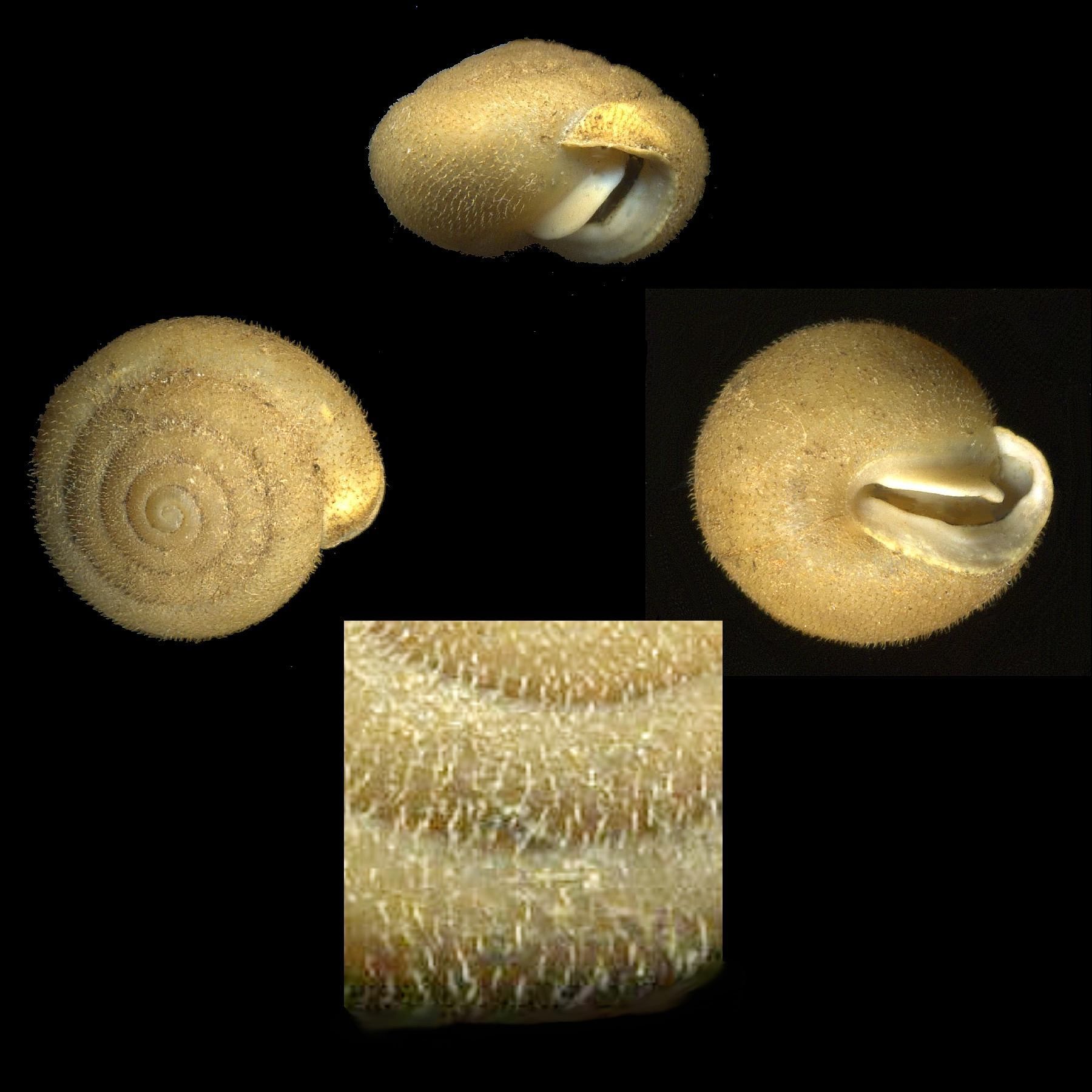
Stenotrema florida

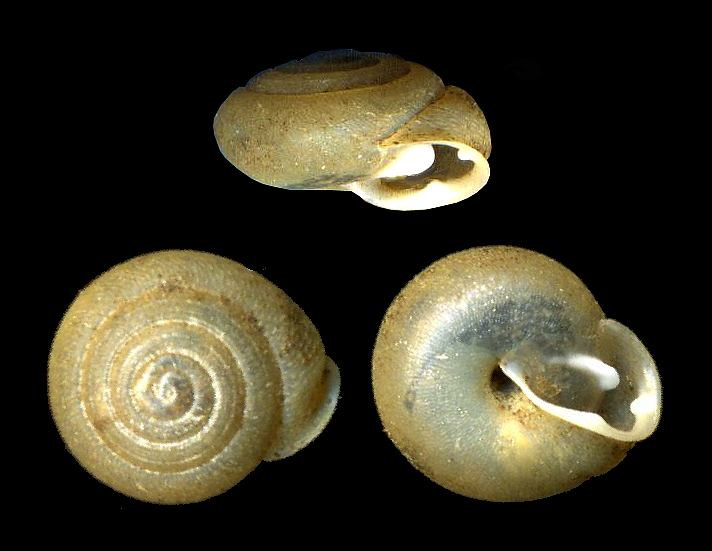
Trilobopsis loricata

Subfamily Triodopsinae:

- Allogona
- Ashmunella
- Cryptomastix
- Neohelix
- Triodopsis
- Vespericola
- Webbhelix
- Xolotrema

Shells of species within the Triodopsinae

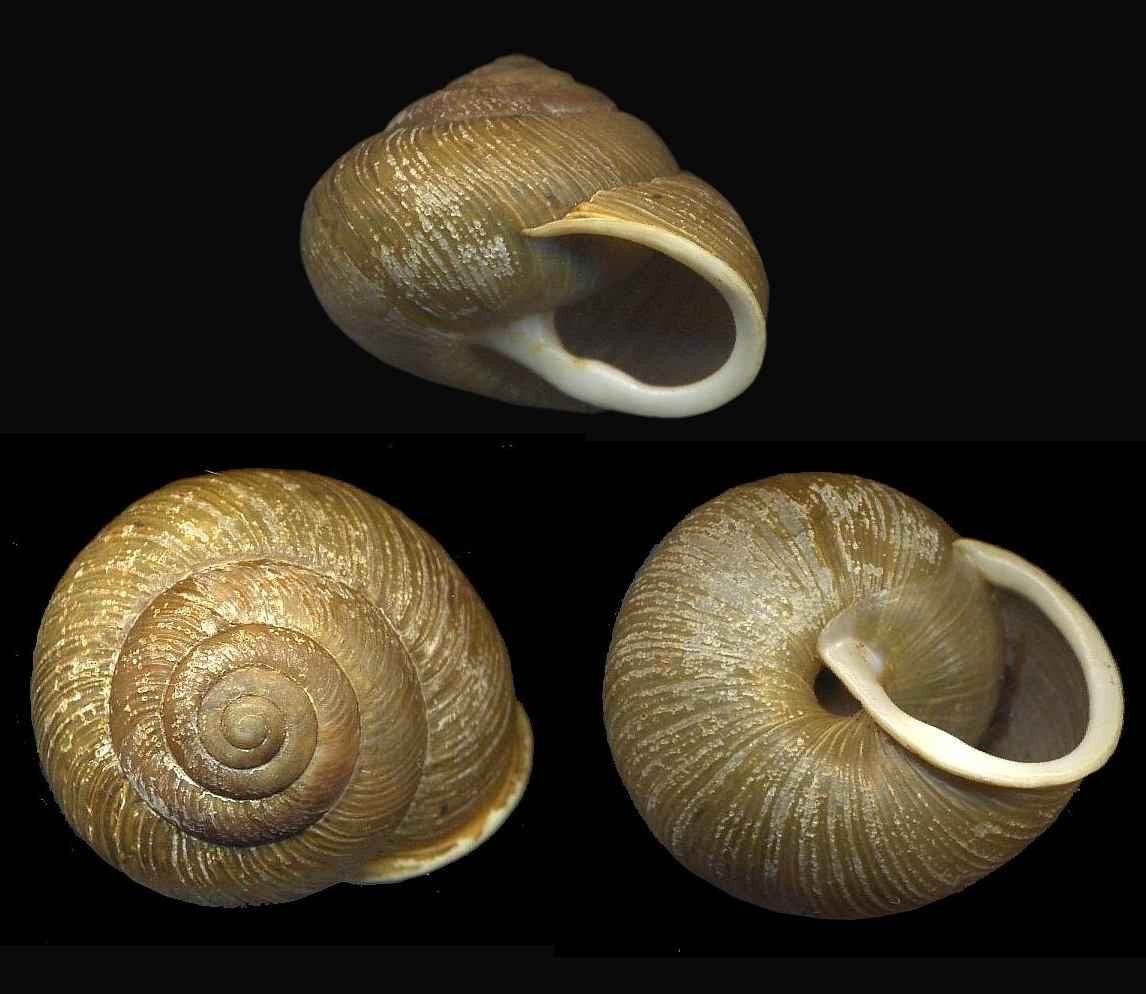
Allogona ptychophora

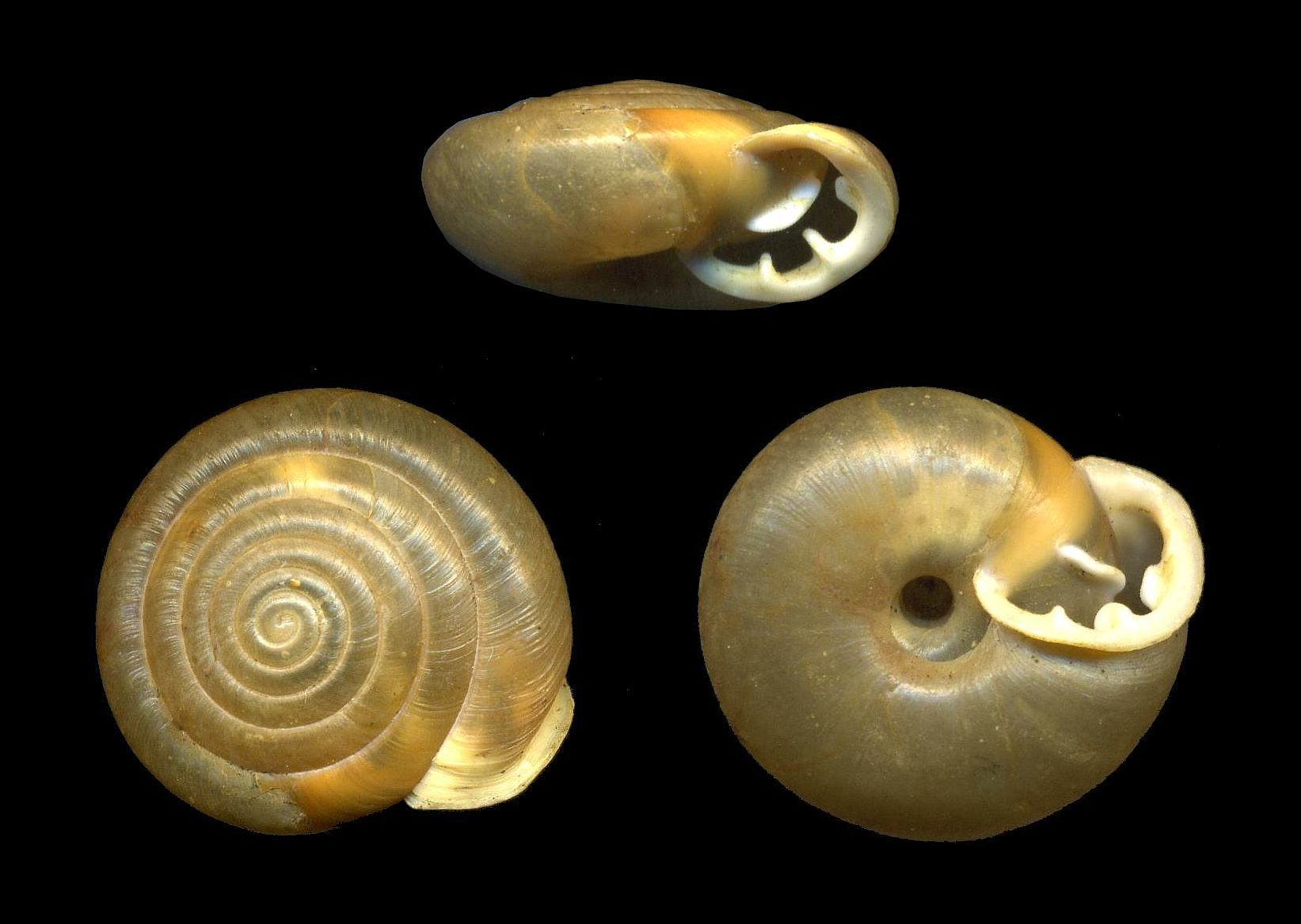
Ashmunella levettei angigyra

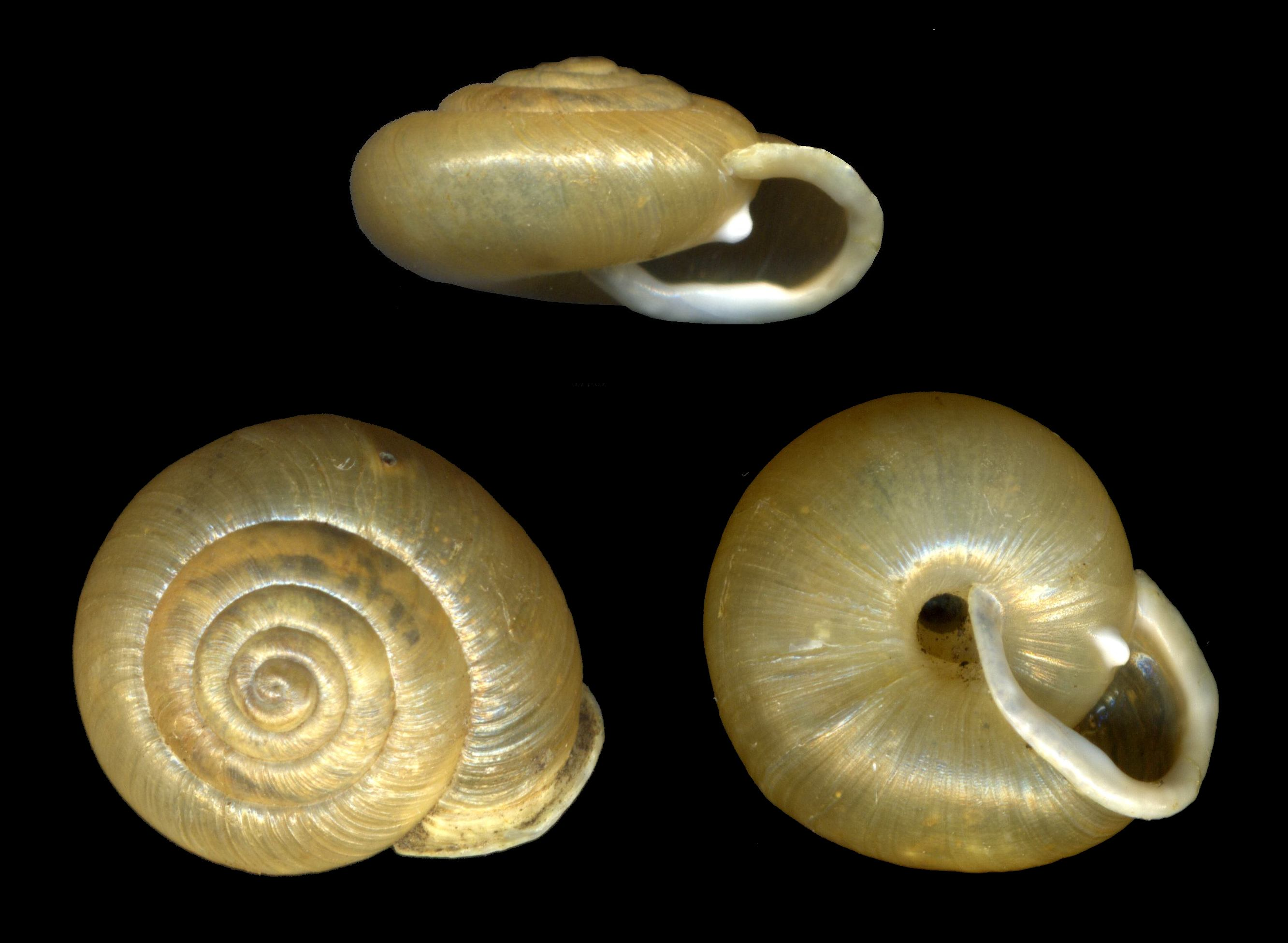
Cryptomastix mullani clappi

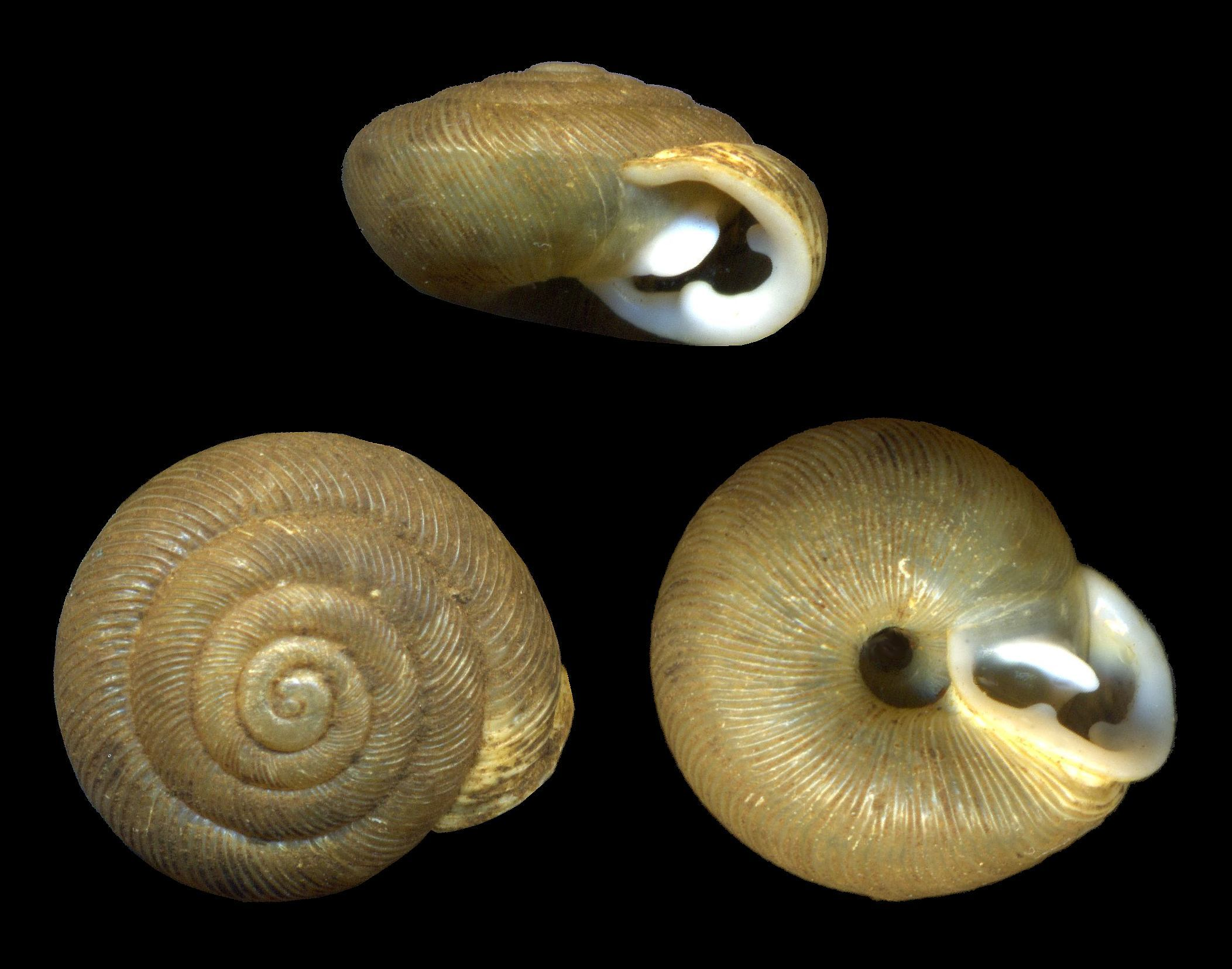
Triodopsis hopetonensis

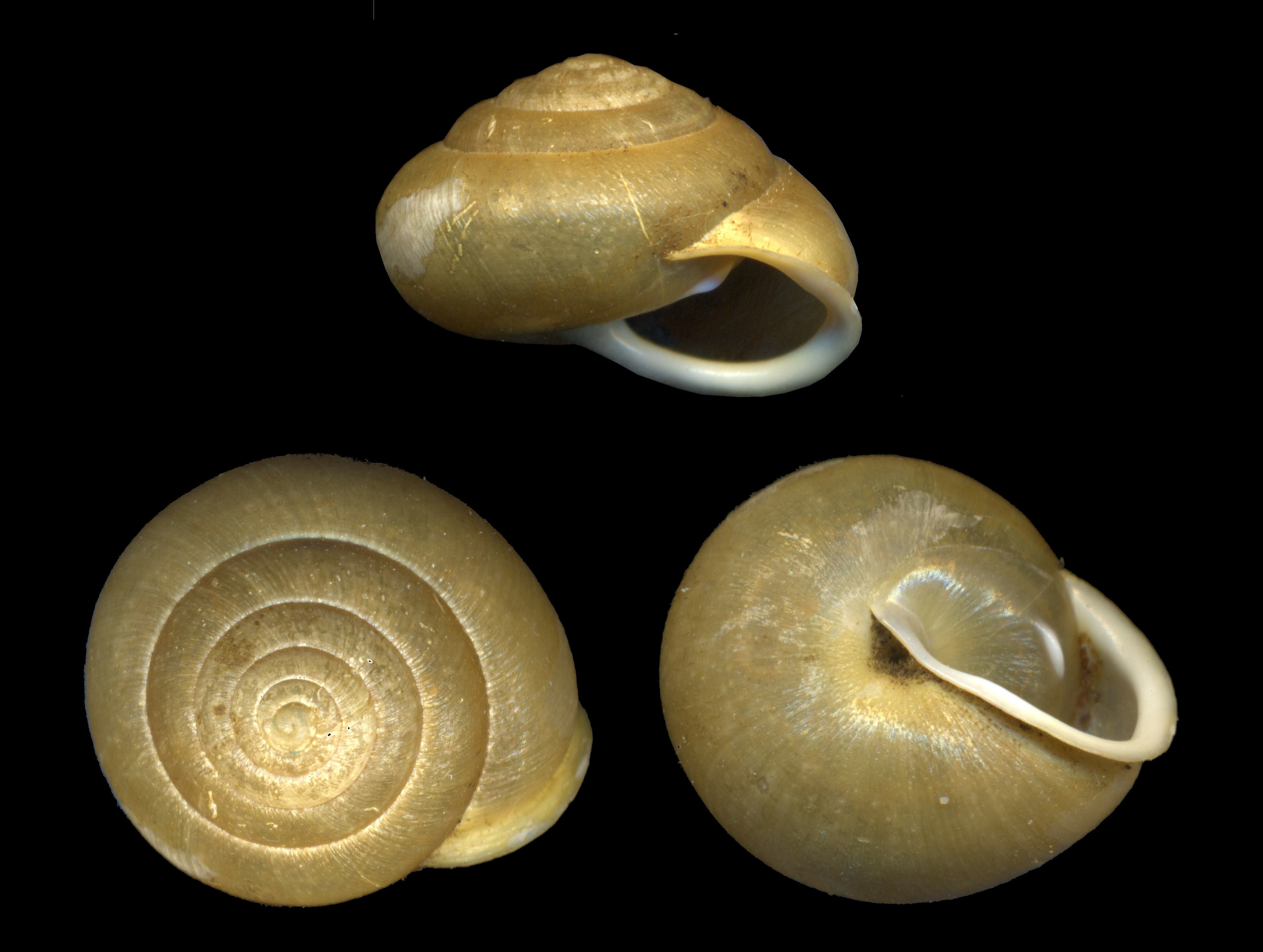
Vespericola armiger

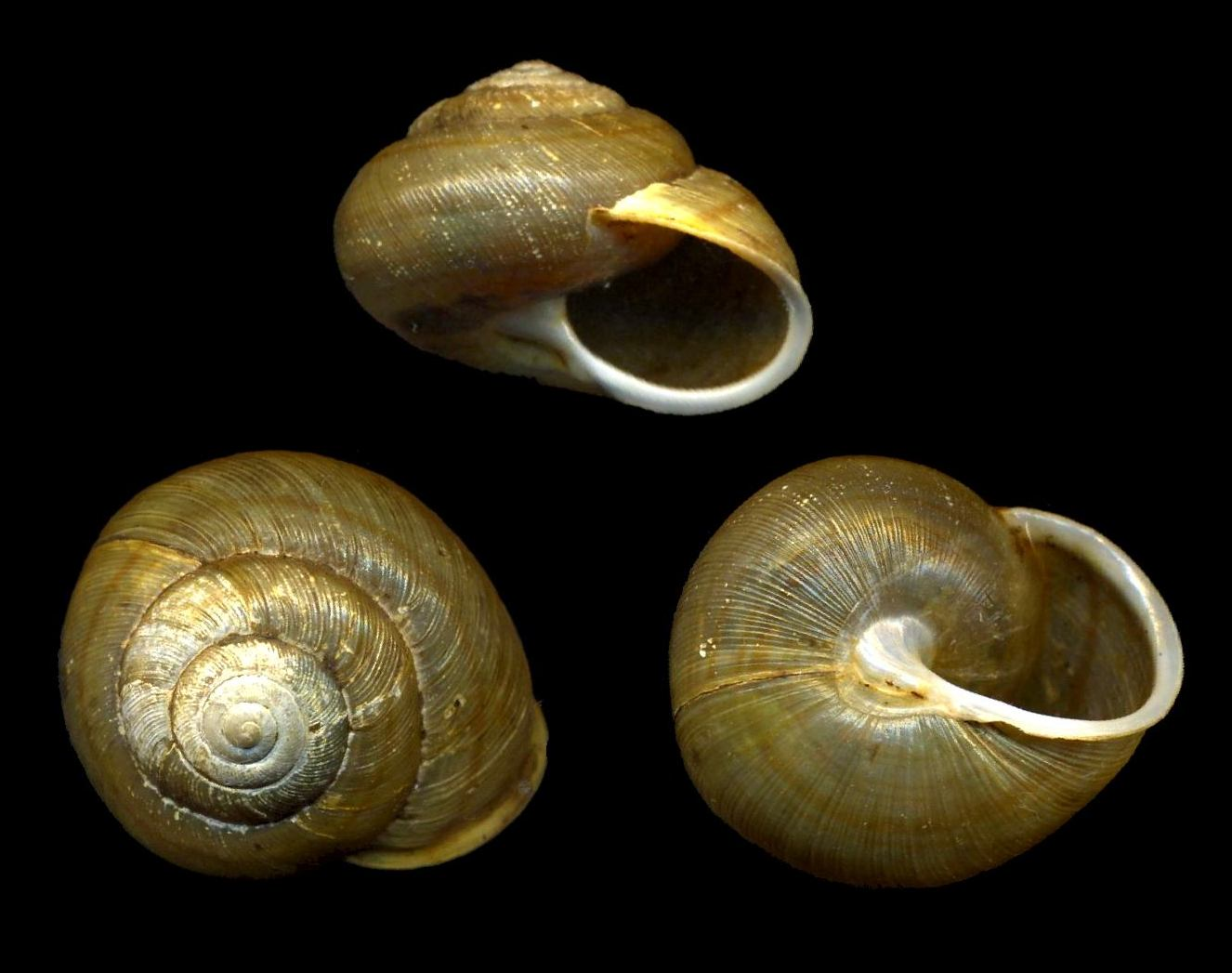
Webbhelix multilineata
