= Fauna of West Virginia =

Native animals of West Virginia

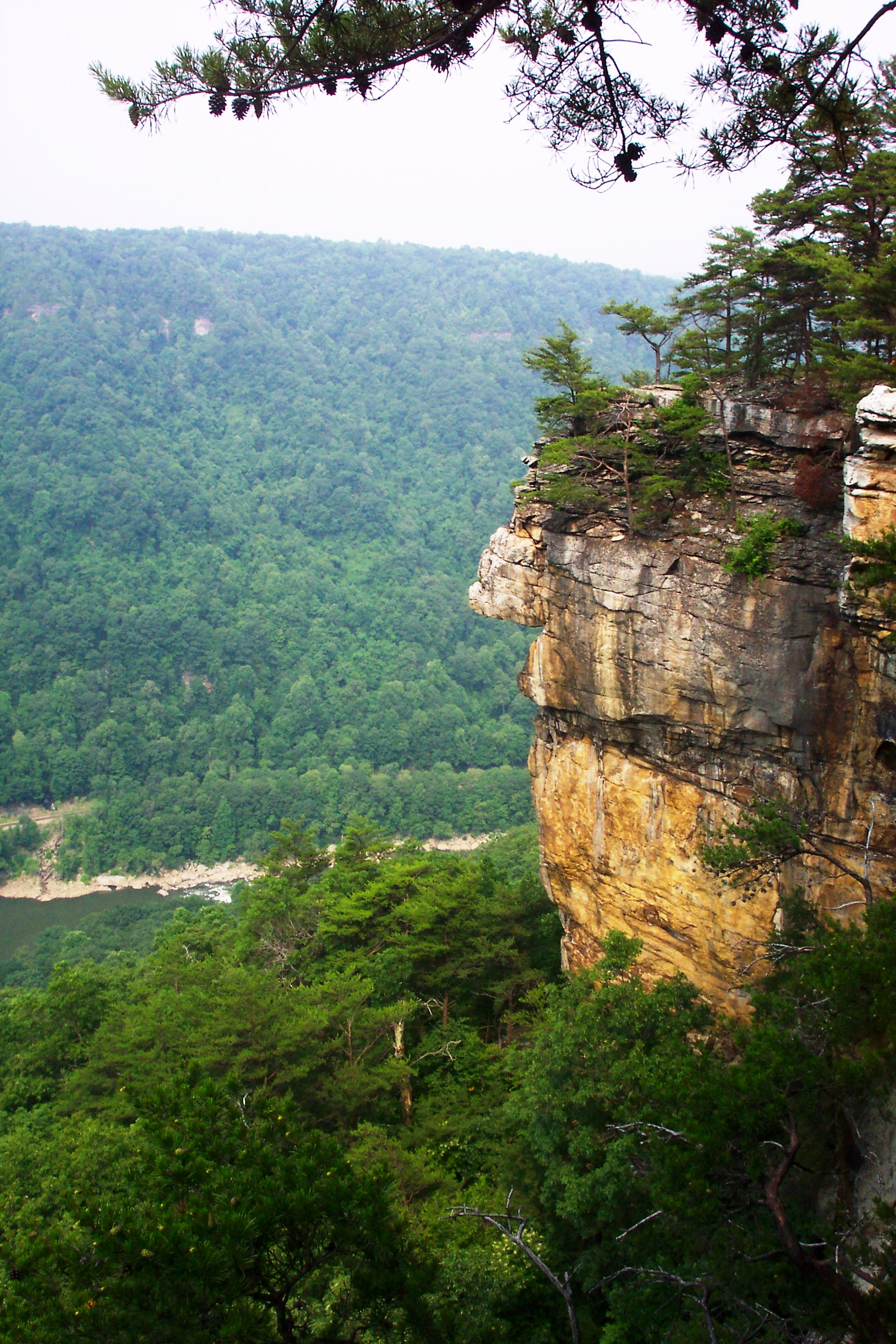
A section of the cliff at Endless Wall in New River Gorge.

The life zones of West Virginia allow for a diversity of habitats for fauna (animal life), varying from large lowland farming valleys bordered with forest and meadow to highland ridge flats and heavy forestland, some with rocky ridge-line peaks. The "Mountain State" harbors at least 56 species and subspecies of mammals. The state has more than 300 types of birds and more than 100 species of fish.

Many common insects of the Eastern United States can be found in West Virginia; 15 species of beetles, more than 70 species of odonate, 12 species of stonefly, and about 17 moth species. Other invertebrates include some 18 species of spider and a little over seven dozen species of cave-dwellers. The West Virginia Division of Wildlife (WVDNR) uses hunting and fishing license fees for wildlife habitat conservation. The state has guidelines for persons applying for West Virginia scientific collecting permits.

== Diversity, mountain & low land ==
Sphagnum with the carnivorous Sarracenia purpurea, also called the 'purple pitcher plant'.

As with West Virginia's remote mountain forests, the farms and lands with meadows and woodlots near urban areas also hold whitetail deer, chipmunks, raccoons, skunks, groundhogs, opossums, weasels, field mice, flying squirrels, cotton-tail rabbits, gray foxes, red foxes, gray squirrels, red squirrels and a cave bat to name a few. Bobcats, snowshoe hares, wild boars and black bears are not strictly found in deepest forests and parks of West Virginia. But, the mink, beaver and at one time the eastern cougar (Puma concolor couguar) are very rarely seen near farms, even the farthest from towns.

Deep in the heart of the state's mountains is a unique natural botanical treasure. Along with very rare boreal plants, several species of orchids and carnivorous plants are found at Cranberry Glades Botanical Area. It provides a chance for the public to see mink, beavers, snowshoe hare, black bear with its unique flora and other fauna. Cranberry Glades is the southernmost breeding pocket for some northern breeding species of birds like the purple finch and the northern waterthrush. West Virginia's western valley contrasts the mountains with another natural treasure, the Ohio River Islands National Wildlife Refuge. These islands serves as a habitat for great blue heron, wood ducks, cormorants, Canada geese, migrating loons, and tundra swans.

== Varieties ==
=== Mammals ===
The state of West Virginia is currently home to at least 70 wild mammal species. The larger megafauna which once inhabited the High Alleghenies — elk, bison, mountain lion — were all exterminated during the 19th century. They survived longer in this area, however, than in other parts of the eastern United States. Naturalist John James Audubon reported that by 1851 a few eastern elk (Cervus canadensis canadiensis) could still be found in the Allegheny Mountains of what became West Virginia, but that by then they were virtually gone from the remainder of their range.

Mammals in the region today include whitetail deer, chipmunk, raccoon, skunk, groundhog, opossum, weasel, field mouse, flying squirrel, cottontail rabbit, gray foxes, red foxes, gray squirrels, red squirrels and several types of bat. Bobcat, snowshoe hare, and black bear are also found in the more remote forests and parks. Mink and beaver are much less often seen. Four species (or subspecies) – the Virginia big-eared bat, the Indiana bat, the West Virginia northern flying squirrel and the (potentially extirpated) eastern cougar – are federally listed as endangered. Several additional species are rare in the state and warrant close monitoring.

Some West Virginia mammals have thrived despite human disturbance, including the opossum, which is more abundant and more widely distributed due to human activities. Also doing well are mammals that prefer farm and early successional habitats. The coyote is expanding its range eastward in the United States and now occurs throughout the state. A small wild boar population does inhabit the a small region in the southern end of the state, but these were released by the state in 1971 primarily to serve as a big game hunting opportunity.

Many examples of West Virginia's present and former megafauna are on display at the West Virginia State Wildlife Center, a small zoo featuring native animals.

=== Birds ===
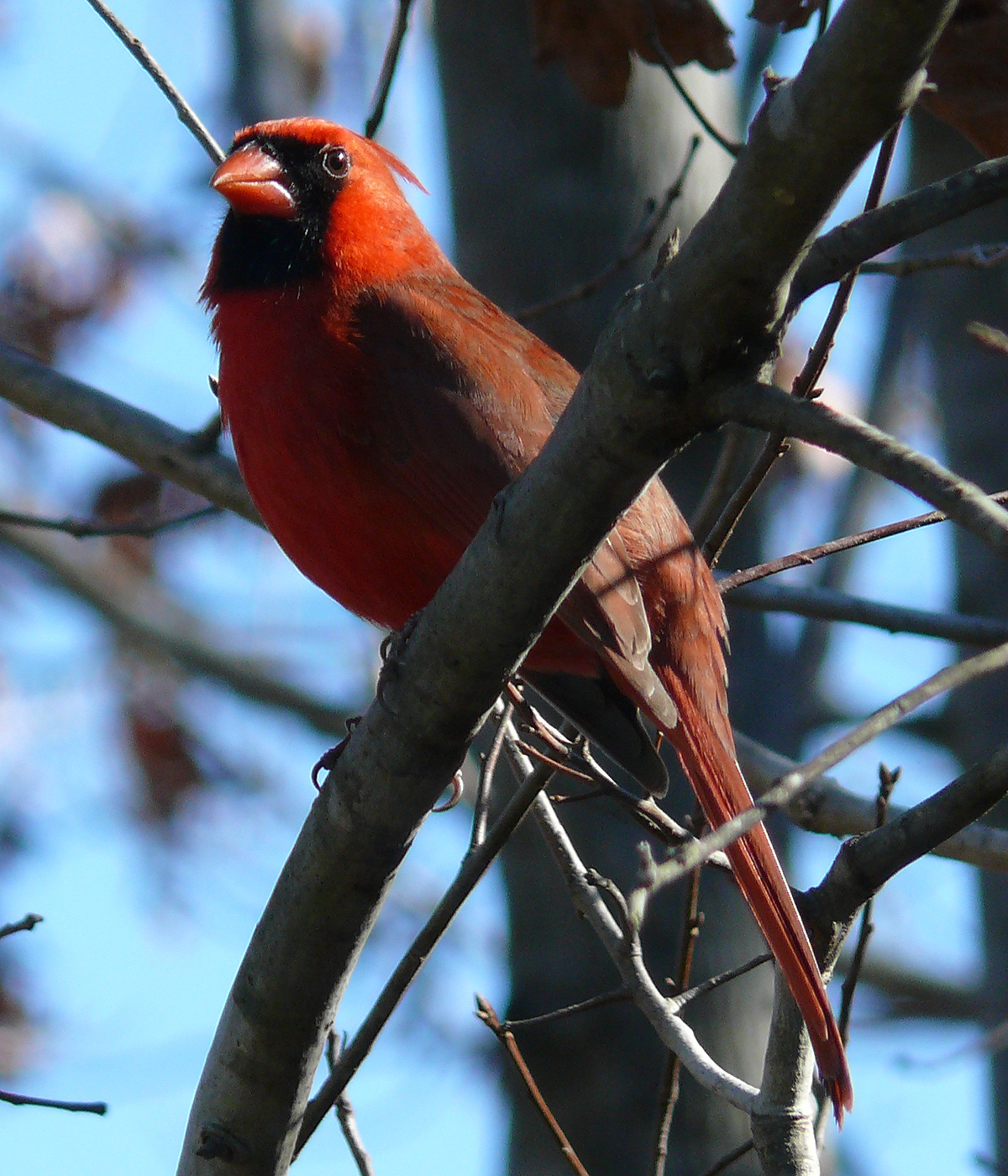
The cardinal is West Virginia's state bird.

North American migrant birds such as the tufted titmouse, scarlet tanager, brown thrasher, American robin, and humming bird live throughout the warmer seasons, except in the highest peaks. Some Icterid birds visit West Virginia, as well as the hermit thrush and wood thrush. The American goldfinch, northern cardinal, bluejay, catbird, northern mockingbird, American sparrow, some wrens, and even crows can be found passing through urban lawns to meadows and cattail ponds or a farmer's field.

Major game birds are the duck, goose, bobwhite quail, ruffed grouse, and wild turkey. Pairs of turkey vultures can be seen while driving along the open highway. The sandhill crane lumbers at flight over the large rivers to conservation ponds. Occasionally, osprey and golden eagle can be found watching over or snatching a fish on remote lakes and larger streams. Hawks and owls are the most common birds of prey.

=== Reptiles ===
West Virginia has over twenty species of lizard, skink, turtle, and snake. While the moccasin can be seen crossing over brooks and along larger rivers, the timber rattlesnake is found among rocks and fallen tree in the highland forests and mountainous areas. The copperhead is the most common venomous snake throughout the state.

Green Snakes, Rat or Barn Snakes and Garden Snakes are examples of non-venomous snakes seen across the hollows and wide bottoms along the major rivers, sharing habitat with the copperhead. Painted turtles live in most ponds and brooks. These and major rivers also hold snapping turtles, hunted as a delicacy with a WVDNR permit. The box turtle is found in nearly every meadow and wood.

Family: Colubridae includes:
Queen snake, common water-snake, northern brownsnake, northern red-bellied snake, common ribbonsnake, eastern gartersnake, eastern smooth earthsnake, mountain earthsnake, eastern hog-nosed snake, northern ring-necked snake, eastern wormsnake, northern black racer, rough greensnake, smooth greensnake, cornsnake, black ratsnake, northern pinesnake, eastern kingsnake, black kingsnake, eastern milksnake

Family: Viperidae includes:
Northern copperhead (Agkistrodon contortrix), timber rattlesnake.

=== Fish ===
The Mountain State's water habitat holds 24 families of fish, including mudminnows, trout, trout-perches, killifish, livebearers, silversides, sticklebacks, sculpins, Temperate basses, sunfish, perches, drums, lampreys, sturgeons, paddlefish, gars, bowfins, mooneyes, freshwater eels, herrings, minnows, carp, suckers, freshwater catfish, and pikes. The three hybrid sport fish are the Hybrid Striped Bass (Morone chrysops x M. saxatilis), Hybrid Saugeye (Stizostedion canadense x S. vitreum) and Hybrid Tiger Musky (Esox lucius x E. masquinony). With the exception of a small portion of the New River in Virginia, the candy darter is found exclusively in West Virginia.

During the early half of the 20th century, the West Virginia Department of Resources accidentally hatched a somewhat golden rainbow trout. This excitement in the state hatchery fueled the effort to produce the West Virginia "golden rainbow trout." Some anglers claim the state received a golden trout from the west to help culture this. Just the same, today's "goldy" was developed from breeding-back to rainbow trout. As the case may be expected, these special fish are very aggressive fighters and excellent tablefare.

Various water habitats of West Virginia hold the following sport fish:
American eel, black crappie, bluegill, brook trout, brown trout, bullhead catfish, burbot, channel catfish, flathead catfish, freshwater drum, green sunfish, hybrid striped bass, lake trout, largemouth bass, longear sunfish, muskellunge, northern pike, pumpkinseed, rainbow trout, redear sunfish, rock bass, sauger, saugeye, smallmouth bass, spotted bass, striped bass, walleye, warmouth, white bass, white crappie, white perch and yellow perch.

A partial list of non-game fish follows:
eastern blacknose dace, bluntnose minnow, bigmouth buffalo, black redhorse, bowfin, brook silverside, brook stickleback, buffalo, carp, creek chub, central stoneroller, channel darter, emerald shiner, fathead minnow, gizzard shad, golden redhorse, golden shiner, grass carp, grass pickerel, greenside darter, johnny darter, leastbrook lamprey, logperch darter, longnose gar, mosquitofish, northern hogsucker, paddlefish, quillback, pugnose minnow, rainbow darter, shovelnose sturgeon (Ohio River), silver lamprey, silver jaw minnow, southern redbelly dace, stonecat, striped shiner, sturgeon, trout-perch, western banded killfish and white sucker.

=== Amphibians ===
Amphibian species in West Virginia number about twenty one. Among them are hellbenders and salamanders, as well as toads and frogs such as the northern leopard frog and mountain chorus frog.

=== Insects ===
Many common insects of the Eastern United States can be found in West Virginia including aquatic insects. The state's beetle number about 15 species. There are more than 70 species of odonate, about 18 species of spiders and a dozen species of stonefly. There are about 17 moth species. Of the wasps, some meadows may have a burrow of yellowjackets. The forest can hold a hive of hornets hanging from a branch. Sweat bee and mosquito are no stranger to the shaded wet-land which delights the sunfish and catfish in nearby deeper pools. West Virginia trout has but one mayfly on which to feed. It is the West Virginia burrowing mayfly (Ephemera triplex) along with the mountain stream's terrestrials and the other insects. The Mountain State's warmer season's flora glitter with about two and a half dozen species of butterfly.

=== Other invertebrates ===
Gastropoda, slugs, leech, earthworms and grub worm otherwise larvae are among the common invertebrates in West Virginia. The state's streams and lakes provides habitat for about 54 species of mussel which are protected from harvest by WVDNR.

Crayfish amount to eight different species in the stream both above and below ground. The cave crayfish (Cambarus nerterius) is endemic to caves within the Greenbrier and Elk River drainages in West Virginia for example. There are a little over seven dozen cave invertebrate in the state. Of these to example, the Madison Cave isopod (Antrolana lira) has a conservation threatened ranking priority one and lives on the Shenandoah and Potomac rivers area.

There are eleven species of land snails. The flat-spired three-toothed land snail (Triodopsis platysayoides) is listed as a threatened priority one according to the U.S. Fish and Wildlife Service. A recent estimate has only 84 of these snails living on the Cheat Mountain Watershed.

== See also ==
- Fauna of the United States
