= Cave catfish =

Cave catfish is a name used for species of catfish that live in caves or underground environments.

Species known specifically as cave catfish include:

- Clarias cavernicola (Namibia)
- Horaglanis krishnai (India)

== Other catfish that live in caves ==
- Prietella species (Mexico)
- Trogloglanis pattersoni (USA)
- Satan eurystomus (USA)
- Trichomycterus itacarambiensis (Brazil), from the Trichomycteridae family
