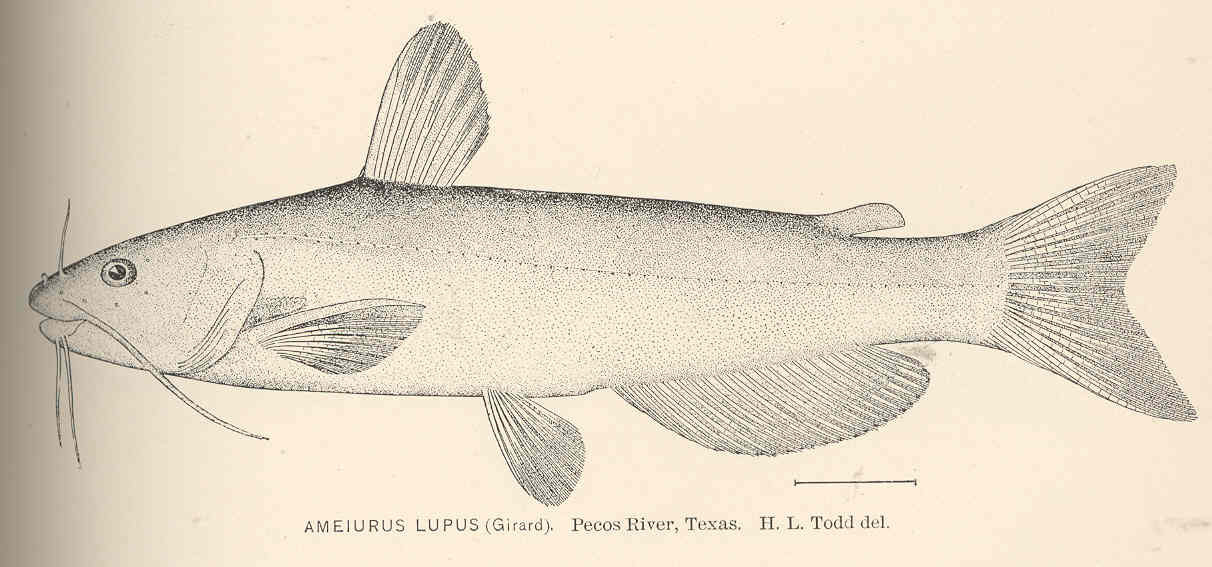

Conservation status
- Data Deficient (IUCN 3.1)

- Vulnerable (NatureServe)

Scientific classification
- Kingdom: Animalia
- Phylum: Chordata
- Class: Actinopterygii
- Order: Siluriformes
- Family: Ictaluridae
- Genus: Ictalurus
- Species: I. lupus

Binomial name
- Ictalurus lupus (Girard, 1858)

Synonyms
- Pimelodus lupus Girard, 1858

= Ictalurus lupus =

Species of fish

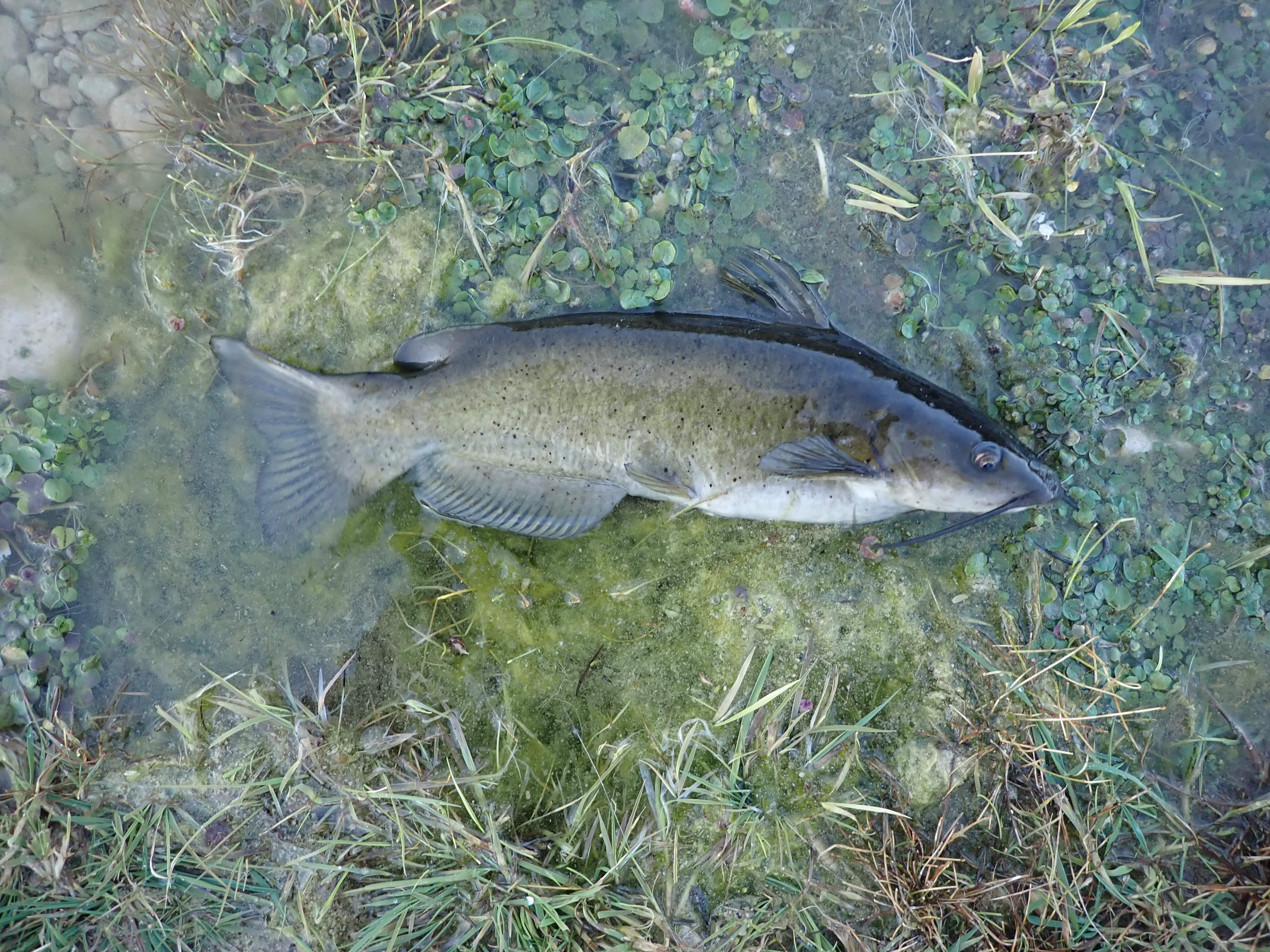
Headwater Catfish

Ictalurus lupus (the bagre lobo or headwater catfish) is a species of catfish in the family Ictaluridae. It resembles the closely related channel catfish (Ictalurus punctatus), but is smaller, lacks spots, and has a caudal fin with a shallower fork, and grows to a total length of 48 cm (19 in). It is found in Northeastern Mexico and the Southwestern United States.
