= Prietella lundbergi =

Phantom blindcat

Conservation status
- Vulnerable (IUCN 3.1)

Scientific classification
- Kingdom: Animalia
- Phylum: Chordata
- Class: Actinopterygii
- Order: Siluriformes
- Family: Ictaluridae
- Genus: Prietella
- Species: P. lundbergi

Binomial name
- Prietella lundbergi S. J. Walsh & C. R. Gilbert, 1995

Species of fish

Prietella lundbergi (phantom blindcat) is a species of North American freshwater catfish (family Ictaluridae) endemic to Mexico. It is a troglobitic species found in caves of the Tamesi River drainage. This species grows to a length of 4.5 centimetres (1.8 in) SL.
