= Prietella =

Scientific classification
- Kingdom: Animalia
- Phylum: Chordata
- Class: Actinopterygii
- Division: Teleostei
- Order: Siluriformes
- Family: Ictaluridae
- Genus: Prietella; Carranza, 1954

Type species
- Prietella phreatophila Carranza, 1954

Genus of fishes

Prietella is a small genus of North American freshwater catfishes found in Mexico and Texas, and restricted to underground waters.

== Taxonomy ==
Prietella has been confirmed to be monophyletic and to be the sister group of the Noturus. The karyotype of P. phreatophila is indistinguishable from one of the genus Noturus; however, its diploid number of 50 chromosomes differs from the proposed ancestral Noturus karyotype of 54–56 chromosomes. However, this relationship has not been supported by preliminary mitochondrial DNA sequence data. Despite similarity to other cave-dwelling species of Ictaluridae, they are not closely related.

== Species ==
There are currently two recognized species in this genus:

- Prietella lundbergi S. J. Walsh & C. R. Gilbert, 1995 (Phantom blindcat)
- Prietella phreatophila Carranza, 1954 (Mexican blindcat)

== Distribution and habitat ==
The distribution of Prietella now is known to extend from the very northern part of the Mexican state of Coahuila, very near the international boundary, to the southernmost part of the state of Tamaulipas, 750 kilometres (470 mi) away to the southeast. The distribution of P. lundbergi is very restricted; P. lundbergi is known from two springs of the Tamesí River drainage in the state of Tamaulipas. P. phreatophila has a greater distribution than P. lundbergi; P. phreatophila originates from the Bravo River basin, Coahuila, from near Múzquiz northward to about 50 km (31 mi) southwest of Ciudad Acuña and to near Allende, Coahuila. In 2016, P. phreatophila was confirmed from the U.S. state of Texas, near the Mexican border. Both species occupy different Gulf of Mexico drainages and are separated by about 600 km (370 mi).

P. lundbergi is a cave-restricted species. P. phreatophila occurs in wells. Most Phreatophila have been found well in habitats that likely have relatively little short-term fluctuation in environmental parameters. For the most part, they are found in still pools; they have never been seen in shallow running water. Often they are associated with a silt substrate.

== Description ==
Like other cave species of catfish including the ictalurids Trogloglanis pattersoni and Satan eurystomus, Prietella species lack pigmentation and eyes and have a reduced lateral line. In Prietella, the lateral line is more reduced than in other members of the subfamily; after the gill opening, it is reduced to three or fewer pores. P. lundbergi differs from P. phreatophila by a number of characteristics including a reduced or absent swimbladder, a more emarginate to weakly forked caudal fin, and a more deeply notched adipose fin. P. lundbergi grows to about 4.5 centimetres (1.8 in) SL.

== Behavior ==
Jaw-locking behaviors have been observed in P. phreatophila. Fish that have been presumed to be males when first coming in contact with each other will engage in this behavior that is thought to establish a social dominance hierarchy. Jaw-locking usually lasts less than 30 minutes but has been recorded to last for many hours. The dominance relationships are long-term; the same two fish usually do not engage in this behavior again.

P. phreatophila may lie motionless or drift in the current with their breathing slowed. Though they may be awakened by disturbances, this behavior is likely due to lack of predators in their habitat as this behavior would likely leave them extremely vulnerable to predation.

== Relationship to humans ==
Trade of P. phreatophila is restricted in Germany.

Both species of Prietella are on the IUCN Red List. P. lundergi is a vulnerable species, and P. phreatophila is an endangered species. P. phreatophila is threatened by groundwater pollution and overfishing. It has been noted that P. phreatophila should be considered a threatened species due to being found in more localities than previously thought and recommended that P. lundbergi be considered endangered due to its extreme rarity.
