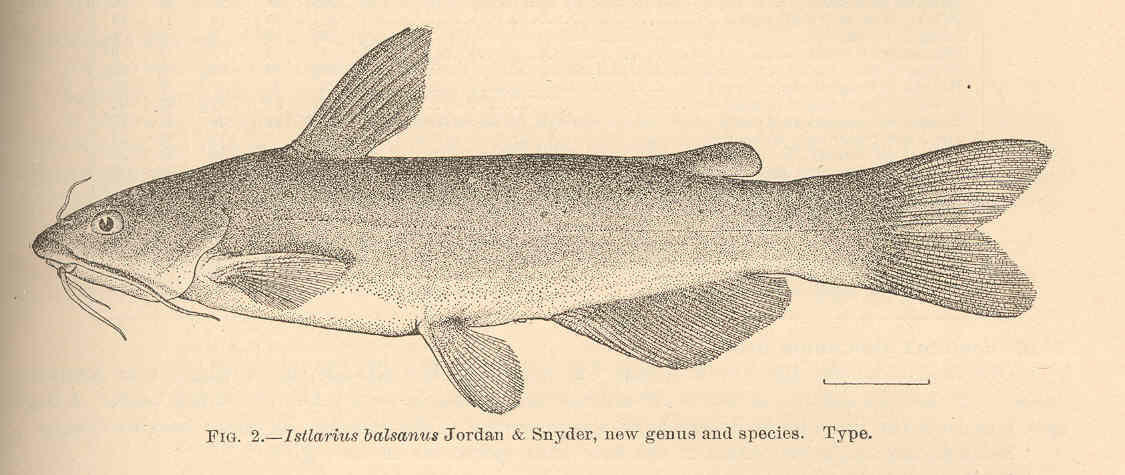

Scientific classification
- Kingdom: Animalia
- Phylum: Chordata
- Class: Actinopterygii
- Order: Siluriformes
- Family: Ictaluridae
- Genus: Ictalurus
- Species: I. balsanus

Binomial name
- Ictalurus balsanus (Jordan & Snyder, 1899)

Synonyms
- Istlarius balsanus (Jordan & Snyder, 1899), Istlarius balsanus occidentalis (de Buen, 1946)

= Ictalurus balsanus =

Species of fish

Ictalurus balsanus (the Balsas catfish) is found in the Rio Balsas drainage, which it is named after. The Balsas catfish is at threat from the introduced Channel catfish. The first measurements taking of Ictalurus balsanus showed that the catfish is between 10 and 60 centimeters.
