= Rio Verde catfish =

Conservation status
- Vulnerable (IUCN 3.1)

Scientific classification
- Kingdom: Animalia
- Phylum: Chordata
- Class: Actinopterygii
- Order: Siluriformes
- Family: Ictaluridae
- Genus: Ictalurus
- Species: I. mexicanus

Binomial name
- Ictalurus mexicanus (Meek, 1904)

Synonyms
- Amiurus mexicanus Meek, 1904

Species of fish

The Rio Verde catfish (Ictalurus mexicanus) is a species of North American freshwater catfish endemic to the Pánuco River basin (notably Rio Verde) in San Luis Potosí, Mexico.
