= Ictalurus dugesii =

Lerma catfish

Scientific classification
- Kingdom: Animalia
- Phylum: Chordata
- Class: Actinopterygii
- Order: Siluriformes
- Family: Ictaluridae
- Genus: Ictalurus
- Species: I. dugesii

Binomial name
- Ictalurus dugesii (T. H. Bean, 1880)

Synonyms
- Amiurus dugèsii (Bean, 1880)

Species of catfish

Ictalurus dugesii (the Lerma catfish) is found in Mexico's Rio Lerma and Rio Ameca drainages.
