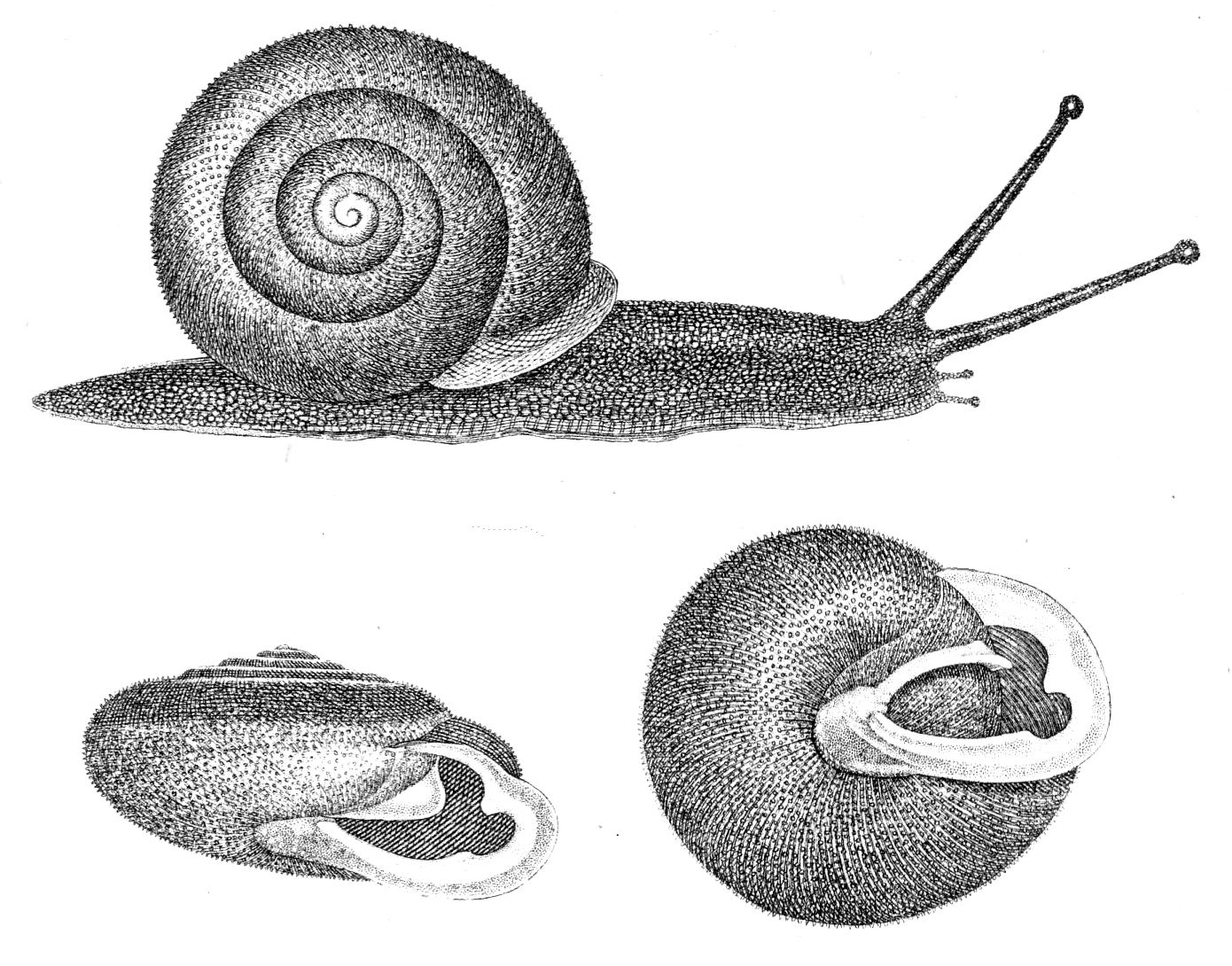
- Xolotrema notatum from W. G. Binney, 1878

Scientific classification
- Domain: Eukaryota
- Kingdom: Animalia
- Phylum: Mollusca
- Class: Gastropoda
- Order: Stylommatophora
- Family: Polygyridae
- Subfamily: Triodopsinae
- Tribe: Triodopisini
- Genus: Xolotrema; Rafinesque, 1819

= Xolotrema =

Genus of gastropods

Xolotrema is a genus (or subgenus under Triodopsis) of air-breathing land snails, terrestrial pulmonate gastropod molluscs in the family Polygyridae.

== Shell description ==
Pilsbry (1940) characterized the shell of Xolotrema (which he considered to be a subgenus) thus:

"Triodopses, in which the inner margin of the basal lip has a long bladelike lamella, terminating at a notch where it joins the outer arc of the lip; the embryonic whorls are covered with close retractive radial striae (subobsolete in T. fosteri)."

== Species ==
Species within the genus Xolotrema include:

- Xolotrema carolinensis
- Xolotrema fosteri
- Xolotrema notatum
- Xolotrema obstricta
