= Ictalurus nazas =

Scientific classification
- Kingdom: Animalia
- Phylum: Chordata
- Class: Actinopterygii
- Division: Teleostei
- Order: Siluriformes
- Family: Ictaluridae
- Genus: Ictalurus
- Species: I. nazas

Binomial name
- Ictalurus nazas Avila-Treviño et al., 2025

Species of fish

Ictalurus nazas is a species of freshwater catfish in the family Ictaluridae, endemic to the endorheic (closed‑basin) drainage system of the Nazas–Aguanaval basin in Durango, Mexico.

== Distribution ==
Ictalurus nazas is found exclusively in the Nazas‑Aguanaval basin, particularly in the Peñón Blanco and Ramos rivers in the state of Durango, Mexico. It inhabits slow-moving waters with temperatures ranging from about 17 to 22 °C (63 to 72 °F). These waters feature exposed rocky surfaces and crevices, which the fish uses as shelter.

== Description ==
It has an elongated body, with a relatively large head that is flattened ventrally. It has eight barbels: four maxillary, two nasal, and two premaxillary; the premaxillary barbels are short, reaching only the posterior edge of the operculum. The dorsal fin has 5 to 7 rays; the pectoral fins have 7 to 9; the pelvic fins typically have 7 to 8 rays; and the anal fin has 16 to 19 rays. The caudal fin is moderately forked, with a rounded “U”-shaped edge.

Its body is olive-green with dark spots and a black border on the caudal fin. It differs from I. pricei by having a lower number of anal fin rays (16 to 19 vs. 19 to 24), shorter premaxillary barbels, a proportionally shorter base of the anal, pectoral, and pelvic fins in relation to the standard length, and fewer, less developed serrations on the pectoral spine, which are restricted to the distal end of the spine.
