= I. australis =

I. australis may refer to:

- Ictalurus australis, the bagre del panuco, a fish species endemic to Mexico
- Ichthyococcus australis, the Southern lightfish, a fish species
- Icichthys australis, the southern driftfish or ragfish, a medusafish species found around the world in all southern oceans
- Indigofera australis, the Australian indigo, a leguminous shrub species

== See also ==
- Australis (disambiguation)
