= Powerton Lake State Fish and Wildlife Area =

State park in Illinois, USA

- IUCN category V (protected landscape/seascape)
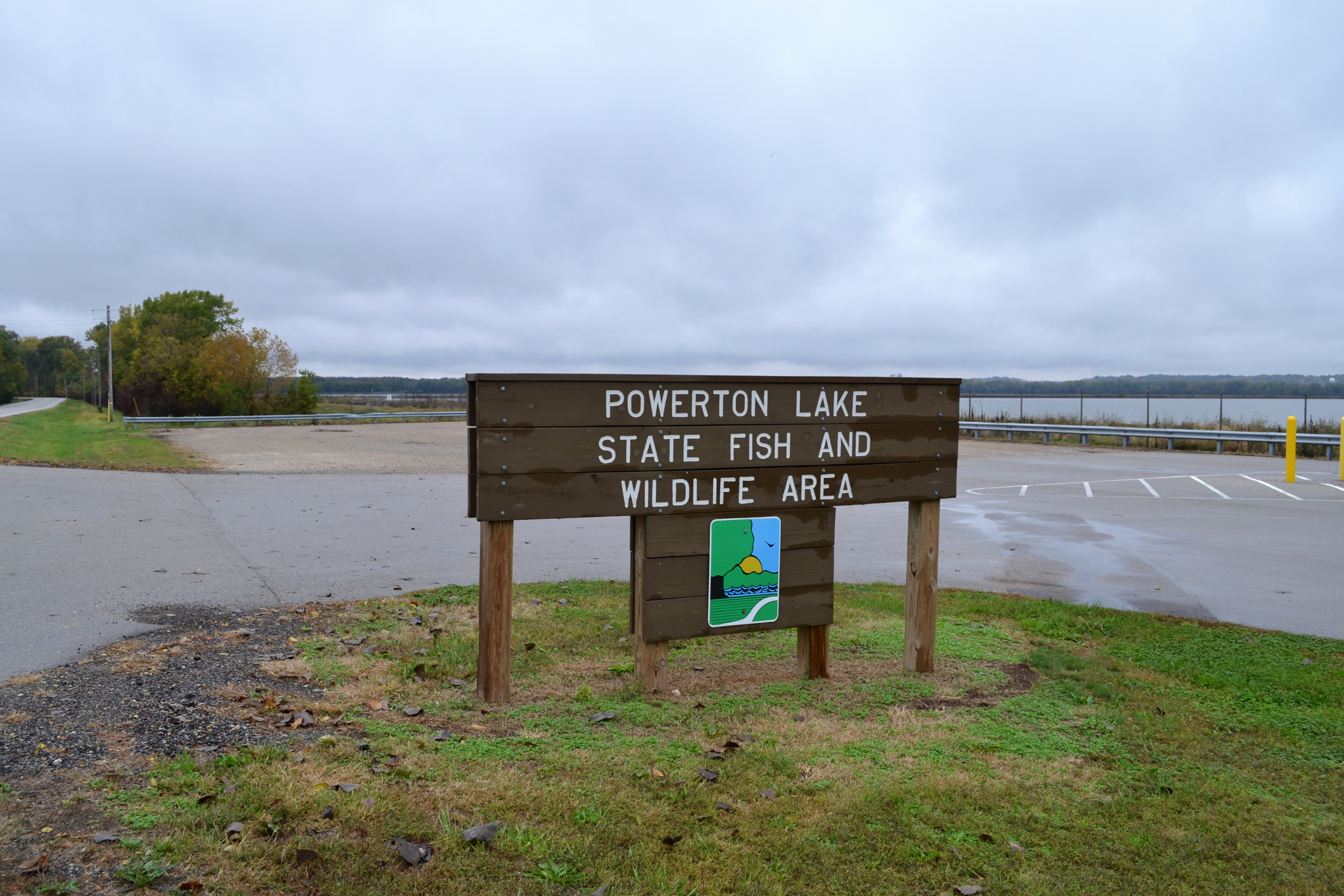

- Location within Illinois Location within the United States
- Location: Tazewell County, Illinois
- Nearest city: Pekin, Illinois
- Coordinates: 40.549°N 89.704°W
- Area: 1,426 acres (5.77 km^{2})
- Governing body: Illinois Department of Natural Resources

Powerton Lake State Fish and Wildlife Area is a 1,426-acre (577 ha) area of semi-protected habitat on the Illinois River southwest of to the city of Pekin, Illinois within Tazewell County in the U.S. state of Illinois. The parcel is a cooling reservoir owned by NRG Energy, an electric power generating firm, and is operated by the Illinois Department of Natural Resources (IDNR). The lake is used for fishing, with an emphasis on blue catfish. In addition, IDNR states that approximately 60% of the cooling pond is used for duck and goose hunting during legal hunting seasons. The remaining 40% of the pond is maintained as a waterfowl refuge on a year-round basis.

== Description ==
Powerton Lake is adjacent to the Illinois River. The low-lying Illinois River's wetland bed is only partly suitable (at best) for agriculture, and large strips of the riverbank have been used for other purposes. The lake is heavily engineered to protect the power plant and other stretches of lake shoreline. Three causeway strips extend from the mainland out into the lake. The causeways divide the lake into four separate segments, preventing conditions of wind and storm from building up lake waves and eroding the shoreline. The Wildlife Area is managed as a disjunct site of the Spring Lake State Fish and Wildlife Area, a separate hunting preserve located near Manito, Illinois.

== History ==
The lake was constructed and filled in 1971 by Commonwealth Edison Company as a cooling pond. The Powerton cooling pond is an engineering element of Powerton Station, a 1,538-megawatt coal-fired plant sited adjacent to the southeast shore of the lake. Powerton Station was constructed in the 1930s, but expanded in 1971. The power station uses large quantities of water as part of its turbine operations, and due to water quality laws, needed a way to cool the heat exchanger instead of using the Illinois River. The lake was built in an extended rectangle shape with a maximum depths of 18 feet and an average depth of approximately 8 feet. It has 1,426 acres (577 ha) of water. Water flows from the plant to the east through a series of baffles and turns over approximately every 48 hours. It is a "perched" reservoir, surrounded by levees and built high to catch the wind to cool the water.

In 1983, the IDNR signed an agreement to lease the site for fishing and waterfowl hunting. The site opened to the public in September 1984, with a dedication ceremony on September 18, 1984.

== Fauna ==
=== Fish ===
Due to the warm water created by the power plant, fish grow quickly but reproduction is negatively affected. Extreme summer temperatures have also negatively affected fish, killing so many fish in the summer of 2012 that the dead fish clogged an intake screen that it lowered the water level and the Powerton plant had to be shut down temporarily. In winter, water temperatures can range from 40 °F (4 °C) to 60 °F (16 °C).

In 2001, blue catfish from Arkansas were stocked into Powerton Lake. By 2011, some fish had grown to 50 lb (23 kg). The alligator gar stocked in 2011 have grown up to 60 in (1,500 mm) and 60 lb (27 kg). It is one of the top sites in Illinois for smallmouth fishing.

Other fish species include: striped bass hybrids, smallmouth bass, largemouth bass, white bass, gizzard shad, threadfin shad, bigmouth buffalo, bluegill, redear sunfish, carp, smallmouth buffalo, freshwater drum, brook silversides silver carp, green sunfish, pirate perch, shortnose gar, walleyes, crappies, and bighead carp.

=== Birds ===
Peoria Audubon Society has spotted over 179 species of birds at Powerton Lake. The most common species include: diving ducks, mallards, bald eagles, mergansers, buffleheads, and goldeneyes.

== Facilities ==
Powerton Lake State Fish and Wildlife Area has a parking area, a boat ramp, fencing, and toilets. There are no food, fuel, or services on site. There is no horsepower restriction.
