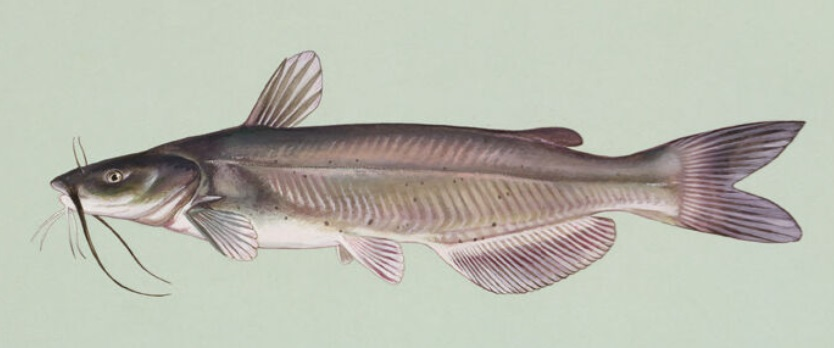
- channel catfish (Ictalurus punctatus)

Scientific classification
- Kingdom: Animalia
- Phylum: Chordata
- Class: Actinopterygii
- Order: Siluriformes
- Family: Ictaluridae
- Genus: Ictalurus; Rafinesque, 1820

Type species
- Silurus cerulescens Rafinesque, 1820

Synonyms
- Elliops Rafinesque, 1820; Synechoglanis Gill, 1859; Ichthaelurus Cope, 1868; Villarius Rutter, 1896; Haustor Jordan & Evermann, 1896; Istlarius Jordan & Snyder, 1899; Ichthyaelurus Meek, 1904

= Ictalurus =

Ictalurus Temporal range: Late Eocene to present

Genus of fishes

Ictalurus is a genus of North American freshwater catfishes. It includes the well-known channel catfish (Ictalurus punctatus) and blue catfish (Ictalurus furcatus).

The catfish genome database (cBARBEL) is a database for the genetics of Ictalurus species.

== Distribution ==
Members of this genus are primarily found in the Mississippi River basin & peninsular Florida, and range south to southern Mexico, where several range-restricted species are known. Some species, such as the channel and blue catfish, have been introduced to parts of North America west of the Rocky Mountains and east of the Appalachian Mountains, where they are otherwise not native. However, the fossil species Ictalurus countermani, known from the Miocene of Maryland, suggests that this genus did naturally inhabit the Atlantic-draining rivers east of the Appalachians during the Neogene.

== Species ==
Currently, 11 species in this genus are recognized:

- Ictalurus australis (Meek, 1904) (Panuco catfish)
- Ictalurus balsanus (D. S. Jordan & Snyder, 1899) (Balsas catfish)
- Ictalurus dugesii (T. H. Bean, 1880) (Lerma catfish)
- Ictalurus furcatus (Valenciennes, 1840) (blue catfish)
- Ictalurus lupus (Girard, 1858) (headwater catfish)
- Ictalurus meridionalis (Günther, 1864) (southern blue catfish)
- Ictalurus mexicanus (Meek, 1904) (Rio Verde catfish)
- Ictalurus nazas Avila-Treviño, Cardoza-Martínez, Alonzo-Rojo & Pérez-Rodríguez, 2025
- Ictalurus ochoterenai (F. de Buen, 1946) (Chapala catfish)
- Ictalurus pricei (Rutter, 1896) (Yaqui catfish)
- Ictalurus punctatus (Rafinesque, 1818) (channel catfish)

Five fossil species also are assigned to this genus:

- †Ictalurus countermani Lundberg & Luckenbill, 2012 (Late Miocene St. Mary's Formation of Maryland, US)
- †Ictalurus echinatus Lundberg, 1975 (Late Miocene/Early Pliocene Valentine Formation of Nebraska, US)
- †Ictalurus lambda Hubbs & Hibbard, 1951 - (Pliocene of Nebraska, Kansas, Texas and Florida, US)
- †Ictalurus rhaeas (Cope, 1891) (Late Eocene Cypress Hills Formation of Saskatchewan, Canada)
- †Ictalurus spodius Smith, 1987 (Pleistocene of Jalisco, Mexico)
