= Ictaluroidea =

Scientific classification
- Kingdom: Animalia
- Phylum: Chordata
- Class: Actinopterygii
- Order: Siluriformes
- Suborder: Siluroidei
- Superfamily: Ictaluroidea; T. N. Gill, 1861

Superfamily of fishes

The Ictaluroidea is a superfamily of catfish. As of 2000, the position of the Ictaluroidea within the Siluriformes order is not certain.

== Taxonomy ==
This superfamily consists of the following families:

- Family Ictaluridae, native to North America
- Family Cranoglanididae
