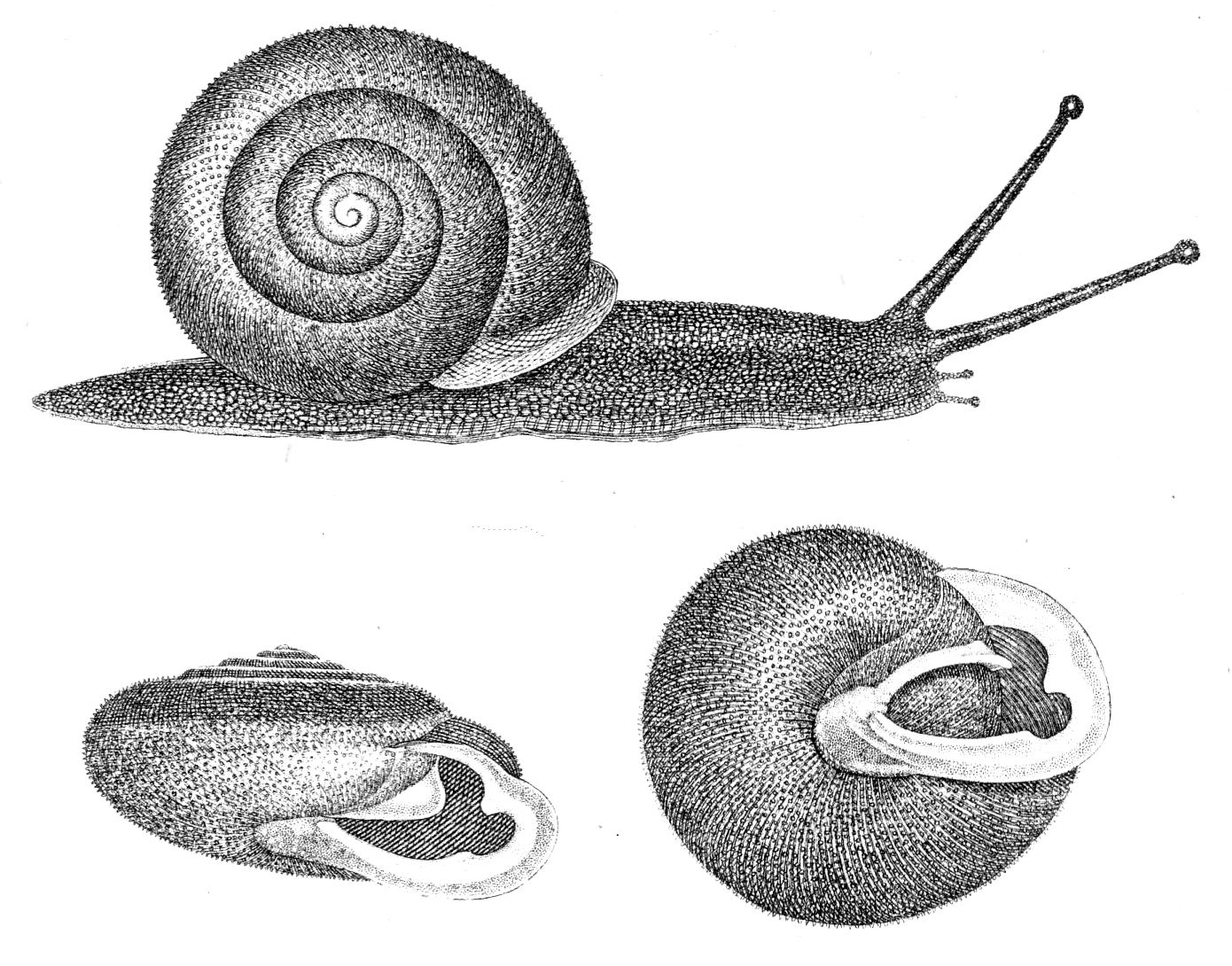
- Xolotrema notatum, live animal and two views of empty shell, from W. G. Binney, 1878

Scientific classification
- Kingdom: Animalia
- Phylum: Mollusca
- Class: Gastropoda
- Order: Stylommatophora
- Family: Polygyridae
- Genus: Xolotrema
- Species: X. notatum

Binomial name
- Xolotrema notatum (Deshayes, 1830)

= Xolotrema notatum =

Species of gastropod

Xolotrema notatum is a species of air-breathing land snail, a terrestrial pulmonate gastropod mollusk in the family Polygyridae.
