= Triodopsis burchi =

Conservation status
- Vulnerable (NatureServe)

Scientific classification
- Kingdom: Animalia
- Phylum: Mollusca
- Class: Gastropoda
- Order: Stylommatophora
- Family: Polygyridae
- Genus: Triodopsis
- Species: T. burchi

Binomial name
- Triodopsis burchi Hubricht, 1950

Synonyms
- Triodopsis tennesseensis burchi Hubricht, 1950; Triodopsis (Pilsbryorbis) burchi Hubricht, 1950

Species of gastropod

Triodopsis burchi, commonly known as the Pittsylvania threetooth, is a species of air-breathing land snail in the family of Polygyridae. It inhabits West Virginia, North Carolina, and Virginia.

The shell has three denticles, though they are not always present.
