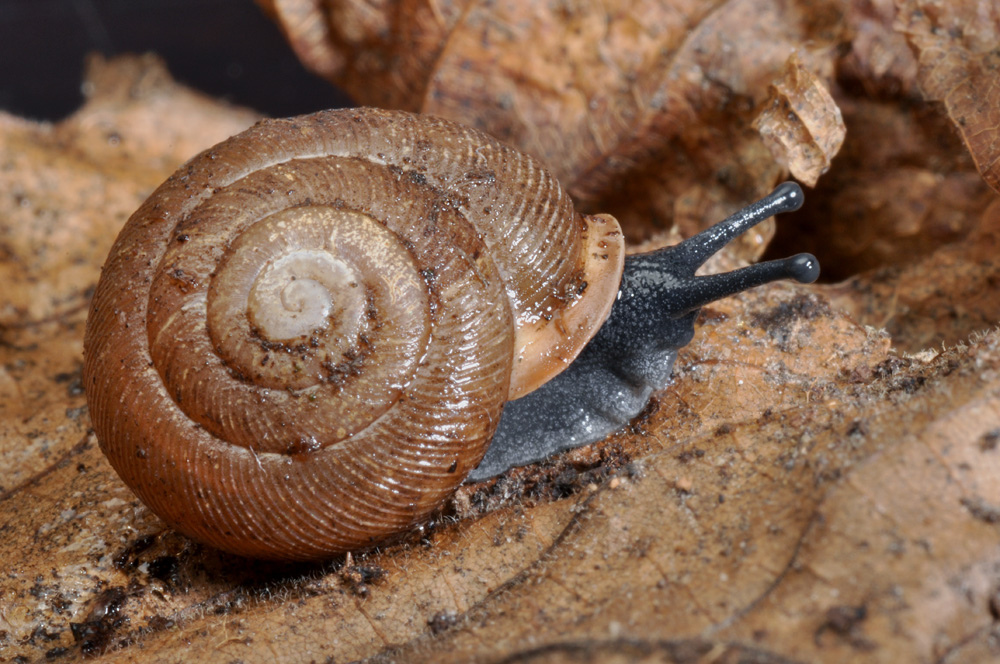
- A live individual of Triodopsis tridentata

Conservation status
- Secure (NatureServe)

Scientific classification
- Kingdom: Animalia
- Phylum: Mollusca
- Class: Gastropoda
- Order: Stylommatophora
- Family: Polygyridae
- Genus: Triodopsis
- Species: T. tridentata

Binomial name
- Triodopsis tridentata (Say, 1816)

= Triodopsis tridentata =

Species of gastropod

Triodopsis tridentata, common name the northern three-tooth or northern threetooth, is a species of air-breathing land snail, a terrestrial pulmonate gastropod mollusk in the family Polygyridae.
