= Cranoglanis henrici =

Conservation status
- Least Concern (IUCN 3.1)

Scientific classification
- Kingdom: Animalia
- Phylum: Chordata
- Class: Actinopterygii
- Order: Siluriformes
- Family: Cranoglanididae
- Genus: Cranoglanis
- Species: C. henrici

Binomial name
- Cranoglanis henrici (Vaillant, 1893)

Synonyms
- Anopleutropius henrici Vaillant, 1893

Species of fish

Cranoglanis henrici is a species of armorhead catfish from China and Vietnam where it is only known from the Red River drainage. This species reaches a length of about 29 centimetres (11 in) SL.
