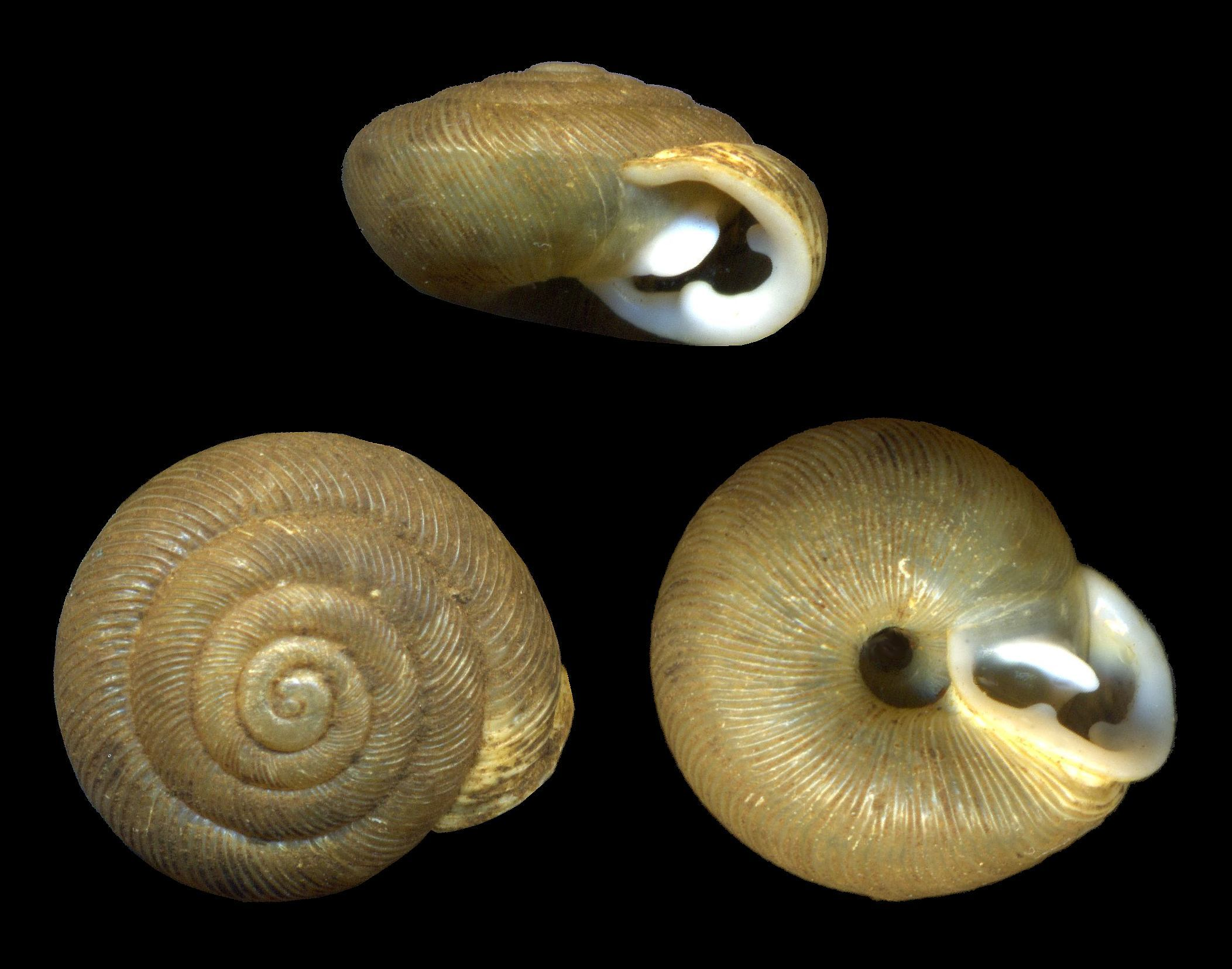
- Three views of a shell of Triodopsis hopetonensis

Conservation status
- Apparently Secure (NatureServe)

Scientific classification
- Kingdom: Animalia
- Phylum: Mollusca
- Class: Gastropoda
- Order: Stylommatophora
- Family: Polygyridae
- Genus: Triodopsis
- Species: T. hopetonensis

Binomial name
- Triodopsis hopetonensis (Shuttleworth, 1852)

= Triodopsis hopetonensis =

Species of gastropod

Triodopsis hopetonensis, common name the magnolia threetooth, is a species of air-breathing land snail, terrestrial pulmonate gastropod mollusk in the family Polygyridae.

== Ecology ==
=== Range ===
This snail is common in the Southeastern United States, its original native range being the coastal plains of the Mid-Atlantic. It ranges from Maryland to the south and west to Louisiana. It is rated by NatureServe as Apparently Secure in North Carolina and Kentucky, Vulnerable in Virginia and Tennessee, and Critically Imperiled in West Virginia.

=== Habitat ===
Found in moderately damp habitats, including in low wet woodlands, open grassy areas and urban settings, public waste areas, roadsides, in and under rotting logs, in scrap piles of construction lumber, and near salt or brackish water.

=== As invasive species ===
The species is spreading rapidly northward and eastward from its native range in the Mid-Atlantic coastal areas. It is being dispersed through construction lumber by humans to new urban areas. It is not native to Texas and according to the Texas Parks and Wildlife Department it is rapidly expanding in the east of the state, but its impact on native counterparts is not yet known
