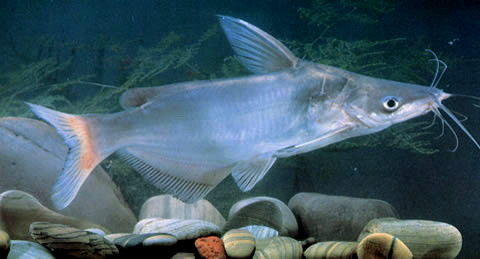
- Cranoglanis bouderius

Scientific classification
- Kingdom: Animalia
- Phylum: Chordata
- Class: Actinopterygii
- Order: Siluriformes
- Family: Cranoglanididae; G. S. Myers, 1931
- Genus: Cranoglanis; W. K. H. Peters, 1881

Type species
- Cranoglanis sinensis W. K. H. Peters, 1881

Synonyms
- Anopleutropius Vaillant, 1893; Pseudeutropichthys Koller, 1926

= Cranoglanis =

Genus of fishes

Cranoglanis is the only genus of armorhead catfishes.

== Taxonomy ==
Cranoglanis bouderius was first described as Bagrus bouderius in 1846 by John Richardson based on a Chinese watercolor painting. Wilhelm Peters later described Cranoglanis along with a new species, Cranoglanis sinensis. Otto Koller (1926) described a new species, Pseudotropichthys multiradiatus, which was synonymized with Cranoglanis by George Myers (1931), who also named the family Cranoglanididae. Jayaram (1955) synonymized C. multiradiatus and C. sinensis under C. bouderius.

The Cranoglanididae are closely related to the North American family Ictaluridae. These two families are sister taxa in the superfamily Ictaluroidea.

Cranoglanis has had a convoluted taxonomic history, at times having been considered a monotypic genus with C. bouderius as the only valid species. A 2026 analysis of DNA revealed two clades within the genus: Clade A inhabits the Pearl, Red, and Nandujiang drainage systems, while Clade B is restricted to the middle Xijiang system. The named species belong to Clade A, while Clade B is suggested to be an undescribed, cryptic species.

=== Species ===
The following species are recognized by FishBase:

- Cranoglanis bouderius (J. Richardson, 1846) – Guangdong
- Cranoglanis caolangensis V. H. Nguyễn, 2005
- Cranoglanis henrici (Vaillant, 1893) – Red River
- Cranoglanis multiradiatus (Koller, 1926) – Hainan
- Cranoglanis songhongensis V. H. Nguyễn, 2005

== Distribution and habitat ==
These fish are found in large freshwater rivers in China and Vietnam.

== Appearance and anatomy ==
These fish have short dorsal fins. The caudal fins are deeply forked. The eyes are large. Their bodies are scaleless, though rough, bony plates are located on the tops of their heads. These fish have four pairs of barbels.

== See also ==
- List of fish families
