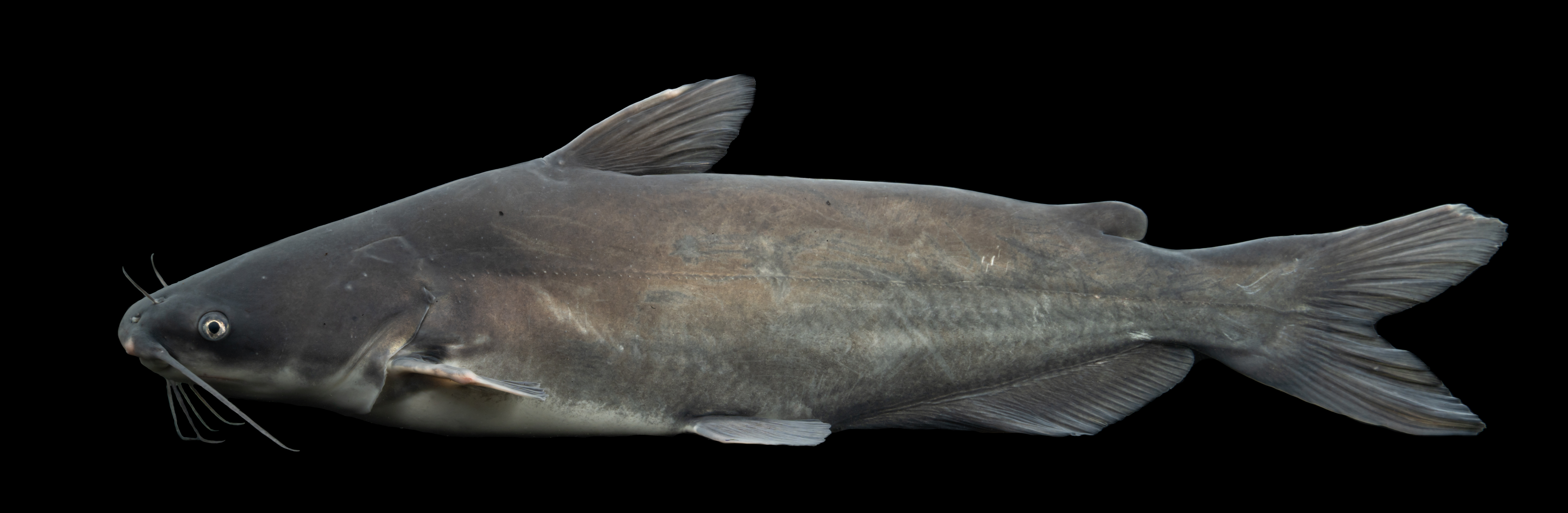

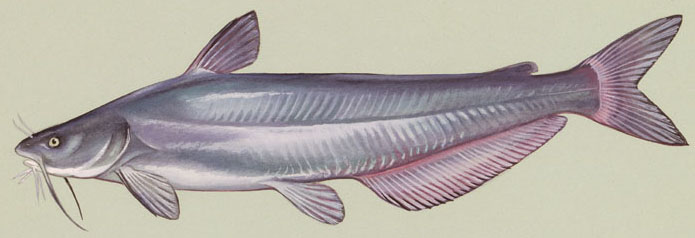

Conservation status
- Least Concern (IUCN 3.1)

Scientific classification
- Kingdom: Animalia
- Phylum: Chordata
- Class: Actinopterygii
- Division: Teleostei
- Order: Siluriformes
- Family: Ictaluridae
- Genus: Ictalurus
- Species: I. furcatus

Binomial name
- Ictalurus furcatus (Valenciennes, 1840)
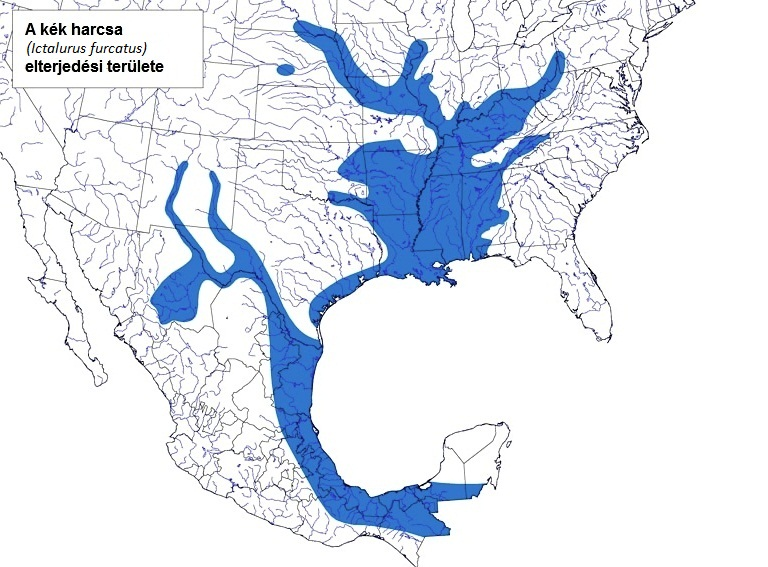
- Native distribution of Ictalurus furcatus

Synonyms
- Pimelodus furcatus Valenciennes, 1840; Pimelodus affinis Baird & Girard, 1854; Amiurus meridionalis Günther, 1864; Amiurus pondersosus Bean, 1880

= Blue catfish =

Species of fish

The blue catfish (Ictalurus furcatus) is a large species of North American catfish, reaching a length of 65 in (170 cm) and a weight of 143 lb (65 kg). The continent's largest catfish, it can live to 20 years, with a typical fish being between 25–46 in (64–117 cm) and 30–70 lb (14–32 kg). Native distribution is primarily in the Mississippi River and Louisiana drainage systems, including the Missouri, Ohio, Tennessee, and Arkansas Rivers, the Des Moines River in south-central Iowa, the Rio Grande, and south along the Gulf Coast to Belize and Guatemala.

An omnivorous predator, it has been introduced in a number of reservoirs and rivers, notably the Santee Cooper lakes of Lake Marion and Lake Moultrie in South Carolina, the James River in Virginia, Powerton Lake in Pekin, Illinois, and Lake Springfield in Springfield, Illinois. It is also found in some lakes in Florida.

The blue catfish can tolerate brackish water, and thus can colonize along inland waterways of coastal regions. It is considered invasive in some areas, particularly the Albemarle Sound and Chesapeake Bay.

== Evolution ==
The blue catfish is likely a direct descendant of Ictalurus lambda, a prehistoric catfish that inhabited the central and southern United States during the Pliocene. The bones of I. lambda very closely resemble those of I. furcatus aside from a few minor differences.

== Identification ==
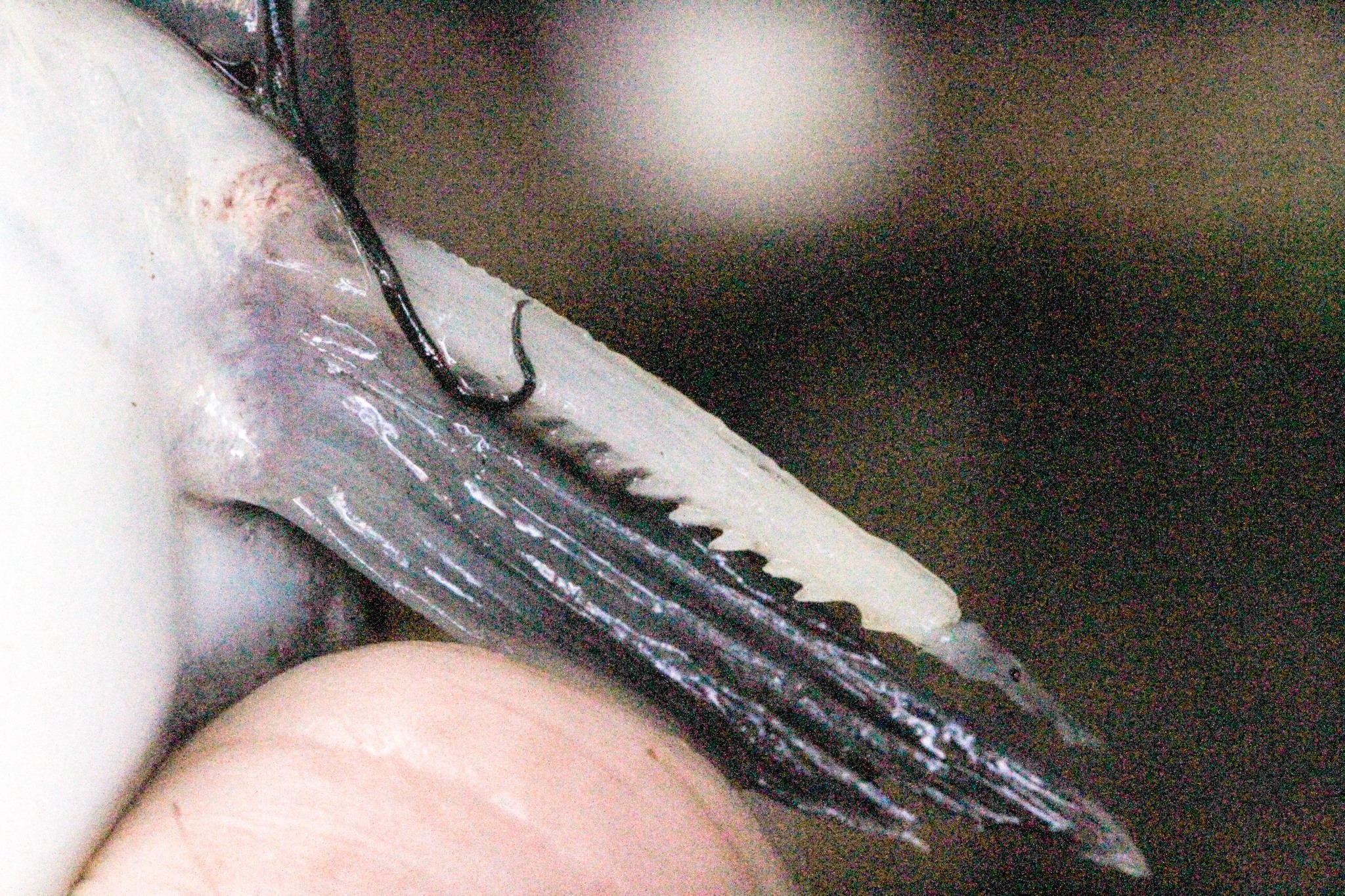
Showing the barbed pectoral fin spine

Blue catfish are often misidentified as channel catfish. Blue catfish are heavy bodied, blueish gray in color, and have a dorsal hump. The best way to tell the difference between a channel catfish and a blue catfish is to count the number of rays on the anal fin. A blue catfish has 30–36 rays, whereas a channel catfish has 25–29. Blue catfish also have barbels, a deeply forked tail, and a protruding upper jaw.

While adult blue catfish usually only grow to around two feet (0.61 m) they have been seen to grow up to at least five feet (1.5 m) in length and even weigh more than 100 pounds (45 kg).

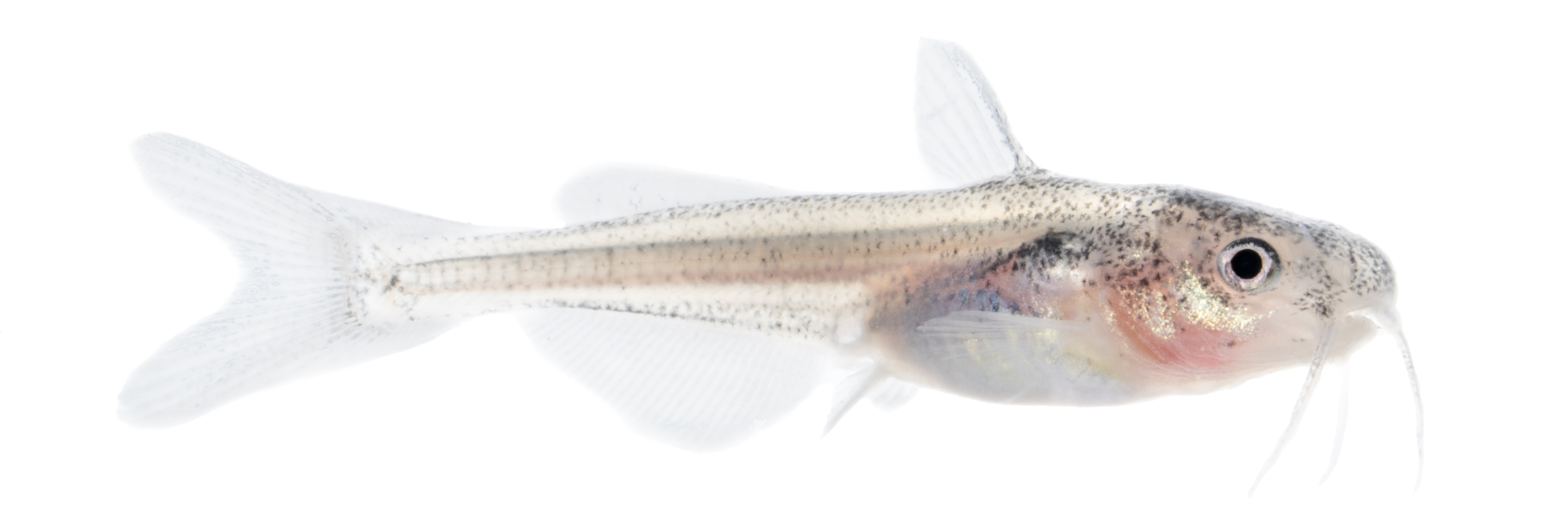
Fry

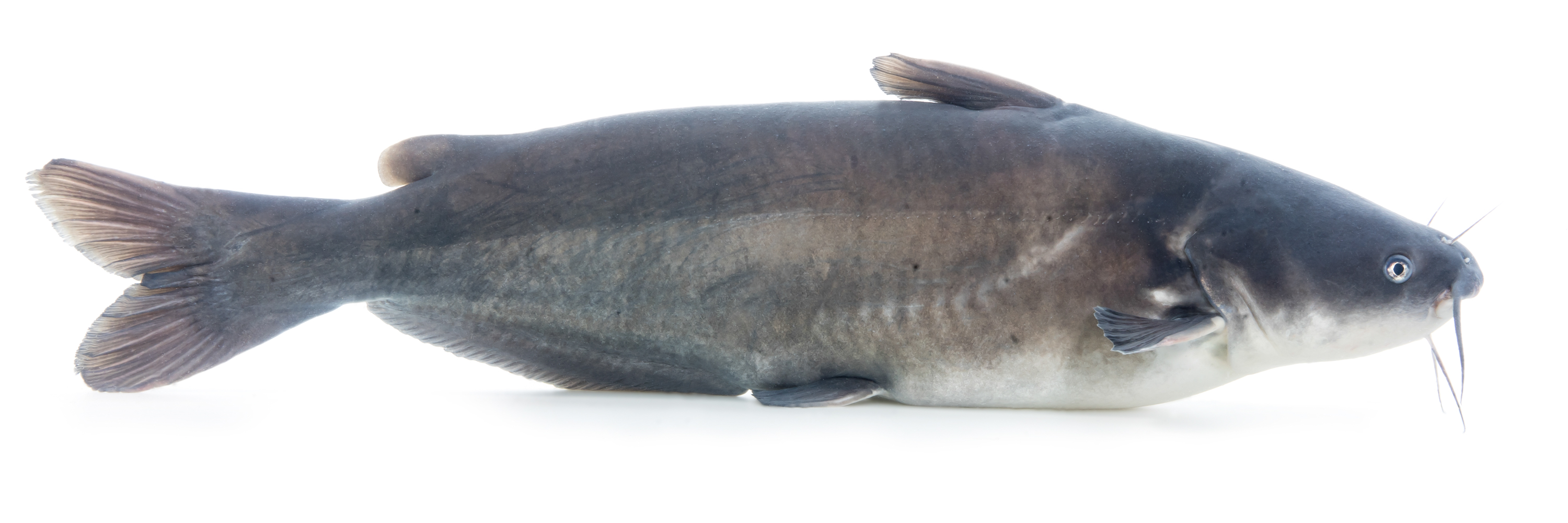
Adult

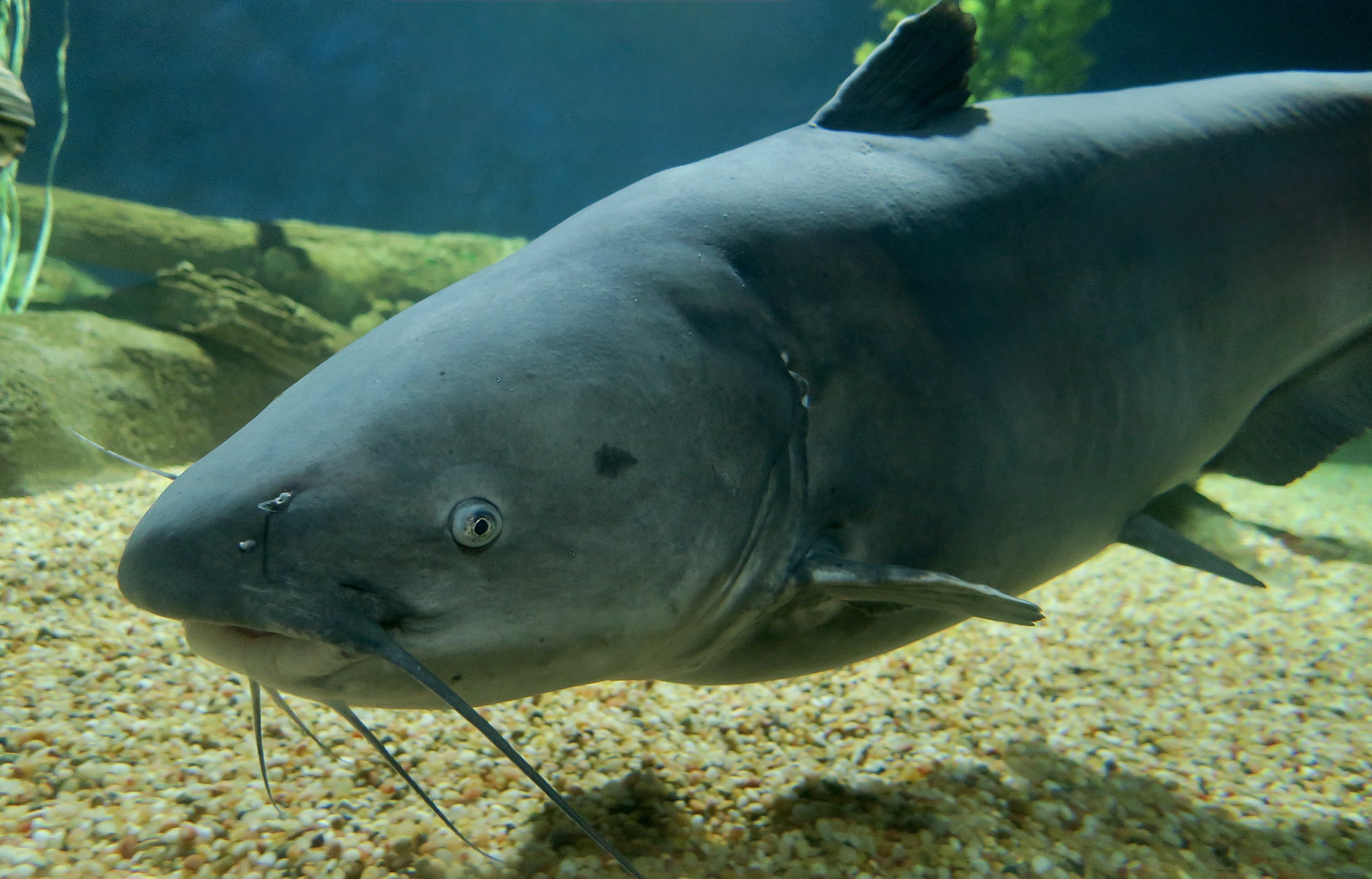
Blue catfish at OdySea Aquarium.

== Diet ==
The blue catfish is an opportunistic predator, eating any species of fish it can take (including cannibalism), along with insects, crawfish, crabs, freshwater mussels, clams, worms, frogs, and other readily available aquatic food sources.

The species is noted for taking injured fish beneath marauding schools of striped bass in open water in reservoirs, and feeding on wounded baitfish that have been washed through dam spillways or power-generation turbines. It is one of the few species of fish in the Mississippi River basin able to eat adult Asian carp.

== Population ==
The blue catfish are a highly productive species, spawning once a year from May to June. Females can produce 2,000 to 4,000 eggs per pound (0.45 kg) of body weight, meaning a 20-pound (9.1 kg) blue catfish can produce upwards of 40,000 eggs.

== As an invasive ==
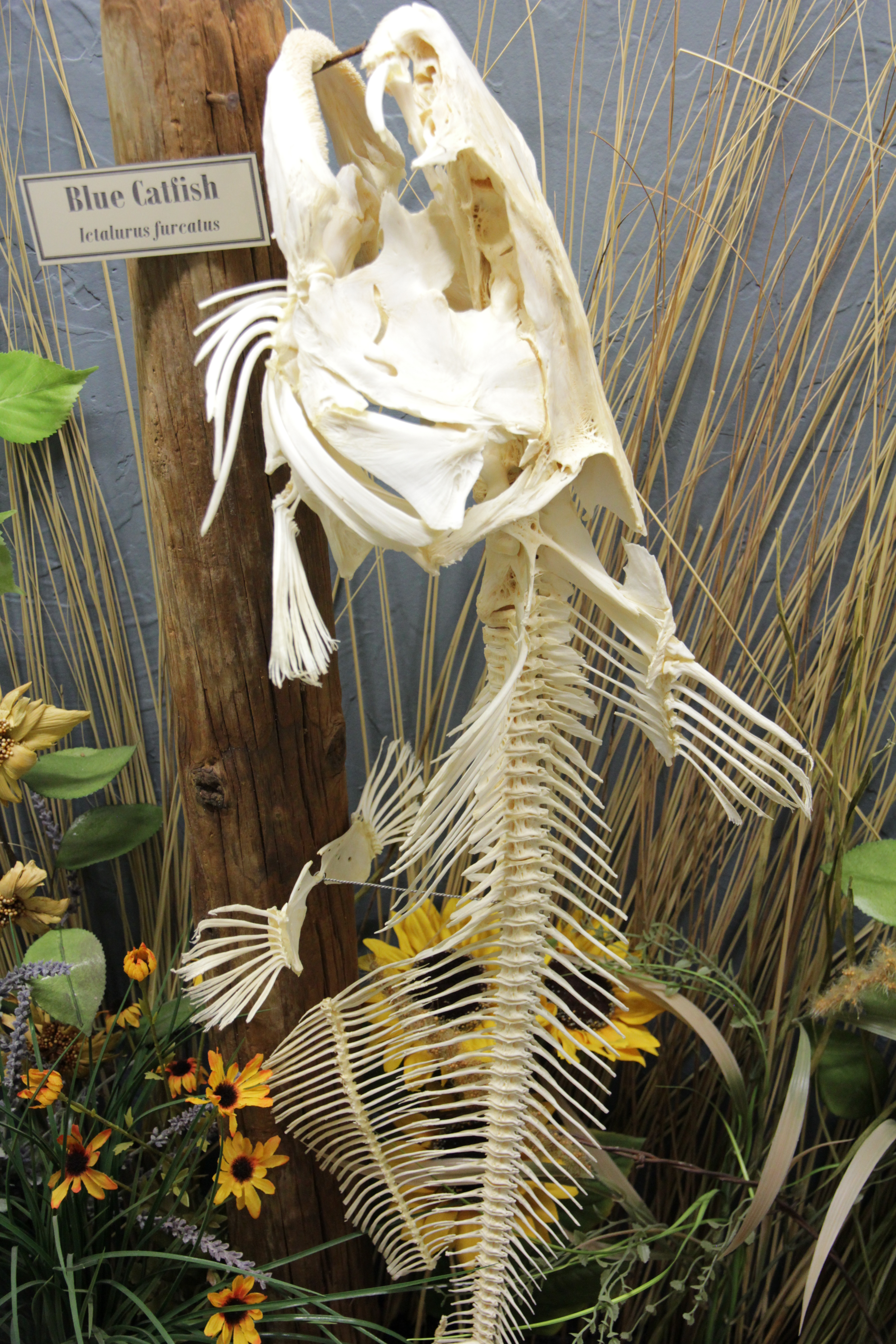
Skeleton, at the Museum of Osteology

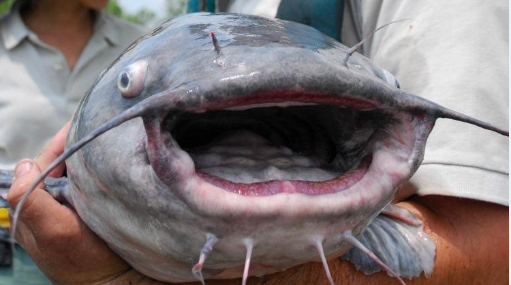
Closeup of mouth

The ability of the blue catfish to tolerate a wide range of climates and brackish water has allowed it to thrive in Virginia's rivers, lakes, tributaries, and the Chesapeake Bay. Unfortunately, the relatively low mortality rate, large body size, wide range of species preyed upon, and success as a predator has resulted in the blue catfish being considered a problematic invasive species in Virginia. Since their introduction in Virginia waters in the 1970s, blue catfish populations have exploded. Recent electrofishing studies have documented capture rates in excess of 6,000 fish/hr, whereas studies from the native range show peak electrofishing capture rates of 700 fish/hr. Clearly, blue catfish are a dominant species within the freshwater and oligohaline portions of Virginia's tidal rivers. The introduction of blue catfish in Virginia's tidal rivers was thought to have negative impacts on anadromous American shad, blueback herring, and alewife; however, predation of these species by blue catfish has been demonstrated to be minimal. Researchers from Virginia Tech have found the species to be mostly herbivorous and omnivorous, with diets consisting largely of Hydrilla and Asian clams, both of which are invasive to the Chesapeake Bay. Blue crab, the most valuable species in the Chesapeake Bay, was also found in the diet with some regularity, with blue catfish consuming an estimated 400.7 metric tonnes in the Chesapeake alone.

== Record-setting fish ==
An angling world record was set on May 22, 2005 with a 124-pound (56.2 kg) blue catfish caught in the Mississippi River, surpassing a 121.5-pound (55.1 kg) specimen from Lake Texoma in Texas.

On June 18, 2011, a 143-pound (64.9 kg) blue catfish was landed from Kerr Lake on the Virginia-North Carolina border. On June 22, 2011, the Virginia Department of Game and Inland Fisheries certified it as the new state record. The fish had a length of 57 in (145 cm) and a girth of 47 in (120 cm).

The hand-line record is a 107-pound (48.5 kg) blue catfish on 15-pound (6.8 kg)-test braided line caught June 5, 2015 on the Potomac River using a sausage with a circle hook.

== See also ==
- Flathead catfish (Pylodictis olivaris), another very large North American catfish
- Channel catfish (Ictalurus punctatus), a species of North American catfish closely related to the blue catfish
