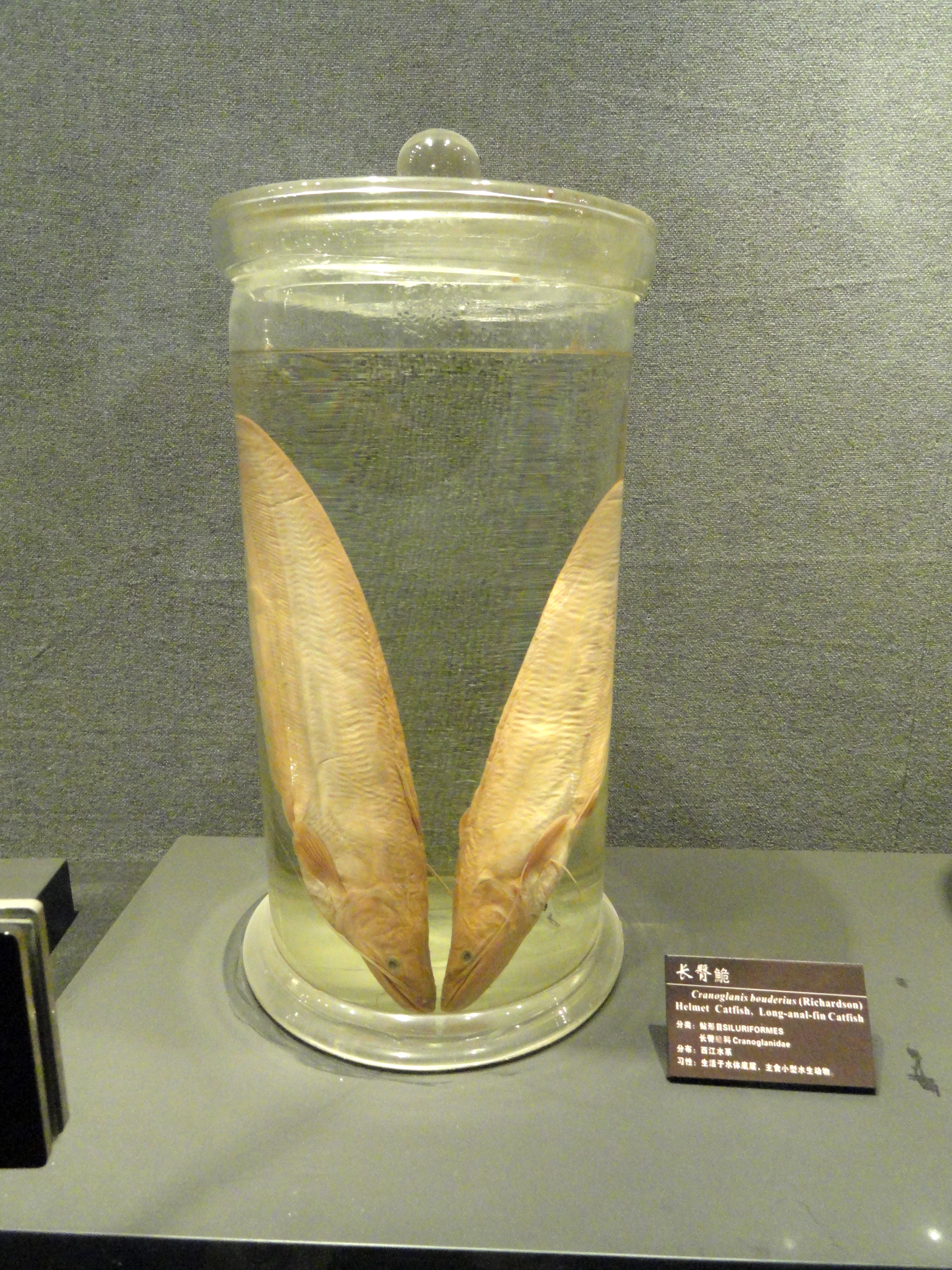
- Preserved specimens - Kunming Natural History Museum of Zoology

Conservation status
- Vulnerable (IUCN 3.1)

Scientific classification
- Kingdom: Animalia
- Phylum: Chordata
- Class: Actinopterygii
- Order: Siluriformes
- Family: Cranoglanididae
- Genus: Cranoglanis
- Species: C. bouderius

Binomial name
- Cranoglanis bouderius (J. Richardson, 1846)

Synonyms
- Bagrus bouderius Richardson, 1846; Macrones sinensis Bleeker, 1872; Cranoglanis sinensis Peters, 1881

= Cranoglanis bouderius =

Species of fish

Cranoglanis bouderius is a species of armorhead catfish found in Guangxi Province, China and Vietnam. It grows to a length of 43.0 cm (16.9 inches) SL and to 2.2 kilograms (4.9 lb). It is considered to be a fine food fish in the Zhujiang River Valley in China. It lives in clear water rivers and its diet consists of shrimps and small fishes.
