= Ictalurus australis =

Conservation status
- Data Deficient (IUCN 3.1)

Scientific classification
- Kingdom: Animalia
- Phylum: Chordata
- Class: Actinopterygii
- Order: Siluriformes
- Family: Ictaluridae
- Genus: Ictalurus
- Species: I. australis

Binomial name
- Ictalurus australis (Meek, 1904)

Synonyms
- Amiurus australis Meek, 1904

Species of fish

Ictalurus australis, the Panuco catfish, is a species of North American freshwater catfish, endemic to the Panuco River basin in Mexico.
