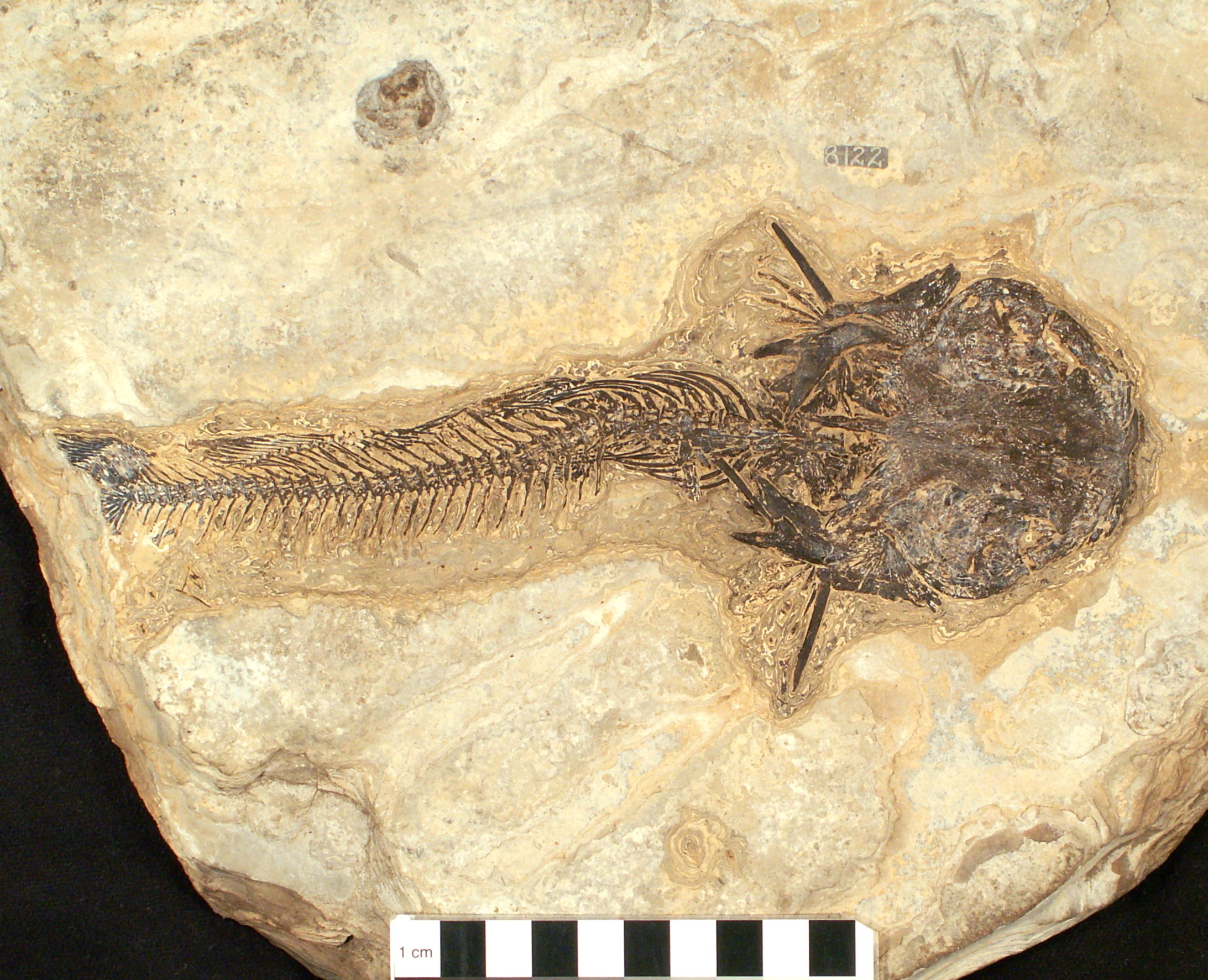
- Specimen of A. antiquus, National Museum of Natural History

Scientific classification
- Kingdom: Animalia
- Phylum: Chordata
- Class: Actinopterygii
- Order: Siluriformes
- Suborder: Siluroidei
- Family: †Astephidae; Grande & Lundberg, 1988
- Genus: †Astephus; Cope, 1873

Type species
- †Pimelodus antiquus Leidy, 1873

Species
- †A. antiquus (Leidy, 1873); †A. resimus Lundberg, 1975

= Astephus =

Astephus Temporal range: Late Paleocene to Early Oligocene

Extinct genus of fishes

Astephus is an extinct genus of freshwater catfish known from the Paleogene of western North America. It is the only member of the family Astephidae.

Previously, it was considered potentially the oldest representative of the extant family of North American catfishes (Ictaluridae). However, more recent studies have found it to be a basal catfish that is not closely related to the Ictaluridae, and have thus placed it in its own family.

There are two known species. A. antiquus (Leidy, 1873) is known from many well-preserved specimens the Early Eocene-aged Green River Formation of Colorado, Utah, and Wyoming. It is one of two catfishes known from the formation alongside Hypsidoris. They are especially common in the oil shales of the Laney Member of the formation. A. resimus Lundberg, 1975 is known only from a single incomplete neurocranium from the Early Eocene-aged Bridger Formation of Wyoming. In addition to these described species, an indeterminate Astephus species is known from the Late Paleocene-aged Polecat Bench Formation of Wyoming. Indeterminate remains of Astephus, potentially representing two species, have also been identified from the Late Eocene/Early Oligocene-aged deposits from the Cypress Hills Formation of Saskatchewan.
