= Western three-toothed land snail =

Conservation status
- Data Deficient (IUCN 2.3)

Scientific classification
- Kingdom: Animalia
- Phylum: Mollusca
- Class: Gastropoda
- Order: Stylommatophora
- Family: Polygyridae
- Genus: Triodopsis
- Species: T. occidentalis

Binomial name
- Triodopsis occidentalis (Pilsbry & Ferriss, 1894)

Species of gastropod

The western three-toothed land snail (Triodopsis occidentalis), is a species of air-breathing land snail, which is a terrestrial pulmonate gastropod mollusk in the family Polygyridae. This species is endemic to the United States.
