= Cranoglanis multiradiatus =

Scientific classification
- Domain: Eukaryota
- Kingdom: Animalia
- Phylum: Chordata
- Class: Actinopterygii
- Order: Siluriformes
- Family: Cranoglanididae
- Genus: Cranoglanis
- Species: C. multiradiatus

Binomial name
- Cranoglanis multiradiatus (Koller, 1926)

Synonyms
- Pseudeutropichthys multiradiatus Koller, 1926

Species of fish

Cranoglanis multiradiatus is a species of armorhead catfish found in China with questionable records from Vietnam.

This species reaches a length of 30.7 centimetres (12.1 in) SL.
