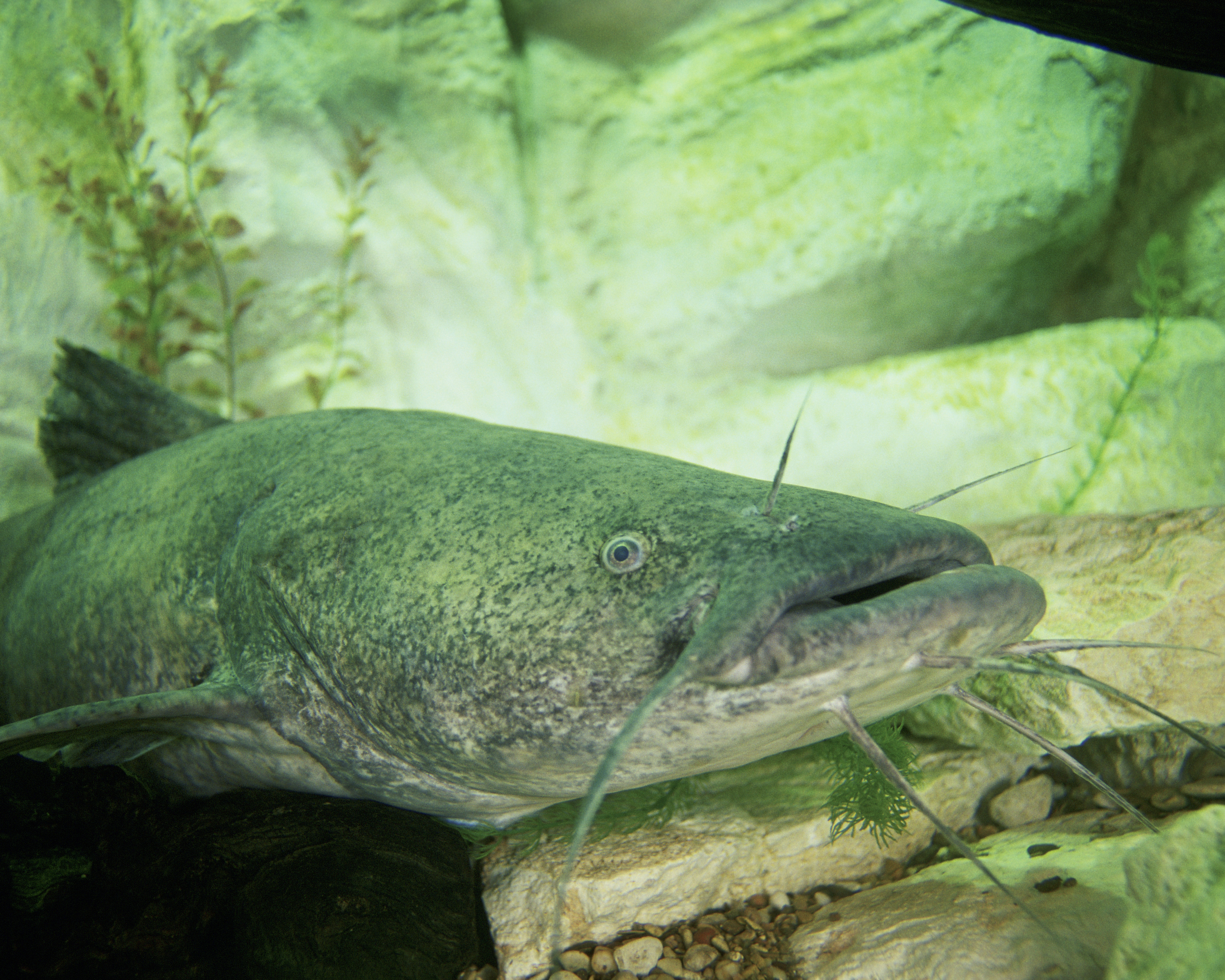

Conservation status
- Least Concern (IUCN 3.1)

Scientific classification
- Kingdom: Animalia
- Phylum: Chordata
- Class: Actinopterygii
- Division: Teleostei
- Order: Siluriformes
- Family: Ictaluridae
- Genus: Pylodictis; Rafinesque, 1819
- Species: P. olivaris

Binomial name
- Pylodictis olivaris (Rafinesque, 1818)

Synonyms
- Silurus olivaris Rafinesque, 1818

= Flathead catfish =

Flathead catfish Temporal range: Middle Miocene–present

Species of fish

The flathead catfish (Pylodictis olivaris), also called by several common names including mudcat or shovelhead cat, is a large species of North American freshwater catfish in the family Ictaluridae. It is the only species of the genus Pylodictis. Ranging from the lower Great Lakes region to northern Mexico, it has been widely introduced and is an invasive species in some areas. The closest living relative of the flathead catfish is the much smaller widemouth blindcat, Satan eurystomus, a cavefish.

== Evolution ==
Fossil remains of the flathead catfish become abundant in geological formations of the central United States from the Middle Miocene onwards. This suggests that it has existed as a distinct species for nearly 20 million years.

== Common names ==
The flathead catfish is also known as the yellow cat, mud cat, Johnnie cat, goujon, appaluchion, opelousas, pied cat and Mississippi cat. In the dialect of the Ozark mountains it may be referred to as a "granny cat."

== Description ==
The flathead catfish is olive colored on its sides and dorsum, with a white to yellow underside. Individuals, particularly young specimens from clearer waters, may be strongly mottled with dark brown to black color. The eyes are small and the lower jaw prominently projects beneath the upper. A premaxillary tooth pad has posterior extensions. The caudal fin is emarginate in structure, and its upper lobe may bear an isolated white margin. The fins are otherwise brown, though the body's mottling may extend into the fins. The anal fin has 14 to 17 rays and a round margin.

The flathead catfish grows to a length of 155 cm (61 in) and may weigh up to 55.79 kg (123.0 lb), making it the second-largest North American catfish (after the blue catfish, Ictalurus furcatus). More commonly, adult length is about 15–45 inches (38–114 cm). Its maximum recorded lifespan is 28 years. Reproductive maturity is reached between 4 and 5 years, or at approximately 18 inches (46 cm). The world angling record flathead catfish was caught May 19, 1998, from Elk City Reservoir, Kansas, and weighed 55.79 kg (123.0 lb). However, a record from 1982, caught by "other methods", shows that the flathead catfish could be North America's longest species of catfish, after a specimen pulled from the Arkansas River measured 175 centimetres (69 in) and weighed 63.45 kilograms (139 lb 14 oz).

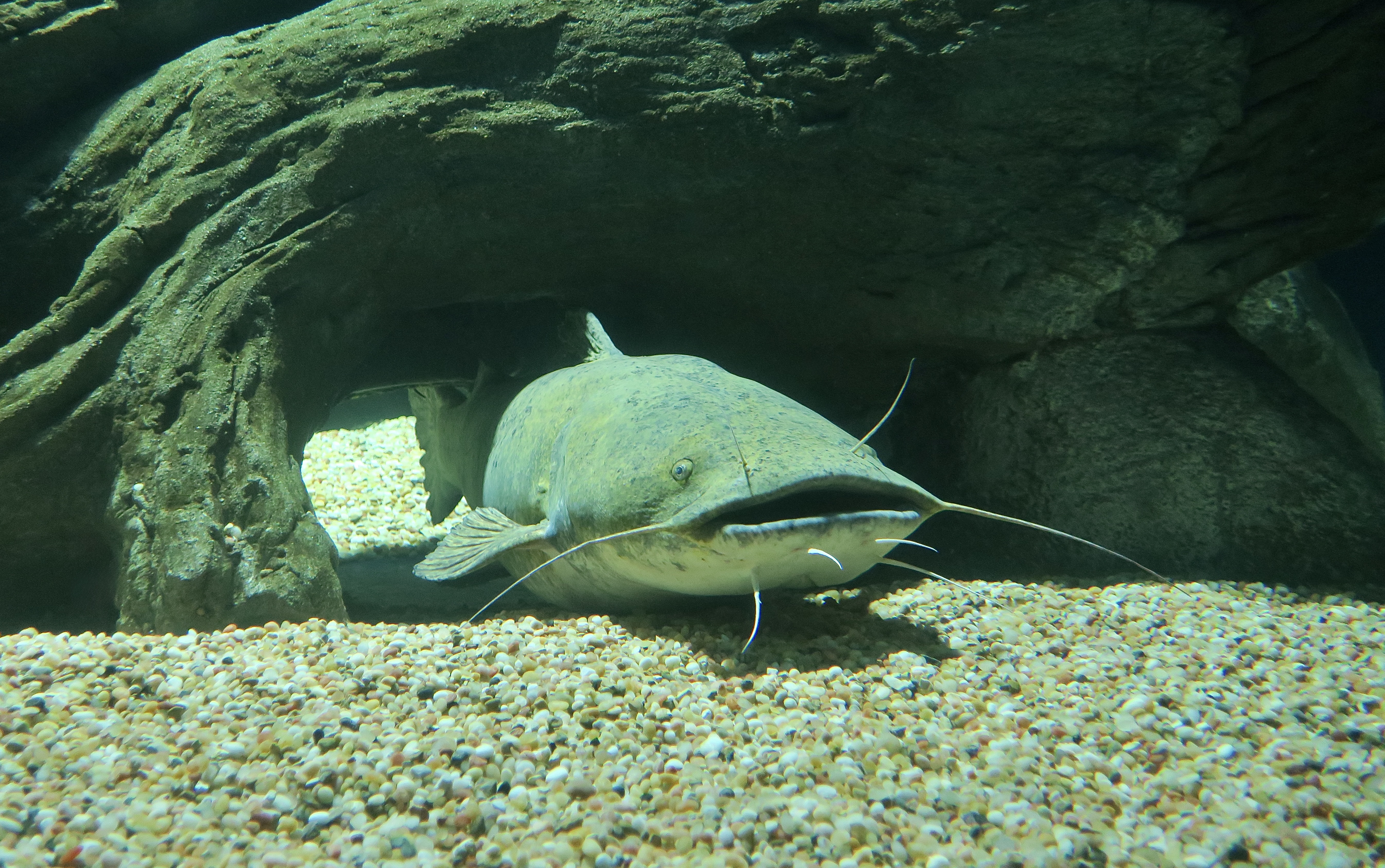
At OdySea Aquarium.

== Distribution and habitat ==
The native range of the flathead catfish includes a broad area west of the Appalachian Mountains encompassing large rivers of the Mississippi, Missouri, and Ohio basins. The range extends as far north as Canada, as far west as Texas, and south to the Gulf of Mexico including northeastern Mexico. The flathead catfish cannot live in full-strength seawater (which is about 35 parts per thousand or about 35 grams of salt per liter of water), but it can survive in 10 ppt for a while and thrive in up to about 5 ppt.

Flathead catfish are a benthic fish species meaning they are a fish which prefers to lay on the bottom of a body of water. These catfish prefer medium to large sized rivers with relatively warm water and stable slow moving currents. Flathead catfish prefer habitats with vertical banks, meaning the bank of land slightly overhangs the water and an area with fallen trees or woody debris. Specifically, these catfish prefer a woody debris depth of at least 3 metres (9.8 ft) and a diameter of woody debris of at least 3 metres (9.8 ft) to provide cover. Flathead catfish tend to have a home range of less than 2 kilometres (1.2 mi), this means that they are a non-migratory species of fish.

== Diet ==
The flathead catfish prefers live prey. It is a voracious carnivore and feeds primarily on fishes, insects, annelid worms, and crustaceans. It also feeds on other small catfish and almost anything that moves and makes vibration. They are known to eat crayfish, American gizzard shad, (Dorosoma cepedianum), blueback herring, insects and larvae, channel catfish (Ictalurus punctatus), drum (Aplodinotus grunniens), other flatheads, green sunfish (Lepomis cyanellus), and carp. Insect larvae are the major prey type until an individual reaches approximately 100 mm (3.9 in) in total length, at which point the diet expands to include crayfish and small fishes. Individuals above 250 mm (9.8 in) in length feed almost exclusively on other fish.

At about the age of two years old, flathead catfish have a diet mainly consisting of crayfish; however, their use of crayfish slowly declines until about the age of six years old. When the catfish are around six years old, they completely cut crayfish out of their diet and they eat almost entirely a diet consisting of fish; this is called a piscivorous diet. Flathead catfish experience this diet change from the ages of two to six for one of two reasons, those being either a distribution to a habitat that doesn't contain crayfish or a change in diet because of the increase in size of the catfish. The flathead catfish of six years or older that eat mainly fish have a seasonal diet shift, meaning they eat different kinds of fish depending on the time of year. Flathead catfish are a warm-water species; because of this the average consumption of juvenile flathead catfish increases with increasing temperature, and their average consumption decreases with decreasing temperatures. These catfish have a large increase in feeding at roughly 66 °F (19 °C) and their appetite remains increased up to about 90 °F (32 °C). Their appetite starts to decrease at 60 °F (16 °C), most flatheads stop eating at 52 °F (11 °C), and no catfish ate any food at or below 45 °F (7 °C).

== Breeding ==
Spawning of P. olivaris occurs in late June and early July, and the nests are made in areas with submerged logs and other debris. The males, which also build the nests, fiercely and tirelessly defend and fan the clutch. The size of the clutch varies proportionately to the size of the female; an average of 2,640 eggs per kilogram of fish are laid.

On average each female flathead lays a clutch of roughly 100,000 eggs. The role of the male catfish in fanning the clutch is to provide oxygen to the eggs through the use of his fins. The spawning of these catfish occurs when the temperature reaches roughly 66 to 75 °F (19 to 24 °C) and the flow of the stream or river becomes steady. When flathead catfish reach the ages of three to six years old they are considered sexually mature and the catfish are able to start reproducing. As the current of the river or stream erodes away some of the river bed it creates natural depressions, these depressions tend to be where flathead catfish build their nests.

The fry frequent shallow areas with rocky and sandy substrates, where they feed on insects and worms such as annelids and polychaetes. Young flathead catfish are also cannibalistic, which has largely precluded their presence in aquaculture.

== Diel movement ==
Diel movement is the migration of an animal during a 24-hour period. Flathead catfish have a change in their diel movement depending on the season. In the spring and summer, flathead catfish have an increase in their movement activity from midnight to dawn, with their diel movement being the greatest in summer. By contrast, in the fall and winter, flathead catfish do not show any increased movement within a 24-hour time frame, with their diel movement being the smallest in the winter. Flathead catfish have a diel movement which is the largest in the summer time because of their spawning, which takes place from late spring to early summer, while in the winter they have the smallest diel movement because they are waiting for winter to end, which is called the overwintering phase.

== See also ==
- List of fish common names
