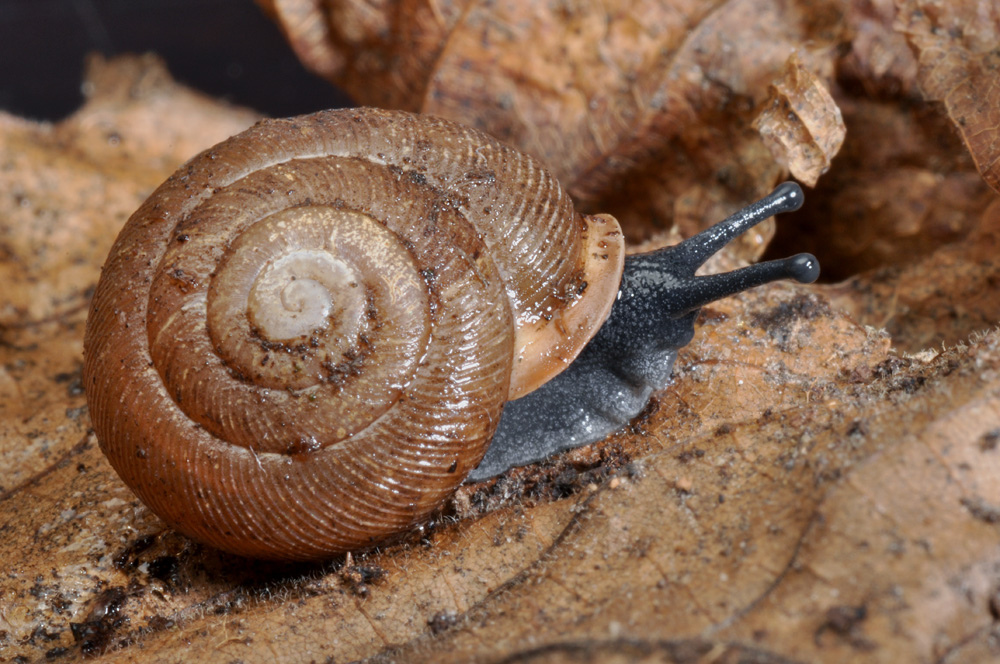
- Triodopsis tridentata
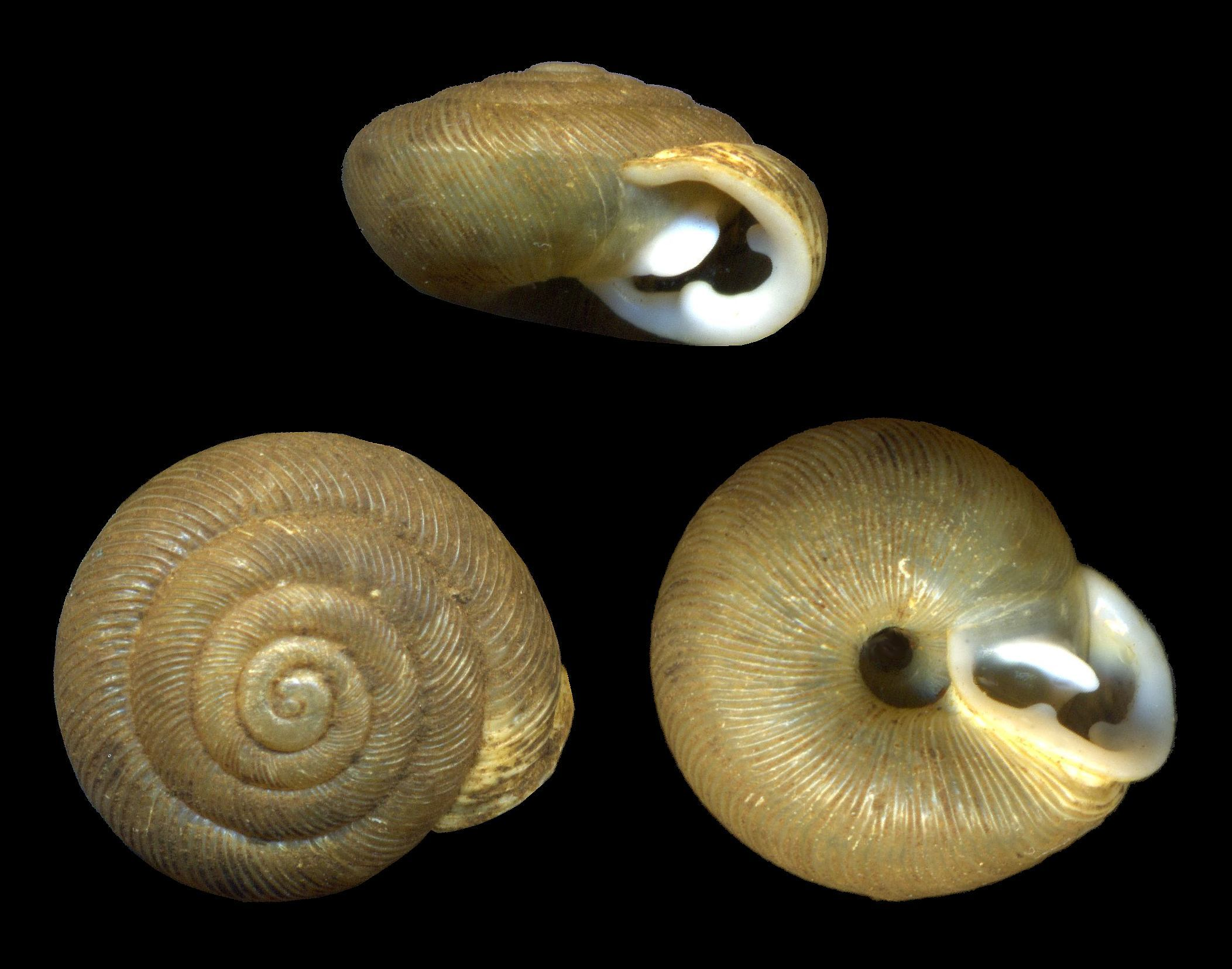
- Three views of a shell of Triodopsis hopetonensis

Scientific classification
- Kingdom: Animalia
- Phylum: Mollusca
- Class: Gastropoda
- Order: Stylommatophora
- Family: Polygyridae
- Genus: Triodopsis; Rafinesque, 1819

= Triodopsis =

Genus of gastropods

Triodopsis is a genus of air-breathing land snails, terrestrial pulmonate gastropod mollusks in the family Polygyridae.

== Species ==
The following species are recognised in the genus Triodopsis:

- Triodopsis alabamensis (Pilsbry, 1902)
- Triodopsis anteridon Pilsbry, 1940
- Triodopsis burchi Hubricht, 1950
- Triodopsis claibornensis Lutz, 1950
- Triodopsis complanata (Pilsbry, 1898)
- Triodopsis cragini Call, 1886
- Triodopsis discoidea (Pilsbry, 1904)
- Triodopsis fallax (Say, 1825)
- Triodopsis fraudulenta (Pilsbry, 1894)
- Triodopsis fulciden Hubricht, 1952
- Triodopsis henriettae (Mazÿck, 1878)
- Triodopsis hopetonensis (Shuttleworth, 1852) - magnolia three-tooth, magnolia threetooth
- Triodopsis juxtidens (Pilsbry, 1894)
- Triodopsis messana Hubricht, 1952
- Triodopsis neglecta (Pilsbry, 1899)
- Triodopsis obsoleta (Pilsbry, 1894)
- Triodopsis occidentalis (Pilsbry & Ferriss, 1894) - western three-toothed land snail
- Triodopsis palustris Hubricht, 1958
- Triodopsis pendula Hubricht, 1952
- Triodopsis picea Hubricht, 1958
- Triodopsis platysayoides (Brooks, 1932) - flat-spired three-toothed snail
- Triodopsis rugosa Brooks & MacMillan, 1940
- Triodopsis soelneri (J. B. Henderson, 1907)
- Triodopsis subpersonatum (Middendorff, 1850)
- Triodopsis tennesseensis (B. Walker & Pilsbry, 1902)
- Triodopsis tridentata (Say, 1817) - northern three-tooth, northern threetooth
- Triodopsis vannostrandi (Bland, 1876)
- Triodopsis vulgata Pilsbry, 1940
- Triodopsis vultuosa (A. Gould, 1848)
