= Toothless blindcat =

Conservation status
- Vulnerable (IUCN 3.1)

- Critically Imperiled (NatureServe)

Scientific classification
- Kingdom: Animalia
- Phylum: Chordata
- Class: Actinopterygii
- Order: Siluriformes
- Family: Ictaluridae
- Genus: Trogloglanis; C. H. Eigenmann, 1919
- Species: T. pattersoni

Binomial name
- Trogloglanis pattersoni C. H. Eigenmann, 1919

Species of fish

The toothless blindcat (Trogloglanis pattersoni) is a species of North American freshwater catfish endemic to Texas in the United States.

== Description ==
The toothless blindcat has no pigmentation and no externally visible eyes. The eye remnants are extremely reduced in size, with very little or no trace of a retina or lens; the optic tract is present, but always regresses before reaching the brain. In juveniles, the eye is under the skin, but as the fish grows, the eyes are withdrawn even further. The head is as long as it is broad. The adipose fin is long and rounded at the end, and is connected to the caudal fin. The dorsal and pectoral fins have spines. The swim bladder in these fish is reduced. The stomach is reduced in size and surrounded by deposits of adipose tissue allowing for adequate energy to be stored. The skull is mostly cartilaginous and not well-ossified, unlike the adults of most larger ictalurids. The lateral line is fragmented and reaches to between the anterior to the posterior end of the adipose fin. This species also has a few paedomorphic traits (indicated by small size which ranges from 16–89 millimetres or 0.63–3.50 inches, kidney morphology, and weak ossification of the skeleton). This species may reach about 10.4 centimetres (4.1 in) TL.

== Diet ==
Its toothless, sucker-like mouth possibly indicates T. pattersoni is a detritivore.

== Distribution and habitat ==
Along with the related widemouth blindcat (Satan eurystomus), this species inhabits subterranean habitats in five artesian wells penetrating the San Antonio Pool of the Edwards Aquifer in and near San Antonio, Texas.

== Conservation ==
The toothless blindcat is threatened by overextraction of groundwater from the Edwards Aquifer. In 2023, it was proposed for endangered listing under the Endangered Species Act of 1973 by the U.S. Fish and Wildlife Service, as was the sympatric widemouth blindcat.
