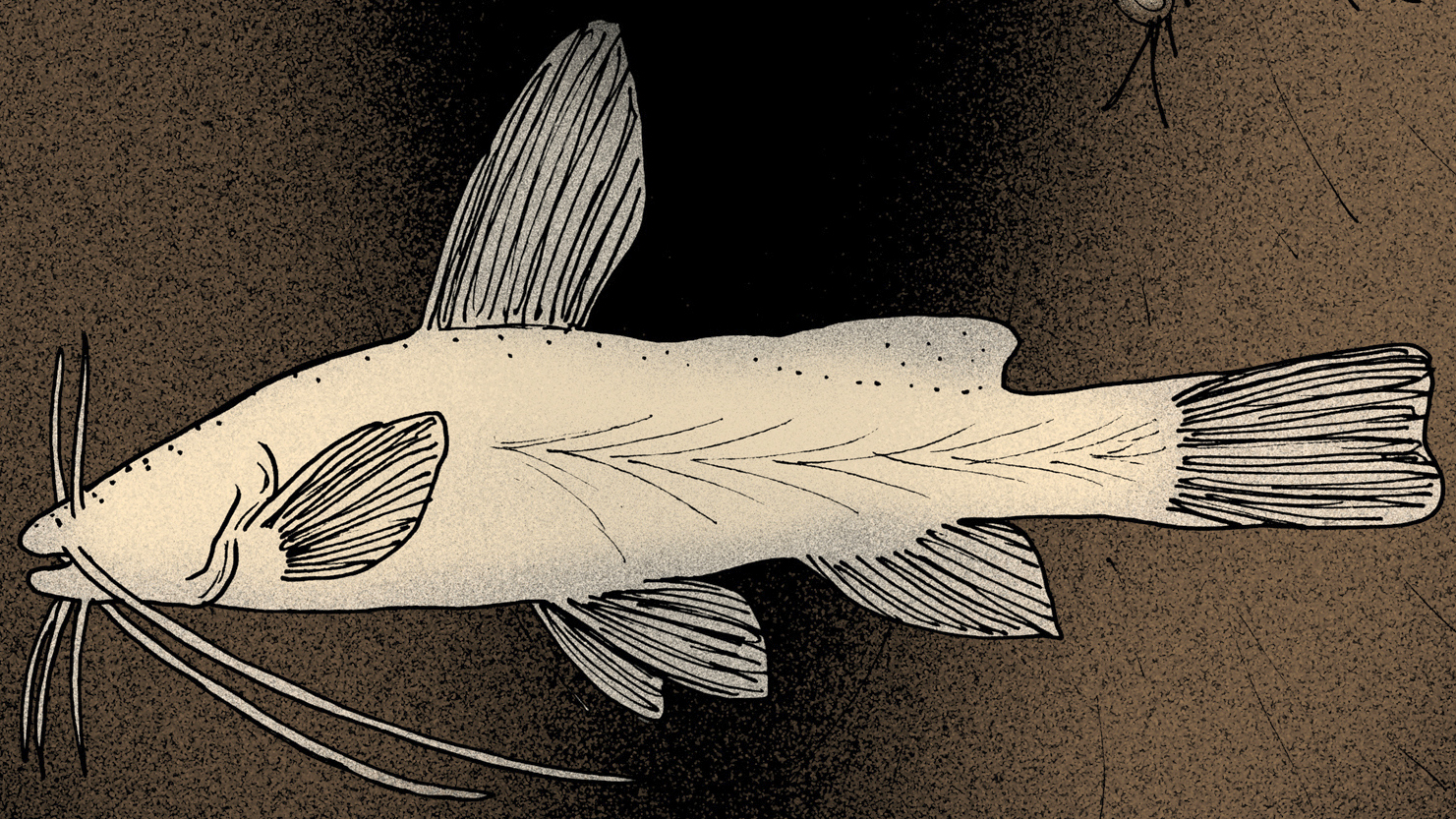

Conservation status
- Vulnerable (IUCN 3.1)

- Critically Imperiled (NatureServe)

Scientific classification
- Kingdom: Animalia
- Phylum: Chordata
- Class: Actinopterygii
- Order: Siluriformes
- Family: Ictaluridae
- Genus: Satan; C. L. Hubbs & R. M. Bailey, 1947
- Species: S. eurystomus

Binomial name
- Satan eurystomus C. L. Hubbs & R. M. Bailey, 1947

= Widemouth blindcat =

Species of fish

The widemouth blindcat (Satan eurystomus) is a species of North American freshwater catfish endemic to Texas in the United States. It is the only species in the genus Satan.

== Description ==
It was first discovered inhabiting a well, and is adapted for a lightless underground environment. Like other cavefish, the widemouth blindcat lacks pigmentation and has no externally visible eyes. The eye remnants are extremely reduced in size with very little or no trace of a retina or lens; the optic tract is present, but always regresses before reaching the brain. The swim bladder in these fish is reduced, and the skull is mostly cartilaginous and not well-ossified, unlike the adults of most larger ictalurids. The lateral line is fragmentary and never reaches past the anterior part of the anal fin. This species also has a few paedomorphic traits (indicated by small size, kidney morphology, and weak ossification of the skeleton). This species grows to about 13.7 cm (5.4 in) TL.

== Taxonomy ==
The widemouth blindcat's closest relative is the much larger flathead catfish (Pylodictis olivaris).

== Distribution and habitat ==
Along with the related toothless blindcat (Trogloglanis pattersoni), this species is distributed in five artesian wells penetrating the San Antonio Pool of the Edwards Aquifer in and near San Antonio, Texas. These fish have been found with crustacean exoskeletons in their stomachs, and may be the top carnivore in their habitat.

== Conservation ==
The widemouth blindcat is a vulnerable species, and is threatened by groundwater pollution. In 2023, the U.S. Fish and Wildlife Service proposed to list the species as endangered under the Endangered Species Act of 1973 along with the sympatric toothless blindcat.

== See also ==
- Blindness in animals
