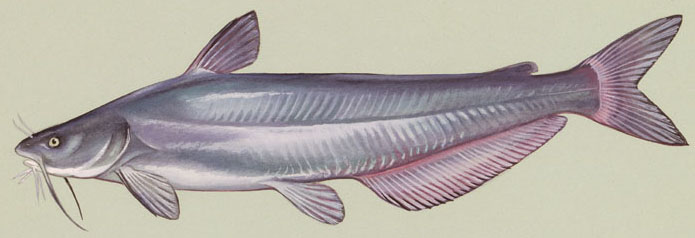
- Blue catfish, Ictalurus furcatus

Scientific classification
- Domain: Eukaryota
- Kingdom: Animalia
- Phylum: Chordata
- Class: Actinopterygii
- Order: Siluriformes
- Superfamily: Ictaluroidea
- Family: Ictaluridae; T. N. Gill, 1861

Genera
- Ameiurus, bullheads Ictalurus; Noturus, madtoms Prietella; Pylodictis; Satan; Trogloglanis

= Ictaluridae =

Ictaluridae Temporal range: Late Eocene - recent

Family of fishes

The Ictaluridae, sometimes called ictalurids, are a family of catfish native to North America, where they are an important food source and sometimes fished for sport. The family includes about 51 species, some commonly known as bullheads, madtoms, channel catfish, and blue catfish.

== Taxonomy ==
The family Ictaluridae is strongly supported as a monophyletic group. It is closely related to the Asian family Cranoglanididae. These two families are sister taxa in the superfamily Ictaluroidea.

Though the family includes three genera of blind, subterranean, and troglobitic catfishes, Trogloglanis, Satan, and Prietella, none of these three genera is closely related. Instead, Satan is closely related to Pylodictis, Prietella to Noturus, and Trogloglanis possibly to Ictalurus, although it may not be closely related to any of the other ictalurids. Ameiurus is sister to a clade formed by Satan, Pylodictis, Noturus, and Prietella.

The oldest fossil member of the family was previously thought to be Astephus from the Eocene Green River Formation of Utah and Wyoming. However, more recent studies consider Astephus to not be closely related to the Ictaluridae, and to instead belong to its own extinct family. Excluding Astephus, the oldest fossil member of the family is †Ictalurus rhaeas Cope, 1891 from the latest Eocene-aged Cypress Hills Formation of Saskatchewan.

== Distribution and habitat ==
Ictalurids originate from North America from southern Canada to Guatemala. Both bullheads and madtoms tend to be found in small streams and ponds, but are also known in larger bodies of water. Channel catfish, bullheads, and madtoms are "bottom feeders" with widely varied diets that include scavenging.

== Notable species ==
- Blue catfish Ictalurus furcatus
- Tadpole madtom
- Brown bullhead
- Yellow bullhead
- Black bullhead
- Channel catfish
- Widemouth blindcat

== Description ==
Ictalurid species have four pairs of barbels (commonly referred to as "whiskers" as applied to catfish). Their skin does not have any scales. The dorsal and pectoral fins usually possess a spine. The dorsal fin usually has six soft rays. The palate is toothless except in the fossil genus Astephus. The genera Trogoglanis, Satan, and Prietella include four species of blind catfishes. They have the ability to inflict painful stings with venomous spines embedded in their fins.

One of the largest species is the blue catfish, Ictalurus furcatus, specimens of which have been found to weigh over 50 kg (110 lb). The maximum length is 160 cm (5.2 ft) in the blue catfish and the flathead catfish. The bullheads, though, are small catfish which at maturity often weigh less than 0.5 kg (1 lb), while the madtoms (genus Noturus) are in general much smaller.

== Relationship to humans ==
The North American catfish has acquired an association with American Southern folklore which exceeds its place as a mere food fish. The image of cane-pole fishing for catfish at a proverbial lazy stream has become a stand-by of southern Americana.

In some areas, the bullhead is seen as a desirable quarry, for its fighting qualities exceed its size. In other areas, it is seen as a nuisance fish due to its efficient bait-stealing qualities.
