= Megerle von Mühlfeld =

Megerle von Mühlfeld is a surname. Notable people with the surname include:

- Johann Carl Megerle von Mühlfeld (1765–1840), Austrian naturalist
- Johann Georg Megerle von Mühlfeld (1780–1831), Austrian naturalist
- Therese Megerle von Mühlfeld (1813–1865), Austrian author and dramatist
