= Mühlfeld =

Mühlfeld (or Muhlfeld) is a German surname. Notable people with the surname include:

- Lucien Muhlfeld (1870–1902), French novelist and dramatic critic
- Richard Mühlfeld (1856–1907), German clarinettist

== See also ==
- Megerle von Mühlfeld
