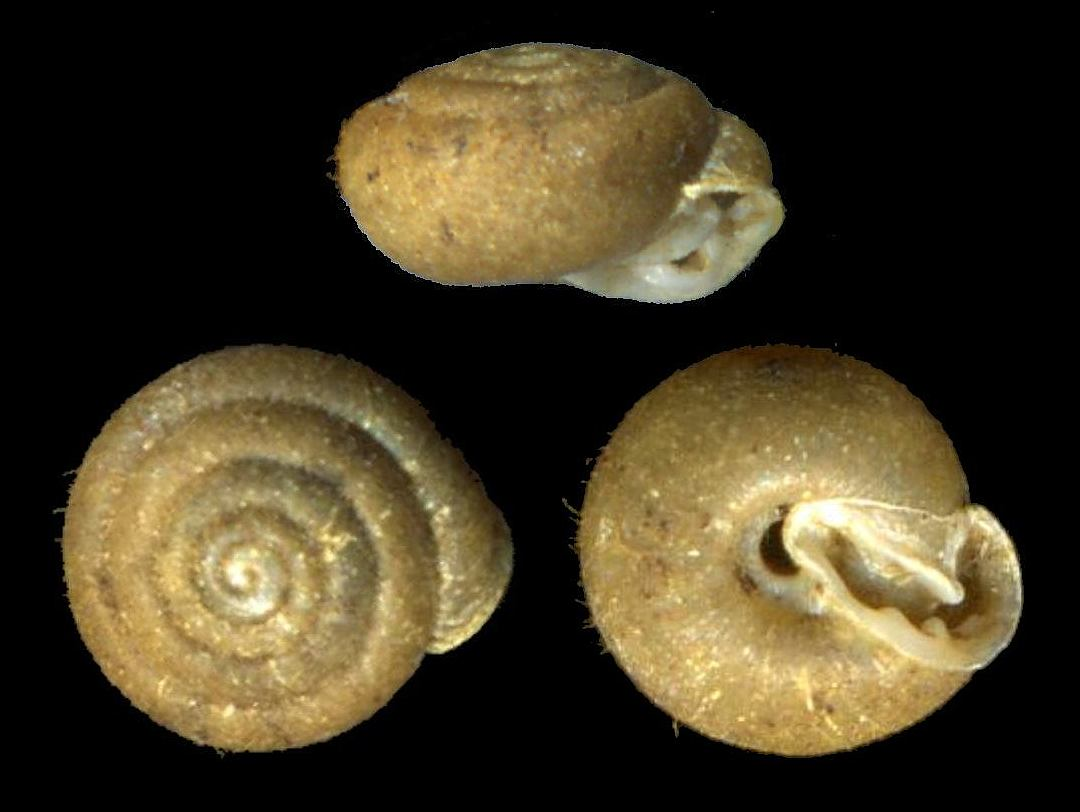
- Three views of a shell of Lobosculum pustula

Scientific classification
- Kingdom: Animalia
- Phylum: Mollusca
- Class: Gastropoda
- Order: Stylommatophora
- Family: Polygyridae
- Subfamily: Polygyrinae
- Genus: Lobosculum; Pilsbry, 1930

Species
- See text

= Lobosculum =

Genus of gastropods

Lobosculum is a genus (or a subgenus under Polygyra) of small air-breathing land snails, terrestrial pulmonate gastropod molluscs in the family Polygyridae.

== Shell description ==
These are among the smallest snails in the Polygyridae, with shell diameters of about 4 to 6 mm (approximately 1/5 inch). The shells of this species usually have a velvety surface, as a consequence of numerous hair-like extensions of the surface covering of the shell, the periostracum.

== Distribution ==
The known distribution of this species is limited to the United States: along the Gulf of Mexico from Texas to Florida, as well as Georgia, and the Mississippi valley from Arkansas to Indiana.

== Species ==
This genus includes the following species and subspecies:

- Lobosculum leporinum (Gould, 1848)
- Lobosculum pustula (Férussac, 1822)
- Lobosculum pustuloides (Bland, 1858)
