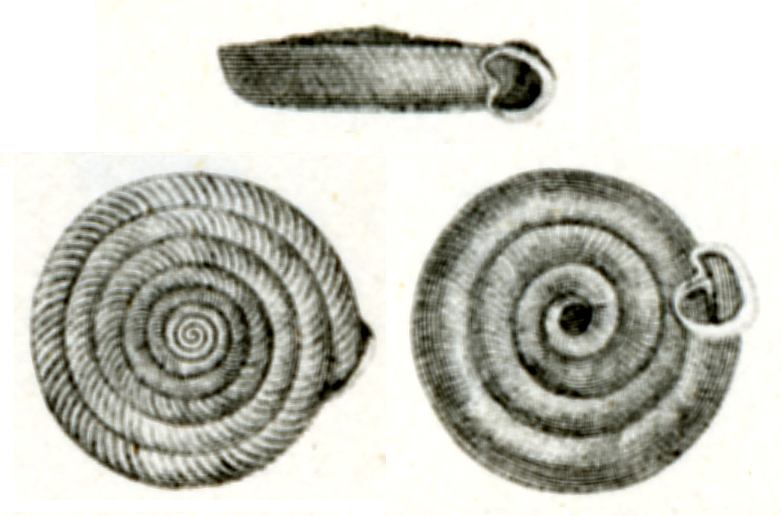
- Polygyra cereolus from W. G. Binney, 1878

Conservation status
- Apparently Secure (NatureServe)

Scientific classification
- Kingdom: Animalia
- Phylum: Mollusca
- Class: Gastropoda
- Order: Stylommatophora
- Family: Polygyridae
- Genus: Polygyra
- Species: P. cereolus

Binomial name
- Polygyra cereolus (Megerle von Mühlfeld, 1818)

= Polygyra cereolus =

Species of gastropod

Polygyra cereolus, the southern flatcoil, is a species of air-breathing land snail, a terrestrial pulmonate gastropod mollusc in the family Polygyridae.

== Subspecies ==
- Polygyra cereolus floridana
