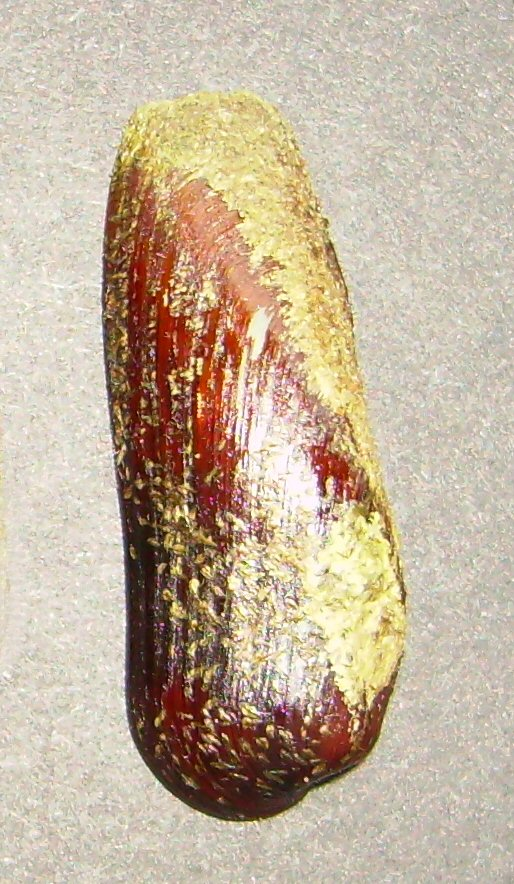
- One valve of a shell of Lithophaga truncata

Scientific classification
- Kingdom: Animalia
- Phylum: Mollusca
- Class: Bivalvia
- Order: Mytilida
- Family: Mytilidae
- Genus: Lithophaga; Röding, 1798

Species
- See text

Synonyms
- Lithophagus Megerle von Mühlfeld, 1811; Lithodomus Cuvier, 1816

= Lithophaga =

Lithophaga Temporal range: 225.0–0.0 Ma Triassic to Recent

Genus of bivalves

Lithophaga, the date mussels, are a genus of medium-sized marine bivalve molluscs in the family Mytilidae. Some of the earliest fossil Lithophaga shells have been found in Mesozoic rocks from the Alps and from Vancouver Island.

The shells of species in this genus are long and narrow with parallel sides. The animals bore into stone or coral rock with the help of pallial gland secretions, hence the systematic name Lithophaga, which means "stone-eater". Their club-shaped borings are given the trace fossil name Gastrochaenolites.

== Species ==
Species within the genus Lithophaga include:

- Lithophaga antillarum (d'Orbigny, 1842) - giant date mussel
- Lithophaga aristata (Dillwyn, 1817) - scissor date mussel
- Lithophaga attenuata (Deshayes, 1836) - attenuated date mussel
- Lithophaga balanas Dall
- Lithophaga balanus Dall
- Lithophaga bisulcata (d'Orbigny, 1842) - mahogany date mussel
- Lithophaga cardigera
- Lithophaga cavernosa
- Lithophaga cinnamomeus
- Lithophaga dactylus
- Lithophaga fasciola Dall, Bartsch, & Rehder
- Lithophaga gracilis Philippi
- Lithophaga hawaia Dall, Bartsch, & Rehder
- Lithophaga ilabis (Deshayes)
- Lithophaga lithophaga (Linne)
- Lithophaga nigra (d'Orbigny, 1842) - black date mussel
- Lithophaga plumula (Hanley, 1844) - feather date mussel
- Lithophaga punctata (Kleemann & Hoeksema, 2002)
- Lithophaga rogersi S. S. Berry, 1957 - Roger's date mussel
- Lithophaga truncata (Gray, 1843)
- Lithophaga simplex
