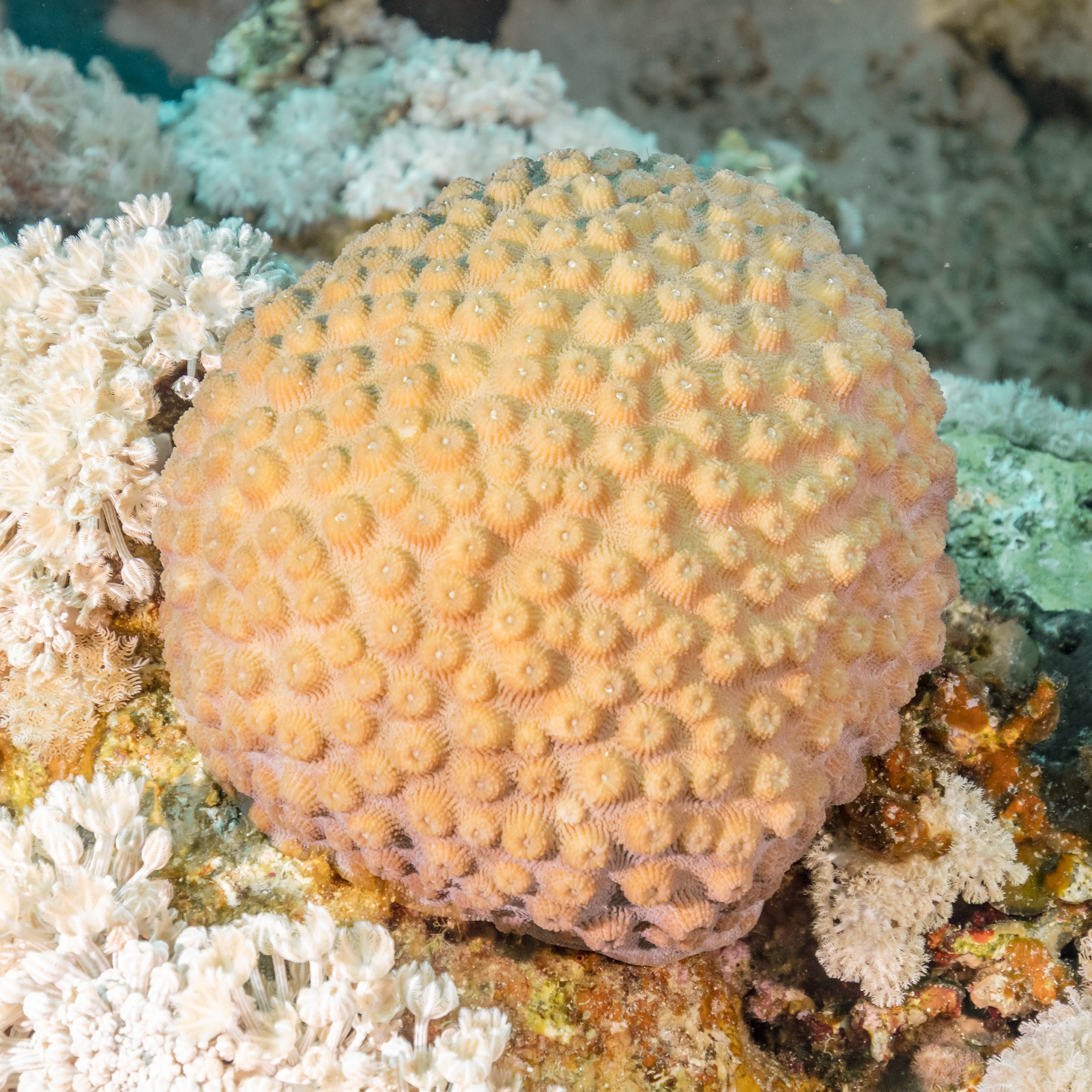

Conservation status
- Least Concern (IUCN 3.1)

Scientific classification
- Kingdom: Animalia
- Phylum: Cnidaria
- Subphylum: Anthozoa
- Class: Hexacorallia
- Order: Scleractinia
- Family: Acroporidae
- Genus: Astreopora
- Species: A. myriophthalma

Binomial name
- Astreopora myriophthalma (Lamarck, 1816)

Synonyms
- Astrea myriophthalma Lamarck, 1816; Astrea pulvinaria Lamarck, 1816; Astreopora arenaria Bernard, 1896; Astreopora ehrenbergi Bernard, 1896; Astreopora eliptica Yabe & Sugiyama, 1941; Astreopora kenti Bernard, 1896; Astreopora ovalis Bernard, 1896; Astreopora profunda Verrill, 1872; Astreopora pulvinaria Lamarck, 1816; Astreopora stellae Nemenzo, 1964

= Astreopora myriophthalma =

Species of coral

Astreopora myriophthalma, sometimes known as porous star coral, is a species of hard coral found in shallow water in the tropical Indian and Pacific Oceans. It is a common species with a wide range and the International Union for Conservation of Nature has assessed its conservation status as being of "least concern".

== Description ==
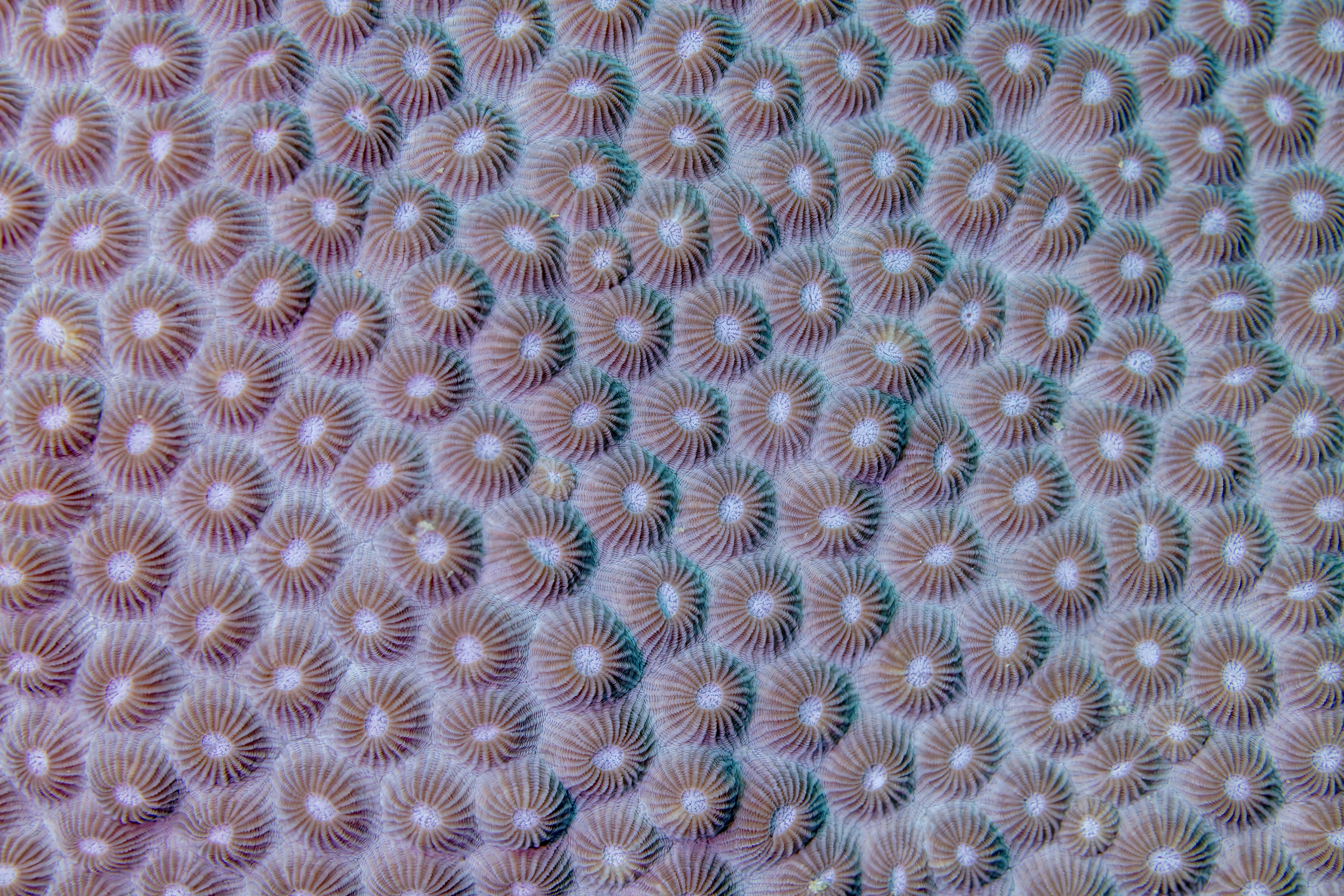
Detail view

A. myriophthalma is a colonial species which forms massive hemispherical or boulder-shaped colonies. The corallites are conical and evenly distributed over the surface; each has a circular, upright or outwardly-pointing opening. The colour of this coral varies but may be plain or mottled and cream, yellow or brownish-blue. It is similar in appearance to Astreopora gracilis and Astreopora listeri.

== Distribution and habitat ==
A. myriophthalma has a wide distribution in the tropical Indian and Pacific Oceans. Its range extends from East Africa and the Red Sea through Indonesia and northern Australia to Japan, the Philippines and various Pacific island groups. It occupies a variety of reef habitats at depths between 3 and 20 m (10 and 66 ft), but avoids turbid water.

== Ecology ==
Researchers found that where spionid worms had bored into heads of Astreopora myriophthalma, the areas surrounding their colonies had benefited; the researchers suggested that the faeces from the worms had provided extra nutrients for the coral's symbiotic zooxanthellae, and their increased photosynthetic activity had increased tissue growth in the coral in the immediate vicinity.

The bivalve Lithophaga simplex also bores into the coral, often in dense populations. This may be a symbiotic relationship with the bivalve benefiting from protection and increased nutrition, and, despite its structure being weakened, the coral benefiting from the ammonium excreted by the molluscs.

== Status ==
Astreopora myriophthalma is the most common species of coral in its genus and has a widespread distribution in the tropical and sub-tropical Indian and Pacific Oceans. It is a comparatively resilient species with no species-significant threats. However its population is likely to be declining because of the degradation of coral reefs, with an estimated loss of around 20% in the reefs on which it grows. Climate change and ocean acidification are also likely to be threats going forward, and be associated with increased bleaching events and greater incidence of coral diseases as well as man-made hazards such as pollution, sedimentation, damage from fisheries and tourism. The International Union for Conservation of Nature has assessed its conservation status as being of "least concern".
