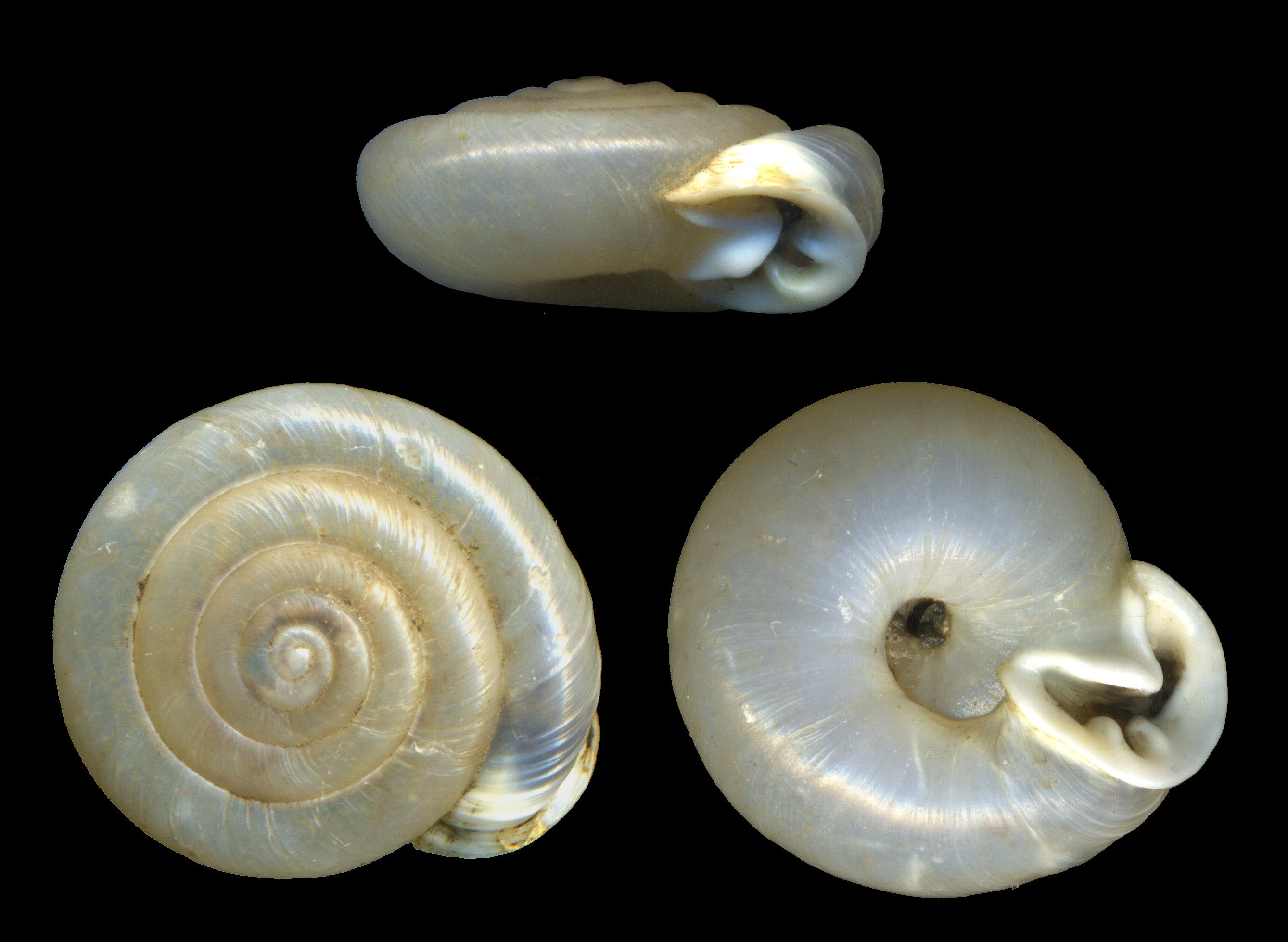
- Linisa tamaulipasensis

Scientific classification
- Kingdom: Animalia
- Phylum: Mollusca
- Class: Gastropoda
- Order: Stylommatophora
- Infraorder: Helicoidei
- Superfamily: Helicoidea
- Family: Polygyridae
- Genus: Linisa; Pilsbry, 1930

Synonyms
- Acutidens Pilsbry, 1956 (junior synonym); Erymodon Pilsbry, 1956 (junior synonym); Monophysis Pilsbry, 1956 (junior synonym); Polygyra (Acutidens) Pilsbry, 1956 (junior synonym); Polygyra (Erymodon) Pilsbry, 1956 (junior synonym); Polygyra (Linisa) Pilsbry, 1930 (unaccepted rank); Polygyra (Monophysis) Pilsbry, 1956 (junior synonym); Polygyra (Solidens) Pilsbry, 1956 (junior synonym); Solidens Pilsbry, 1956 (junior synonym)

= Linisa =

Genus of gastropods

Linisa is a genus (or a subgenus under Polygyra) of air-breathing land snails, terrestrial pulmonate gastropod mollusks in the subfamily Polygyrinae of the family Polygyridae.

== Species ==
This genus includes the following species and subspecies:

- Linisa acutedentata (W. G. Binney, 1858)
- † Linisa adamnis (Dall, 1890)
- Linisa albicostulata (Pilsbry, 1896)
- Linisa anilis (Gabb, 1865)
- Linisa ariadnae (L. Pfeiffer, 1848)
- Linisa aulacomphala (Pilsbry & Hinkley, 1907)
- Linisa behri (Gabb, 1865)
- Linisa bicruris (L. Pfeiffer, 1857)
- Linisa cantralli (Solem, 1957)
- Linisa euglypta (Pilsbry, 1896)
- Linisa hertleini (Haas, 1961)
- Linisa hindsi (L. Pfeiffer, 1846)
- Linisa implicata (E. von Martens, 1865)
- Linisa matermontana (Pilsbry, 1896)
- Linisa nelsoni (Dall, 1897)
- Linisa oppilata (Morelet, 1849)
- Linisa pergrandis (Solem, 1959)
- Linisa polita (Pilsbry & Hinkley, 1907)
- Linisa ponsonbyi (Pilsbry, 1896)
- Linisa rhoadsi (Pilsbry, 1899)
- Linisa richardsoni (E. von Martens, 1892)
- Linisa suprazonata (Pilsbry, 1899)
- Linisa tamaulipasensis (I. Lea, 1857)
- Linisa texasiana (Moricand, 1833)
- Linisa ventrosula (L. Pfeiffer, 1846)
