= Andreas Stütz =

Austrian Augustinian abbott and mineralogist

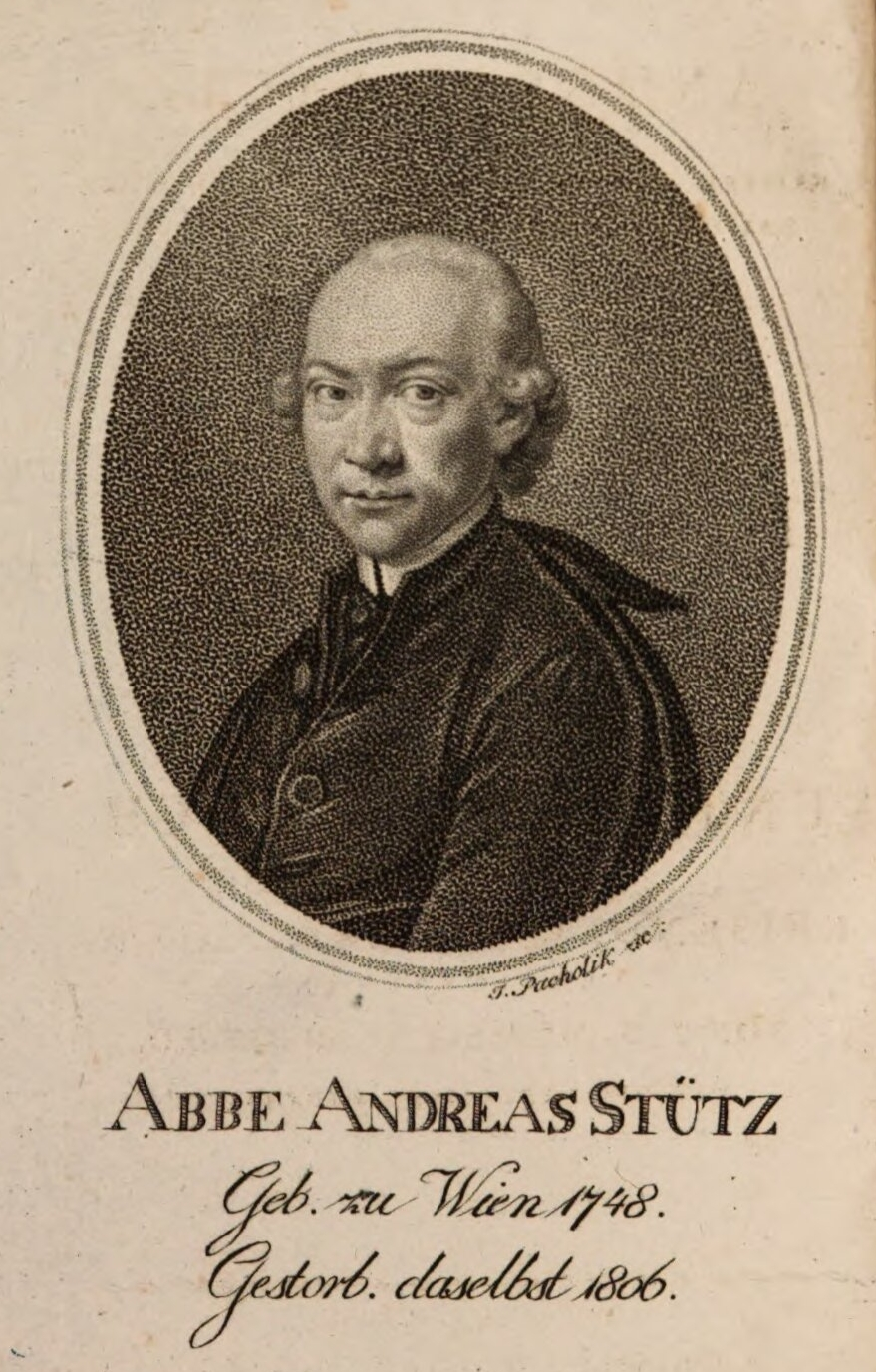

Andreas Xaverius Stütz (22 August 1747 – 12 February 1806) was an Austrian Augustinian abbott and mineralogist. He was a curator of mineralogy at the Imperial natural history cabinet of Vienna which would later become the natural history museum of Vienna.

== Life and work ==
Stütz joined the Augustinian order at St. Dorothea Abbey at the age of seventeen and was invested on May 21, 1764. He took his vows on July 20, 1770 and was ordained priest on September 29, 1771. He was appointed preacher at his monastery. After the monastery was abolished in 1782, he began to teach at the royal realakademie and in 1788 he was appointed to the Imperial cabinet of natural history replacing Karl Haidinger who moved to the mining academy at Schemnitz. When the collections were unified as the "Vereinigte Naturalien-, Physikalisches und Astronomisches Cabinet" (United Natural History, Physical and Astronomic Cabinet) he became director of the natural history collections alongside Ludwig Balthasar Ritter von Baillou (1758-1802). He worked along with Johann Baptist Megerle (1780–1806) and his sons Johann Carl Megerle and Johann Georg Megerle. He held his position until his death and was succeeded by Carl Franz Anton Ritter von Schreibers (1775-1852).

Stütz took an interest in minerals and meteorites. He catalogued the meteorite collection in his Catalogus Stützianus but he was skeptical of their origins. He described two iron meteorites that "allegedly" fell at Agram in Croatia in 1751 and suggested that they were created by lightning strike on stones. Stütz was also involved in conducting mineral surveys in the Austrian empire. He was made an Imperial Councilor.

The mineral Stützite made up of silver and Tellurium is named after him.
