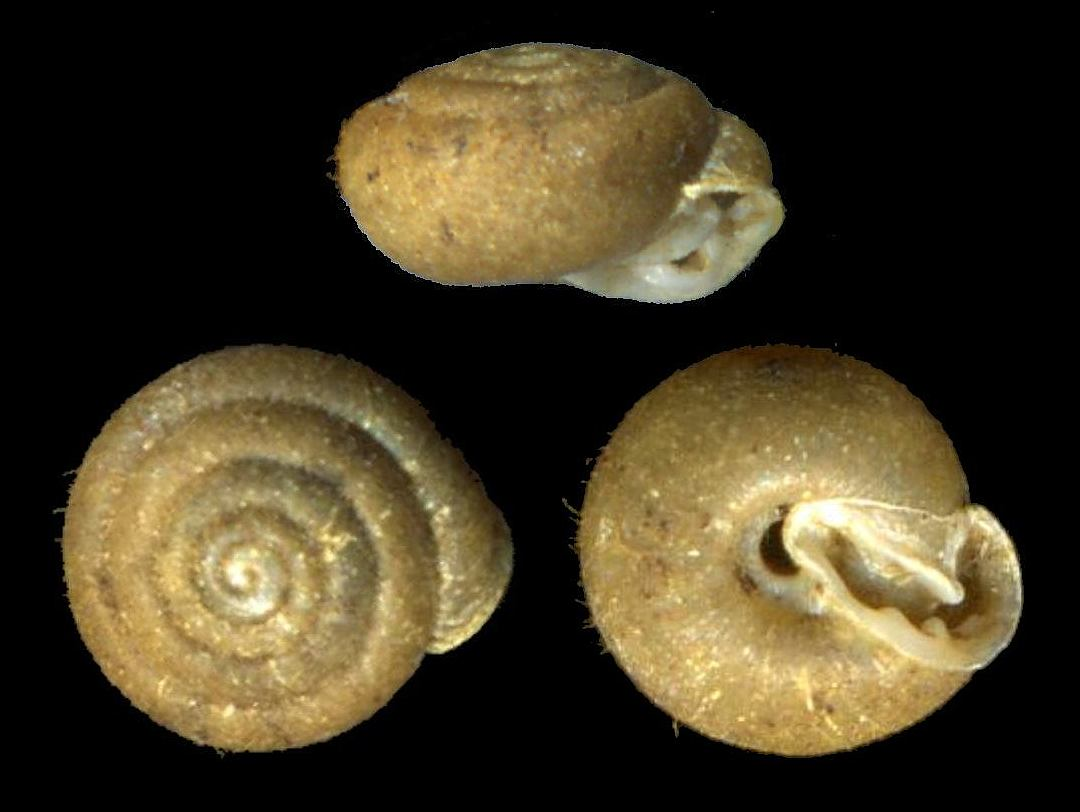
- Three views of a shell of Lobosculum pustula

Conservation status
- Vulnerable (NatureServe)

Scientific classification
- Kingdom: Animalia
- Phylum: Mollusca
- Class: Gastropoda
- Order: Stylommatophora
- Family: Polygyridae
- Genus: Lobosculum
- Species: L. pustula

Binomial name
- Lobosculum pustula (Férussac, 1822)

= Lobosculum pustula =

Species of gastropod

Lobosculum pustula is a species of small air-breathing land snail, a terrestrial gastropod mollusc in the family Polygyridae.
