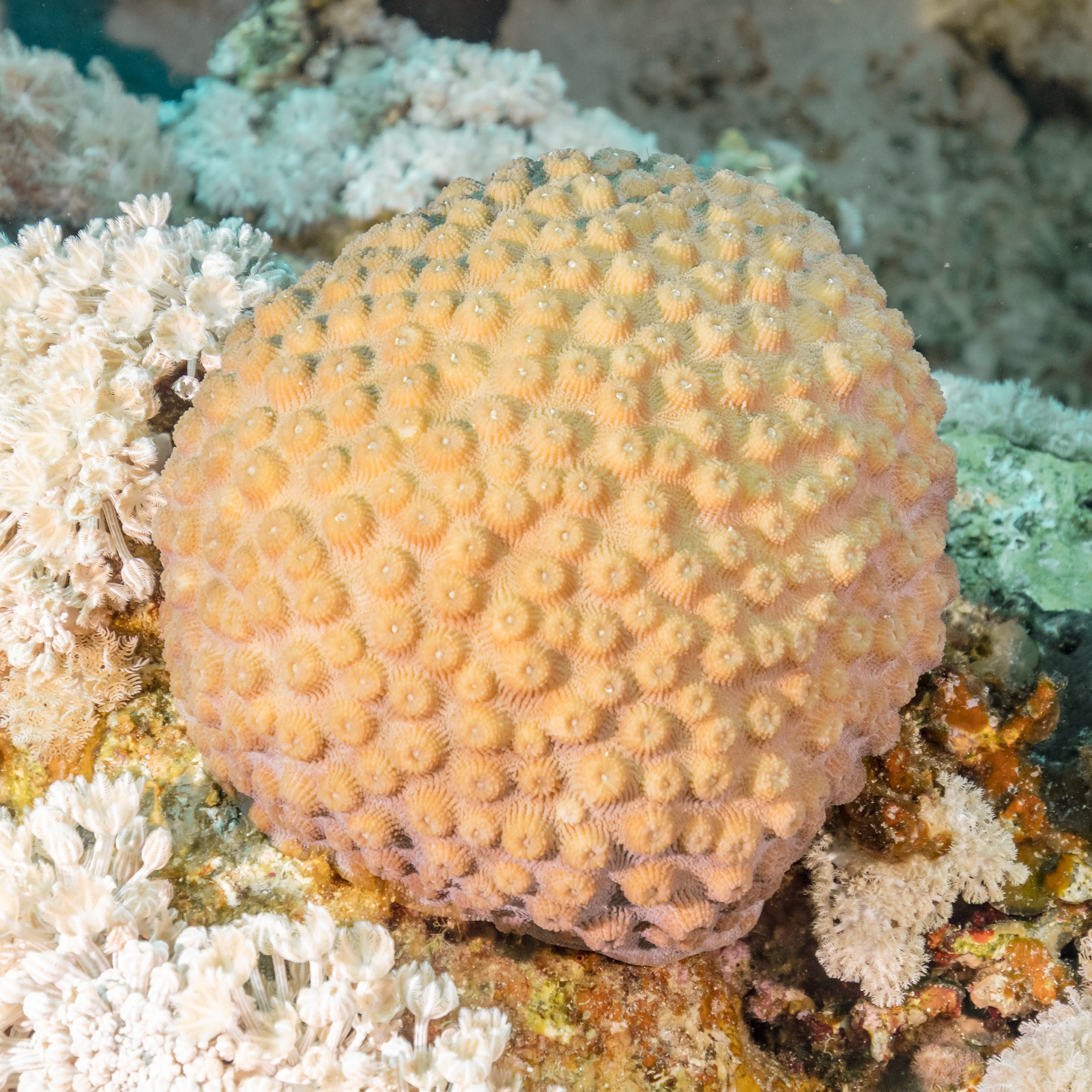
- Astreopora myriophthalma

Scientific classification
- Kingdom: Animalia
- Phylum: Cnidaria
- Subphylum: Anthozoa
- Class: Hexacorallia
- Order: Scleractinia
- Family: Acroporidae
- Genus: Astreopora; Blainville, 1830

Species
- See text

Synonyms
- Astraeopora Blainville, 1830 [lapsus]

= Astreopora =

Genus of corals

Astreopora is a genus of stony corals in the Acroporidae family. Members of the genus are commonly known as star corals and there are seventeen species currently recognized.

== Description ==
Members of this genus mostly form dome-shaped or rounded heads but sometimes have leaflike extensions, which vary from massive mounds to encrusting, or which form plates, vases and branches. They are much larger than members of the genus Montipora. They have a wide range of colours including yellow, brown, green, pink and blue but the most common are whitish-blue. The corallites are distinct and separate, sometimes raised on cones and sometimes depressed, up to four millimetres across and round in cross-section. The skeleton is porous with the coenosteum having a net-like appearance. The coral appears rough-textured because of tiny spines that cover the surface between the corallites. The septa are poorly developed giving corals of this genus the appearance of being filled with holes.

== Distribution ==
Members of this genus occur in the Red Sea, the Indian Ocean and the western Pacific. They are widespread but not particularly common and are a reef building species. They are found in a range of environments including shallow or muddy waters, as well as deeper areas of the reef where plating forms are most common. In shallow water they are inconspicuous and are never dominant. They may form heads of up to two metres in diameter and in deeper waters they may be much more common.

== Ecology ==
The porous skeleton of these corals provide a home to a variety of polychaete worms that weaken the calcium carbonate structure by tunnelling into it.

Several species of coral-inhabiting barnacles are associated with Astreopora. In fact, Hiroa stubbingsi and two species of Cionophorus seem to occur nowhere else. In the case of H. stubbingsi, which has a primitive wall and a relatively unspecialised operculum, this may be because it is not equipped to occupy other corals, but the Cionophorus species are smaller and it is an enigma why they are not found elsewhere.

== Species ==
Known species include:

- Astreopora acroporina Wallace, Turak & DeVantier, 2011
- Astreopora cenderawasih Wallace, Turak & DeVantier, 2011
- Astreopora cucullata Lamberts, 1980
- Astreopora expansa Brüggemann, 1877
- Astreopora explanata Veron, 1985
- Astreopora gracilis Bernard, 1896
- Astreopora incrustans Bernard, 1896
- Astreopora lambertsi Moll and Best, 1984
- Astreopora listeri Bernard, 1896
- Astreopora macrostoma Veron and Wallace, 1984
- Astreopora monteporina Wallace, Turak & DeVantier, 2011
- Astreopora moretonensis Veron and Wallace, 1984
- Astreopora myriophthalma (Lamarck, 1816)
- Astreopora ocellata Bernard, 1896
- Astreopora randalli Lamberts, 1980
- Astreopora scabra Lamberts, 1982
- Astreopora suggesta Wells, 1954
