= Astreopora incrustans =

Conservation status
- Endangered (IUCN 3.1)

Scientific classification
- Kingdom: Animalia
- Phylum: Cnidaria
- Subphylum: Anthozoa
- Class: Hexacorallia
- Order: Scleractinia
- Family: Acroporidae
- Genus: Astreopora
- Species: A. incrustans

Binomial name
- Astreopora incrustans Bernard, 1896

Species of cnidarian

Astreopora incrustans, commonly known as starflower coral, is a species of hard coral found in the central Indo-Pacific, Japan and the East China Sea, the Solomons, Eastern Australia, and the Philippines. It is uncommon throughout its range.
