= Millerelix =

Scientific classification
- Domain: Eukaryota
- Kingdom: Animalia
- Phylum: Mollusca
- Class: Gastropoda
- Order: Stylommatophora
- Family: Polygyridae
- Genus: Millerelix; Pratt, 1981

Genus of gastropods

Millerelix is a genus of land snails in the family Polygyridae.

Species include:

- Millerelix deltoidea – Oklahoma liptooth
- Millerelix dorfeuilliana – oakwood liptooth
- Millerelix fatigiata – bluegrass liptooth
- Millerelix gracilis – Edwards Plateau liptooth
- Millerelix jacksoni – Ozark liptooth
- Millerelix lithica – stone liptooth
- Millerelix mooreana – grassland liptooth
- Millerelix peregrina – white liptooth
- Millerelix plicata – Cumberland liptooth
- Millerelix simpsoni – Wyandotte liptooth
- Millerelix troostiana – Nashville liptooth
