= Lithophaga punctata =

Scientific classification
- Kingdom: Animalia
- Phylum: Mollusca
- Class: Bivalvia
- Order: Mytilida
- Family: Mytilidae
- Genus: Lithophaga
- Species: L. punctata

Binomial name
- Lithophaga punctata Kleemann & B. W. Hoeksema, 2002

Species of mussel

Lithophaga punctata is a species of mussel that belongs to the family Mytilidae. This species can be found in South Sulawesi, Indonesia. It is a minute species with its shell being small and thin. The shell is also very fragile.

They are seen boring into mushroom corals (Fungiidae).
