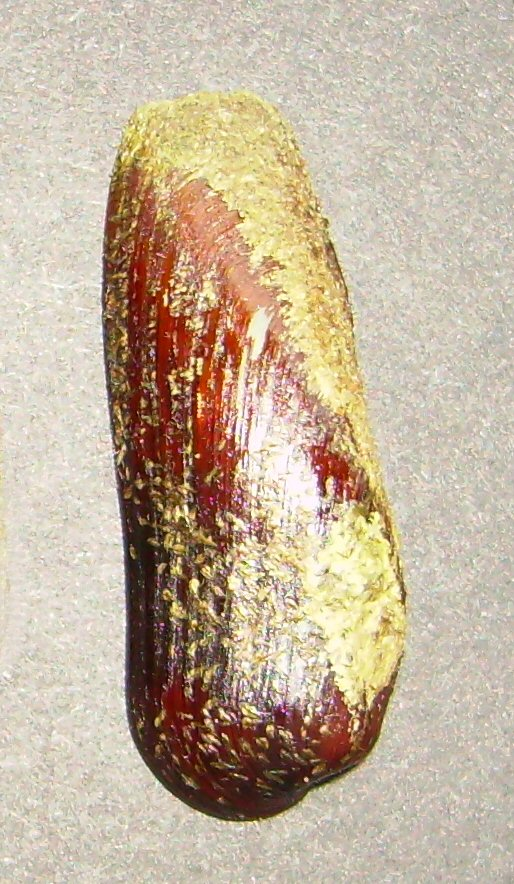

Scientific classification
- Kingdom: Animalia
- Phylum: Mollusca
- Class: Bivalvia
- Order: Mytilida
- Family: Mytilidae
- Genus: Lithophaga
- Species: L. truncata

Binomial name
- Lithophaga truncata (Gray, 1843)

= Lithophaga truncata =

Species of bivalve

Lithophaga truncata is a date mussel, a marine bivalve mollusc in the family Mytilidae.

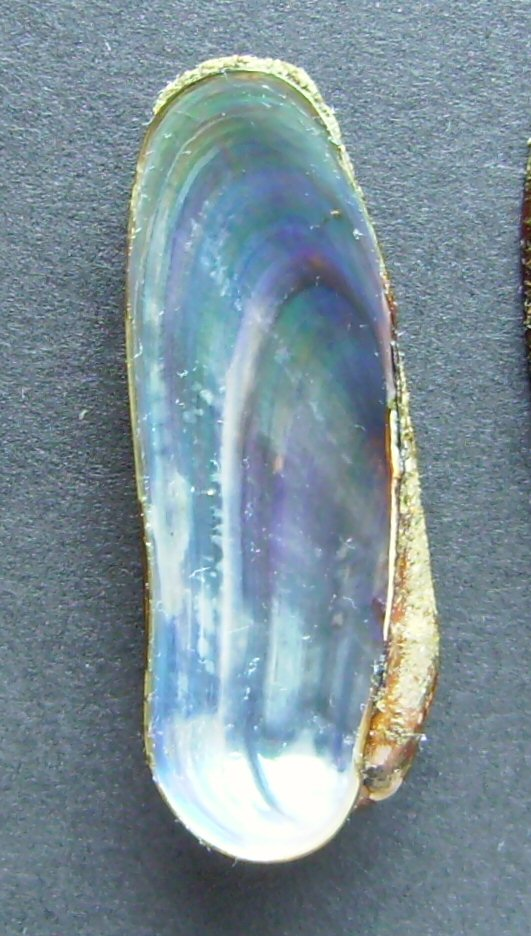
Lithophaga truncata inside view, showing the iridescence
