= Kraussina =

Scientific classification
- Domain: Eukaryota
- Kingdom: Animalia
- Phylum: Brachiopoda
- Class: Rhynchonellata
- Order: Terebratulida
- Family: Kraussinidae
- Genus: Kraussina; Davidson, 1859

Genus of brachiopods

Kraussina is a genus of brachiopods belonging to the family Kraussinidae.

The species of this genus are found in Southern and Eastern Africa.

Species:

- Kraussina cognata (Sowerby, 1847)
- Kraussina crassicostata Jackson, 1952
- Kraussina crassiocostata Jackson, 1952
- Kraussina cuneata Brunton & Hiller, 1990
- Kraussina gardineri Dall, 1910
- Kraussina laevicostata Brunton & Hiller, 1990
- Kraussina lata Haughton, 1932
- Kraussina mercatori Helmcke, 1939
- Kraussina rotundata Brunton & Hiller, 1990
- Kraussina rubra (Pallas, 1766)
