= Lithophaga simplex =

Scientific classification
- Kingdom: Animalia
- Phylum: Mollusca
- Class: Bivalvia
- Order: Mytilida
- Family: Mytilidae
- Genus: Lithophaga
- Species: L. simplex

Binomial name
- Lithophaga simplex Iredale, 1939

Synonyms
- Leiosolenus simplex (Iredale, 1939)

Species of bivalve

Lithophaga simplex is a species of bivalve mollusc in the family Mytilidae. It is a boring species, tunnelling into living coral colonies. It can be found in the tropical western central Pacific Ocean.

== Description ==
Lithophaga simplex is one of the smaller members of its genus. The shell grows to a maximum length of 20 mm (0.8 in) and a width of 7 mm (0.3 in). It is narrow and cylindrical, tapering slightly at the posterior end, with the umbo near the anterior end. Both ends are rounded and the hinge line is straight. The periostracum is yellowish and covered by a chalky crust. This mollusc can be distinguished from other similar species by its inflated shell and by the dark siphon.

== Ecology ==
Lithophaga simplex bores into living colonies of coral. In the Red Sea it is commonly found in the massive coral Astreopora myriophthalma. The mollusc was at one time considered to be a parasite of the coral because its tunnelling activities weakened the coral structure and made it more liable to suffer damage. However it has now been found that the ammonium products that the mollusc excretes serve as nutrients, and the benefits of these to the coral colony may outweigh the disadvantages of structural weakening, so the relationship between the two is probably mutualistic. Other host corals for this bivalve include Goniastrea pectinata, and Plesiastrea versipora.

When molluscs of this species were removed from their host corals, researchers found that they tended to spawn in the last quarter of the lunar month or around the time of the new moon. The larvae followed the normal course of development of mytilids. When the veliger larvae were well-enough developed to settle on the seabed, they were capable of delaying metamorphosis by up to four months, a fact that would enable them to disperse widely while searching for suitable substrates on which to settle.
