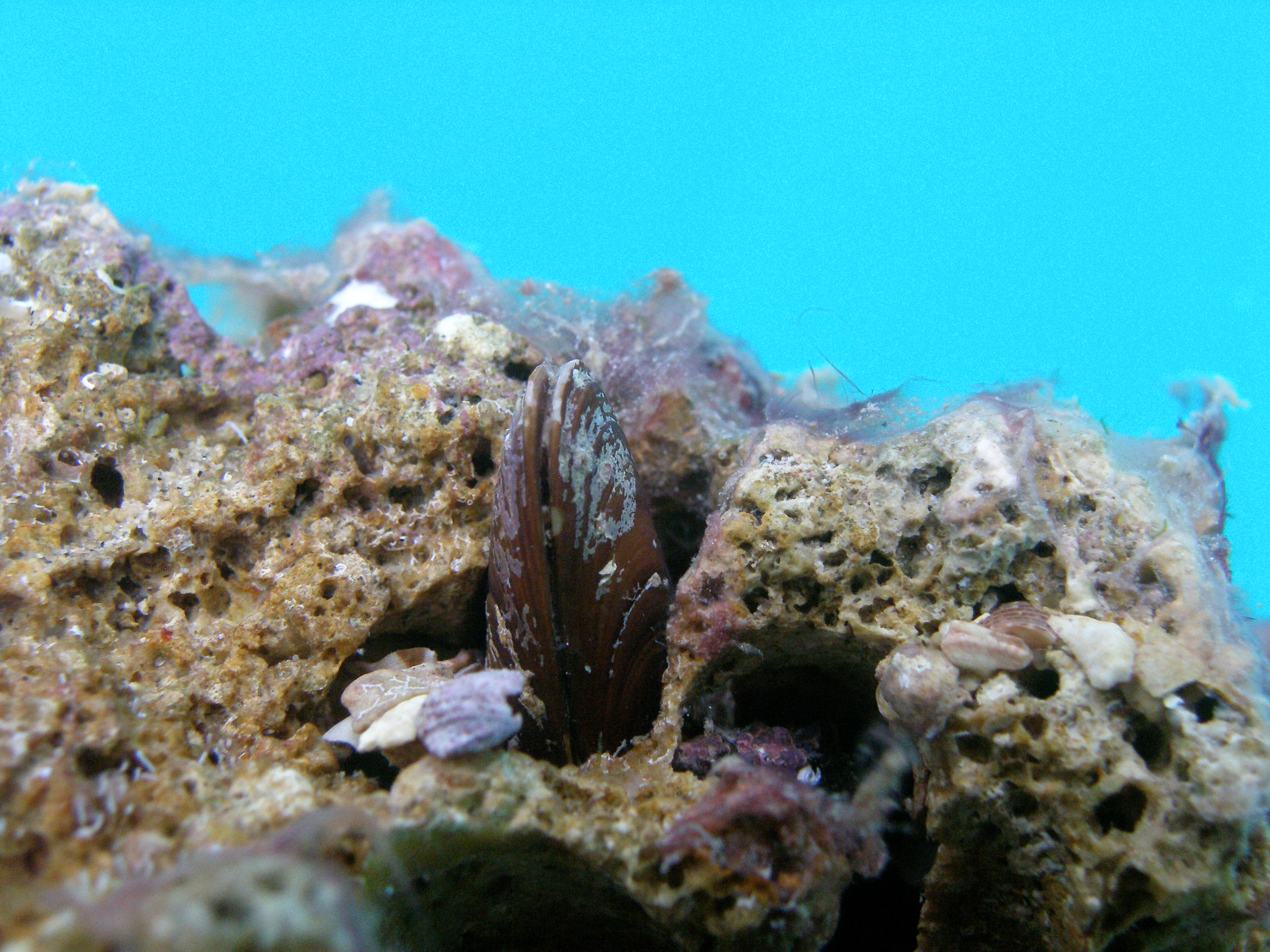
- Lithophaga lithophaga boring into marine rocks

Conservation status
- CITES Appendix II

Scientific classification
- Kingdom: Animalia
- Phylum: Mollusca
- Class: Bivalvia
- Order: Mytilida
- Family: Mytilidae
- Genus: Lithophaga
- Species: L. lithophaga

Binomial name
- Lithophaga lithophaga (Linnaeus, 1758)

= Lithophaga lithophaga =

Lithophaga lithophaga Temporal range: Miocene - Recent

Species of bivalve

Lithophaga lithophaga, also known as date shell or date mussel, is a species of Bivalvia belonging to the family Mytilidae.

== Fossil record ==
Fossils of Lithophaga lithophaga are found in marine strata from the Miocene until the Quaternary (age range: from 15.97 to 0.0 million years ago).

== Distribution ==
This species can be found in the northeast Atlantic Ocean, the Mediterranean Sea and the Red Sea. They are found on the Adriatic coast of Croatia and Montenegro under the name prstaci.

== Habitat and biology ==
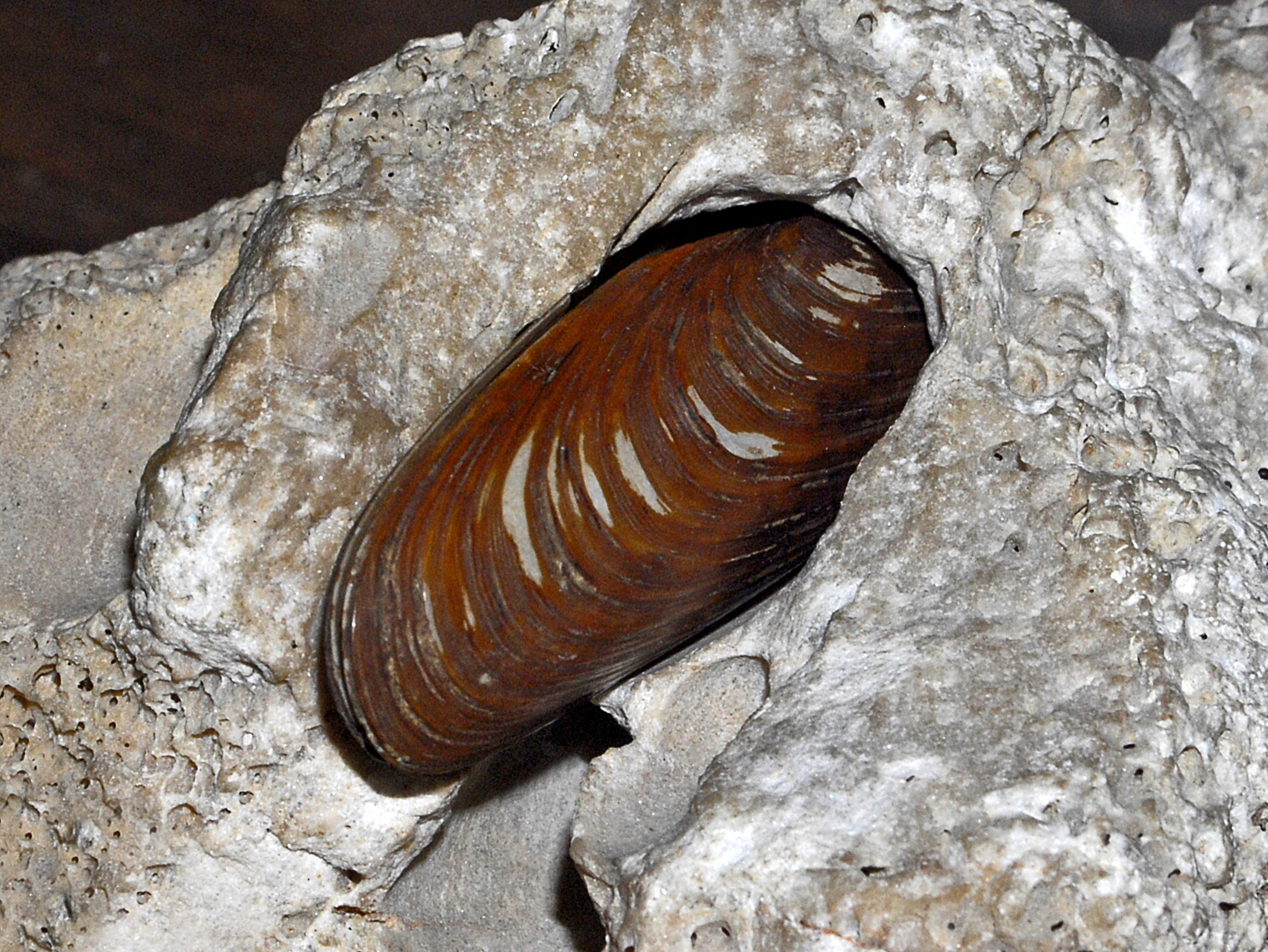
A shell of Lithophaga lithophaga

These bivalves live mainly in areas battered by waves, but they can reach depths of 125 to 200 m. They bore into marine rocks, producing a boring called Gastrochaenolites. Their growth is very slow, and to reach a 5 cm length, they require 15 to 35 years. They feed on plankton, algae and debris by filtering them from the water. They reach sexual maturity after about two years. The number of eggs that are released in a season reach about 120,000 to about 4.5 million. Fertilization takes place in the open water.

== Description ==
Shells of Lithophaga lithophaga can reach a length of about 8.5 centimetres (3.3 in). They are yellowish or brownish, almost cylindrical, rounded at both ends. The interior is whitish iridescent purple with a pink tinge. These shells are relatively thin. The surface is nearly smooth, covered with growth lines, which sometimes can be quite rough.

Right and left valve of the same specimen:

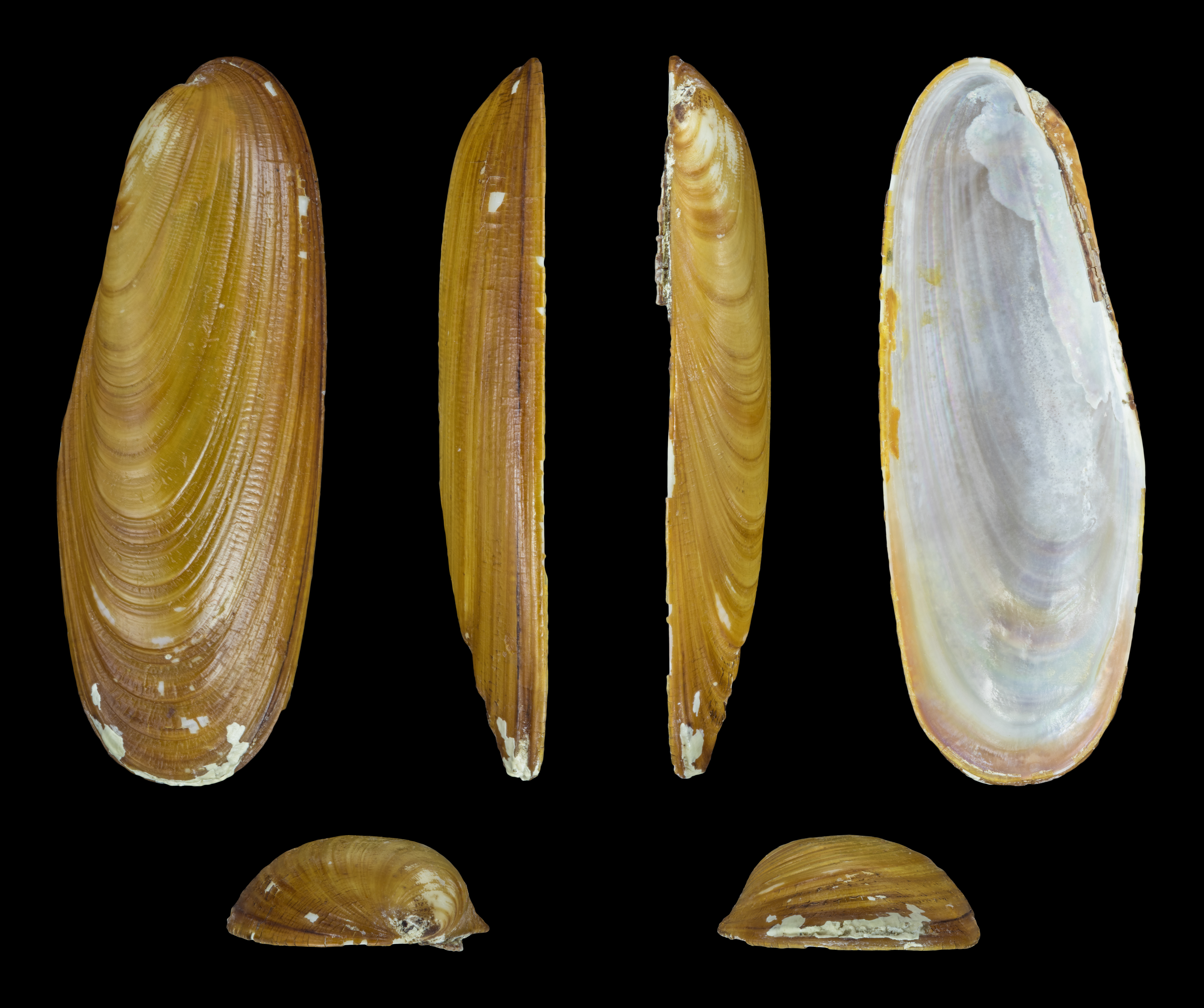
Right valve

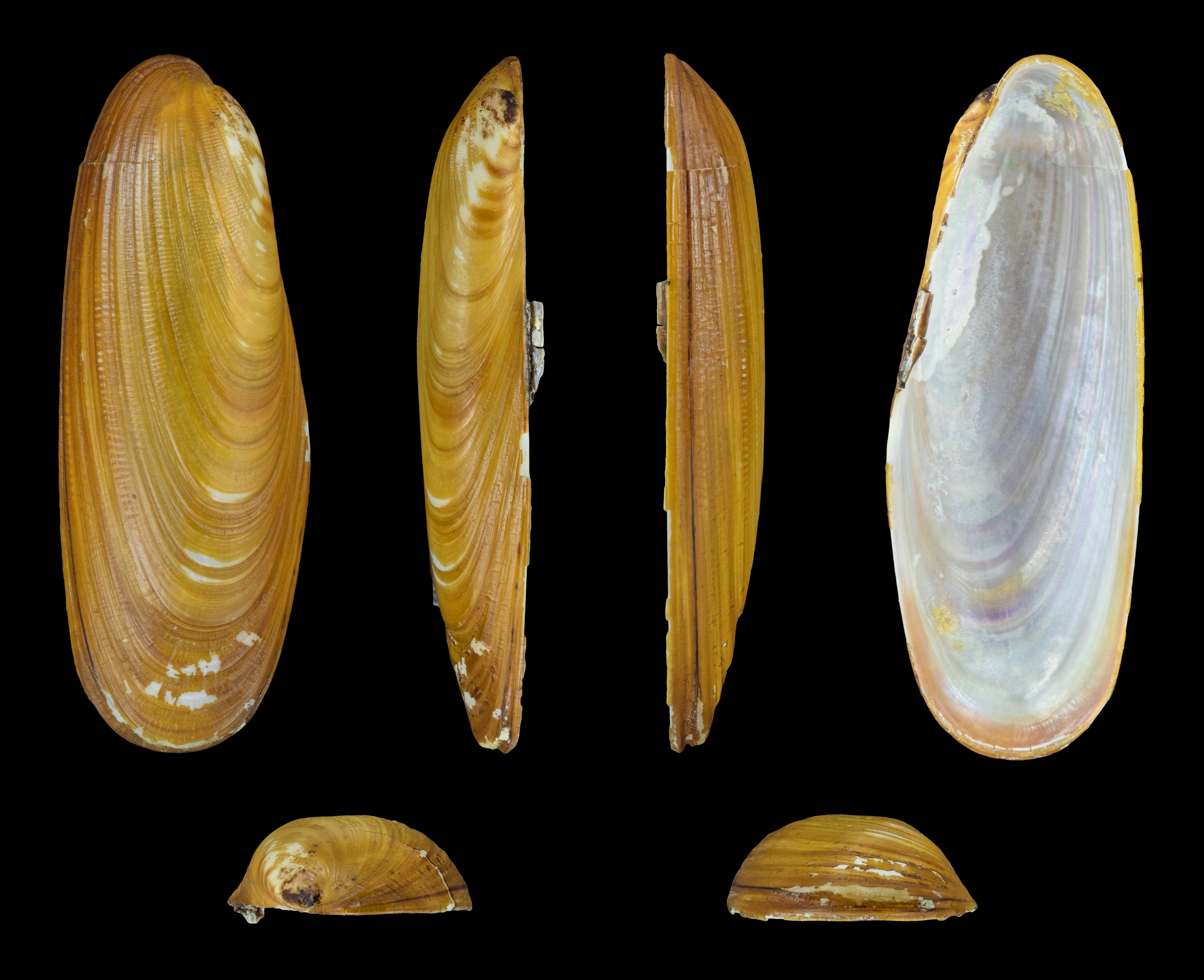
Left valve

== Etymology ==
Lithophaga lithophaga's name is derived from the Greek word lithos: meaning rock/stone and the Greek word phaga/phago: meaning to eating or devouring.

== As food ==
These mollusks have been considered a delicacy in Mediterranean cuisine; often cooked and served in a broth of white wine, garlic and parsley.

== Commercial collection ==
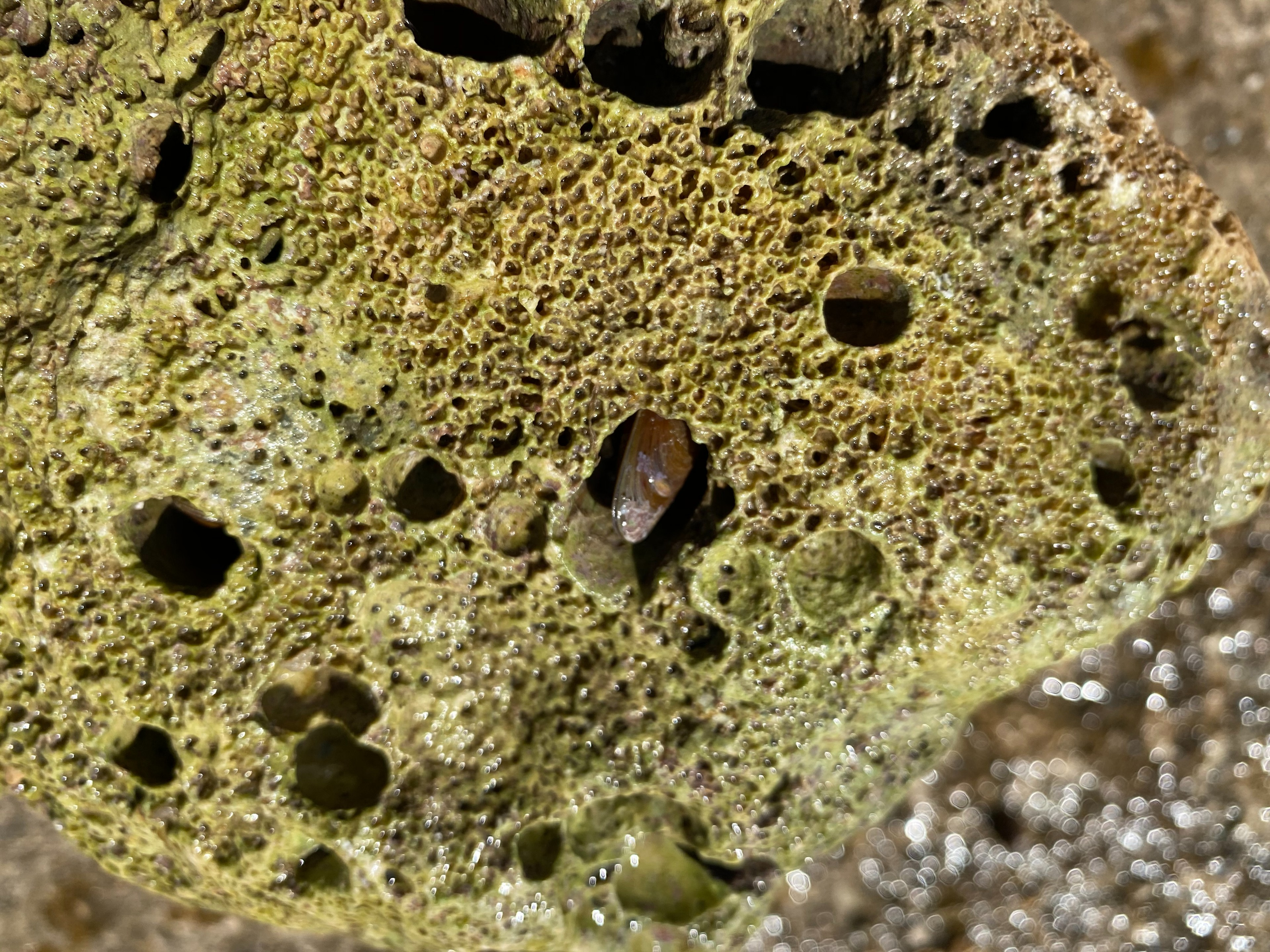
A young Lithophaga lithophaga in the beach of Valdanos, in Montenegro

The extraction of the shells require dismantling of the rocks where they live and can lead to desertification of the coast. Several governments have restricted the collection of these shells or even made it wholly illegal, in order to protect the rocks on which they are found. These countries include Croatia, Italy, Slovenia, France, Greece, Montenegro, and others, including participants in the Convention on the Conservation of European Wildlife and Natural Habitats (Bern Convention) The species is listed in Appendix II of the Convention on International Trade in Endangered Species (CITES) meaning international trade is regulated by the CITES permit system. As of 2004, its population distributed over the Turkish coastline is not considered to be under threat.
