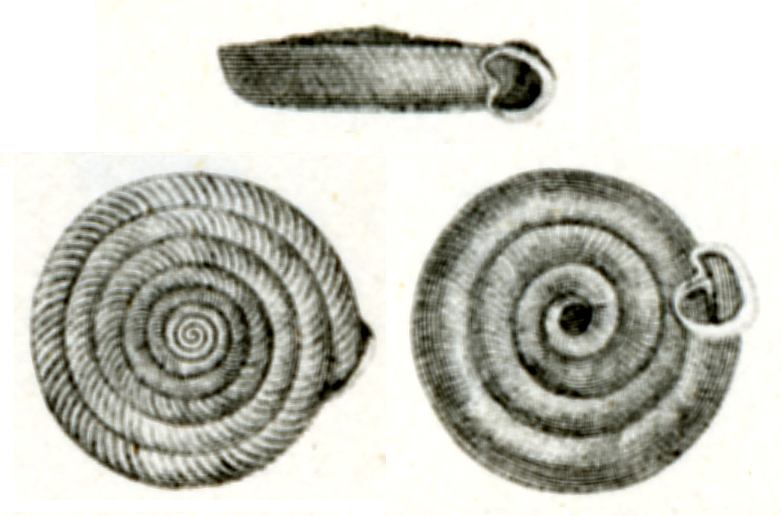
- Three views of a shell of Polygyra cereolus from W. G. Binney, 1878

Scientific classification
- Kingdom: Animalia
- Phylum: Mollusca
- Class: Gastropoda
- Order: Stylommatophora
- Family: Polygyridae
- Subfamily: Polygyrinae
- Genus: Polygyra; Say, 1818

= Polygyra =

Genus of gastropods

Polygyra is a genus of air-breathing land snails, terrestrial pulmonate gastropod molluscs in the family Polygyridae.

The two-IUCN listed taxa, Polygyra hippocrepis and Polygyra peregrina, are now usually named Daedalochila hippocrepis and Millerelix peregrina.

== Species ==
Species and subspecies in the genus Polygyra:

- Polygyra cereolus
  - Polygyra cereolus floridana
- Polygyra septemvolva
  - Polygyra septemvolva febigeri
  - Polygyra septemvolva volvoxis

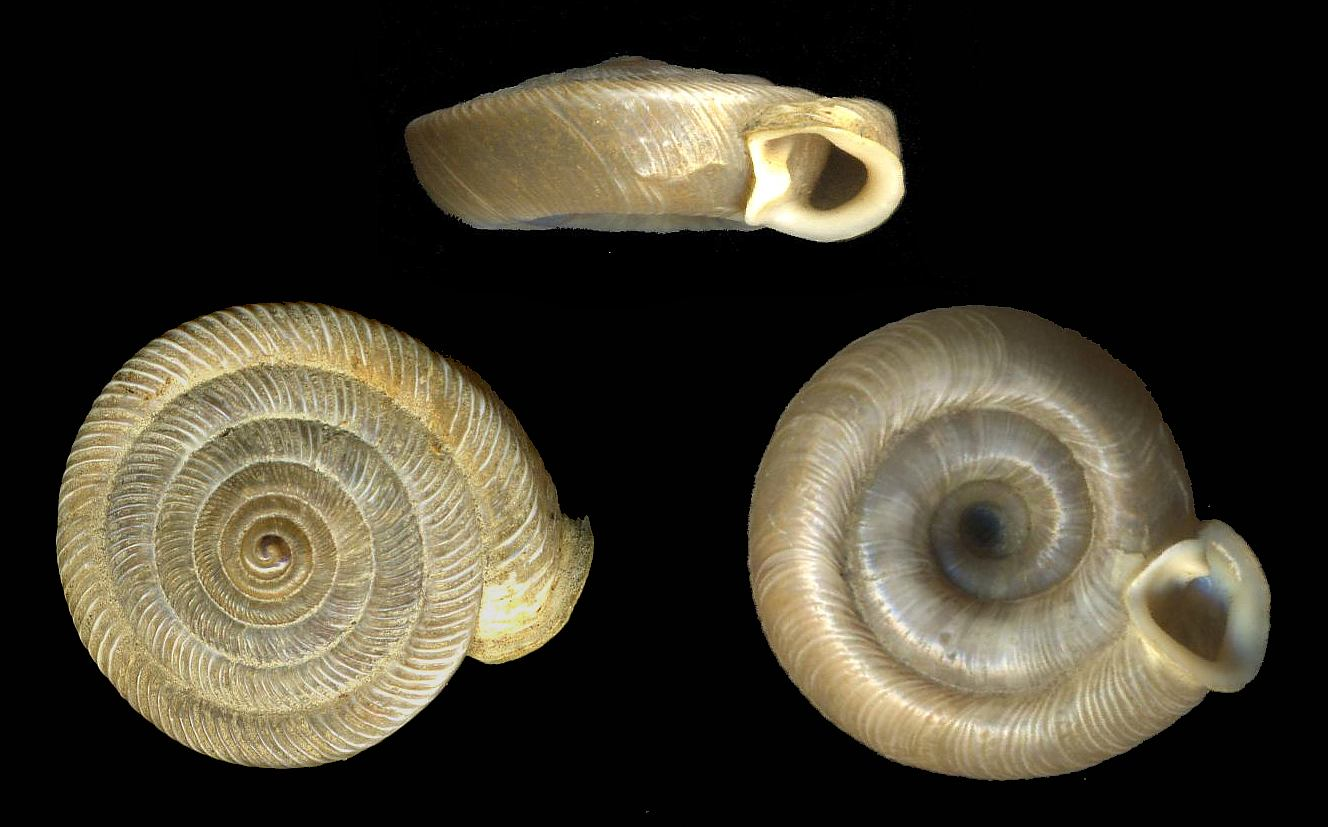
Three views of a shell of Polygyra septemvolva volvoxis.
