= Astreopora scabra =

Conservation status
- Least Concern (IUCN 3.1)

Scientific classification
- Kingdom: Animalia
- Phylum: Cnidaria
- Subphylum: Anthozoa
- Class: Hexacorallia
- Order: Scleractinia
- Family: Acroporidae
- Genus: Astreopora
- Species: A. scabra

Binomial name
- Astreopora scabra Lamberts, 1982

Species of coral

Astreopora scabra is a species of hard coral found in Eastern Australia, the oceanic west Pacific, Micronesia, Polynesia, Papua New Guinea and American Samoa. It is an uncommon species with a relatively smaller range than many pacific coral species. The International Union for Conservation of Nature has assessed its conservation status as being of "least concern".
