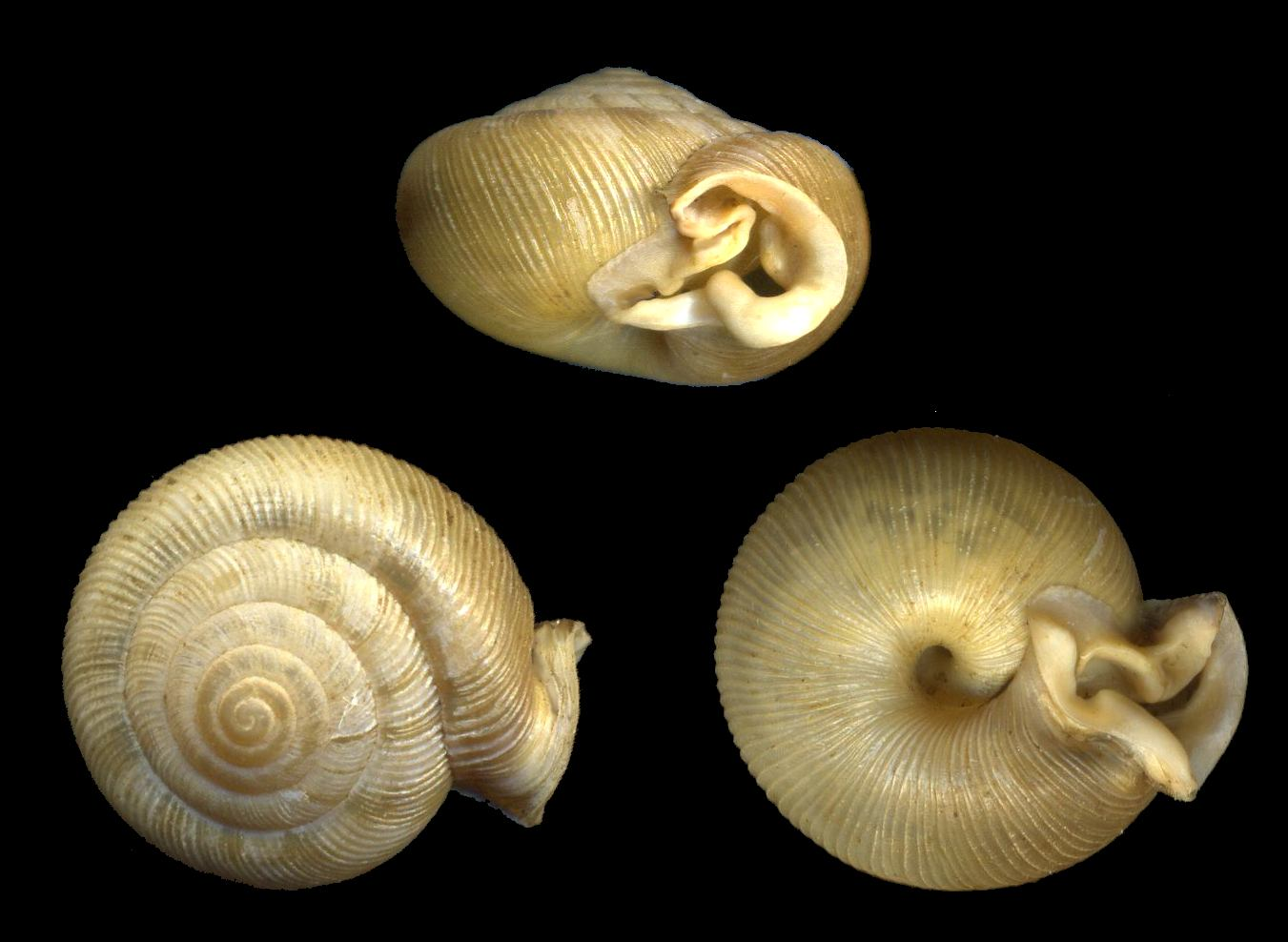
- Three views of a shell of Daedalochila uvulifera

Conservation status
- Vulnerable (NatureServe)

Scientific classification
- Kingdom: Animalia
- Phylum: Mollusca
- Class: Gastropoda
- Order: Stylommatophora
- Family: Polygyridae
- Genus: Daedalochila
- Species: D. uvulifera

Binomial name
- Daedalochila uvulifera (Shuttleworth, 1852)

= Daedalochila uvulifera =

Species of gastropod

Daedalochila uvulifera, common name the peninsula liptooth, is a species of air-breathing land snail, a terrestrial pulmonate gastropod mollusk in the family Polygyridae.

== Subspecies ==
- Daedalochila uvulifera bicornuta
- Daedalochila uvulifera margueritae
- Daedalochila uvulifera striata
