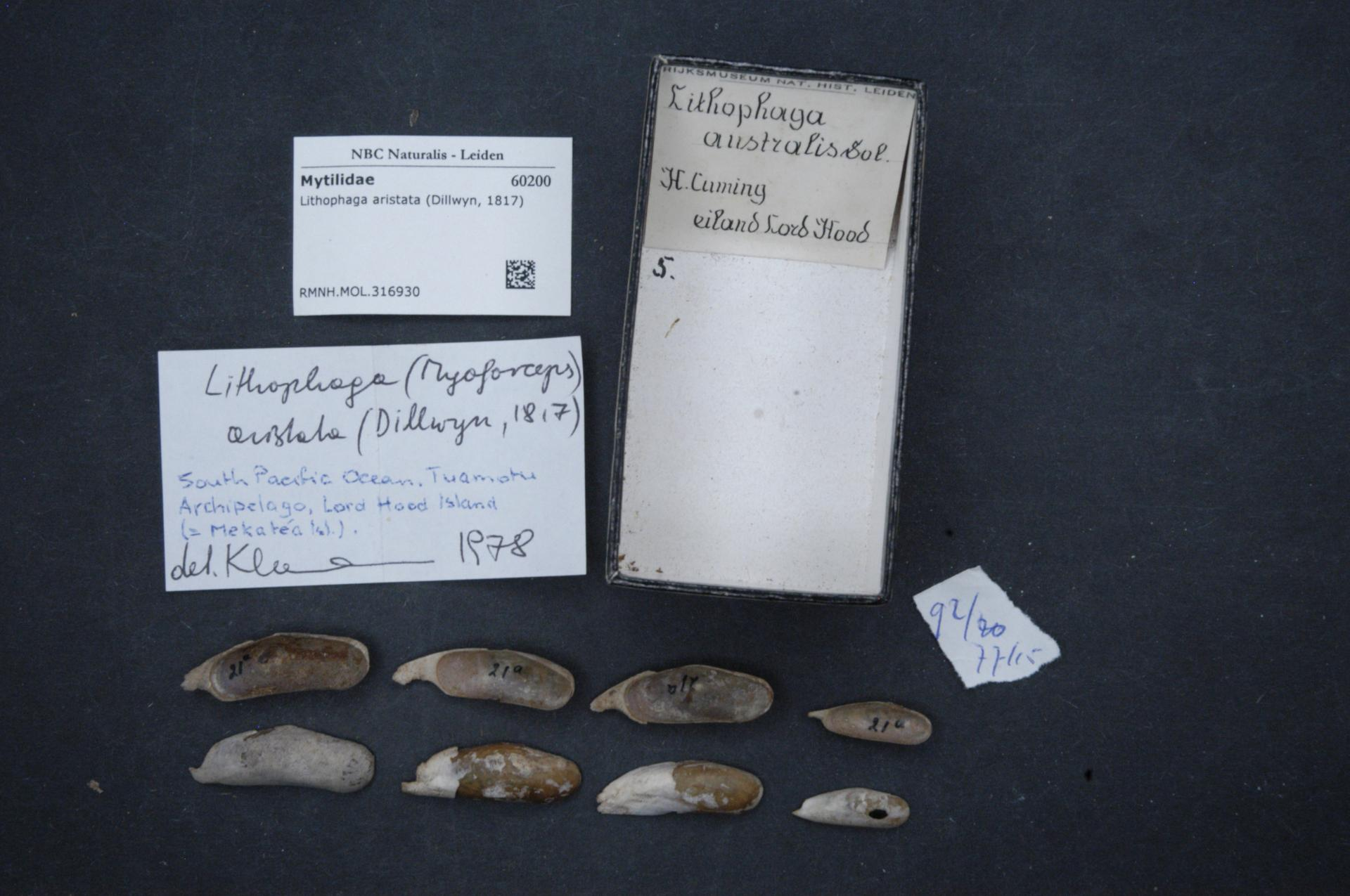

Scientific classification
- Kingdom: Animalia
- Phylum: Mollusca
- Class: Bivalvia
- Order: Mytilida
- Family: Mytilidae
- Genus: Lithophaga
- Species: L. aristata

Binomial name
- Lithophaga aristata (Dillwyn, 1817)

Synonyms
- Leiosolenus aristatus (Dillwyn, 1817); Mytilus aristatus Dillwyn, 1817

= Lithophaga aristata =

Species of bivalve

Lithophaga aristata, or the Scissor date mussel, is a species of bivalve mollusc in the family Mytilidae. It can be found along the Atlantic coast of North America, ranging from North Carolina to Texas and the West Indies.

== Distribution ==
Lithophaga aristata is known from North Carolina, Florida and the Caribbean. However, it is considered an invasive species in various regions of the globe, and is believed to be mainly dispersed through ballast water. Records of its occurrence outside the native range include the Brazilian coast, in the states of Ceará, Bahia, Rio de Janeiro, São Paulo and Santa Catarina; Cape Verde (Santo Antão island); Mauritania, Senegal and Angola.
