= Lithophaga nigra =

Scientific classification
- Kingdom: Animalia
- Phylum: Mollusca
- Class: Bivalvia
- Order: Mytilida
- Family: Mytilidae
- Genus: Lithophaga
- Species: L. nigra

Binomial name
- Lithophaga nigra (Orbigny, 1842)

Species of bivalve

Lithophaga nigra, or the Black date mussel, is a species of bivalve mollusc in the family Mytilidae. It can be found along the Atlantic coast of North America, ranging from southern Florida to the West Indies.
