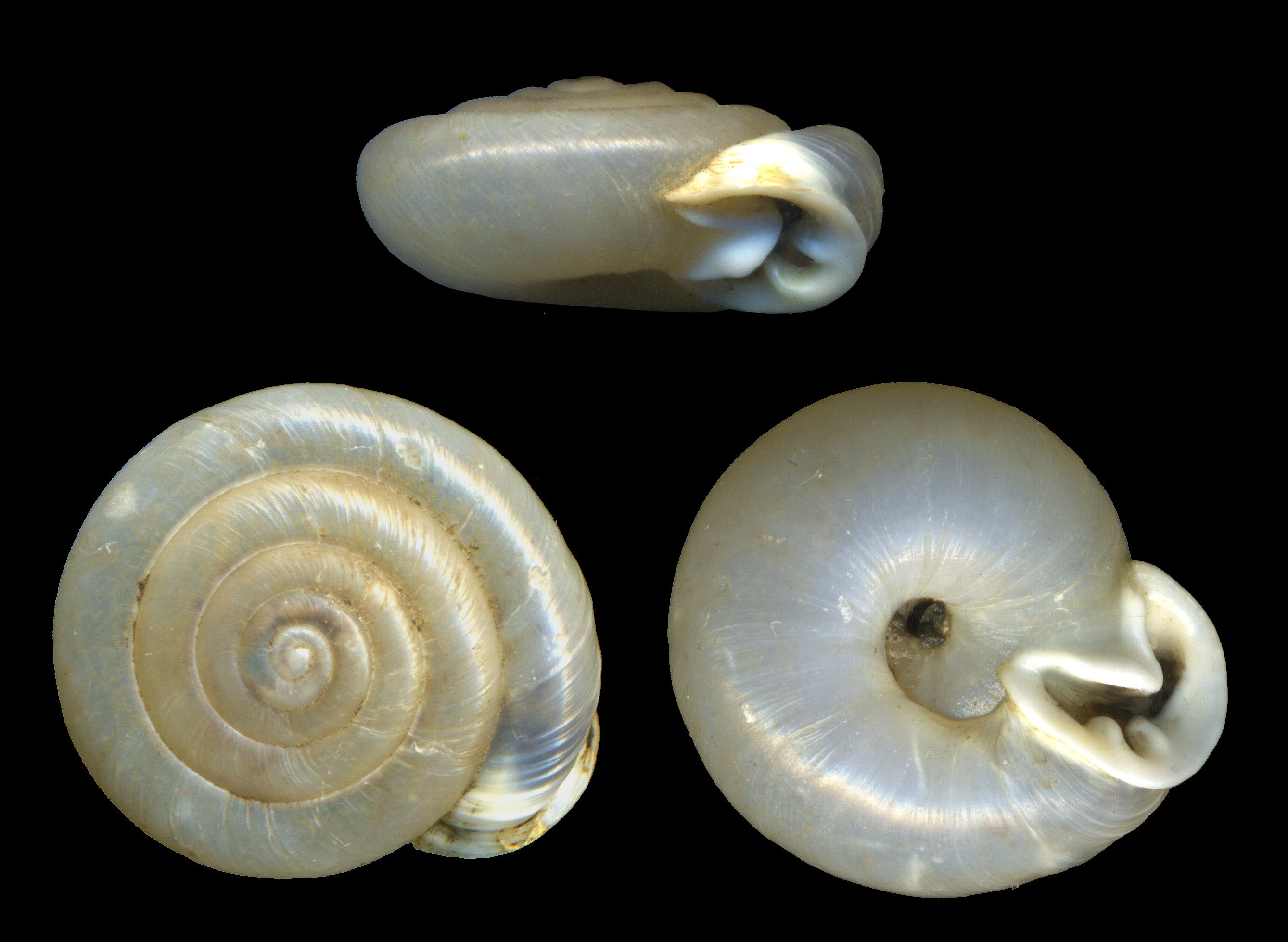
- Three views of a shell of Linisa tamaulipasensis

Conservation status
- Vulnerable (NatureServe)

Scientific classification
- Kingdom: Animalia
- Phylum: Mollusca
- Class: Gastropoda
- Order: Stylommatophora
- Family: Polygyridae
- Genus: Linisa
- Species: L. tamaulipasensis

Binomial name
- Linisa tamaulipasensis (I. Lea, 1857)

= Linisa tamaulipasensis =

Species of gastropod

Linisa tamaulipasensis is a species of air-breathing land snail, a terrestrial pulmonate gastropod mollusc in the family Polygyridae.
