= Kraussinidae =

Scientific classification
- Domain: Eukaryota
- Kingdom: Animalia
- Phylum: Brachiopoda
- Class: Rhynchonellata
- Order: Terebratulida
- Family: Kraussinidae

Family of brachiopods

Kraussinidae is a family of brachiopods belonging to the order Terebratulida.

Genera:

- Hillerella Simon, Logan & Mottequin, 2016
- Kraussina Davidson, 1859
- Lenticellaria Simon, Logan & Mottequin, 2016
- Megerella Bitner & Logan, 2016
- Megerlia King, 1850
- Megerlina Deslongchamps, 1884
- Pumilus Atkins, 1958
