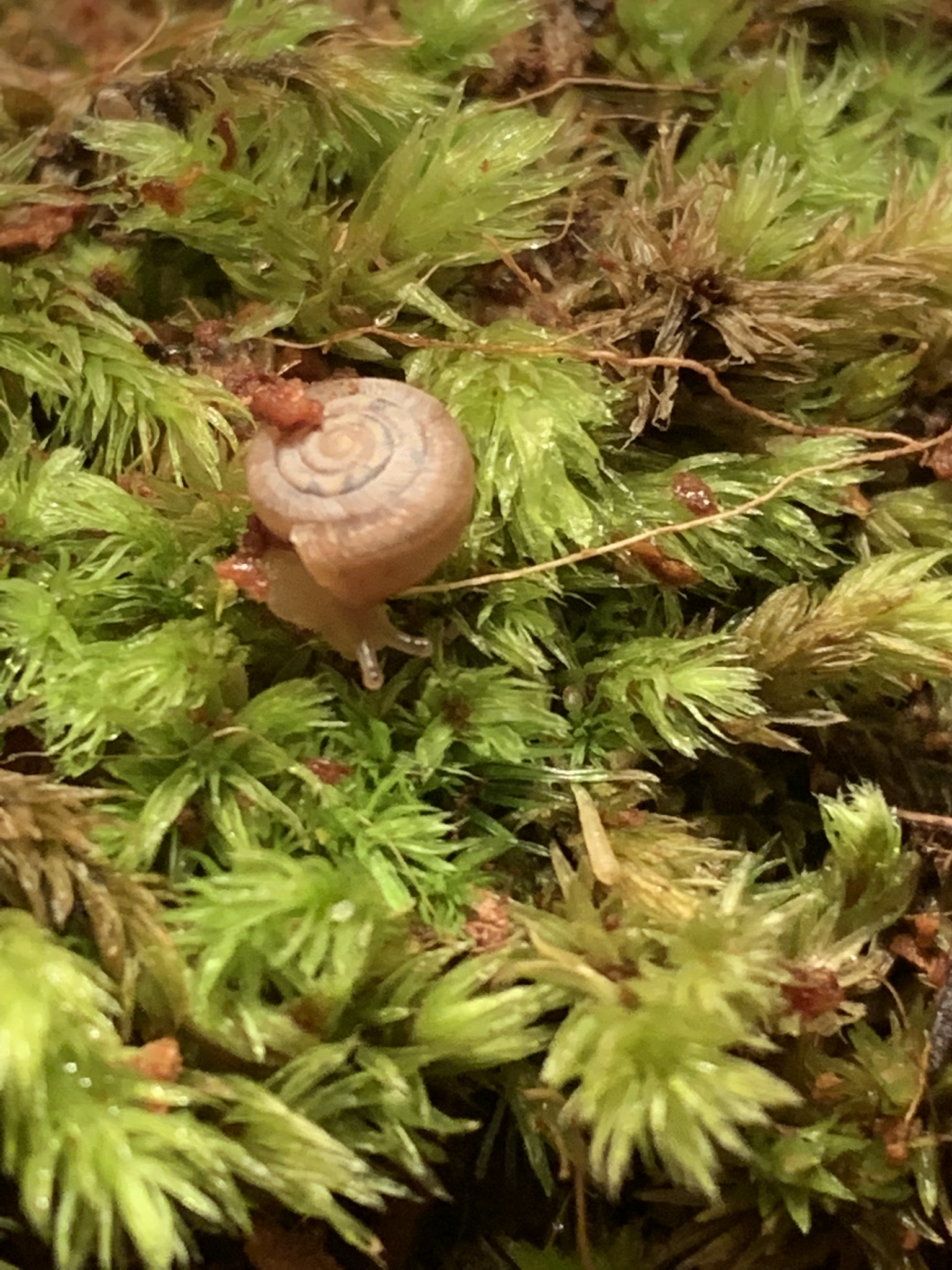
- A juvenile live individual of Polygyra septemvolva.

Conservation status
- Secure (NatureServe)

Scientific classification
- Kingdom: Animalia
- Phylum: Mollusca
- Class: Gastropoda
- Order: Stylommatophora
- Family: Polygyridae
- Genus: Polygyra
- Species: P. septemvolva

Binomial name
- Polygyra septemvolva Say, 1818

= Polygyra septemvolva =

Species of gastropod

Polygyra septemvolva, common name the Florida flatcoil, is a species of air-breathing land snail, a terrestrial gastropod mollusc in the family Polygyridae.

== Description ==
The shells of Polygyra septemvolva are known to show a high degree of variance in size within populations (6.6 - 14.8 mm). They have been proposed as a suitable model organism due to the ease of culturing and abundant reproduction in a suitable habitat.

== Subspecies ==
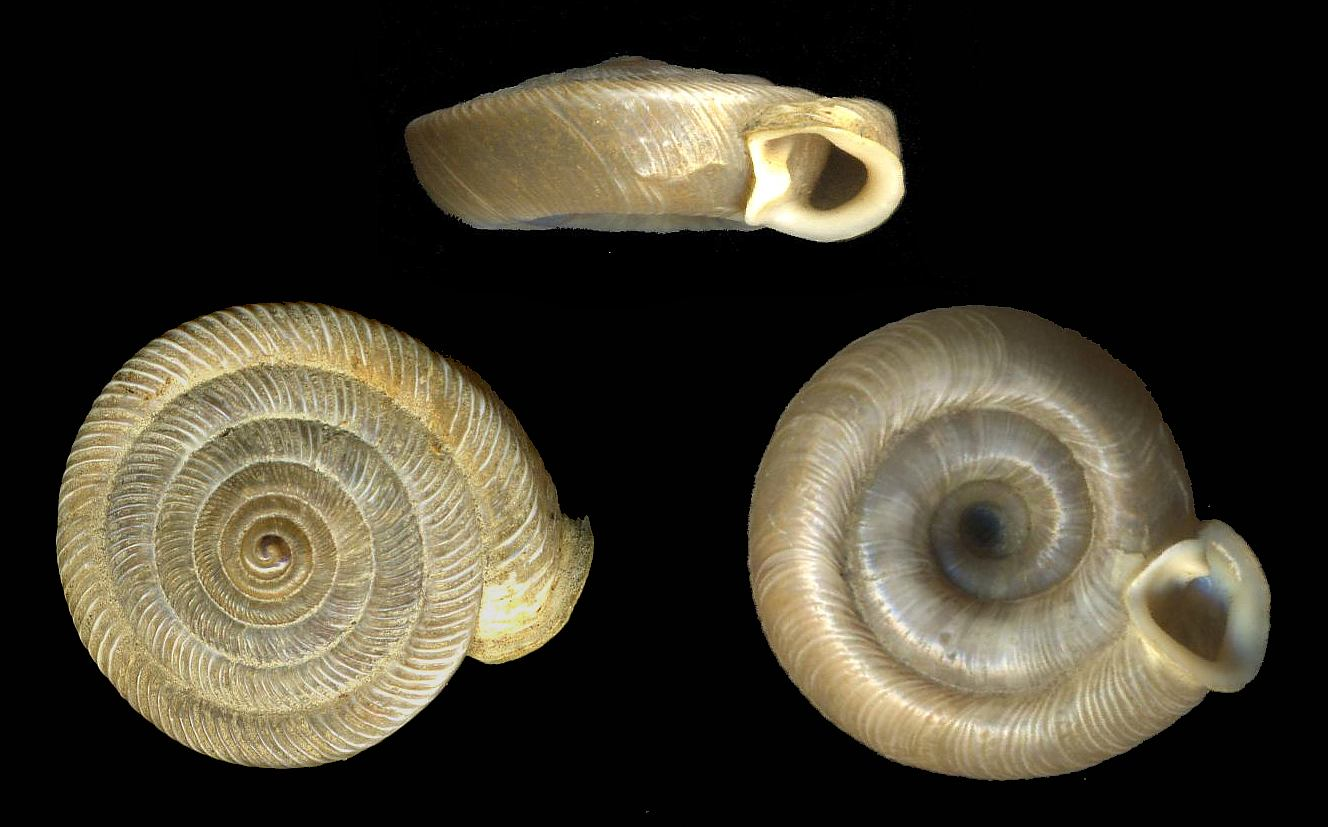
Polygyra septemvolva volvoxis

- Polygyra septemvolva febigeri
- Polygyra septemvolva volvoxis
