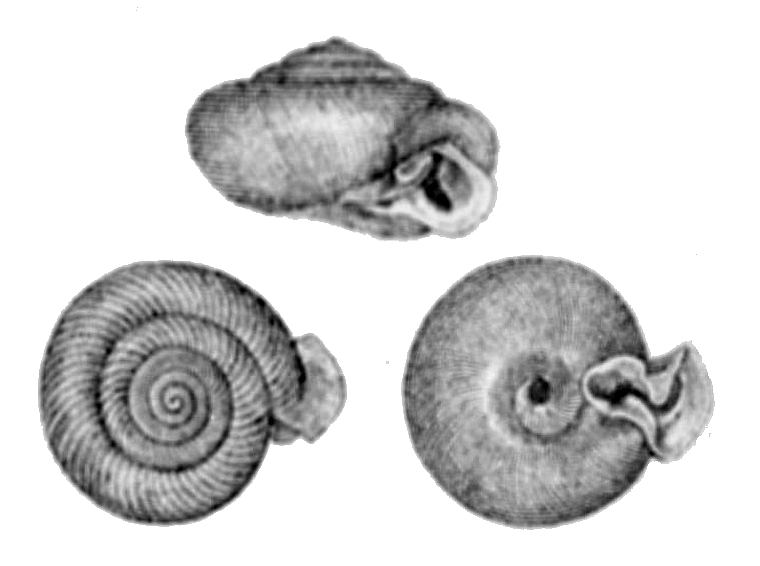
- Daedalochila auriculata from W. G. Binney, 1878

Scientific classification
- Kingdom: Animalia
- Phylum: Mollusca
- Class: Gastropoda
- Order: Stylommatophora
- Family: Polygyridae
- Genus: Daedalochila; Beck, 1837

= Daedalochila =

Genus of gastropods

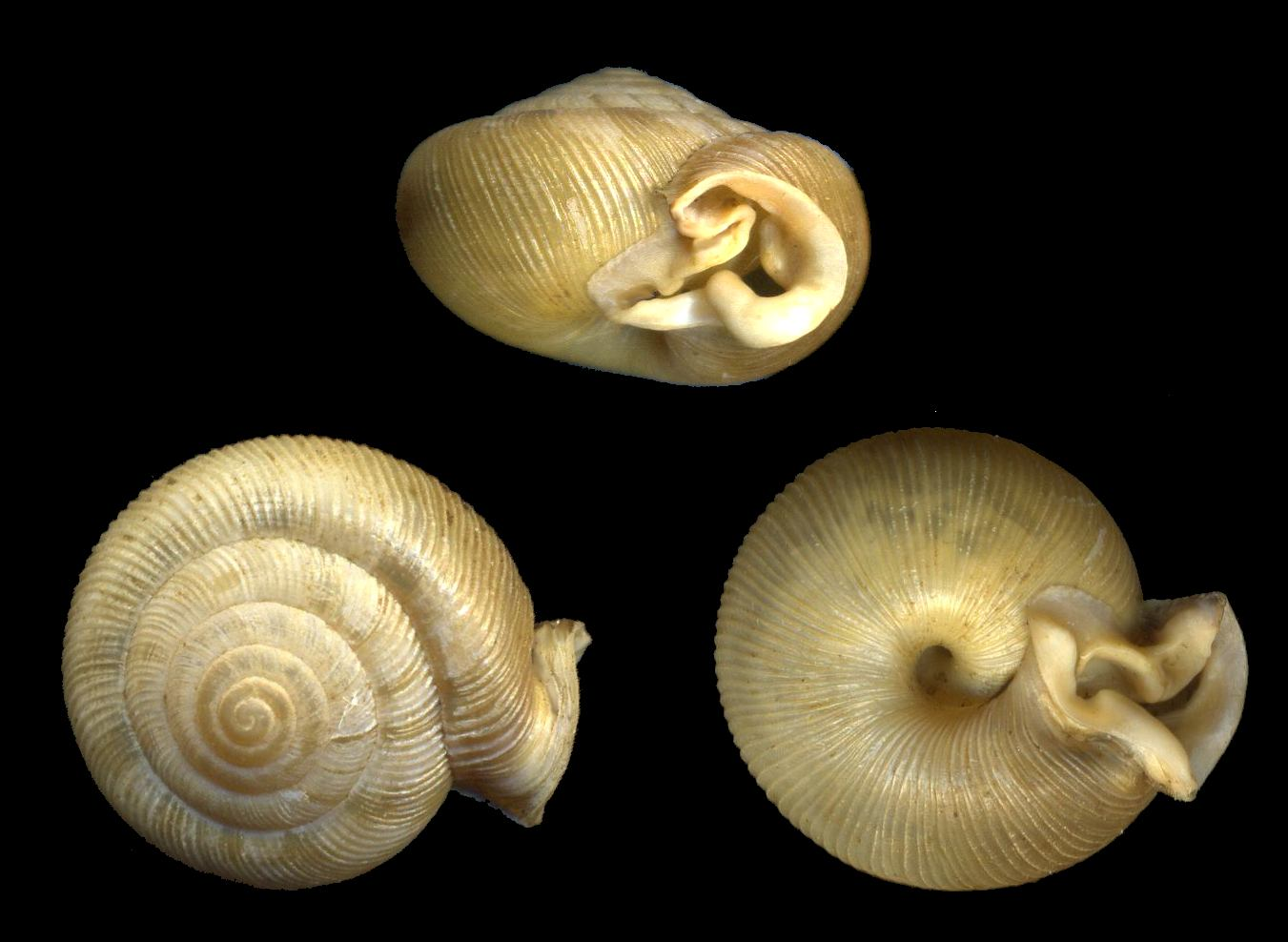
Daedalochila uvulifera.

Daedalochila is a genus of air-breathing land snails, terrestrial pulmonate gastropod mollusks in the family Polygyridae.

These are small snails, only about 10 mm to 15 mm in diameter (or approximately one-half inch), notable for their elaborately convoluted apertures, with only very narrow openings. Their range is limited to the southern United States and northern Mexico.

== Species ==
This genus contains the following species and subspecies:

- Daedalochila adamnis (fossil)
- Daedalochila auriculata
- Daedalochila auriformis
- Daedalochila avara
- Daedalochila chisosensis
- Daedalochila delecta
- Daedalochila hausmani
- Daedalochila hippocrepis
- Daedalochila oppilata
- Daedalochila postelliana
  - Daedalochila postelliana carolina
  - Daedalochila postelliana espiloca
  - Daedalochila postelliana peninsulae
  - Daedalochila postelliana subclausa
- Daedalochila scintilla
- Daedalochila troostiana*
- Daedalochila uvulifera
  - Daedalochila uvulifera bicornuta
  - Daedalochila uvulifera margueritae
  - Daedalochila uvulifera striata
