= Lithophaga bisulcata =

Scientific classification
- Kingdom: Animalia
- Phylum: Mollusca
- Class: Bivalvia
- Order: Mytilida
- Family: Mytilidae
- Genus: Lithophaga
- Species: L. bisulcata

Binomial name
- Lithophaga bisulcata (Orbigny, 1842)

Species of bivalve

Lithophaga bisulcata, or the Mahogany date mussel, is a species of bivalve mollusc in the family Mytilidae. It can be found along the Atlantic coast of North America, ranging from North Carolina to the West Indies and Bermuda.
