= Megerlina =

Scientific classification
- Domain: Eukaryota
- Kingdom: Animalia
- Phylum: Brachiopoda
- Class: Rhynchonellata
- Order: Terebratulida
- Family: Kraussinidae
- Genus: Megerlina; Deslongchamps, 1884

Genus of brachiopods

Megerlina is a genus of brachiopods belonging to the family Kraussinidae.

The species of this genus are found in Australia, Southern Africa.

Species:

- Megerlina atkinosni Woods, 1878
- Megerlina atkinsoni (Woods, 1878)
- Megerlina capensis (Adams & Reeve, 1850)
- Megerlina davidsoni (Vélain, 1877)
- Megerlina dorothyae Craig, 1999
- Megerlina irenae Craig, 1999
- Megerlina lamarckiana (Davidson, 1852)
- Megerlina miracula Hiller, 2008
- Megerlina natalensis (Krauss, 1843)
- Megerlina pisum (Lamarck, 1819)
- Megerlina striata Jackson, 1952
