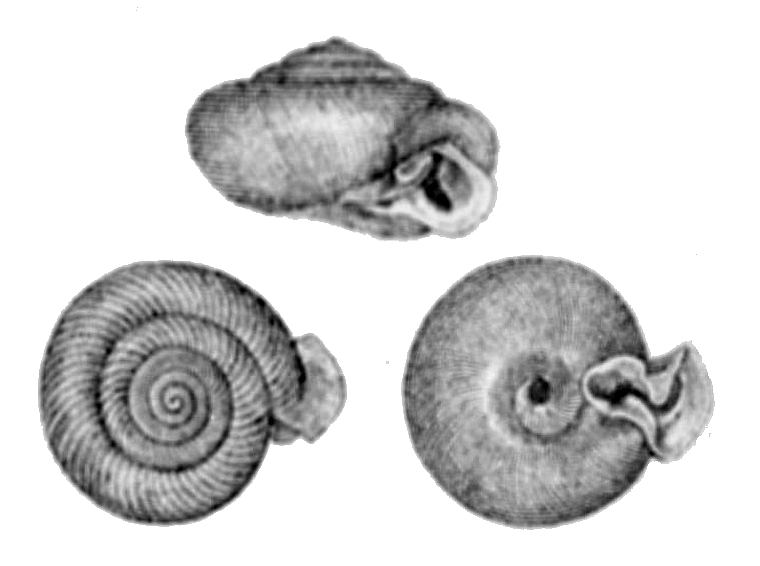
- Daedalochila auriculata from W. G. Binney, 1878

Conservation status
- Vulnerable (NatureServe)

Scientific classification
- Kingdom: Animalia
- Phylum: Mollusca
- Class: Gastropoda
- Order: Stylommatophora
- Family: Polygyridae
- Genus: Daedalochila
- Species: D. auriculata

Binomial name
- Daedalochila auriculata (Say, 1818)

= Daedalochila auriculata =

Species of gastropod

Daedalochila auriculata is a species of air-breathing land snail, a terrestrial pulmonate gastropod mollusc in the family Polygyridae.
