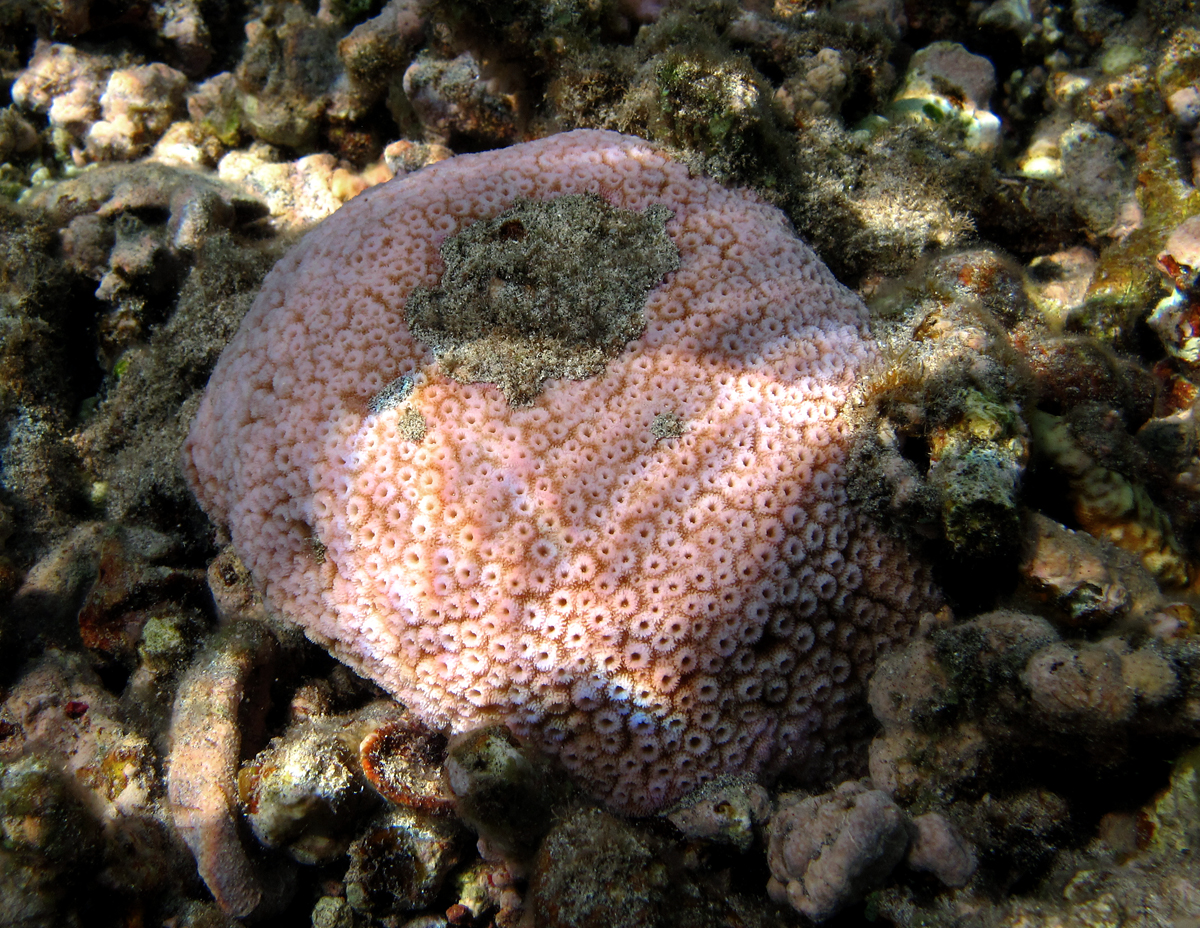

Conservation status
- Endangered (IUCN 3.1)

Scientific classification
- Kingdom: Animalia
- Phylum: Cnidaria
- Subphylum: Anthozoa
- Class: Hexacorallia
- Order: Scleractinia
- Family: Acroporidae
- Genus: Astreopora
- Species: A. listeri

Binomial name
- Astreopora listeri Bernard, 1896

Synonyms
- Astreopora hirsuta Bernard, 1896; Astreopora horizontalis Bernard, 1896

= Astreopora listeri =

Species of coral

Astreopora listeri is a species of hard coral found in shallow water in the tropical Indian and Pacific Oceans. It is an uncommon species with a wide range and is tolerant of turbid water, making it more resilient than some other corals to habitat disturbance. The International Union for Conservation of Nature has assessed its conservation status as being of "least concern".

== Description ==
Astreopora listeri may form hemispherical mounds or flattened and partially encrusting colonies. The corallites are crowded and not arranged in any particular pattern. They are immersed and have small circular openings surrounded by delicate feathery spinules, giving the colony a rough surface. This coral resembles Astreopora myriophthalma and Astreopora randalli in appearance and is usually cream, pale brown or grey.

== Distribution and habitat ==
Astreopora listeri is widely distributed in the tropical Indo-Pacific region. Its range extends from Madagascar and East Africa to Indonesia and eastern Australia. It is found in several different types of shallow water reef habitat including turbid areas, at depths between 5 and 20 m (16 and 66 ft).

== Ecology ==
Astreopora listeri is a zooxanthellate species of coral, harbouring symbiotic dinoflagellates which provide their host with the products of photosynthesis. This coral is sometimes host to the bio-eroding demosponge Cliona orientalis which attacks various calcareous substrates including corals and weakens their structure.

== Status ==
The greatest threats faced by corals are loss of habitat and global climate change. The specific threats faced by this species are unknown, but the genus is susceptible to bleaching and coral diseases. However, this is a widespread species, with a presumed large total population which is tolerant of turbid conditions, and the International Union for Conservation of Nature has assessed its conservation status as being of "least concern".
