= Therese Megerle von Mühlfeld =

Austrian writer, translator and dramatist

- Born: 1813; Preßburg, Kingdom of Hungary
- Died: 4 July 1865 (aged 51–52)
- Occupations: Dramatist, writer, translator
- Spouse: Georg Megerle von Mühlfeld (m. 1829)

Therese Megerle von Mühlfeld (born Therese Pop(p) von Popenburg; 1813 - 4 July 1865) was an Austrian writer and translator (from French and English) who came to prominence, primarily, as a dramatist.

== Life ==
Therese Pop was born in Preßburg, the daughter of a Hungarian landowner. She was only 16 when in 1829 she married Georg Johann Wilhelm Megerle von Mühlfeld, a surgeon and dentist, in Preßburg. She came to the marriage with 60,000 florins, which was a very substantial dowry. It enabled him to abandon his medical work and take over the city theatre. Later, in 1850, he took over at the Theater in der Josefstadt on the western side of Vienna. The Josefstadt theatre was well established and apparently busy during the four years he spent there. Due to his lack of business acumen, and partly bad luck, he lost all his and his wife's money. After becoming bankrupt, Megerle died. The 19th century Biographical Encyclopedia of the Austrian Empire states that it was said that he left her nothing but a suit.

Despite her grief, Therese set about building herself a career as a dramatist. She had already begun to establish herself as a writer, with novellas and short stories published in magazines or journals such as Sonntagsblätter and Ludwig Augustus Frankl's Abendzeitung, and was thereby met with modest success. A collection of her pieces was published in three volumes in 1844 under the title Novellen und Erzählungen (Novellas and stories). One critic described it as "very entertaining, full of life and action". Her novel Die beiden Graßel (The two Grassels) had no fewer than five editions as well as a stage adaptation, which she herself wrote. In 1848, it ran for 80 successive nights. She became progressively more prolific as a dramatist, and began to adapt English and French novels, producing more than 50 stage works pieces. However, a critic argued that her output was devoid of artistic worth.

== Selected works ==
Her plays included:

- Ein gebrochenes Wort. Volksstück (lit. trans.: A broken promise. Popular piece) - premiered at the Theater in der Josefstadt in Vienna, 17 September 1859
- Die Armen und Elenden, Bilder aus dem französischen Volksleben (lit. trans. The poor and destitute, images from French common life - based on Les Misérables, it premiered at Thalia Theatre in Vienna, 29 May 1863
- Novara. Bilder aus dem italienischen Feldzuge von 1849 (Pictures from the Italian campaign of 1849) - premiered at Thalia Theatre in Vienna, 13 September 1863
- Maledetta, der Bandit von Frascati. Spectakelschauspiel (lit. trans. Maldetta, the bandit of Frascati. Spectacular - premiered at Thalia Theatre in Vienna, 30 September 1863
- Nach achtzehn Jahren. Volksstück (lit. trans. After eighteen years. Popular piece) - premiered at Theater in der Josefstadt in Vienna, 8 December 1863
- Die Regentrude und das Feuerwichtel. Phantastisches Märchen (lit. trans. The Rain Maiden and the Fire Imp. Fantastical folk tale) - premiered at Theater in der Josefstadt in Vienna, 24 March 1865

Her final piece was called Die Eselshaut ("The donkey skin"), a reworking from a French piece, for which authorship was attributed to her son, Julius.
