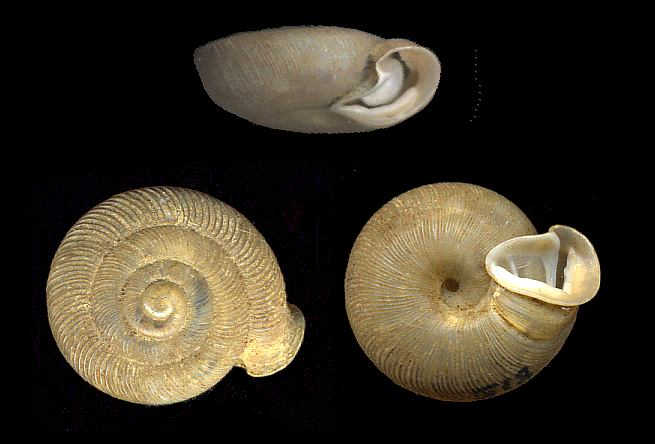
- Three views of a shell of Daedalochila hippocrepis

Conservation status
- Critically Imperiled (NatureServe)

Scientific classification
- Kingdom: Animalia
- Phylum: Mollusca
- Class: Gastropoda
- Order: Stylommatophora
- Family: Polygyridae
- Genus: Daedalochila
- Species: D. hippocrepis

Binomial name
- Daedalochila hippocrepis (L. Pfeiffer, 1848)

Synonyms
- Polygyra hippocrepis (L. Pfeiffer, 1848)

= Daedalochila hippocrepis =

Species of gastropod

Daedalochila hippocrepis is a species of air-breathing land snail, a terrestrial pulmonate gastropod mollusc in the family Polygyridae.

This species is endemic to the state of Texas in the United States. The diameter of the adult shell is about 1 cm (0.4 in).
