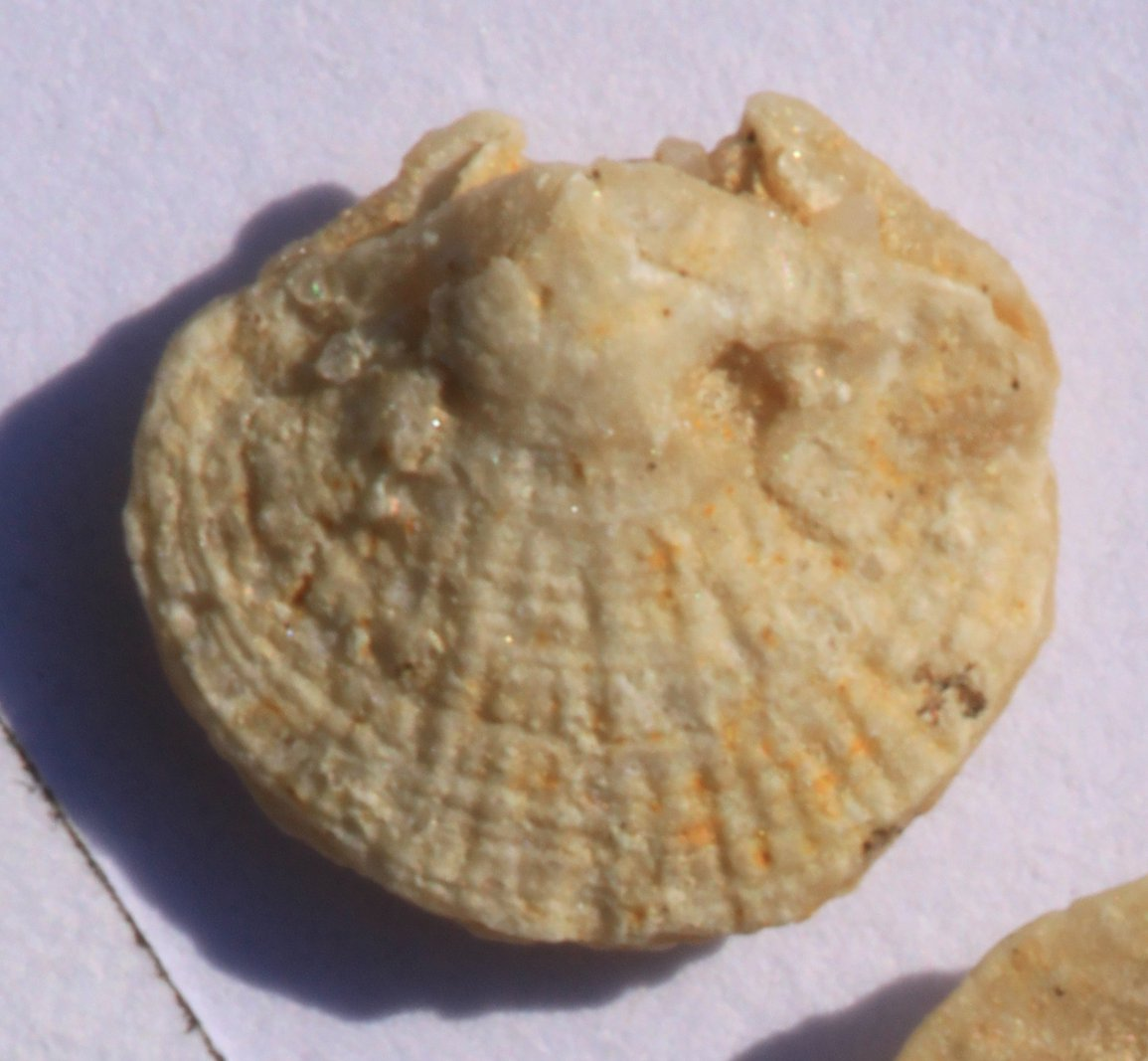
- Megerlia truncata lampshell, collected in Poland

Scientific classification
- Domain: Eukaryota
- Kingdom: Animalia
- Phylum: Brachiopoda
- Class: Rhynchonellata
- Order: Terebratulida
- Family: Kraussinidae
- Genus: Megerlia; King, 1850

= Megerlia =

Genus of brachiopods

Megerlia is a genus of brachiopods belonging to the family Kraussinidae.

The species of this genus are found in Europe and Africa.

Species:

- Megerlia acrura Hiller, 1986
- Megerlia granosa Seguenza, 1865
- Megerlia truncata (Linnaeus, 1767)
- Megerlia willemoesi Davidson, 1878
