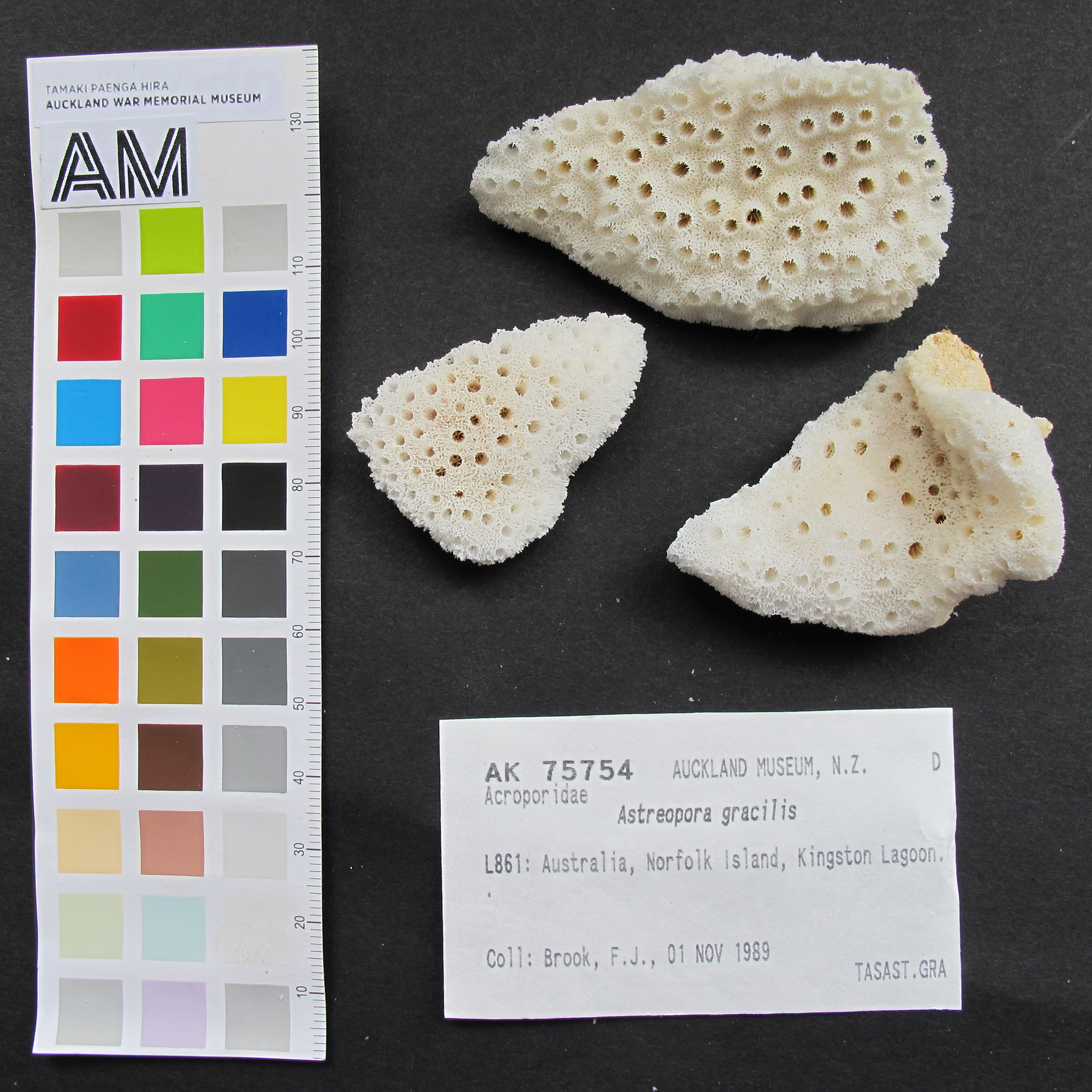

Conservation status
- Least Concern (IUCN 3.1)

Scientific classification
- Kingdom: Animalia
- Phylum: Cnidaria
- Subphylum: Anthozoa
- Class: Hexacorallia
- Order: Scleractinia
- Family: Acroporidae
- Genus: Astreopora
- Species: A. gracilis

Binomial name
- Astreopora gracilis Bernard, 1896

= Astreopora gracilis =

Species of coral

Astreopora gracilis is a species of hard coral found in shallow water in the tropical Indian and Pacific Oceans. It is an uncommon species with a wide range and the International Union for Conservation of Nature has assessed its conservation status as being of "least concern".
