= Strange many-whorled land snail =

Conservation status
- Near Threatened (IUCN 2.3)

Scientific classification
- Kingdom: Animalia
- Phylum: Mollusca
- Class: Gastropoda
- Order: Stylommatophora
- Family: Polygyridae
- Genus: Millerelix
- Species: M. peregrina

Binomial name
- Millerelix peregrina (Rehder, 1932)

Species of gastropod

Millerelix peregrina (syn. Polygyra peregrina) is a species of land snail in the family Polygyridae. It is known by the common names strange many-whorled land snail and white liptooth. It is endemic to Arkansas in the United States, where it is found in Izard, Marion, Stone, Newton, and Searcy County in the Ozark Mountains. It occurs in dolomite cliff habitat.
