= Johann Carl Megerle von Mühlfeld =

Austrian naturalist (1765–1840)

Johann Carl Megerle von Mühlfeld (1765 – 12 September 1840) was an Austrian naturalist who served as the first curator of insects at the Imperial Natural History Cabinet in Vienna. He took a special interest in molluscs. The genus Megerlia is named after him.

== Life ==
Megerle was born in 1765. He was the son of Johann Baptist Megerle (1742–1813) who was ennobled as von Mühlfeld in 1803, and an older brother of fellow naturalist Johann Georg Megerle von Mühlfeld. He collected natural history specimens which he sold to the Imperial Natural History Cabinet in 1808. He worked at the cabinet from 1786 in an honorary position along with Andreas Xaverius Stütz and in 1792 he became a custodian for the mineral collection. In 1797 he became the first curator of insects. From 1798 to 1806 he was involved in trading natural history specimens at the Bürgerspital. He named insects in the catalogues of the auction but these names are not to be used for taxonomic purposes. He collected insects and minerals both on his own and through purchases. From 1826 to 1840 he also managed an amateur theatre Mühlfeldtheater in Gentzgasse, Vienna. He worked at the Naturhistorisches Museum, Wien, until his retirement in 1835.

Among the taxa Mergerle von Mühlfeld described are:

- Melolontha pectoralis, a kind of cockchafer beetle
- The bivalve genera Angulus, Chione and Corbicula, all in 1811
- The snail species Helix perspectiva in 1816 (now known as Discus perspectivus).

The brachiopod genus Megerlia King, 1850 is named after him, as well as the odostomiine snail species Odostomia megerlei Locard, 1886.

His manuscripts are held at the Staatsbibliothek zu Berlin.
