= Johann Georg Megerle von Mühlfeld =

Austrian naturalist

Johann Georg Megerle von Mühlfeld (July 22, 1780 in Vienna – September 15, 1831, also in Vienna) was an Austrian naturalist. He was the younger brother of fellow naturalist Johann Carl Megerle von Mühlfeld, sons of Johann Baptist Megerle who got ennobled as von Mühlfeld in 1803.

From 1802 on Johann Georg worked as the curator's assistant at the entomological collection of the Natural-Animal Cabinet in Vienna. He later became an official in the administration.

He published the Mineralogical Pocket Book (Mineralogisches Taschenbuch, enthaltend eine Oryctographie von Unterösterreich zum Gebrauche reisender Mineralogen) in 1807, but abandoned mineralogy thereafter. In 1813, he published Österreichs Färbepflanzen (Austria's Dye Plants).
