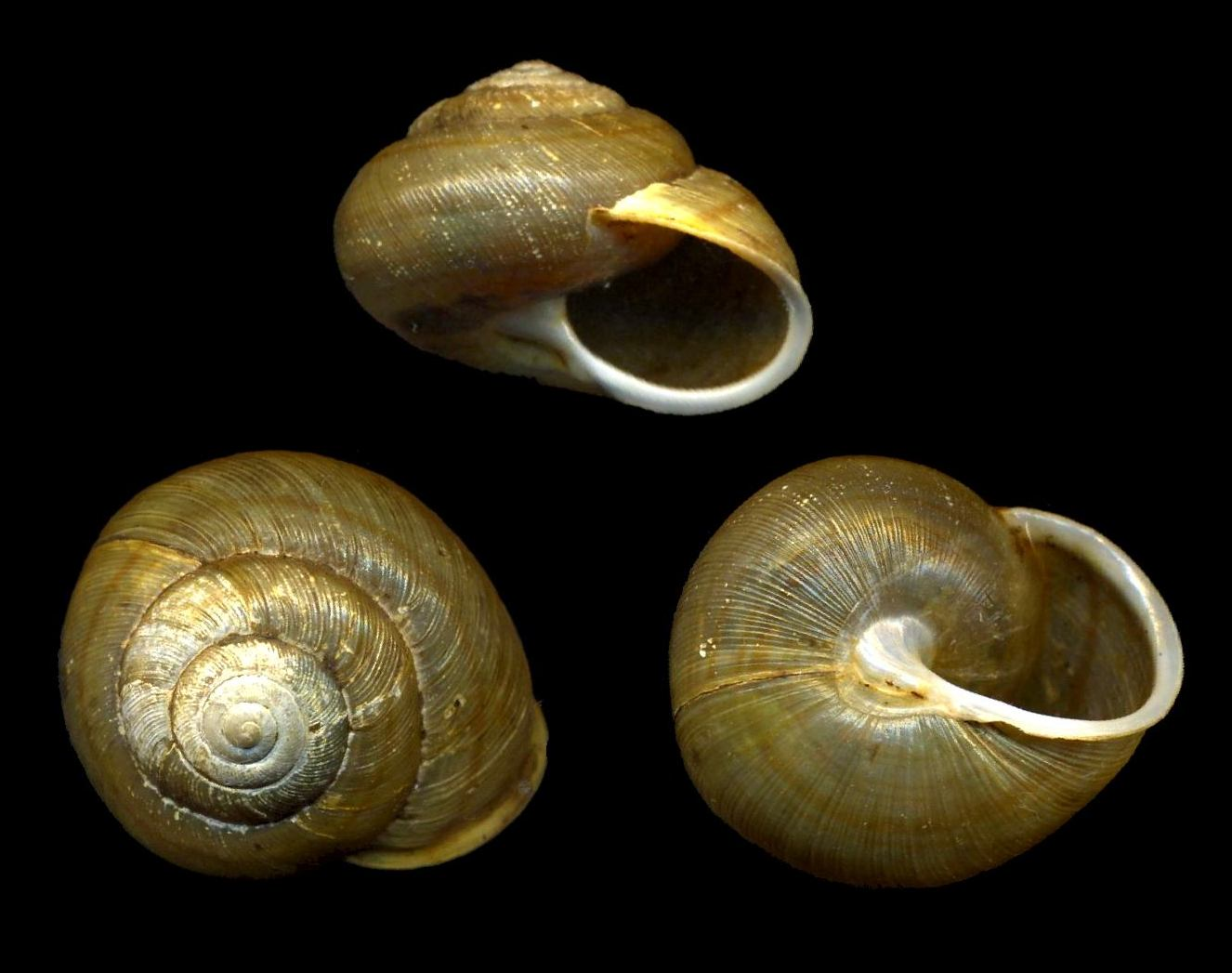
- Three views of a shell of Webbhelix multilineata

Conservation status
- Secure (NatureServe)

Scientific classification
- Kingdom: Animalia
- Phylum: Mollusca
- Class: Gastropoda
- Order: Stylommatophora
- Family: Polygyridae
- Genus: Webbhelix
- Species: W. multilineata

Binomial name
- Webbhelix multilineata (Say, 1821)

= Webbhelix multilineata =

Species of gastropod

Webbhelix multilineata is a species of air-breathing land snail, a terrestrial pulmonate gastropod mollusk in the family Polygyridae.
