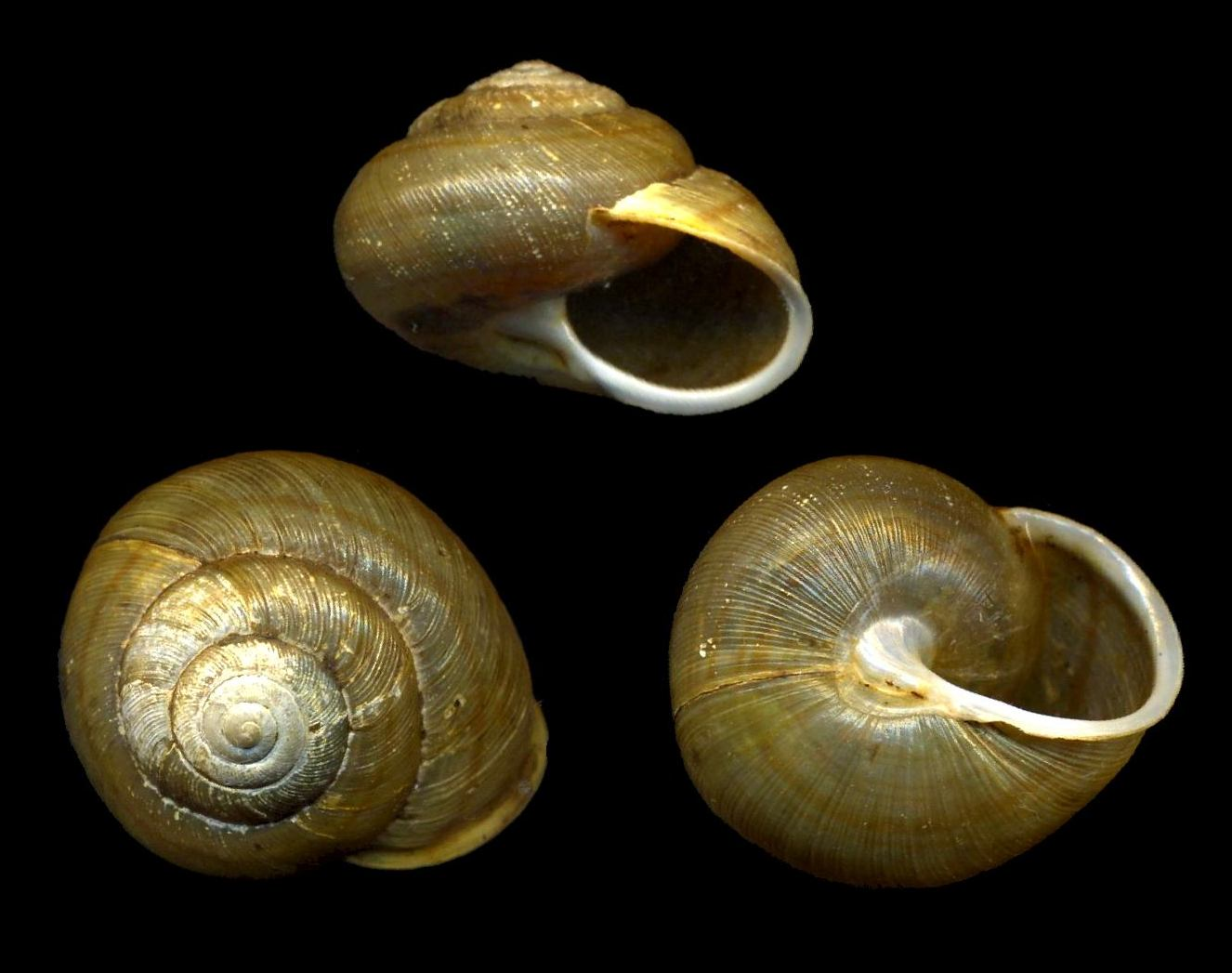
- Three views of a shell of Webbhelix multilineata

Scientific classification
- Domain: Eukaryota
- Kingdom: Animalia
- Phylum: Mollusca
- Class: Gastropoda
- Order: Stylommatophora
- Family: Polygyridae
- Tribe: Triodopisini
- Genus: Webbhelix; K. C. Emberton, 1988

= Webbhelix =

Genus of gastropods

Webbhelix is a genus of North American land snails, terrestrial pulmonate gastropod mollusks in the family Polygyridae. The genus contains several taxa which were previously included under the name Triodopsis multilineata.

== Species ==
Species within the genus Webbhelix include: species:

- Webbhelix chadwicki (Ferris, 1907)
- Webbhelix multilineata (Say, 1821)
