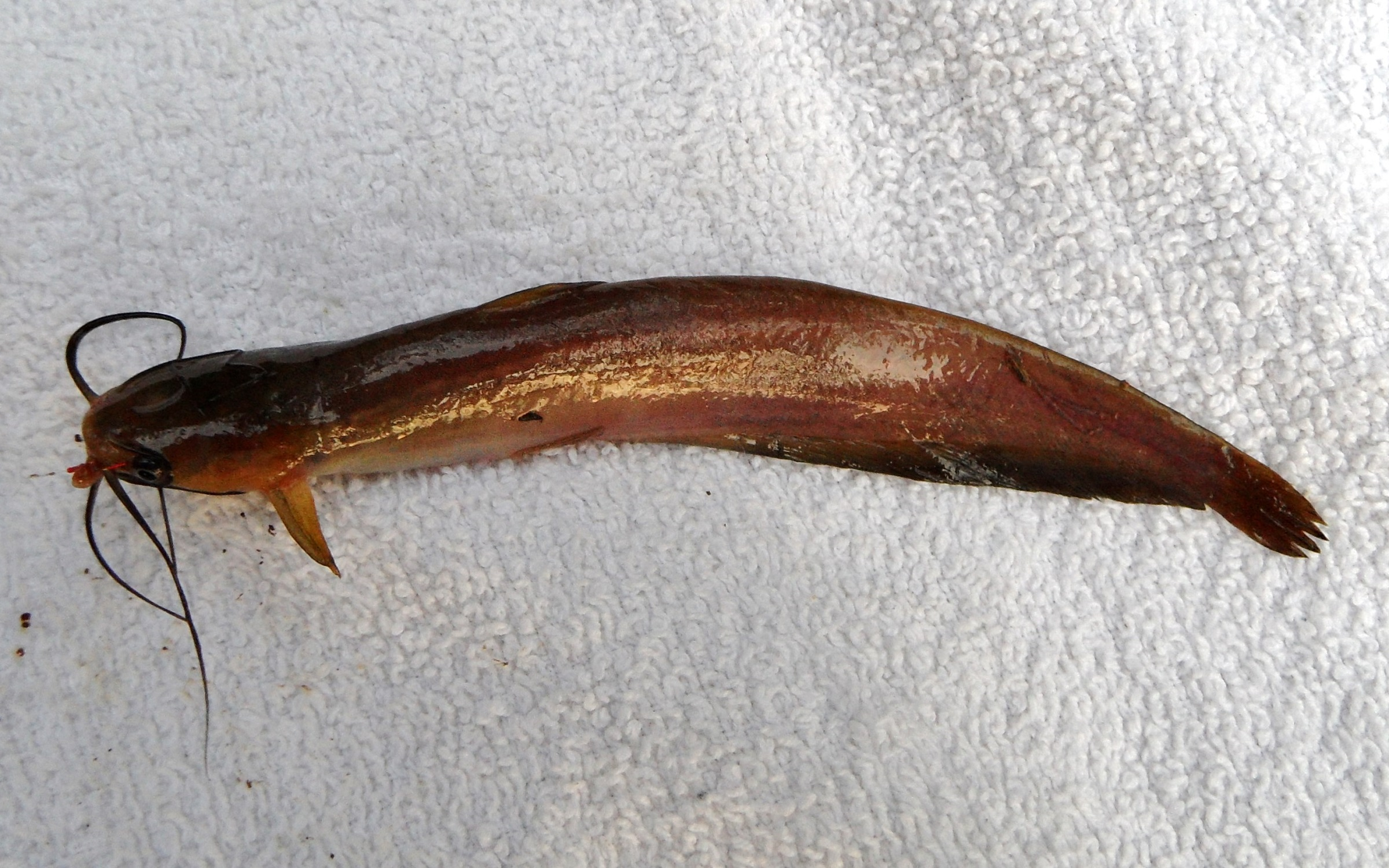

Scientific classification
- Domain: Eukaryota
- Kingdom: Animalia
- Phylum: Chordata
- Class: Actinopterygii
- Order: Siluriformes
- Family: Heteropneustidae
- Genus: Heteropneustes
- Species: H. microps

Binomial name
- Heteropneustes microps (Günther, 1864)

Synonyms
- Saccobranchus microps Günther, 1864

= Heteropneustes microps =

Species of fish

Heteropneustes microps is a species of airsac catfish possibly endemic to Sri Lanka, though records from India have been made. This species grows to a total length of 15.0 cm (5.9 in). This fish is a component of local commercial fisheries, and is found in the aquarium trade.
