= Phreatobius sanguijuela =

Conservation status
- Critically Endangered (IUCN 3.1)

Scientific classification
- Kingdom: Animalia
- Phylum: Chordata
- Class: Actinopterygii
- Order: Siluriformes
- Family: Phreatobiidae
- Genus: Phreatobius
- Species: P. sanguijuela

Binomial name
- Phreatobius sanguijuela L. A. Fernández, Saucedo, Carvajal-Vallejos & S. A. Schaefer, 2007

Species of fish

Phreatobius sanguijuela is a South American species of heptapterid catfish that lives in underground waters.

== Description ==
This small fish reaches a maximum standard length of 4.2 cm (1.7 in). P. sanguijuela differs from P. cisternarum in a number of ways, but the main differences are the absence of eyes (which are present in P. cisternarum).

== Distribution, habitat, and ecology ==
This species was first discovered in a hand-dug well located within the Paragúa River drainage, a tributary of the Guaporé (Iténez) River in Bolivia. Later it was discovered just across the border in several wells near São Francisco do Guaporé in the Brazilian state of Rondônia. This species is threatened by environmental degradation due to pollution, water extraction for drinking and irrigation, mineral extraction, and associated erosion. It is often killed when accidentally caught from wells because of a superficial resemblance to leeches.
