= Lacandon =

Lacandon may refer to:

- the Lacandon people, one of the contemporary Maya peoples
- the Lakandon Ch'ol, a historic Maya people
- the Lacandon language, the language spoken by the contemporary Lacandon people
- the Lacandon Jungle, a Mexican region

== See also ==
- Lacandonia, a genus of plants
- Lacantunia, a genus of catfish
- Lacantún River, in Mexico
- Laocoon (disambiguation)
