= Phreatobius dracunculus =

Conservation status
- Data Deficient (IUCN 3.1)

Scientific classification
- Kingdom: Animalia
- Phylum: Chordata
- Class: Actinopterygii
- Order: Siluriformes
- Family: Phreatobiidae
- Genus: Phreatobius
- Species: P. dracunculus

Binomial name
- Phreatobius dracunculus Shibatta, Muriel-Cunha & de Pinna, 2007

Species of fish

Phreatobius dracunculus is a species of catfish in the genus Phreatobius.

Phreatobius dracunculus was discovered from an artificial well in the village of Rio Pardo, located in the drainage area of the Rio Branco (Rio Madeira system, Amazon basin).

This small fish reaches a maximum length of 3.8 centimetres (1.5 in) SL. P. dracunculus differs from P. cisternarum in a number of ways, but the main differences are the absence of eyes (which are present in P. cisternarum) and the lack of dark pigmentation in the skin (while in P. cisternarum some faint dark pigment is always present). These fish are light pink.
