= Rita bakalu =

Conservation status
- Data Deficient (IUCN 3.1)

Scientific classification
- Kingdom: Animalia
- Phylum: Chordata
- Class: Actinopterygii
- Order: Siluriformes
- Family: Ritidae
- Genus: Rita
- Species: R. bakalu

Binomial name
- Rita bakalu (Lal et al., 2017)

Species of ray-finned fish

Rita bakalu is a species of bagrid catfish endemic to India and belongs to the genus, Rita. R. bakalu was reported from the Godavari river in peninsular India. Though R. bakalu looks like R. kuturnee, it differs in the structure of its teeth patches on its upper jaw and palate, the origin of its anal fin, its eye diameter, its longer mandibular barbels, and the number of vertebrae.
