= Chaca =

Chaca may refer to:

== Animals ==
- The catfish genus Chaca

== Places ==
=== Spain ===
- An alternative spelling of the town Jaca, Spain

== Literature ==
- A character in The Emperor's New School

== People ==
- Kristian Menchaca, an American soldier who was killed in the Iraq War
