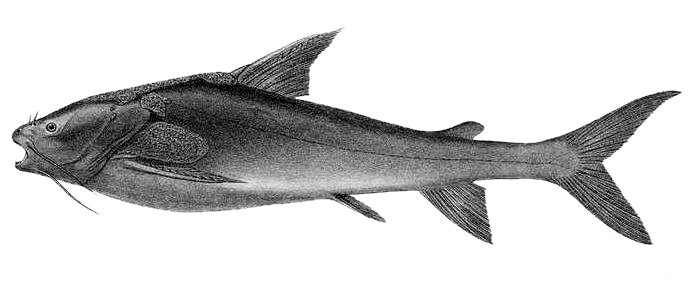

Conservation status
- Least Concern (IUCN 3.1)

Scientific classification
- Kingdom: Animalia
- Phylum: Chordata
- Class: Actinopterygii
- Order: Siluriformes
- Family: Ritidae
- Genus: Rita
- Species: R. sacerdotum

Binomial name
- Rita sacerdotum J. Anderson, 1879

= Rita sacerdotum =

Species of fish

Rita sacerdotum, the Salween rita, is a species of bagrid catfish that occurs in Myanmar and Thailand where it is found in large rivers (such as the Salween River). It is the giant of its genus, reaching a length of 200 cm (79 in).
