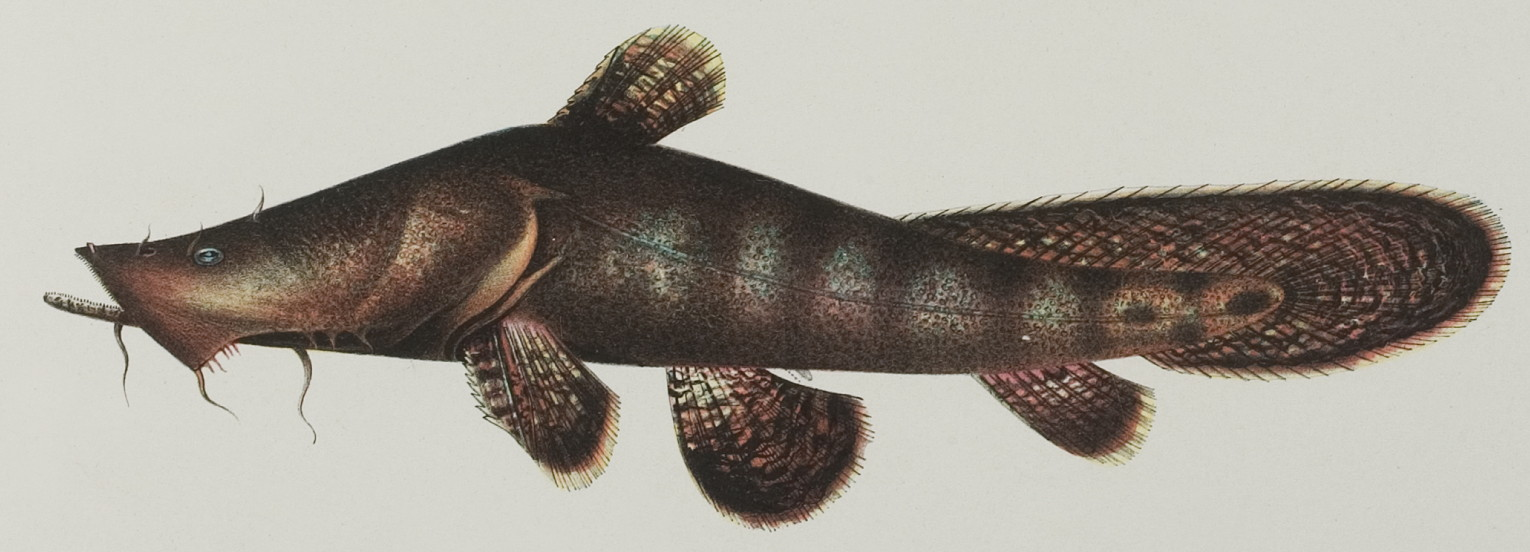

Conservation status
- Near Threatened (IUCN 3.1)

Scientific classification
- Kingdom: Animalia
- Phylum: Chordata
- Class: Actinopterygii
- Order: Siluriformes
- Family: Chacidae
- Genus: Chaca
- Species: C. bankanensis

Binomial name
- Chaca bankanensis Bleeker, 1852

= Chaca bankanensis =

Species of fish

Chaca bankanensis is a species of angler catfish found in the Sundaland region, where it occurs in Brunei, Indonesia, Malaysia, and Thailand. It is found in peat swamps and streams. This species grows to a length of 20 cm (7.9 in) TL. It is found in the aquarium trade.
