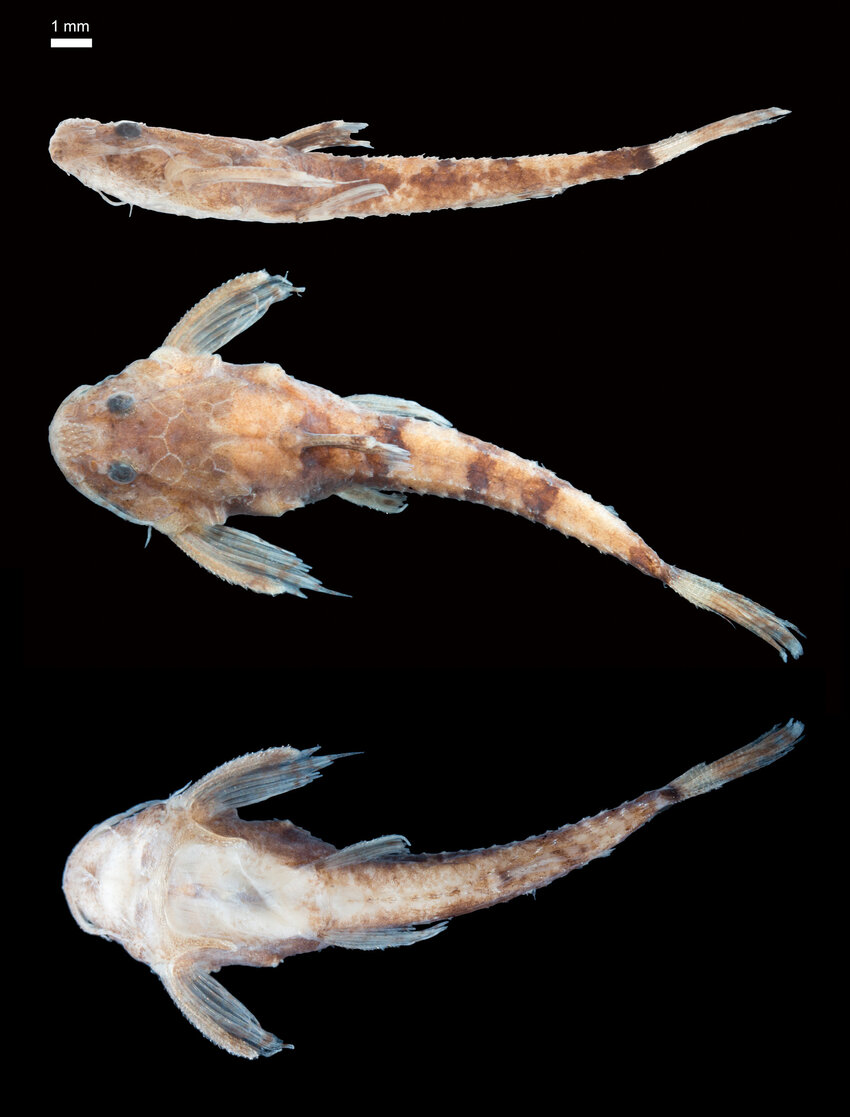

Conservation status
- Least Concern (IUCN 3.1)

Scientific classification
- Kingdom: Animalia
- Phylum: Chordata
- Class: Actinopterygii
- Order: Siluriformes
- Family: Scoloplacidae
- Genus: Scoloplax
- Species: S. dicra

Binomial name
- Scoloplax dicra Bailey & Baskin, 1976

= Scoloplax dicra =

Species of catfish

Scoloplax dicra is a species of freshwater ray-finned fish belonging to the family Scoloplacidae, the dwarf spiny catfishes. This catfish is found throughout the river basins of South America.

== Geographic range and habitat ==
Scoloplax dicra has the widest distribution in the family Scoloplacidae. Its range encompasses the Amazon and Paraguay River basins and several of their tributaries, particularly the Rio Maronon/Ucayali drainage of Peru, the Rio Mamore or Guaporé of Brazil, and the lower basin of the Rio Negro in its northernmost distribution. It is also present in the upper Rio Madeira and tributaries of the Rio Solimões, Rio Purus and Rio Juruá basins.

Scoloplax dicra live in stagnant oxbow lagoons that are heavily shaded by lowland forests. Species of Scoloplax inhabit waters with slow currents, blackwater, muddy, silty, or sandy bottoms, and which have a presence of riparian and submerged vegetation. Their preferred habitat is acidic waters with settled organic detritus on the bottom.

== Physical description ==
Species in the genus Scoloplax are among the armored catfish groups, with well-developed integumentary teeth on the fins, head, and usually on the separate bony plates of the body.

The standard length of Scoloplax dicra ranges from 9 to 20 millimetres (0.35 to 0.79 in).

Scoloplax dicra has a subterminal (bottom-facing) mouth typical of bottom-feeding fish, with bifid teeth in a single row in both upper and lower jaws. Gills extend from the lower pectoral base to the upper corner of the operculum with short gill rakers. Four branchiostegal rays (flattened dermal bones) support the branchiostegal membrane.

A pair of lateral bony spheres with sharp lateral projections encapsulates its swim bladder vesicles. The dorsal and pectoral spines have locking mechanisms.

The anal fin is short and rounded, while the pelvic fin is relatively long with three to four soft rays. The adipose fin is absent. The maxillary barbel extends to just beyond the insertion of the pectoral fin, with the barbel forks behind the angle of the mouth—no nasal barbel is present. Scoloplax dicra also has a characteristic pair of bony plates with 3 odontodes, located between the pelvic-fin base and anus, which has not been recorded in any other Scoloplax species. It also has 27 total vertebrae, a condition shared with outgroup loricariids.

== Life cycle ==
The reproductive biology of Scoloplacids is poorly characterized by current studies. Scoloplacidae has exhibited marked sexual dimorphism, and Scoloplax dicra might be an inseminating species, based on the histological identification of spermatozoa within the ovaries. It is suggested that these fish reproduce early during the rainy season from November on, and most of the adult population dies afterwards.

Not much is known about the longevity of this species. It is likely that Scoloplax dicra has an annual life cycle. There is a marked lack of living adults after the rainy season when they have reproduced.

== Economic importance ==
The small size and secretive habits of Scoloplacidae preclude any aquaculture use.

== Conservation status ==
Although not many specimens have been collected, its conservation is of little concern due to its wide distribution. Because the region it inhabits is a potential hotspot for freshwater fishes, the narrow floodplain in the region could impact Scoloplacidae populations. Zoning and restrictions have been recommended to minimize the impact on these species within their distribution, which may be frustrated by the fact that it is present within multiple countries.
