= Heteropneustes kemratensis =

Conservation status
- Least Concern (IUCN 3.1)

Scientific classification
- Kingdom: Animalia
- Phylum: Chordata
- Class: Actinopterygii
- Order: Siluriformes
- Family: Heteropneustidae
- Genus: Heteropneustes
- Species: H. kemratensis

Binomial name
- Heteropneustes kemratensis (Fowler, 1937)

Synonyms
- Clarisilurus kemratensis Fowler, 1937

Species of fish

Heteropneustes kemratensis, the airsac catfish, is a species of catfish native to Myanmar, Laos and Thailand. This species grows to a standard length of 27.0 cm (10.6 in).

Ubon Ratchathani province's Khemarat in northeastern Thailand is a type locality.

The catfish is commercially farmed and has been registered as a GI (geographical indication) product of Surat Thani province in southern Thailand with cultivation areas covering up to eight districts.
