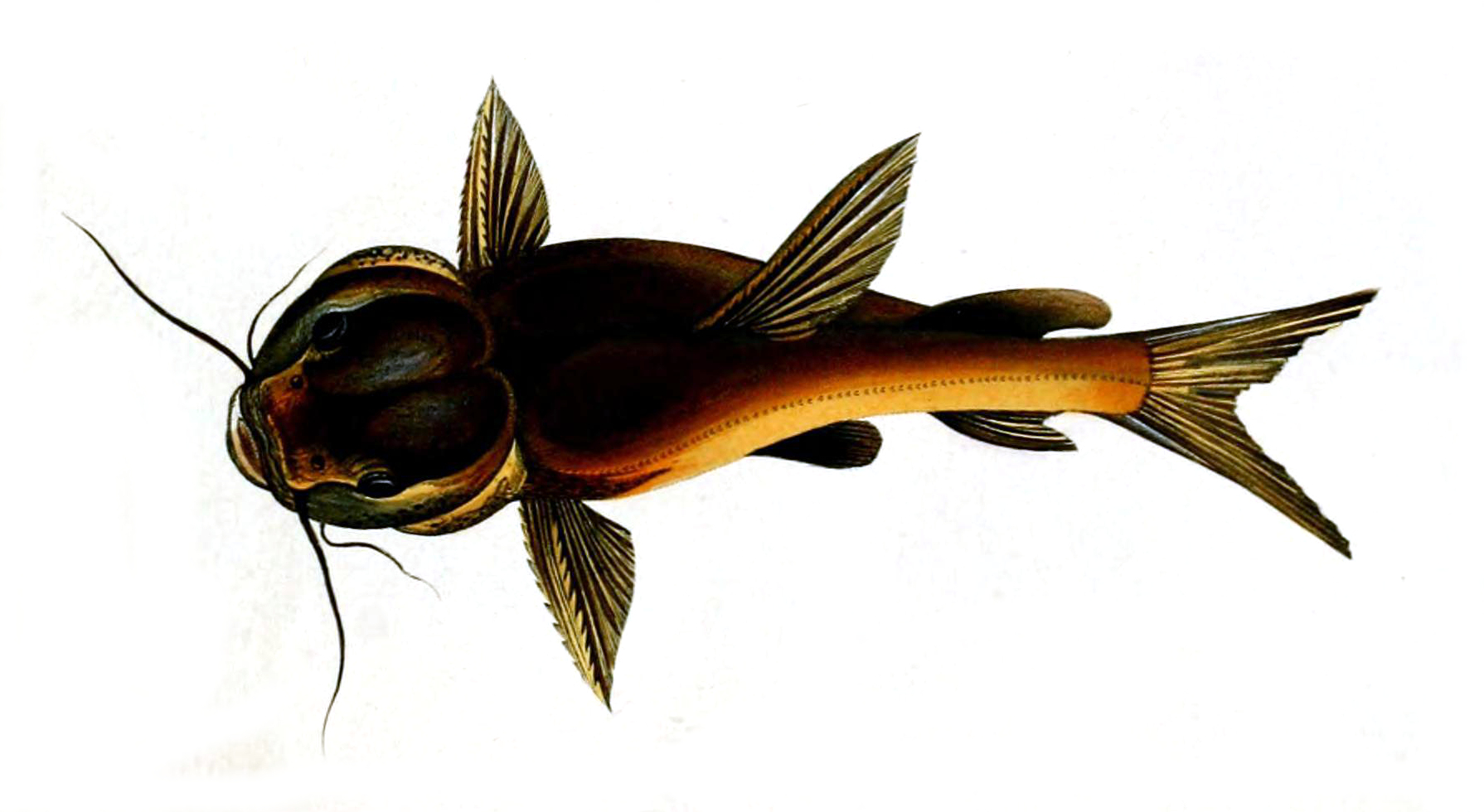

Conservation status
- Least Concern (IUCN 3.1)

Scientific classification
- Kingdom: Animalia
- Phylum: Chordata
- Class: Actinopterygii
- Order: Siluriformes
- Family: Ritidae
- Genus: Rita
- Species: R. gogra

Binomial name
- Rita gogra (Sykes, 1839)

Synonyms
- Phractocephalus gogra Sykes, 1839; Arius pavimentatus Valenciennes, 1840; Rita pavimentata (Valenciennes, 1840); Rita pavimentatus (Valenciennes, 1840); Gogrius sykesii Day, 1867

= Rita gogra =

Species of fish

Rita gogra is a species of bagrid catfish endemic to India where it is found in the rivers of the Deccan Plateau up to the Krishna River system. It is an inhabitant of large rivers. It grows to a total length of 26 cm and is commercially fished for human consumption.
