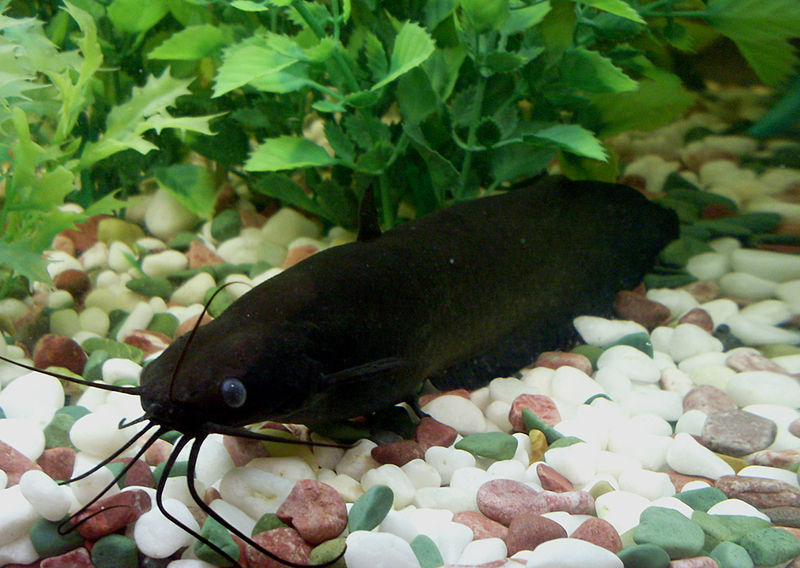

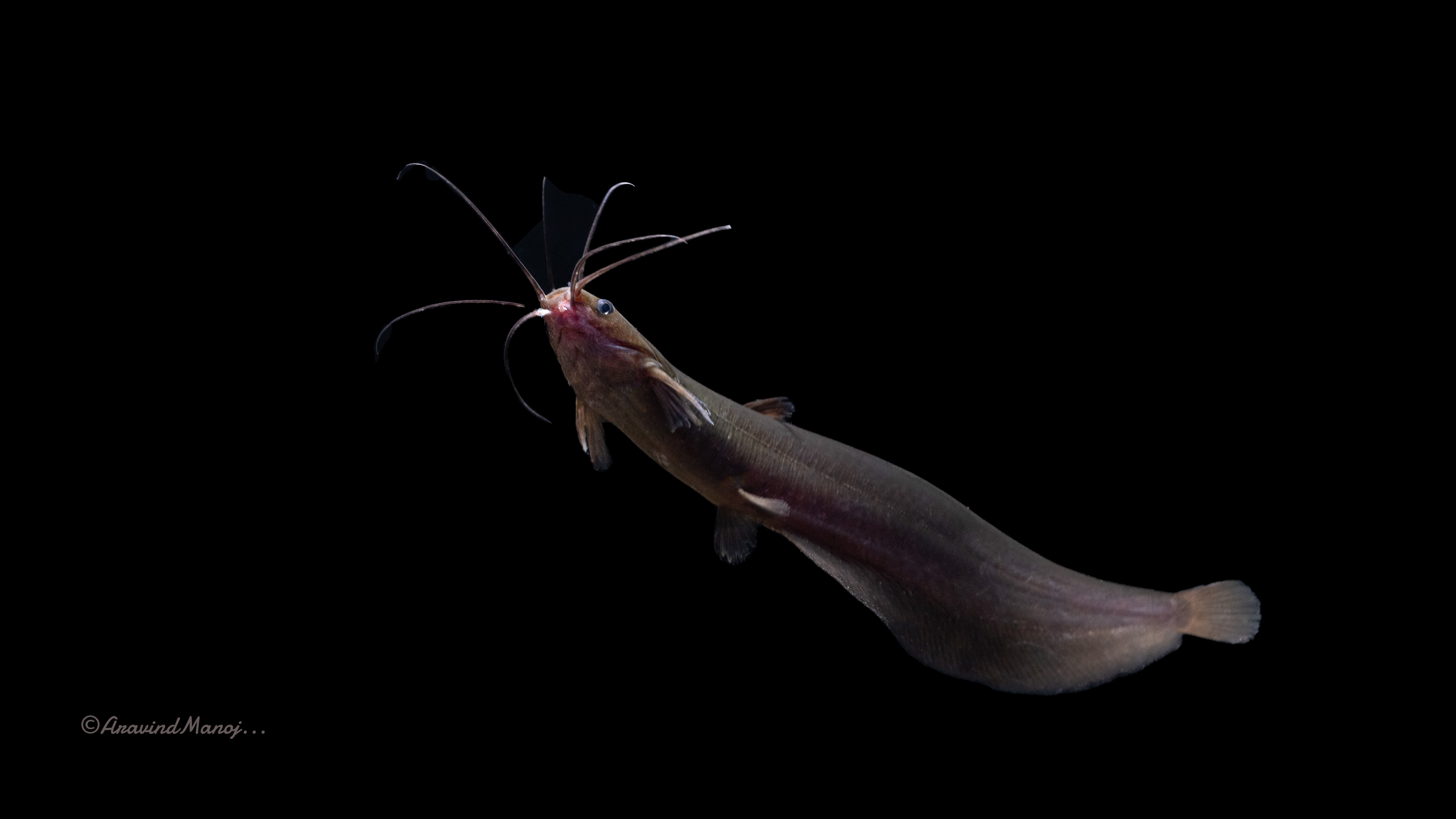

Conservation status
- Least Concern (IUCN 3.1)

Scientific classification
- Kingdom: Animalia
- Phylum: Chordata
- Class: Actinopterygii
- Order: Siluriformes
- Family: Clariidae
- Genus: Heteropneustes
- Species: H. fossilis

Binomial name
- Heteropneustes fossilis (Bloch, 1794)

Synonyms
- List: Silurus fossilis Bloch, 1794; Saccobranchus fossilis (Bloch, 1794); Silurus singio Hamilton, 1822; Saccobranchus singio (Hamilton, 1822); Silurus laticeps Swainson, 1838; Silurus biserratus Swainson, 1839; Saccobranchus microcephalus Günther, 1864

= Heteropneustes fossilis =

Species of fish

Heteropneustes fossilis, also known as Asian stinging catfish or fossil cat, is a species of airsac catfish found in India, Bangladesh, Pakistan, Nepal, Sri Lanka, Thailand, Myanmar, and Bhutan. It has also been introduced to the Tigris River Basin in western Iran.

== Description ==
H. fossilis is found mainly in ponds, ditches, swamps, and marshes, but sometimes occurs in muddy rivers. It can tolerate slightly brackish water. It is omnivorous. This species breeds in confined waters during the monsoon, but can breed in ponds, derelict ponds, and ditches when sufficient rainwater accumulates. It is in great demand due to its alleged medicinal value.

The stinging catfish is able to deliver a painful sting to humans. Poison from a gland on its pectoral fin spine has been known to be extremely painful.

This species grows to a total length of 30 cm (12 in), and is an important component of local commercial fisheries. It is also farmed and found in the aquarium trade.
