= Rita grandiscutata =

Rita grandiscutata Temporal range: Early Pliocene

Scientific classification
- Domain: Eukaryota
- Kingdom: Animalia
- Phylum: Chordata
- Class: Actinopterygii
- Order: Siluriformes
- Family: Ritidae
- Genus: Rita
- Species: †R. grandiscutata

Binomial name
- †Rita grandiscutata Lydekker, 1886

Synonyms
- †Chrysichthys theobaldi Lydekker, 1886

Extinct species of fish

Rita grandiscutata is an extinct species of catfish of the family Bagridae. It is known from a very large partial dorsal spine recovered from the early Pliocene-aged Siwalik Formation of Punjab, India. It was a member of Rita, a genus of catfishes that is still dominant in South Asia.
