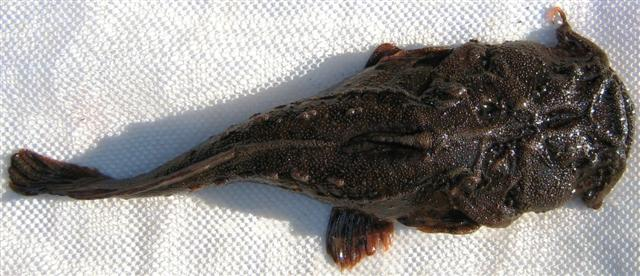

Conservation status
- Least Concern (IUCN 3.1)

Scientific classification
- Kingdom: Animalia
- Phylum: Chordata
- Class: Actinopterygii
- Order: Siluriformes
- Family: Chacidae
- Genus: Chaca
- Species: C. chaca

Binomial name
- Chaca chaca (F. Hamilton, 1822)

Synonyms
- Platystacus chaca F. Hamilton, 1822; Chaca lophioides Cuvier & Valenciennes, 1832; Chaca buchanani Günther, 1864

= Chaca chaca =

Species of fish

Chaca chaca is a species of angler catfish found in the Ganges-Brahmaputra River system of India and the Ayeyarwady River of Myanmar, where it is found in rivers, canals and ponds of grassland, scrubland, deciduous forest and rainforest habitats. It is a bottom-dwelling species that inhabits sandy, muddy, or soft substrates where it buries itself for both protection and ambush predation. In Assam, it is locally known as kurkuri. Chaca chaca is occasionally seen in the aquarium trade as an ornamental species due to its unusual appearance and behavior.

== Description ==
Chaca chaca has a highly cryptic appearance with a flattened, broad head and body. The fish is well-camouflaged with mottled coloring that helps it blend into muddy or sandy substrates. The previously documented maximum length was 20.0 centimetres (7.9 in), but a specimen of 23.8 centimetres (9.4 in) total length was collected in 2024, representing a new maximum size record for the species.

== Anatomy and adaptations ==
=== Feeding adaptations ===
Chaca chaca is an ambush predator with several specialized adaptations for its feeding ecology. Unlike most fish species, C. chaca completely lacks gill rakers on the pharyngeal side of the gill arches. This absence is considered an adaptation that facilitates the smooth swallowing of prey items without hindrance, particularly important given the species' ability to consume prey nearly as large as itself. The fish uses a luring and angling behavior to attract prey, and when ready to strike, rapidly opens its large mouth to create a vacuum that pulls water and prey into its capacious oral cavity. The oral and pharyngeal regions contain numerous taste buds, many located at the summit of epithelial protuberances, which enhance gustatory efficiency for food selection before swallowing.

=== Respiratory adaptations ===
The gills show several features associated with the species' bottom-dwelling lifestyle and tolerance of low-oxygen conditions. The gill septa between filaments are greatly reduced, which allows the gill filaments to splay out and increases the surface area available for gas exchange. The gill epithelium has a corrugated surface that provides mechanical protection and increases the available surface area for respiration. There are extensive secondary lamellae present and relatively few mucous goblet cells, adaptations that help to maximize gas exchange efficiency.

=== Skin and sensory adaptations ===
The epidermis of C. chaca exhibits specialized structures adapted to its burrowing and bottom-dwelling habits. The skin surface contains both mucogenic (mucus-secreting) regions and keratinized structures distributed at irregular intervals. The keratinized structures appear as rounded elevated plaques or cone-shaped formations and are thought to provide protection against abrasion during burrowing. Superficial keratinized cells regularly exfoliate from the surface, a process that may help remove sediment deposits, debris, and pathogens.

The surface of epithelial cells is covered with microrridges that help trap and distribute mucus across the skin surface. The epidermis also contains numerous taste buds and superficial neuromasts (mechanosensory organs). The presence of elongated neuromasts and abundant taste buds, often located on raised epithelial projections, is considered an adaptation for detecting and locating prey in the species' nocturnal, bottom-dwelling lifestyle.
