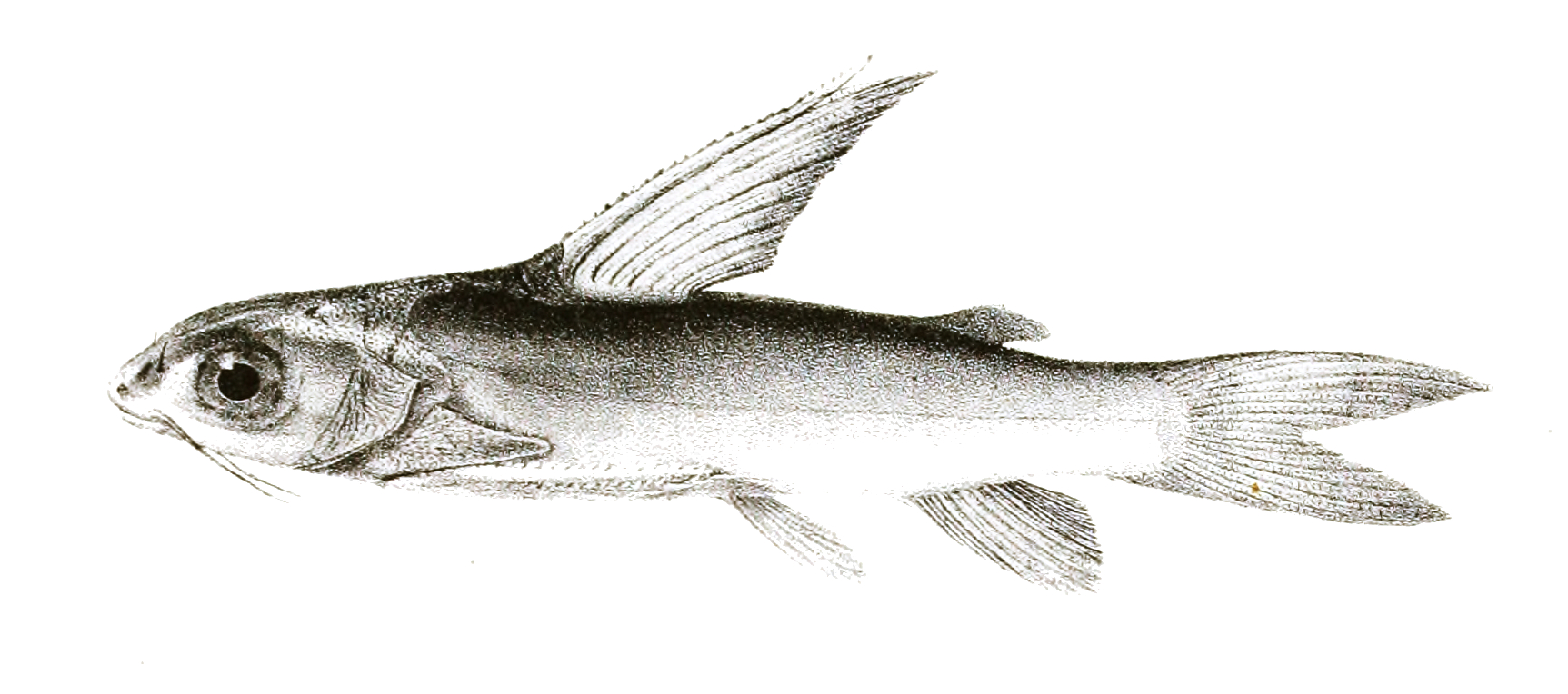

Conservation status
- Least Concern (IUCN 3.1)

Scientific classification
- Kingdom: Animalia
- Phylum: Chordata
- Class: Actinopterygii
- Order: Siluriformes
- Family: Ritidae
- Genus: Rita
- Species: R. chrysea

Binomial name
- Rita chrysea F. Day, 1877

= Rita chrysea =

Species of fish

Rita chrysea, or the Mahanadi rita, is a species of bagrid catfish endemic to India where it inhabits the Mahanadi River system in Orissa and Madhya Pradesh. It is found in rivers and large streams. Spawning occurs during the monsoon months. It grows to a length of 19.5 cm (7.7 in) and is commercially fished for human consumption.
