= Rita macracanthus =

Scientific classification
- Kingdom: Animalia
- Phylum: Chordata
- Class: Actinopterygii
- Order: Siluriformes
- Family: Ritidae
- Genus: Rita
- Species: R. macracanthus

Binomial name
- Rita macracanthus H. H. Ng, 2004

Species of fish

Rita macracanthus is a species of bagrid catfish found in the Indus River drainage. It has been recorded from Afghanistan, India and Pakistan. It grows to a length of 26.3 cm.

R. macracanthus feeds on invertebrates and small fishes. Its breeding season lasts from June to the end of July, during which the fish migrates to colder waters in shoals.
