= Rita rita =

Conservation status
- Least Concern (IUCN 3.1)

Scientific classification
- Kingdom: Animalia
- Phylum: Chordata
- Class: Actinopterygii
- Order: Siluriformes
- Family: Ritidae
- Genus: Rita
- Species: R. rita

Binomial name
- Rita rita (F. Hamilton, 1822)

Synonyms
- Pimelodus rita Hamilton, 1822; Arius ritoides Valenciennes, 1840; Rita ritoides (Valenciennes, 1840); Rita buchanani Bleeker, 1853; Arius cruciger Owen, 1853; Rita crucigera (Owen, 1853)

Species of fish

Rita rita (Common names: rita in English, রিঠা in Bengali) is a species of bagrid catfish that is found across southern Asia. It has been recorded in Afghanistan, Bangladesh, India, Myanmar, Nepal and Pakistan. It is one of the giants of its genus, growing a length of 150 cm. It is commercially fished for human consumption.

R. rita is a sluggish, bottom-dwelling catfish. It inhabits rivers and estuaries, preferring muddy to clear water. It also prefers backwater of quiet eddies.

R. rita is an omnivorous catfish; the bulk of its diet consists of mollusks. In addition, it feeds on small fishes, crustaceans, insects, as well as on decaying organic matter.
