= Chaca burmensis =

Conservation status
- Data Deficient (IUCN 3.1)

Scientific classification
- Kingdom: Animalia
- Phylum: Chordata
- Class: Actinopterygii
- Order: Siluriformes
- Family: Chacidae
- Genus: Chaca
- Species: C. burmensis

Binomial name
- Chaca burmensis B. A. Brown & Ferraris, 1988

Species of fish

Chaca burmensis is a species of angler catfish endemic to Myanmar, where it is found in the Sittang River and possibly the Ayeyarwady drainage. This species grows to a length of 20 cm (7.9 in) TL.
