= Chiapas catfish =

Conservation status
- Vulnerable (IUCN 3.1)

Scientific classification
- Kingdom: Animalia
- Phylum: Chordata
- Class: Actinopterygii
- Order: Siluriformes
- Family: Lacantuniidae; Rodiles-Hernández, Hendrickson & Lundberg, 2005
- Genus: Lacantunia; Rodiles-Hernández, Hendrickson & Lundberg, 2005
- Species: L. enigmatica

Binomial name
- Lacantunia enigmatica Rodiles-Hernández, Hendrickson & Lundberg, 2005

Species of fish

The Chiapas catfish (Lacantunia enigmatica) is an unusual species of catfish (order Siluriformes) from the Usumacinta River basin in the Mexican state of Chiapas and in Guatemala. It was scientifically described in 2005 and placed in its own family Lacantuniidae. While discovery of an undescribed species of catfish is not uncommon, discovery of a new family of any vertebrate group is a rare event. The Chiapas catfish mainly feeds on crabs, prawns, small fish, and large, tough plant seeds. This catfish is commonly fished in its natural habitat, where it is known as madre de juil, which means "mother of Rhamdia" (a common fish in the area).

== Discovery ==
It first came to the attention of scientists in 1996, when Rócio Rodiles-Hernández, a Mexican ichthyologist conducting a biotic survey on the river, collected the first specimens from the Chiapas-Guatemala border. Unable to identify the species, Rodiles involved two American catfish specialists, Dean A. Hendrickson of the University of Texas at Austin and John G. Lundberg of the Academy of Natural Sciences of Philadelphia. A detailed comparative morphological study employing high-resolution, three-dimensional CT-scan imagery of the fish's anatomy revealed a number of distinctive characteristics unique to this species and the absence of characters needed to place this fish in any existing catfish family. In a 2005 publication, these three ichthyologists, with Julian M. Humphries of the University of Texas, described this fish as a new species, genus and family of catfish.

== Taxonomy ==
This fish is not related to any of the families found in its range (Ariidae, Ictaluridae, or Heptapteridae). It is most similar to Ictaluridae, but lacks some important characteristics to classify this fish into this family or the other two families. Initial study has placed this fish above Diplomystidae, Cetopsidae, and Hypsidoridae, but further classification is unknown. This family probably represents a basal group in which intermediates have disappeared.

With recent molecular evidence, Lacantunia has been shown to be the sister group to Claroteidae, an African catfish family. It probably diverged from the claroteids in the Late Cretaceous between 75 and 90 million years ago.

== Distribution and habitat ==
The generic name of the fish reflects its distribution in the Lacantún River drainage, flowing through the Montes Azules and Selva Lacandona Biosphere Reserves in Chiapas, Mexico into the Usumacinta River. After its initial discovery in the Lacantún, it was found to also inhabit other parts of the Usumacinta River basin, extending its range into northwestern Guatemala. With the description of the new family, four catfish families are now found in this region.

These fish inhabit deep river channels and pools, often but not always with rocks and strong eddy currents. Few specimens were taken in stream mouths.

== Physical characteristics ==
Key variations that differentiate this genus from all other families are the shape of the animal's skull, jaw muscles, and gas bladder — which fish use to rise and sink in water. The gas bladder has paired diverticulae, while other catfish families either have no diverticulae or singular diverticulae. Some external characteristics that may help distinguish this fish include nostrils set far apart, the presences of nasal barbels, maxillary barbels placed above the lip distantly from the corner of the mouth, and a rounded caudal fin. This fish has four pairs of barbels. The maximum length of this species reaches 42.7 centimetres (16.8 in) SL. It is depressed (flattened) near the head and compressed (thin) near the tail. The head is blunt and rounded, and the mouth is usually not subterminal (down-turned). The adipose fin is large and thick. This fish has dorsal and pectoral fin spines.
