= Rita (fish) =

Rita Temporal range: 5.3–0 Ma Lower Pliocene to Recent

Scientific classification
- Kingdom: Animalia
- Phylum: Chordata
- Class: Actinopterygii
- Division: Teleostei
- Order: Siluriformes
- Superfamily: Bagroidea
- Family: Ritidae; Bleeker, 1858
- Genus: Rita; Bleeker, 1853

Type species
- Pimelodus rita Hamilton, 1822

Genus of fishes

Rita (from the Bengali name of Rita rita), is a genus of catfish found in South Asia. It is the only member of the family Ritidae. These species have a single pair of mandibular barbels, an elongated Weberian apparatus firmly sutured to the basioccipital and the sensory canal on the posttemporal enclosed with bone.

== Species ==
There are currently 7 recognized species in this genus:

- Rita bakalu K. K. Lal, Dwivedi & R. K. Singh, 2016
- Rita chrysea F. Day, 1877
- Rita gogra (Sykes, 1839)
- Rita kuturnee (Sykes, 1839)
- Rita macracanthus H. H. Ng, 2004
- Rita rita (F. Hamilton, 1822)
- Rita sacerdotum J. Anderson, 1879

In addition, the fossil species Rita grandiscutata is known from the Early Pliocene-aged sediments in the Siwalik Hills of Punjab.
