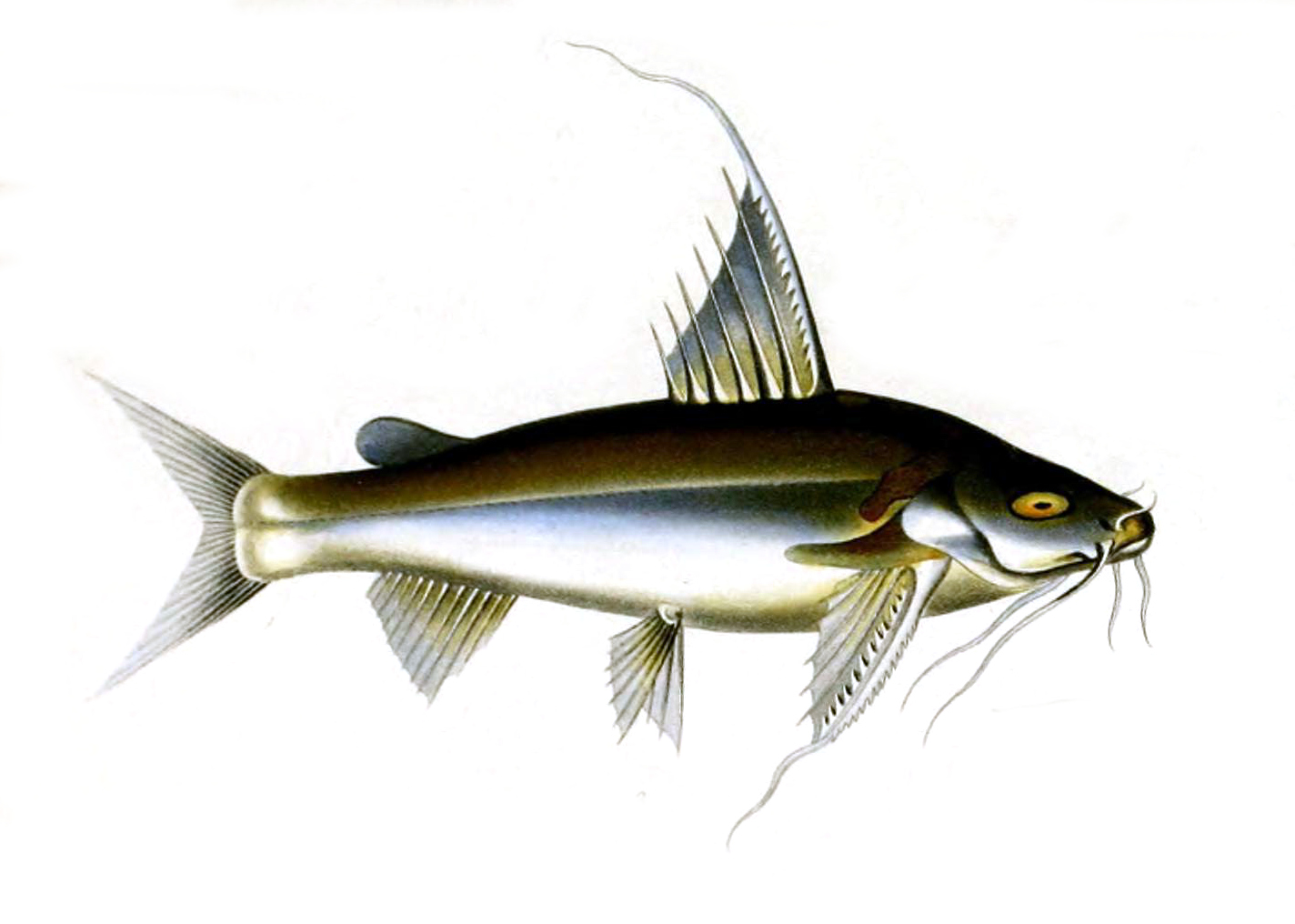

Conservation status
- Least Concern (IUCN 3.1)

Scientific classification
- Kingdom: Animalia
- Phylum: Chordata
- Class: Actinopterygii
- Order: Siluriformes
- Family: Ritidae
- Genus: Rita
- Species: R. kuturnee

Binomial name
- Rita kuturnee (Sykes, 1839)

Synonyms
- Phractocephalus kuturnee Sykes, 1839; Arius hastatus Valenciennes, 1840; Rita hastata (Valenciennes, 1840); Arius pumilus Valenciennes, 1840

= Rita kuturnee =

Species of fish

Rita kuturnee is a species of bagrid catfish endemic to India where it occurs in the rivers of the Deccan Plateau up to the Krishna River system. It is an inhabitant of large rivers. It grows to a total length of 30 cm and is commercially fished for human consumption.
