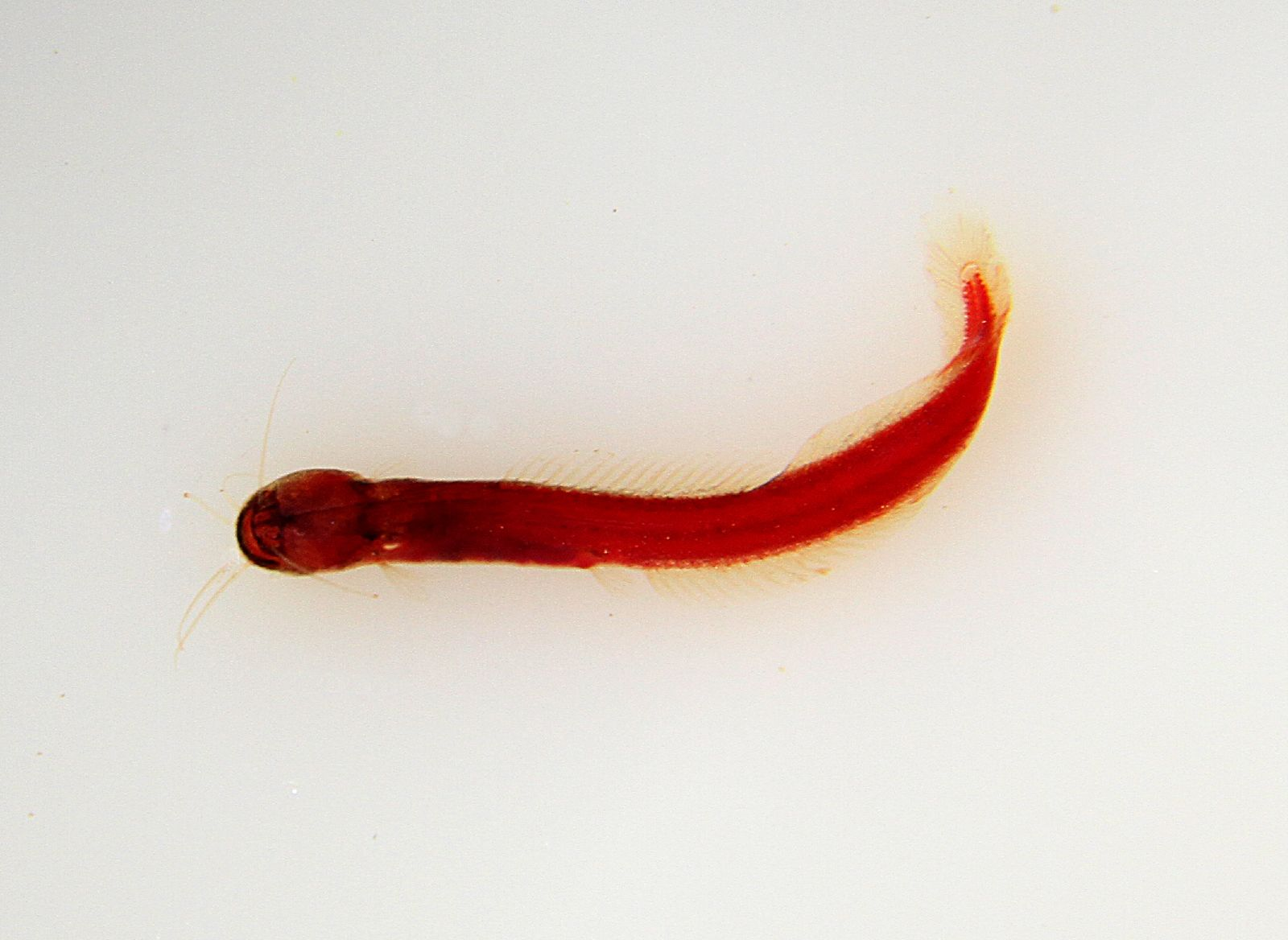
- Phreatobius n sp

Scientific classification
- Kingdom: Animalia
- Phylum: Chordata
- Class: Actinopterygii
- Order: Siluriformes
- Suborder: Siluroidei
- Family: Phreatobiidae; Reichel, 1927
- Genus: Phreatobius; Goeldi, 1905

Type species
- Phreatobius cisternarum Goeldi, 1905

= Phreatobius =

Genus of fishes

Phreatobius, also known as cistern catfishes, is a genus of very small catfishes (order Siluriformes) from tropical South America.

== Taxonomy ==
For quite some time Phreatobius cisternarum was the only species in the genus. However, two new species were described relatively recently in 2007, Phreatobius dracunculus and Phreatobius sanguijuela.

Phreatobius has been classified with a number of different families: Clariidae, Plotosidae, Trichomycteridae, Cetopsidae, and Pimelodidae. Most recently, it has been classified in Heptapteridae. Its phylogenetic position remains uncertain. The family placement of the genus has remained problematic and thus it is not classified in any of the existing families, though Fishbase treats it as a member of Heptapteridae.

An undescribed species of Phreatobius lives in waterlogged leaf litter near (not in) streams. Phreatobius walkeri, a nomen nudum, is provided by the Guinness Book of World Records, to describe this fish that stays on land for extended periods of time. Two additional quite distinctive species of Phreatobius, as yet undescribed, are known from the Río Negro basin of Brazil.

== Species ==
There are currently three recognized species in this genus:

- Phreatobius cisternarum Goeldi, 1905
- Phreatobius dracunculus Shibatta, Muriel-Cunha & de Pinna, 2007
- Phreatobius sanguijuela L. A. Fernández, Saucedo, Carvajal-Vallejos & S. A. Schaefer, 2007

== Distribution and habitat ==
The three scientifically described Phreatobius species all live underground and are known only from artificial wells penetrating near-surface aquifers of the Amazon basin. The genus has one of the widest distribution of any hypogean fish genus, with P. sanguijuela from the upper Amazon, some 2000 km from reported locations of P. cisternarum near the Amazon River mouth, and P. dracunculus also approximately 1900 km from the Rio Branco drainage area.

== Description ==
This genus can be recognized by the combination of characteristics, such as their dorsal and anal fins being continuous with a rounded caudal fin, unbranched anal fin rays, a projecting lower jaw, bright red coloration, a lack of the dorsal fin spine locking mechanism, the first pectoral fin ray being soft instead of spinous. Most of these traits are rare or unusual among vast groups of catfish.

All three species look extremely similar. However, in P. cisternarum the eyes are tiny, while P. dracunculus and P. sanguijuela lack eyes altogether. The two eyeless species can be differentiated by fin-ray and vertebrae counts. It is also described that P. dracunculus is lighter in color, while P. cisternarum and P. sanguijuela are described as bright red.
