= Catfish Dispute =

2000s US–Vietnam trade war

The Catfish Dispute started in 2001 as a trade war between Vietnam and the United States' catfish producers. It mainly concerns the import volume of catfish from Vietnam, which results in lower profits for U.S. catfish producers. In dealing with major losses in profit, the Catfish Farmers of America (CFA) presented a series of lawsuits to the United States Department of Commerce against frozen catfish from Vietnam.

First, the CFA filed for a food labeling claim which forced Vietnamese imported catfish to be labeled "Made in Vietnam". Next, the CFA accused the Vietnamese producers of dumping their products into the U.S. market. Most recently, a catfish quality investigation in program was implemented to verify the quality of catfish by Vietnamese producers. These claims from the CFA propose a trade barrier of catfish between Vietnam and the United States. The unresolved catfish disputes affect not only the producers but the consumers in both countries.

== Entry to U.S. market ==
After years of conflicts, the relationship between the U.S. and Vietnam was eventually brightened up when the embargo by the U.S. to Vietnam was lifted in 1995. Following this event, in December 2001, Vietnam and the U.S. signed a bilateral trade agreement (BTA) that resumed and formalized all trading status. Since the BTA became effective, Vietnam increasingly exports up to nearly $30.5 billion worth of their products including shoes, textiles, agricultural goods and other commodities to the U.S. In return, the U.S. exports approximately $5.5 billion in goods to Vietnam. Catfish was among the major exports of Vietnam to the U.S In 2014, catfish producers in Vietnam bred over 1.1 million tonnes and exported around 500 tonnes of catfish every month to the U.S. These figures represents 2 percent of fish consumed by American consumers.

== Trade war initiation ==
In the U.S., catfish is generally raised in Mississippi, Arkansas, and Louisiana in ponds. With the increasing number of catfish imported from Vietnam, U.S. domestic producers began to worry about their profit margins. In 2002, Vietnamese catfish captured around 20 percent of American frozen fish market. In 2012, this figure went up to 60 percent. American catfish producers decided to take proper measurement eventually. The Association of Catfish Farmers of America represented these American domestic producers to file lawsuits against the mass imports of Vietnamese catfish starting in 2001.

=== Food labeling claims ===
In 2001, the CFA decided to propose a food label policy. In particular, the CFA claimed that catfish from Vietnam was poor quality and biologically not catfish. The U.S. Senate favored this claim and passed a law implemented by the Food and Drug Administration (FDA) to require all Vietnamese catfish to be labeled either "Tra" or "Basa". In the following, a label "Made in Vietnam" was also required for any catfish imported from Vietnam. This action aimed to provide customers with more accurate and verifiable choice between foreign and domestically grown catfish. In addition, the CFA ran an ad that encouraged American consumers not to trust foreign catfish because of their breeding origin.

The controversial action of food labeling claims posed a question whether this act aimed to protect consumers or to form a protectionism barrier against Vietnamese catfish. Food-labeling practices are considered a method of protectionism, it is important to have verifiable evidence for the claim. However, the FDA's claims that Vietnamese catfish were unsanitary without sufficient evidence or investigation could be misleading to consumers, and would put Vietnamese producers in a potentially unequal trade position.

=== Anti-dumping ===
In addition to the food labeling claims that implied Vietnamese catfish of being raised in poor condition, the CFA accused the Vietnamese producers of dumping their products in the U.S. market. Since the Vietnamese catfish prices continued to sell in the U.S. market despite the food labeling action, the CFA claimed that Vietnamese catfish producers were heavily subsidized by the government. Therefore, their production costs were not accurate in reflecting the selling prices in the U.S. The U.S. required the Vietnamese producers to prove that they operated under free market condition without any government subsidy.

The Vietnamese producers responded that their low costs of production were due to cheaper labor, and favorable producing conditions. The flowing water of the Mekong helped in washing the fish, which contributed to the lower costs. Nevertheless, a delegation from the Department of Commerce was sent to investigate the anti-dumping claims. In 2003, the CFA won the case of anti-dumping, and authorized tariffs of up to 64 percent on the Vietnamese catfish.

=== Catfish quality inspection ===
Despite these trade barriers imposed by the U.S., Vietnamese catfish imports to the United States continues to rise. In 2008, the U.S. producers decided to lobby for another barrier to keep Vietnamese catfish out of the domestic market by propose an inspection requirement into the 2008 farm bill. According to this action, an inspection system was required so that all catfish production must meet the standard. This system is equivalent to U.S. inspections, which would be costly and significantly complicated to the Vietnamese producers to establish. The law also put the U.S. Department of Agriculture in charge of deciding the category and definition of catfish instead of the FDA.

The catfish quality inspection requirement from the 2008 farm bill posed yet another massive trade barrier to Vietnamese catfish producers in exporting their goods to the U.S. market.

== Aftermath ==
The catfish trade disputes affect the Vietnamese producers significantly, since they have agreed to the quota imposed by the US. In April 2003, the Vietnam Association of Seafood Exporters and Producers (VASEP) agreed to cut shipment volumes from 2003 to 2005, with penalties for exceeding quota. One of the largest export products of Vietnam was restricted by a series of trade barriers to protect domestic producers, particularly, the CFA in this case.

Nevertheless, the amount of frozen fish imported to the U.S. increased to 215 million pounds in 2014, which valued at more than $300 million a year. Despite the lawsuits and lobby efforts, U.S. catfish producers saw production fall by nearly 50 percent from 630 million pounds in 2004 to around 340 million in 2013. With the additional costs of labels and adopting the new inspection system, domestic producers are considering to eliminate catfish from their productions.

For American consumers, this trade dispute affected their budget negatively. Without the cheap catfish from Vietnam, U.S. consumers face higher prices from domestic producers. Consumers now will bear the costs of the label process as well as the USDA inspection requirement on each pound of catfish that they buy from domestic producers. Experts even predict that the action against foreign producers would force consumers to buy more Vietnamese catfish. Furthermore, other commodities and goods imported from Vietnam would likely to be at higher prices as Vietnam sought to retaliate in the dispute.

== Solution ==
The trade war for catfish has been unresolved for decades without a definite winner. Vietnamese officials have stated their concern of the new inspection program in 2008 as a disguise of protectionism. On the other hand, the USDA insists on moving forward with their inspection agenda. Efforts such as negotiations for the Trans-Pacific Partnership trade agreement including Japan, Vietnam and the U.S. showed little progress in resolving this trade dispute.

== See also ==
- Byrd Amendment
