= Scoloplax =

Scientific classification
- Kingdom: Animalia
- Phylum: Chordata
- Class: Actinopterygii
- Order: Siluriformes
- Suborder: Loricarioidei
- Family: Scoloplacidae; Bailey & Baskin, 1976
- Genus: Scoloplax; Bailey & Baskin, 1976

Type species
- Scoloplax dicra Bailey & Baskin, 1976

Genus of fishes

Scoloplax is a genus of freshwater ray-finned fishes, it is the only genus in the monotypic family Scoloplacidae, the spiny dwarf catfishes. The catfishes in this genus are found in South America.

== Taxonomy ==
Scoloplax was first proposed as a monospecific genus in 1976 by the American ichthyologists Reeve Maclaren Bailey and Jonathan N. Baskin when they described S. dicra.S, dicra was collected in 1964 on an expedition to Bolivia where it was caught in an oxbow near the Rio Itenez. Bailey and Baskin noted that this catfish was apparently closely related to the family Loricariidae and placed it in the new subfamily Scoloplacinae, which is now regarded as the family Scoloplacidae within the suborder Loricarioidei in the catfish order, Siluriformes.

== Species ==
Scoloplax contains the following recognized species:

- Scoloplax baileyi Rocha, Lazzarotto & Rapp Py-Daniel, 2012
- Scoloplax baskini Rocha, de Oliveira & Rapp Py-Daniel, 2008
- Scoloplax dicra Bailey & Baskin, 1976
- Scoloplax distolothrix Schaefer, Weitzman & Britski, 1989
- Scoloplax dolicholophia Schaefer, Weitzman & Britski, 1989
- Scoloplax empousa Schaefer, Weitzman & Britski, 1989 (Pantanal dwarf catfish)

== Distribution ==
Scoloplax is distributed in South America in Peru, Bolivia, Brazil, and Paraguay. S. baskini is from the small tributaries of Rio Aripuanã, Rio Madeira drainage, Amazonas State, Brazil. S. dicra has the largest distribution in the Amazon basin, originating from the Amazon and Paraguay River basins. S. distolothrix inhabits the Tocantins-Araguaia, Xingu, and Paraguay River basins. S. dolicholophia is known from the Rio Negro basin in Brazil, as well as the Lake Amanã. S. empousa lives in the Amazon and Paraguay-Paraná River basins.

== Description ==
Species of Scoloplax are readily distinguishable from other catfishes by the presence of a conspicuous shield-shaped rostral plate bearing numerous large and recurved odontodes. These fish have three rows of odontode-bearing plates, two bilateral series and one midventral series. There is also a rostral plate with many recurved odootodes. The adipose fin is absent. The greatest length reached is about 20 mm (0.79 in) SL.

Scoloplax species have modified stomachs that are enlarged, thin-walled, and clear. The esophagus enters the stomach along the dorsal side just posterior to the anterior margin of the stomach; the intestine exits the stomach ventrally. A small patch of muscular tissue represents the digestive portion of the stomach, located from the entrance of the esophagus to where the intestine exits. This modified stomach may be for buoyancy control or for breathing air.

== Ecology ==
Scoloplax species are fairly common among leaf litter in clear and blackwater habitats, including oxbow lakes, backwater pools, and well-vegetated streams.
