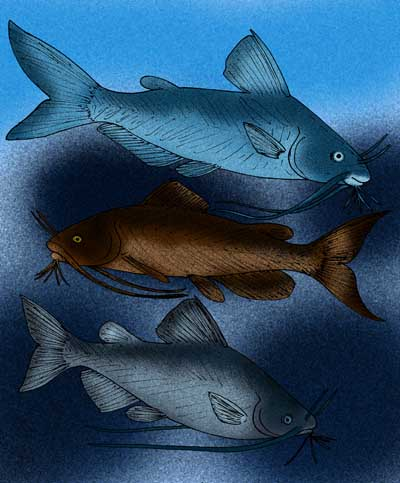
- Andinichthys, Hoffstetterichthys, and Incaichthys

Scientific classification
- Kingdom: Animalia
- Phylum: Chordata
- Class: Actinopterygii
- Order: Siluriformes
- Family: †Andinichthyidae; Gayet, 1988

Genera
- See text

= Andinichthyidae =

Andinichthyidae Temporal range: Maastrichtian–Eocene

Extinct family of catfishes

Andinichthyidae is a prehistoric family of basal catfishes from the Cretaceous to Eocene of South America.

== Species ==
The four species in four monotypic genera are:

- Genus Andinichthys Gayet, 1988.
  - Andinichthys bolivianensis Gayet, 1988.
- Genus Hoffstetterichthys Gayet, 1990.
  - Hoffstetterichthys pucai Gayet, 1990.
- Genus Incaichthys Gayet, 1990.
  - Incaichthys suarezi Gayet, 1990.
- Genus Yuskaichthys Bogan, Agnolin & Scanferla, 2018.
  - Yuskaichthys eocenicus Bogan, Agnolin & Scanferla, 2018.
