= Laocoon (disambiguation) =

Laocoon, or Laocoön, may refer to:

- Laocoön, the Trojan priest of Poseidon
- Laocoon (mythology), mythological characters named Laocoon.
- Laocoön and His Sons, a famous sculpture in Vatican City
- Laocoön (El Greco), an oil painting by El Greco
- Laocoön (Lessing): An Essay on the Limits of Painting and Poetry by Gotthold Ephraim Lessing
- Laocoön, William Blake's last illuminated work
- Asteroid 3240 Laocoon
