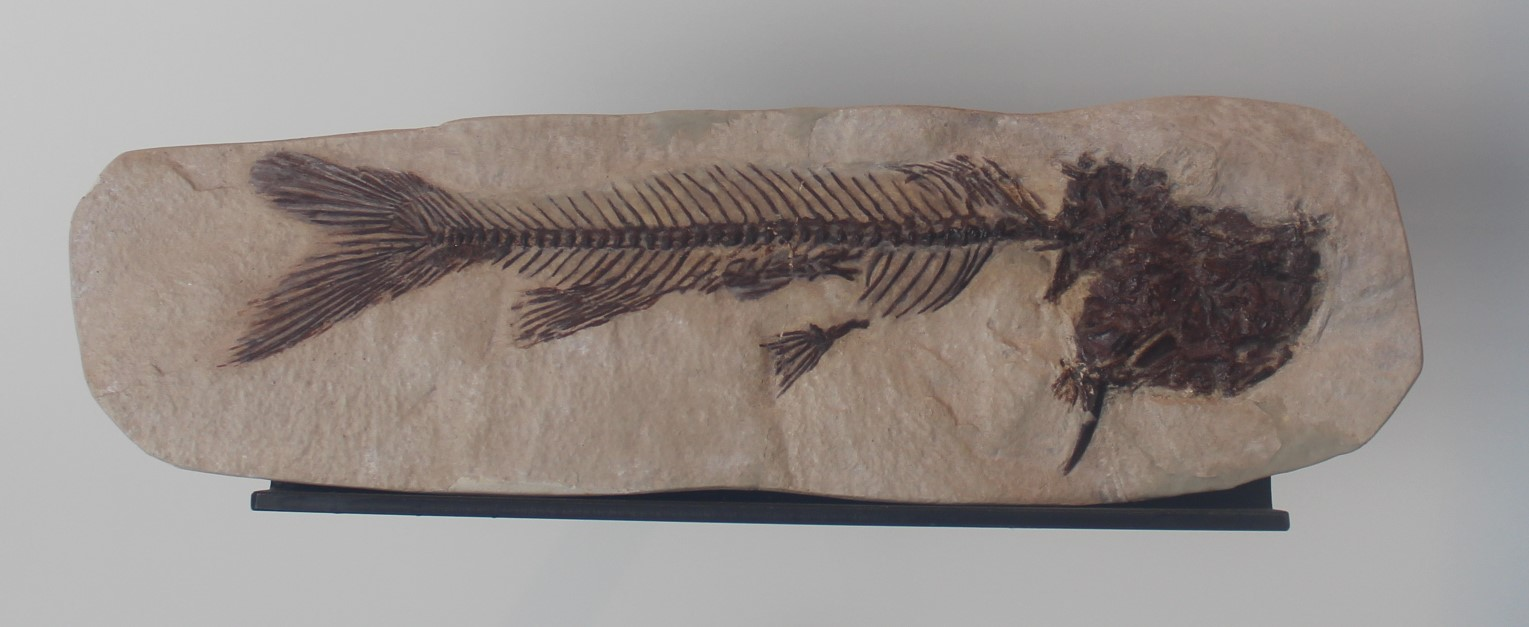
- H. farsonensis specimen, American Museum of Natural History

Scientific classification
- Kingdom: Animalia
- Phylum: Chordata
- Class: Actinopterygii
- Order: Siluriformes
- Suborder: Siluroidei
- Superfamily: †Hypsidoroidea
- Family: †Hypsidoridae; Grande, 1987
- Genus: †Hypsidoris; Lundberg & Case, 1970

Type species
- Hypsidoris farsonensis Lundberg & Case, 1970

Species
- Hypsidoris farsonensis Lundberg & Case, 1970; Hypsidoris oregonensis Grande & de Pinna, 1998

= Hypsidoris =

Hypsidoris Temporal range: Middle Eocene

Extinct genus of fishes

Hypsidoris (from Greek: ῠ̔́ψος hypsi, 'height' and Greek: δῶρις dôris 'dagger') is an extinct genus of catfish, classified within its own family Hypsidoridae, from the Eocene epoch of North America.

Hypsidoris was about 20 centimetres (7.9 in) long, with a size range up to 28.1 cm (11.06 in) and looked similar to the modern catfish, also possessing sensitive barbels used to detect prey in murky waters. It also had a vibration-sensitive organ called the Weberian apparatus, which consisted of specialized vertebrae at the front of the spinal column which passed vibrations to the inner ear, using the swim bladder as a resonance chamber. For defense against predators, Hypsidoris had large spines at the front of each pectoral fin. Like modern catfish, it would probably have eaten smaller fish, along with crayfish and other bottom-dwelling creatures.

There are two species. H. farsonensis is from the Early Middle Eocene of Wyoming and H. oregonensis is from the Middle Eocene of Oregon. H. farsonensis is known only from the Laney member of Lake Gosiute, in the Green River Formation, where it makes up less than 0.1% of the fish fauna; as of 2001, it was known from around 50 specimens.
