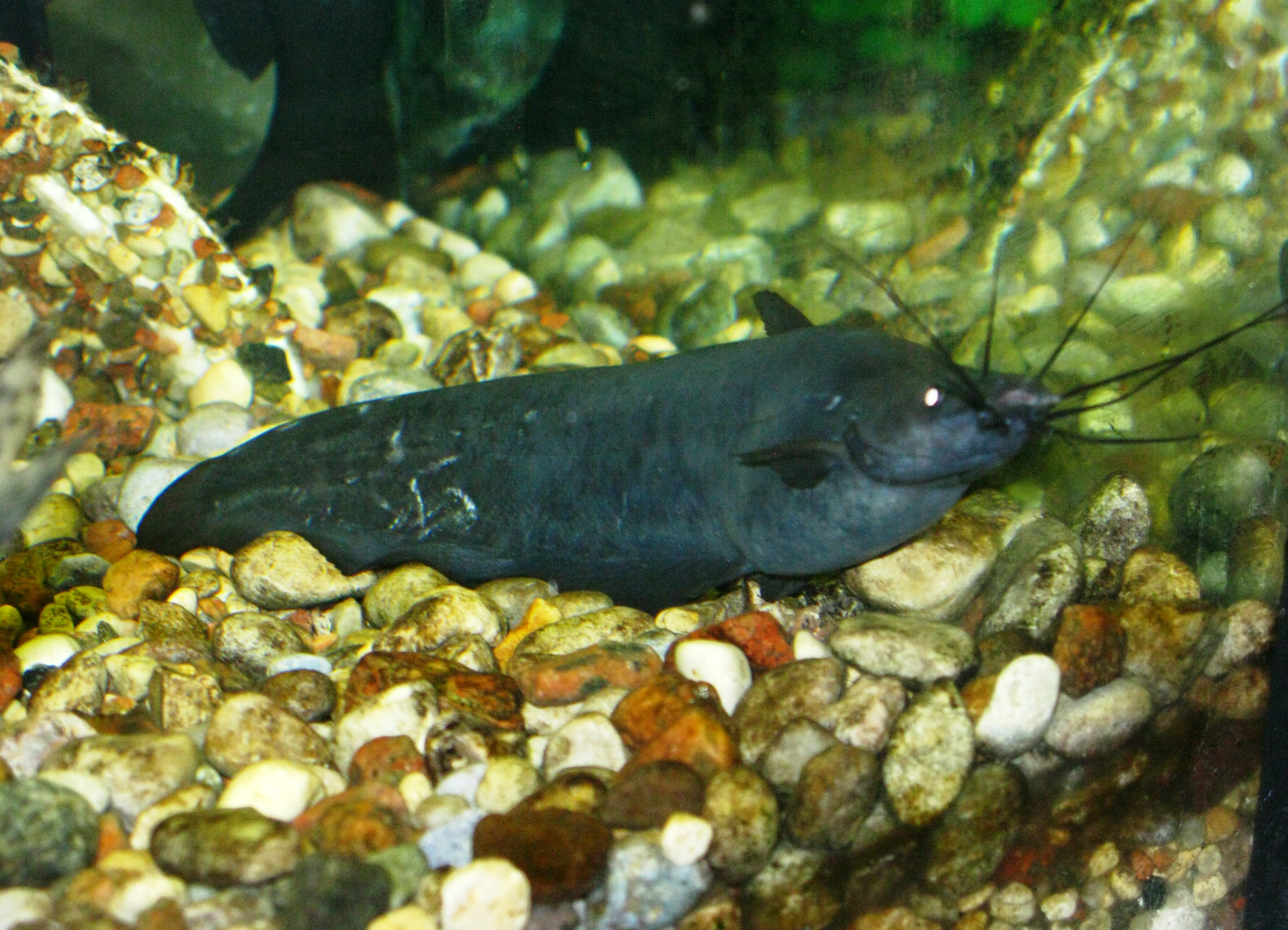
- Heteropneustes fossilis

Scientific classification
- Kingdom: Animalia
- Phylum: Chordata
- Class: Actinopterygii
- Division: Teleostei
- Order: Siluriformes
- Superfamily: Siluroidea
- Family: Clariidae; Hora, 1936
- Genus: Heteropneustes; J. P. Müller, 1840

Type species
- Silurus fossilis Bloch, 1794

Synonyms
- Saccobranchus; Valenciennes, 1840; Clarisilurus; Fowler, 1937

= Heteropneustes =

Genus of fishes

Heteropneustes is a genus of catfishes, the airsac catfishes, native to Asia. This genus has historically been placed in the monotypic family Heteropneustidae, but Eschmeyer's Catalog of Fishes now includes it in family Clariidae.

Their bodies are elongated and compressed with greatly depressed heads. They have long air sacs that serve as lungs that extend from the gill chamber. Their dorsal fins are short and have no spine. Their pectoral spines have an associated venom gland, so the fish are considered dangerous. They are oviparous; distinct pairing is possible.

== Species ==
Five species in this genus are recognized:

- Heteropneustes fossilis (Bloch, 1794) (stinging catfish)
- Heteropneustes fuscus Plamoottil, 2021 (Travancore black stinging catfish)
- Heteropneustes kemratensis (Fowler, 1937)
- Heteropneustes longipectoralis Rema Devi & Raghunathan, 1999
- Heteropneustes nani Hossain, Sarker, Sharifuzzaman & Chowdhury, 2013
