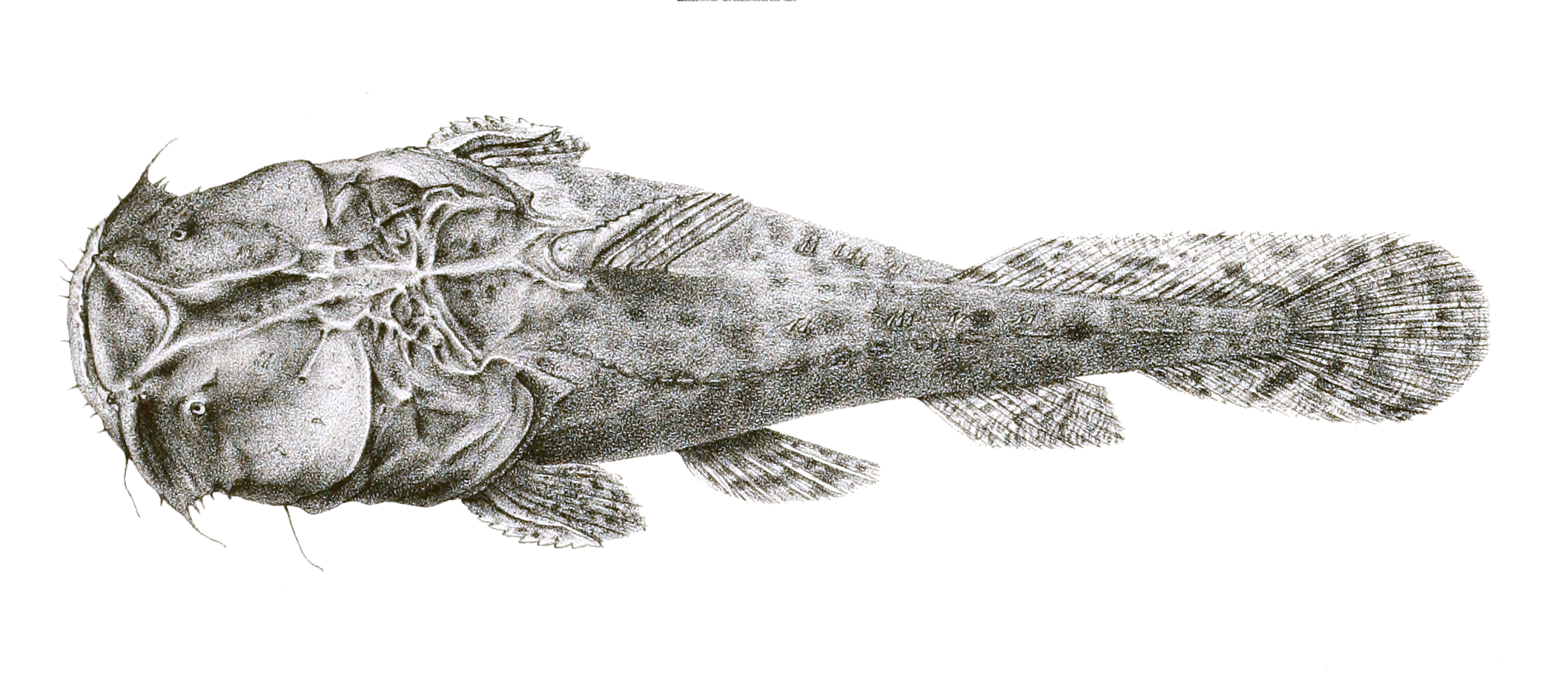
- Chaca chaca

Scientific classification
- Domain: Eukaryota
- Kingdom: Animalia
- Phylum: Chordata
- Class: Actinopterygii
- Order: Siluriformes
- Suborder: Siluroidei
- Superfamily: Siluroidea
- Family: Chacidae; Bleeker, 1858
- Genus: Chaca; J. E. Gray, 1831

Type species
- Platystacus chaca Hamilton, 1822

= Chaca (fish) =

Genus of fishes

Chaca is the only genus in the catfish family Chacidae. These fish are commonly known as squarehead catfishes, frogmouth catfishes, or angler catfishes. These unusual fish have a sedentary lifestyle and spend much of their time motionless.

The name Chaca is because, when removed from the water, they will rapidly repeat the sound "chaca". Only C. chaca makes these sounds; the other species do not.

== Species ==
The four currently recognized species in this genus are:

- Chaca bankanensis Bleeker, 1852 (angler catfish)
- Chaca burmensis B. A. Brown & Ferraris, 1988
- Chaca chaca (F. Hamilton, 1822) (squarehead catfish)
- Chaca serica H. H. Ng & Kottelat, 2012

== Distribution and habitat ==
Chaca species are found in fresh water from eastern India to Borneo.

C. chaca is found in rivers, canals, and ponds of grassland, scrubland, deciduous forest, and rainforest habitats. On the other hand, C. bankanensis is only found in the rainforest, where it inhabits peat.

== Appearance and anatomy ==
Chaca catfish have elongated, broad, and flattened heads. The mouths are terminal and very wide. Three or four pairs of barbels are found, though if the nasal barbels are present, they are minute. These fish grow to a length of about 20 cm (7.9 in).

The dorsal fin is short and possesses strong, serrated, fin spines, which are strong enough to inflict wounds.

== Ecology ==
These fish live in soft substrates where they bury themselves as camouflage, both for protection and to feed. They are found in slow-paced water in South Asia, particularly India, Bangladesh, and Myanmar These fish are ambush predators. They feed on prey such as small fish, including cyprinids and pupfishes. They lie in wait, well camouflaged, in preparation for prey to swim by. Sometimes, they use their maxillary barbels (attached to the upper jaw) to lure prey fish closer to their mouths, similar to a worm jerking in the water, although this behavior is contested by some aquarists, who do not observe this behavior. When the catfish is ready to strike, the Chaca will open its large mouth rapidly, creating a vacuum that pulls in water and its prey, which may be up to half the fish's own length. These fish are also able to use this large mouths as a means of propulsion; when frightened, they will gulp a large amount of water and expel it through their gills.

== In the aquarium ==
Chaca species are occasionally available as aquarium fish. They are nocturnal and are usually inactive. A bizarre phenomenon is shown in that Chaca species appear to lower the pH of the water, so maintenance of water chemistry is necessary. These fish have been bred in captivity.
