= Phreatobius cisternarum =

Conservation status
- Least Concern (IUCN 3.1)

Scientific classification
- Kingdom: Animalia
- Phylum: Chordata
- Class: Actinopterygii
- Order: Siluriformes
- Family: Phreatobiidae
- Genus: Phreatobius
- Species: P. cisternarum

Binomial name
- Phreatobius cisternarum Goeldi, 1905

Species of fish

Phreatobius cisternarum is a species of catfish in the genus Phreatobius. This Brazilian fish is one of the few fish species that live underground in phreatic habitats. It has proved problematic in its classification.

== Taxonomy ==
Phreatobius cisternarum was collected in 1903 and first described by E. A. Goeldi in 1905. This fish species and genus were redescribed in 2005.

== Distribution and habitat ==
Phreatobius cisternarum is found in Brazil. They inhabit underground habitats both north and south of the mouth of the Amazon River as well as the Marajó Island. This fish inhabits superficial, phreatic habitats, but does not live in the deeper artesian aquifers.

These fish are found commonly in hand-dug wells on Marajó. These wells are 4–13 metres (13–43 ft) deep. In these wells, these fish are more common during the dry season when the water depth recedes to about 30 centimetres (12 in), and are rarer during the rainy season when the depth can increase by several metres. The water is warm and acidic (pH 5–6).

== Physical characteristics ==
This small fish reaches a maximum length of 5.5 centimetres (2.2 in) SL. There is great variation between members of this species.

The head of this species is distinctly wider than the body. The integument is thick and opaque. The lateral line is reduced. The pelvic fin is highly variable in length between specimens, and can be reduced to finger-like projections. The red coloration is generally uniform over the body and head and is due to superficial blood; this red coloration does not extend to the fins. The fish is darker on the dorsal surface due to some pigmentation in the skin. The barbels are whitish and fade to transparent tips.

== Ecology ==
Phreatobius cisternarum hide and fit tightly within crevices of rocks, where they stay most of the time, leaving only for food. These fish are not a burrowing species, nor do they hide under vegetative matter, restricting themselves to these crevices. They do not interact much with each other and do not seem to be gregarious. Nothing is known about the reproductive habits of this species.

Phreatobius cisternarum feed on macro-invertebrates such as worms. They either swallow their prey whole, or take a bite out of it, rolling their body, and twisting a piece off. This firm grip is due to extremely large jaw muscles, which are well adapted to feeding on relatively large prey; worms eaten in captivity can be as long as the fish itself. It is unknown what invertebrates P. cisternarum actually feeds on in its natural habitat. Because food is rare in their environment, these fish are able to survive long periods of starvation, which is partially because of their inactivity. A captive individual did not feed for a year, but remained in good condition.

These fish indicate they have some form of respiration that allows them to breathe air, however this behavior is only exhibited under stressful conditions. It is supposed that these fish also have a form of cutaneous respiration, as they are small, live in conditions with low dissolved oxygen, and have high blood circulation to their skin (which provides its red coloration).
