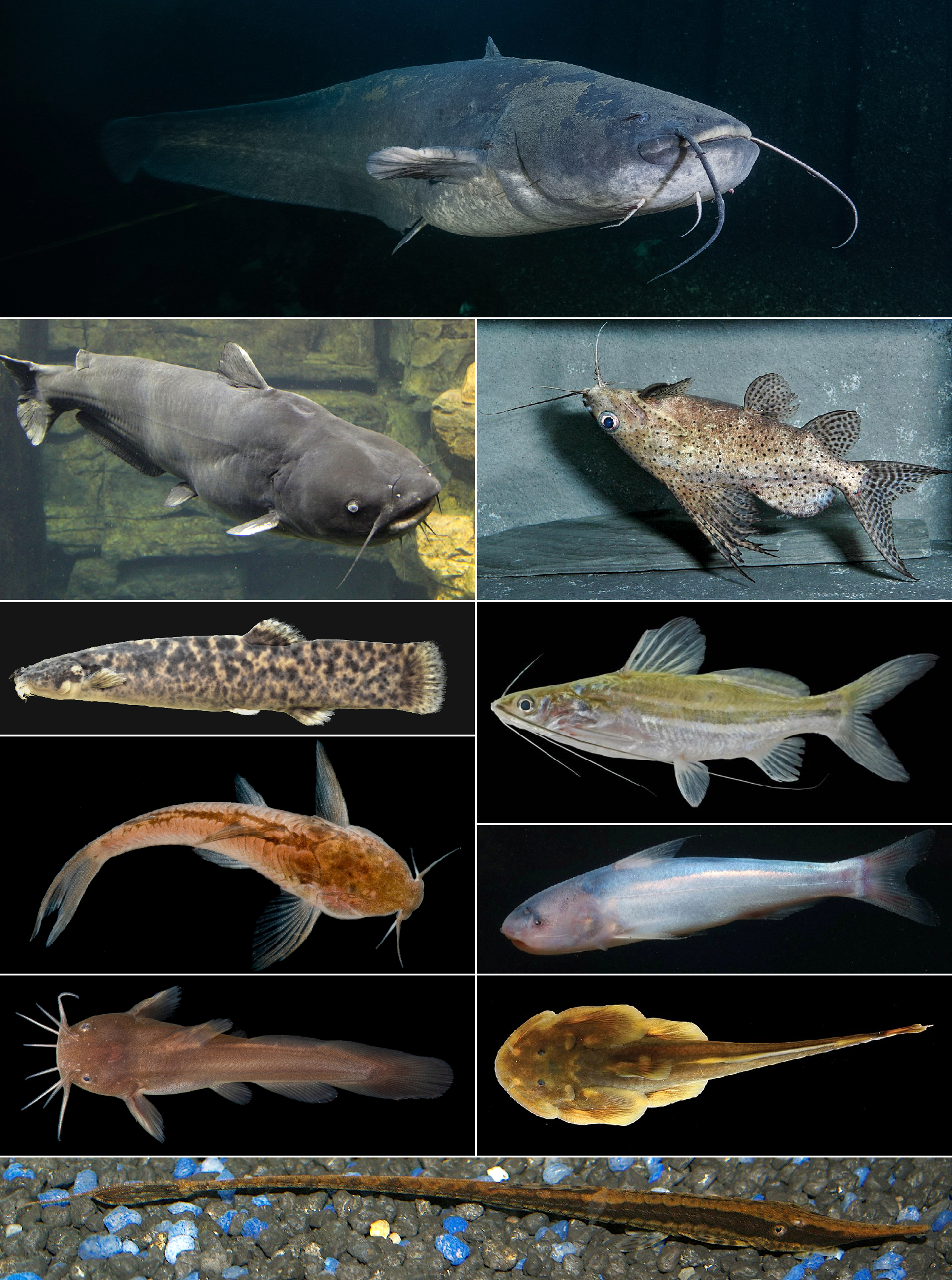
- Diversity of catfishes (left to right, top to bottom): Silurus glanis (Siluridae), Ictalurus furcatus (Ictaluridae), Synodontis eupterus (Mochokidae), Trichomycterus ytororo (Trichomycteridae), Mystus atrifasciatus (Bagridae), Aspidoras mephisto (Callichthyidae), Cetopsis coecutiens (Cetopsidae), Noturus gyrinus (Ictaluridae), Oreoglanis hponkanensis (Sisoridae), Farlowella vittata (Loricariidae)

Scientific classification
- Kingdom: Animalia
- Phylum: Chordata
- Class: Actinopterygii
- Division: Teleostei
- (unranked): Otophysi
- Order: Siluriformes; O. P. Hay, 1929

Type species
- Silurus glanis Linnaeus, 1758

Families
- See text

= Catfish =

Catfish Temporal range: Campanian–present Possible earlier Late Cretaceous records

Order of fish

Catfish are a diverse group of ray-finned fish of the order Siluriformes /sɪˈljʊərɪfɔːrmiːz/ (historically Nematognathi). Catfish are named for their prominent barbels, which resemble a cat's whiskers, though not all catfish have prominent barbels. All Siluriformes lack scales, instead possessing either smooth skin or armour-plated bodies. This order of fish are defined by features of the skull (such as maxillae modified into the barbels' bases) and swimbladder. Catfish range in size and behavior from the three largest species alive, the Mekong giant catfish from Southeast Asia, the wels catfish of Eurasia, and the piraíba of South America, to detritivorous and scavenging bottom feeders, down to the tiny ectoparasitic species known as the candiru.

In the Southern United States, catfish may be known by a variety of slang names, such as "mud cat", "polliwogs", or "chuckleheads". Such names are regional and unstandardized. For instance, "chucklehead" in one region may refer to a bullhead catfish but indicate blue catfish elsewhere.

Catfish as a group are of considerable commercial importance; many of the larger species are farmed or fished for food, such as the Pangasius (a shark catfish) and Clarias (like the walking catfish). Many of the smaller species, such as members of the genus Corydoras, are important in the aquarium hobby. Some species, such as plecos of the genus Pterygoplichthys, are prolific invasives due to the aquarium hobby.

== Description ==
Most catfish are bottom feeders. In general, they are negatively buoyant, which means that they usually sink rather than float due to a reduced gas bladder and a heavy, bony head. Catfish have a variety of body shapes, though most have a cylindrical body with a flattened ventrum to allow for benthic feeding. A flattened head allows for digging through the substrate, as well as perhaps serving as a hydrofoil. Some have a mouth that can expand to a large size and contains no incisiform teeth; catfish generally feed through suction or gulping rather than biting and cutting prey. Some families, though, notably the Loricariidae and Astroblepidae, have a suckermouth that allows them to fasten themselves to objects in fast-moving water.

Catfish do not have scales; their bodies are often naked. In some species, their mucus-covered skin is used in cutaneous respiration, where the fish breathes through its skin. In some catfish, the skin is covered in bony plates called scutes; some form of body armor appears in various ways within the order. In loricarioids and in the Asian genus Sisor, the armor is primarily made up of one or more rows of free dermal plates. Similar plates are found in large specimens of Lithodoras. These plates may be supported by vertebral processes, as in scoloplacids and in Sisor, but the processes never fuse to the plates or form any external armor. By contrast, in the subfamily Doumeinae (family Amphiliidae) and in hoplomyzontines (Aspredinidae), the armor is formed solely by expanded vertebral processes that form plates. Finally, the lateral armor of doradids, Sisor, and hoplomyzontines consists of hypertrophied lateral line ossicles with dorsal and ventral lamina.

Juvenile catfish, like other fish, have relatively large heads, eyes, and posterior median fins in comparison to larger, more mature individuals. These juveniles can be readily placed in their families, particularly those with highly derived fin or body shapes; in some cases, identification of the genus is possible. As far as known for most catfish, features that are often characteristic of species, such as mouth and fin positions, fin shapes, and barbel lengths, show little difference between juveniles and adults. For many species, pigmentation pattern is also similar in juveniles and adults. Thus, juvenile catfish generally resemble and develop smoothly into their adult form without distinct juvenile specializations. Exceptions to this are the ariid catfish, where the young retain yolk sacs late into juvenile stages, and many pimelodids, which may have elongated barbels and fin filaments or coloration patterns.

=== Sensory organs ===
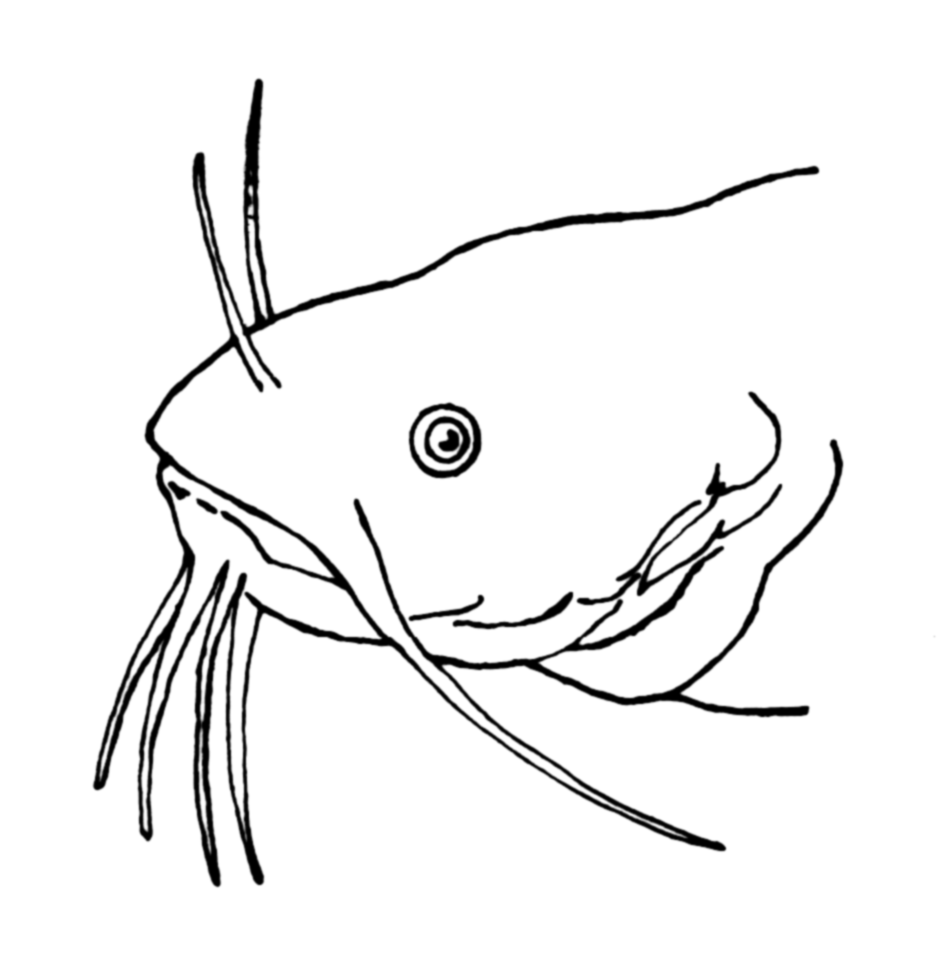
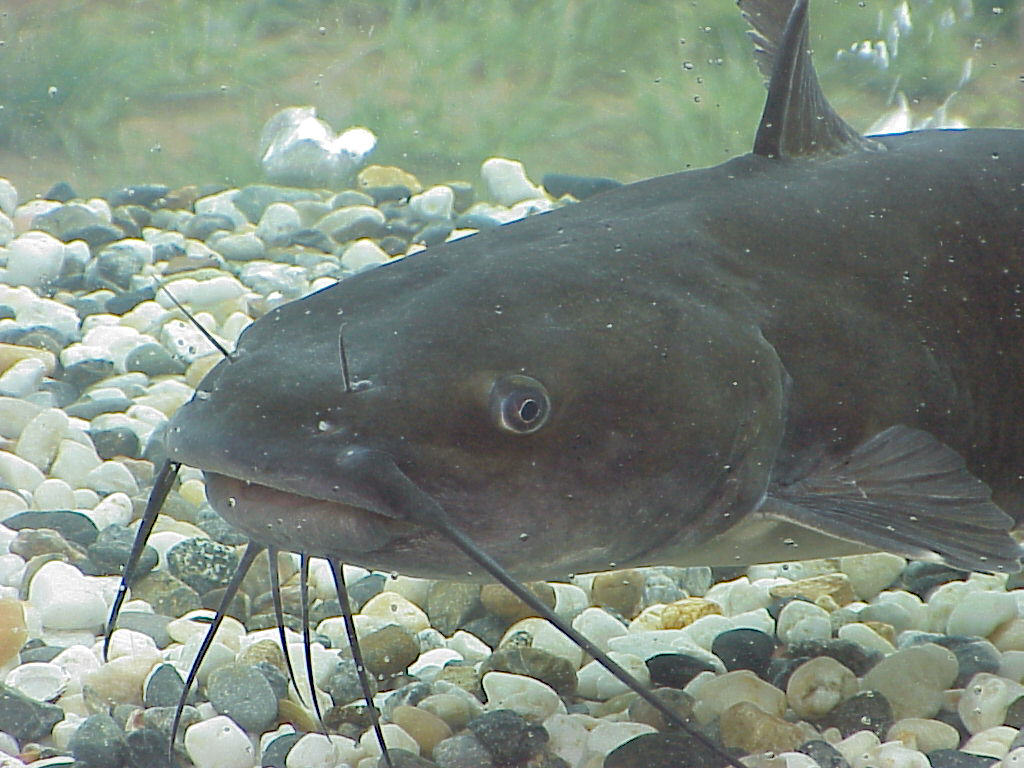
The channel catfish has four pairs of barbels.

The maxilla is a tooth-bearing bone in vertebrates, and modified in neopterygian fish to facilitate the protrusion of the mouth and enable suction feeding. Catfish, despite being a group of neopterygians, reduced the maxilla into a support for the maxillary barbels; this means that they are unable to protrude their mouths as other fish such as carp. Catfish barbels typically occur in pairs, and up to four pairs of barbels may be present in some species; these being the nasal, maxillary (on each side of mouth), and two pairs of "chin" barbels termed the internal and external mandibular barbel, though the various families often have fewer pairs, some species may have branched or duplicated barbel pairs, and a number of families only have extremely reduced maxillary barbels. The palatine-maxillary system is responsible for moving the maxillary barbels; it is a system of ligaments and muscles centred on these two skeletal elements. If severed, the barbels grow back over time, but the maxillary barbels cannot regenerate if their basal element (the maxilla) is lost.

Many larger catfish have chemoreceptors across their entire bodies (especially the barbels), which means they "taste" anything they touch, and "smell" any chemicals in the water. "In catfish, gustation plays a primary role in the orientation and location of food". Because barbels and chemoreception are more important in detecting food, their eyes are generally small, and many species lost them entirely as they adapted to underground environments, becoming cavefish. Like other ostariophysans, they are characterized by the presence of a Weberian apparatus. Their well-developed Weberian apparatus and reduced gas bladder allow for improved hearing and sound production.

=== Fin spines and toxins ===
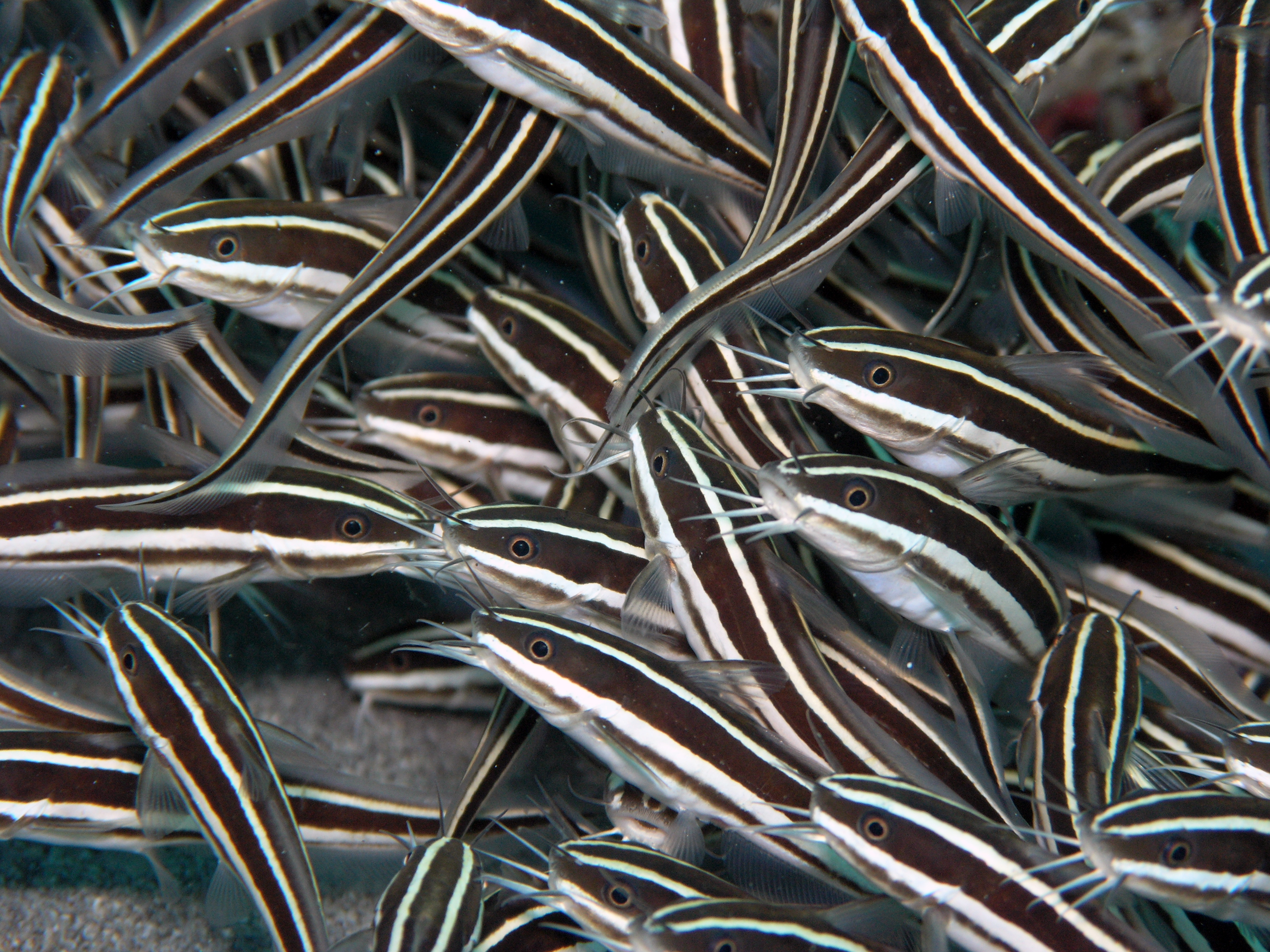
A sting from the striped eel catfish, Plotosus lineatus, may be fatal. These are juveniles

All catfish other than members of the Malapteruridae (electric catfish), possess a strong, hollow, bony, leading spine-like ray on their dorsal and pectoral fins. As a defense, these spines may be locked into place so that they stick outwards, enabling them to inflict severe wounds. In numerous catfish species, these fin rays can be used to deliver a stinging protein if the fish is irritated; as many as half of all catfish species may be venomous in this fashion, making the Siluriformes overwhelmingly the vertebrate order with the largest number of venomous species. This venom is produced by glandular cells in the epidermal tissue covering the spines. In members of the family Plotosidae and of the genus Heteropneustes, this protein is so potent it may hospitalize humans who receive a sting; in Plotosus lineatus, the stings can be lethal. The dorsal- and pectoral-fin spines are two of the most conspicuous features of siluriforms, and differ from those in other fish groups. Despite the widespread use of the spines for taxonomic and phylogenetic studies the fields have struggled to effectively use the information due to a lack of consistency in the nomenclature, with a general standard for the descriptive anatomy of catfish spines proposed in 2022 to try to resolve this problem.

=== Internal anatomy ===
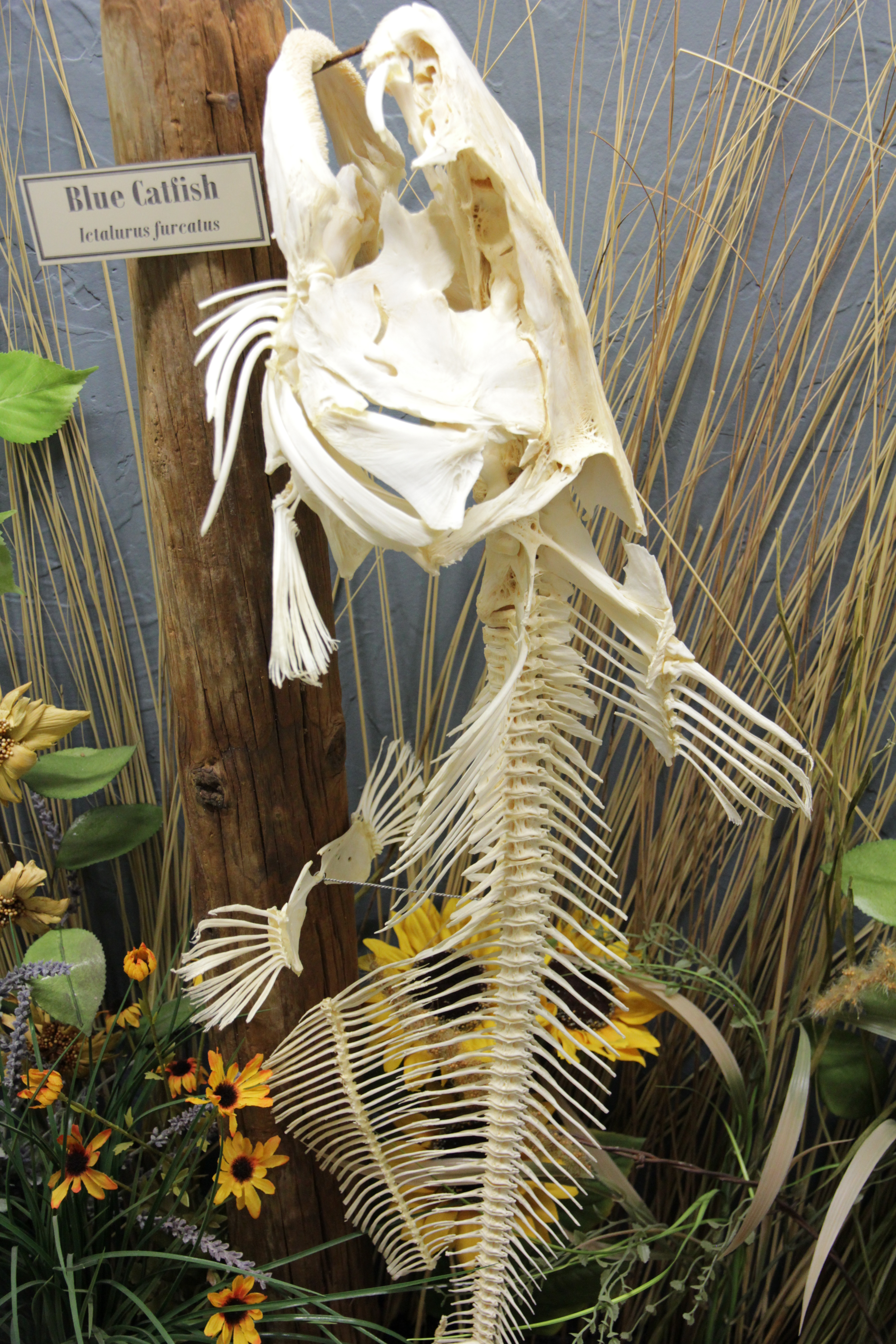
Blue catfish (Ictalurus furcatus) skeleton, Museum of Osteology

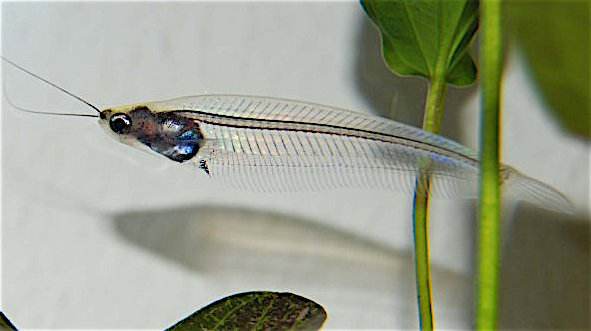
The internal organs of glass catfish (such as Kryptopterus vitreolus) are visible through their transparent bodies

In many catfish, the "humeral process" is a bony process extending backward from the pectoral girdle immediately above the base of the pectoral fin. It lies beneath the skin, where its outline may be determined by dissecting the skin or probing with a needle.

The retinae of catfish are composed of single cones and large rods. Many catfish have a tapetum lucidum, which may help enhance photon capture and increase low-light sensitivity. Double cones, though present in most teleosts, are absent from catfish.

==== Sexual characters ====
Sexual dimorphism is reported in about half of all families of catfish. The modification of the anal fin into an intromittent organ (in internal fertilizers) as well as accessory structures of the reproductive apparatus (in both internal and external fertilizers) have been described in species belonging to 11 different families.

The anatomical organization of the testis in catfish is variable among the families of catfish, but the majority of them present fringed testis: Ictaluridae, Claridae, Auchenipteridae, Doradidae, Pimelodidae, and Pseudopimelodidae. In the testes of some species of Siluriformes, organs and structures such as a spermatogenic cranial region and a secretory caudal region are observed, in addition to the presence of seminal vesicles in the caudal region. The total number of fringes and their length are different in the caudal and cranial portions between species. Fringes of the caudal region may present tubules, in which the lumen is filled by secretion and spermatozoa. Spermatocysts are formed from cytoplasmic extensions of Sertoli cells; the release of spermatozoa is allowed by breaking of the cyst walls.

The occurrence of seminal vesicles, in spite of their interspecific variability in size, gross morphology, and function, has not been related to the mode of fertilization. They are typically paired, multichambered, and connected with the sperm duct, and have been reported to play glandular and storage functions. Seminal vesicle secretion may include steroids and steroid glucuronides, with hormonal and pheromonal functions, but it appears to be primarily constituted of mucoproteins, acid mucopolysaccharides, and phospholipids.

Fish ovaries may be of two types - gymnovarian or cystovarian. In the first type, the oocytes are released directly into the coelomic cavity and then eliminated (released outside the body). In the second type, the oocytes are conveyed to the exterior through the oviduct. Many catfish are cystovarian in type, including Pseudoplatystoma corruscans, P. fasciatum, Lophiosilurus alexandri, and Loricaria lentiginosa.

=== Size ===
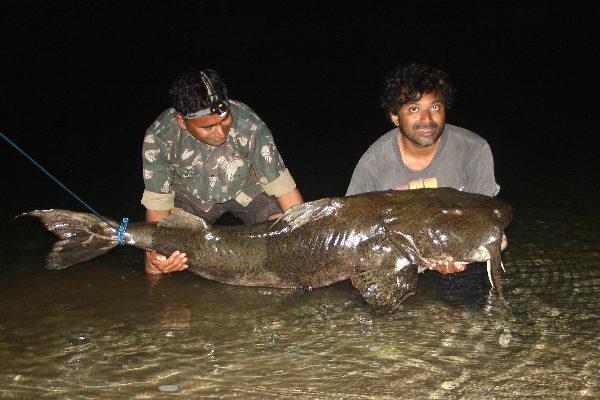
Giant Bagarius yarrelli (goonch) caught in India. Some goonch in the Kali River grow large enough to supposedly attack humans and water buffalo

Catfish have one of the largest ranges in size within a single order of bony fish. Many catfish have a maximum length of under 12 cm (4.7 in). Some of the smallest species of the Aspredinidae and Trichomycteridae reach sexual maturity at only 1 cm (0.39 in).

The wels catfish, Silurus glanis, and the much smaller related Aristotle's catfish, are the only catfish indigenous to Europe; the former ranges throughout Europe, and the latter is restricted to Greece. Mythology and literature record wels catfish of astounding proportions that have not been scientifically verified. The typical size of the species is about 1.2–1.6 m (3.9–5.2 ft), and fish more than 2 m (6.6 ft) are rare. However, they are known to exceed 2.5 m (8.2 ft) in length and 100 kg (220 lb) in weight. In July 2009, a catfish weighing 88 kilograms (194 lb) was caught in the River Ebro, Spain, by an 11-year-old British schoolgirl.

In North America, the largest Ictalurus furcatus (blue catfish) caught in the Missouri River on 20 July 2010 weighed 59 kg (130 lb). The largest flathead catfish, Pylodictis olivaris, ever caught was in Independence, Kansas, weighing 56 kg (123 lb) by Ken Paulie in the Elk City Reservoir on 19 May 1998, which was certified by the International Game Fish Association IGFA.

A Mekong giant catfish caught in northern Thailand on 1 May 2005, and reported to the press almost 2 months later weighed 293 kilograms (646 lb). This is the largest giant Mekong catfish caught since Thai officials started keeping records in 1981. Also in Asia, Jeremy Wade caught a 75.5-kilogram (166.4 lb) goonch following three fatal attacks on humans in the Kali River on the India-Nepal border. Wade was of the opinion that the offending fish must have been significantly larger than this to have taken an 18-year-old boy, as well as a water buffalo.

Piraíba (Brachyplatystoma filamentosum), a goliath catfish, can grow exceptionally large and are native to the Amazon Basin. They can occasionally grow to 200 kg (440 lb), as evidenced by numerous catches. Deaths from being swallowed by these fish have been reported in the region.

== Classification ==
Molecular evidence suggests that in spite of the great morphological diversity in the order, all catfish form a monophyletic group, originating from a common ancestor. Catfish belong to a superorder called the Ostariophysi, which also includes the Cypriniformes (carps and minnows), Characiformes (characins and tetras), Gonorynchiformes (milkfish and beaked salmons) and Gymnotiformes (South American knifefish), a superorder characterized by the Weberian apparatus. Some place Gymnotiformes as a sub-order of Siluriformes; however, this is not as widely accepted. Currently, the Siluriformes are said to be the sister group to the Gymnotiformes, though this has been debated due to more recent molecular evidence. As of 2007 there were about thirty-six extant catfish families, and about 3,093 extant species have been described. This makes the catfish order the second or third most diverse vertebrate order; in fact, one out of every twenty vertebrate species is a catfish.

The taxonomy of catfish is quickly changing. In a 2007 and 2008 paper, Horabagrus, Phreatobius, and Conorhynchos were not classified under any current catfish families. There is disagreement on the family status of certain groups; for example, Nelson (2006) lists Auchenoglanididae and Heteropneustidae as separate families, while the All Catfish Species Inventory (ACSI) includes them under other families. FishBase and the Integrated Taxonomic Information System lists Parakysidae as a separate family, while this group is included under Akysidae by both Nelson (2006) and ACSI. Many sources do not list the recently revised family Anchariidae. The family Horabagridae, including Horabagrus, Pseudeutropius, and Platytropius, is not shown by some authors but presented by others as a true group. Thus, the actual number of families differs between authors. The species count is in constant flux due to taxonomic work as well as description of new species. Between 2003 and 2005, over one hundred species were named, a rate three times faster than that of the past century. In June 2005, researchers named the newest family of catfish, Lacantuniidae, only the third new family of fish distinguished in the last seventy years, the others being the coelacanth in 1938 and the megamouth shark in 1983. The new species in Lacantuniidae, Lacantunia enigmatica, was found in the Lacantun river in the Mexican state of Chiapas.

The higher-level phylogeny of Siluriformes has gone through several recent changes, mainly due to molecular phylogenetic studies. While most studies, both morphological and molecular, agree that catfishes are arranged into three main lineages, the relationship among these lineages has been a contentious point in which these studies, performed for example by Rui Diogo, differ. The three main lineages in Siluriformes are the family Diplomystidae, the denticulate catfish suborder Loricarioidei (containing the Neotropical "suckermouth" catfishes), and the suborder Siluroidei, which contains the remaining families of the order. According to morphological data, Diplomystidae is usually considered to be the earliest branching catfish lineage and the sister group to the other two lineages, Loricarioidei and Siluroidei. Molecular evidence usually contrasts with this hypothesis, and shows the suborder Loricarioidei as the earliest branching catfish lineage, and sister to a clade that includes the Diplomystidae and Siluroidei; this phylogeny has been obtained in numerous studies based on genetic data. However, it has been suggested that these molecular results are errors as a result of long branch attraction, incorrectly placing Loricarioidei as the earliest-branching catfish lineage. When a data filtering method was used to reduce lineage rate heterogeneity (the potential source of bias) on their dataset, a final phylogeny was recovered which showed the Diplomystidae are the earliest-branching catfish, followed by Loricarioidei and Siluroidei as sister lineages, providing both morphological and molecular support for Diplomystidae being the earliest branching catfish.

The following classification is based on Eschmeyer's Catalog of Fishes:

- Order Siluriformes
  - Genus Conorhynchos Bleeker, 1858 (incertae sedis)
  - Suborder Diplomystoidei
    - Family Diplomystidae C. H. Eigenmann, 1890 (diplomystid catfishes)
  - Suborder Cetopsoidei
    - Family Cetopsidae Bleeker, 1858 (cetopsid catfishes)
  - Suborder Loricarioidei
    - Family Nematogenyidae Bleeker, 1862 (mountain catfishes)
    - Family Trichomycteridae Bleeker, 1858 (pencil catfishes)
    - Family Callichthyidae Bonaparte, 1835 (callichthyid armored catfishes)
    - Family Loricariidae Rafinesque, 1815 (suckermouth armored catfishes)
    - Family Scoloplacidae Bailey & Baskin, 1976 (spiny dwarf catfishes)
    - Family Astroblepidae Bleeker, 1862 (climbing catfishes)
  - Suborder Siluroidei
    - Family Chacidae Bleeker, 1858 (squarehead or angler catfishes)
    - Family Plotosidae Bleeker, 1858 (eeltail catfishes)
    - Family Ritidae Bleeker, 1862 (velvet catfishes)
    - Family Ailiidae Bleeker, 1858 (Asian schilbeids)
    - Family Horabagridae Jayaram, 2006 (imperial catfishes)
    - Family Bagridae Bleeker, 1858 (bagrid catfishes)
    - Family Akysidae Gill, 1861 (stream catfishes)
    - Family Amblycipitidae Day, 1873 (torrent catfishes)
    - Family Sisoridae Bleeker, 1858 (sisorid catfishes)
    - Family Pangasiidae Bleeker, 1858 (pangasid catfishes)
    - Family Siluridae Rafinesque, 1815 (sheatfishes; includes former Kryptoglanidae)
    - Family Aspredinidae Adams, 1854 (banjo catfishes)
    - Family Auchenipteridae Bleeker, 1862 (intromittant catfishes)
    - Family Doradidae Bleeker, 1858 (thorny catfishes)
    - Family Heptapteridae Gill, 1861 (seven-finned catfishes)
    - Family Phreatobiidae Reichel, 1927 (cistern catfishes)
    - Family Pimelodidae Bonaparte, 1835 (long-whiskered catfishes)
    - Family Pseudopimelodidae Fernández-Yépez & Antón, 1966 (bumblebee catfishes)
    - Family Clariidae Bonaparte, 1845 (airbreathing or labyrinth catfishes; includes airsac catfishes formerly placed in family Heteropneustidae)
    - Family Ariidae Bleeker, 1858 (sea catfishes)
    - Family Anchariidae Glaw & Vences, 1994 (Malagasy catfishes)
    - Family Austroglanididae Mo, 1991 (rock catlets)
    - Family Cranoglanididae Myers, 1931 (armorhead catfishes)
    - Family Ictaluridae Gill, 1861 (North American freshwater catfishes)
    - Family Lacantuniidae Rodiles-Hernández, Hendrickson & Lundberg, 2005 (Chiapas catfishes)
    - Family Amphiliidae Regan, 1911 (loach catfishes)
    - Family Malapteruridae Bleeker, 1858 (electric catfishes)
    - Family Mochokidae Regan, 1912 (squeakers and upside-down catfishes)
    - Family Auchenoglanididae Jayaram, 1966 (flatnose catfishes)
    - Family Claroteidae Bleeker, 1862 (grunter catfishes)
    - Family Schilbeidae Bleeker, 1858 (schilbeid catfishes)

=== Phylogeny ===
The following cladogram is based on a 2022 maximum likelihood phylogenetic tree of catfishes:

- - - Siluroidei
      ⊞See families
      ⊟
      - - - - - "Big Africa" clade
                - - Mochokidae
                  - - - Claroteidae
                      - Auchenoglanididae
                    - - Schilbeidae
                      - Malapteruridae
                - Amphiliidae
              - - - - Ictaluridae
                    - Cranoglanididae
                  - - Pangasiidae
                    - Austroglanididae
                - Ariidae
            - - Siluridae
              - - Pimelodidae
                - Pseudopimelodidae
          - "Big Asia" clade
            - - Sisoridae
              - Amblycipitidae
            - - Bagridae
              - - Horabagridae
                - Ailiidae
        - - - Clariidae
            - Heteropneustidae
          - - - Auchenipteridae
              - Doradidae
            - Aspredinidae
      - - - Plotosidae
          - Chacidae
        - - Cetopsidae
          - Ritidae
    - Diplomystoidei
      Diplomystidae
  - Loricarioidei
    ⊞See families
    ⊟
    - - Loricariidae
      - Astroblepidae
    - - Callichthyidae
      - Trichomycteridae
- Gymnotiformes (outgroup)

Phylogeny of living Siluriformes based on 2017 and extinct families based on Nelson, Grande & Wilson 2016.

- Siluriformes
  - †Andinichthyidae
  - - Loricaroidei
      ⊞See families
      ⊟
      - - Nematogenyidae
        - Trichomycteridae
      - - Callichthyidae
        - - Astroblepidae
          - Loricariidae
    - - Diplomystoidei
        - Diplomystidae
        - †Bachmanniidae
      - Siluroidei
        ⊞See families
        ⊟
        - Hypsidoroidea
          †Hypsidoridae
        - - Cetopsoidea
            Cetopsidae
          - - Siluroidea
              Siluridae
            - - - - Arioidea
                    Pangasiidae
                  - Big African catfishes
                    - Mochokidae
                    - Claroteidae
                - - Ictaluroidea
                    - Plotosidae
                    - Ictaluridae
                  - - Clarioidea
                      Clariidae
                    - Sisoroidea
                      - Ailiidae
                      - - Sisoridae
                        - Bagridae
              - - Doradoidea
                  - Aspredinidae
                  - - Doradidae
                    - Auchenipteridae
                - Pimelodoidea
                  - Heptapteridae
                  - - Pseudopimelodidae
                    - Pimelodidae

=== Evolution ===
Catfish are believed to have a Gondwanan origin primarily centered around South America, as the most basal living catfish groups are known from there. The earliest known definitive members lived in the Americas from the Campanian to Maastrichtian stages of the Late Cretaceous, including the Andinichthyidae, Vorhisia vulpes and possibly Arius. A potential fossil record is known from the earlier Coniacian-Santonian stages in Niger of West Africa, though this has been considered unreliable, and the putative earliest armored catfish known from the fossil record, Afrocascudo, lived during the Cenomanian age of the Late Cretaceous in Morocco of North Africa (Kem Kem Group). The describers of Afrocascudo claimed that the presence of a derived loricariid so early on would indicate the extensive diversification of catfish, or at least loricarioids, prior to the beginning of the Late Cretaceous. As extant loricariids are only known from South America, much of this diversification must have occurred on the supercontinent of West Gondwana prior to its fragmentation into South America and Africa. Britz and colleagues suggested that Afrocascudo instead represents a juvenile obaichthyid lepisosteiform, possibly a junior synonym of Obaichthys. The authors of the original study still stood by their original conclusion based on the absence of important holostean characters, and noted that it could not be a juvenile, since the bones were completely ossified.

==== Fossil taxa ====
- Order Siluriformes
  - Family †Andinichthyidae (Late Cretaceous to Paleogene of South America)
  - Suborder Diplomystoidei
    - Family †Bachmanniidae (Eocene of Argentina)
  - Suborder Siluroidei
    - Family †Astephidae (Paleocene to Oligocene of North America)
    - Family †Hypsidoridae (Eocene of North America)

== Distribution and habitat ==
Catfish live inland or in coastal waters of every continent except Antarctica. Catfish have inhabited all continents at one time or another. They are most diverse in tropical South America, Asia, and Africa, with one family native to North America and one family in Europe. More than half of all catfish species live in the Americas. They are the only ostariophysans that have entered freshwater habitats in Madagascar, Australia, and New Guinea.

They are found in fresh water/brackish water environments, with most inhabiting shallow, running water. Representatives of at least eight families are hypogean (live underground) with three families that are also troglobitic (inhabiting caves). One such species is Phreatobius cisternarum, known to live underground in phreatic habitats. Numerous species from the families Ariidae and Plotosidae, and a few from Aspredinidae and Bagridae, are found in salt water.

== Behavior ==
Many catfish are nocturnal, but others (many Auchenipteridae) are crepuscular or diurnal (most Loricariidae or Callichthyidae, for example).

=== Communication ===
Catfish can produce different types of sounds and also have well-developed auditory reception used to discriminate between sounds with different pitches and velocities. They are also able to determine the distance of the sound's origin and from what direction it originated. This is a very important fish communication mechanism, especially during agonistic and distress behaviors. Catfish are able to produce a variety of sounds for communication that can be classified into two groups: drumming sounds and stridulation sounds. The variability in catfish sound signals differs due to a few factors: the mechanism by which the sound is produced, the function of the resulting sound, and physiological differences such as size, sex, and age.

To create a drumming sound, catfish use an indirect vibration mechanism using the swimbladder as a resonating chamber. In these fishes, special sound-producing muscles (sonic muscles) insert on the ramus Mulleri, also known as the elastic spring. The sonic muscles pull the elastic spring forward and extend the swimbladder. When the muscles relax, the tension in the spring quickly returns the swimbladder to its original position, which produces the sound.

In stridulators, the sound-generating mechanism is found in their pectoral fins; the first pectoral fin ray or spine can be moved by large abductor and adductor muscles. The base of the catfishes' spines has a sequence of ridges, and the spine normally slides within a groove on the fish's pelvic girdle during routine movement; but, pressing the ridges on the spine against the pelvic girdle groove creates a series of short pulses. The movement is analogous to a finger moving down the teeth of a comb, and consequently a series of sharp taps is produced.

Sound-generating mechanisms are often different between the sexes. In some catfish, pectoral fins are longer in males than in females of similar size, and differences in the characteristic of the sounds produced were also observed. Comparison between families of the same order of catfish demonstrated family and species-specific patterns of vocalization, according to a study by Maria Clara Amorim. During courtship behavior in three species of Corydoras catfish, all males actively produced stridulation sounds before egg fertilization, and the species' songs were different in pulse number and sound duration.

Sound production in catfish may also be correlated with fighting and alarm calls. According to a study by Kaatz, sounds for disturbance (e.g. alarm) and agonistic behavior were not significantly different, which suggests distress sounds can be used to sample variation in agonistic sound production. However, in a comparison of a few different species of tropical catfish, some fish put under distress conditions produced a higher intensity of stridulatory sounds than drumming sounds. Differences in the proportion of drumming versus stridulation sounds depend on morphological constraints, such as different sizes of drumming muscles and pectoral spines. Due to these constraints, some fish may not even be able to produce a specific sound. In several different species of catfish, aggressive sound production occurs during cover site defense or during threats from other fish. More specifically, in long-whiskered catfish, drumming sounds are used as a threatening signal and stridulations are used as a defense signal. Kaatz investigated 83 species from 14 families of catfish, and determined that catfish produce more stridulatory sounds in disturbance situations and more swimbladder sounds in intraspecific conflicts.

== Relation to humans ==
=== Food ===
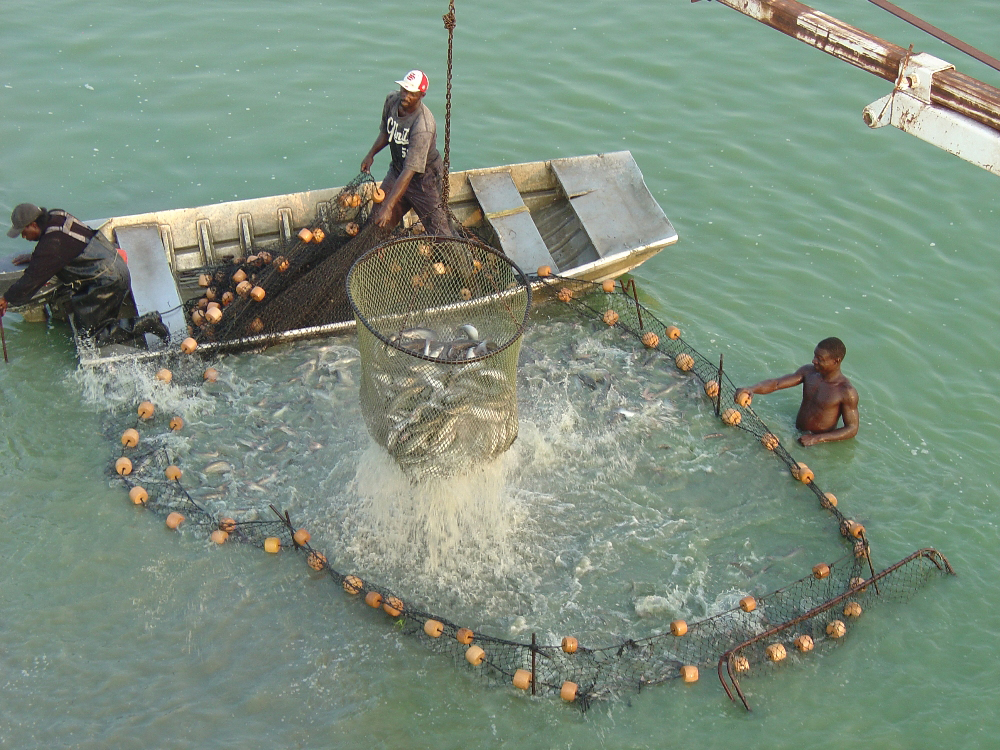
Loading U.S. farm-raised catfish.

Catfish are easy to farm in warm climates and are often sold cheaply by local grocers. About 60% of U.S. farm-raised catfish are grown within a 65-mile (100-km) radius of Belzoni, Mississippi. Channel catfish (Ictalurus punctatus) support a $450 million/yr aquaculture industry. The largest producers are located in the Southern United States, including Mississippi, Alabama, and Arkansas.

Catfish raised in inland tanks or channels are usually considered safe for the environment, since their waste and disease should be contained and not spread to the wild.

In Asia, many catfish species are important as food. Several airbreathing catfish (Clariidae) and shark catfish (Pangasiidae) species are heavily cultured in Africa and Asia. Exports of one particular shark catfish species from Vietnam, Pangasius bocourti, have met with pressures from the U.S. catfish industry. In 2003, the United States Congress passed a law preventing the imported fish from being labeled as catfish, this being the conclusion of the so-called Catfish Dispute. As a result, the Vietnamese exporters of this fish now label their products sold in the U.S. as "basa fish". Trader Joe's has labeled frozen fillets of Vietnamese Pangasius hypophthalmus as "striper".

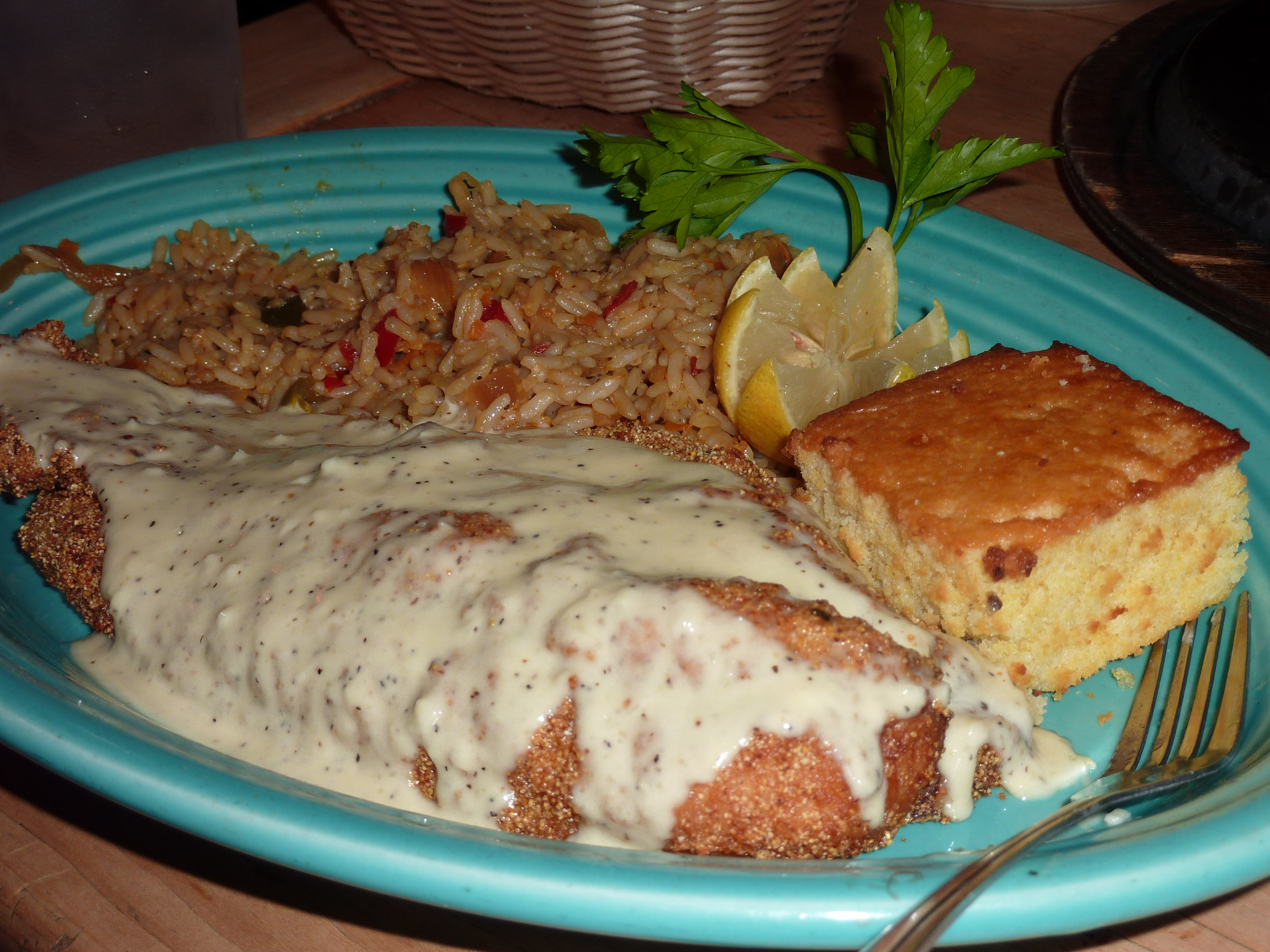
Fried catfish from the cuisine of New Orleans

Catfish have widely been caught and farmed for food for thousands of years in Africa, Asia, Europe, and North America. Opinions of their quality and flavor vary, with some food critics considering catfish excellent and others dismissing them as watery and lacking in flavor. Catfish is high in vitamin D. Farm-raised catfish contains low levels of omega-3 fatty acids and a much higher proportion of omega-6 fatty acids.

In Central Europe, catfish were often viewed as a delicacy to be enjoyed on feast days and holidays. Migrants from Europe and Africa to the United States brought along this tradition, and in the Southern United States, catfish is extremely popular.

The most commonly eaten species in the United States are the channel catfish and the blue catfish, both common in the wild and increasingly widely farmed. Farm-raised catfish became such a staple of the U.S. diet that President Ronald Reagan proclaimed National Catfish Day on 25 June 1987, to recognize "the value of farm-raised catfish."

Catfish is prepared in a variety of ways. In Europe, it is often cooked in similar ways to carp, but in the United States it is popularly crumbed with cornmeal and fried.

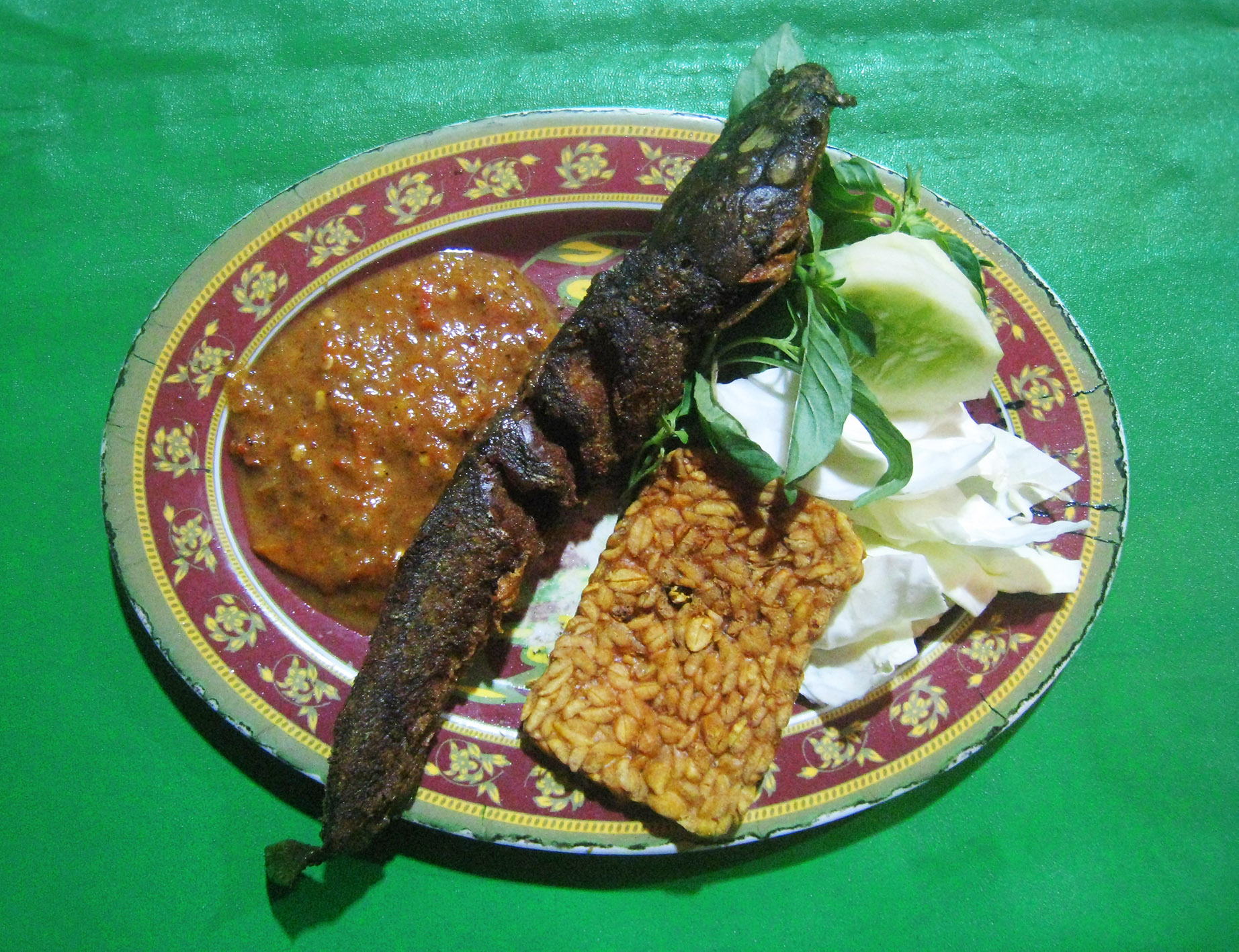
Pecel lele served with sambal, tempeh and lalab vegetables in a tent warung in Jakarta, Indonesia

In Indonesia, catfish is usually served fried or grilled in street stalls called warung and eaten with vegetables, sambal (a spicy relish or sauce), and usually nasi uduk (traditional coconut rice). The dish is called pecel lele or pecak lele. Lele is the Indonesian word for catfish. The same dish can also be called as lele penyet (squashed catfish) if the fish is lightly squashed along with sambal with a stone mortar-and-pestle. The pecel or pecak version presents the fish in a separate plate while the mortar is solely for sambal.

In Malaysia, catfish is called ikan keli and is fried with spices or grilled and eaten with tamarind and Thai chili gravy and is also often eaten with steamed rice.

In Bangladesh and the Indian states of Odisha, West Bengal and Assam, catfish (locally known as magur) is eaten as a favored delicacy during the monsoons. In the Indian state of Kerala, the local catfish, known as thedu', etta or "mushi" in Malayalam, is also popular.

In Hungary, catfish is often cooked in paprika sauce (Harcsapaprikás) typical of Hungarian cuisine. It is traditionally served with pasta smothered with curd cheese (túrós csusza).

In Myanmar (formerly Burma), catfish is usually used in mohinga, a traditional noodle fish soup cooked with lemon grass, ginger, garlic, pepper, banana stem, onions, and other local ingredients.

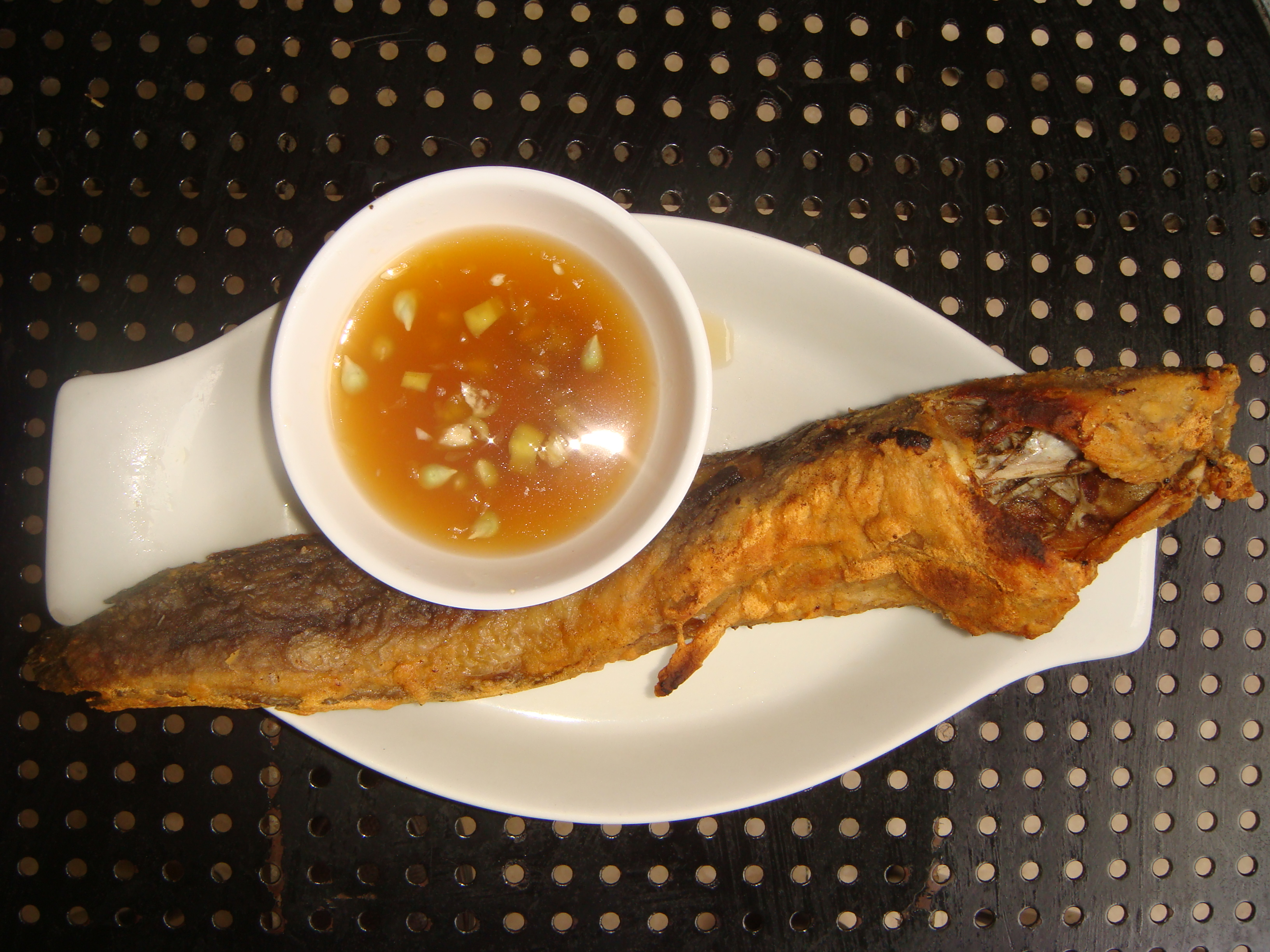
Filipino fried hito (catfish) with vinegar and kalamansi dip sauce

Vietnamese catfish, of the genus Pangasius, cannot be legally marketed as catfish in the United States, and so is referred to as swai or basa. Only fish of the family Ictaluridae may be marketed as catfish in the United States. In the UK, Vietnamese catfish is sometimes sold as "Vietnamese river cobbler", although more commonly as basa.

In Nigeria, catfish is often cooked in a variety of stews. It is particularly cooked in a delicacy popularly known as "catfish pepper soup" which is enjoyed throughout the nation.

In Jewish dietary law, known as kashrut, fish must have fins and scales to be kosher. Since catfish lack scales, they are not kosher.

=== Mythology ===
In the mythology of the Japanese Shinto religion, natural phenomena are caused by kami. Earthquakes are caused by a giant catfish called Namazu. There are other kami associated with earthquakes. In Kyoto it's usually an eel, but after the 1855 Edo earthquake, Namazu-e (鯰絵; "catfish prints") were printed, giving more popularity to the catfish kami that has been known since the 16th century Otsu-e. In one catfish print the divine white horse of Amaterasu is depicted knocking down the earthquake-causing catfish.

=== In aquaria ===
There is a large and growing ornamental fish trade, with hundreds of species of catfish, such as Corydoras and armored suckermouth catfish (often called plecos), being a popular component of many aquaria. Other catfish commonly found in the aquarium trade are banjo catfish, talking catfish, and long-whiskered catfish.

=== As invasive species ===
Representatives of the genus Ictalurus have been introduced into European waters in the hope of obtaining a sporting and food resource, but the European stock of American catfishes has not achieved the dimensions of these fish in their native waters and have only increased the ecological pressure on native European fauna. Walking catfish have also been introduced in the freshwater areas of Florida, with the voracious catfish becoming a major alien pest there. Flathead catfish, Pylodictis olivaris, is also a North American pest on Atlantic slope drainages. Pterygoplichthys species, released by aquarium fishkeepers, have also established feral populations in many warm waters around the world.

== See also ==
- Lotidae
