= Glass catfish =

Glass catfish may mean:

- African glass catfish, which may refer to these species of Schilbeidae:
  - Pareutropius debauwi
  - Parailia somalensis or "Somalia glass catfish"
- Asian glass catfish or Kryptopterus, a genus of fish in the family Siluridae:
  - Kryptopterus bicirrhis or "glass catfish"
  - Kryptopterus vitreolus or "ghost catfish"
