= Kryptopterus piperatus =

Conservation status
- Vulnerable (IUCN 3.1)

Scientific classification
- Kingdom: Animalia
- Phylum: Chordata
- Class: Actinopterygii
- Order: Siluriformes
- Family: Siluridae
- Genus: Kryptopterus
- Species: K. piperatus

Binomial name
- Kryptopterus piperatus H. H. Ng, Wirjoatmodjo & Hadiaty, 2004

Species of fish

Kryptopterus piperatus is a species of Asian glass catfish from rivers in northern Sumatra, Indonesia. It was first described in 2004. True K. piperatus is rarely (if ever) seen in the aquarium trade, while K. vitreolus is common.

Among described species of Kryptopterus, only three species are clearly transparent: K. vitreolus, K. minor and K. piperatus. The body of others, including K. bicirrhis, are only somewhat translucent or opaque.
