= Pterocryptis bokorensis =

Conservation status
- Data Deficient (IUCN 3.1)

Scientific classification
- Kingdom: Animalia
- Phylum: Chordata
- Class: Actinopterygii
- Order: Siluriformes
- Family: Siluridae
- Genus: Pterocryptis
- Species: P. bokorensis

Binomial name
- Pterocryptis bokorensis (Pellegrin & Chevey, 1937)

Synonyms
- Penesilurus bokorensis Pellegrin & Chevey, 1937; Silurus bokorensis (Pellegrin & Chevey, 1937)

Species of catfish

Pterocryptis bokorensis is a species of catfish found in the Mekong basin.

This species reaches a length of 15.0 cm (5.9 in).

== Etymology ==
The fish is named in honor of Bokor, Cambodia, elevation 800-1000 meters, the type locality.
