= Club-barbel sheatfish =

Conservation status
- Critically Endangered (IUCN 3.1)

Scientific classification
- Kingdom: Animalia
- Phylum: Chordata
- Class: Actinopterygii
- Order: Siluriformes
- Family: Siluridae
- Genus: Ceratoglanis
- Species: C. pachynema

Binomial name
- Ceratoglanis pachynema Ng, 1999

Synonyms
- Ceratoglanis pachynemus Ng, 1999; Ceratoglanis scleronema (non Bleeker, 1862) [misapplied]; Hemisilurus scleronema (non Bleeker, 1862) [misapplied]

Species of fish

Club-barbel sheatfish (Ceratoglanis pachynema) is a species of freshwater ray-finned fish, a sheatfish belonging to the family Siluridae.

It is a catfish with a small head showing a faint reddish hue. The small mouth is located on the underside, with a pair of short barbels near the nostrils resembling the shape of a padlock shackle, which is the origin of its name. The eyes are very small. The body is laterally compressed, pinkish or whitish in color, with fins edged in darker tones. The anal fin is particularly long. The average body length is about 25 cm (9.8 in), with the largest specimens reaching up to 40 cm (16 in)

It displays a behavior of rapidly flicking its barbels while swimming, reaching as many as 125 flicks·min⁻¹. This is believed to serve as a signaling mechanism to detect food along the riverbed. Its diet includes benthic animals such as shrimp and aquatic insects.

The species is endemic to a single location, the Bang Pakong basin in eastern Thailand, particularly in Chachoengsao Province. In the wild, its conservation status is currently regarded as critically endangered.

This species of catfish is commonly known in Thai as sai yu (Thai: สายยู, pronounced [sǎːj jūː]), which literally translates as "hasp". However, this name is also applied to other species, such a Platytropius siamensis in the family Schilbeidae that are now extinct, as well as to several catfishes in the family Pangasiidae.
