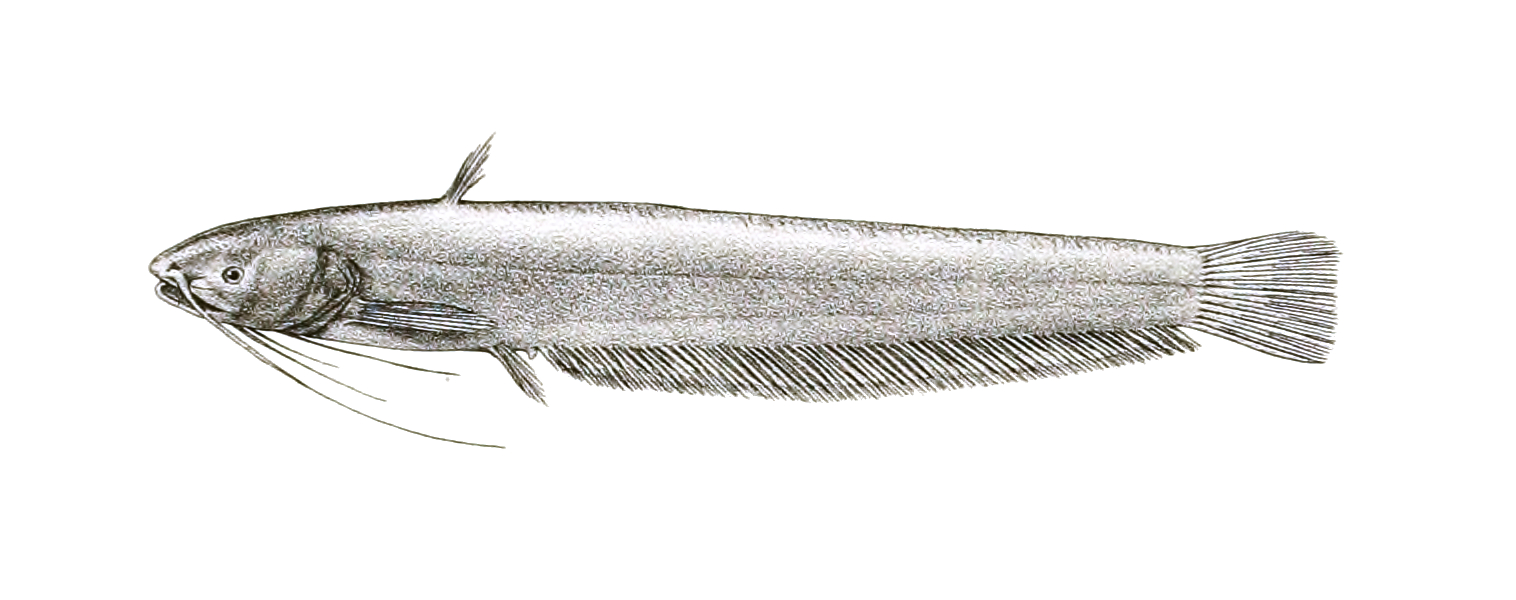

Conservation status
- Least Concern (IUCN 3.1)

Scientific classification
- Kingdom: Animalia
- Phylum: Chordata
- Class: Actinopterygii
- Order: Siluriformes
- Family: Siluridae
- Genus: Pterocryptis
- Species: P. cochinchinensis

Binomial name
- Pterocryptis cochinchinensis (Valenciennes, 1840)

Synonyms
- Silurus cochinchinensis Valenciennes, 1840; Parasilurus cochinchinensis (Valenciennes, 1840)

= Pterocryptis cochinchinensis =

Species of catfish

Pterocryptis cochinchinensis is a species of catfish found in the Nam Xam basin in Laos, Vietnam, south-eastern China, and Thailand.

This species reaches a length of 40.1 cm (15.8 in).

== Genomics ==
A near telomere-to-telomere genome assembly of Pterocryptis cochinchinensis was published in 2026. The genome size is approximately 931.7 Mb, with the assembly anchored to 28 chromosomes. The assembly has a BUSCO completeness of 96.7%, and 28,079 protein-coding genes were functionally annotated.

== Type Locality ==
The type locality is listed as Cochinchine.

== Etymology ==
The fish is named in honor of Cochinchine, now known as southern Vietnam, which is the type locality of the fish.
