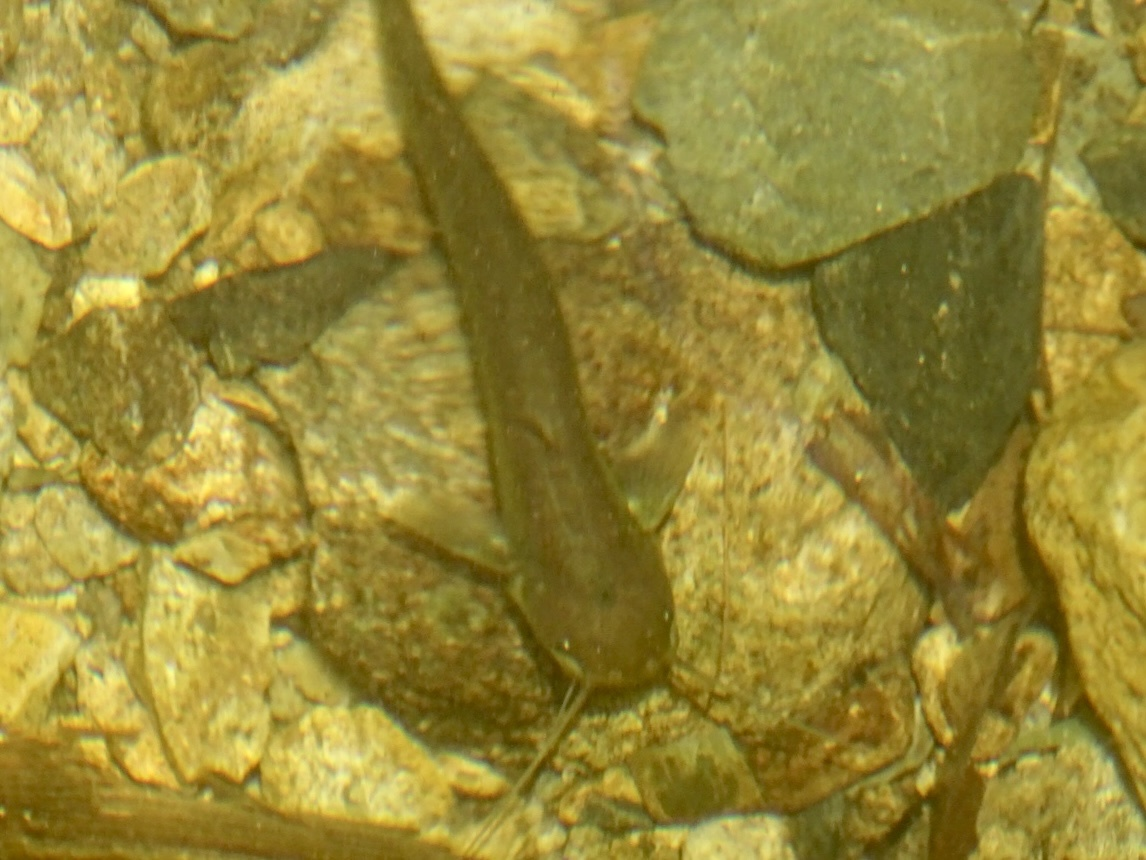

Conservation status
- Least Concern (IUCN 3.1)

Scientific classification
- Kingdom: Animalia
- Phylum: Chordata
- Class: Actinopterygii
- Order: Siluriformes
- Family: Siluridae
- Genus: Pterocryptis
- Species: P. anomala

Binomial name
- Pterocryptis anomala (Herre, 1934)

Synonyms
- Herklotsella anomala Herre, 1934; Parasilurus anomalus (Herre, 1934); Silurus anomalus (Herre, 1934)

= Pterocryptis anomala =

Species of catfish

Pterocryptis anomala is a species of catfish found in southeastern China, in the Min River and Pearl River drainages, and in the streams draining the Hong Kong region.

This species reaches a length of 25.0 cm (9.8 in).
