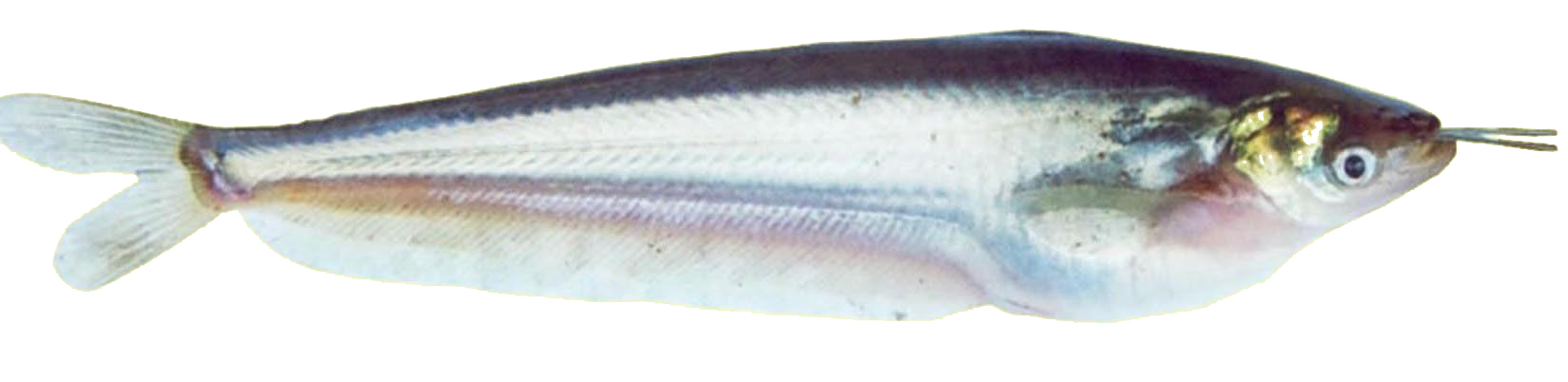
- Ompok bimaculatus

Scientific classification
- Kingdom: Animalia
- Phylum: Chordata
- Class: Actinopterygii
- Order: Siluriformes
- Family: Siluridae
- Genus: Ompok; Lacépède, 1803

Type species
- Ompok siluroides Lacépède, 1803

Synonyms
- Callichrous Hamilton, 1822; Pseudosilurus Bleeker, 1857; Silurodes Bleeker, 1857

= Ompok =

Genus of fishes

Ompok is a genus of fishes in the family Siluridae found in lakes and large rivers throughout South and Southeast Asia.

== Taxonomy ==
The genus is recognized to be paraphyletic. The species of Ompok have been grouped into species groups, such as the Ompok bimaculatus group (i.e. O. bimaculatus, O. malabaricus and O. miostoma), the O. eugeneiatus group (i.e. O. eugeneiatus and O. pinnatus), the O. hypophthalmus group (i.e. O. hypophthalmus, O. rhabdinurus and O. urbaini) and the O. leiacanthus group (O. fumidus, O. jaynei and O. leiacanthus). On the other hand, the monophyly of these species groups is not strong enough to reassign species to other genera.

The O. eugeneiatus group is likely to be more closely related to Kryptopterus than the other Ompok species. According to Ferraris O. eugeneiatus has been reclassified into Kryptopterus, however O. pinnatus has not.

== Species ==
There are currently 28 recognized species in this genus:

- Ompok argestes Sudasinghe & Meegaskumbura, 2016 (Wetzone butter catfish)
- Ompok bimaculatus (Bloch, 1794) (Butter catfish)
- Ompok binotatus H. H. Ng, 2002
- Ompok borneensis (Steindachner, 1901)
- Ompok brevirictus H. H. Ng & Hadiaty, 2009
- Ompok canio (F. Hamilton, 1822)
- Ompok ceylonensis (Günther, 1864) (Dryzone butter catfish)
- Ompok eugeneiatus (Vaillant, 1893) (Malay glass catfish)
- Ompok fumidus T. H. T. Tan & P. K. L. Ng, 1996
- Ompok goae (Haig, 1952)
- Ompok hypophthalmus (Bleeker, 1846)
- Ompok javanensis (Hardenberg, 1938)
- Ompok jaynei Fowler, 1905
- Ompok karunkodu H. H. Ng, 2013
- Ompok leiacanthus (Bleeker, 1853)
- Ompok malabaricus (Valenciennes, 1840) (Goan catfish)
- Ompok miostoma Vaillant, 1902
- Ompok pabda (F. Hamilton, 1822) (Pabdah catfish)
- Ompok pabo (F. Hamilton, 1822) (Pabo catfish)
- Ompok pinnatus H. H. Ng, 2003 (Long-fin glass catfish)
- Ompok platyrhynchus H. H. Ng & H. H. Tan, 2004
- Ompok pluriradiatus H. H. Ng, 2002
- Ompok rhadinurus H. H. Ng, 2003
- Ompok sabanus Inger & P. K. Chin, 1959
- Ompok siluroides Lacépède, 1803
- Ompok supernus H. H. Ng, 2008
- Ompok urbaini (P. W. Fang & Chaux, 1949)
- Ompok weberi (Hardenberg, 1936)
