= Pterocryptis verecunda =

Conservation status
- Near Threatened (IUCN 3.1)

Scientific classification
- Kingdom: Animalia
- Phylum: Chordata
- Class: Actinopterygii
- Order: Siluriformes
- Family: Siluridae
- Genus: Pterocryptis
- Species: P. verecunda

Binomial name
- Pterocryptis verecunda H. H. Ng & Freyhof, 2001

Species of catfish

Pterocryptis verecunda is a species of catfish found in Cat Ba Island in north-eastern Vietnam.

This species reaches a length of 13.2 cm (5.2 in).

== Etymology ==
The species epithet means shy.
