= Pterocryptis indica =

Conservation status
- Data Deficient (IUCN 3.1)

Scientific classification
- Kingdom: Animalia
- Phylum: Chordata
- Class: Actinopterygii
- Order: Siluriformes
- Family: Siluridae
- Genus: Pterocryptis
- Species: P. indica

Binomial name
- Pterocryptis indica (Datta, Barman & Jayaram, 1987)

Synonyms
- Kryptopterus indicus Datta, Barman & Jayaram, 1987; Silurus indicus (Datta, Barman & Jayaram, 1987); Pterocryptis indicus (Datta, Barman & Jayaram, 1987)

Species of catfish

Pterocryptis indica is a species of catfish found in the Namdapha River in Arunachal Pradesh, India.

This species reaches a length of 25.3 cm (10.0 in).

== Type locality ==
The type locality is listed as Hornbill Point, Namdapha River, Namdapha Wildlife Sanctuary, Arunachal Pradesh, India.
