= Pterocryptis berdmorei =

Conservation status
- Least Concern (IUCN 3.1)

Scientific classification
- Kingdom: Animalia
- Phylum: Chordata
- Class: Actinopterygii
- Order: Siluriformes
- Family: Siluridae
- Genus: Pterocryptis
- Species: P. berdmorei

Binomial name
- Pterocryptis berdmorei (Blyth, 1860)

Synonyms
- Silurichthys berdmorei Blyth, 1860; Silurus berdmorei (Blyth, 1860)

Species of catfish

Pterocryptis berdmorei is a species of catfish found in Asia, in Myanmar and India.

This species reaches a length of 21.4 cm (8.4 in).

== Etymology ==
The fish is named in honor of Major Hugh Thomas Berdmore (1811–1859), of the Madras Artillery. He was the Assistant to the Commissioner and in charge of the forests' office, it was he who collected or furnished the type specimen.
