= Pterocryptis inusitata =

Conservation status
- Endangered (IUCN 3.1)

Scientific classification
- Kingdom: Animalia
- Phylum: Chordata
- Class: Actinopterygii
- Order: Siluriformes
- Family: Siluridae
- Genus: Pterocryptis
- Species: P. inusitata

Binomial name
- Pterocryptis inusitata H. H. Ng, 1999

Species of catfish

Pterocryptis inusitata, is a species of catfish found in Asia, in the middle Nam Theun River drainage which is a part of the Mekong River drainage in Laos.

This species reaches a length of 19.7 cm (7.8 in).
