= Wallago hexanema =

Scientific classification
- Kingdom: Animalia
- Phylum: Chordata
- Class: Actinopterygii
- Order: Siluriformes
- Family: Siluridae
- Genus: Wallago
- Species: W. hexanema

Binomial name
- Wallago hexanema (Kner, 1866)

Species of fish

Wallago hexanema is a species of catfish in the family Siluridae (the sheatfishes), native to Asia.
