= Pterocryptis crenula =

Scientific classification
- Kingdom: Animalia
- Phylum: Chordata
- Class: Actinopterygii
- Order: Siluriformes
- Family: Siluridae
- Genus: Pterocryptis
- Species: P. crenula

Binomial name
- Pterocryptis crenula H. H. Ng & Freyhof, 2001

Species of catfish

Pterocryptis crenula is a species of catfish found in north-eastern Vietnam.

This species reaches a length of 12.5 cm (4.9 in).

== Etymology ==
The fish's name comes from the Latin for a small notch, referring to the relatively shallow notch between the confluent anal and caudal fins.
