= Ompok argestes =

Conservation status
- Vulnerable (IUCN 3.1)

Scientific classification
- Kingdom: Animalia
- Phylum: Chordata
- Class: Actinopterygii
- Order: Siluriformes
- Family: Siluridae
- Genus: Ompok
- Species: O. argestes

Binomial name
- Ompok argestes Sudasinghe & Meegaskumbura, 2016

Synonyms
- Ompok bimaculatus (not Bloch, 1794): Haig, 1952: 103 (in part); Deraniyagala, 1952: 51 (in part); Senanayake, 1980: 195 (in part); Pethiyagoda, 1991: 154 (in part); Ompok ceylonensis (not Günther, 1864): Kottelat & Lim, 1995

Species of fish

Ompok argestes, is a species of sheatfishes endemic to Sri Lanka.

== Description ==
The male reaches 14.7 cm in length and is a demersal species of fish. It has four dorsal soft rays and 56–63 anal soft rays with 48–52 vertebrae present. The body and head are mottled greyish brown, with a uniformly convex predorsal profile. There are two pairs of barbels and the mouth is terminal, with the lower jaw longer than the upper. The eyes are small and lack a free orbital margin. A hazy black blotch is present in the humeral region with scattered melanophores on the dorsal, pectoral and caudal fins. The anal fin has greyish-brown mottling, while the pelvic fin is hyaline.
