= Pterocryptis buccata =

Conservation status
- Data Deficient (IUCN 3.1)

Scientific classification
- Kingdom: Animalia
- Phylum: Chordata
- Class: Actinopterygii
- Order: Siluriformes
- Family: Siluridae
- Genus: Pterocryptis
- Species: P. buccata

Binomial name
- Pterocryptis buccata H. H. Ng & Kottelat, 1998

Species of catfish

Pterocryptis buccata, the cave sheatfish, is a species of catfish found in Asia, and presently known only from Amphoe Sai Yok in the Meklong basin in Kanchanaburi Province, western Thailand.

This species reaches a length of 14.7 cm (5.8 in).

== Type Locality ==
The type locality is listed as Mae Khlong basin, about 14°15'N, 99°04'E, Amphoe Sai Yok, Kanchanaburi Province, Thailand.
