= Hemisilurus heterorhynchus =

Scientific classification
- Kingdom: Animalia
- Phylum: Chordata
- Class: Actinopterygii
- Order: Siluriformes
- Family: Siluridae
- Genus: Hemisilurus
- Species: H. heterorhynchus

Binomial name
- Hemisilurus heterorhynchus Bleeker, 1853

Species of fish

Hemisilurus heterorhynchus is a species of sheatfish first described by Pieter Bleeker in 1853. Hemisilurus heterorhynchus is part of the genus Hemisilurus and the family Siluridae.
