= Pterocryptis taytayensis =

Conservation status
- Endangered (IUCN 3.1)

Scientific classification
- Kingdom: Animalia
- Phylum: Chordata
- Class: Actinopterygii
- Order: Siluriformes
- Family: Siluridae
- Genus: Pterocryptis
- Species: P. taytayensis

Binomial name
- Pterocryptis taytayensis (Herre, 1924)

Synonyms
- List: Hito taytayensis Herre, 1924; Hitoichthys taytayensis Herre, 1924; Ompok taytayensis (Herre, 1924); Ospatulus taytayensis Herre, 1924; Penesilurus palavanensis Herre, 1924; Penesilurus palawanensis Herre, 1924; Silurus palavanensis (Herre, 1924)

Species of catfish

Pterocryptis taytayensis is a species of catfish found in Palawan, Philippines.

This species reaches a length of 12.0 cm (4.7 in).

== Etymology ==
The fish is named in honor of a small freshwater creek near Taytay, Palawan, Philippines, which is where the type specimen was found.
