= Pterocryptis torrentis =

Scientific classification
- Domain: Eukaryota
- Kingdom: Animalia
- Phylum: Chordata
- Class: Actinopterygii
- Order: Siluriformes
- Family: Siluridae
- Genus: Pterocryptis
- Species: P. torrentis

Binomial name
- Pterocryptis torrentis (Kobayakawa, 1989)

Synonyms
- Silurus torrentis Kobayakawa, 1989

Species of catfish

Pterocryptis torrentis is a species of catfish found in Asia, from eastern Myanmar, Thailand and the Cardamon Mountains of southern Cambodia.

This species reaches a length of 20.0 cm (7.9 in).
