= Pterocryptis barakensis =

Conservation status
- Endangered (IUCN 3.1)

Scientific classification
- Kingdom: Animalia
- Phylum: Chordata
- Class: Actinopterygii
- Order: Siluriformes
- Family: Siluridae
- Genus: Pterocryptis
- Species: P. barakensis

Binomial name
- Pterocryptis barakensis Vishwanath & Nebeshwar Sharma, 2006

Species of catfish

Pterocryptis barakensis, is a species of catfish found in the Barak River of the Brahmaputra River basin in India.

== Type Locality ==
The type locality is listed as Barak River at Vanchengphai Village, Tamenlong District, Manipur, India.

== Etymology ==
The fish is named in honor of the Barak River in the Brahmaputra River basin in India, where the fish is endemic.
