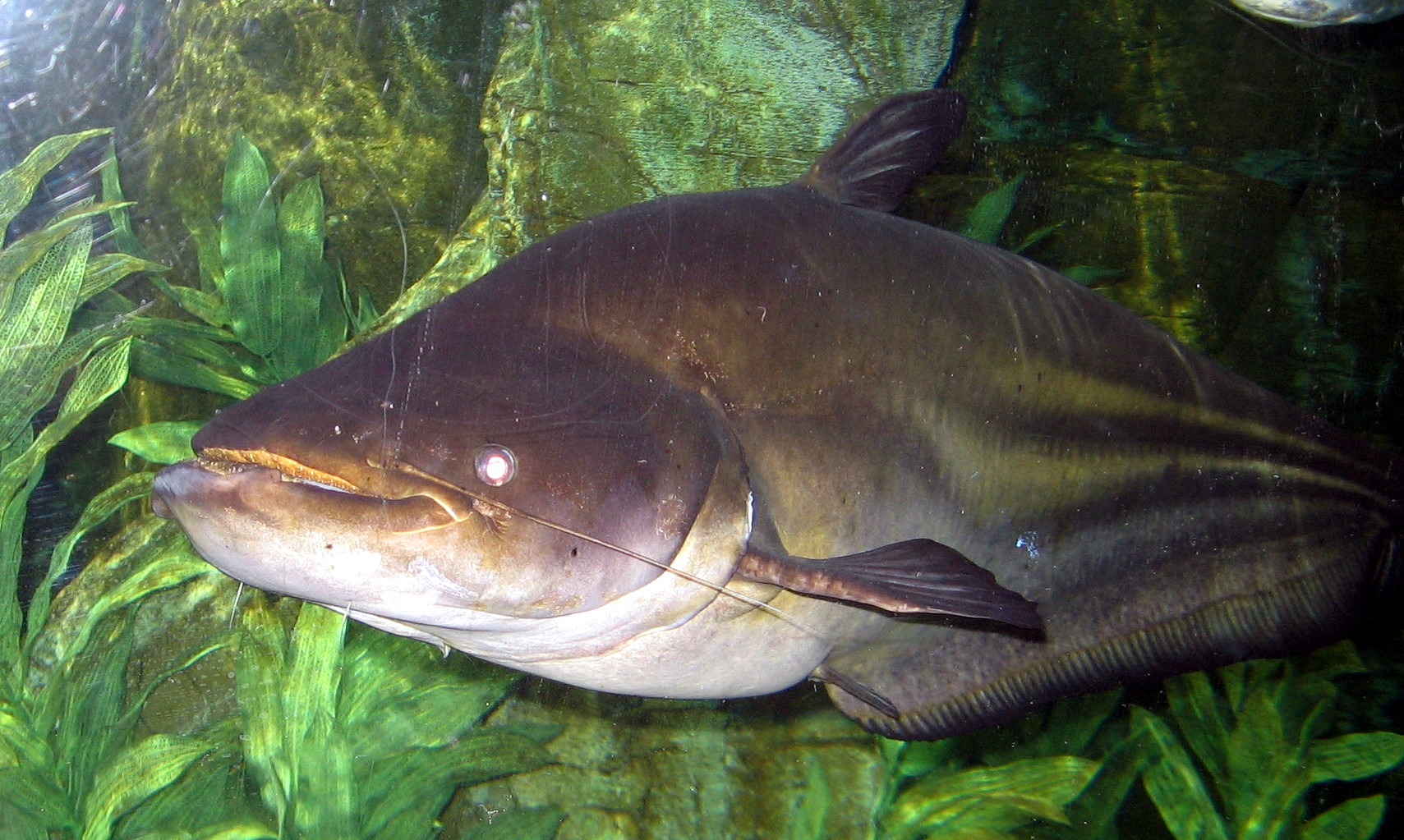

Conservation status
- Least Concern (IUCN 3.1)

Scientific classification
- Kingdom: Animalia
- Phylum: Chordata
- Class: Actinopterygii
- Division: Teleostei
- Order: Siluriformes
- Family: Siluridae
- Genus: Wallagonia
- Species: W. leerii

Binomial name
- Wallagonia leerii (Bleeker, 1851)

Synonyms
- Wallago leerii Bleeker, 1851; Wallago nebulosus Vaillant, 1902; Wallago tweediei Hora & Misra, 1941

= Wallagonia leerii =

Species of fish

Wallagonia leerii, also known as the Tapah and formerly the striped wallago catfish, is a species of catfish native to Southeast Asia. Its habitat ranges from the river drainages of Thailand through the Malayan peninsula to the islands of Sumatra and Borneo in Indonesia. It can grow up to 2 m (6 ft 7 in) in length and weigh up to 150 kg (330 lb). It has been used as food in Southeast Asia since ancient times. Overfishing for its prized meat has caused the population to significantly decrease. Furthermore, the breeding migration pattern of this fish is especially vulnerable to damming, which has also decreased the wild population significantly.

Until osteological research validated the genus Wallagonia in 2014, W. leerii was included in the genus Wallago.

The other two species of the genus Wallagonia, W. micropogon from the Mekong river basin and W. maculatus from the Kinabatangan river basin on Borneo, are currently considered as distinct species. There are, however, strong suspicions that these may in fact be subspecies of W. leerii, as the sole difference seems to lie in a slightly different coloration.

== Description ==
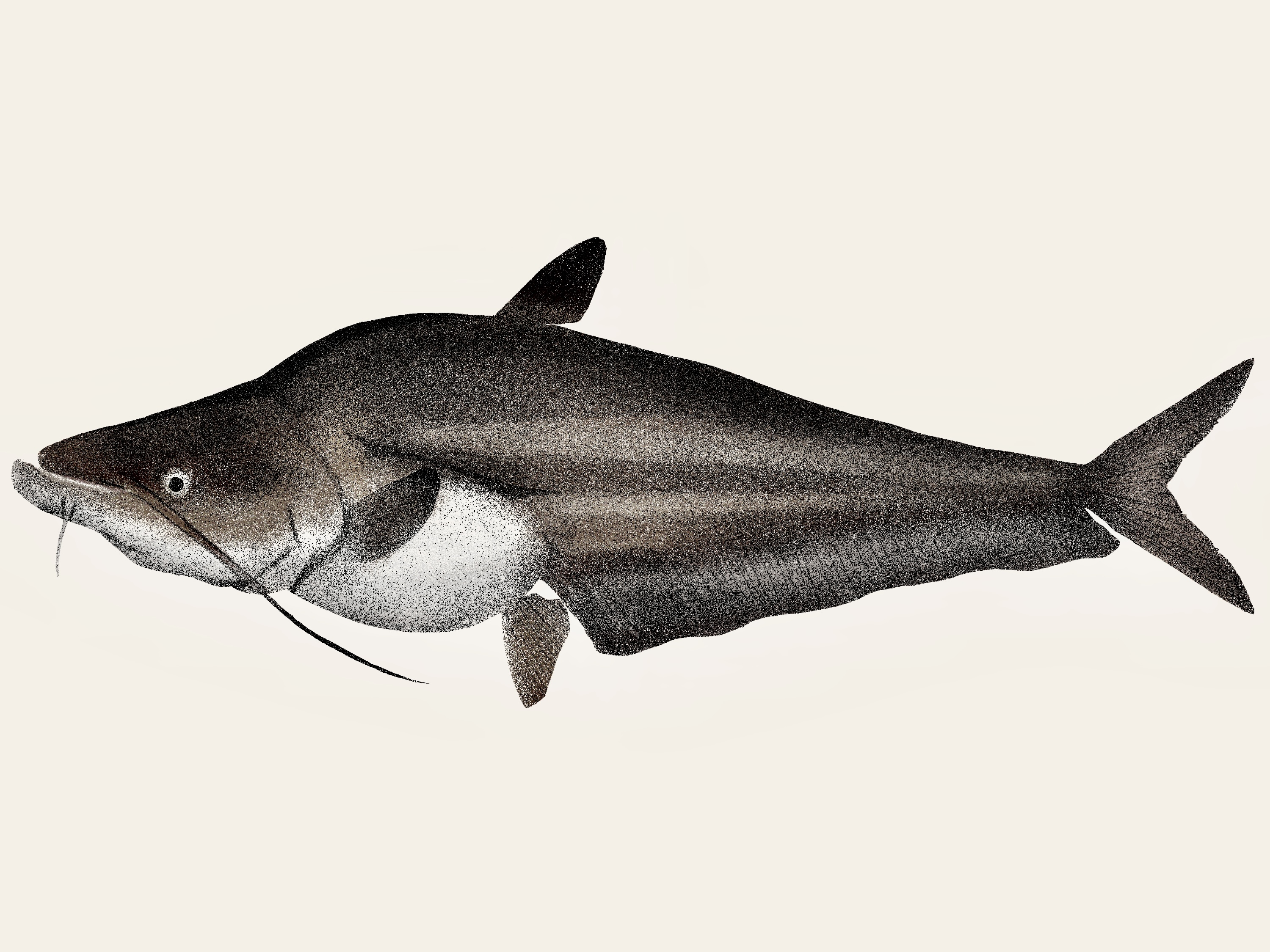
A tapah depicted in the Illustrated collection of fishes from Asia, Africa and Australia

The Tapah is a large fish, commonly attaining lengths of 150 centimetres and a mass of up to 86 kilograms. The size of this fish however can easily exceed the aforementioned lengths. It is the second-largest catfish in its family and is only outsized by the wels, giant pangasius and Mekong giant catfish. It has a short, rounded body and a long broad tail The anal fin of the fish is about as long as the tail itself and it ends in a forked caudal fin. The pelvic fins of the fish are small, and there are no dorsal spines on it. The Tapah possesses a noticeable hump, atop sits its dorsal fin, which is small and almost elliptical. The head of this fish is long, and remarkably wide with a huge lower jaw that extends beyond its maxilla. The mouth of the catfish is inlaid with several rows of sharp teeth that enable it to grip prey. It is a piscivore, primarily feeding on small fish which are snatched mid-swimming and consumed whole.

== Threats ==
The Tapah faces multitude threats, as it is vulnerable to destructive fishing, competition with invasive species, destruction of suitable habitat, and dam construction that impact its lifecycle.

Splitting of species within the complex may give doubts to the true abundance of the species, meaning it could be far more restricted than once thought.

== Mating ==
In July, adults migrate downstream to flooded grasslands to spawn. At night, the eggs are spawned near the surface.
