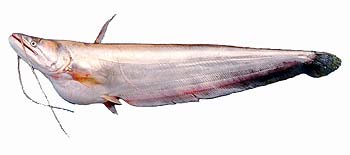

Conservation status
- Vulnerable (IUCN 3.1)

Scientific classification
- Kingdom: Animalia
- Phylum: Chordata
- Class: Actinopterygii
- Order: Siluriformes
- Family: Siluridae
- Genus: Wallago
- Species: W. attu

Binomial name
- Wallago attu Bloch & Schneider, 1801

Synonyms
- Silurus boalis Hamilton, 1822; Silurus wallagoo Valenciennes, 1840; Silurus muelleri Bleeker, 1846; Wallago russellii Bleeker, 1853

= Wallago attu =

Species of fish

Wallago attu, boal, or helicopter catfish, is a species of freshwater catfish of the family Siluridae, native to South and Southeast Asia. W. attu is found in large rivers and lakes in two geographically disconnected regions (disjunct distribution), with one population living over much of the Indian subcontinent and the other in parts of Southeast Asia. This species can reach a length up to 1.1 m (3 ft 7 in).

It shares parts of its native range with the externally similar, but much larger Wallagonia leerii, and is subsequently often confused for it. It can, however, be differentiated by its relatively long and narrower head, as well as its dorsal fin, which is high and sharp, opposed to that of W. leerii, which is lower and rounded. Additionally, the eyes of W. attu lie above the mouth of the fish, whilst they lie on the same level as the mouth in W. leerii.

This catfish is one of the fish species that has been used as food in Southeast Asia since ancient times. In Thailand, its meat is popularly used to make thot man (ทอดมัน, "Thai fish cakes"), similar to clown featherback (Chitala ornata).

== Confusion with other catfishes ==
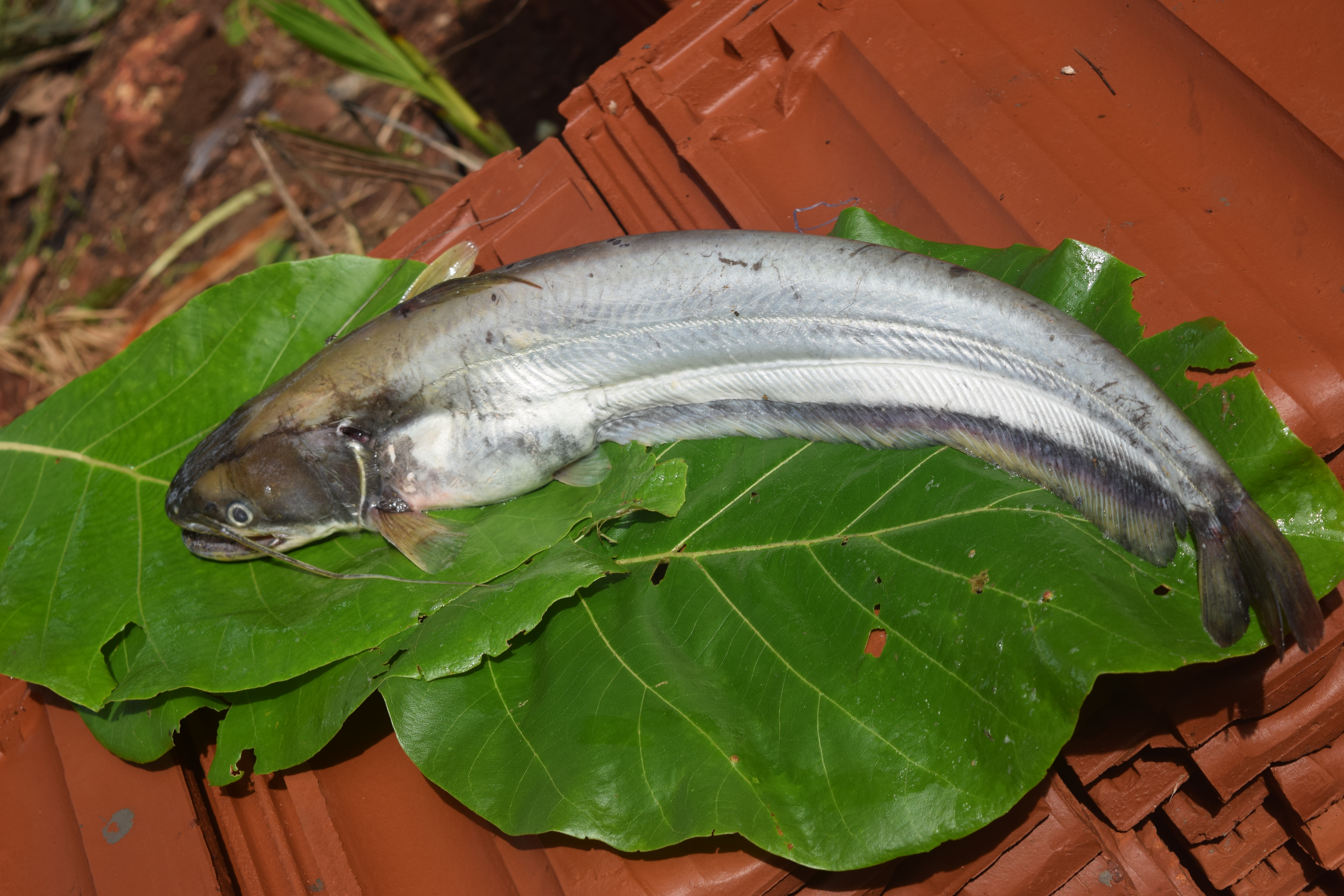
W. attu from Kerala, India

In many areas, Wallago attu is found alongside the externally similar and related catfish species Wallagonia leerii. In Indonesia and Malaysia, both species are referred to as ikan tapah, and in English, both are sometimes called helicopter catfish. Popular accounts such as media reports, claims by fishermen, or local folklore stories, and even scientific publications, often confuse the two or are altogether unaware of the difference. Therefore, claims exist that Wallago attu reaches lengths of more than 1.8 m (5 ft 11 in) and weights of more than 45 kg (99 lb). Biologists, however, are firm that it does not grow beyond a length of roughly 1 m (3 ft 3 in). The current rod-and-reel angling record for a Wallago attu caught in the wild and authenticated by the International Game Fish Association is a specimen of 18 kg (40 lb) from the Vajiralongkorn dam reservoir in Thailand, while some specialized recreational catch-and-release breeding ponds in the region claim to harbour specimens in the 20–30 kg (44–66 lb) range. It is thus assumed that reports about specimens even larger than that actually refer to Wallagonia leerii, which can grow to twice the length and several times the weight of Wallago attu.

== Distribution ==
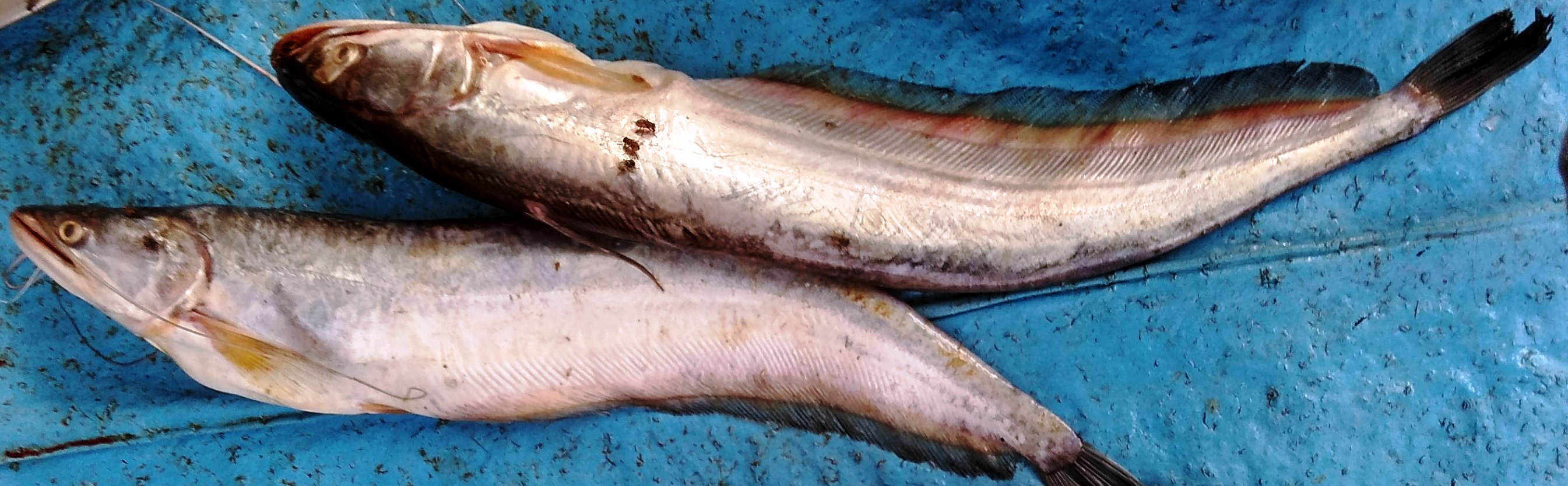
W. attu (Boal) from Kolkata, India

Wallago attu lives through large parts of South and Southeast Asia. Its range, however, seems discontiguous with a significant gap between the population inhabiting the Indian subcontinent and the one found across mainland and insular Southeast Asia. W. attu thus stands as an example for a species with a disjunct distribution.

On the Indian subcontinent, its range includes all the major rivers of India, Pakistan, Bhutan, Nepal and Bangladesh, such as the Ganges, Indus, Narmada, Godavari, Krishna and Mahanadi as well as the island of Sri Lanka. To the Northwest, its range extends beyond Pakistan into Iran and Afghanistan. To the East, it can be found as far as the Irrawaddy river basin in Myanmar.

The second population occurs in Southeast Asia and encompasses Thailand, Laos, Cambodia, Vietnam, Malaysia and Indonesia. Here it inhabits the Mae Klong, Chao Phraya and Mekong drainages, as well as those of the Malayan peninsula and the islands of Java and Sumatra. It is absent from Borneo, which ichthyologist Tyson R. Roberts considers "surprising".

The gap between the two populations is largely formed by the Salween and Tenasserim River drainages in Burma, where W. attu is not found. The reasons for this disjunct distribution are unknown.

== Biology and ecology ==
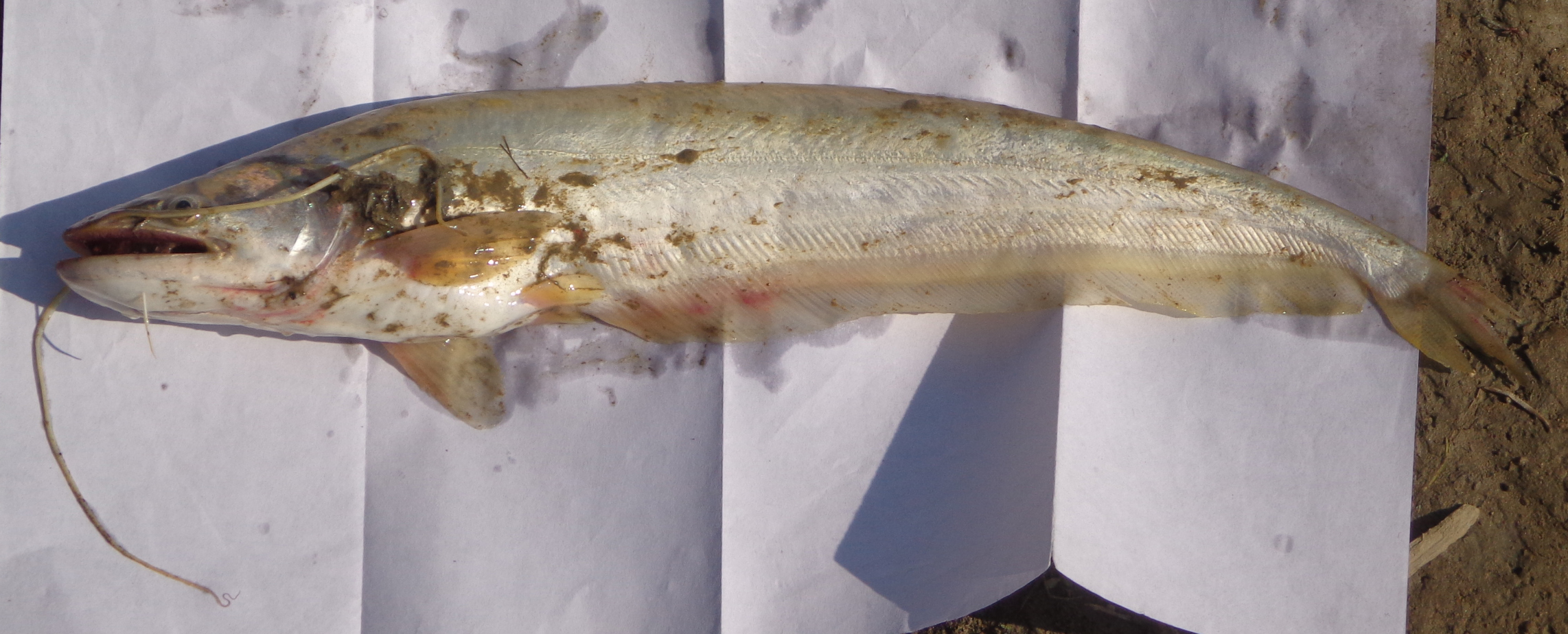
Younger individual resting upon a corrugated piece of paper

As a large, predatory fish, W. attu maintains a largely piscivorous diet. Gut content analysis performed on specimens from the Godavari river in India shows that about 90 to 95% of the consumed food consisted of animal matter. Among the prey fishes most commonly found in the stomachs of Godavari river W. attu are razorbelly minnows (Salmophasia phulo), ticto barbs (Pethia ticto) and perchlets (Chanda nama), all of which are small species that reach maximum lengths of about 10–12 cm (3.9–4.7 in).

== Possible species splitting ==
The vast and disjunct distribution of W. attu has led to the assumption that it might in fact not be a single species. A preliminary bone-by-bone comparison of W. attu specimens from Southeast Asia and South Asia showed significant differences in their skeletal structure. It is thus assumed that pending further research W. attu may possibly be split into two or more species within the genus Wallago in the future.

== Cultural references ==
According to Malaysian folklore, the descendant of a person called Tok Kaduk cannot eat and touch the fish because the legend says that a long time ago, Tok Kaduk caught this tapah. When he cut open its stomach, there was gold inside the fish so Tok Kaduk took the gold, stitched up the fish, and released it back into the river. From that time, if the descendant came in touch with the fish, their skin would become red and itchy until they went to Kg Tua, Lambor Kanan near Bota in Perak Tengah District of Perak, Malaysia to find the medicine. The medicine is the remaining gold from the fish, which has been kept to make the cure for the disease. Some say that the gold needs to be soaked in water and consumed by the patient as well as washing the areas that itch. Other stories have told that fish will devour the carcass of humans that have been buried in the water, and it will take the human's soul to the gods.

The Malaysian town of Tapah and different tropical storms named Tapah have been named after this fish (or the identically named Wallagonia leerii).

== See also ==
- Wallagonia leerii
