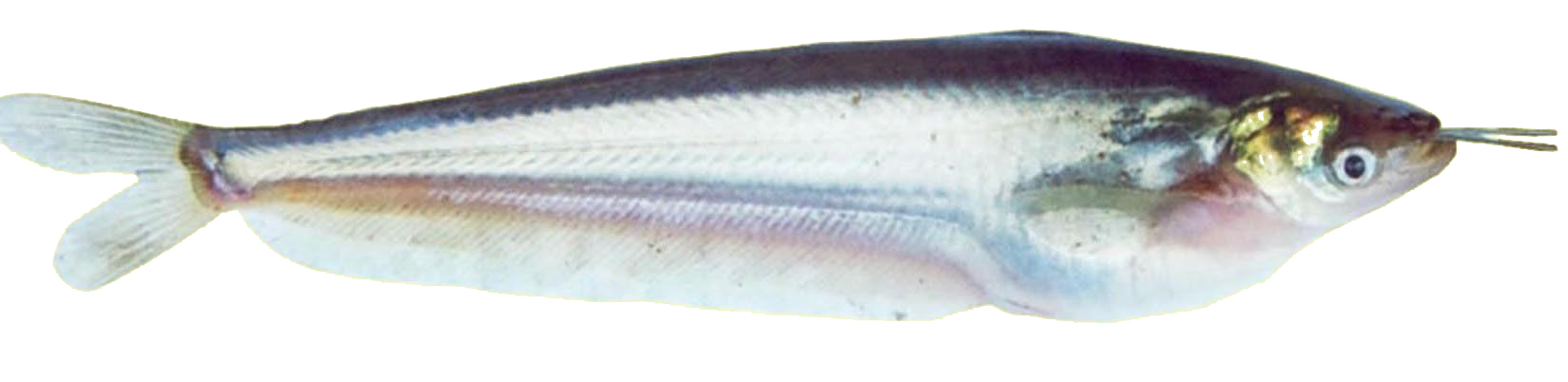

Conservation status
- Near Threatened (IUCN 3.1)

Scientific classification
- Kingdom: Animalia
- Phylum: Chordata
- Class: Actinopterygii
- Order: Siluriformes
- Family: Siluridae
- Genus: Ompok
- Species: O. bimaculatus

Binomial name
- Ompok bimaculatus (Bloch, 1794)

Synonyms
- Silurus bimaculatus Bloch, 1794; Callichrous bimaculatus (Bloch, 1794); Pseudosilurus bimaculatus (Bloch, 1794); Wallago bimaculatus (Bloch, 1794); Silurus chechra Hamilton, 1822; Callichrous chechra (Hamilton, 1822); Silurus duda Hamilton, 1822; Silurus affinis Swainson, 1839; Silurus nebulosus Swainson, 1839; Callichrous nebulosus (Swainson, 1839); Callichrus nebulosus (Swainson, 1839); Silurus microcephalus Valenciennes, 1840; Wallago microcephalus (Valenciennes, 1840); Silurus mysoricus Valenciennes, 1840; Pseudosilurus macropthalmos Blyth, 1860

= Ompok bimaculatus =

Butter catfish

Species of fish

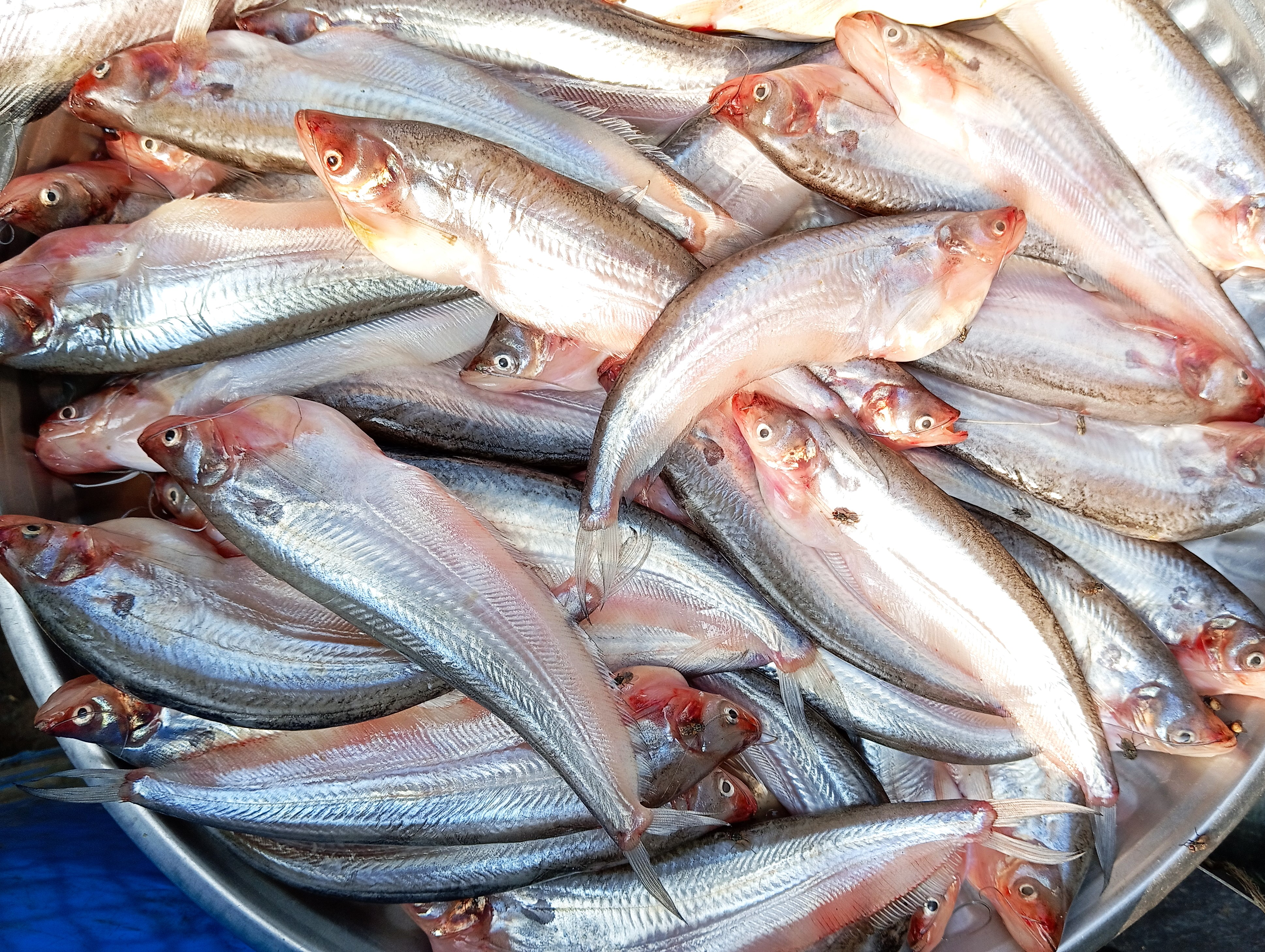
Butter catfish (Pabda), West Bengal, India

Ompok bimaculatus, known as butter catfish, is a species from the sheatfish family native to Asian countries such as Bangladesh, India, Pakistan, and Sri Lanka, but recently identified in Myanmar. It has also been identified in the Mekong Basin of Vietnam.

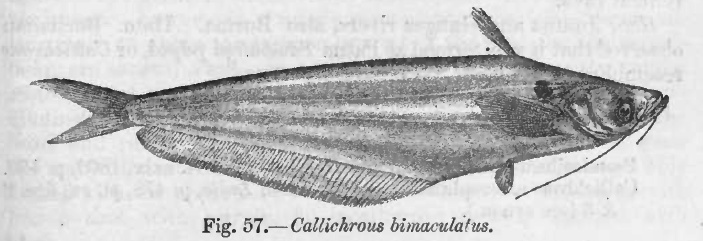
Ompok bimaculatus Day

Known in Thailand as pla cha-on (ปลาชะโอน), it is one of the very similar catfish species known in the markets as pla nuea on (วงศ์ปลาเนื้ออ่อน). It is valued for its delicate flesh and is also used for making high-quality fish balls. O. bimaculatus reaches a maximum length of 45 cm. The International Union for Conservation of Nature has classified this species as near threatened due to limited data suggesting overfishing and possibly widespread population declines, noting uncertain identities of populations classified as O. bimaculatus and concluding that there is an "urgent need for taxonomic, harvest and population studies".
