= Pterocryptis gangelica =

Conservation status
- Data Deficient (IUCN 3.1)

Scientific classification
- Kingdom: Animalia
- Phylum: Chordata
- Class: Actinopterygii
- Order: Siluriformes
- Family: Siluridae
- Genus: Pterocryptis
- Species: P. gangelica

Binomial name
- Pterocryptis gangelica Peters, 1861

Species of catfish

Pterocryptis gangelica is a species of catfish found in the Ganges River, where it occurs in India and Bangladesh.

This species reaches a length of 18.0 cm (7.1 in).

== Type Locality ==
The type locality is listed as the Ganges River, India.

== Etymology ==
The fish is named in honor of the Ganges River, India, the type locality for the fish.
