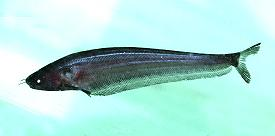

Scientific classification
- Kingdom: Animalia
- Phylum: Chordata
- Class: Actinopterygii
- Order: Siluriformes
- Family: Siluridae
- Genus: Hemisilurus
- Species: H. mekongensis

Binomial name
- Hemisilurus mekongensis Bornbusch & Lundberg, 1989

= Hemisilurus mekongensis =

Species of fish

Hemisilurus mekongensis is a species of sheatfish first described by Bornbusch and Lundberg in 1989. Hemisilurus mekongensis is part of the genus Hemisilurus and the family Siluridae.
