= Pterocryptis furnessi =

Conservation status
- Least Concern (IUCN 3.1)

Scientific classification
- Kingdom: Animalia
- Phylum: Chordata
- Class: Actinopterygii
- Order: Siluriformes
- Family: Siluridae
- Genus: Pterocryptis
- Species: P. furnessi

Binomial name
- Pterocryptis furnessi (Fowler, 1905)

Synonyms
- Apodoglanis furnessi Fowler, 1905; Silurus furnessi (Fowler, 1905); Silurus furness (Fowler, 1905) (misspelling)

Species of fish

Pterocryptis furnessi is a species of catfish in the family Siluridae (the sheatfishes) endemic to Malaysia, where it occurs in the Niah and Baram river basins in Sarawak, on the island of Borneo. Individuals of this species can reach a maximum length of 17.5 centimetres (6.9 in) TL.
