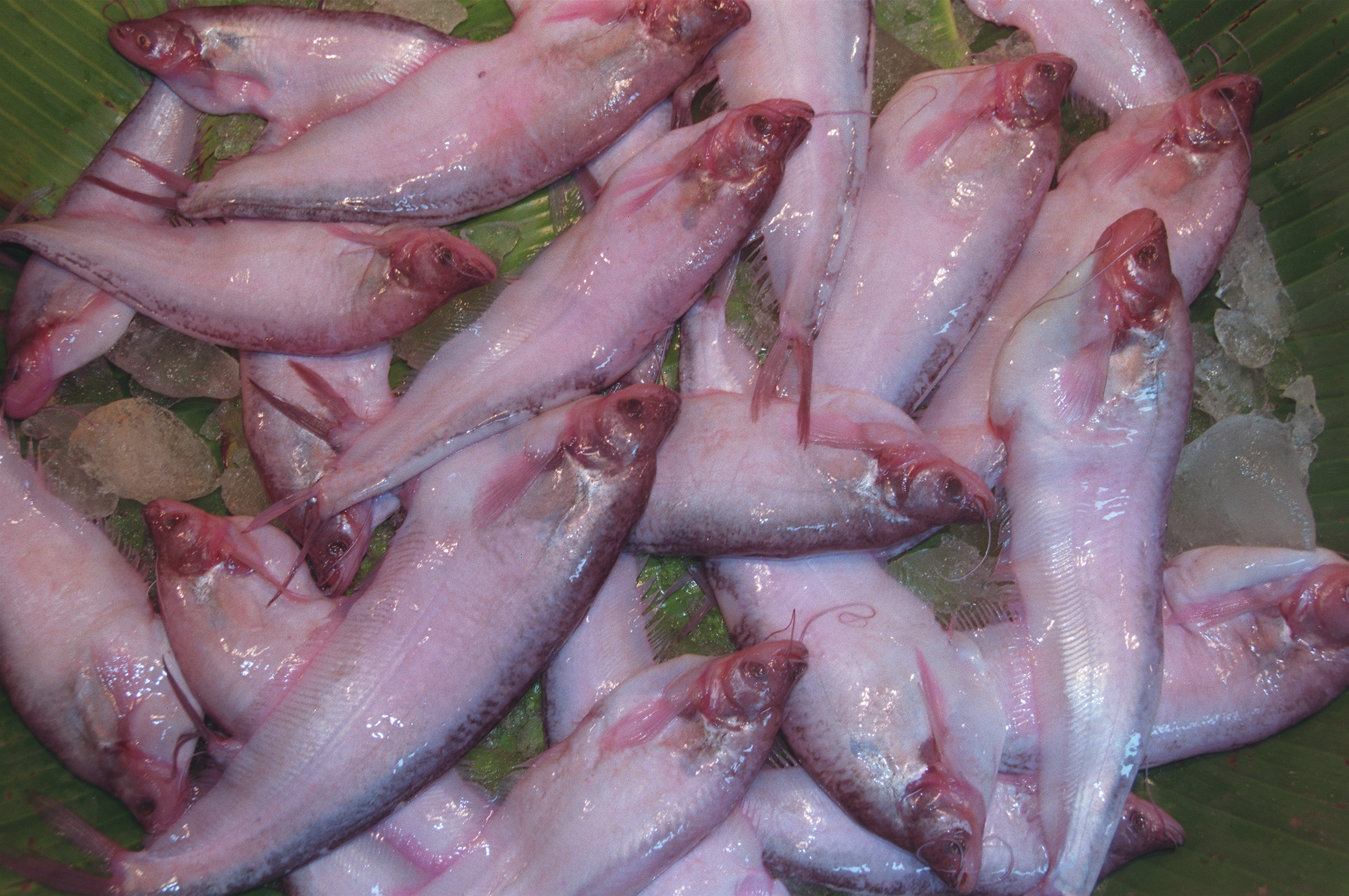

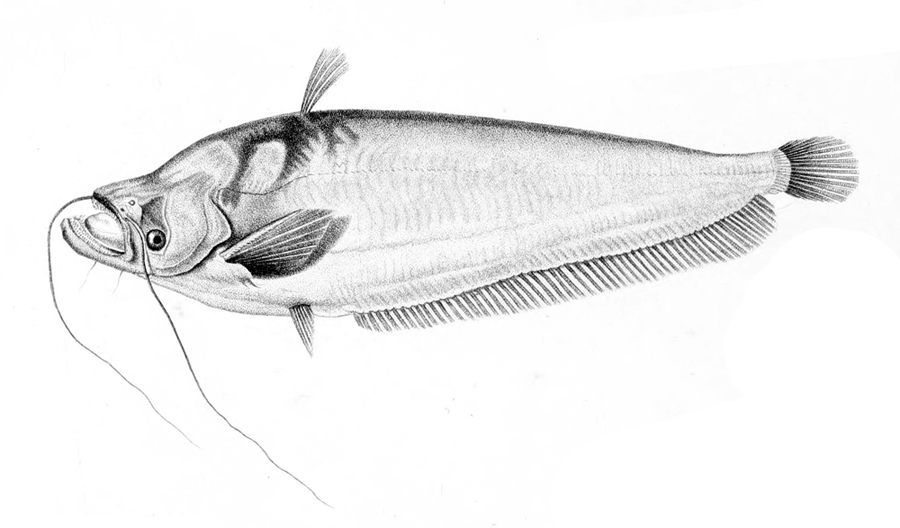

Conservation status
- Near Threatened (IUCN 3.1)

Scientific classification
- Kingdom: Animalia
- Phylum: Chordata
- Class: Actinopterygii
- Order: Siluriformes
- Family: Siluridae
- Genus: Ompok
- Species: O. pabda

Binomial name
- Ompok pabda (F. Hamilton, 1822)

Synonyms
- List: Silurus pabda; Hamilton, 1822: Callichrous pabda; (Hamilton, 1822): Wallago pabda; (Hamilton, 1822): Ompok pabde; (Hamilton, 1822)(lapsus): Ompok pabla; (Hamilton, 1822)(lapsus): Wallago anastomus; (Valenciennes, 1840)(lapsus): Silurus lamghur; Heckel, 1838: Silurichthys lamghur; (Heckel, 1838): Callichrous vittatus; (Swainson, 1839): Silurus anostomus; Valenciennes, 1840: Callichrous anastomus; (Valenciennes, 1840): Silurus anastomus; Valenciennes, 1840(lapsus): Cryptopterus latovittatus; Playfair, 1867: Callichrous egertonii; Day, 1872

= Ompok pabda =

Species of fish

Ompok pabda, also known as Pabdah catfish, is a freshwater species from the sheatfish family.

== Distribution and habitat ==
It is native to Asian countries such as Bangladesh, India, Myanmar, Pakistan and Afghanistan, where it inhabits streams, ponds and lakes of clear and muddy water.

== Description ==
It has an elongated body, with a large head, a wide mouth equipped with a pair of barbels facing downwards. Along the sides the body becomes increasingly compressed. The dorsal fin is small, with only 4 rays, as are the ventral ones. The anal fin is long: it starts from the belly and ends at the caudal peduncle. The caudal fin is small, with rounded edges. The livery is silver in colour, with brown, blue or pink spots; the belly is white and can reach a maximum of 30 centimetres (12 in).

== Reproduction ==
It lays over 40,000 eggs on average per female and breeding and egglaying occurs between May and August.

== Fisheries ==
In its places of origin it is fished for human consumption.
