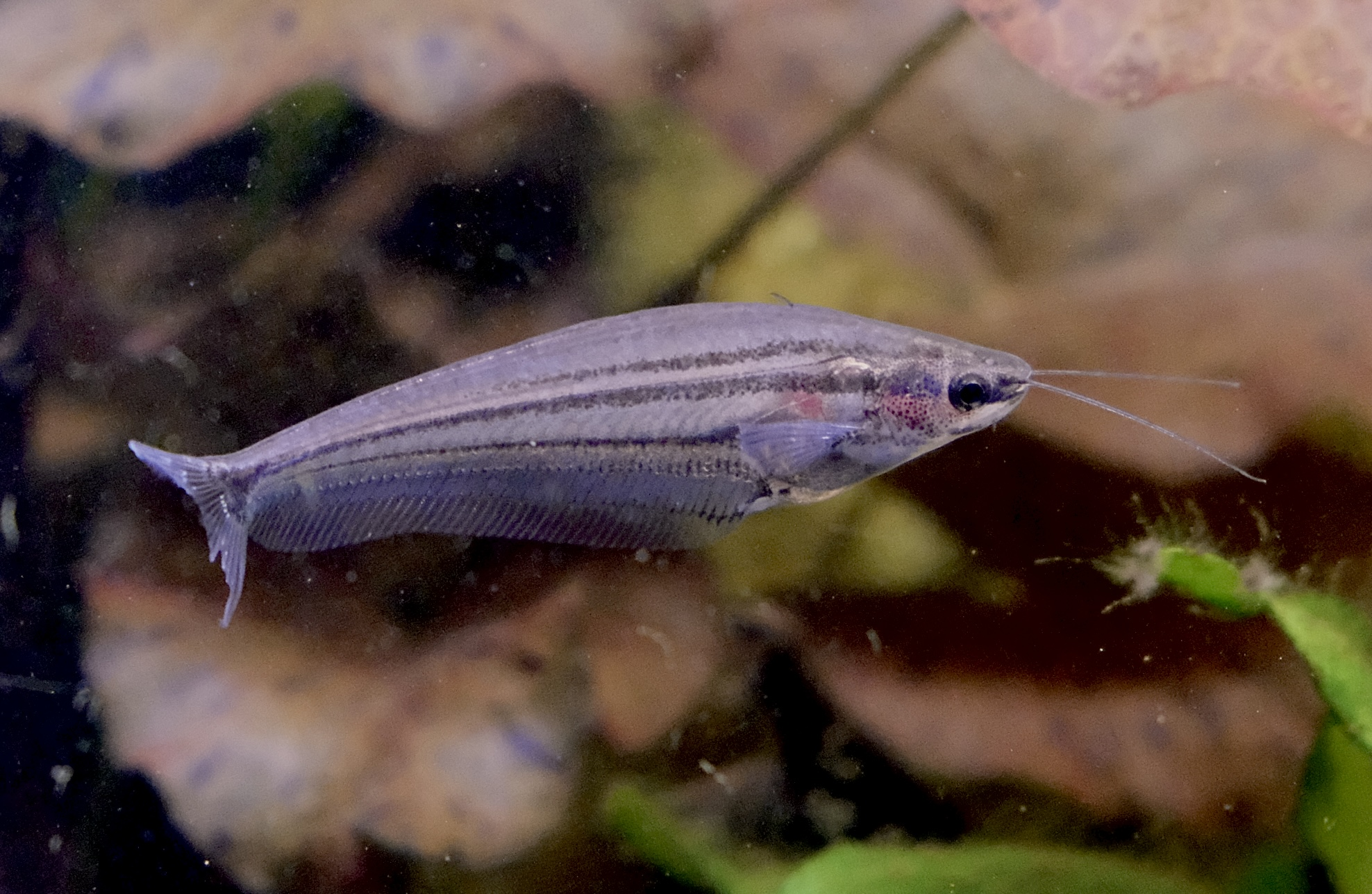

Conservation status
- Near Threatened (IUCN 3.1)

Scientific classification
- Kingdom: Animalia
- Phylum: Chordata
- Class: Actinopterygii
- Order: Siluriformes
- Family: Siluridae
- Genus: Kryptopterus
- Species: K. macrocephalus

Binomial name
- Kryptopterus macrocephalus Bleeker, 1858

= Striped glass catfish =

Species of fish

Kryptopterus macrocephalus, the striped glass catfish, is a species of sheatfish native to the Malay Peninsula, Sumatra and Borneo in Southeast Asia. This species, large for its genus, grows to a length of 9.7 centimetres (3.8 in) SL.

== Taxonomy ==
Kryptopterus macrocephalus is one of several freshwater fish endemic to Southeast Asia described by Pieter Bleeker in the 1850s when he was stationed in the Dutch East Indies, practicing his ichthyology alongside his military duties. The fish's name is derived from a combination of Kryptopterus (meaning "hidden wing", in reference to the reduced dorsal fin), and macrocephalus meaning "large head".

This species may go by a multitude of common names, such as the striped glass catfish, false glass catfish, the East indies glass catfish, and the Poor man's glass catfish.

== Description ==
This is a translucent freshwater catfish with two long barbels. The body is a smoky colour, with a transparent anal fin and belly, with organs visible. The fish is capable of changing its colour to some extent, taking on a mottled form even though it is not known why. When the light strikes the fish just right, it can create an iridescent rainbow color. During strong illness and after death, they turn milky white.

== Behaviour ==
The range of this is restricted due to its preference to acidic, blackwater rivers with a preference for peat. It prefers dark spots in fast-flowing waters and is omnivorous when young. Adults are predatory, hunting small prey such as fish fry and it is a social species being found in groups. It is collected from the wild for the aquarium trade, though it is uncommon and unlikely to impact its status.

== Status ==
The striped glass catfish is primarily threatened by habitat loss. The IUCN projected that peat-filled habitats may decline by 50%. Though it may readily acclimate to the average aquarium, its habitat preferences are often overlooked and it does not breed.
