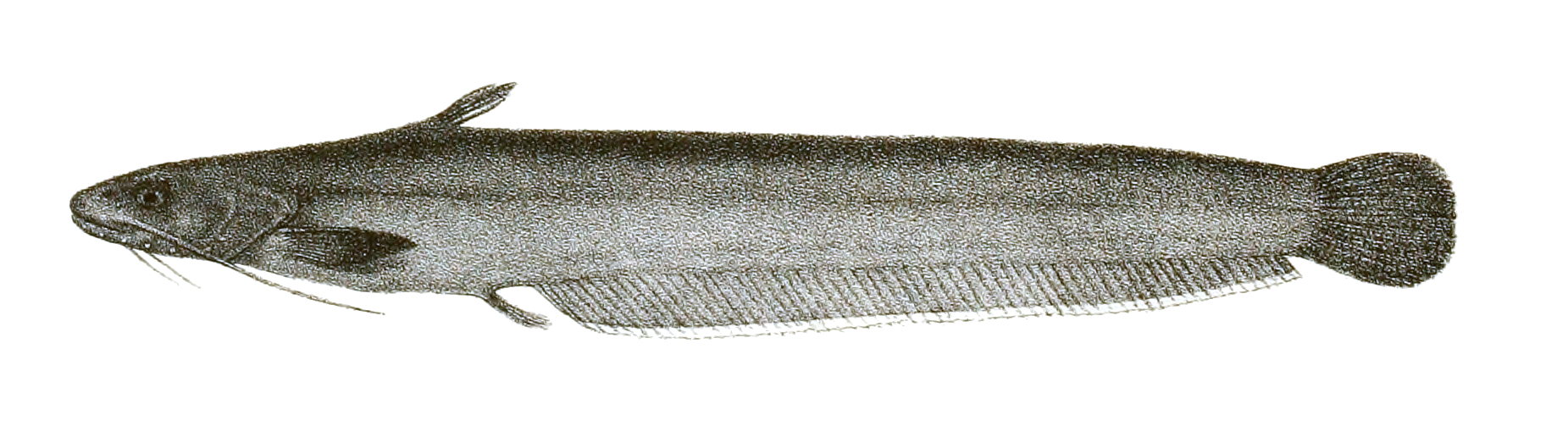

Conservation status
- Endangered (IUCN 3.1)

Scientific classification
- Kingdom: Animalia
- Phylum: Chordata
- Class: Actinopterygii
- Order: Siluriformes
- Family: Siluridae
- Genus: Pterocryptis
- Species: P. wynaadensis

Binomial name
- Pterocryptis wynaadensis (Day, 1873)

Synonyms
- Silurus wynaadensis Day, 1873; Silurus berdmorei wynaadensis Day, 1873; Silurus cochinchinensis wynaadensis Day, 1873

= Pterocryptis wynaadensis =

Malabar Silurus

Species of catfish

Pterocryptis wynaadensis, also known as Malabar Silurus, is a species of catfish found in Asia in the Cauvery drainage in Kerala and Thungabadhra drainage in Karnataka, India. This species reaches a length of 30.0 cm (11.8 in).

== Type Locality ==
The type locality is listed as Wynaad, India, elevation 3000 feet.

== Etymology ==
The fish is named in honor of Wynaad, where the type specimen was discovered.
