= Ceratoglanis =

Scientific classification
- Kingdom: Animalia
- Phylum: Chordata
- Class: Actinopterygii
- Order: Siluriformes
- Family: Siluridae
- Genus: Ceratoglanis; Myers, 1938

Type species
- Hemisilurus scleronema Bleeker, 1862

Genus of fishes

Ceratoglanis is a genus of sheatfishes native to Asia.

== Species ==
There are currently two recognized species in this genus:

- Ceratoglanis pachynema Ng, 1999 (Club-barbel sheatfish)
- Ceratoglanis scleronema (Bleeker, 1862)

== Distribution & Description ==
C. pachynemus originates from the Chao Phraya and Mekong River basins. C. scleronemus occurs in the Pahang River basin of peninsular Malaysia, the Baram, Barito, Kapuas, and Rejang River basins of Borneo, Citarum River basin of Java, and the Batang Hari and Siak River basins of Sumatra.

C. pachynemus grows to 28.0 centimetres (11.0 in) SL. It inhabits mainstream rivers. It is carnivorous, feeding on insects and benthic fauna.

C. scleronemus grows to 44.0 cm (17.3 in) SL. In the Kapuas Lakes area in Kalimantan Barat, Indonesia, fishermen reported that this species inhabits rivers and major streams with moderate to fast current. It appears to be predatory in nature, feeding on aquatic invertebrates and fish.
