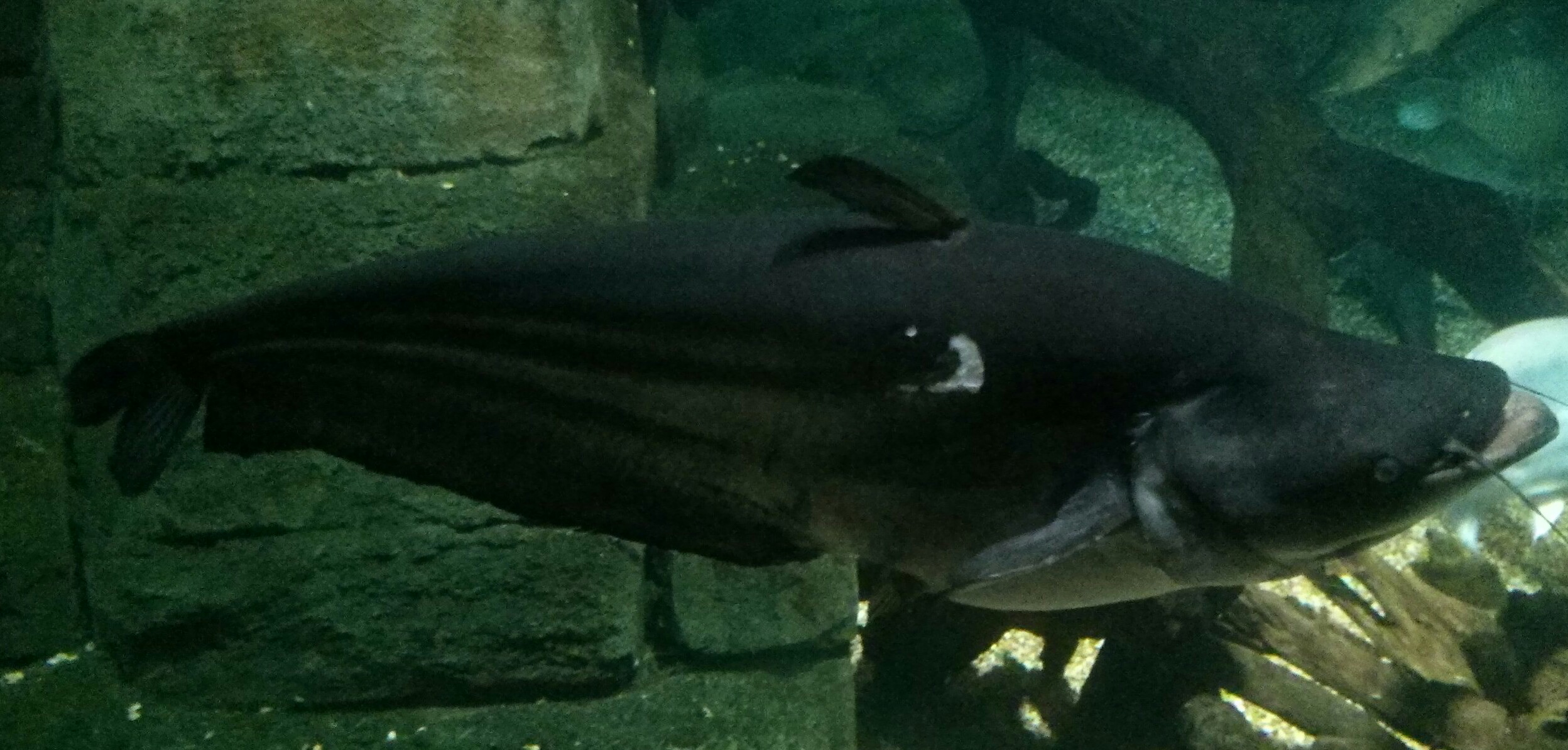
- At Aqua Toto Gifu, Japan

Conservation status
- Data Deficient (IUCN 3.1)

Scientific classification
- Kingdom: Animalia
- Phylum: Chordata
- Class: Actinopterygii
- Order: Siluriformes
- Family: Siluridae
- Genus: Wallagonia
- Species: W. micropogon

Binomial name
- Wallagonia micropogon (Ng, 2004)

Synonyms
- Wallago micropogon Ng, 2004

= Wallagonia micropogon =

Species of fish

Wallagonia micropogon is a species of catfish in the genus Wallagonia. This species was recently discovered and is found in the Mekong River drainage area between southern Vietnam and northern Laos as well as Chao Phraya River in Thailand. It is a freshwater fish.

Until osteological research validated the genus Wallagonia in 2014, W. micropogon was included in the genus Wallago.
