= Tropical Storm Vamei =

Pacific and North Indian tropical cyclone in 2001

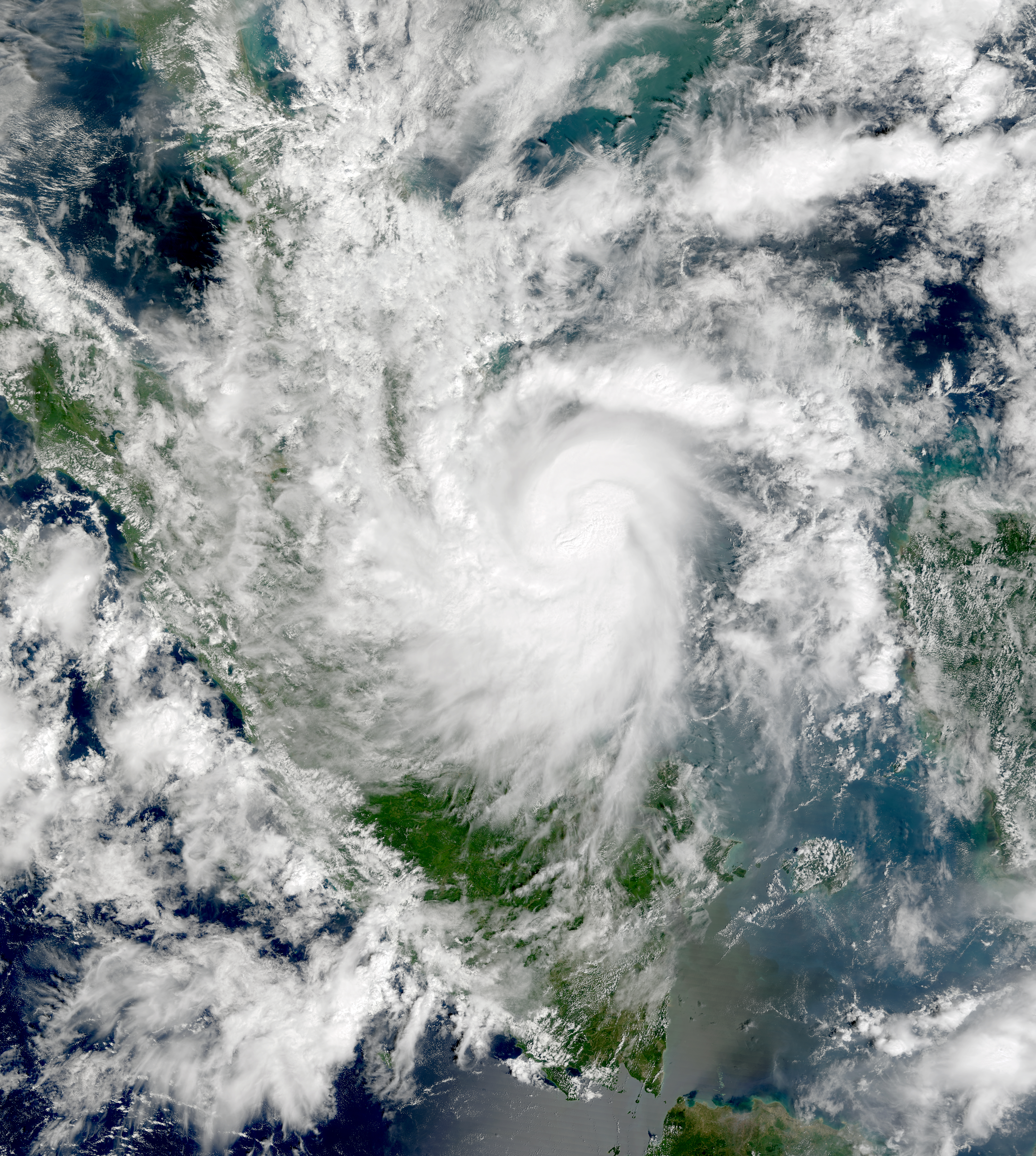
- Tropical Storm Vamei near landfall in Malaysia on 27 December

Meteorological history
- Formed: 26 December 2001
- Dissipated: 28 December 2001 (1 January 2002 per JTWC)

Tropical storm
- 10-minute sustained (JMA)
- Highest winds: 85 km/h (50 mph)
- Lowest pressure: 1006 hPa (mbar); 29.71 inHg

Category 1-equivalent typhoon
- 1-minute sustained (SSHWS/JTWC)
- Highest winds: 120 km/h (75 mph)
- Lowest pressure: 976 hPa (mbar); 28.82 inHg

Overall effects
- Fatalities: 5 direct
- Damage: $3.58 million (2001 USD)
- Areas affected: Singapore, Malaysia, Indonesia
- IBTrACS
- Part of the 2001 Pacific typhoon season

Tropical Storm Vamei, (Note: The name Vamei (Cantonese: 畫眉, [waː˨ mei˧˥]) was contributed by Macau and refers to the Chinese hwamei (Garrulax canorus) in Cantonese.) was an exceptionally rare tropical cyclone that formed at about 85 nautical miles (100 mi; 160 km) from the equator—closer than any other tropical cyclone on record. The last storm of the 2001 Pacific typhoon season, Vamei developed on 26 December at 1.4° N in the South China Sea. It strengthened quickly and made landfall along extreme southeastern Peninsular Malaysia. Vamei rapidly weakened into a remnant low over Sumatra on 28 December, and the remnants eventually re-organized in the North Indian Ocean. Afterward, the storm encountered strong wind shear once again, and dissipated on 1 January 2002.

Though Vamei was officially designated as a tropical storm, its intensity is disputed; some agencies classify it as a typhoon, based on sustained winds of 120 km/h (75 mph) and the appearance of an eye. The storm brought flooding and landslides to eastern Peninsular Malaysia, causing $3.58 million in damage (2001 USD, $6.51 million 2026 USD) and five deaths.

== Meteorological history ==
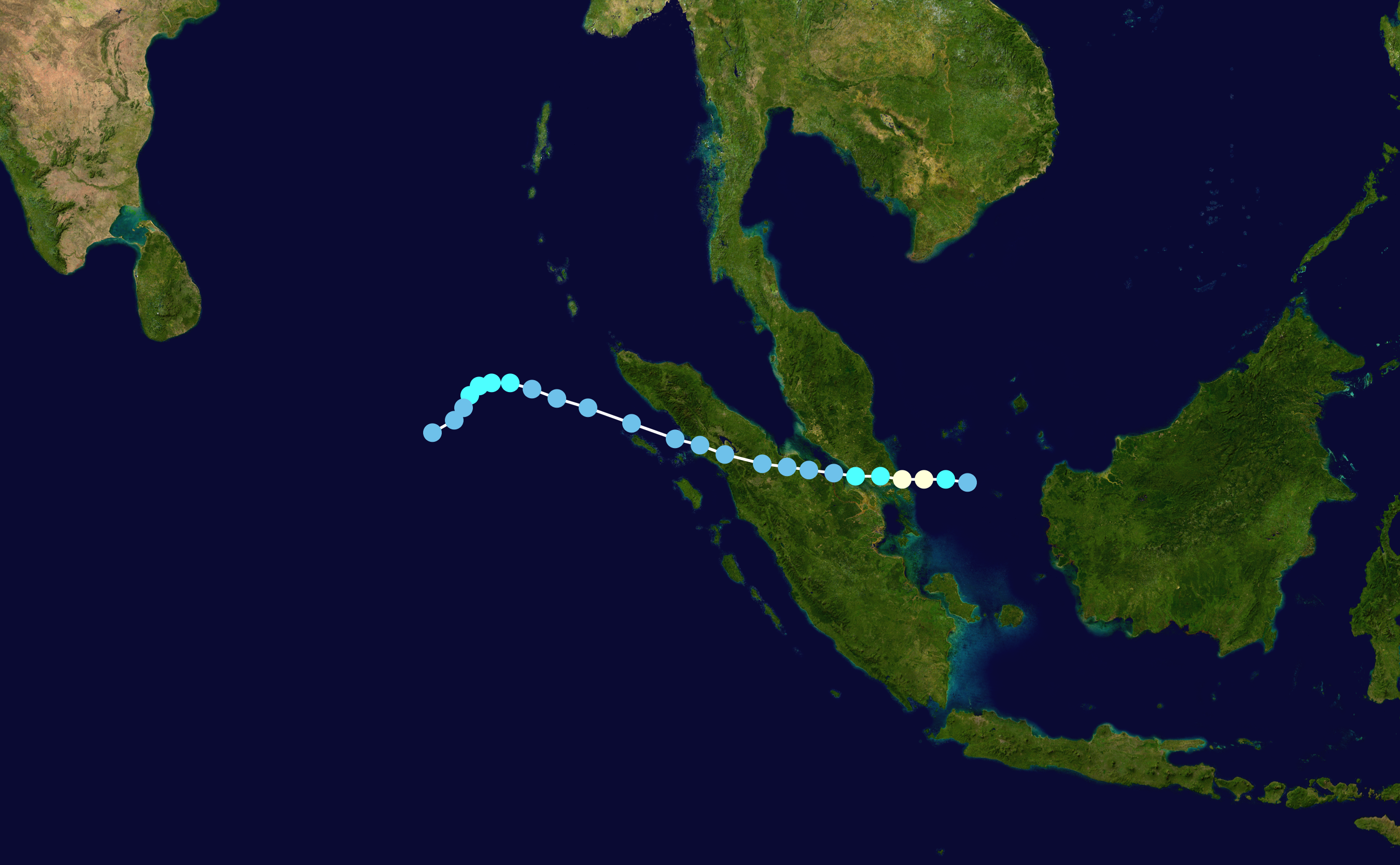
Map plotting the storm's track and intensity, according to the Saffir–Simpson scale Map key Saffir–Simpson scale Tropical depression (≤38 mph, ≤62 km/h) Tropical storm (39–73 mph, 63–118 km/h) Category 1 (74–95 mph, 119–153 km/h) Category 2 (96–110 mph, 154–177 km/h) Category 3 (111–129 mph, 178–208 km/h) Category 4 (130–156 mph, 209–251 km/h) Category 5 (≥157 mph, ≥252 km/h) Unknown Storm type Tropical cyclone Subtropical cyclone Extratropical cyclone, remnant low, tropical disturbance, or monsoon depression

On 19 December, a small low-level circulation was located along the northwest coastline of Borneo; at the same time a plume of cold air progressed southward through the South China Sea on the southeastern periphery of a ridge over the Far East. The vortex drifted southwestward, reaching open water by 21 December. The northerly air surge was deflected after interacting with the circulation, and at the same time a portion of the air surge crossed the equator. The southerly flow turned eastward, then northward, and in combination with the northerly flow it wrapped into the vortex, resulting in rapid development of the low-level circulation, just a short distance north of the equator. By 25 December, an area of scattered convection persisted about 370 km (230 mi) east of Singapore within an area of low wind shear, in association with the low-level circulation. Continuing slowly westward, the convection deepened and organized further, and at 12:00 UTC on 26 December the disturbance developed into a tropical depression about 230 km (140 mi) east of Singapore, or 156 km (97 mi) north of the equator. This was the first recorded occurrence of a tropical cyclone near the equator.

The depression strengthened further and officially attained tropical storm status at 00:00 UTC on 27 December, based on the analysis by the Japan Meteorological Agency (JMA), though the Joint Typhoon Warning Center (JTWC) unofficially classified it as a tropical storm six hours prior. Shortly thereafter, an eye with a 39 km (24 mi) diameter became apparent on satellite imagery, along with rainbands extending southward to the opposite side of the equator. At 06:00 UTC, the JMA first classified the system as Tropical Storm Vamei, about 65 km (40 mi) northeast of Singapore, and the agency estimated the storm attained peak winds of 85 km/h (55 mph) at the same time. However, the JTWC upgraded Vamei to typhoon status with peak winds of 120 km/h (75 mph), (Note: The JTWC operationally assessed the storm's peak winds to have been 140 km/h (85 mph).) based on a United States Navy ship report from within the eye; a second ship reported wind gusts of 195 km/h (120 mph) in the southern portion of the eyewall. The storm was small and compact, with gales extending about 45 km (28 mi) from its center. At about 0830 UTC on 27 December, Vamei made landfall approximately 60 km (37 mi) northeast of Singapore, in the southeastern portion of the Malaysian state of Johor. Initially, the Malaysian Meteorological Department (MetMalaysia) classified the cyclone as a tropical storm, though it was later re-assessed as a typhoon at landfall.

Vamei weakened quickly as it crossed the extreme southern portion of the Malay Peninsula, and late on 27 December, the JMA downgraded it to tropical depression status before the cyclone emerged into the Straits of Malacca. The JTWC initially maintained it as a minimal tropical storm, though the agency downgraded the storm to depression status as the storm's center again approached land. Early on 28 December, Vamei moved ashore on northeastern Sumatra, and at 06:00 UTC, the JMA classified the storm as dissipated. However, convection persisted near the circulation over land, believed to have been caused by the process known as upper-level diffluence. On 29 December, what was originally believed to be a separate system reached the southeastern Bay of Bengal. In a post-season re-evaluation, the JTWC classified the system as a continuation of Vamei, based on analysis of satellite imagery that indicated the circulation of Vamei crossed Sumatra without dissipating. Convection re-developed, and late on 30 December, the JTWC classified the cyclone as a tropical storm about 390 km (240 mi) west-southwest of the northwestern tip of Sumatra; initially, due to being treated as a separate system, it was classified as Tropical Cyclone 05B. Vamei quickly developed good outflow and organization, though increased wind shear on 31 December rapidly weakened the storm; by late that day, the center was exposed, and Vamei quickly dissipated on 1 January 2002.

=== Unusual formation ===
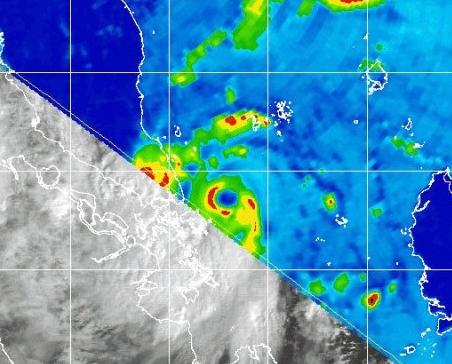
TRMM image of Vamei near landfall

Vamei formed and reached tropical storm strength at 1.4° N, only 84 nautical miles (156 km; 97 mi) from the equator. This broke the previous record of Typhoon Sarah in the 1956 Pacific typhoon season, which reached tropical storm strength at 2.2° N. Due to a lack of Coriolis effect near the equator, the formation of Vamei was previously considered impossible. However, a study by the Naval Postgraduate School indicated that the probability for a similar equatorial development was at least once every four centuries.

Vamei developed in a vortex that appears every winter along the northwest coast of Borneo and is maintained by the interaction between monsoonal winds and the local topography. Often, the vortex remains near the coastline, and in an analysis of 51 winters, only six reported the vortex as being over the equatorial waters for four days or more. As the area in the South China Sea between Borneo and Singapore is only 665 km (413 mi) wide, a vortex needs to move slowly to develop. A persistent northerly wind surge for more than five days, which is needed to enhance the vortex, is present, on average, nine days each winter. The probability for a pre-existing tropical disturbance to develop into a tropical cyclone is between 10 and 30 percent. Thus, the conditions which resulted in the formation of Vamei are believed to occur once every 100–400 years.

== Preparations and impact ==
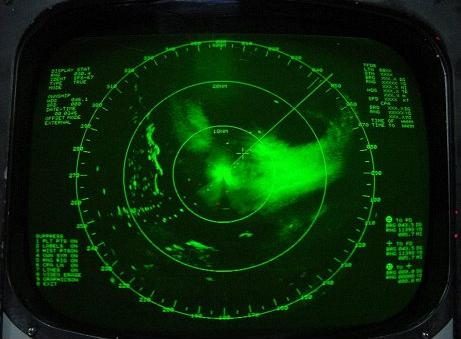
Radar image of Vamei from USS Carl Vinson (CVN-70)

Four days prior to Vamei moving ashore, the Malaysian Meteorological Department (MetMalaysia) issued storm advisories for potentially affected areas. Subsequently, the agency issued warnings for heavy rainfall, high winds, and rough seas. However, few citizens knew of the passage of the rare storm.

Offshore of Malaysia, two U.S. Navy ships in Vamei's eyewall were damaged by strong winds. Upon moving ashore, the storm brought storm surge damage to portions of southeastern Peninsular Malaysia. Vamei brought strong winds and heavy rainfall to portions of Melaka, Negeri Sembilan, and Selangor as well as to Johor, where rainfall reached over 200 mm (7.9 in) in Senai. Additionally, monsoonal moisture, influenced by the storm, produced moderate to heavy precipitation across various regions of peninsular Malaysia. The passage of the cyclone resulted in flooding and mudslides, which forced the evacuation of more than 13,195 people in Johor and Pahang states into 69 shelters. Along Gunung Pulai, the rainfall caused a landslide which destroyed four houses and killed five people. River flooding was also reported, as a result of the precipitation from Vamei as well as previous rainfall. Damage from the flooding was estimated at RM13.7 million (2001 MYR, $3.58 million 2001 USD). About 40 percent of the damage occurred to crops at a farm in Kota Tinggi. Moderate damage to transportation, education, and health-care facilities was also reported. The Malaysian government provided affected families up to RM5,000 (2001 MYR, $1,000 2001 USD) in assistance for food, clothing, and repairs. Vamei also brought heavy rainfall to Singapore, which caused air traffic disruptions at the Singapore Changi Airport. The passage of the cyclone resulted in many downed trees.

== Retirement ==
In 2004, the name Vamei was retired and replaced with Peipah, becoming the first retired name since the Japan Meteorological Agency began naming Pacific typhoons in 2000.

== See also ==
- Cyclone Senyar
- Cyclone Agni
- List of tropical cyclones near the Equator
- List of retired Pacific typhoon names
