= Pinniwallago kanpurensis =

Scientific classification
- Kingdom: Animalia
- Phylum: Chordata
- Class: Actinopterygii
- Division: Teleostei
- Order: Siluriformes
- Family: Siluridae
- Genus: Pinniwallago; Gupta, Jayaram & Hajela, 1981
- Species: P. kanpurensis

Binomial name
- Pinniwallago kanpurensis Gupta, Jayaram & Hajela, 1981

Species of fish

Pinniwallago kanpurensis is the only species in the nominal genus Pinniwallago of the catfish (order Siluriformes) family Siluridae. Pinniwallago is very similar in appearance to another silurid genus Wallago but is readily distinguished by the presence of a second dorsal fin. No other members of Siluridae have a second dorsal fin or adipose fin. This species is known only from Uttar Pradesh, India. It reaches a length of about 50 centimetres (20 in). A morphological examination of Pinniwallago kanpurensis specimens revealed irregularities in the internal supporting structures of the second dorsal fin. This study concluded that these specimens were, in fact, all aberrant specimens of Wallago attu, making P. kanpurensis a junior synonym of that species.
