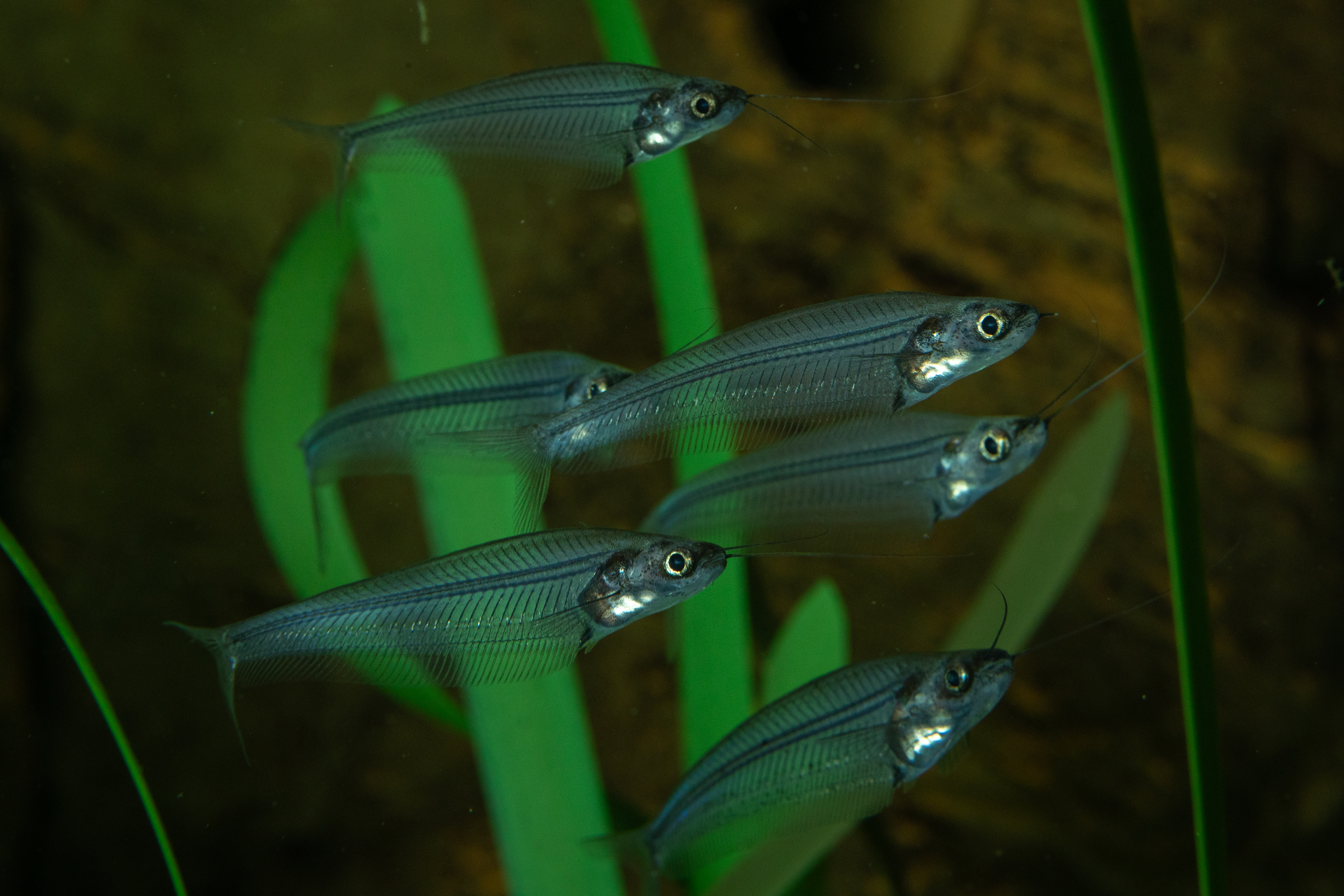

Conservation status
- Least Concern (IUCN 3.1)

Scientific classification
- Kingdom: Animalia
- Phylum: Chordata
- Class: Actinopterygii
- Division: Teleostei
- Order: Siluriformes
- Family: Siluridae
- Genus: Kryptopterus
- Species: K. bicirrhis

Binomial name
- Kryptopterus bicirrhis Valenciennes, 1840

= Kryptopterus bicirrhis =

Species of fish

Kryptopterus bicirrhis, often called the glass catfish, is an Asian glass catfish species of the genus Kryptopterus. Until 1989, the concept of K. bicirrhis included its smaller relative Kryptopterus vitreolus ("ghost catfish"; often confused with K. minor). Its scientific name K. bicirrhis and common name glass catfish are often still used in the aquarium fish trade to refer to the actual K. vitreolus; as it seems, the larger and more aggressive true K. bicirrhis was only ever exported in insignificant numbers.

In western Borneo, where K. minor and K. bicirrhis are sympatric, both species are known as lais tipis in the Malay language, but when locals want to distinguish the two, they refer to K. minor as lais limpok. In Cambodia it is known as trey kes prak (Khmer: ត្រីកេះប្រាក់) and used to make the fermented fish paste prahok.

== Description ==
The true K. bicirrhis is easily separated from K. vitreolus. K. bicirrhis reaches a significantly larger size, up to 15 cm (5.9 in) standard length, and most of its body is not clearly transparent (only obviously transparent around the head). The body of K. bicirrhis is mostly opaque and light greyish.

When struck by light, it has an iridescence, and it turns milky white as it dies. It has two long barbels for locating food, which are as long again as the body in front of the anal fin. The dorsal fin is reduced to a tiny triangle, and the pectoral fins are longer than the head.

== Ecology ==
Kryptopterus bicirrhis is found in Borneo, Sumatra, the Malay Peninsula, and the Chao Phraya and Mekong drainage basins.

This freshwater catfish inhabits large rivers with turbid water, where they typically live near the shore in fast-flowing water. It seems to prefer peaty water with a rather low temperature for its tropical range, around 21 to 26 °C (70 to 79 °F). It is a diurnal predator and mainly eats water bugs and occasionally smaller fishes.

== Research with Magnetic Fields ==
Kryptopterus bicirrhis are extremely responsive to magnetic stimuli and are known to have electroreceptor organs already. Typically, fish that have this sensitivity to magnetic stimuli are migratory and use this for their sense of direction, but they are nonmigratory fish. The Kryptopterus bicirrhis swim away from any magnetic field above the value of 20 μT (microtesla). This is due to their EPG (electromagnetic perceptive gene), that of which increases the calcium content in the animal's cells when the EMF (electromagnetic field) is stronger. This research may, in the future, have great impacts on how we might control cell activity without having to physically touch cells. This might help to increase the amount of noninvasive brain surgeries, granted more research gets done.

== See also ==
- List of freshwater aquarium fish species
