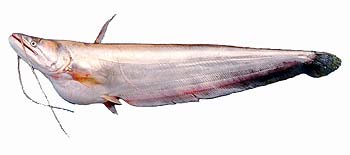
- Wallago attu

Scientific classification
- Kingdom: Animalia
- Phylum: Chordata
- Class: Actinopterygii
- Order: Siluriformes
- Family: Siluridae
- Genus: Wallago; Bleeker, 1851

Type species
- Silurus muelleri Bleeker 1846

Synonyms
- Silurodon Kner, 1866

= Wallago =

Genus of fishes

Wallago is a genus of catfishes order Siluriformes of the family Siluridae, or sheatfish. They are found in rivers throughout southern and southeastern Asia. The only extant species of this genus is Wallago attu.

== Taxonomy ==
The monophyly of this genus is ambiguous and it is not diagnosed by any synapomorphies. The name is derived from Wallagoo, a Telugu name in Vishakapatnam noted by Patrick Russell in his 1803 book.

== Species ==
There are currently 2 recognized species in this genus, of which only one is recent:

- Wallago attu (Bloch & J. G. Schneider, 1801) (Wallago)
- † Wallago maemohensis (Roberts, 2014) (extinct since the Miocene)

For a long time, the Wallago genus was thought to include more species, namely Wallagonia leerii (helicopter catfish), Wallagonia maculatus and Wallagonia micropogon. However, a close investigation by Tyson R. Roberts of their osteological features yielded that all these species actually belong to two entirely separate genera of catfishes, and subsequently all species other than Wallago attu and the extinct Wallago maemohensis were re-categorized into the genus Wallagonia. Additionally, it was found that Wallago and Wallagonia are not particularly closely related within the family of Siluridae.

Wallago hexanema is currently considered a species inquirenda.

== Description ==
The wallago species are large, predatory catfishes. They have five rays in their dorsal fin. The caudal fin is deeply forked and has pointed lobes; it is disconnected from the anal fin, which differs from some of the other silurid genera.

== See also ==
- Wallagonia
