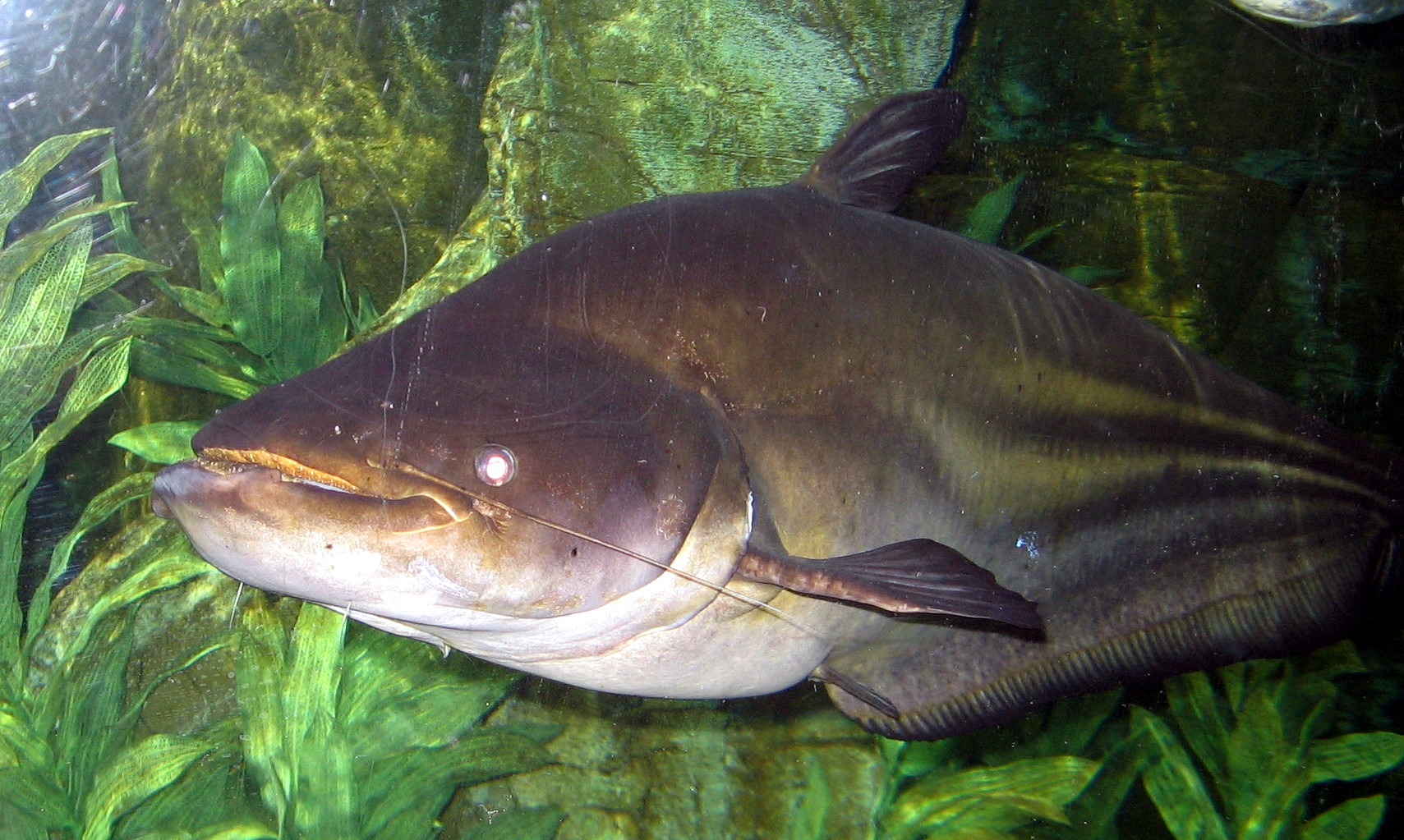
- Wallagonia leerii

Scientific classification
- Kingdom: Animalia
- Phylum: Chordata
- Class: Actinopterygii
- Order: Siluriformes
- Family: Siluridae
- Genus: Wallagonia; Myers, 1938

Type species
- Wallago leerii Bleeker, 1851

= Wallagonia =

Genus of fishes

Wallagonia is a recently established genus of silurid catfishes, containing 3 distinct species, all of whom are native to Southeast Asia:

- Wallagonia leerii (Bleeker, 1851)
- Wallagonia maculatus (Inger & Chin, 1959)
- Wallagonia micropogon (Ng, 2004)

For the longest time, these species were included in the genus Wallago, only in 2014 the separate genus Wallagonia was finally established based on osteological features that clearly separate the two.

While W. leerii is spread widely throughout Southeast Asia, W. micropogon and W. maculatus have a highly restricted habitat, with W. micropogon only occurring in the Mekong river basin and W. maculatus only occurring in the Kinabatangan river basin on the island of Borneo. As the sole difference from W. leerii seems to be a slightly different coloration, biologists are doubtful that they are distinct species at all, instead probably being local subspecies of W. leerii. However, until further research has been performed, they are regarded as valid species.
