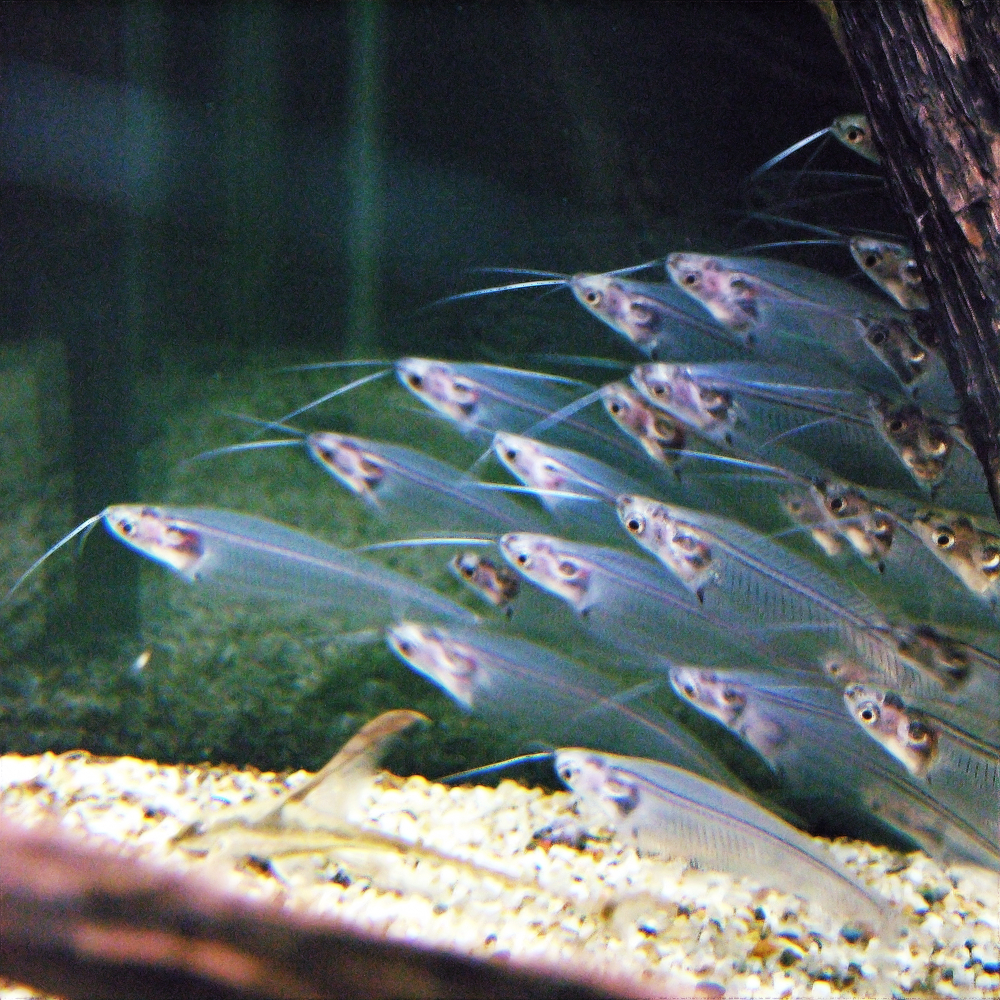
- Kryptopterus vitreolus

Scientific classification
- Kingdom: Animalia
- Phylum: Chordata
- Class: Actinopterygii
- Order: Siluriformes
- Family: Siluridae
- Genus: Kryptopterus; Bleeker, 1857

Type species
- Kryptopterus micropus Bleeker 1857

Diversity
- 19 known species

= Kryptopterus =

Genus of fishes

Kryptopterus swimming in captivity.

Kryptopterus is a genus of catfishes belonging to the family Siluridae. They are found in freshwater throughout Southeast Asia. The scientific name comes from Ancient Greek kryptós (κρυπτός, "hidden") + ptéryx (πτέρυξ, "fin"). It refers to the reduced or even entirely absent dorsal fin of these catfishes.

These small- to medium-sized catfishes have opaque, transparent or translucent bodies, hence their common name Asian glass catfishes. Despite this name, only three described species have clearly transparent bodies: K. minor, K. piperatus and K. vitreolus. Most significant among these is the ghost catfish (K. vitreolus), which is the "glass catfish" most often seen in the aquarium fish trade. This species was initially confused with the larger glass catfish (K. bicirrhis; infrequent in aquarium trade) and subsequently with K. minor (essentially absent from aquarium trade). This matter was only fully resolved in 2013.

== Species ==
While 17 species have been described as of 2025, the genus Kryptopterus is notoriously rich in cryptic species. A number of these have been recognized in recent years, and more are likely to follow:

- Kryptopterus baramensis H. H. Ng, 2002
- Kryptopterus bicirrhis (Valenciennes, 1840)
- Kryptopterus cryptopterus (Bleeker, 1851) (blue sheatfish)
- Kryptopterus dissitus H. H. Ng, 2001 (Indochinese sheatfish)
- Kryptopterus geminus H. H. Ng, 2003
- Kryptopterus hesperius H. H. Ng, 2002 (Maeklong sheatfish)
- Kryptopterus lais (Bleeker, 1851)
- Kryptopterus limpok (Bleeker, 1852) (Long-barbel sheatfish)
- Kryptopterus lumholtzi Rendahl (de), 1922
- Kryptopterus macrocephalus (Bleeker, 1858) (Striped glass catfish)
- Kryptopterus minor Roberts, 1989 (Ghost catfish, glass catfish)
- Kryptopterus mononema (Bleeker, 1846)
- Kryptopterus palembangensis (Bleeker, 1852)
- Kryptopterus paraschilbeides H. H. Ng, 2003
- Kryptopterus piperatus H. H. Ng, Wirjoatmodjo & Hadiaty, 2004
- Kryptopterus schilbeides (Bleeker, 1858)
- Kryptopterus vitreolus H. H. Ng & Kottelat, 2013 (Ghost catfish, phantom catfish, ghost fish, glass catfish)

Some species formerly placed in Kryptopterus are nowadays in other Siluridae genera, in particular Phalacronotus but also Micronema and Pterocryptis.
