= Wallagonia maculatus =

Conservation status
- Vulnerable (IUCN 3.1)

Scientific classification
- Kingdom: Animalia
- Phylum: Chordata
- Class: Actinopterygii
- Order: Siluriformes
- Family: Siluridae
- Genus: Wallagonia
- Species: W. maculatus

Binomial name
- Wallagonia maculatus (Inger & Chin, 1959)

Synonyms
- Wallago maculatus Inger & Chin, 1959

Species of fish

Wallagonia maculatus is a species of catfish in the family Siluridae (the sheatfishes) endemic to Malaysia, where it is known only from Sabah in northern Borneo. This species grows up to a length of 100 centimetres (39 in) SL.

Until osteological research validated the genus Wallagonia in 2014, W. maculatus was included in the genus Wallago.
