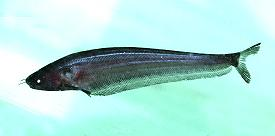
- Hemisilurus mekongensis

Scientific classification
- Domain: Eukaryota
- Kingdom: Animalia
- Phylum: Chordata
- Class: Actinopterygii
- Order: Siluriformes
- Family: Siluridae
- Genus: Hemisilurus; Bleeker, 1857

Type species
- Wallago heterorhynchus Bleeker, 1851

Species
- See text

= Hemisilurus =

Genus of fishes

Hemisilurus is a genus of sheatfishes native to Southeast Asia.

== Species ==
There are currently three recognized species in this genus:

- Hemisilurus heterorhynchus (Bleeker, 1854)
- Hemisilurus mekongensis Bornbusch & Lundberg, 1989
- Hemisilurus moolenburghi Weber & de Beaufort, 1913

Species in this genus have no dorsal fin and only two barbels. Hemisilurus mekongensis, known as Pa nang daeng in the Laotian language (Thai: ปลาดังแดง), is endemic to the Mekong basin.
