= List of storms named Tapah =

The name Tapah (Malay: tapah, [ta.pah]) has been used for five tropical cyclones in the West Pacific Ocean. The name, contributed by Malaysia, refers to Wallago attu in Malay.

- Tropical Storm Tapah (2002) (T0201, 01W, Agaton) – an early season tropical storm that caused minor damages.
- Tropical Storm Tapah (2007) (T0722, 22W) – a weak storm that remained out to sea.
- Severe Tropical Storm Tapah (2014) (T1405, 06W) – remained out to sea.
- Typhoon Tapah (2019) (T1917, 18W, Nimfa) – a fairly strong typhoon that affected South Korea and Japan.
- Severe Tropical Storm Tapah (2025) (T2516, 22W, Lannie) – a severe tropical storm (a Category 1 typhoon by the JTWC) that affected Hong Kong, Macau and South China.

Preceded by Peipah	Pacific typhoon season names Tapah	Succeeded by Mitag
