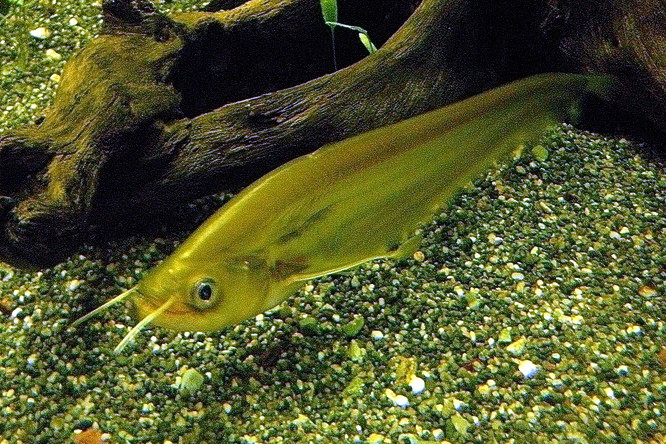
- Belodontichthys dinema

Scientific classification
- Kingdom: Animalia
- Phylum: Chordata
- Class: Actinopterygii
- Order: Siluriformes
- Family: Siluridae
- Genus: Belodontichthys; Bleeker, 1857

Type species
- Belodontichthys macrochir Bleeker, 1857

= Belodontichthys =

Genus of sheatfish

Belodontichthys is a genus of sheatfishes native to Asia.

== Species ==
There are currently two recognized species in this genus:

- Belodontichthys dinema (Bleeker, 1851)
- Belodontichthys truncatus Kottelat & Ng, 1999

B. dinema originates from Laos, Vietnam, Thailand, Malay Peninsula, Sumatra, and Borneo. This species grows up to about 100.0 centimetres (39.4 in) TL. M. dinema occurs in medium to large-sized rivers and is found from middle depths to the surface in deeper parts of large rivers. This species feeds on smaller fish near the water surface. It is an excellent game fish which can be caught using hook and line. Presently, large numbers are being taken near Stung Treng in Cambodia by explosives. It is marketed fresh or dried and salted.

B. truncatus is known from the Mekong and Chao Phraya River basins. This species grows up to 60.0 cm (23.6 in) SL. B. truncatus migrates upstream through the Khone Falls in June to July with other silurids and enters the flooded forest in July to October, where it feeds heavily on cyprinids of the genus Henicorhynchus.
