= Silurichthys =

- Silurichthys schneideri

Scientific classification
- Kingdom: Animalia
- Phylum: Chordata
- Class: Actinopterygii
- Order: Siluriformes
- Family: Siluridae
- Genus: Silurichthys; Bleeker, 1856

Type species
- Silurus phaiosoma Bleeker, 1851

Species
- See text.

Genus of fishes

Silurichthys is a genus of sheatfishes native to Asia.

Some Silurichthys species are economically important as aquarium fishes, and many are useful biological indicators of the health of freshwater or peat swamp forests.

In Silurichthys species, the eyes are small and under the skin. It is likely sexual dimorphism is present in all species, based on species where there enough specimens available. Mature males of all species have a broad and somewhat flattened pectoral fin spine with "serrae" (saw-like teeth); in females and juveniles, the spine is slender and has no spines. The largest species grow to a maximum of 15 or 16 cm (5.9 or 6.3 in).

== Species ==
There are currently 11 recognized species in this genus:

- Silurichthys citatus Ng & Kottelat, 1997
- Silurichthys exortivus Ng & Kottelat, 2022
- Silurichthys gibbiceps Ng & Ng, 1998
- Silurichthys hasseltii Bleeker, 1858
- Silurichthys indragiriensis Volz, 1904
- Silurichthys insulanus Low, Ng & Tan, 2022
- Silurichthys ligneolus Ng & Tan, 2011 (Brown leaf catfish)
- Silurichthys marmoratus Ng & Ng, 1998
- Silurichthys phaiosoma (Bleeker, 1851)
- Silurichthys sanguineus Roberts, 1989
- Silurichthys schneideri Volz, 1904
