= List of storms named Peipah =

The name Peipah (Cantonese: 琵琶, [pʰei˨˩ pʰaː˨˩]) has been used for four tropical cyclones in the West Pacific Ocean. The name, contributed by Macau, means pipa or anglerfish in Cantonese. Peipah replaced Vamei (Cantonese: 畫眉, [waː˨ mei˧˥]) on the naming lists.

- Typhoon Peipah (2007) (T0721, 21W, Kabayan) – affected the Philippines and Vietnam as a minimal typhoon during November
- Tropical Storm Peipah (2014) (T1404, 05W, Domeng) – a weak storm that remained out to sea
- Tropical Storm Peipah (2019) (T1916, 17W) – a weak tropical storm which only sustained itself for 12 hours
- Tropical Storm Peipah (2025) (T2515, 21W, Kiko) – a weak tropical storm that brushed the southern and eastern coasts of Japan

== See also ==
- Cyclone Peta (2013) – an Australian region tropical cyclone with a similar name

Preceded by Nongfa	Pacific typhoon season names Peipah	Succeeded by Tapah
