= Kryptopterus minor =

Conservation status
- Near Threatened (IUCN 3.1)

Scientific classification
- Kingdom: Animalia
- Phylum: Chordata
- Class: Actinopterygii
- Order: Siluriformes
- Family: Siluridae
- Genus: Kryptopterus
- Species: K. minor

Binomial name
- Kryptopterus minor Roberts, 1989

Species of fish

Kryptopterus minor is a small species of Asian glass catfish from the Kapuas River basin in Borneo, Indonesia. Until 2013, the ghost catfish (K. vitreolus) was included in K. minor. The true K. minor is rarely (if ever) seen in the aquarium trade, while K. vitreolus is common.
