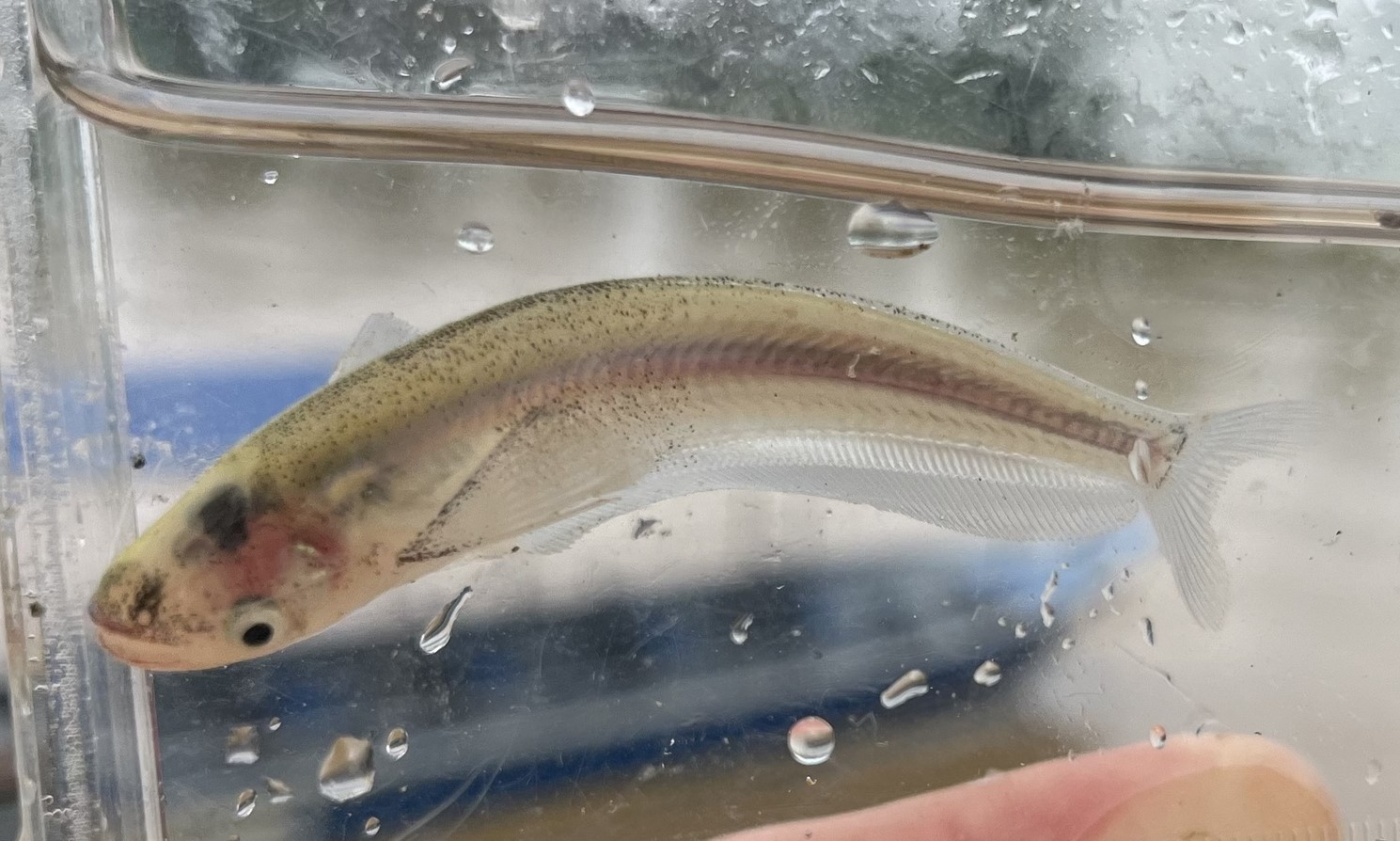
- Micronema hexapterus

Scientific classification
- Kingdom: Animalia
- Phylum: Chordata
- Class: Actinopterygii
- Order: Siluriformes
- Family: Siluridae
- Genus: Micronema; Bleeker, 1858

Type species
- Silurus hexapterus Bleeker 1851

Species
- See text

= Micronema =

Genus of fishes

Micronema is a genus of sheatfishes native to the Southeast Asian region.

== Species ==
There are currently three recognized species in this genus:

- Micronema cheveyi (Durand, 1940)
- Micronema hexapterus (Bleeker, 1851)
- Micronema platypogon (Ng, 2004)

Synonyms

- Micronema moorei (Smith, 1945); valid as M. cheveyi
