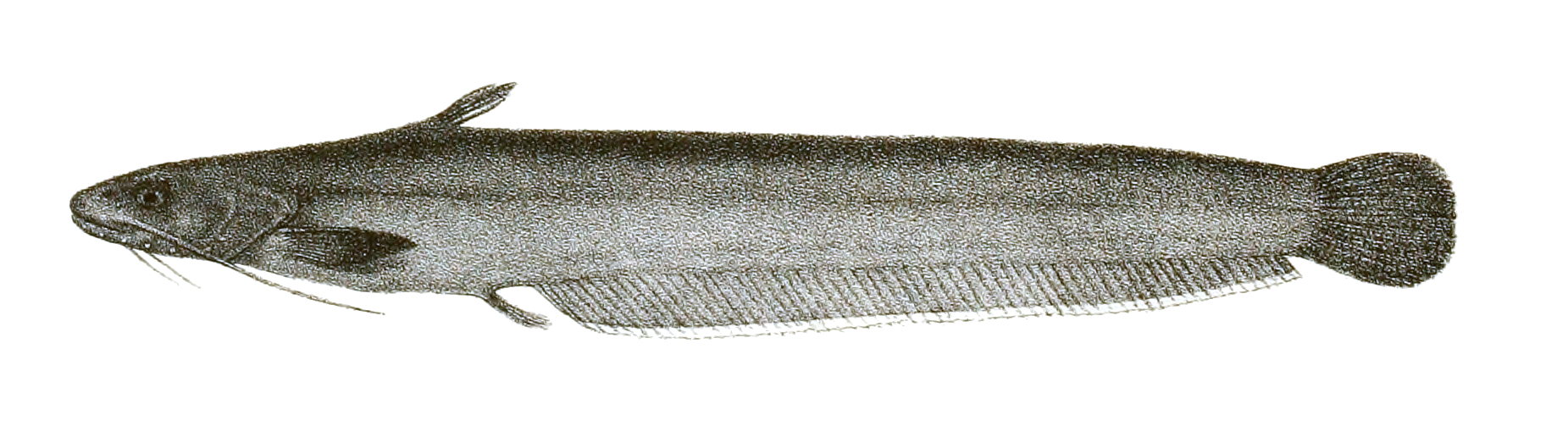
- Pterocryptis wynaadensis

Scientific classification
- Kingdom: Animalia
- Phylum: Chordata
- Class: Actinopterygii
- Order: Siluriformes
- Family: Siluridae
- Genus: Pterocryptis; Peters, 1861

Type species
- Pterocryptis gangelica Peters, 1861

Species
- See text.

Synonyms
- Apodoglanis Fowler, 1905; Hito Herre, 1924; Hitoichthys Herre 1924; Herklotsella Herre, 1933

= Pterocryptis =

Genus of fishes

Pterocryptis is a genus of sheatfish. These fish are medium-sized catfishes usually found in fast flowing mountain streams throughout India, southern China and Southeast Asia. P. buccata is a cavefish.

== Species ==
There are currently 17 recognized species in this genus:

- Pterocryptis anomala (Herre, 1934)
- Pterocryptis barakensis Vishwanath & Nebeshwar Sharma, 2006
- Pterocryptis berdmorei (Blyth, 1860)
- Pterocryptis bokorensis (Pellegrin & Chevey, 1937)
- Pterocryptis buccata H. H. Ng & Kottelat, 1998 (Cave sheatfish)
- Pterocryptis cochinchinensis (Valenciennes, 1840)
- Pterocryptis crenula H. H. Ng & Freyhof, 2001
- Pterocryptis furnessi (Fowler, 1905)
- Pterocryptis gangelica Peters, 1861
- Pterocryptis indica (Datta, Barman & Jayaram, 1987)
- Pterocryptis inusitata H. H. Ng, 1999
- Pterocryptis neglecta (Endruweit, 2025)
- Pterocryptis subrisa Ng, Lalramliana & Lalronunga, 2018
- Pterocryptis taytayensis (Herre, 1924)
- Pterocryptis verecunda H. H. Ng & Freyhof, 2001
- Pterocryptis vorax Ng, Kahar & Tan, 2025
- Pterocryptis wynaadensis (Day, 1873)

Synonyms

- Pterocryptis torrentis (Kobayakawa, 1989); valid as P. berdmorei

== Genomics ==
A near telomere-to-telomere genome assembly of Pterocryptis cochinchinensis was published in 2026, representing a high-quality reference genome for the genus. The genome is approximately 931.7 Mb in size, assembled into 28 chromosomes, with a BUSCO completeness of 96.7%, and 28,079 protein-coding genes functionally annotated.
