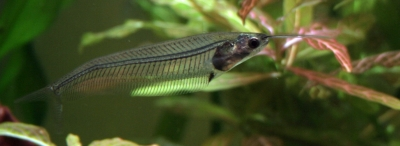

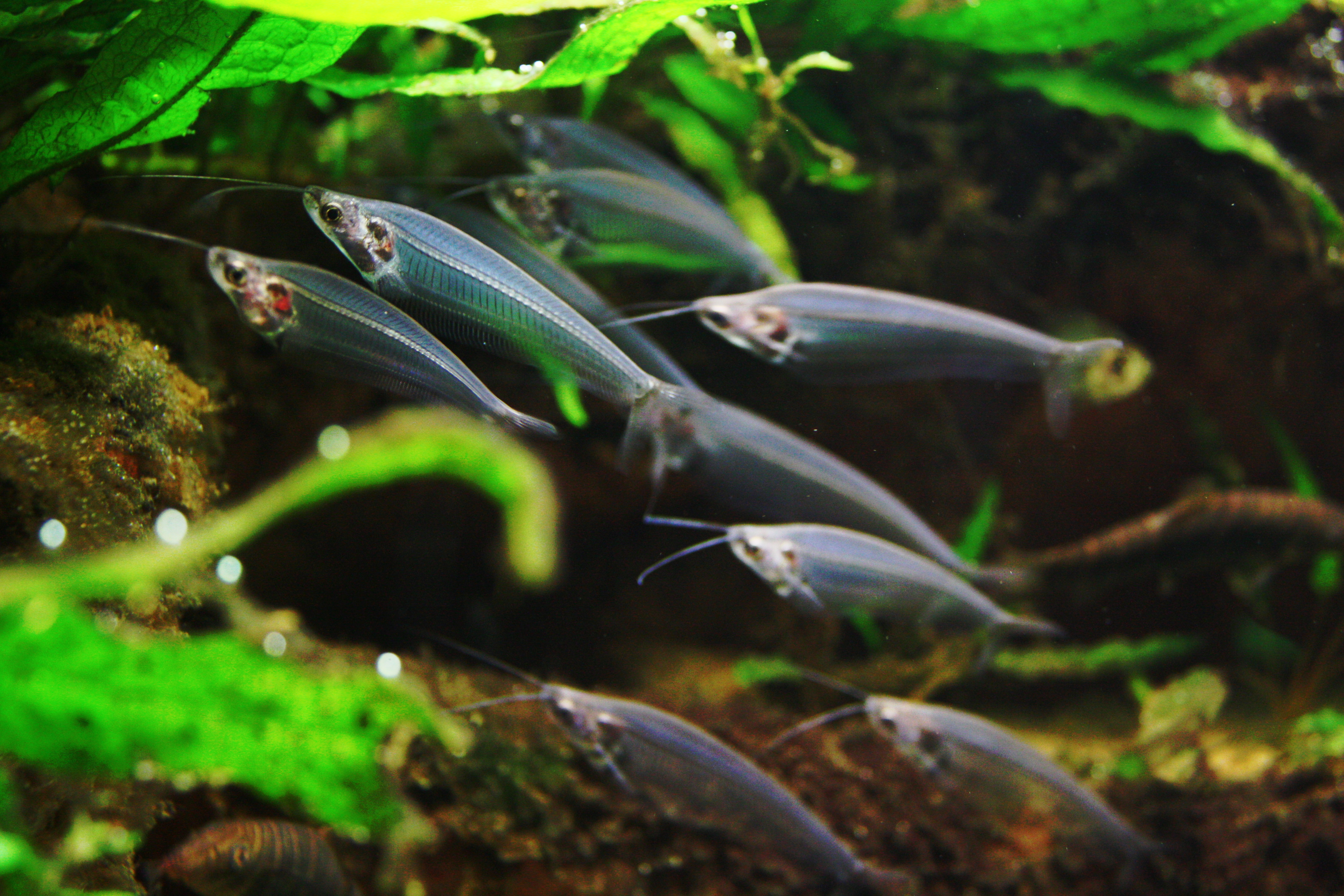
- Schooling group of Kryptopterus vitreolus

Conservation status
- Least Concern (IUCN 3.1)

Scientific classification
- Kingdom: Animalia
- Phylum: Chordata
- Class: Actinopterygii
- Division: Teleostei
- Order: Siluriformes
- Family: Siluridae
- Genus: Kryptopterus
- Species: K. vitreolus

Binomial name
- Kryptopterus vitreolus H. H. Ng and Kottelat, 2013

= Kryptopterus vitreolus =

Species of fish

Kryptopterus vitreolus, known commonly as the glass catfish, the glass cat, the ghost catfish or the phantom catfish, is a small species of translucent-bodied, social glass catfish in the family Siluridae. It is commonly seen in captivity and in the freshwater aquarium trade, although its official taxonomy is still debatable, and was only truly resolved in 2013. Glass catfish are endemic to Thailand, where they inhabit rivers and streams south of the Isthmus of Kra that drain into the Gulf of Thailand and river basins in the Cardamom Mountains. There are also unconfirmed reports from Penang, Malaysia.

Until 1989, K. vitreolus was considered to be the same as another "glass catfish", Kryptopterus bicirrhis, a larger species that is not commonly seen in captivity. Additionally, K. vitreolus was believed to be the same as K. minor until 2013, when it was established that captive specimens actually represented another species, which is now named as K. vitreolus. The true K. minor, which is restricted to Borneo, has rarely, if ever, entered the aquarium trade.

== Description and taxonomy ==
Kryptopterus vitreolus is a small, transparent-bodied, freshwater-dwelling catfish with two long sensory barbels. Standard lengths for mature fish may range up to 8 cm (3.1 in), but usually only reach around 6.5 cm (2.6 in) in total length. Their bodies are transparent because, like all catfish, they lack scales. Additionally, species in the genus Kryptopterus have no body pigment. The species' skin is made of a "plywood"-like structure of collagen fibrils, which allows for light to enter and diffract through the muscles. The majority of their organs are located near the head; with a magnifying glass, the heart can be seen beating. When the light strikes this fish at a certain angle, it can create an iridescent, rainbow effect. During acute periods of illness or after death, the tissues turn a milky-white.

The specific name, vitreolus, is derived from the Latin vitreus, which means 'glass'. Among described species of Kryptopterus, only two other species, K. minor and K. piperatus, have clearly transparent bodies; these species are largely—if not entirely—absent from the aquarium trade. The bodies of other species in the genus, including K. bicirrhis, are only somewhat translucent or opaque.

== In mythology ==
According to Thai folklore, this species of catfish is said to have originated from Phra Ruang, the legendary king who possessed supernatural speech. One tale recounts that after he ate a fish down to its bones, he cast the remains back into the water and uttered a wish for it to live again. Miraculously, the fish returned to life in the form of a glass catfish—hence its other name, pla kang phra ruang (Thai: ปลาก้างพระร่วง, pronounced [plaː kaːŋ pʰraʔ rua̯ŋ], lit. 'Phra Ruang's skeletal fish').

== In captivity ==
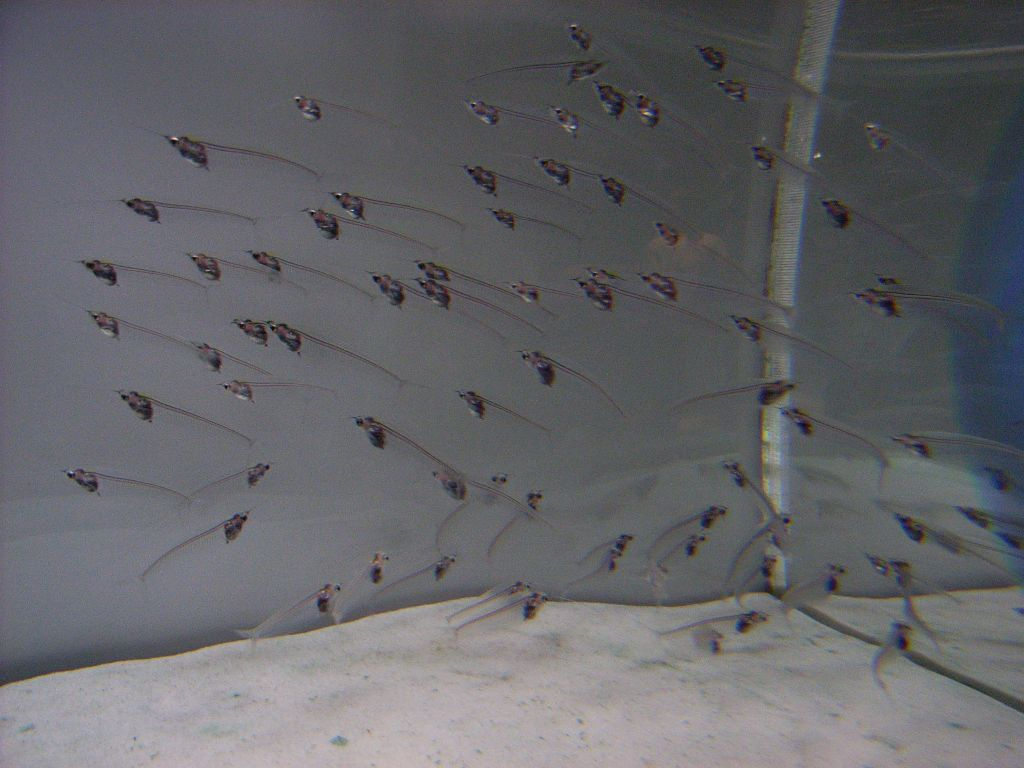
A group of glass catfish schooling

The aquarium trade in K. vitreolus generally relies on wild-caught specimens, and there are concerns that this may be unsustainable due to the volume and its limited range. Unlike many other aquarium fish, it is not known to be bred at commercial facilities.

One of the places where they are caught in the wild is the Phru To Daeng peat swamp forest, Narathiwat province in deep south Thailand.

== Electromagnetic response ==
K. vitreolus reacts to electromagnetic fields owing to a protein encoded by Electromagnetic Perceptive Gene (EPG).

== See also ==
- List of freshwater aquarium fish species
