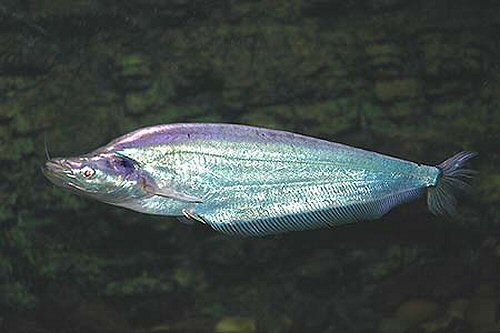
- Phalacronotus apogon

Scientific classification
- Kingdom: Animalia
- Phylum: Chordata
- Class: Actinopterygii
- Order: Siluriformes
- Suborder: Siluroidei
- Superfamily: Siluroidea
- Family: Siluridae; G. Cuvier, 1816

Type genus
- Silurus

Genera
- Silurus; Silurichthys; Ompok; Wallago; Belodontichthys; Hemisilurus; Kryptopterus; Phalacronotus; Micronema; Pterocryptis; Ceratoglanis; Pinniwallago; (Wallagonia)

= Siluridae =

Siluridae Temporal range: Middle Miocene–present

Family of fishes

Siluridae is the nominate family of catfishes in the order Siluriformes. About 105 living species of silurids are placed in 12 or 14 genera.

Although silurids occur across much of Europe and Asia, they are most diverse in Southeast Asia, beyond which their diversity decreases in temperate East Asia, the Indian subcontinent, Southwest Asia, and Europe. Silurids are apparently absent from much of central Asia. The family can be divided into two groups, a temperate North Eurasian clade and a more diverse subtropical/tropical South and Southeast Asian clade.

The oldest fossils of the group are indeterminate remains from the Middle Miocene-aged Sanuki Group of Japan.

== Notable species ==
- Wels catfish, Silurus glanis
- Phantom catfish, Kryptopterus vitreolus
- Wallago attu
- Wallagonia leerii
- Aristotle's catfish
- Amur catfish
- Phalacronotus apogon
- Ompok spp.

== Common features ==
The family Siluridae is very diverse, with not very many distinctive features among all species, but some major ones include gigantism, and smaller versions of attributes that catfish regularly have, such as smaller fins and whiskers. These catfish do not have spines before their dorsal fins or adipose fins, and their pelvic fins are either small or absent. The anal fin base is usually very long. The largest species in this family is Silurus glanis, the Wels catfish, which can grow to lengths over 3 m (9.8 ft) and weigh up to 300 lb (140 kg).
