= List of Thai ingredients =

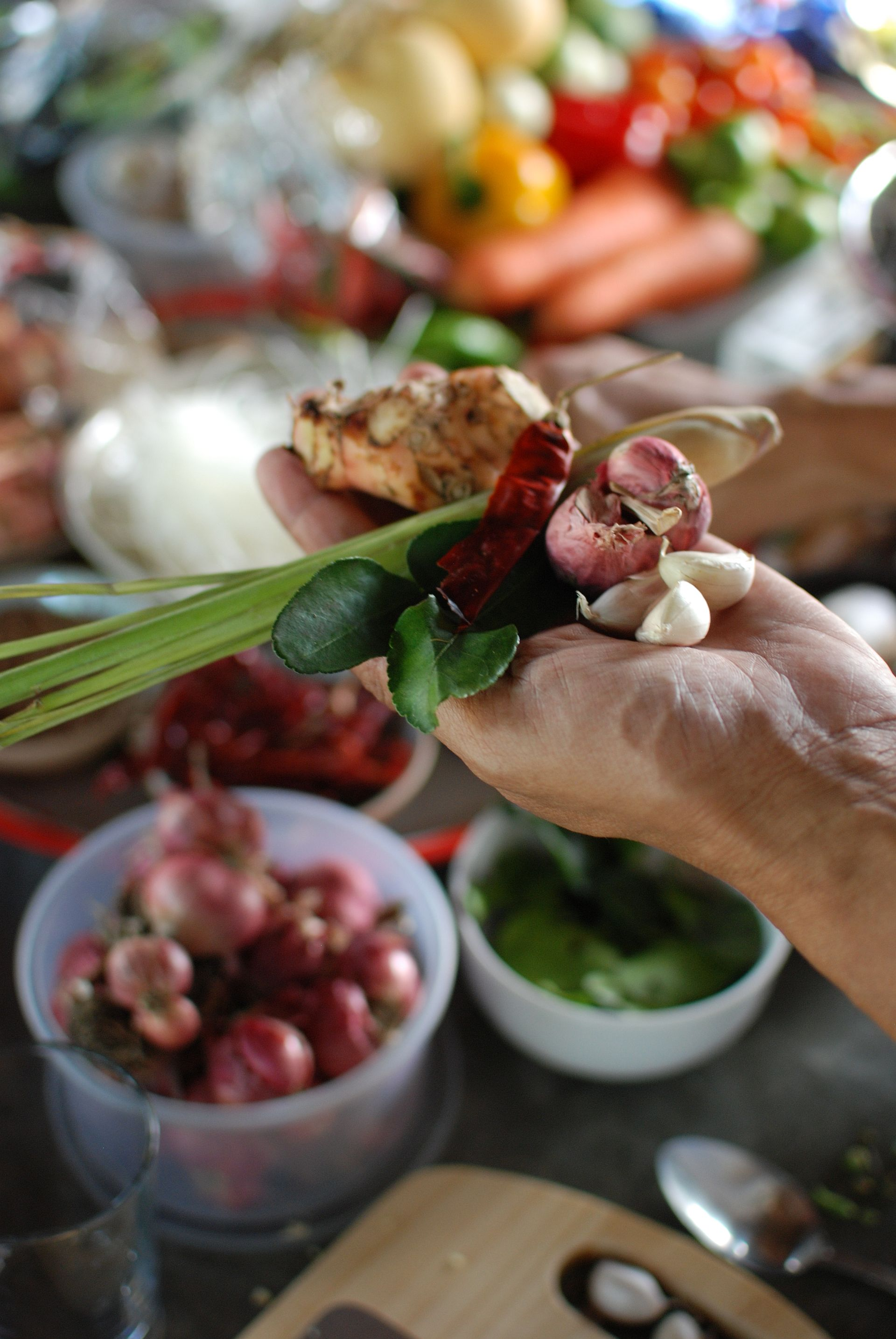
Some of the ingredients for Thai red curry: lemongrass, galangal, kaffir lime leaves, shallots, garlic, and dried red chillies

This is a list of ingredients found in Thai cuisine.

== Herbs and spices ==
=== Fresh herbs and spices ===
| Image | Thai name | Thai script | English name | Description and use |
|---|---|---|---|---|
| | Bai bua bok | ใบบัวบก | Centella asiatica Indian pennywort | Usually made into iced drink. |
| | Bai toei | ใบเตย | Pandan or screwpine leaves | This sweet smelling leaf is used for flavouring different sweet snacks/desserts. It is also used in the well known dish Kai ho bai toei, deep fried chicken wrapped in pandanus leaves, as well as to stuff the belly of barbecued fish |
| | Bai yanang | ใบย่านาง | Tiliacora triandra | Leaves used in the preparation of kaeng no mai som (Thai: แกงหน่อไม้ส้ม), sometimes called kaeng lao (Thai: แกงลาว). |
| | Kuichai | กุยช่าย | Allium tuberosum Chinese chives | Closer in flavour to garlic than onions. Used to season cooking and is used in stir fries such as pad Thai. Comes in green and yellow varieties. |
| | Horapha | โหระพา | Thai sweet basil | A variety of the sweet basil with a taste of anise. It is used in different curries such as red and green curry and often also served separately. |
| | Kha | ข่า | Galangal | The perfume-like scent and flavour of the galangal root is characteristic for many Thai curries and spicy soups. |
| | Khamin | ขมิ้น | Turmeric | This yellow coloured root is often used in dishes of Muslim/Southern Thai origin and in Northern Thailand for Northern style curries. |
| | Khing | ขิง | Ginger | Either served raw (shredded or diced) with dishes such as miang kham and khanom chin sao nam, in certain chilli dips, or in stir fried dishes of Chinese origin. |
| | Krachai | กระชาย | Fingerroot | This root has a slightly medicinal flavour and is used in certain fish dishes and curries. |
| | Kaphrao | กะเพรา | Holy basil | Holy basil has a distinctive scent of clove and reddish tipped leaves. It is used, for instance, in the well-known Phat kaphrao (minced meat fried with holy basil). |
| | Krathiam | กระเทียม | Garlic | Besides being used cooked or fried, garlic is used raw in many dips and salad dressings. It is also served raw on the side with several Thai dishes such as Khao kha mu (stewed pork leg served on rice) or as one of the ingredients for dishes such as Miang kham. |
| | Maenglak | แมงลัก | Lemon basil | The leaves are used in certain curries. It is also indispensable with khanom chin namya. The seeds resemble frog's eggs when soaked in water and are used in sweet desserts. |
| | Phak chi | ผักชี | Coriander/cilantro leaves | The leaves are seen often as a garnish with many Thai dishes. It is indispensable for tom yam soup. |
| | Phak chi farang | ผักชีฝรั่ง | Culantro | A herb often seen in spicy soups and Northern curries. It literally means "European coriander", perhaps because it was brought from the Caribbean to Thailand by Europeans. |
| | Phak chi lao | ผักชีลาว | Dill | Fresh dill is used mainly in certain soups and in curries from north-eastern Thailand which do not contain coconut milk. It literally means "coriander from Laos" in Thai. |
| | Phak phai | ผักไผ่ | Vietnamese coriander | The Persicaria odorata is used sparingly in Thai cuisine. It is indispensable with lap lu, a Northern Thai dish of raw minced pork, beef or buffalo, and blood, with spices, herbs and leaves. |
| | Phrik chi fa | พริกชี้ฟ้า | Chilli spur pepper | Capsicum annuum L. var. acuminatum Fingerh. is a medium-sized chilli and less spicy than the phrik khi nu, it is often added to stir fried dishes and curries as a kind of "vegetable". Either red, yellow, or green in colour. |
| | Phrik khi nu | พริกขี้หนู | Bird's eye chilli | This small chilli is one of the spiciest and used extensively in Thai cooking. The Thai name literally translates to "mouse-dropping chilli" |
| | Phrik khi nu suan | พริกขี้หนูสวน | Garden mouse dropping chilli | This variety of the phrik khi nu is even smaller and even more spicy. |
| | Phrik thai on | พริกไทยอ่อน | Fresh peppercorns | Thai cuisine often uses fresh (green) peppercorns in stir fried dishes and in certain curries such as kaeng pa (so-called jungle curry). |
| | Phrik yuak; phrik wan | พริกหยวก; พริกหวาน | Wax pepper; sweet pepper; bell pepper | Very large, mild tasting pale-green peppers which can be found in certain stir fried dishes or deep fried stuffed with, for instance, pork. |
| | Rak phak chi | รากผักชี | coriander/cilantro root | The roots of the coriandrum sativum are often used in curry pastes and certain soups such as tom yam kung. |
| | Saranae | สะระแหน่ | Spearmint | Used in many Thai salads and sometimes as a way to suppress the 'muddy' taste of certain fish when steamed. |
| | Takhrai | ตะไคร้ | Lemon grass | Used extensively in many Thai dishes such as curries, spicy soups and salads. |
| | Makrut | มะกรูด | Makrut lime, Kaffir lime, Thai lime | Citrus hystrix. The leaves in particular are widely used. |

=== Dried herbs and spices ===
| Image | Thai name | Thai script | English name | Description and use |
|---|---|---|---|---|
| | Dipli | ดีปลี | Long pepper | The dried spice is used in many northern Thai dishes for its heat and flavour. It is most famously used in northern Thai lap. |
| | Dok ngio, dok ngiao | ดอกงิ้ว, ดอกเงี้ยว | Bombax ceiba Cotton tree flowers | The dried flowers of the Bombax ceiba tree, they are used in northern Thai dishes such as nam ngiao. |
| | Kanphlu | กานพลู | Cloves | Used in certain meat dishes, most notably in matsaman curry. |
| | Luk chan thet | ลูกจันทน์เทศ | Nutmeg nut | Used in certain Indian style curries, most notably in matsaman curry. |
| | Makhwaen | มะแขว่น | Zanthoxylum limonella | A type of prickly ash, and related to the Sichuan pepper, these seeds are used most often in northern Thai cuisine for their spicy, hot taste. |
| | Nga | งา | Sesame seed | The oil from the sesame seed is not really used in Thai cuisine (unlike in Chinese cuisine). The seeds (black and white sesame) are mainly used whole in certain deep fried desserts such as thong muan (Thai: ทองม้วน). |
| | Opchoei | อบเชย | Cassia cinnamon | Used in certain meat dishes, most notably in matsaman curry. |
| | Phong kari | ผงกะหรี่ | Curry powder | Thai curries are nearly always made with fresh pastes. Curry powder is only used when making certain Indian influenced curries, as well as in stir-fried dishes (often in combination with scrambled eggs) called phat phong kari. |
| | Phong phalo | ผงพะโล้ | Five-spice powder | The Chinese five-spice powder is used mainly in Thai-Chinese dishes such as mu phalo (pork stewed in soy sauce, Thai: หมูพะโล้) |
| | Phrik haeng | พริกแห้ง | Dried chillies | Dried chillies can be used in many ways in Thai cuisine: either ground into chilli flakes and used as a condiment, as an ingredient for Thai curry pastes, in chilli pastes and dips, or deep-fried and served whole with certain dishes. |
| | Phrik lap | พริกลาบ | | An elaborate mix of dried spices used in lap Lanna, a category of minced meat salads from Northern Thailand. Some of the ingredients used in this spice mix are: coriander seed, nutmeg, cloves, cinnamon, star anise, prickly ash and long pepper. |
| | Phrik pon | พริกป่น | | Crushed dried chillies, used extensively in Thai cuisine, for instance in lap, and for making several types of nam chim and nam phrik (dipping sauces and chilli pastes). Also served as one of the standard accompaniments to noodles soups. |
| | Phrik thai dam | พริกไทยดำ | Black pepper | |
| | Phrik thai (phrik thai khao) | พริกไทย (พริกไทยขาว) | White pepper | |
| | Thian khao plueak | เทียนข้าวเปลือก | Fennel seeds | Most often used as one of the spices in northern Thai phrik larb/lap. |

== Pastes, sauces and condiments ==
| Image | Thai name | Thai script | English name | Description and use |
|---|---|---|---|---|
| | Kapi | กะปิ | Thai shrimp paste | Fermented ground shrimp and salt. It has a pungent aroma. It is used in red curry paste, in the famous chili paste called nam phrik kapi. |
| | Khrueang kaeng | เครื่องแกง | Thai curry paste | Literally meaning "curry ingredients", Thai curry paste can be made fresh at home or bought freshly made at markets in Thailand or pre-packaged for export markets. Most khrueang kaeng will be a ground mixture of fresh or dried chillies, various spices and herbs, and other ingredients such as shrimp paste. Instead of khrueang kaeng, curry pastes can also be called nam phrik in Thailand, although this usually refers to chilli pastes which are eaten as part of a meal. |
| | Pla ra | ปลาร้า | Salt fermented fish sauce | Also a sauce made from fermented fish. It is more pungent than nam pla, and, in contrast to nam pla which is a clear liquid, pla ra is opaque and still contains pieces of fish. Also called pla daek. |
| | Taochiao | เต้าเจี้ยว | Yellow soybean paste | Yellow soybean paste has a sweet-and-salty taste which is more "earthy" than that of soya sauce. It is used in the dish Phak bung fai daeng (stir-fried water spinach. |
| | Thua nao | ถั่วเน่า | Dried soybean disks | Made from fermented soybeans in the form of round patties, within Thailand they are mainly used in northern Thai cuisine as a flavouring agent similar to how shrimp paste is used |

== Vegetables ==
| Image | Thai name | Thai script | English name | Description and use |
|---|---|---|---|---|
| | Bai po | ใบปอ | Corchorus olitorius (Jute) | The leaves are eaten blanched as a dish with khao tom kui (plain rice congee). The taste resembles that of spinach and samphire. |
| | Bai yo | ใบยอ | Noni leaves | Leaves are cooked with coconut milk in kaeng bai yo. |
| | Buap hom | บวบหอม | Luffa aegyptiaca | Used in stir-fries, in curries and in kaeng type soups. |
| | Buap liam | บวบเหลี่ยม | Luffa acutangula | Used in stir-fries and in kaeng type soups. |
| | Chaphlu | ชะพลู, ช้าพลู | Piper sarmentosum | This leaf is used raw as a wrapper for the Thai dish Miang kham. |
| | Fak thong | ฟักทอง | Kabocha | Used in curries, stir-fries, soups, salads and sweets. |
| | Hom daeng | หอมแดง | Shallot | Shallots, not onions, are essential for Thai cuisine. They are used for making Thai curry pastes, salads, and certain condiments and pickles. They are also served raw on the side with certain dishes such as khao soi. |
| | Kalam pli | กะหล่ำปลี | White cabbage | In Thai cuisine, cabbage is often served raw on the side with Thai salads such as som tam or lap, steamed or raw with nam phrik, or boiled in soups and curries. |
| | Khanaeng | แขนง | Cabbage sprouts | The sprouts that come up from the roots after the main cabbage has been harvested, are simply called khanaeng, meaning "sprouts", or khanaeng kalam pli, "cabbage sprouts". They resemble and taste somewhat like brussels sprouts. It is often eaten stir-fried with, for instance, pork. |
| | Khilek | ขี้เหล็ก | Senna siamea | The leaves, tender pods and seeds are edible, but they must be previously boiled and the water discarded. One of the most well-known preparations is kaeng khilek (แกงขี้เหล็ก). |
| | Krachiap | กระเจี๊ยบ | Okra | It is usually served blanched or raw together with a nam phrik (chilli dip), but it may be also served slightly barbecued or used in curries and stir-fried dishes. |
| | Makhuea phuang | มะเขือพวง | Pea eggplant | This pea sized eggplant is often used in curries and is indispensable in nam phrik kapi, a chilli dip containing shrimp paste, where it is used raw. |
| | Makhuea pro | มะเขือเปราะ | Thai eggplant | About the size of a ping pong ball, these eggplants are used in curries or stir-fries, but they are also eaten raw with nam phrik (Chilli dips). |
| | Makhuea thet | มะเขือเทศ | Tomato | Literally meaning "foreign eggplant", it is used in salad such as Som tam, as an ingredient in stir-fries such as in Thai fried rice, but also cooked to a thick sauce as in the chilli paste nam phrik ong. |
| | Mara | มะระ | Bitter melon or bitter gourd | The small variety is most often eaten raw with nam phrik. Popular is tom chuet mara (Thai: ต้มจืดมะระ): bitter gourd in a clear broth, often stuffed with minced pork. |
| | Marum | มะรุม | Drumstick | Most parts of the tree are edible: the long pods, the leaves, the flowers and the roots. Used in curries, stir-fries, soups, omelets, salads and also medicinal preparations. |
| | No mai | หน่อไม้ | Bamboo shoot | Used in stir-fried dishes and Thai curries. |
| | No mai farang | หน่อไม้ฝรั่ง | Green asparagus. | Literally meaning "European bamboo shoot", green asparagus is used mainly in vegetable stir-fries. |
| | Phak bung | ผักบุ้ง | Morning-glory or water spinach | The large variety (phak bung chin) is mostly eaten stir-fried or in soup. The small variety (phak bung na) is generally served raw with som tam or with nam phrik. |
| | Phak chi lom | ผักชีล้อม | Oenanthe javanica | Eaten in soups, curries, stir-fries and also raw. This is one of the vegetables known as phak chi lom, the other is Trachyspermum roxburghianum. |
| | Phak kat hongte | ผักกาดฮ่องเต้ | Bok choy | Used mainly in Thai-Chinese soups and stir-fries, this vegetable is known under several names in Thailand. Besides the aforementioned, it can also be called phak kat hongte (Thai: ผักกาด ฮ่องเต้), phak kwangtung hongte (Thai: ผักกวางตุ้งฮ่องเต้), and phak kwangtung Hong Kong (Thai: ผักกวางตุ้งฮ่องกง). Hongte, derived from the Chinese Hokkien dialect, means "Emperor (of China)", and kwangtung is the Thai word for Guangdong, a province of China. The "Hong Kong" variety of bok choy is generally larger and sweeter than the bok choy known under the other names. |
| | Phak kat khao | ผักกาดขาว | Chinese cabbage | Literally "white cabbage", it is often eaten in soups and stir-fried dishes but also raw, sliced very thin, with certain spicy noodle soups or raw with nam phrik. |
| | Phak kat khiao | ผักกาดเขียว | Mustard greens | Literally "green cabbage", it is often eaten in soups and stir-fried dishes. |
| | Phak khana | ผักคะน้า | Chinese broccoli or Kai-lan | Mostly eaten stir-fried with oyster sauce. |
| | Phak khayaeng | ผักแขยง | Limnophila aromatica | Eaten raw with nam phrik. Popular in Isan. |
| | Phak khom | ผักขม, ผักโขม | Amaranthus spp. | Used in salads and in soups like tom chap chai and tom kha mu. Mostly hybrids are offered in the market. The red-leafed Amaranth is known as phak khom bai daeng (Thai: ผักโขมใบแดง) |
| | Phak krachet | ผักกระเฉด | Water mimosa | Usually eaten raw with nam phrik. Popular in Isan. |
| | Phak krathin | ผักกระถิน | Leucaena leucocephala | Tender shoots and seedpods are eaten raw with nam phrik. |
| | Phak kwangtung | ผักกวางตุ้ง | Choy sum | Literally "Guangdong greens", it is often eaten in soups and stir-fried dishes. |
| | Phak plang | ผักปลัง | Basella alba | Eaten in stir fries and curries such as kaeng liang. |
| | Phak sian | ผักเสี้ยน | Spider plant | The leaves are a popular food item fermented with rice water as phak sian dong pickle. |
| | Phak waen | ผักแว่น | Marsilea crenata | Eaten raw with nam phrik. Popular in Isan. |
| | Phak wan | ผักหวาน | Melientha suavis | Used in soups, mainly the sour soup of the kaeng type. |
| | Riang | เหรียง | Tree bean | The young pods are edible. |
| | Sato khao | สะตอข้าว | Stink bean | The seeds of the Parkia speciosa (inside the pods) are usually eaten in stir fries. |
| | Taengkwa | แตงกวา | Cucumber | Typical Thai cucumbers are small. Eaten raw with nam phrik or as a som tam ingredient. |
| | Talapat ruesi | ตาลปัตรฤๅษี | Limnocharis flava | Eaten in soups, curries, stir-fries as well as grilled. Popular in Isan. It is also known as phak phai (Thai: ผักพาย), not to be confused with phak phai (Thai: ผักไผ่) Persicaria odorata, another type of edible leaf. |
| | Thua fak yao | ถั่วฝักยาว | Yardlong beans | A very versatile bean, it is used in curries and stir-fried dishes, but also served raw in som tam salad or together with a nam phrik (chilli dip). |
| | Thua ngok | ถั่วงอก | Bean sprouts | It is often eaten in soups and stir-fried dishes. Thais tend to eat bean sprouts raw to semi-raw, for instance in phat thai noodles where it is either sprinkled on top of the finished dish raw or added into the pan for one quick stir before serving |
| | Thua phu | ถั่วพู | Winged bean | Often eaten raw with nam phrik. |
| | Thua rae | ถั่วแระ | Soybean | Pods are boiled and seeds are eaten as a snack with salt. |

== Root vegetables ==
| Image | Thai name | Thai script | English name | Description and use |
|---|---|---|---|---|
| | Man kaeo | มันแกว | Jicama | This tuberous root is mostly eaten raw with sugar, as if it was a fruit. |
| | Man sampalang | มันสำปะหลัง | Cassava | A popular traditional cassava-based dish is chueam (Thai: เชื่อม), a candied starchy dessert. The tubers are also used for making tapioca pearls used in desserts and drinks. |
| | Man thet | มันเทศ | Sweet potato | Man thet (literally meaning "foreign tuber") is popularly also known as man daeng (Thai: มันแดง; "red tuber"); boiled pieces are eaten as a snack or used as an ingredient for desserts. |
| | Phueak | เผือก | Taro | Usually boiled pieces are an ingredient of a variety of desserts. Slices of deep fried taro are also popular as a snack. |
| | Rak bua | รากบัว | Lotus root | |

== Flowers and tree leaves ==
| Image | Thai name | Thai script | English name | Description and use |
|---|---|---|---|---|
| | Bai makok | ใบมะกอก | Spondias mombin | Bai makok is the leaf of the Spondias mombin, a relative of the cashew. The young leaves are served raw with certain types of nam phrik (Thai chilli pastes). The taste is sour and slightly bitter. The fruits of this tree are also eaten. |
| | Cha-om | ชะอม | Acacia pennata | Young feathery leaves of the Acacia pennata tree which are used in omelettes, soups and curries. In Northern Thai cuisine they are also eaten raw as for instance with tam mamuang, a green mango salad. |
| | Chiknam, kradon | จิกน้ำ, กระโดน | Barringtonia acutangula | Shoots, young leaves and flowers of the tree are eaten raw with nam phrik. Popular in Isan. |
| | Dala | ดาหลา | Etlingera elatior | Can be eaten in yam preparations, said to have medicinal value as well. |
| | Dok anchan | ดอกอัญชัน | Clitoria ternatea | Can be eaten raw or fried, but mostly it is used to make a blue food colouring to colour rice or sweets, like khanom dok anchan. |
| | Dok khae | ดอกแค | Sesbania grandiflora | The flowers of the Sesbania grandiflora are often eaten steamed with nam phrik or used in certain curries such as kaeng som. |
| | Dok khae thale | ดอกแคทะเล | Dolichandrone spathacea | The flowers are usually eaten sauteed or in kaeng som. |
| | Dok khae hua mu | ดอกแคหัวหมู | Markhamia stipulata | Often confused with dok khae thale, as both are also known as dok khae pa. The flowers are usually eaten sauteed or in kaeng som. |
| | Dok salit | ดอกสลิด | Telosma cordata | Mostly either boiled and eaten with nam phrik or stir-fried in phat dok salit. |
| | Dok sano | ดอกโสน | Sesbania bispinosa | These small yellow flowers are eaten stir-fried, in omelette or in sweets such as in khanom dok sano. |
| | Hua pli | หัวปลี | Banana flower | Banana flowers can be eaten raw, e.g. yam hua pli (a spicy salad with thinly sliced banana flowers), or steamed with a Nam phrik (chilli dip). It can also feature in som tam, in soups or deep-fried, as in thot man hua pli. The taste of the steamed flowers is somewhat similar to that of artichokes. |
| | Lep khrut | เล็บครุฑ | Polyscias fruticosa | Literally translated, the Thai name means "claws of the Garuda". These slightly bitter and slightly sour leaves can be served raw together with a chilli dip. It is also used as a vegetable in certain Thai curries. |
| | Phak liang | ผักเหลียง | Melinjo | Commonly made into an omelet. Associated with Southern Thai cuisine. |
| | Phak lueat | ผักเลือด | Ficus virens | The young, slightly bitter leaves of the Ficus virens are used boiled in certain Northern Thai curries. |
| | Pheka | เพกา | Oroxylum indicum | Leaves and young pods are eaten raw. The large mature pods are grilled and the inside is scraped and eaten along with lap. |
| | Sadao | สะเดา | Neem tree | The leaves and flowers of the neem tree (Azadirachta indica) are eaten blanched, often with nam phrik. |
| | Thonglang | ทองหลาง | Erythrina fusca | This leaf is used raw as a wrapper for the Thai dish Miang kham. |

== Edible fungi and algae ==
| Image | Thai name | Thai script | English name | Description and use |
|---|---|---|---|---|
| | Het fang | เห็ดฟาง (means 'straw mushroom') | Straw mushroom, Volvariella volvacea | Agricultural fungus (widely) Mostly as a kind of vegetable in any soups and curries include tom yam, kaeng pa, kaeng liang, and in several stir fried dishes include phat phak ruam. |
| | Het hom | เห็ดหอม (means 'odoriferous mushroom') | Shiitake, Lentinula edodes | Agricultural fungus (widely) Mostly as a kind of vegetable in any clear soups or any stir-fried dishes. |
| | Het hu nu | เห็ดหูหนู (means 'rat's ear mushroom') | Black/Judas' wood-ear/jelly-fungus, Auricularia auricula-judae & Cloud wood-ear/jelly-fungus, Auricularia polytricha | Agricultural fungus (widely) Mostly as a kind of vegetable in any soups and in several stir fried dishes. |
| | Het hu nu khao | เห็ดหูหนูขาว (means 'white rat's ear mushroom') | White/Snow wood-ear/jelly-fungus, Tremella fuciformis | Agricultural fungus (widely) Mostly as a kind of vegetable in any soups and in several stir fried dishes. |
| | Het khraeng, het tin tukkae | เห็ดแครง (means 'cockle-shell mushroom'), เห็ดตีนตุ๊กแก (means 'gecko-feet mushroom') | Split gill fungus, Schizophyllum commune | Agricultural & Natural fungus |
| | Het khem thong | เห็ดเข็มทอง (means 'golden needle mushroom') | Golden needle mushroom, Enokitake, Flammulina velutipes | Agricultural fungus (widely) Mostly as a kind of vegetable in any clear soups |
| | Het khing | เห็ดขิง (means 'ginger mushroom') | Blancaccio, Lactifluus piperatus | Natural fungus |
| | Het khon khao | เห็ดขอนขาว (means 'white wood mushroom') | Lentinus squarrosulus | Agricultural & Natural fungus |
| | Het ko daeng, het daeng | เห็ดก่อแดง (means 'red mushroom of Ko tree, Sterculia monosperma'), เห็ดแดง (means 'red mushroom') | Rosy russula, Russula lepida | Natural fungus |
| | Het nang fa | เห็ดนางฟ้า (means 'angel mushroom') | Bhutan strain Oyster Mushroom, Lentinus sajor-caju (Synonyms: Pleurotus sajor-caju) | Agricultural fungus (widely) Mostly as a kind of vegetable in any soups include tom kha kai, kaeng pa. |
| | Het nang rom | เห็ดนางรม (means 'oysters mushroom') | Oyster Mushroom, Pleurotus pulmonarius | Agricultural fungus (widely) Mostly as a kind of vegetable in any soups. |
| | Het pluak, het khon | เห็ดปลวก (means 'termite mushroom'), เห็ดโคน | Termite mushroom, Termitomyces fuliginosus Heim | Agricultural & Natural fungus |
| | Het pluak noi, het khon noi, het thua, het kai | เห็ดปลวกน้อย (means 'little termite mushroom'), เห็ดถั่ว (means 'bean mushroom'), เห็ดไก่ (means 'chicken mushroom') | Termite mushroom, Termitomyces fuliginosus & Inky cap mushroom, Coprinus fimetarrius | Agricultural & Natural fungus |
| | Het pho, het thop | เห็ดเผาะ, เห็ดถอบ | Earthstar Puffball, Astraeus hygrometricus | Natural fungus |
| | Het tap tao, het namphueng, het phueng | เห็ดตับเต่า, เห็ดน้ำผึ้ง (means 'honey mushroom'), เห็ดผึ้ง | Salmon gum mushroom, Phlebopus marginatus (Synonyms: Phlebopus portentosus) | Natural fungus |
| | Het yuea phai, het rang hae | เห็ดเยื่อไผ่, เห็ดร่างแห | Bamboo mushroom, Dictyophora indusiata | Agricultural fungus Mostly used in tom yuea phai. |

== Fruits and nuts ==
| Image | Thai name | Thai script | English name | Description and use |
|---|---|---|---|---|
| | Chomphu | ชมพู่ | Rose apple | |
| | Farang | ฝรั่ง | Guava | |
| | Kaeo mangkon | แก้วมังกร | Dragon fruit | There are two varieties in the market, one is white inside, the other dark purple. |
| | Kaolat thai | เกาลัดไทย | Thai Chestnut | Usually eaten boiled or steamed. The nut is smoother than a common chestnut. |
| | Khanun | ขนุน | Jackfruit | All parts of this large fruit are edible. The flesh around the seeds is preferred in Thailand, usually eaten raw or fried. Whole boiled unripe khanun is used in a Northern Thai salad called tam khanun. |
| | Kluai | กล้วย | Banana | Traditionally eaten mainly while green and unripe, steamed, grilled or fried. Also eaten ripe as a fruit. |
| | Krachap | กระจับ | Water caltrop | Also known as water chestnut. It should be eaten boiled because it can be a carrier of fasciolopsiasis. |
| | Krachiap priao | กระเจี๊ยบเปรี้ยว | Roselle | The calyxes are used to make nam krachiap, a popular refreshing drink. |
| | Krathon | กระท้อน | Santol | Used when still not fully ripe as a main ingredient in tam krathon, a variant of som tam. It is also one of the main ingredients in the santol and pork (แกงหมูกระท้อน) and santol and prawn Thai curries (แกงคั่วกระท้อนกุ้ง). |
| | Lamut | ละมุด | Sapodilla | |
| | Lamyai | ลำไย | Longan | |
| | Longkong | ลองกอง | Duku | |
| | Luk nam nom | ลูกน้ำนม | caimito or cainito | Delicious as a fresh dessert fruit; it is sweet and best served chilled. Infusions of the leaves have been used against diabetes and articular rheumatism. The fruit has anti-oxidant properties. The bark is considered a tonic and stimulant, and a bark decoction is used as an antitussive. The fruit also exists in three colours, dark purple, greenish brown and yellow. The purple fruit has a denser skin and texture while the greenish brown fruit has a thin skin and a more liquid pulp; the yellow variety is less common and difficult to find. |
| | Mafai | มะไฟ | Burmese grape | |
| | Makham | มะขาม | Tamarind | The pulp is used to give a pleasant sour taste to some soups, curries and phat thai. Also used to make sweets and refreshing drinks. |
| | Makham thet | มะขามเทศ | Madras thorn | Less strongly flavoured than tamarind, which it resembles. Eaten as a fruit. |
| | Makok | มะกอก | Spondias mombin | Used as a secondary ingredient in som tam. Also marinated. |
| | Malako | มะละกอ | Papaya | Traditionally eaten mainly while green and unripe as a main ingredient in som tam. |
| | Malet bua | เมล็ดบัว | Lotus seed | The seeds of the lotus Nelumbo nucifera are eaten raw or boiled, mainly in certain Thai desserts. The image shows the lotus fruit pods, with the seeds, each encapsulated individually in a rubbery skin, coming out through the surface of the pods. The seeds can also be dried. |
| | Mamuang | มะม่วง | Mango | Often eaten green and sour as an ingredient in salads and sauces, but also as a ripe fruit. |
| | Manao | มะนาว | Lime | Indispensable to Thai cuisine, it serves as the main ingredient for adding acidity to Thai dishes such as with tom yam and lap. It can also be eaten chopped together with the peel in dishes such as miang kham. Mixed with sugar and water it serves as a refreshing drink. Also pickled as manao dong. |
| | Mangkhut | มังคุด | Mangosteen | |
| | Maphrao | มะพร้าว | Coconut | The young nut is popular as a refreshing drink. Coconut milk is extracted out of the grated flesh of the ripe nuts and is used in a number of dishes and curries, especially in Southern Thailand. |
| | Maprang | มะปราง | Bouea macrophylla | The seed is also edible. |
| | Mayom | มะยม | Phyllanthus acidus | Can be used as a secondary ingredient in som tam. |
| | Ngo | เงาะ | Rambutan | |
| | Noina | น้อยหน่า | Sugar-apple | |
| | Phutsa | พุทรา | Jujube | |
| | Sala | สละ | Snake fruit | The taste of the fruit is somewhat musty, and somewhere in between dried bananas, jackfruit, and preserved dates. Some people mistakenly name sala as rakam (Thai: ระกำ), which is another variety of snake fruit with a slightly more watery taste and a more spherical appearance. |
| | Saowarot | เสาวรส | Passionfruit | Used to make refreshing drinks. |
| | Sapparot | สับปะรด | Pineapple | It can also be used in cooking. In Ubon Ratchathani Province pineapple is used to make khem mak nat (Thai: เค็มหมากนัด) fermented fish. |
| | Som o | ส้มโอ | Pomelo | In Thailand, pomelo is often eaten dipped into a spicy mix of dried chilli flakes, sugar and salt. It can also be used in spicy Thai salads such as yam som o (Thai: ยำส้มโอ). |
| | Talingpling | ตะลิงปลิง | Bilimbi | Very sour. Can be used instead of lime or tamarind in soups such as in tom yam. Also eaten raw with sugar and chilli mixture. |
| | Thurian | ทุเรียน | Durian | One of the most popular, and due to its odour also infamous, fruits in Thailand. Some cultivars grown in Thailand are Chani, Mon Thong, Kan Yao, Ruang, Kradum and, shown here on the photo, Long Laplae. |

== Staple foods and other starches ==
| Image | Thai name | Thai script | English name | Description and use |
|---|---|---|---|---|
| | Bami | บะหมี่ | Egg noodles | Similar to the Chinese mee pok and lamian, it was not common in Thailand until in recent years as it is made from wheat which had to be imported. It is used stir-fried, deep-fried (mi krop) and in noodle soups. |
| | Khanom chin | ขนมจีน | Thai rice vermicelli | Fresh rice vermicelli made from fermented rice. It is commonly seen as a noodle to go with certain spicy soups and curries, but it is also popular with som tam and other Thai salads. Mon (มอญ) origin. |
| | Khao | ข้าว | Rice | The ultimate staple food for Thai people, so much that it can also mean "food" in general as in kin khao: "to eat (kin) rice" means the same as "to eat food". |
| | Khao hom mali | ข้าวหอมมะลิ | Jasmine rice or Thai fragrant rice | This long-grained variety of rice, with its nutty aroma and a subtle pandan-like flavour, originates from Thailand and now forms the bulk of Thailand's rice crop. |
| | Khao niao | ข้าวเหนียว | Glutinous rice or sticky rice | The main type of rice traditionally eaten in the northeast and north of Thailand. It is often served in a special bamboo container called a kratip khao |
| | Khao niao dam | ข้าวเหนียวดำ | Black glutinous rice | With a nutty taste, it can be mixed together with steamed white rice and eaten with savoury dishes or served sweetened with coconut milk. |
| | Kuaitiao | ก๋วยเตี๋ยว | Rice noodles | The generic Thai word for rice noodles. The name comes from the Teochew dialect of Chinese, where the word kuaitiao literally means "cake strips". In Chinese it only designates the wide variety which in Thai is called kuaitiao sen yai (see shahe fen). |
| | Paeng khao chao | แป้งข้าวเจ้า | Rice flour | Used mainly in desserts and as a thickening agent |
| | Paeng man sampalang | แป้งมันสำปะหลัง | Tapioca flour | Used mainly in desserts and as a thickening agent |
| | Sen lek | เส้นเล็ก | Narrow rice noodle | Narrow, flat rice noodles; used in such dishes as phat thai and in noodle soups. Its full name would be kuaitiao sen lek. |
| | Sen mi | เส้นหมี่ | Rice vermicelli (thin) | Similar to the Chinese rice vermicelli; used in noodle soups. Its full name is kuaitiao sen mi. |
| | Sen yai | เส้นใหญ่ | Wide rice noodle | Wide, flat rice noodles, similar to the Chinese shahe fen; used in dishes such as kuaitiao phat si-io and in noodle soups. Its full name is kuaitiao sen yai. |
| | Wunsen | วุ้นเส้น | Cellophane noodles or glass noodles | Extremely thin noodles made from mung bean flour which turns transparent when moist. It can be used in salads and soups, or stir-fried. |

== Meat and poultry ==
| Image | Thai name | Thai script | English name | Description and use |
|---|---|---|---|---|
| | Kop na India | กบนาอินเดีย | Indian bullfrog | Frog meat in Thailand (nearly the whole frog, not just the legs as in the West) is mostly used in stir-fries and Thai curries. This species (Hoplobatrachus tigerinus, Indian bullfrog) is farmed, as is the American bullfrog (Rana catesbeiana). |
| | Ueng pak khuat | อึ่งปากขวด | Balloon Frog | Traditionally considered a delicacy and eaten whole barbecued as ueng yang (อึ่งย่าง), but also deep-fried and in soups. Wild populations have been severely depleted. |
| | Mu yong | หมูหย็อง | Dried shredded pork | Eaten as a snack, more commonly as a topping in rice porridge, and as a topping on pastries |

== Fish and seafood ==
| Image | Thai name | Thai script | English name | Description and use |
|---|---|---|---|---|
| | Hoi khraeng | หอยแครง | Blood cockle | Eaten raw or blanched with a nam chim (spicy dipping sauce), or used blanched in a Thai salad. |
| | Hoi lai | หอยลาย | Undulated Venus | This clam is highly appreciated in Thai cuisine; usually steamed, stir-fried or added to soups. |
| | Hoi malaeng phu | หอยแมลงภู่ | Asian green mussel | Usually steamed or also boiled in soups. |
| | Kung haeng | กุ้งแห้ง | Dried shrimp | Salted and sun-dried, dried shrimp feature in many dishes and chilli pastes. They are often soaked in water before use. |
| | Kung kam kram | กุ้งก้ามกราม | Giant river prawn | Mostly bred in local fish farms. Boiled in tom yam, grilled or fried. |
| | Kung khao | กุ้งขาว | Whiteleg shrimp | Bred in local fish farms. Perhaps the most common shrimp currently used in tom yam kung. |
| | Pla chon | ปลาช่อน | Channa striata | Usually eaten barbecued or steamed. It is the main fish used in the preparation of pla ra sauce. |
| | Pla daeng | ปลาแดง | Phalacronotus bleekeri | It is one of the very similar catfish species known in the markets as pla nuea on (วงศ์ปลาเนื้ออ่อน). Valued for its delicate flesh; also used for making high-quality fish balls. |
| | Pla duk | ปลาดุก | Clarias batrachus | Usually eaten barbecued, but also flaked and deep-fried in yam pla duk fu. |
| | Pla kot khang | ปลากดคัง | Hemibagrus wyckioides | A type of catfish usually used in Thai cuisine in tom yam or, when shortly blanched, to be eaten with a nam chim (dipping sauce). |
| | Pla kraho | ปลากระโห้ | Siamese giant carp | Highly valued in traditional Thai cuisine. Like most of the Thai food species that are not bred in fish farms, overfishing has caused a serious decline in its numbers. |
| | Pla krai | ปลากราย | Chitala ornata | Usually eaten deep-fried with nam chim (spicy dipping sauce) and leafy greens. It is the main fish used in thot man pla (Thai fish cakes). |
| | Pla kaphong khao | ปลากะพงขาว | Barramundi | Prepared in a variety of ways, boiled or fried, especially good boiled with lemon. Presently most pla kaphong in Thailand are barramundi from local fish farms. |
| | Pla kaphong daeng | ปลากะพงแดง | Mangrove red snapper | |
| | Pla lai na | ปลาไหลนา | Swamp eel | Traditional food item found in flooded ricefields. Usually eaten in tom yam. |
| | Pla ma | ปลาม้า | Boeseman croaker | A highly valued fish in Thai cuisine, nowadays it is rare and expensive owing to pollution and overfishing. |
| | Pla mo | ปลาหมอ | Climbing perch | Common in the ricefield ecosystem. Eaten in curry or tom yam. |
| | Pla namngoen | ปลาน้ำเงิน | Phalacronotus apogon | It is one of the very similar catfish species known generically in the markets as pla nuea on (วงศ์ปลาเนื้ออ่อน). Highly valued for its delicate flesh; also used for making fish balls. |
| | Pla nin | ปลานิล | Oreochromis niloticus | Barbecued, boiled or fried. Especially popular rubbed with salt and barbecued. Nile Tilapia in Thailand are bred in local fish farms. |
| | Pla sai daeng | ปลาทรายแดง | Ornate threadfin bream | It is most often used deep-fried |
| | Pla salat | ปลาสลาด | Bronze Featherback | Dried and smoked it is the main ingredient of a type of nam phrik |
| | Pla salit | ปลาสลิด | Snakeskin gourami | Usually fried or barbecued. |
| | Pla sawai | ปลาสวาย | Iridescent shark | Traditionally boiled in tom yam or fermented with pineapple as khem mak nat. Now often cut in fillets, battered and deep-fried. |
| | Pla sio ao | ปลาซิวอ้าว | Luciosoma bleekeri | One of the most abundant of the different types of minnow-sized fishes (pPla sio) used in Thai cuisine. These tiny fish are often eaten salted and dried, fried, but also raw in Isan cuisine. |
| | Pla taphian | ปลาตะเพียน | Silver Barb | Bred in local fish farms. Usually either pickled as pla som (ปลาส้ม) or boiled in tom yam. |
| | Pla thapthim | ปลาทับทิม | Red hybrid of Oreochromis niloticus | The red-hybrid Oreochromis niloticus is known as pla Thapthim ("pomegranate fish"). They are bred in local fish farms. |
| | Pla thu | ปลาทู | Processed mackerel | Steamed and salted Shortbodied or Indian mackerel. Usually eaten with nam phrik kapi (a chili and shrimp paste dip) and leafy greens and vegetables. |
| | Pla yisok | ปลายี่สก | Jullien's Golden Carp | One of the most valued fishes in traditional Thai cuisine, nowadays it has become rare and expensive due to overfishing. |
| | Pu ma | ปูม้า | Portunus pelagicus | Highly appreciated relatively large crab, featuring in standard dishes as pu ma phat ton hom (Thai: ปูม้าผัดต้นหอม; Blue crab stir-fried with spring onions), among others. |
| | Pu na | ปูนา | Rice field crabs | When pickled they are most often called pu dong (pickled crab; Thai: ปูดอง), or less often pu khem (salted crab; Thai: ปูเค็ม), and frequently used in papaya salad or as the main ingredient in yam pu dong (yam-style salad made with pickled crab). |
| | Maeng da thale | แมงดาทะเล | Horseshoe crab | Available seasonal when they still carry their eggs. It's grilled and only the eggs are made into yam maeng da. |
| | Kang kaeo | กั้งแก้ว | Mantis shrimp | Usually deep fried with garlic. |
| | Kang kradan | กั้งกระดาน | Flathead lobster | Usually deep fried with garlic, grilled or steamed. |

== Insects ==
| Image | Thai name | Thai script | English name | Description and use |
|---|---|---|---|---|
| | Chingrit | จิ้งหรีด | Cricket | The crickets used in Thailand can be either the native species, Gryllus bimaculatus and Teleogryllus testaceus, or, as shown in the image, the introduced Acheta domesticus. Although all three species are farmed commercially, it is Acheta domesticus that is most popular, due to its superior taste and texture. Crickets are most commonly eaten deep-fried as a snack. |
| | Khai mot daeng | ไข่มดแดง | Oecophylla smaragdina | Although known as 'eggs' in Thai, these are the pupae of the weaver ant. They may be used in salads, soups, curries and omelets. The taste is creamy and slightly lemony. |
| | Malaeng da (common pronunciation "maeng da") | แมลงดา ("แมงดา") | Lethocerus indicus | In contrast to most other insects that are eaten in Thailand, this giant water bug has a strong taste and smell which, according to some, comes close to that of ripe gorgonzola. It is normally eaten deep-fried as a snack or used to make a famous chilli dip called nam phrik maeng da. |
| | Malaeng krachon | แมลงกระชอน | Mole cricket | Captured in their burrows in the ricefields during the dry season. Valued as food in Isan. |
| | Non mai phai | หนอนไม้ไผ่ | Omphisa fuscidentalis | Known as "bamboo worms" in Thailand, these caterpillars live inside certain bamboos in northern Thailand. They are most often eaten deep-fried. Due to their appearance, they are often also called rot duan, meaning "express train". |

== Miscellanea ==
| Image | Thai name | Thai script | English name | Description and use |
|---|---|---|---|---|
| | Bai tong/bai kluai | ใบตอง/ใบกล้วย | Banana leaf | When used as a way of wrapping food, it is known as bai tong (ใบตอง). When used for steaming dishes such as ho mok pla, it also imparts a subtle flavour. |
| | Bai bua | ใบบัว | Lotus leaf | Used to wrap food. Also to put food on top of it in Buddhist offerings. |

== See also ==
- Thai cuisine
- List of Thai dishes
- List of Thai restaurants
