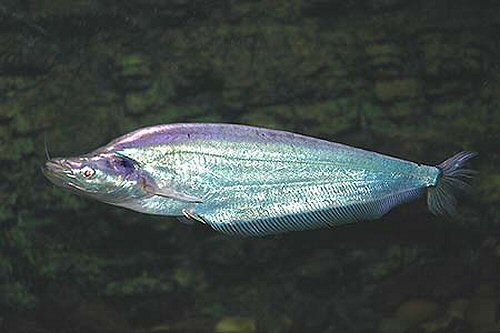
- Metallic sheatfish (Phalacronotus apogon)

Scientific classification
- Kingdom: Animalia
- Phylum: Chordata
- Class: Actinopterygii
- Order: Siluriformes
- Family: Siluridae
- Genus: Phalacronotus; Bleeker, 1857

Type species
- Silurus phalacronotus Bleeker 1851

Species
- See text

= Phalacronotus =

Genus of fishes

Phalacronotus is a genus of sheatfishes native to Asia

== Species ==
There are currently four recognized species in this genus:

- Phalacronotus apogon (Bleeker, 1851) (Metallic sheatfish)
- Phalacronotus bleekeri (Günther, 1864) (Bleeker's sheatfish)
- Phalacronotus micronemus (Bleeker, 1846)
- Phalacronotus parvanalis (Inger & Chin, 1959)

== As food ==
Sheatfishes are some of the catfish species known in Thailand as Pla nuea on (Thai: ปลาเนื้ออ่อน), some of the most highly valued fish kinds in Thai cuisine.

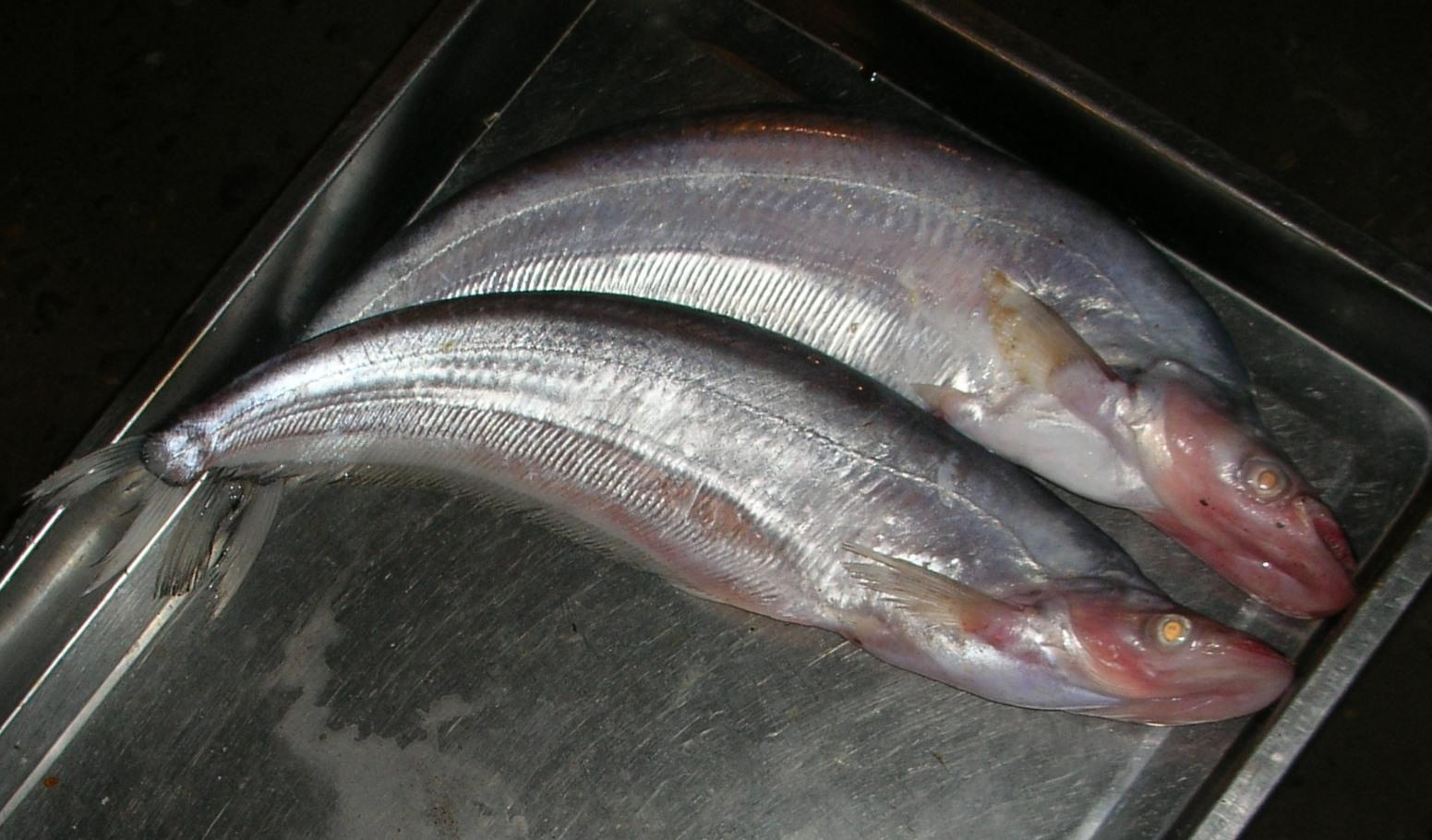
Phalacronotus bleekeri at the market in Chiang Rai, Thailand

== See also ==
- List of Thai ingredients
