= Pla nuea on =

Pla nuea on (Thai: ปลาเนื้ออ่อน, tender-fleshed fish) may refer to:

- A generic name for certain catfish fish species in Thailand
- Kryptopterus cryptopterus (Blue sheatfish)
- Ompok bimaculatus (Butter catfish)
- Phalacronotus apogon (Metallic sheatfish)
- Phalacronotus bleekeri
