= Green papaya salad =

Spicy salad made from unripe papaya

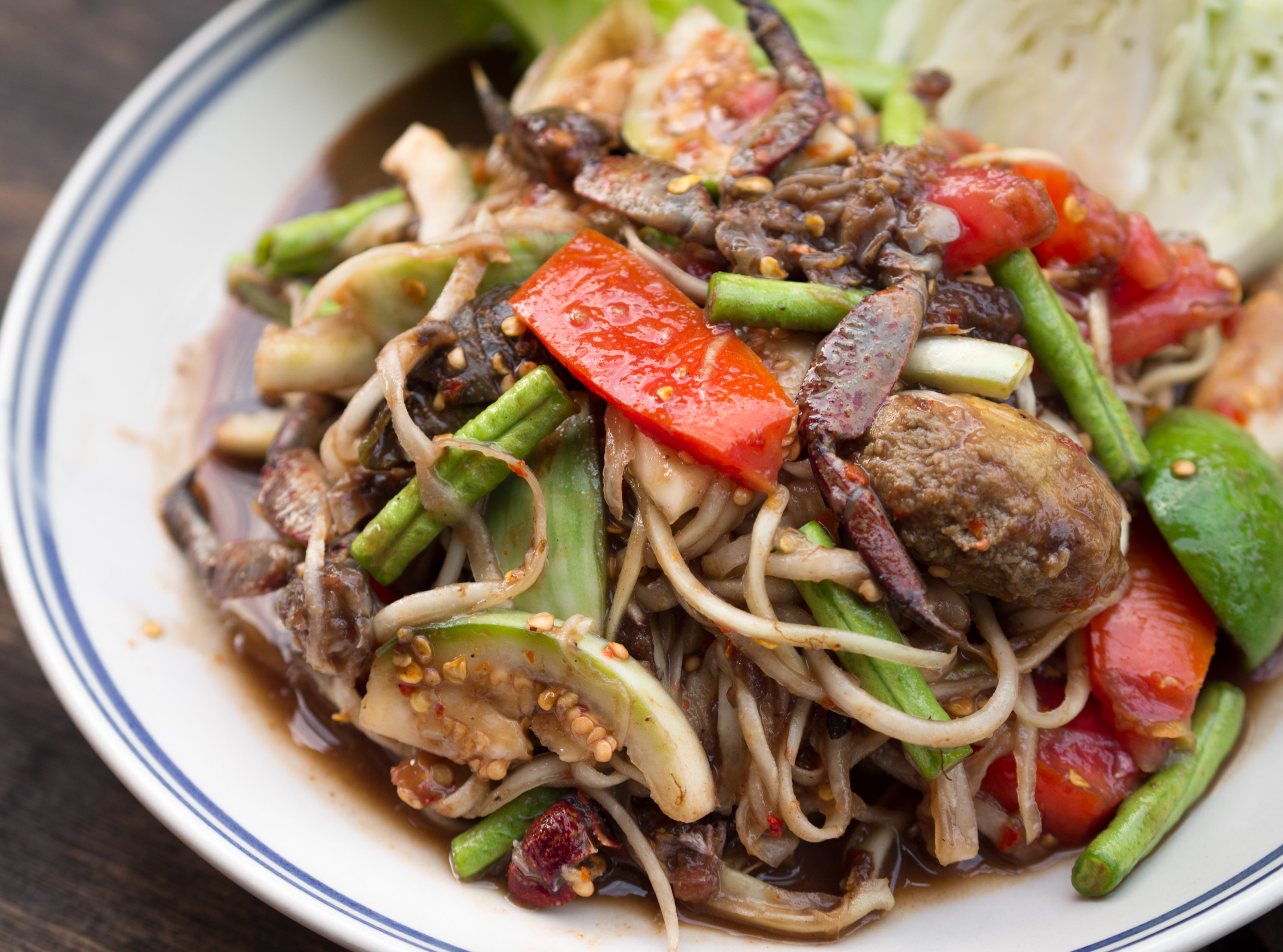
- Green papaya salad with yardlong beans, chili, pla ra, brined crab, hog plum and lime
- Type: Salad
- Place of origin: Laos
- Region or state: Southeast Asia
- Associated cuisine: Xishuangbanna (China), Burmese, Cambodian, Lao, Thai, Vietnamese
- Main ingredients: Green papaya

Green papaya salad (Note: Burmese: သင်္ဘောသီးသုပ်; Khmer: បុកល្ហុង; Lao: ຕຳຫມາກຫຸ່ງ/ຕໍາສົ້ມ, pronounced [tàm mȁːk.hūŋ, tàm.sȍm]; Rakhine: ပဒကာသီးသုပ်; Northeastern Thai: ตำบักหุ่ง/ตำส้ม, pronounced [tām bǎk.hūŋ, tām.sòm]; and Vietnamese: gỏi đu đủ) is a spicy salad made from shredded unripe papaya. It is believed to have been created by Lao people and is considered one of the national dishes of Laos.

The dish is also popular in neighboring Thailand, particularly in the Isan region, where the population is predominantly ethnic Lao. From Isan, green papaya salad spread throughout Thailand and became a staple of Thai cuisine. Beyond Laos and Thailand, green papaya salad has also gained popularity across continental Southeast Asia, including Cambodia, Myanmar, and Vietnam..

== Etymology ==
In Laos, the dish is called tam mak hoong (Lao: ຕຳຫມາກຫຸ່ງ, pronounced [tàm mȁːk.hūŋ], lit. 'pounded papaya') or tam som (Lao: ຕໍາສົ້ມ, pronounced [tàm.sȍm], lit. 'sour pounded [salad]'), in which the word tam (Lao: ຕໍາ) refers to the pounding of ingredients in a mortar. In Thai cuisine , the dish is known as som tam (Thai: ส้มตำ, pronounced [sôm.tām], RTGS: somtam). It is variously known as: Burmese: သင်္ဘောသီးသုပ်; Khmer: បុកល្ហុង; Rakhine: ပဒကာသီးသုပ်; Northeastern Thai: ตำบักหุ่ง/ตำส้ม, pronounced [tām bǎk.hūŋ, tām.sòm]; and Vietnamese: gỏi đu đủ.

== History ==
Papayas and chili peppers were introduced to Southeast Asia by the Spanish and Portuguese explorers in the 17th century from the Americas in the Columbian Exchange. Simon de la Loubère (1642–1729), a French diplomat, mentioned in his book that the cultivation of papaya was already widespread in Siam in 1693.

Although it is unknown when papayas and chili peppers entered Laos specifically, they had already been fully integrated into the Lao territory by the time Jean-Baptiste Pallegoix and Henri Mouhot visited in mid-1800s, and were listed among key ingredients for preparing main Lao dishes. The Lao were introduced to papaya (mak hung) from Khmer Loeu living in provinces bordering the southeastern Laos (who called them l'hun or lohung/rohung in Khmer). Papaya, among other fruits, were cultivated in Cambodia in the 1500s.

Green papaya salad was mentioned as a favorite Lao dish by a former Lao politician, Katay Don Sasorith (1904–1959), in a memoir recounting his experience during his primary school years in 1910s. Furthermore, according to the travelogue "Nirat Wang Bang Yi Khan" written in 1869 by Thai poet Khun Phum, the dish was already known among members of the Lao royal family living as war hostages in Bang Yi Khan compound in Bangkok, Siam. Thai historian Sujit Wongthes has speculated that the green papaya salad originated during the late 18th to early 19th centuries in the communities of ethnic Chinese–Lao settlers living in what is now Central Thailand, where papayas were widely cultivated by Chinese immigrants. The Lao settlers, who were war captives deported from Lan Xang, adopted the ancient Lao tradition of preparing salads from fruits, called tam som, to make salads from papayas. The new dish became known as som tam (the reversed order of tam som) and, along with the papayas, then spread to today's Northeast Thailand following the construction of the Northeastern railway line during the turn of the 19th–20th centuries. The dish became more popular after the opening of Mittraphap Road in 1957, and has since become widely adopted by the ethnic Lao people of both Isan and Laos. Likewise, the hot flavour also spread to Isan and Laos from Central Thailand, which had been introduced to chilli peppers first.

However, papayas and chili peppers were already integrated in the Lao territory and Lao culinary recipes in mid-1800s to early 1900s while, during the 1950s and 1960s, green papaya salad and other Lao dishes were rarely known in Bangkok. They could only be found around the boxing stadium that gathered boxers and fans from Northeastern Thailand, as well as in mobile food carts outside construction sites with Northeastern workers and gas stations serving long-distance bus drivers. Some believe that som tam gained popularity among the young Thai generations following an active publicity in the 1970s. Furthermore, it was created using refined recipes of Lao tam som, or tam mak hung, likely brought to Bangkok by migrant workers from the Northeast during the mid-1900s. During the standardization of the Thai national cuisine, green papaya salad was among the Northeastern or Lao dishes to be included into the Thai national cuisine and modified by reducing the amount of chilli peppers and increasing the amount of sugar.

Others believe that som tam has evolved from a Thai dish called pu tam or tam pu (Thai: ปูตำ หรือ ตำปู, lit. 'crab salad') mentioned in a recipe by chef Khunying Plian Phatsakarawong in her 1908 cookbook Tamra Mae Khrua Hua Pak. This dish shares similarities with modern-day som tam but does not include papaya as an ingredient.

The earliest known recipe for green papaya som tam in Thai print appears in Tamra Khraawp Lo:hk (Thai: ตำราครอบโลก, "A Cookbook Encompassing the World"), Volume 1, published in 1929 by the Lee Hong Wan Sao Ching Cha Press in Bangkok and authored under the pseudonym naang saao H.D. (น.ส.ห.ด). The recipe is titled som tam mamalakor (ส้มตำมะละกอ) and appears at page 70 within the yam (ยำ) chapter as a freestanding yam-family dish.

A second early Thai recipe appears six years later in the Yaowapha cookbook series by Princess Yaovabha Bongsanid, published in 1935, which records khao man som tam (Thai: ข้าวมันส้มตำ) — a central-Thai samrap (set meal) in which a som tam thai deerm (old-fashioned Thai som tam) component is served with coconut-cream rice, spice curry, tamarind chili relish, sweet meat threads, salted fish fried in egg batter, and battered fried leaves and flowers. This recipe includes roasted peanuts and dried shrimp as key ingredients and combines the dressing with shredded papaya in a bowl rather than pounding the ingredients together in a mortar.

== Preparation ==
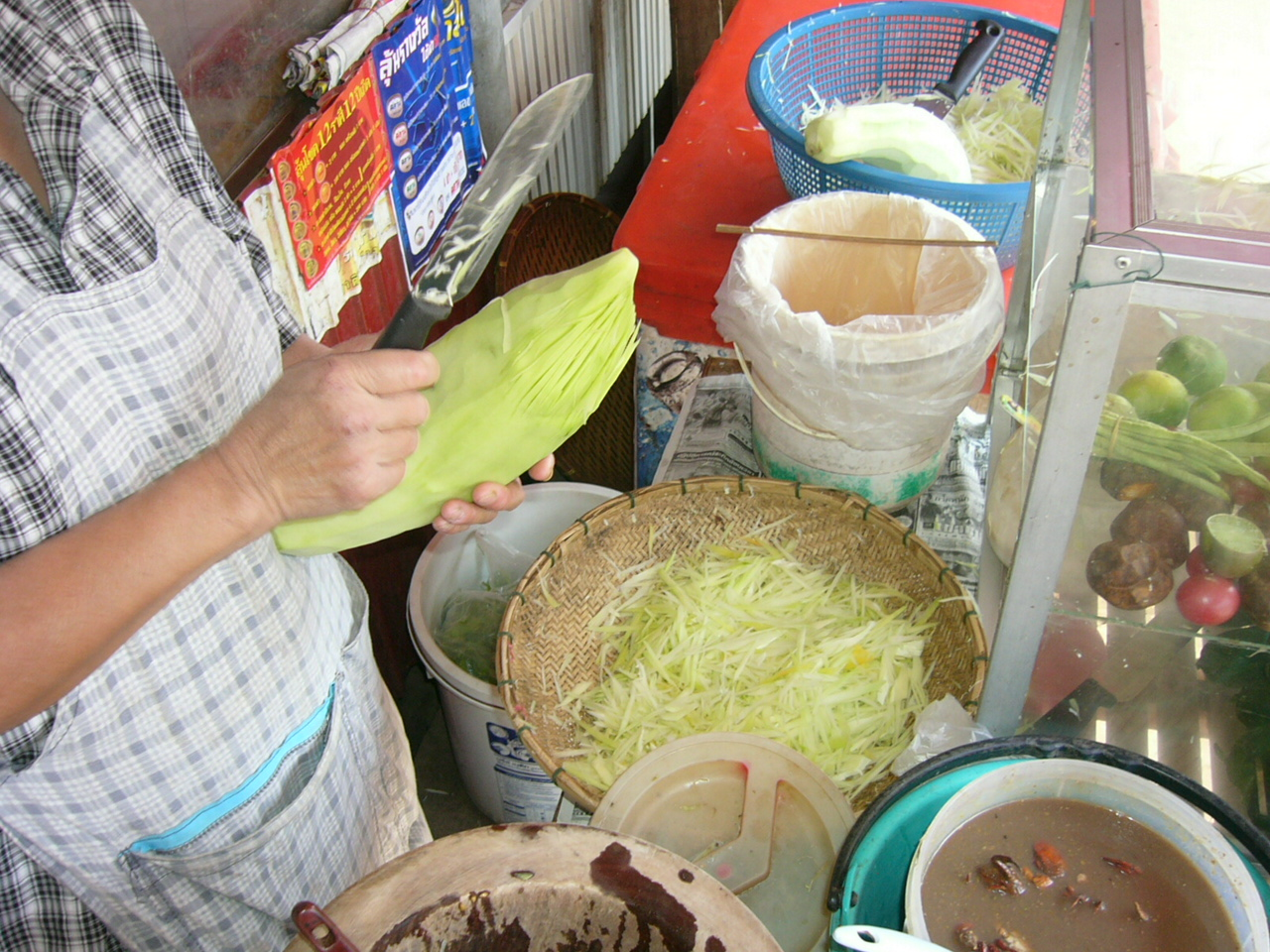
Unripe papaya being sliced into thin strips during preparation of the salad

The dish combines the five main basic tastes: the sourness of the lime, spiciness of the chili, saltiness and savoriness of the fish sauce, and sweetness of palm sugar.

Pounded salads in Laos all fall under the parent category of tam som, which may or may not contain green papaya; when no specific type of tam som is mentioned, it is generally understood to refer to green papaya salad. For absolute clarity, however, the name tam maak hoong may be used, since this name means "pounded papaya".

In Thailand, it is customary for a customer to ask the preparer to make the dish suited to the customer's own tastes. To specifically refer to the original style of papaya salad as prepared in Laos or Isan, it is known as ส้มตำลาว or som tam Lao or simply as tam Lao and the dish as prepared in central Thailand may be referred to as som tam Thai.

Traditionally, the local variety of green papaya salad in the streets of Bangkok is very spicy due to the addition of a fistful of chopped hot bird's eye chili. However, with its rising popularity among tourists, it is now often served less spicy than it used to be in the past.

=== Additional ingredients ===
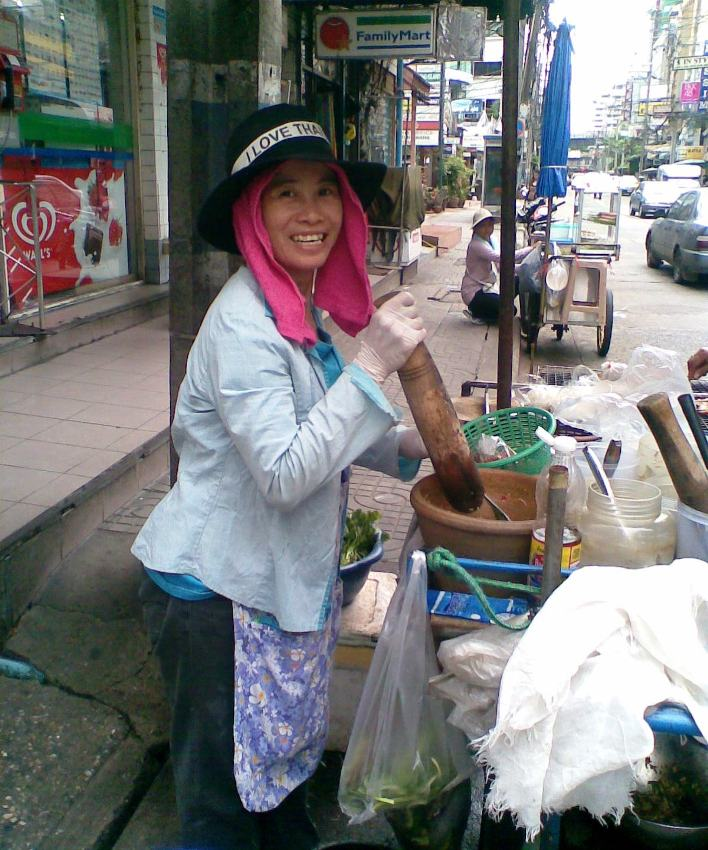
Street vendor from Isan pounding green papaya salad in Bangkok

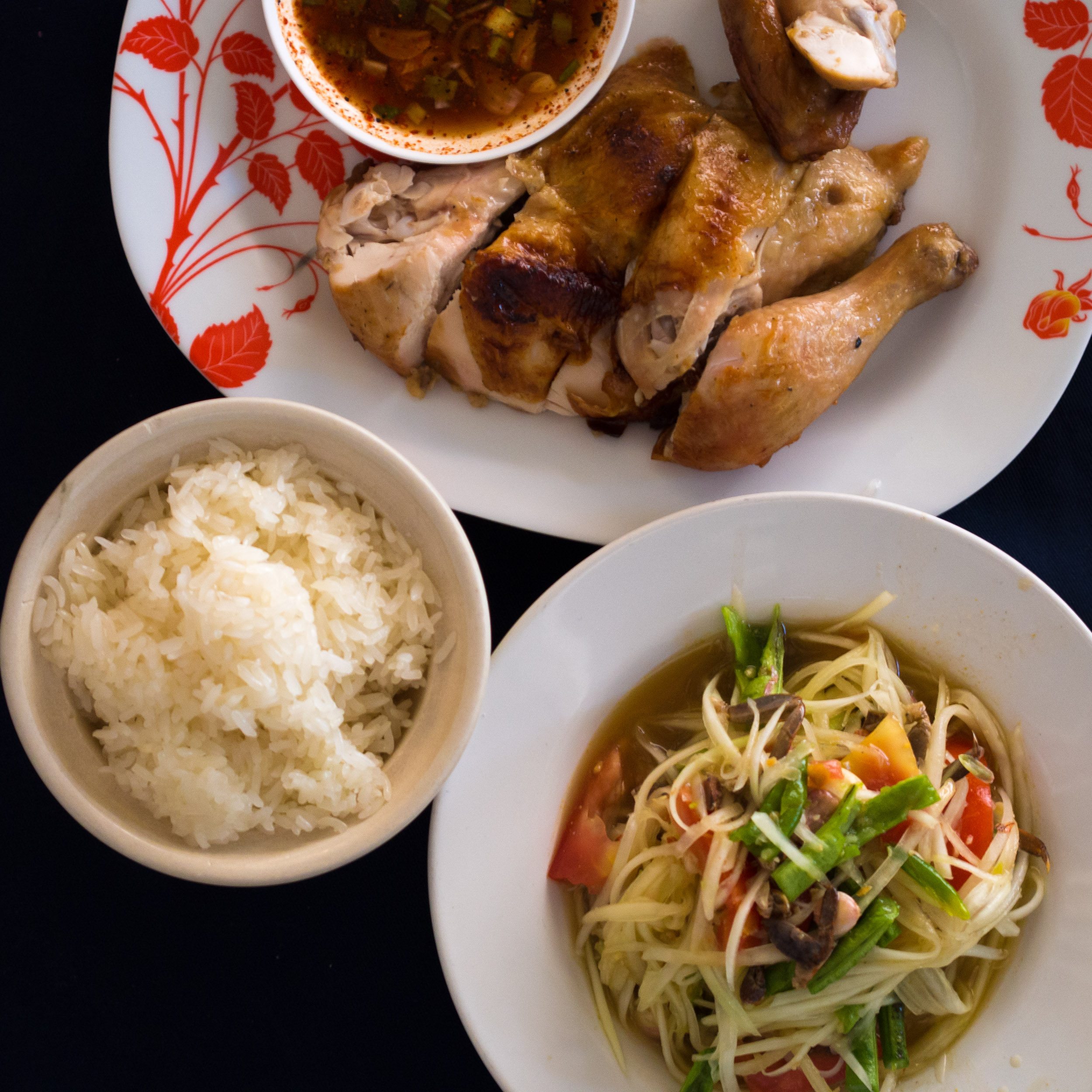
Green papaya salad, grilled chicken and sticky rice is a popular combination in Laos and Thailand.

Together with the papaya, some or most of the following secondary items are added and pounded in the mortar with the pestle:

- Asparagus beans
- Brined "rice field crabs". These belong to the freshwater crab genera Sayamia, Chulathelphusa, and Esanthelphusa (previously classified as part of the genus Somanniathelphusa), which all belong to the Gecarcinucid crab subfamily Parathelphusinae. found in flooded rice fields and canals. Isan people eat the entire crab, including the shell.
- Chili pepper
- Dried shrimp
- Fish sauce
- Garlic
- Monosodium glutamate
- Hog plums
- Lime slice and lime juice
- Palm sugar
- Shrimp paste
- Fish paste
- Raw Thai eggplant
- Cherry or grape tomatoes (green or ripe)

Green papaya salad is often served with glutinous rice and kai yang/ping gai (grilled chicken). It can also be eaten with fresh rice noodles or simply as a snack by itself with, for instance, crispy pork rinds. The dish is often accompanied by raw green vegetables such as water spinach and white cabbage wedges on the side to mitigate the spiciness of the dish.

== Variations ==
A non-spicy green papaya salad version exists in Laos, Vietnam and Thailand, which is much sweeter; it often contains crushed peanuts and is less likely to have fish paste or brined crab. Dried brine shrimp are used in this Central Thai version. There are also versions that make use of unripe mangoes, apples, cucumbers, carrots and other firm vegetables or unripe fruit. Besides using varieties of fruits or vegetables as the main ingredient a popular option is to use vermicelli rice noodles wherein the dish is known as tam sua.

Instead of papaya, other ingredients can be used as the main ingredient. Popular variations in Laos and Thailand include the salad with:

- Cucumber, usually the small variety (tam maak taeng, tam taengkwa)
- Green and unripe mango (tam maak muang, tam mamuang)
- Green and unripe bananas (tam maak kuai, tam kluai)
- Hard and unripe santol (tam krathon)
- Banana flowers (tam hua pli)
- Malay gooseberry (tam mayom)
- Pomelo (tam som o)
- Mu yo sausage (tam mu yo)
- Mixed fruit (tam phonlamai ruam)
- Coconut rice (khao man som tam)
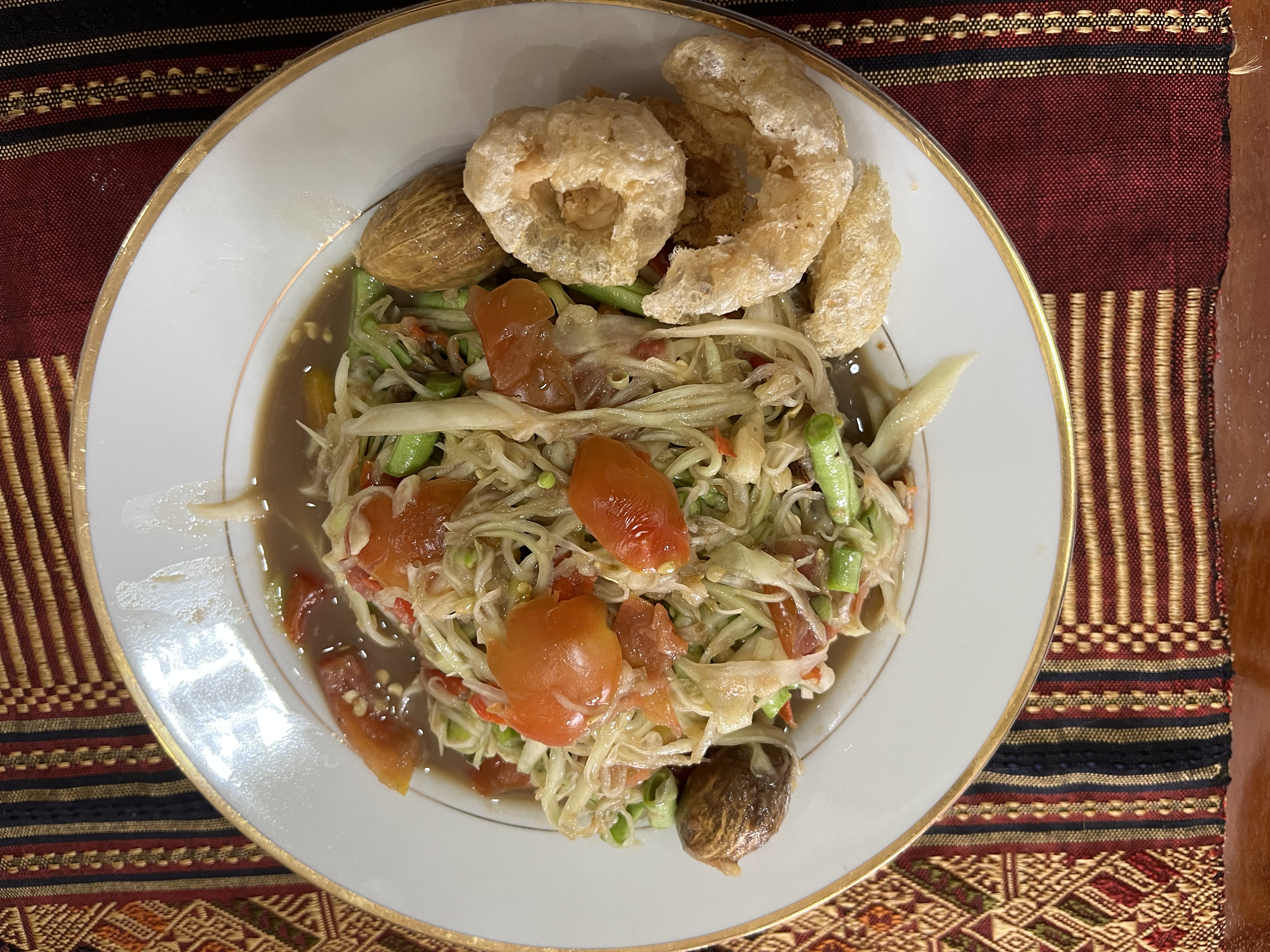
Lao papaya salad with pork rinds

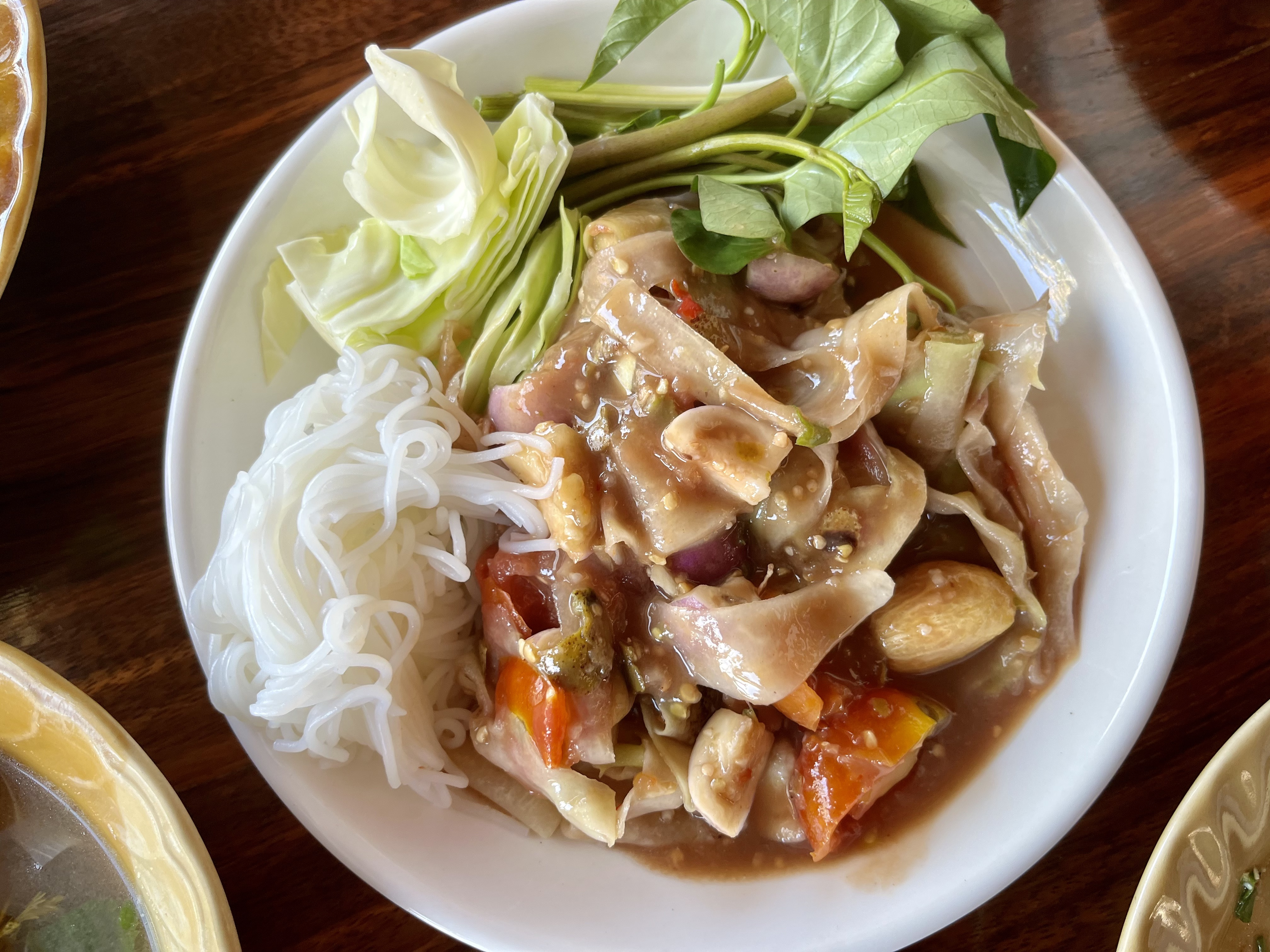
Luang Prabang style Lao papaya salad from Northern Laos

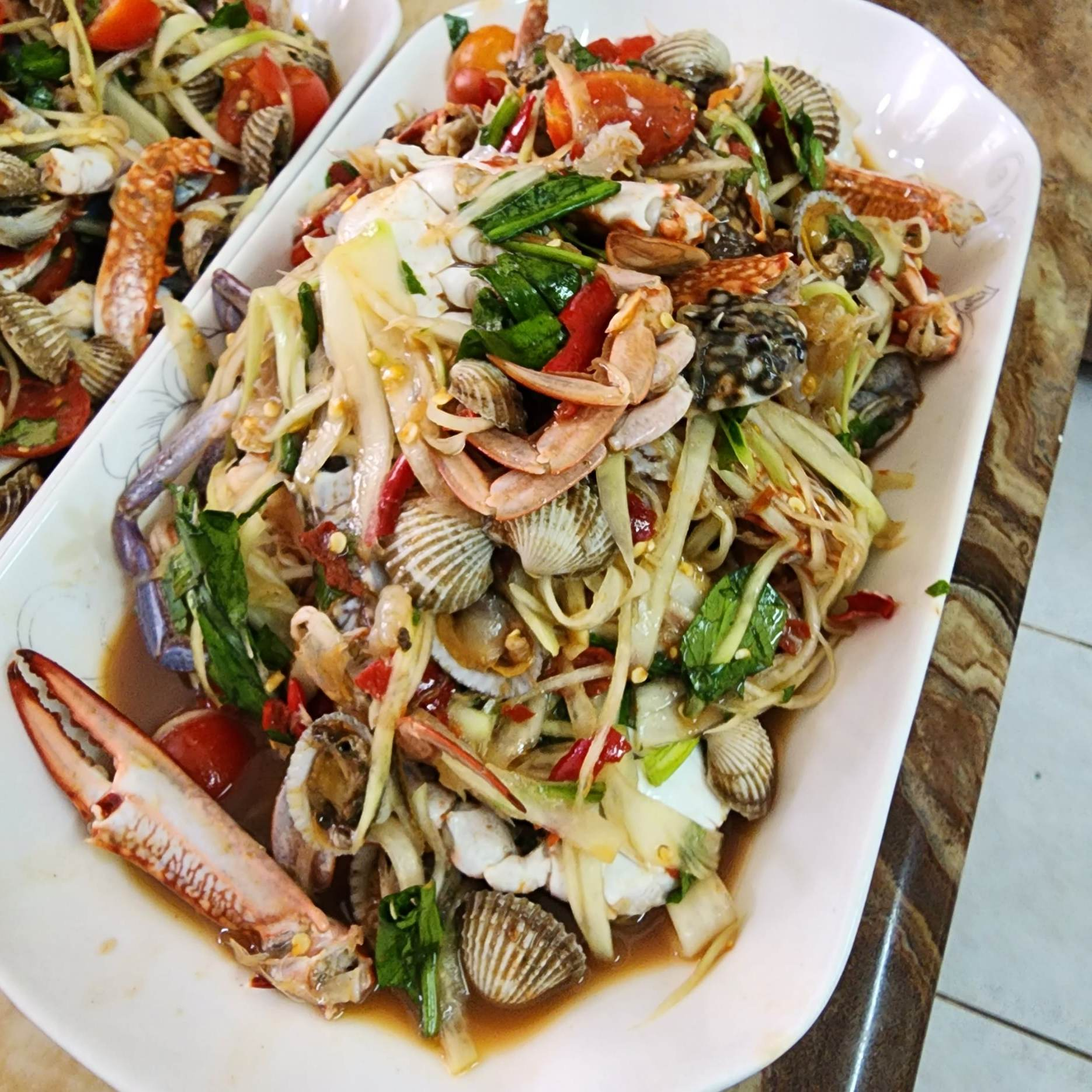
Lao papaya salad with selected crustacea, mollusks, and shellfish in addition to papaya strips

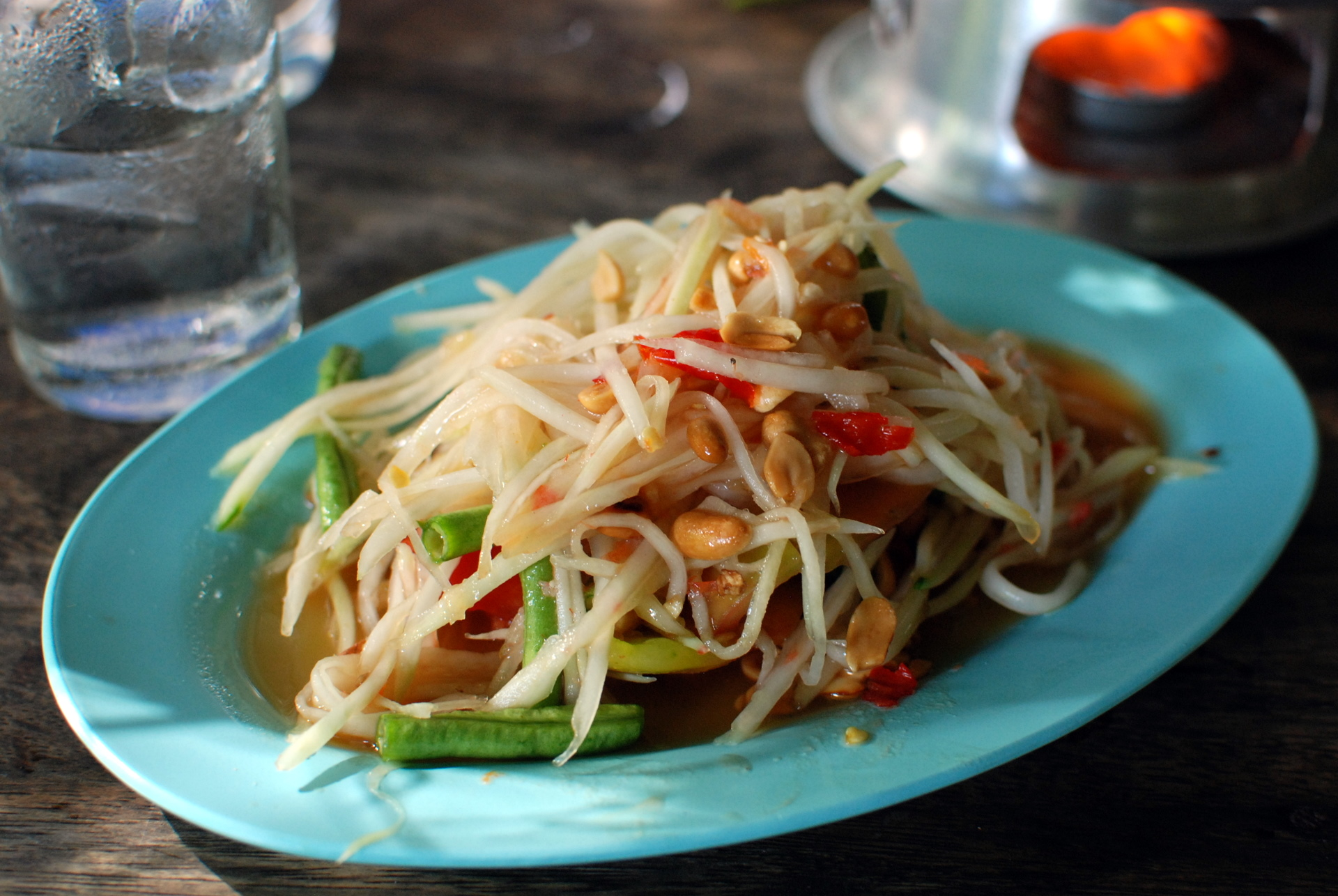
Thai green papaya salad with peanuts

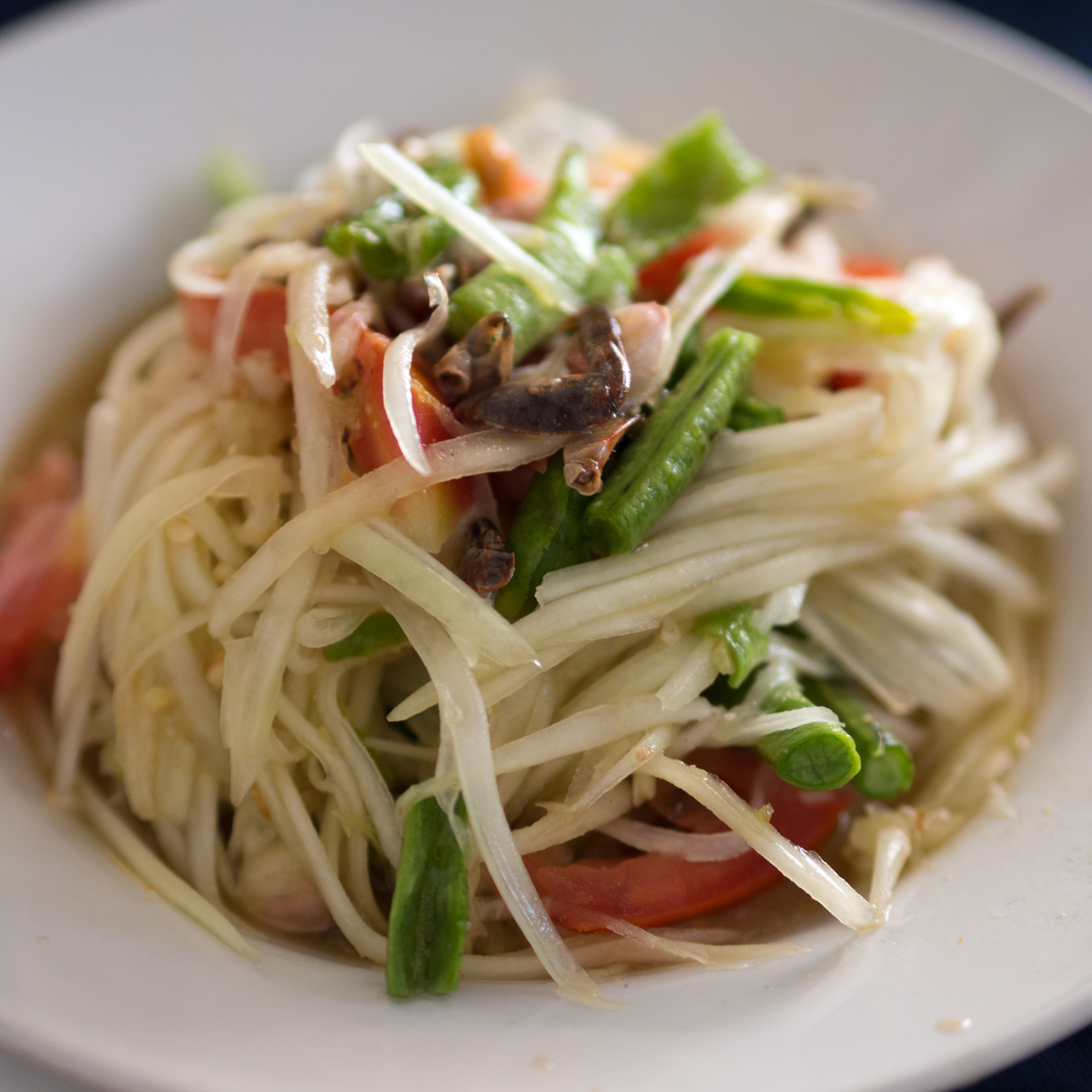
Green papaya salad with brined rice paddy crabs (som tam pu)

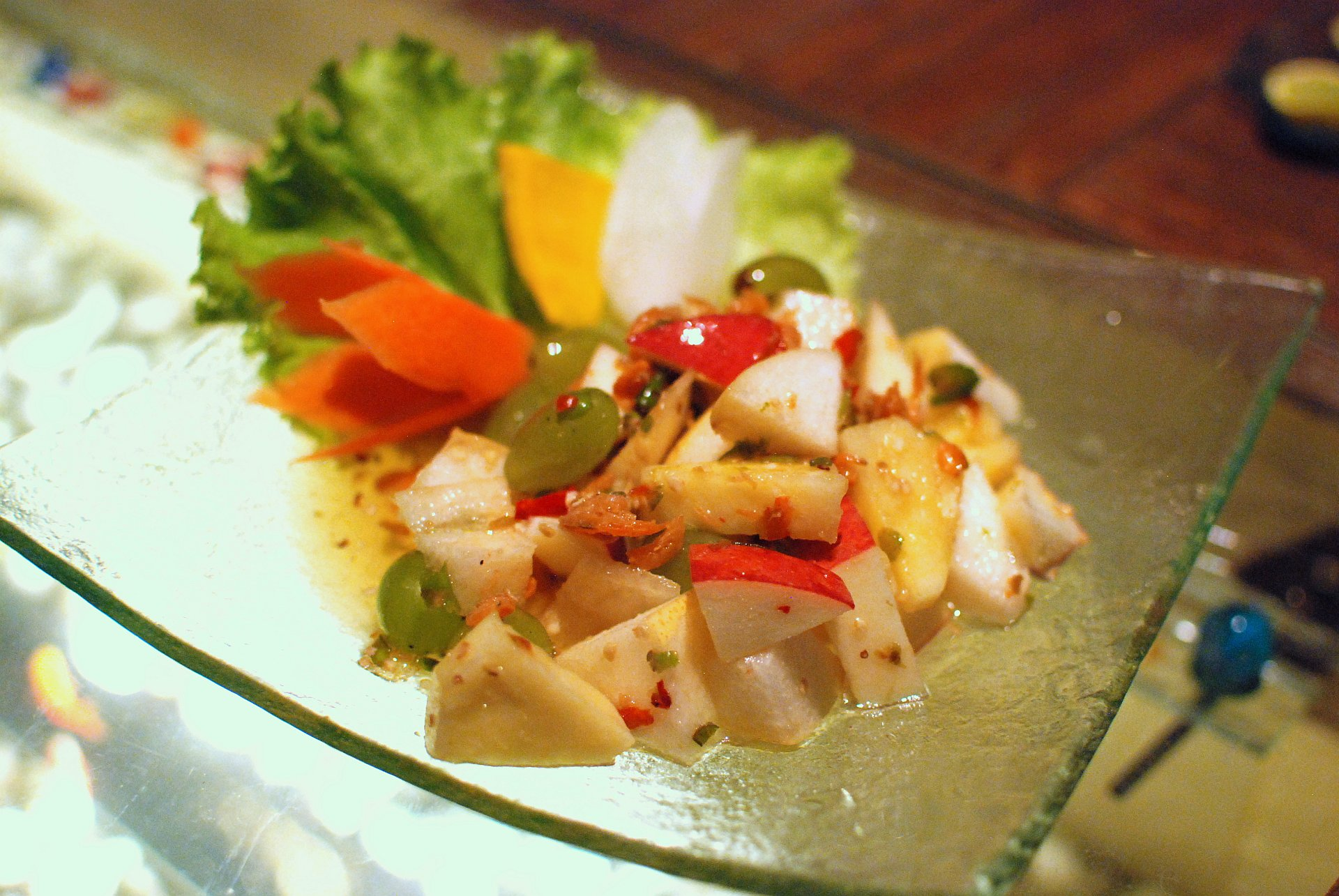
Green papaya salad with mixed fruit (tam phonlamai ruam)

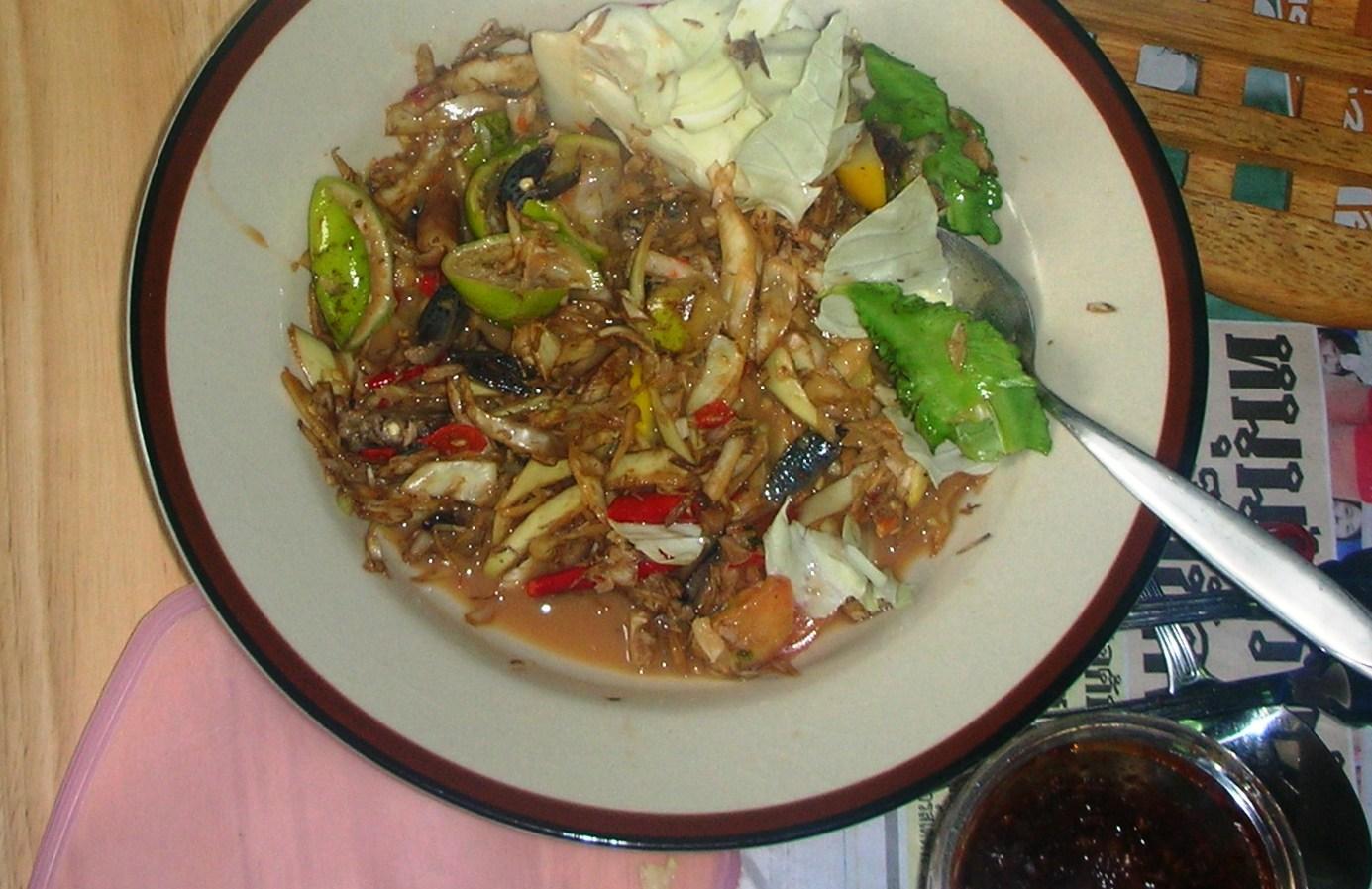
Green papaya salad with banana flowers (tam hua pli)

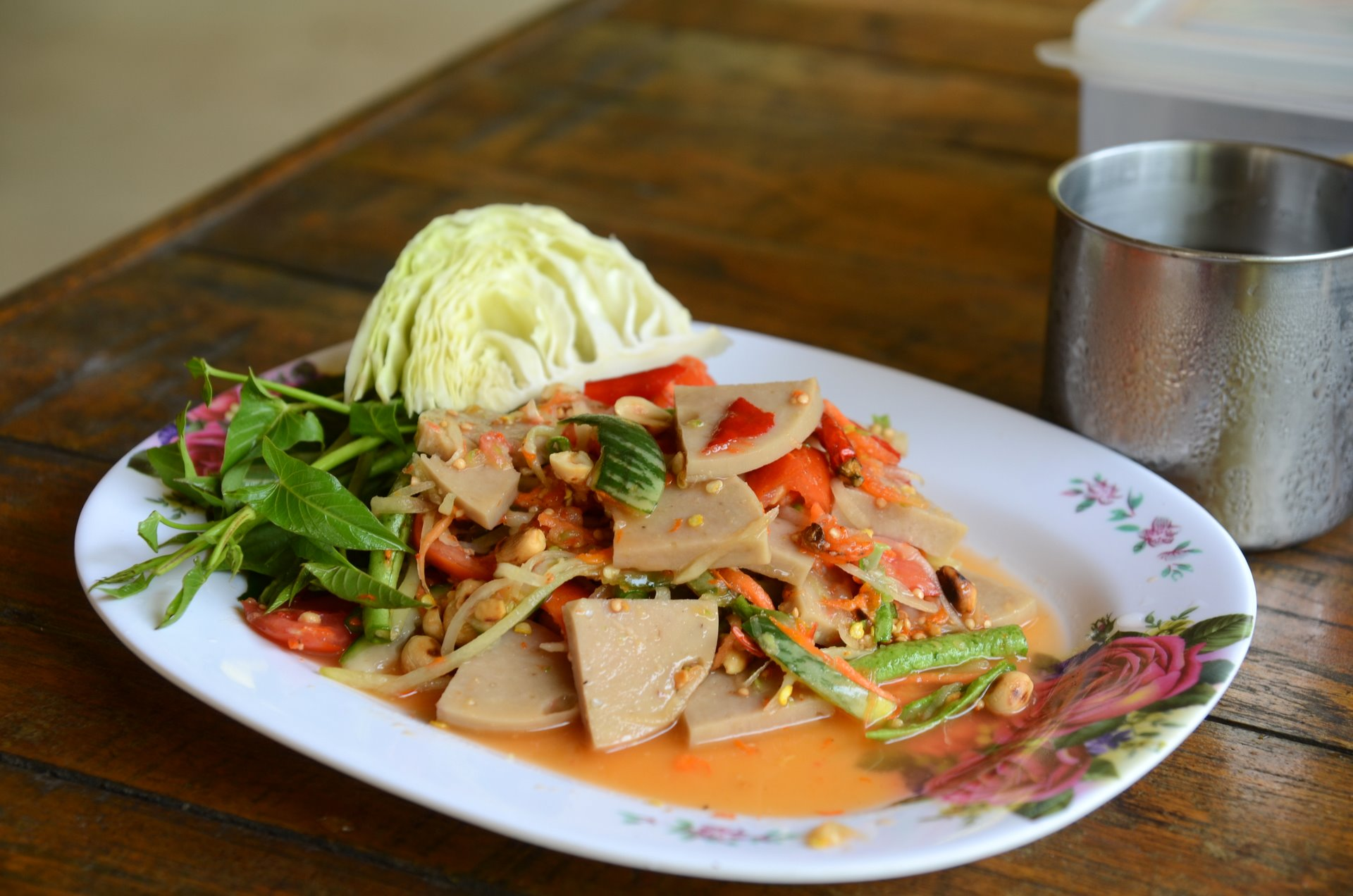
Green papaya salad with mu yo sausage (tam mu yo)

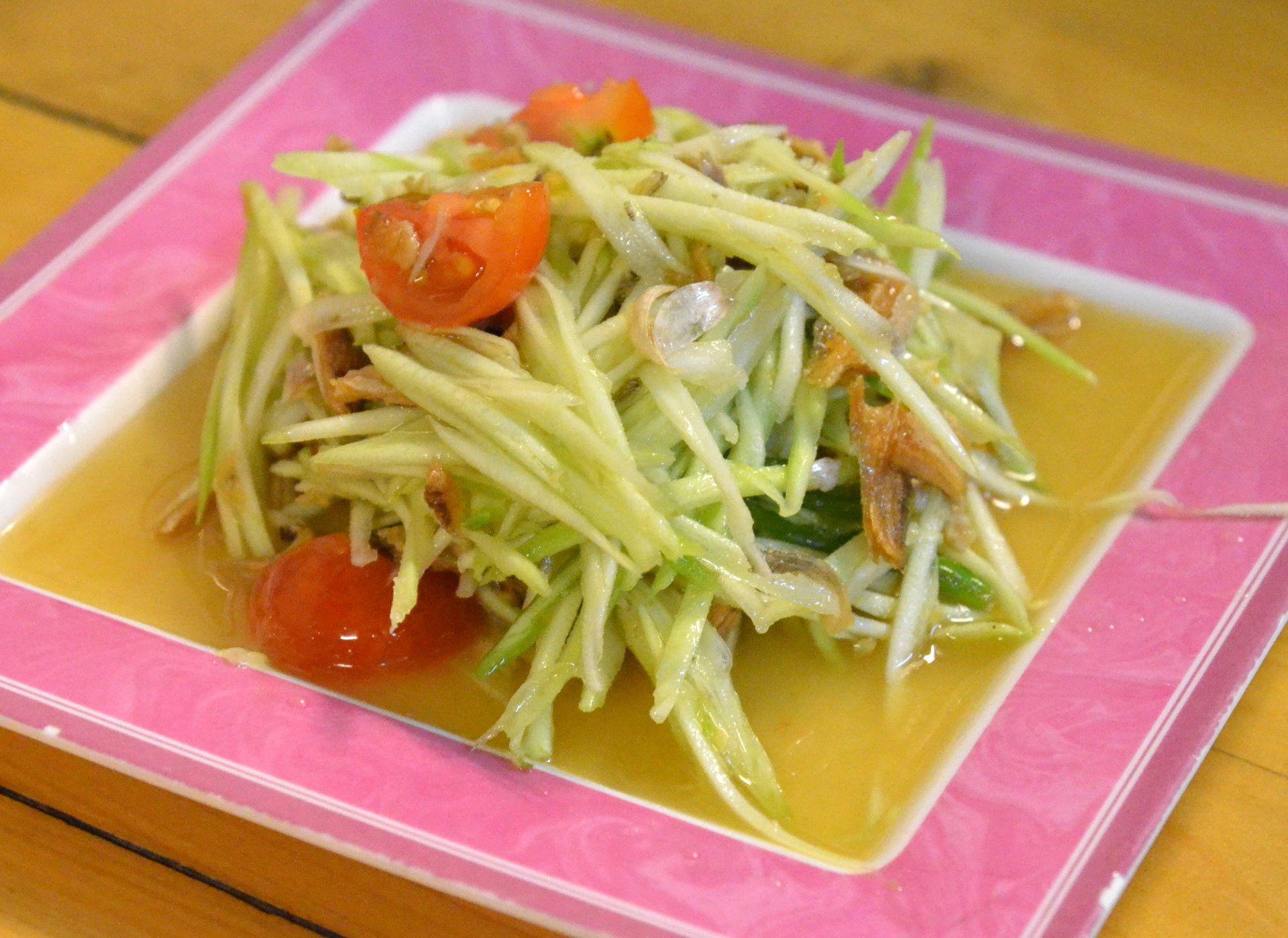
A variation of the salad with green mango instead of papaya and dried anchovies (tam mamuang pla haeng thot)

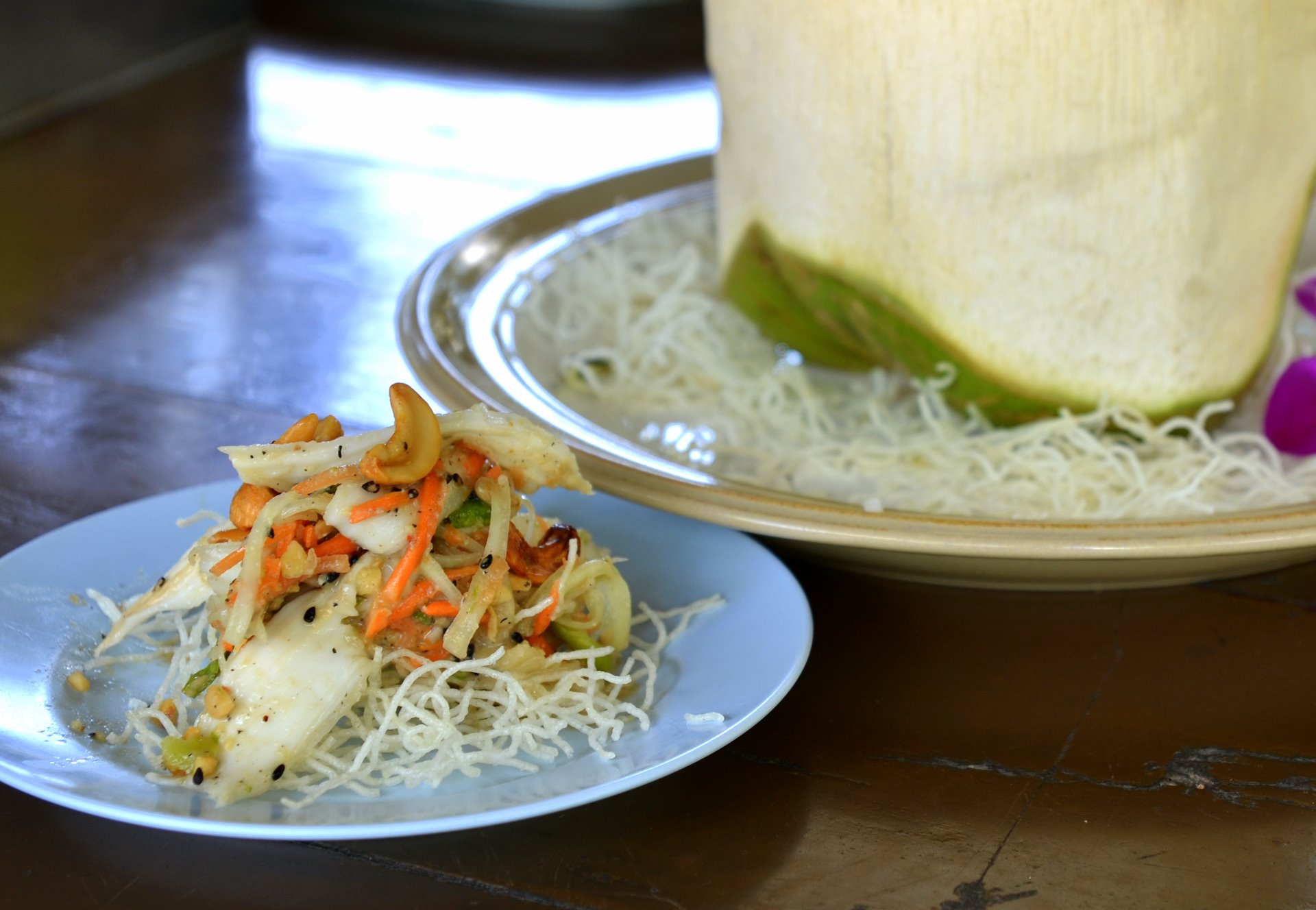
Tam maphrao on sen mi krop: a variation with soft coconut meat and deep-fried rice noodle

== Reception ==
The Thai variation som tam has been listed at number 46 on World's 50 most delicious foods compiled by CNN Go in 2011 and 2018..Som tam was also ranked among the top 24 of the world’s best salads by CNN travel on June 18, 2025.

== See also ==
- List of fruit dishes
- List of salads
- Atchara
