= Sayamia germaini =

Conservation status
- Least Concern (IUCN 3.1)

Scientific classification
- Kingdom: Animalia
- Phylum: Arthropoda
- Class: Malacostraca
- Order: Decapoda
- Suborder: Pleocyemata
- Infraorder: Brachyura
- Family: Gecarcinucidae
- Genus: Sayamia
- Species: S. germaini

Binomial name
- Sayamia germaini (Rathbun, 1902)

Species of crab

Sayamia germaini is a species of freshwater crabs, now moved from the Parathelphusidae to the subfamily Parathelphusinae, found in Thailand, Cambodia and southern Vietnam. This crab is considered an alien invasive species to Taiwan and is included on the list of least concern arthropods.
