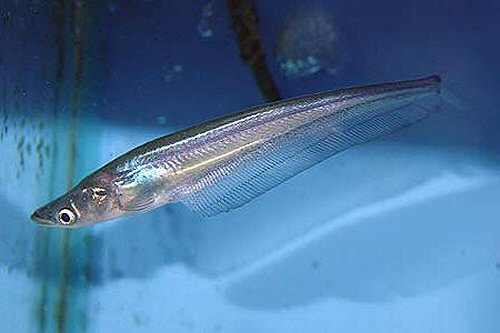
- Juvenile in aquarium

Conservation status
- Least Concern (IUCN 3.1)

Scientific classification
- Kingdom: Animalia
- Phylum: Chordata
- Class: Actinopterygii
- Order: Siluriformes
- Family: Siluridae
- Genus: Phalacronotus
- Species: P. bleekeri

Binomial name
- Phalacronotus bleekeri (Günther, 1864)

Synonyms
- Micronema bleekeri Kryptopterus bleekeri

= Phalacronotus bleekeri =

Species of fish

Phalacronotus bleekeri, commonly known as Bleeker's sheatfish, is a species of catfish of the genus Phalacronotus. This species grows to a length of 60 centimetres (24 in) SL.

This fish is found in mainland Southeast Asia.

== As food ==
In Peninsular Malaysia, Cambodia, Laos, Vietnam and Thailand it is valued as food in the local cuisine for its delicate flesh. In Thailand it is one of the catfish species known in the markets as Pla Nuea On (ปลาเนื้ออ่อน, "sheatfish"). This fish is also often used for making fish balls.

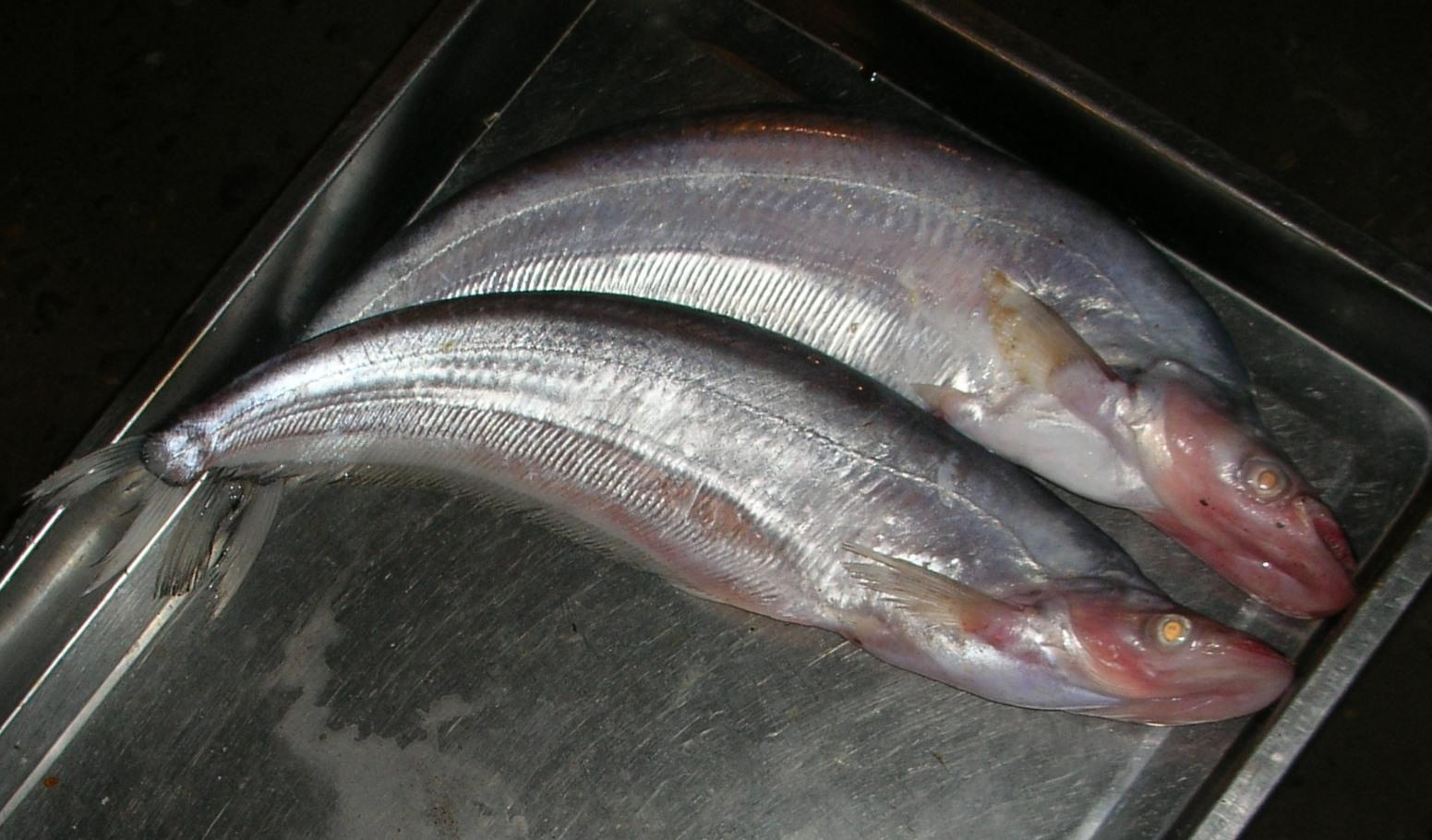
Phalacronotus bleekeri at the market in Chiang Rai, Thailand

== See also ==
- List of Thai ingredients
