= Pla kaphong =

Pla kaphong (Thai: ปลากะพง) may refer to:

- A generic name for Lutjanidae fish species in Thailand
- Barramundi from local fish farms
- Japanese lates
- Nile perch
- Datnioides polota, a tigerfish
