= Sayamia =

Scientific classification
- Domain: Eukaryota
- Kingdom: Animalia
- Phylum: Arthropoda
- Class: Malacostraca
- Order: Decapoda
- Suborder: Pleocyemata
- Infraorder: Brachyura
- Family: Gecarcinucidae
- Genus: Sayamia; Naiyanetr (1994)

Genus of crabs

Sayamia is a genus of freshwater crabs, found in South-East Asia. Three species are included on the list of least concern (lc) arthropods, but S. melanodactylus is endangered.

== Species ==
- Sayamia bangkokensis (Naiyanetr, 1982): Thailand (lc)
- Sayamia germaini (Rathbun, 1902): Cambodia, Thailand, Vietnam (lc)
- Sayamia maehongsonensis (Naiyanetr, 1987): Thailand (VU)
- Sayamia melanodactylus Ng, 1997: Thailand (EN)
- Sayamia sexpunctata (Lanchester, 1906): N. peninsular Malaysia (lc)
