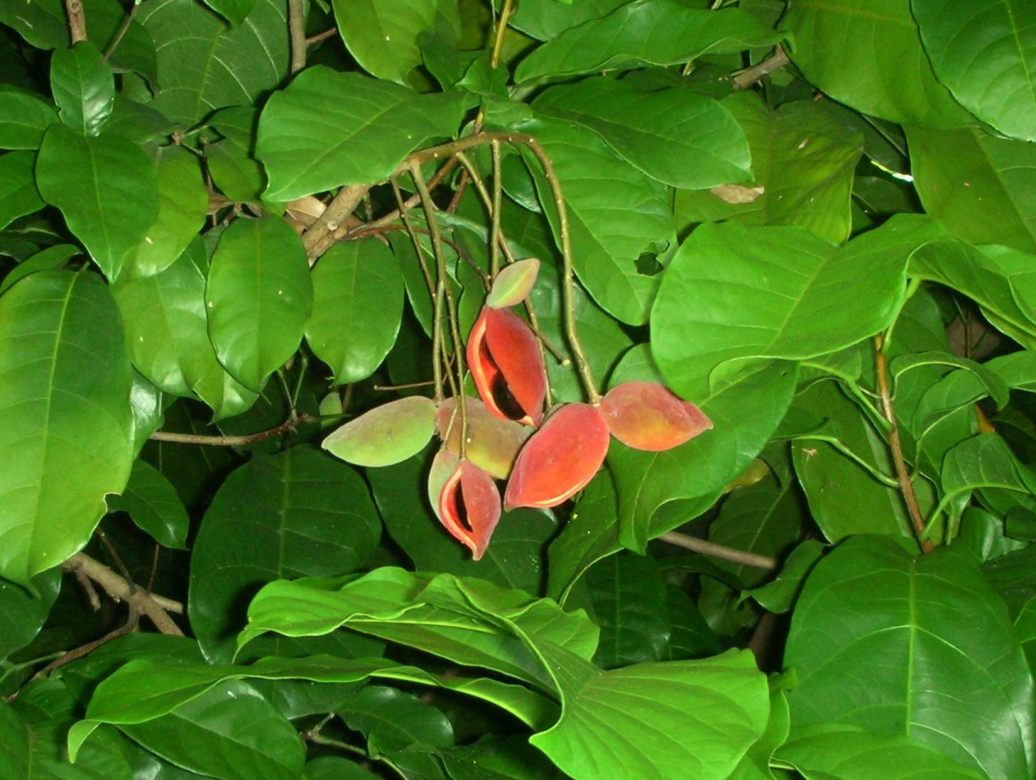

Scientific classification
- Kingdom: Plantae
- Clade: Tracheophytes
- Clade: Angiosperms
- Clade: Eudicots
- Clade: Rosids
- Order: Malvales
- Family: Malvaceae
- Genus: Sterculia
- Species: S. monosperma

Binomial name
- Sterculia monosperma Vent.

Synonyms
- Sterculia nobilis (Salisb.) Sm.

= Sterculia monosperma =

Species of tree

Sterculia monosperma, also known as Chinese chestnut, Thai chestnut, seven sisters' fruit, and phoenix eye fruit, is a deciduous tropical nut-bearing tree of genus Sterculia.

== Distribution ==
Its origin is southern China (Guangdong, Guangxi and Yunnan) and Taiwan, but it is now a common cultivated tree in northern Thailand, northern Vietnam, mountainous areas of Malaysia and Indonesia, as well as northern Laos and Shan State in Burma.

== Human uses ==
The ripe nuts are edible. They may be eaten plain, roasted, boiled with water and salt or also may be used to prepare dishes, such as sauteed chicken.

In China these nuts are one of the traditional foods of the Qixi Festival, the 'night of the seven', also known as the 'anniversary of the seventh sister'. Qixi is celebrated on the seventh day of the seventh lunar month.

The pods containing the nuts have a striking red color when ripe and the nuts are much darker —their husk or pericarpus is almost black— and smaller than the common chestnuts of genus Castanea. The pellicle is brown and smooth and the fruit is yellowish in color.

== Gallery ==
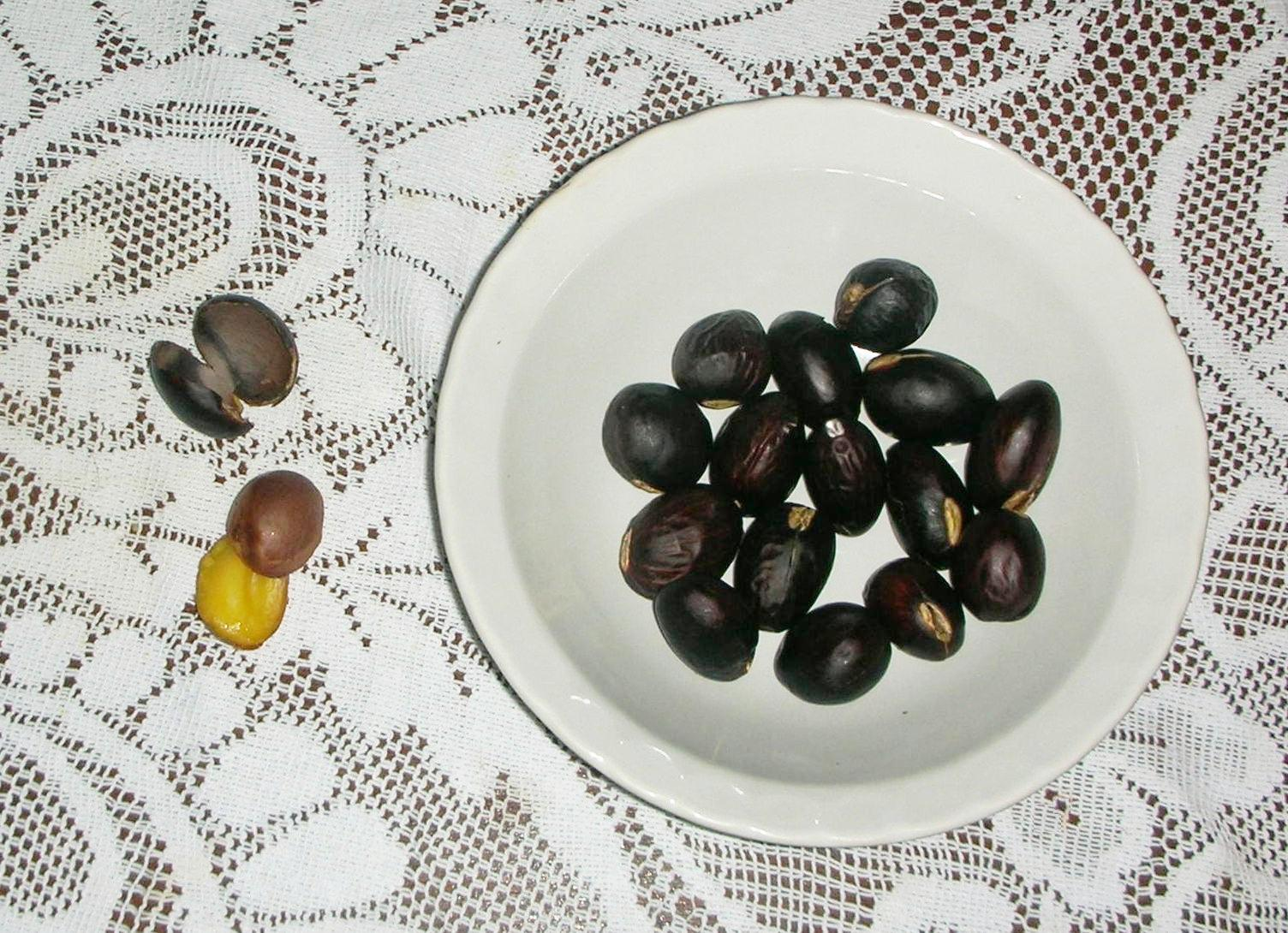
Steamed nuts

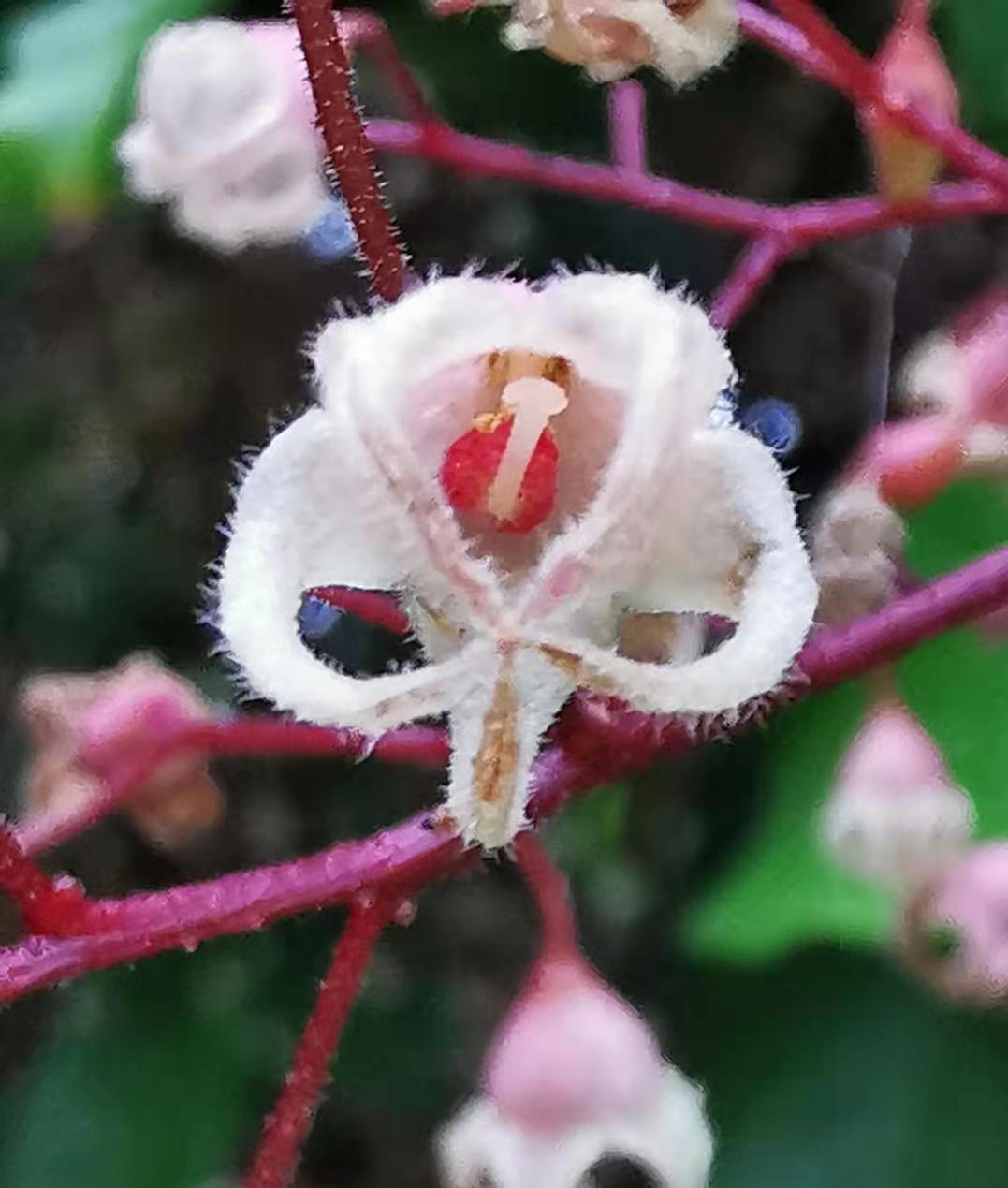
Flower, macro photography.

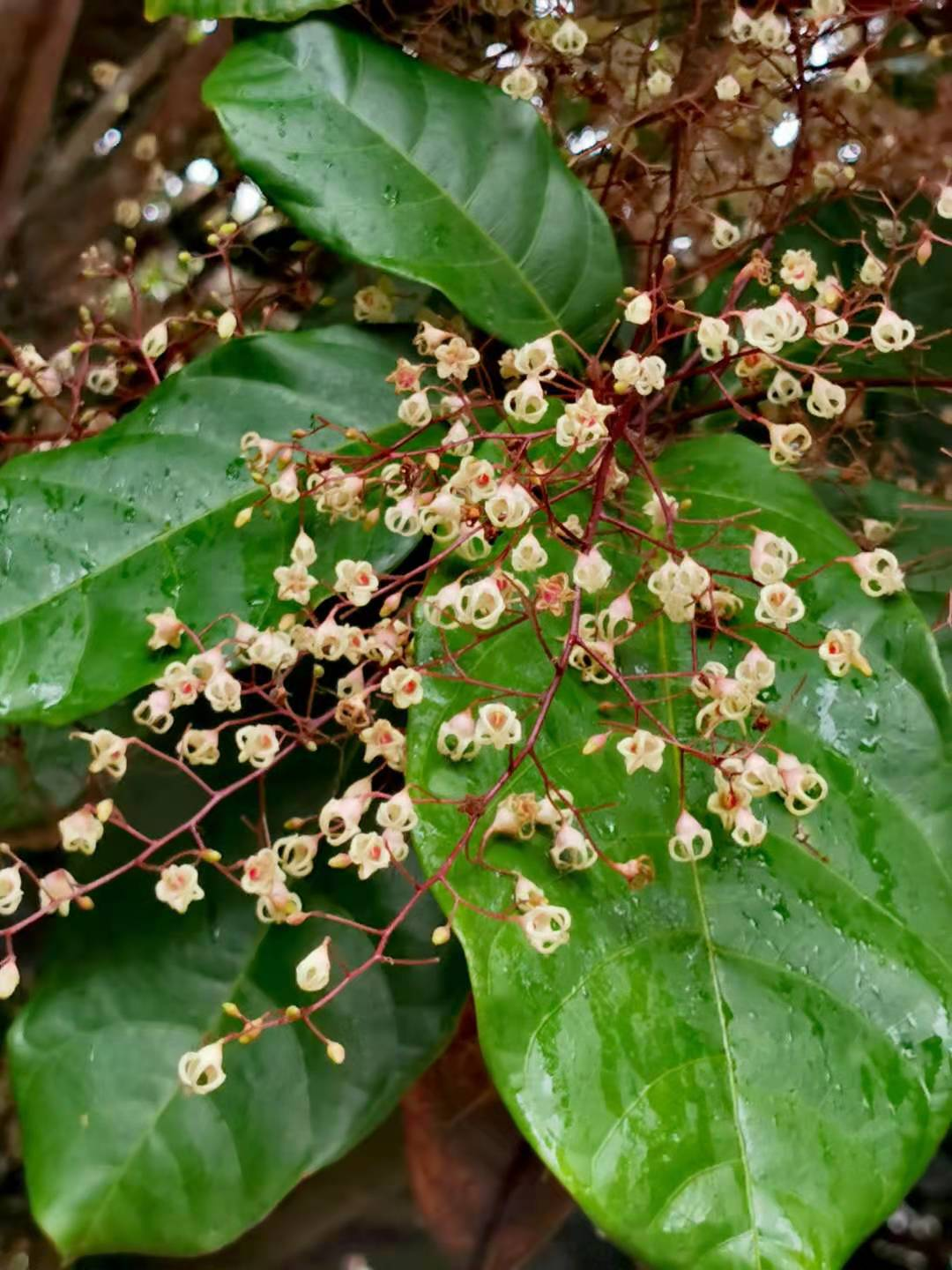
Inflorescence.

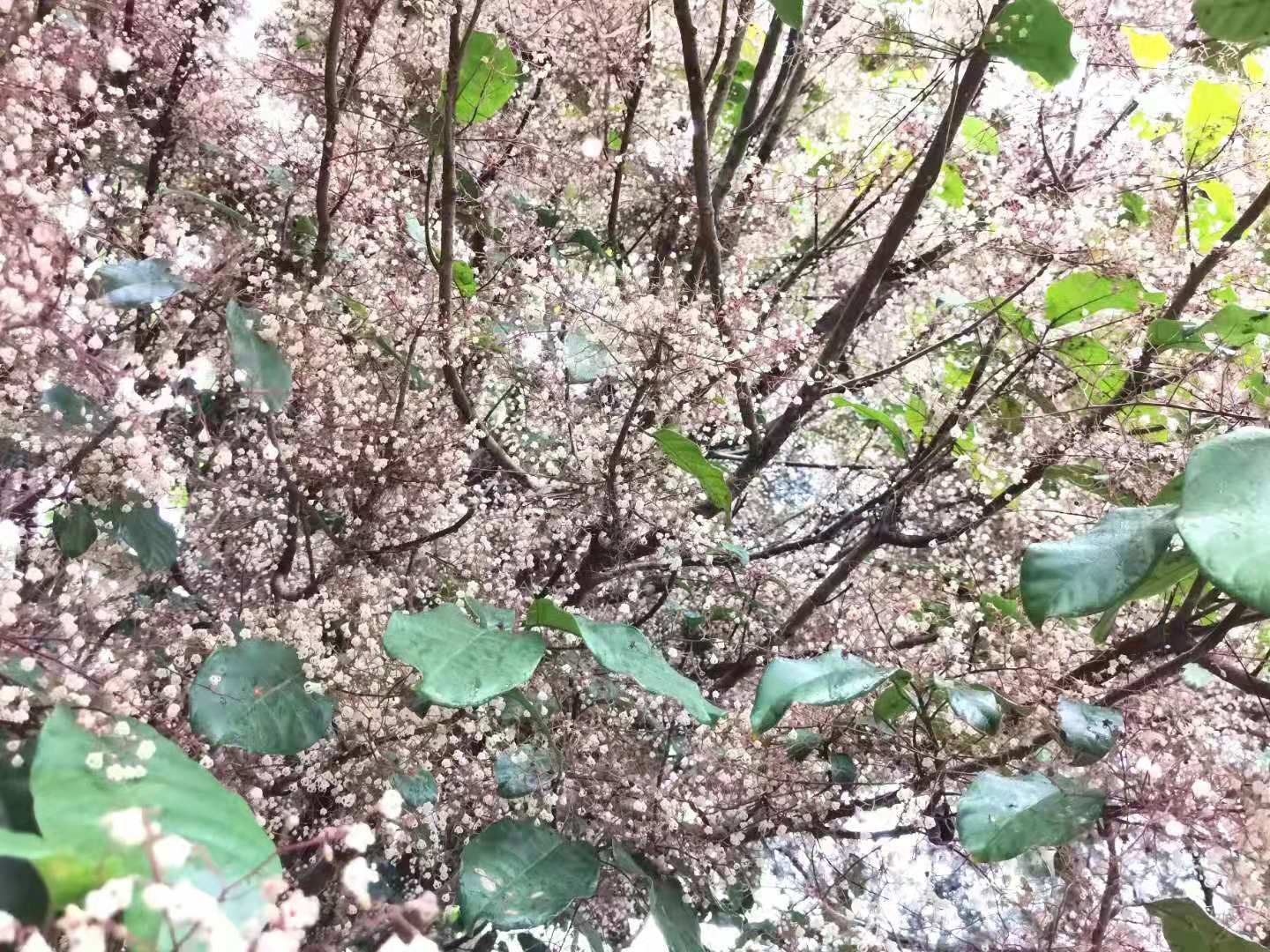
Flowers in full bloom.
