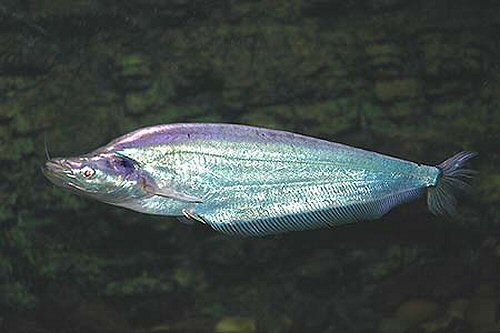

Conservation status
- Least Concern (IUCN 3.1)

Scientific classification
- Kingdom: Animalia
- Phylum: Chordata
- Class: Actinopterygii
- Order: Siluriformes
- Family: Siluridae
- Genus: Phalacronotus
- Species: P. apogon

Binomial name
- Phalacronotus apogon (Bleeker, 1851)

Synonyms
- Silurus apogon

= Phalacronotus apogon =

Species of fish

Phalacronotus apogon is a species of catfish of the genus Phalacronotus found in Southeast Asia. This species grows to a length of 130 centimetres (51 in) SL.

This fish is common in the murky waters of large rivers in the basins of the Mekong and Chao Phraya, as well as in Peninsular Malaysia, Sumatra and Borneo.

The Chainat Freshwater Aquaculture Research and Development Center successfully achieved its first breeding and propagation in October 2025. This was accomplished by injecting hormones to stimulate the parent fish to mate and spawn naturally. The fry from this initial batch were able to be sold in early 2026, and the young fish could immediately feed on commercial feed.

== As food ==
In Thailand it is one of the catfish species known in the markets as Pla nuea on (ปลาเนื้ออ่อน), often used for making fish balls. This fish is highly valued in Thai cuisine for its delicate flesh.

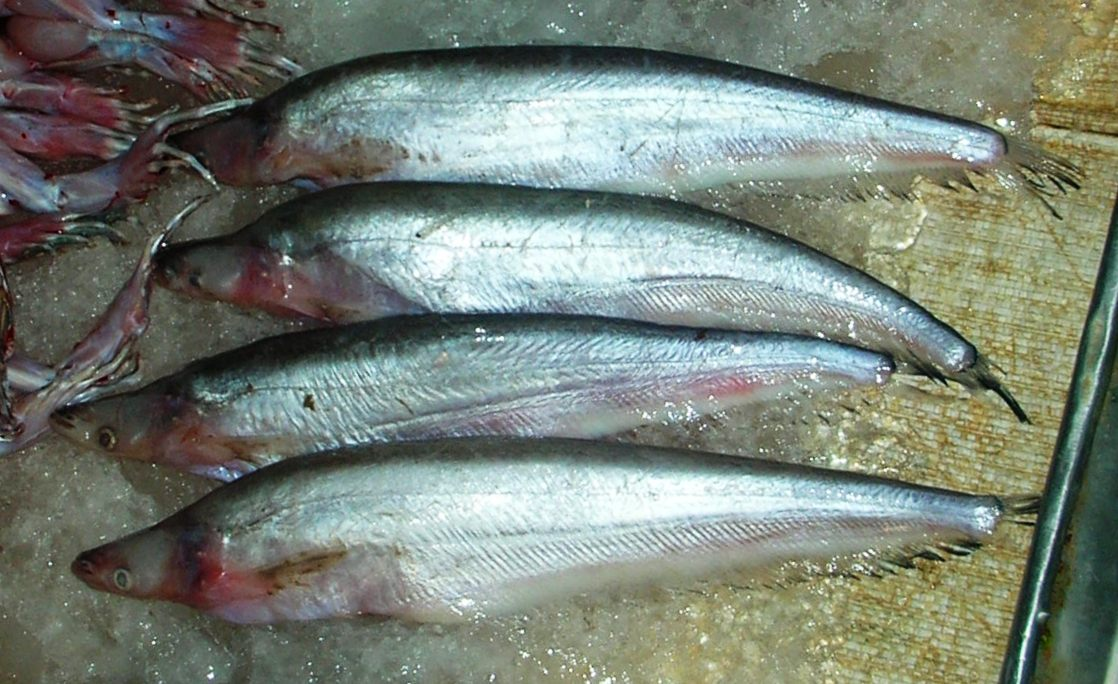
Phalacronotus apogon at the market in Bang rak, Bangkok

== See also ==
- List of Thai ingredients
