= Platytropius siamensis =

Conservation status
- Extinct (1979) (IUCN 3.1)

Scientific classification
- Kingdom: Animalia
- Phylum: Chordata
- Class: Actinopterygii
- Division: Teleostei
- Order: Siluriformes
- Family: Horabagridae
- Genus: †Platytropius
- Species: †P. siamensis

Binomial name
- †Platytropius siamensis (Sauvage, 1883)

Synonyms
- Pseudeutropius siamensis Sauvage, 1883; Nemasiluroides furcatus Fowler, 1937

Species of fish

Platytropius siamensis was a species of schilbid catfish (order Siluriformes) family Schilbeidae. It originated from the Chao Phraya and Bang Pakong Rivers in Thailand. It inhabited lower to middle reaches, mainstreams, tributaries, and larger marshlands. The species has been declared extinct in 2011 by the IUCN Red List, because despite periodic surveys it has not been encountered since 1977–1979.

P. siamensis was carnivorous, feeding on insects and shrimps. This species was oviparous and eggs were unguarded. It could grow to a length of 20.0 cm (7.9 in) TL.

This catfish is known in Thai as Whee Ket (หวีเกศ), which literally means "comb one's hair" The fish was already mentioned in Kap Hae Chom Pla, the famous fish-viewing poem by Prince Thammathibet (Chaofah Kung), dating from the late Ayutthaya period. The poem reads:

Thai	Transcription	English
หวีเกศเพศชื่อปลา คิดสุดาอ่าองค์นาง หวีเกล้าเจ้าสระสาง เส้นเกศสลวยรวยกลิ่นหอม	Whee Ket phet chue pla Kid Sudā ah ong nang Whee klao chao sa sang Sen ket saloi ruai klin hom	Whee Ket, a fish by name It reminds me of a lovely lady, my beloved She combs her hair and arranges it Her long, flowing tresses filled with fragrance

The name Whee Ket refers to its barbels, which resemble the long strands of a woman's hair. The fish has a body shape somewhat resembling a small species of Pangasius, or another member of its family, combined with the long, slender body form of a sheatfish. It has two dorsal-fin sections, with the posterior section reduced to a very small fleshy lobe. Its most distinctive feature is its four pairs of long barbels, which are flattened rather than thread-like.

Today, only two preserved specimens are known to remain, one at the Department of Fisheries' aquarium collection and the other at the Smithsonian Institution. In 1994, ichthyologists Chavalit Vidthayanon and Kittipong Jaruthanin conducted a survey of the Bang Pakong River, focusing on the area where the boundaries of three provinces—Chachoengsao, Prachin Buri, and Nakhon Nayok—meet. They failed to find the fish, despite having received reports from local fishermen of a fish resembling the species. Following examination of these reports, the researchers believed that the fish encountered by the fishermen was more likely Pangasius elongatus rather than.
