= Bumblebee catfish =

Bumblebee catfish may refer to the entire family Pseudopimelodidae. Many species of Pseudomystus may be referred to as bumblebee catfish or false bumblebee catfish. This name may also refer to a number of different catfish species with colouration reminiscent of that of a bumblebee:

- African bumblebee catfish, Microsynodontis batesii Boulenger, 1903
- Asian bumblebee catfish, Pseudomystus siamensis
- Bumblebee jelly catfish, Batrochoglanis raninus
- Giant bumblebee catfish, Pseudopimelodus bufonius
- False bumblebee catfish, an undescribed species similar to Pseudomystus stenomus
- Mottled bumblebee catfish, an undescribed species similar to Pseudomystus leiacanthus
- South American bumblebee catfish, Microglanis iheringi A. L. Gomes, 1946
