= Cruciglanis =

Scientific classification
- Kingdom: Animalia
- Phylum: Chordata
- Class: Actinopterygii
- Order: Siluriformes
- Family: Pseudopimelodidae
- Genus: Cruciglanis; Ortega-Lara & Lehmann A., 2006
- Species: C. pacifici

Binomial name
- Cruciglanis pacifici Ortega-Lara & Lehmann A., 2006

Genus of fishes

Cruciglanis is a genus of catfish (order Siluriformes) of the family Pseudopimelodidae. It contains a single recognized species, Cruciglanis pacifici.

== Taxonomy ==
Cruciglanis pacifici was described with the genus Cruciglanis in 2006. The genus Cruciglanis has a sister group relationship to Batrochoglanis and Microglanis.

== Distribution ==
The distribution of C. pacifici includes the San Cipriano River of the Dagua River basin, the Anchicayá, Aguaclara, and Danubio Rivers of the Anchicayá River basin, and western slope of the Pacific versant of the Valle del Cauca Department, Colombia.

== Description ==
C. pacifici reaches about 11 cm (4.3 in) SL. These fish have small eyes, wide mouths, and three pairs of barbels. These fish have serrae on their dorsal and pectoral fin spines. Dorsal region of the head, lateral surface of body, and adipose fin are brown, and the ventral region cream (beige) with some brown spots. There are four dark brown vertical marks on sides.

== Ecology ==
This species is found in riffles and runs of undisturbed clear and shallow rivers in strong current and on gravel to small stone substrates. C. pacifici generally shares its microhabitat with other species of fishes like Gobiesox sp., Chaetostoma marginatum, Cordilancistrus daguae, Astroblepus trifasciatus, and Trichomycterus taenia, as well as shrimps (Atya). The stomach contents have shown immature aquatic insects belonging to Trichoptera, Diptera, Ephemeroptera and Odonata, and terrestrial insects of the orders Hymenoptera and Coleoptera.
