= P. mitchelli =

P. mitchelli may refer to:

- Platysaurus mitchelli, the Mitchell's flat lizard, a lizard species found in Malawi
- Pseudeutropius mitchelli, an endemic fish species found in India in the genus Pseudeutropius
- Pseudocellus mitchelli, a hooded tickspider species found in Mexico

== See also ==
- Mitchelli (disambiguation)
