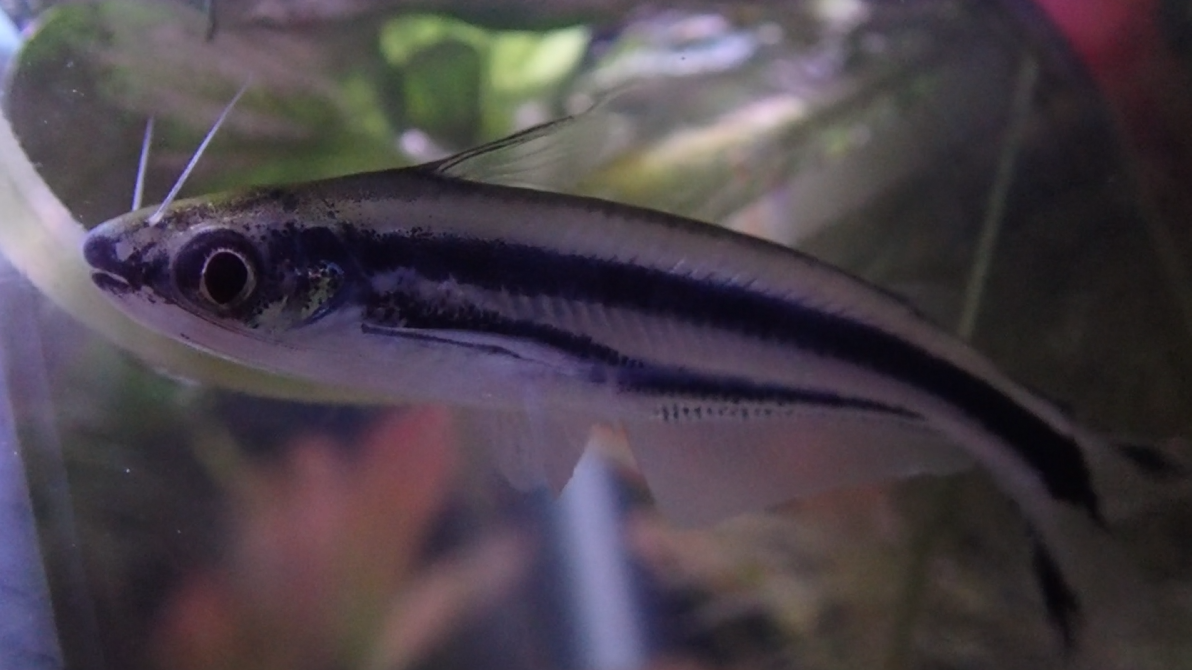

Conservation status
- Least Concern (IUCN 3.1)

Scientific classification
- Kingdom: Animalia
- Phylum: Chordata
- Class: Actinopterygii
- Order: Siluriformes
- Family: Schilbeidae
- Genus: Pareutropius
- Species: P. buffei

Binomial name
- Pareutropius buffei (Gras, 1961)

Synonyms
- Eutropiellus buffei Gras, 1961; Eutropiellus vandeweyeri (Thys van den Audenaerde, 1964); Eutropius buffei (Gras, 1961)

= Pareutropius buffei =

Species of fish

Pareutropius buffei, the three-striped African catfish, is a species of fish in the family Schilbeidae, the schilbid catfishes.

== Taxonomy ==
This fish was originally classified as Eutropiellus buffei, named after a Mr. Buffe, the director of the water and forest service of Dahomey at the time. It was later placed into the genus Pareutropius.

== Description ==
The species reaches a maximum total length of 16.9 centimetres (6.7 in) and maximum weight of 28.8 grams (1.02 oz). This species has between 8–9 branchiostegal rays. The dorsal fin has 2 spiny rays and 5 soft branching rays, while the pectoral fins have 1 spiny ray and 7–8 soft branching rays. The pelvic fins have 6 soft rays, 5 of which are branched. The anal fin has between 36–40 soft rays, with 4 of those being unbranched.

The body is silvery, with three lateral stripes on each side, and there are black spots on the upper and lower parts of the caudal fin. This species is sometimes kept as an aquarium pet.

== Distribution and habitat ==
It is native to Nigeria, Niger, Mali, Benin and Guinea, where it inhabits rivers and freshwater lagoons.
