= Diplomystes cuyanus =

Scientific classification
- Kingdom: Animalia
- Phylum: Chordata
- Class: Actinopterygii
- Order: Siluriformes
- Family: Diplomystidae
- Genus: Diplomystes
- Species: D. cuyanus

Binomial name
- Diplomystes cuyanus Ringuelet, 1965

Synonyms
- Olivaichthys cuyanus (Ringuelet, 1965)

Species of fish

Diplomystes cuyanus is a species of freshwater ray-finned fish belonging to the family Diplomystidae, the velvet catfishes. This fish is endemic to Argentina where it is found in the Colorado River and tributaries as well as the Desaguadero-Salado basin. It grows to a standard length of 21.8 cm (8.6 in).
