= Microglanis leptostriatus =

Scientific classification
- Domain: Eukaryota
- Kingdom: Animalia
- Phylum: Chordata
- Class: Actinopterygii
- Order: Siluriformes
- Family: Pseudopimelodidae
- Genus: Microglanis
- Species: M. leptostriatus

Binomial name
- Microglanis leptostriatus Mori & Shibatta, 2006

Species of fish

Microglanis leptostriatus is a species of catfish belonging to the family Pseudopimelodidae. It appears to be entirely restricted to the middle and upper basin of the São Francisco River in Brazil.

This species is small (up to 4.23 centimetres (1.67 in) standard length) but boldly patterned. Its most distinctive feature is a narrow, sinuous pale band running across the top of the otherwise dark head. the rest of the body is marked with pale and dark blotches, though overall it appears darker than many of its congeners as some of the light areas are mottled with darker spots.
