= Diplomystes camposensis =

Conservation status
- Vulnerable (IUCN 3.1)

Scientific classification
- Kingdom: Animalia
- Phylum: Chordata
- Class: Actinopterygii
- Order: Siluriformes
- Family: Diplomystidae
- Genus: Diplomystes
- Species: D. camposensis

Binomial name
- Diplomystes camposensis Arratia, 1987

Species of fish

Diplomystes camposensis is a species of freshwater ray-finned fish belonging to the family Diplomystidae, the velvet catfishes. This fish is endemic to Chile.

== Taxonomy ==
Diplomystes camposensis was first formally described in 1987 by the Chilean ichthyologist and paleontologist María Gloria Eliana Arratia Fuentes with its type locality given as Riñihue Lake in Valdivia in Chile. This species is classified in the genus Diplomystes which is the only genus in the monotypic family Diplomystidae, the velvet catfishes, which is, in turn, the only family in the monotypic suborder Diplomystoidei within the catfish order Siluriformes.

== Etymology ==
Diplomystes camposensis is a species in the genus Diplomystes which is a compound of diplóos or diploū́s, meaning "twofold" or "double", and mystus, which means "moustache", an allusion to the two large barbels on upper lip of Arius papillosus. This was originally coined as a French vernacular name, Diplomyste, by André Marie Constant Duméril in 1856. The specific name, camposensis, adds the Latin suffix -ensis, denoting place, onto the surname Campos, this is in honour of the Chilean ichthyologist Hugo Campos, who encouraged Arratia to study the velevet catfishes.

== Description ==
Diplomystes camposensis is uniform dark brown or dark purple on the back and sides and it may have irregular spots. It is yellowish, orangish or whitish ventrally in fresh specimens. This species reaches a total length of 25 cm (9.8 in).

== Distribution ==
Diplomystes camposensis is endemicto Chile where it is found in the usptream and middle reaches of both the Valdivia River and Tolten River basins.
