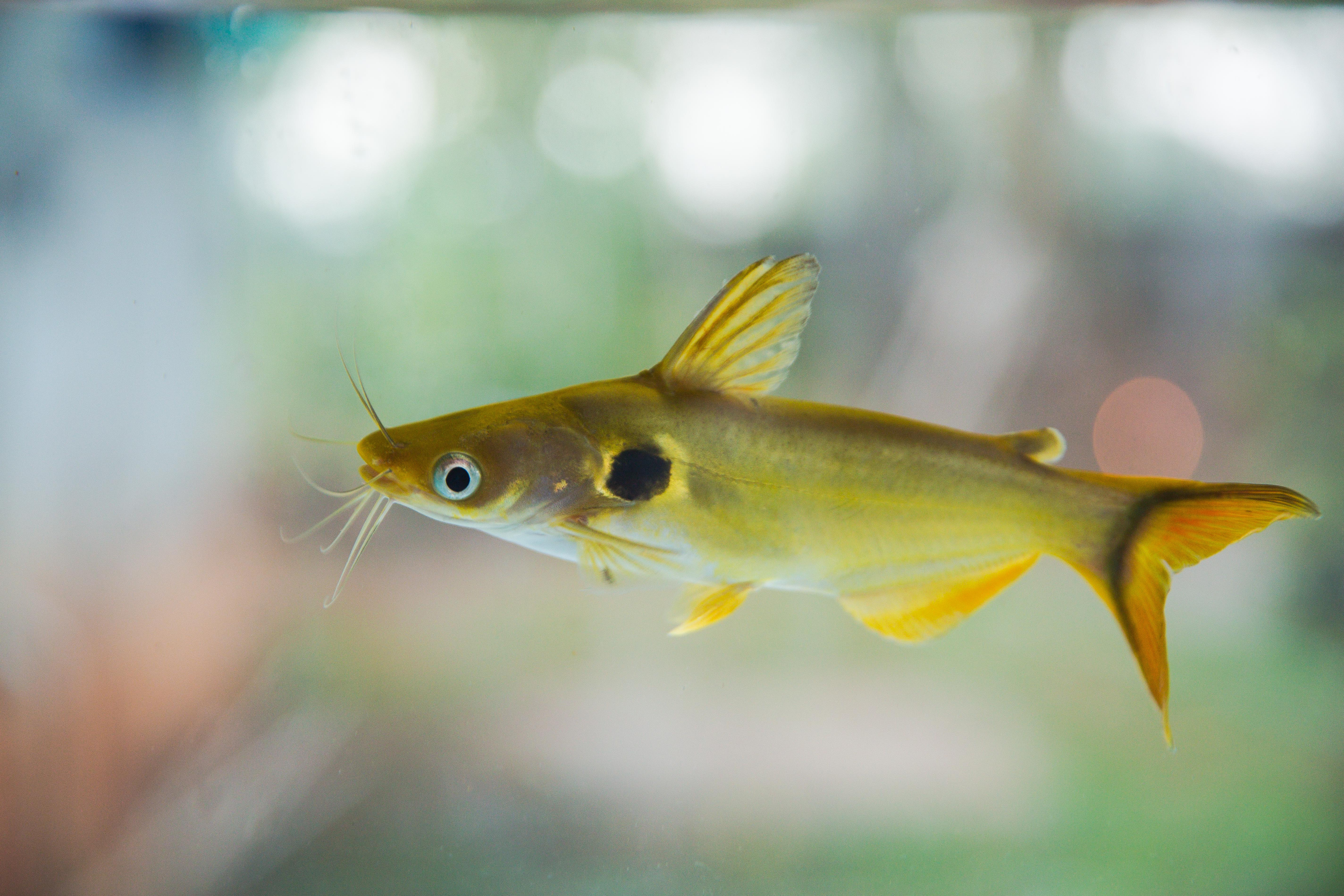

Conservation status
- Vulnerable (IUCN 3.1)

Scientific classification
- Kingdom: Animalia
- Phylum: Chordata
- Class: Actinopterygii
- Division: Teleostei
- Order: Siluriformes
- Family: Horabagridae
- Genus: Horabagrus
- Species: H. brachysoma

Binomial name
- Horabagrus brachysoma (Günther, 1864)

Synonyms
- List: Horabagrus melanosoma Plamoottil & Abraham, 2013; Macrones chryseus Day, 1865; Mystus chryseus Day, 1865; Pseudobagrus brachysoma Günther, 1864; Pseudobagrus chryseus Day, 1865

= Horabagrus brachysoma =

Yellow catfish

Species of fish

Horabagrus brachysoma is a species of catfish endemic to rivers in the Western Ghats of India. It is known as mannjakoori in its native range, and has a host of English common names, such as sun catfish, Günther's catfish, yellow catfish, eclipse catfish, bullseye catfish, golden red tail catfish, and solar catfish.

== Description ==
Horabagrus brachysoma has a large head and a wide, subterminal mouth; the eyes are large and can be seen from below the fish. There are four pairs of barbels, one nasal, one maxillary, and two mandibular. The body is yellowish, with a black shoulder spot surrounded by a lighter outline. The dorsal fin has one spine and from 5 to 7 rays, and there is an adipose fin. It may reach 45 cm (18 in) in TL.

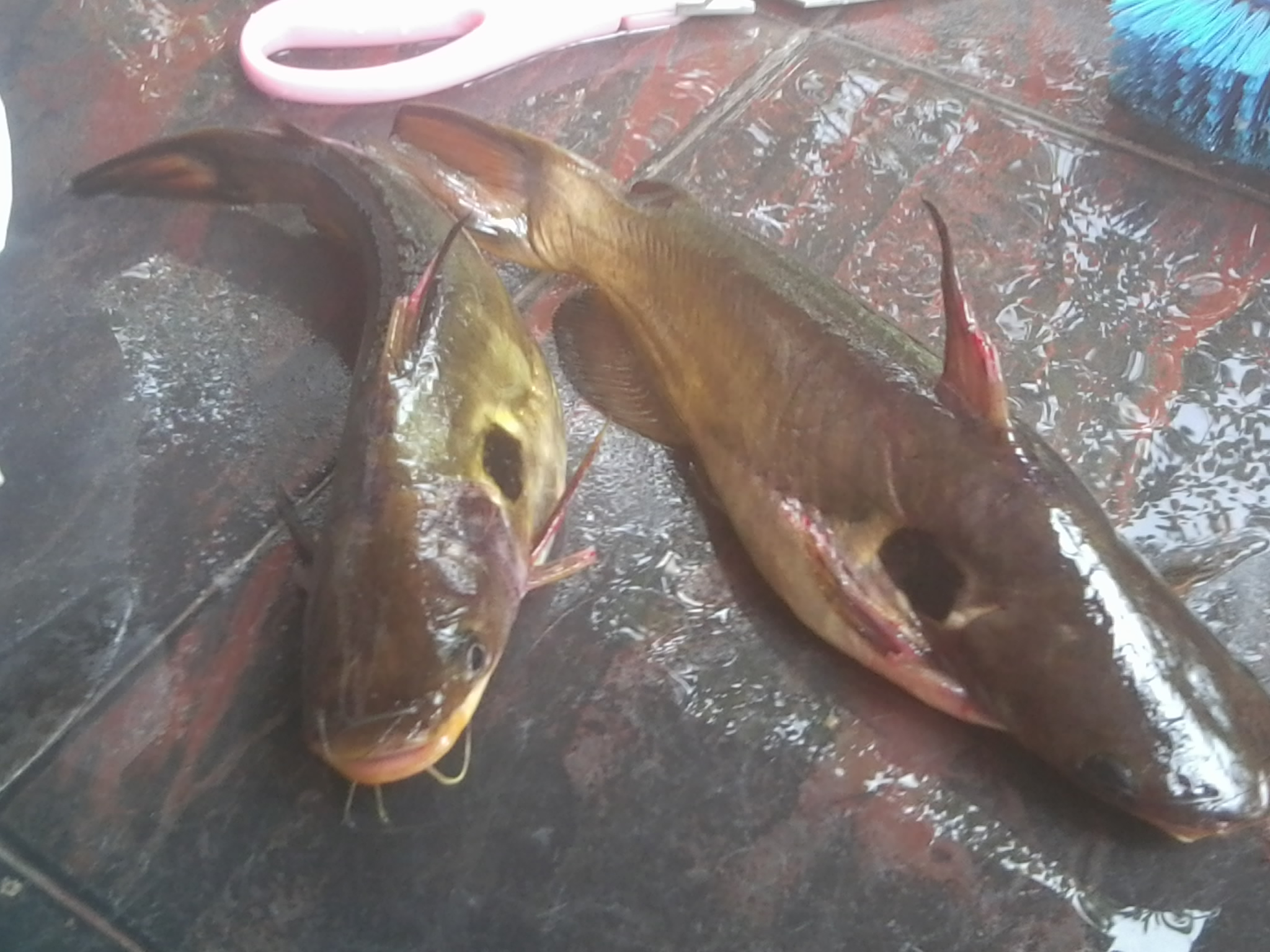
Adult Horabagrus brachysoma

== Distribution and habitat ==
Horabagrus brachysoma is known from the Kerala backwaters, Vembanad Lake, Chalakudy River, Meenachil River and Nethravathi River of southern Karnataka; it is also found in Kerala and the Uttara Kannada district of western Karnataka. It occurs in smooth flowing areas of rivers and backwaters with abundant vegetation and mud or sand substrate, and also has been recorded in deep pools and hill streams.

== Ecology ==
Horabagrus brachysoma is an unspecialized feeder and eats a variety of meaty foods, including crustaceans, molluscs, and fish, and adults may additionally consume terrestrial insects and even frogs. This flexible diet is beneficial in its variable habitat in which food availability is affected by monsoons. Feeding rate is known to increase during the breeding season in the months following the monsoon (September to December) and decrease during the monsoon (May to July). This decrease coincides with the spawning season of this species (at least in Vembanad Lake), but it is not thought to be associated with the spawning season; rather, it is probably due to the major ecological changes brought by the monsoon and the resultant decrease in the abundance of potential food items.

== Genetics ==
The population genetic structure of this species has been studied extensively by using genetic markers.

== Human interactions ==
Horabagrus brachysoma is an important food fish in India and is also sold in the aquarium trade. The IUCN considers this species to be vulnerable, while others have considered it to be an endangered species. This is not unjustified, as overexploitation, habitat alteration, pollution and related anthropogenic pressures on their natural habitats considerably reduced populations of this species in the early 2000s, for example.

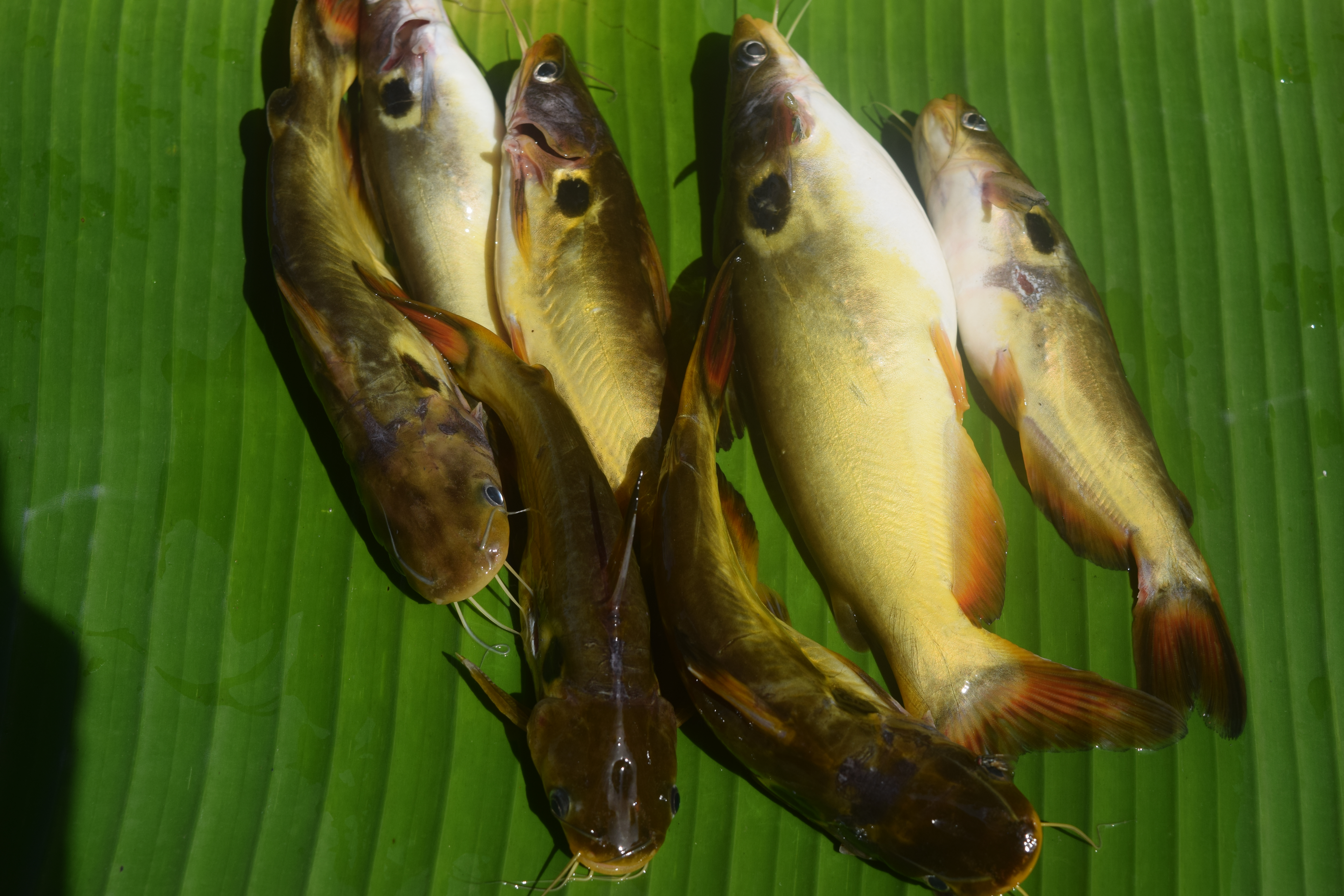
Horabagrus brachysoma in Chemmad, Kerala, India
