= P. inornatus =

P. inornatus may refer to:

- Parus inornatus, a tit species
- Perognathus inornatus, a mouse species
- Phylloscopus inornatus, a warbler species
- Phelpsia inornatus, a flycatcher species
- Philemon inornatus, a friarbird species
- Pseudojuloides inornatus, a wrasse species in the genus Pseudojuloides
- Pseudomystus inornatus, a catfish species in the genus Pseudomystus
- Ptychochromis inornatus, a fish species endemic to Madagascar

== See also ==
- Inornatus
