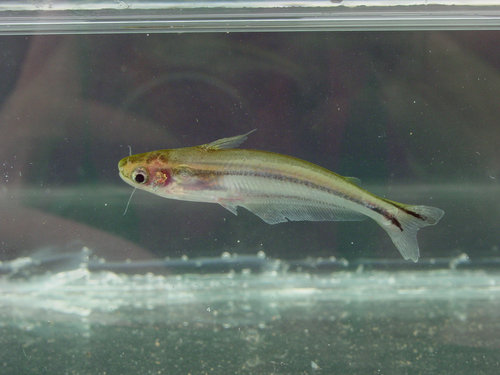

Conservation status
- Least Concern (IUCN 3.1)

Scientific classification
- Kingdom: Animalia
- Phylum: Chordata
- Class: Actinopterygii
- Order: Siluriformes
- Family: Schilbeidae
- Genus: Pareutropius
- Species: P. debauwi

Binomial name
- Pareutropius debauwi (Boulenger, 1900)

= Pareutropius debauwi =

Species of fish

Pareutropius debauwi is a species that belong to the Order Actinopterygii, ray-finned fishes, and can be placed in the Schilbeidae family, Schilbid catfishes. This family includes 9 genera and 46 species. The common name for Pareutropius debauwi is the African glass catfish.

== Etymology & Taxonomic History ==
The name of the genus is derived from the Greek words par, eu, and tropis, which respectively translate to "beside or near", "well", and "keel". This is in reference to the families compressed body form. The species name is derived from the Latin work vittatus, which loosely translates to "covered with stripes". This refers to the color and pattern found on this species.

== Physical Description ==
Pareutropius debauwi are silver in color. A single dorsal spine is present with up to six total dorsal soft rays. Seven to eight branchiostegal rays are present on one side of the head. A single pair of mandibular barbels are present. A single mid-lateral band is present across the body. No dark spots on caudal fin lobes but band continues onto caudal fin. The base of the anal fin is marked by a small, dark line.

== Distribution & Habitat ==

This species is native to Africa and is spread throughout Angola, the Republic of the Congo, Democratic Republic of the Congo, and Gabon. This species can be found in shallow water systems. Pareutropius debauwi are a freshwater species, specifically found in tropical waters. Pareutropius debauwi are a riverine species that can be found in large and small moderate water systems.

== Biology & Behavior ==
Pareutropius debauwi are omnivores, with some being carnivorous for insects. Mating behavior includes distinct pairing. Reproduction cycles coincide with flood periods. Females tend to be larger than males and have a rounded, short genital papilla. Pareutropius debauwi are an oviparous species. Eggs are unguarded and have no parental care. Are strongly diurnal and are a schooling species. Members within this species can reach up to 15 cm in length. The expected lifespan for this species is around eight years.

== Aquarium Life ==
Pareutropius debauwi should be kept in a large group, with up to at least ten other debauwi. This species is extremely active and requires a spacious environment with dimmed lighting. The water should resemble a moderate current with temperatures between 23°C to 26°C. The species are most comfortable in neutral waters consisting of a pH around 6.5 to 7.5. The diet should consist of a mixture of flakes, granulate and frozen foods. Daphnia, mosquito larvae or brine shrimp are ideal foods. Breeding Pareutropius debauwi in a home aquarium is not recommended but can be done under specific conditions.

== Conservation & Threats ==
Pareutropius debauwi is widespread and faces no serious threats.
