= Parailia pellucida =

Scientific classification
- Kingdom: Animalia
- Phylum: Chordata
- Class: Actinopterygii
- Division: Teleostei
- Order: Siluriformes
- Family: Schilbeidae
- Genus: Parailia
- Species: P. pellucida

Binomial name
- Parailia pellucida Boulenger, 1901

Species of fish

Parailia pellucida, the African glass catfish, is a small, transparent species of catfish that is generally found in the lakes and rivers of West Africa. Though it closely resembles the Asian glass catfish (Kryptopterus vitreolus), with the difference of a dark line running along its length and a typically cloudier body, they are not related and belong to different families. The glass-like body in both species just shows an example of convergent evolution. The African glass catfish comes from the Schilbeidae family, the genus Parailia (formerly referred to as Physailia) and the species pellucida. The African glass catfish typically feeds on small insects and crustaceans, spending its feeding time near the surface. This species is known to be a schooling fish, both in the wild and in the aquarium hobby. Other than its use in the aquarium trade, it also serves as food despite its small size, as well as playing a role in various research. The African glass catfish, due to being one of the smaller catfish species, is prey to other larger fish, one commonly known species being the African electric catfish.

== Species description ==
The African glass catfish has its characteristic "glass-like" appearance, with its internal organs being visible through its opaque or near transparent body. This unique body has been developed as a camouflage against predation. In addition to not being as clear as the Asian glass catfish, it also differs with a unique feature which is the black line running across the length of its body. The African glass catfish is the largest of its genus, with the size of the fish ranging from 2 cm to 11.7 cm. The average size though, around the time of maturity, seems to sit at around 6.275 cm. The weight typically ranges from 0.452 grams to 7.242 grams, with males generally being heavier than the females. Like most other catfish species, the African glass catfish does not have any scales, rather a mucus covered body. Also like most catfish, they possess barbels, which are sensory organs used to sense everything around their environment. Another key feature of the African glass catfish includes the lack of a rayed dorsal fin, which is generally present on most other members of the Schilbeidae family along with a dorsal spine, which the African glass catfish also lacks. In addition to missing the dorsal spine, the African glass catfish is also missing the anal spine, instead, they boast around 60 to 78 soft rays in the anal fin. They also possess an adipose fin, though sometimes extremely small. The African glass catfish looks similar to the other species from the same genus. They can also be misidentified as being part of the Siluridae family, which includes species such as the Asian glass catfish (Kryptopterus vitreolus), which is completely unrelated to the Schilbeidae family of fish despite sharing similar characteristics.

== Distribution ==
The African glass catfish is a freshwater fish found primarily inland in deep lakes, rivers, and deltas found in West Africa. The geographic distribution of where they reside span the bodies of water of Nigeria, Ivory Coast, and Mali. Some of the known places include the Lower Nun River, the Niger Delta, Lake Kainji, Ikpa River, Lake Sélingué, the Dadin Kowa Dam reservoir, Oramiriukwa River, the Upper Jebba Reservoir, the Aby Lagoon, and the Aghien Lagoon. The tropical climate, where this species is found, consists of both rainy and dry seasons, with many of the habitats of the African glass catfish being freshwater swamps and swamp rubber forests. Other habitats, like the Aghien Lagoon, where the African glass catfish is found in high percentages (>50%), are fed by rivers and are rich in various flora and fauna. Man made reservoirs, like the Kainji reservoir, in which the African glass catfish is the second most common family, are described as shallow and rocky. These reservoirs also contain heavy sediment that gets upset due to often flooding from rainfall and overflowing rivers. Whereas, in the Dadin Kowa Reservoir, the Schilbeidae family (including P. pellucida), only makes up 16.06% of the fish population. The lakes are typically full of aquatic plants and are based around rainforests, providing the fish with a high density of vegetation to feed, spawn, and hide from predators. Rivers like the Ikpa river, where the African glass catfish makes up 53.72% of the sampled species, are typically in the midst of rainforests. These rainforests are characterized by heavy rainfall, dense vegetation, temperatures that reach around 25 to 32 degrees Celsius, and are accompanied by high humidity.

== Life history ==
Though different environmental conditions can affect the growth rate, size, and reproduction of the African glass catfish, there are still general observations that can be noted. The African glass catfish shows a rapid early growth rate, with the catfish growing quickly early on in its life and slowing down as it gets older. Females tend to grow faster than males early on and have a higher maximum size, but males end up reaching sexual maturity quicker. In the winter, the growth of the catfish tends to slow. Negative allometric growth can be seen in both males and females, with the body becoming thinner as the fish gets older. The typical age of the African glass catfish tends to lie between 3 and 5 years, with females seemingly having shorter life spans. The method that was used to determine the lifespan of the fish was the length-frequency method. In this method, the fish length was measured, transformed into a length frequency plot, representing a steady state population. Then the polymodal length frequency plot was analyzed and a growth curve was fitted to obtain the mean length that correlated with the age on the time axis. The age of spawning for the catfish was estimated to be within the first year of its life, with the average length during spawning being around 2.6 cm. Though the African glass catfish has multiple spawning seasons throughout the year, the peak months seem to be June through December, mostly during rainy seasons. The amount of eggs that the females will lay depends on their body size, but estimates put the egg count anywhere from around 900 to 3500 depending on the fish size, habitat, nutrition, and season. The diameter of the eggs ranges from 0.65 mm to 2.22 mm, which some assume the size variation to be in part due to its continuous, repeated spawning throughout the year. The mortality rate of the African glass catfish is very high, with the Z/K ratio for the catfish measured at 3.514 in Jebba Lake (Z being the total mortality rate and K being the population growth rate). The ratio shows that the mortality rate of fish is higher than the population's growth, leading to a decline in population overall. Along with the catfish being classified as an r-strategist fish (high number of eggs/offspring with little care provided by parents) leading to high natural mortality, the high Z/K value (>1) only contributes to declining the population of the African glass catfish. Research has shown that this fish is highly overfished and captured for human use in certain bodies of water, further causing a high artificially induced mortality. In terms of feeding, the African glass catfish preys on a variety of small insects and crustaceans depending on their location. Its terminal, forward facing mouth allows it to feed throughout the water column, rather than being a bottom feeder. In one example of its diet, in the Ase River, P. pellucida has been recorded to eat primarily Pentaneura larvae, which accounted for 90.20% of the diet by occurrence, with other larvae as well as insects making up the rest of the diet. Other studies have shown that they feed on macrophytes, detritus, and insects. When looking at three rivers in Côte d'Ivoire, it was found that their diet consisted of 22 different food types, with 60.9% being Chironomidae larvae, 16% Ephemeroptera, and the rest being other insects, zooplankton, phytoplankton, and plant debris.

== Conservation status ==
The African glass catfish has been consistently and widely utilized by humans, with the main reasons for capture being food, ornamental purposes (for aquariums), as well as some scientific studies. There are various fisheries and aquaculture farms across West Africa that raise or fish for this species including the Aby Lagoon, Lake Kainji, the Jebba Reservoir, and the Lower Nun River. With this species having one of the highest fat content of any freshwater fish, also being high in calories, and rich in amino acids, in addition to being appetizing, it is used as a food item despite its small size. Due to its small size, it us usually dried or smoked and serves as a cheaper source of protein than larger fish in the area. Many fish farms, like the ones along the Ikpa River, raise African glass catfish as an ornamental fish to sell for the aquarist hobby. With its trademark glass body, the African glass catfish is sought after as a unique addition to many aquariums, with the benefit of being known to readily eat artificial flake food. Though they are mostly wild caught and not bred in captivity, their large numbers and year-round reproduction makes it easy to gather large numbers and replace the population in the farms. Its high mortality rate does pose a problem to scientific studies and research where they are kept in aquariums, which was noted in some studies. The conservation status of the African glass catfish is that of Least Concern (LC), even though it still faces a lot of threats from overexploitation and pollution. The rivers, lakes, lagoons, and deltas that this species resides in are constantly under the threat of overfishing, pollution from pesticides and fertilizers, engine operation, dams, deforestation, and waste from palm oil factories. These factors contribute to the degradation of the water quality and surrounding ecosystem. There does not appear to be any invasive species that poses a risk to the African glass catfish, though due to its small size, it does have natural predators.
