= Pareutropius longifilis =

Conservation status
- Least Concern (IUCN 3.1)

Scientific classification
- Kingdom: Animalia
- Phylum: Chordata
- Class: Actinopterygii
- Order: Siluriformes
- Family: Schilbeidae
- Genus: Pareutropius
- Species: P. longifilis

Binomial name
- Pareutropius longifilis (Steindachner, 1914)

Synonyms
- Eutropius longifilis Steindachner, 1914; Eutropiellus longifilis (Steindachner, 1914); Pareutropius micristius Regan, 1920

Species of fish

Pareutropius longifilis is a species of fish in the family Schilbeidae. It is found in Malawi, Mozambique and Tanzania where it occurs in rivers north of and in the Ruvuma River system, Lake Chiuta and Lake Chilwa. Its natural habitats are freshwater lakes and intermittent freshwater lakes. This species grows to a length of 10.2 centimetres (4.0 in) TL.
