= Horabagrus nigricollaris =

Conservation status
- Endangered (IUCN 3.1)

Scientific classification
- Kingdom: Animalia
- Phylum: Chordata
- Class: Actinopterygii
- Order: Siluriformes
- Family: Horabagridae
- Genus: Horabagrus
- Species: H. nigricollaris

Binomial name
- Horabagrus nigricollaris Pethiyagoda & Kottelat, 1994

Species of fish

Horabagrus nigricollaris is a species of catfish endemic to India. It is also known as the "Black collared catfish". It is found only in the Chalakudy River in Kerala, India. This species is an inhabitant of hill streams.

== Description ==
H. nigricollaris is sleeker in body shape than H. brachysoma and can reach a length of 27 centimetres (11 in) TL. This species is less yellow than H. brachysoma and the black markings extend over the neck, forming a "black collar" (hence the scientific name).
