= Diplomystes mesembrinus =

Conservation status
- Data Deficient (IUCN 3.1)

Scientific classification
- Kingdom: Animalia
- Phylum: Chordata
- Class: Actinopterygii
- Order: Siluriformes
- Family: Diplomystidae
- Genus: Diplomystes
- Species: D. mesembrinus

Binomial name
- Diplomystes mesembrinus Ringuelet, 1982

Synonyms
- Olivaichthys mesembrinus (Ringuelet, 1982)

Species of fish

Diplomystes mesembrinus is a species of freshwater ray-finned fish belonging to the family Diplomystidae, the velvet catfishes. This fish is endemic to Argentina where it is found in the Chubut and Senguer River basins. It grows to a maximum standard length of 16.8 cm (6.6 in).
