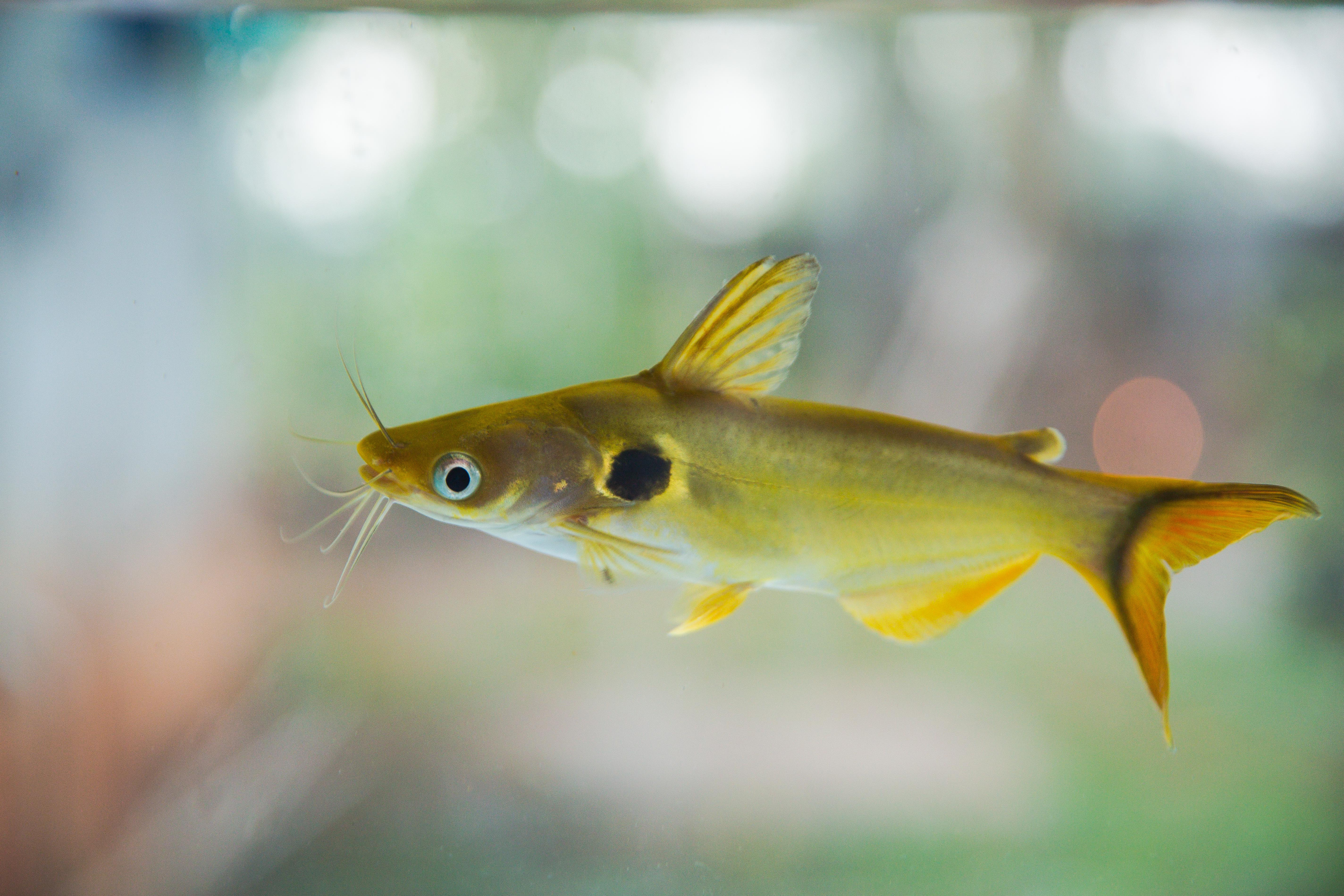
- Horabagrus brachysoma

Scientific classification
- Kingdom: Animalia
- Phylum: Chordata
- Class: Actinopterygii
- Division: Teleostei
- Order: Siluriformes
- Family: Horabagridae
- Genus: Horabagrus; Jayaram, 1955

Type species
- Pseudobagrus brachysoma Günther, 1864

= Horabagrus =

Genus of fishes

Horabagrus is a genus of catfish in the family Horabagridae endemic to rivers in the Western Ghats in Kerala and Karnataka, India. H. brachysoma is an important food fish and members of this genus can be found in the aquarium trade.

== Taxonomy ==
The genus Horabagrus is usually classified under the family Bagridae, but there are disagreements. The genus name is after the Indian zoologist Sunder Lal Hora. Though listed under Bagridae, Horabagrus is not listed under either of the two Bagrid subfamilies by the All Catfish Species Inventory. In Nelson (2006), the genus is provisionally placed in the family Schilbeidae, where it is sometimes recognized as its own subfamily. In de Pinna (1998), this genus is classified as sister to the catfishes Pangasiidae and above, which would require a separate family. This genus has also been classified in its own family Horabagridae. In a 2007 paper, Horabagrus was not classified under any current catfish families. In 2016, Wang et al. placed this genus in the family Horabagridae.

== Species ==
There are currently 3 recognized species in this genus:

- Horabagrus brachysoma (Günther, 1864) (Günther's catfish)
- Horabagrus nigricollaris Pethiyagoda & Kottelat, 1994
- Horabagrus obscurus Kumar, Ravi, Krishnaprasoon & Basheer, 2024

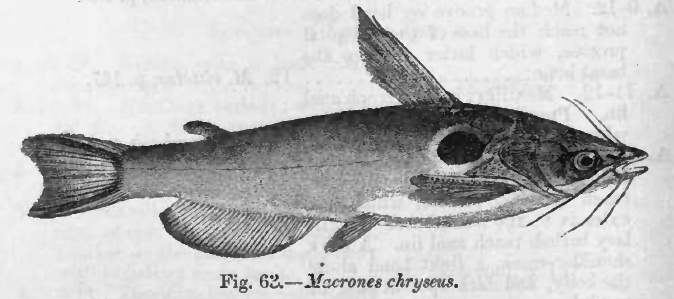
The Diagram

A potential fourth species, Horabagrus melanosoma, was described in 2013, but later authorities considered it inseparable from H. brachysoma and therefore a junior synonym.

== In the aquarium ==
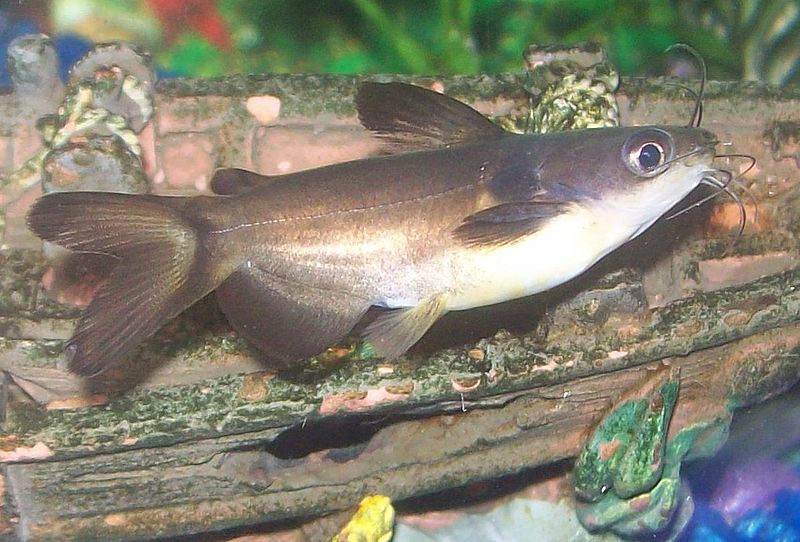
A juvenile Horabagrus catfish in an aquarium

H. brachysoma is a common fish in the aquarium trade. H. nigricollaris is more seldom seen because it is not commercially farmed like H. brachysoma . Nevertheless, the care for these two species is similar. These fish are adaptable and are not picky about water conditions; also, they are hardy and easy to feed. However, these fish are light-shy and require plants or decorations to hide underneath for darkness; these fish are relatively secretive during the day.
