= Irvineia voltae =

Conservation status
- Endangered (IUCN 3.1)

Scientific classification
- Kingdom: Animalia
- Phylum: Chordata
- Class: Actinopterygii
- Order: Siluriformes
- Family: Schilbeidae
- Genus: Irvineia
- Species: I. voltae

Binomial name
- Irvineia voltae Trewavas, 1943

Species of fish

Irvineia voltae is a species of schilbid catfish endemic to the lower Volta River in Ghana. This species grows to a length of 17.8 centimetres (7.0 in) SL. They are oviparous and do not guard their eggs.

== Conservation ==
I. voltae is classified as an endangered species by IUCN; in Ghana there is a conservation policy in place for the species.
