= Pareutropius mandevillei =

Conservation status
- Least Concern (IUCN 3.1)

Scientific classification
- Kingdom: Animalia
- Phylum: Chordata
- Class: Actinopterygii
- Order: Siluriformes
- Family: Schilbeidae
- Genus: Pareutropius
- Species: P. mandevillei

Binomial name
- Pareutropius mandevillei (Poll, 1959)

Synonyms
- Eutropiellus mandevillei Poll, 1959

Species of fish

Pareutropius mandevillei is a species of fish in the family Schilbeidae, the schilbid catfishes.

== Description ==
The species reaches a maximum length 5.8 centimetres (2.3 in). Its skin is brownish-silver with some grey stripes.

== Distribution and habitat ==
It is native to Stanley Pool, Republic of Congo and Zaire.
