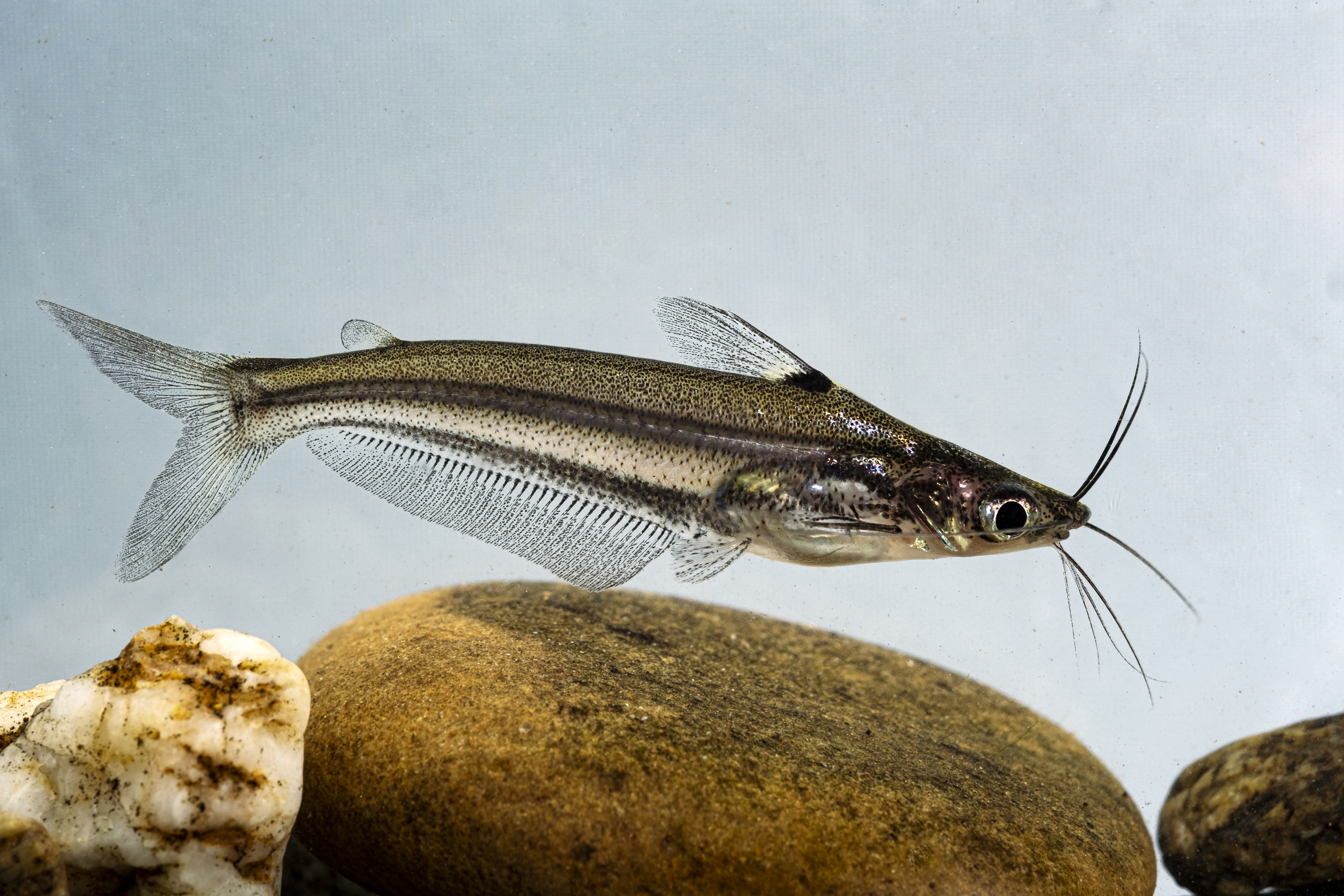
- Pachypterus acutirostris

Scientific classification
- Kingdom: Animalia
- Phylum: Chordata
- Class: Actinopterygii
- Order: Siluriformes
- Family: Horabagridae
- Genus: Pachypterus; Swainson, 1838

Type species
- Silurus atherinoides Bloch, 1794

Synonyms
- Neotropius Kulkarni, 1952

= Pachypterus =

Genus of fishes

Pachypterus is a genus of catfishes formerly placed in the families Schilbeidae and Bagridae but recent work has suggested it be placed in the newer family Horabagridae, the genus is native to South Asia.

== Species ==
There are currently 3 recognized species in this genus:

- Pachypterus acutirostris (Day. 1870)
- Pachypterus atherinoides (Bloch, 1794) (Indian potasi)
- Pachypterus khavalchor (Kulkarni, 1952) (Khavalchor catfish)
