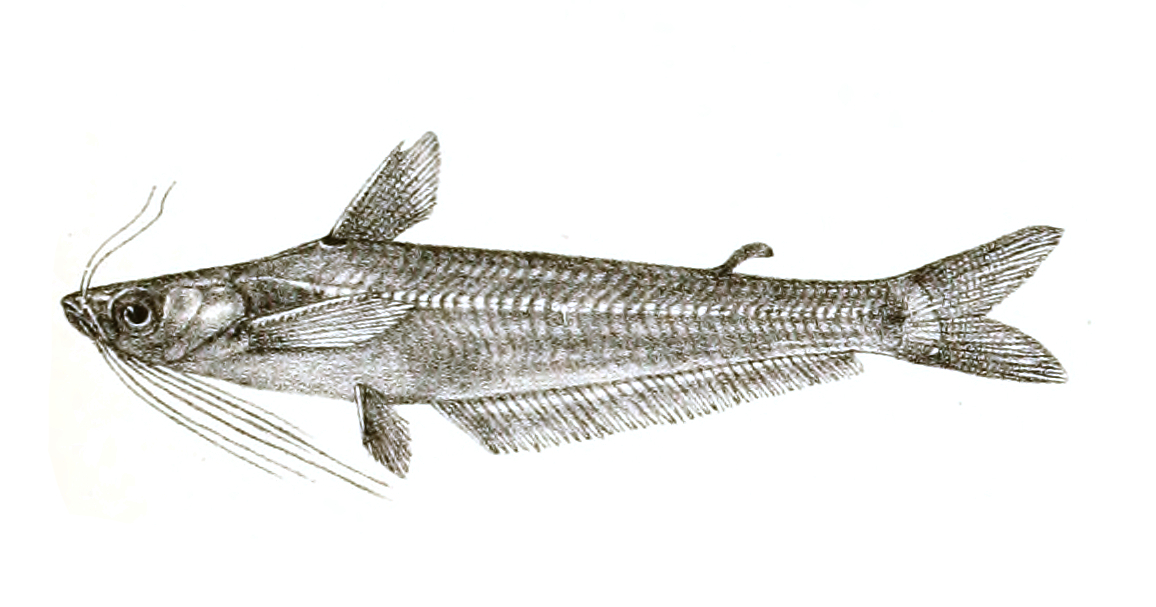

Conservation status
- Least Concern (IUCN 3.1)

Scientific classification
- Kingdom: Animalia
- Phylum: Chordata
- Class: Actinopterygii
- Order: Siluriformes
- Family: Horabagridae
- Genus: Pachypterus
- Species: P. atherinoides

Binomial name
- Pachypterus atherinoides (Bloch, 1794)

Synonyms
- List: Neotropius atherinoides (Bloch, 1794); Pseudotropius atherinoides (Bloch, 1794); Bagrus atherinoides (Bloch, 1794); Bagrus urua (Hamilton, 1822); Clupisoma atherinoides (Bloch, 1794); Pachypterus trifasciatus (Swainson, 1839); Pimelodus angius Hamilton, 1822; Bagrus angius (Hamilton, 1822); Pimelodus argius (Hamilton, 1822); Pimelodus urna (Hamilton, 1822); Pimelodus urua (Hamilton, 1822); Pseudeutropius atherinoides (Bloch, 1794); Pseudeutropius atherinoides walkeri (Chaudhuri, 1912); Silurus atherinoides (Bloch, 1794); Pseudeutropius acutirostris (Day, 1870)

= Pachypterus atherinoides =

Genus of fishes

Pachypterus atherinoides, also known as Indian potasi, is a freshwater fish found in Bangladesh, India, Myanmar, Nepal, and Pakistan.

In Bangladesh, the fish is called Batashi (বাতাসী).
