= Platytropius =

Scientific classification
- Kingdom: Animalia
- Phylum: Chordata
- Class: Actinopterygii
- Order: Siluriformes
- Family: Horabagridae
- Genus: †Platytropius; Hora, 1937

Type species
- Platytropius siamensis (Sauvage), 1883

Genus of fishes

Platytropius was a genus of schilbid catfishes native to Asia. The only valid species is now considered to be extinct.

== Species ==
There were two recognized species:

- †Platytropius siamensis (Sauvage, 1883)
- Platytropius yunnanensis He, Huang & Li, 1995; valid as Clupisoma yunnanense
