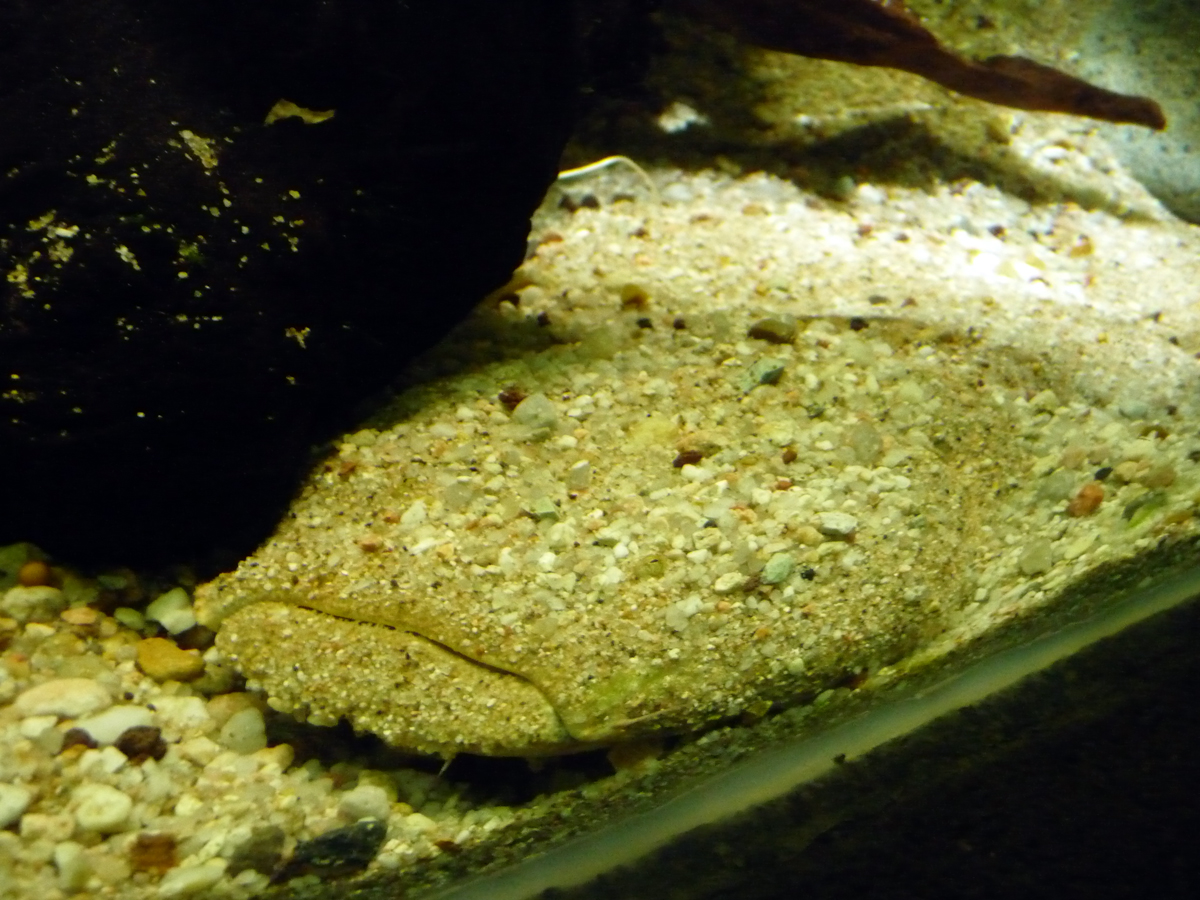

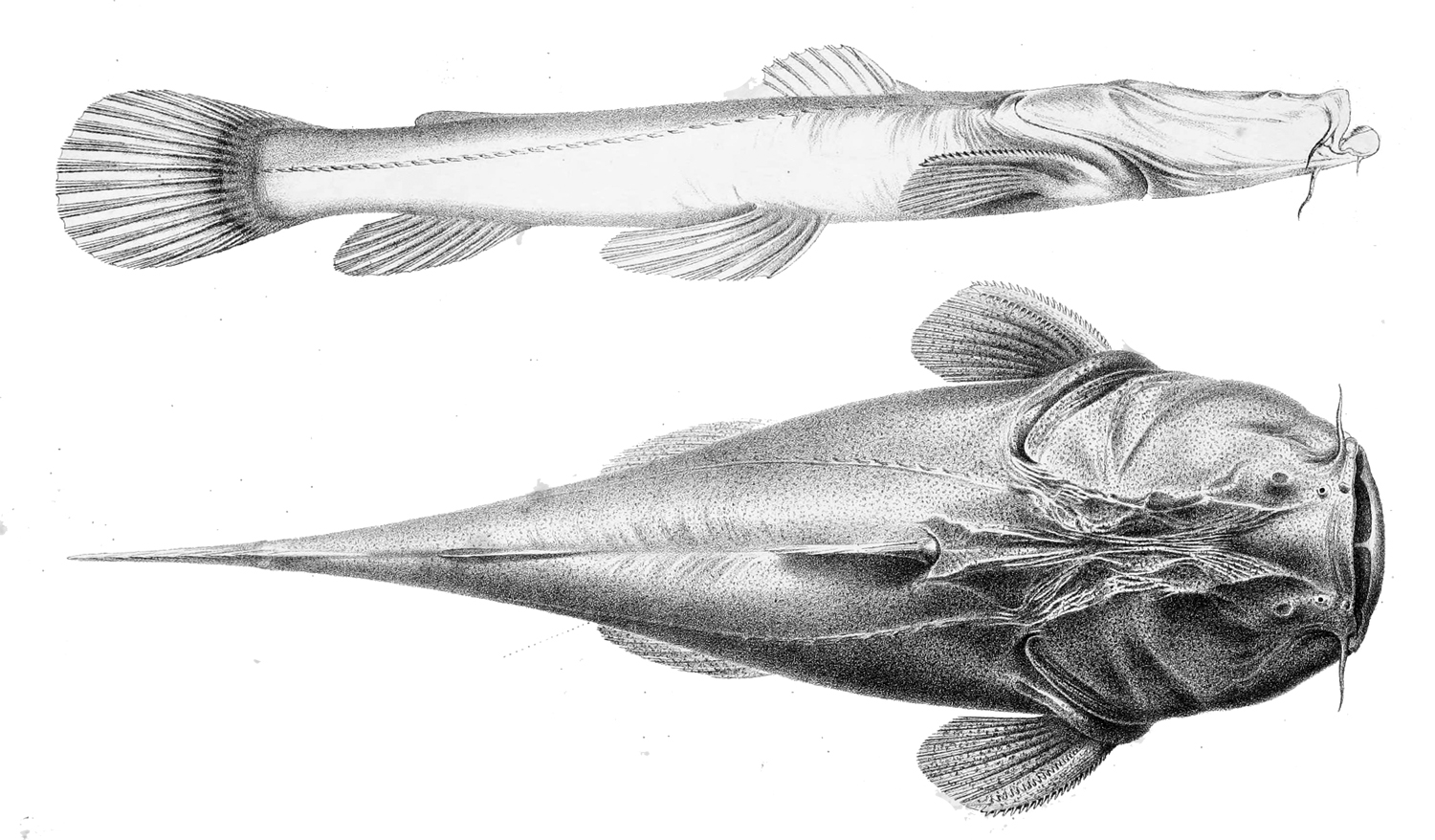

Scientific classification
- Kingdom: Animalia
- Phylum: Chordata
- Class: Actinopterygii
- Order: Siluriformes
- Family: Pseudopimelodidae
- Genus: Lophiosilurus; Steindachner, 1876
- Species: L. alexandri

Binomial name
- Lophiosilurus alexandri Steindachner, 1876

Synonyms
- Lophiosilurus agassizi Steindachner, 1880

= Lophiosilurus alexandri =

Species of fish

Lophiosilurus alexandri is a species of catfish (order Siluriformes) of the family Pseudopimelodidae, and the type species of the genus Lophiosilurus.

== Distribution and habitat ==
This fish originates from the São Francisco River in Brazil. Here, it is commonly known as pacamã. It prefers lentic habitats. This species has been introduced into the Doce River basin, but its effect on the native species has not been studied.

== Description and ecology ==
This fish reaches 72 cm (2.36 ft) in total length and has a maximum published weight of 5 kg (11 lb). It has an extremely large mouth, earning it the name Pac-Man catfish.

L. alexandri is a sedentary species. This species has adhesive eggs and the male displays parental care.

L. alexandri represents an example of parallel evolution, sharing a similar morphology and lifestyle to species of the distantly related Chaca catfish.

== Relationship to humans ==
L. alexandri is considered threatened by Brazil's Ministry of the Environment.

L. alexandri has economic potential for aquaculture. It is a rarely imported aquarium fish. These fish require a sandy substrate and should not be maintained with fish that it can eat (a fish less than half of its size).
