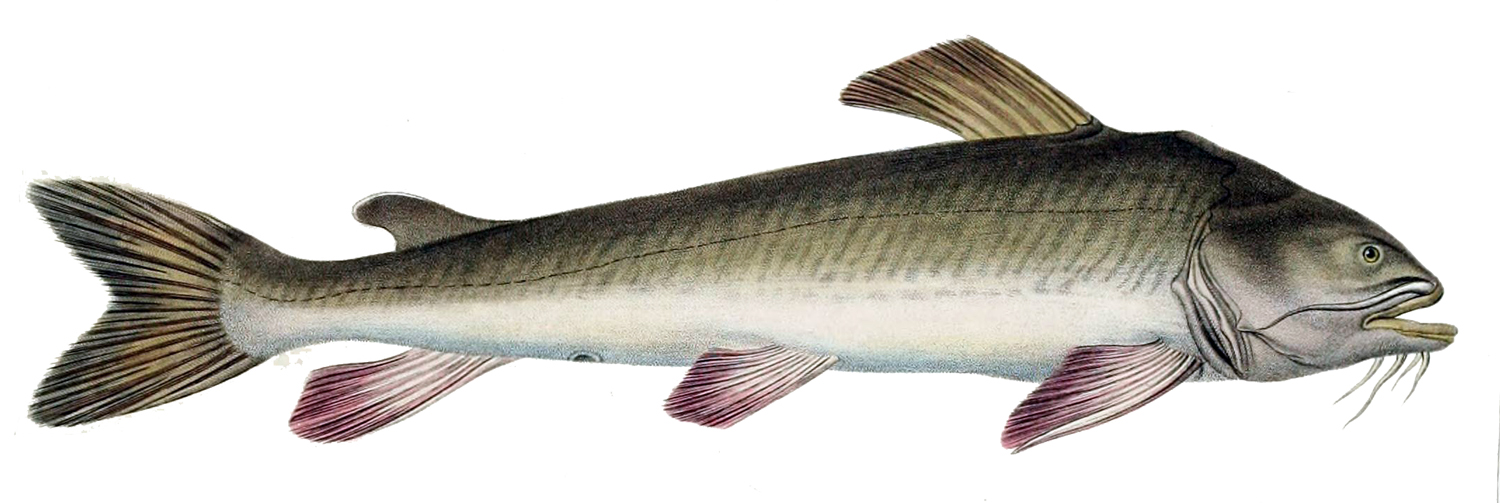
- Pseudopimelodus mangurus
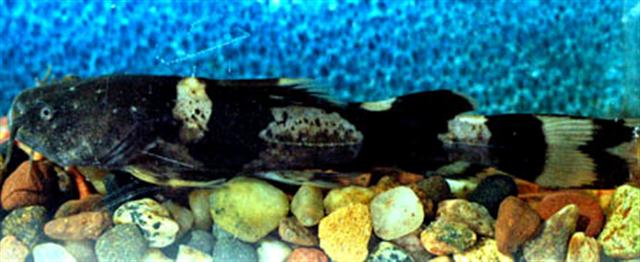
- Pseudopimelodus bufonius

Scientific classification
- Kingdom: Animalia
- Phylum: Chordata
- Class: Actinopterygii
- Order: Siluriformes
- Family: Pseudopimelodidae
- Genus: Pseudopimelodus; Bleeker, 1858

Type species
- Pimelodus bufonius Valenciennes, 1840

= Pseudopimelodus =

Genus of fishes

Pseudopimelodus is a genus of catfishes (order Siluriformes) of the family Pseudopimelodidae.

== Species ==
There are currently 6 recognized species in this genus:

- Pseudopimelodus atricaudus Restrepo-Gómez, Rangel-Medrano, Márquez & Ortega-Lara, 2020
- Pseudopimelodus bufonius (Valenciennes, 1840)
- Pseudopimelodus charus (Valenciennes, 1840)
- Pseudopimelodus magnus Restrepo-Gómez, Rangel-Medrano, Márquez & Ortega-Lara, 2020
- Pseudopimelodus mangurus (Valenciennes, 1835)
- Pseudopimelodus schultzi (Dahl, 1955)

== Distribution ==
Pseudopimelodus species are distributed throughout South America. P. bufonius is found in rivers of northeastern South America from Lake Maracaibo to eastern Brazil. P. charus originates from the São Francisco River basin. P. mangurus inhabits the Uruguay, Paraná, Paraguay and Río de la Plata basins. P. schultzi originates from the Magdalena River basin.

== Description ==
P. charus and P. schultzi grow to about 20 cm (7.9 in) SL. P. mangurus has a maximum size of about 35 cm (14 in) SL.
