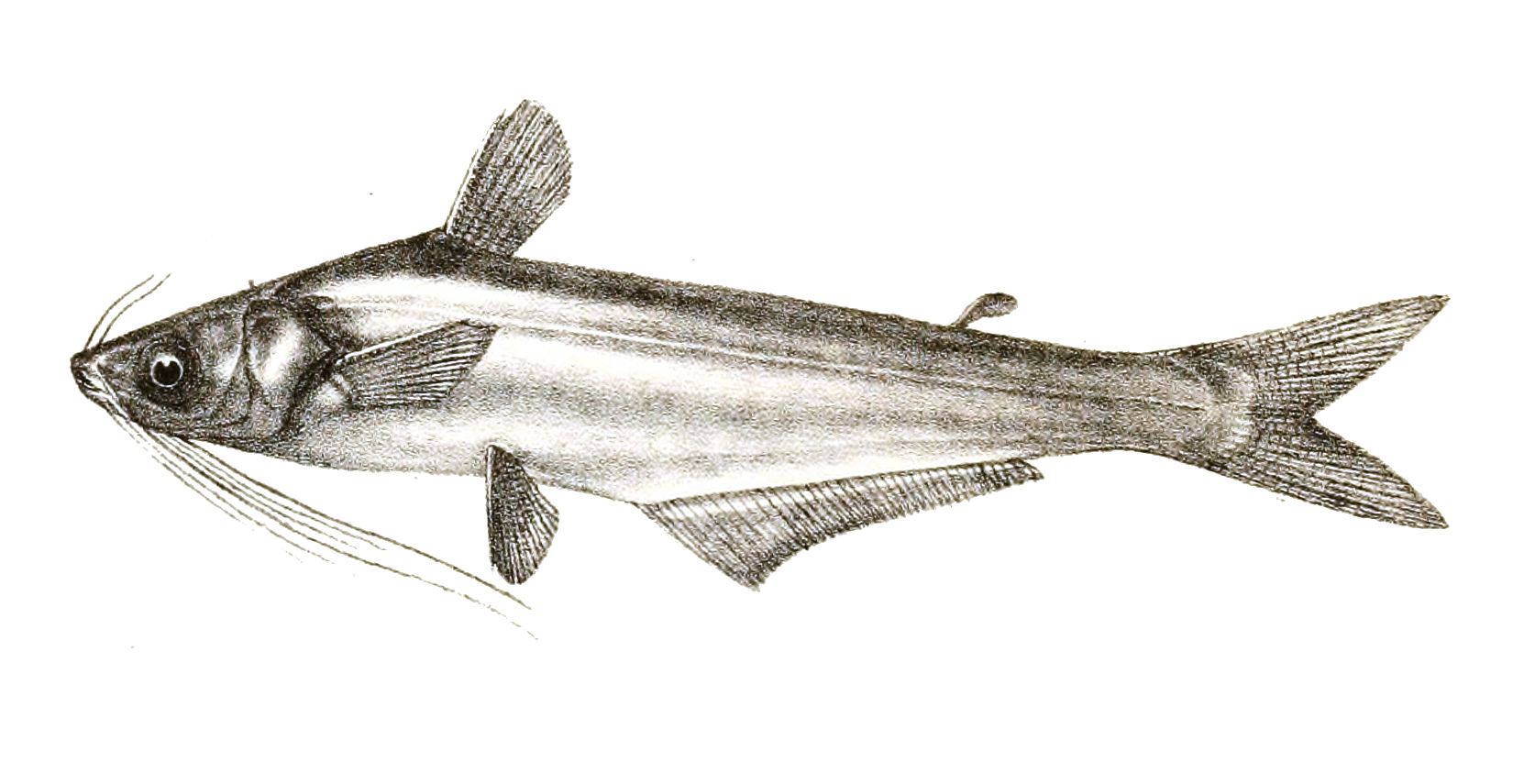
- Pseudeutropius mitchelli (P. sykesii)

Scientific classification
- Kingdom: Animalia
- Phylum: Chordata
- Class: Actinopterygii
- Division: Teleostei
- Order: Siluriformes
- Family: Horabagridae
- Genus: Pseudeutropius
- Species: P. mitchelli

Binomial name
- Pseudeutropius mitchelli Günther, 1864

= Pseudeutropius mitchelli =

Species of fish

Pseudeutropius mitchelli is an endangered species of freshwater fishes endemic to Kerala, India that belongs to the family of Schilbid catfishes. It is known as Malabar patashi.

== Distribution ==
Pseudeutropius mitchelli is endemic to the rivers of Kerala, part of Western Ghats. Known from the middle reaches of the Chaliyar, Bharatapuzha, Chalakudy River, Periyar River, and Achenkovil.

== Description ==
A species of Pseudeutropius with head 4.7–5.1 in SL; eye diameter 3.0–3.5 in head; mouth terminal, upper jaw slightly longer than lower jaw; teeth villiform, in bands on jaws; vomero-palatine in two distinct, small, oval patches; 4 pairs of barbels; maxillary barbels extend to middle of pelvic fins; dorsal fin inserted anterior to pelvic fins.
