= Irvineia =

Scientific classification
- Domain: Eukaryota
- Kingdom: Animalia
- Phylum: Chordata
- Class: Actinopterygii
- Order: Siluriformes
- Family: Schilbeidae
- Genus: Irvineia; Trewavas, 1943

Type species
- Irvineia voltae Trewavas, 1943

Genus of fishes

Irvineia is a genus of schilbid catfishes native to Africa.

== Species ==
There are currently two recognized species in this genus:

- Irvineia orientalis Trewavas, 1964
- Irvineia voltae Trewavas, 1943

I. orientalis originates from the Jubba-Shebelle system and grows to 50.2 cm (19.8 in) SL. I. voltae is endemic to the Volta River and grows to the 17.8 cm SL (7.0 in) SL. These fish are oviparous and do not guard their eggs.
