= Rhyacoglanis =

Scientific classification
- Kingdom: Animalia
- Phylum: Chordata
- Class: Actinopterygii
- Order: Siluriformes
- Family: Pseudopimelodidae
- Genus: Rhyacoglanis; Shibatta & Vari, 2017

Type species
- Pimelodus pulcher Boulenger, 1887

Genus of catfishes

Rhyacoglanis is a genus of catfishes (order Siluriformes) of the family Pseudopimelodidae.

== Species ==
There are 9 species in the database, and the other 3 haven't been described, so they won't be included.

- Rhyacoglanis annulatus Shibatta & Vari, 2017
- Rhyacoglanis beninei Crispim-Rodrigues, Silva, Shibatta, Kuranaka & Oliveira, 2023
- Rhyacoglanis epiblepsis Shibatta & Vari, 2017
- Rhyacoglanis paranensis Shibatta & Vari, 2017
- Rhyacoglanis pulcher (Boulenger, 1887)
- Rhyacoglanis rapppydanielae Shibatta, Rocha & Oliveira, 2021
- Rhyacoglanis seminiger Shibatta & Vari, 2017
- Rhyacoglanis varii Shibatta & Souza-Shibatta, 2023
- Rhyacoglanis variolosus (Miranda Ribeiro, 1914)

== Identification ==
Rhyacoglanis is distinguished from other Pseudopimelodidae by three synapomorphies: the presence of a light blotch on the cheek; a connection between the middle of the dark caudal-fin stripe and the dark caudal-peduncle pigmentation; and 30–35 total vertebrae.

== Distribution ==
Rhyacoglanis genus is widely distributed in the cis-Andean portions of South America, mainly in the Amazon, Orinoco, Paraná, Paraguay, and lower rio Tocantins basins.
