= Diplomystes viedmensis =

Conservation status
- Data Deficient (IUCN 3.1)

Scientific classification
- Kingdom: Animalia
- Phylum: Chordata
- Class: Actinopterygii
- Order: Siluriformes
- Family: Diplomystidae
- Genus: Diplomystes
- Species: D. viedmensis

Binomial name
- Diplomystes viedmensis MacDonagh, 1931

Synonyms
- Olivaichthys viedmensis (MacDonagh, 1931)

Species of fish

Diplomystes viedmensis, the Otuno, is a species of freshwater ray-finned fish belonging to the family Diplomystidae, the velvet catfishes. This fish is endemic to Argentina where it is found in the Rio Negro and tributaries. It reaches a maximum standard length of 32.4 cm (12.8 in).
