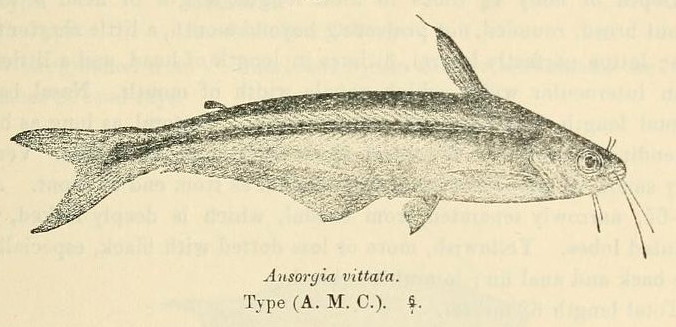
- Pareutropius debauwi

Scientific classification
- Kingdom: Animalia
- Phylum: Chordata
- Class: Actinopterygii
- Order: Siluriformes
- Family: Schilbeidae
- Genus: Pareutropius; Regan, 1920

Type species
- Pareutropius longifilis Steindachner, 1914

Synonyms
- Ansorgia Boulenger, 1912; Eutropiellus Nichols & La Monte, 1933; Ansorgiichthys Whitley, 1935

= Pareutropius =

Genus of fishes

Pareutropius is a genus of schilbid catfishes native to Africa.

== Species ==
There are currently four recognized species in this genus:

- Pareutropius buffei (Gras, 1961)
- Pareutropius debauwi (Boulenger, 1900) (African glass catfish)
- Pareutropius longifilis (Steindachner, 1914)
- Pareutropius mandevillei Poll, 1959
