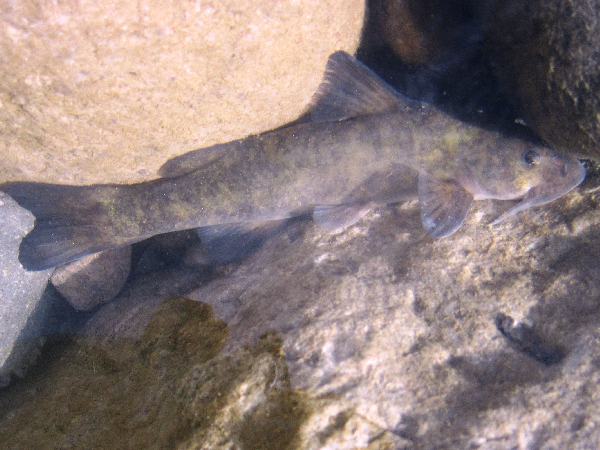
- Diplomystes nahuelbutaensis

Scientific classification
- Kingdom: Animalia
- Phylum: Chordata
- Class: Actinopterygii
- Order: Siluriformes
- Suborder: Diplomystoidei; Grande, 1987
- Family: Diplomystidae; C. H. Eigenmann, 1890
- Genus: Diplomystes; Bleeker, 1858

Type species
- Arius papillosus Valenciennes, 1840

Synonyms
- Diplomystax Günther, 1864; Olivaichthys Arriata, 1987

= Diplomystes =

Genus of fishes

Diplomystes is a genus of freshwater ray-finned fishes belonging to the monotypic family Diplomystidae, the velvet catfishes. These are basal catfishes endemic to freshwater habitats in Argentina and Chile in southern South America.

== Taxonomy ==
The family Diplomystidae has been considered as the basal, primitive sister group to all other catfishes (Siluroidei) on the basis of morphological evidence. Almost all molecular estimates of catfish phylogeny, by contrast, find Diplomystidae sister to Siluroidei, with Loricarioidei (the armoured catfish and relatives) the most basal group; though this may be an artifact of rapid evolution in loricarioids.

Diplomystids retain more plesiomorphic characteristics than any other siluriforms, recent or fossil, including aspects of the maxillary bones, barbels, nares, otic capsule, anterior pterygoid bones, Weberian complex centra, caudal skeleton, and fin rays, and pectoral girdle. Monophyly for Diplomystidae is well supported by synapomorphies of the vomerine and palatine shapes, cranial articulation of the hyomandibula, and heavily papillose skin.

Olivaichthys is a genus erected by Gloria Arratia in 1987. However, many recent authors synonymize this genus with Diplomystes. A molecular analysis has proposed that the trans-Andean Diplomystes and the cis-Andean Olivaichthys are so closely related (in addition to the close morphological similarity), that Olivaichthys should not be recognized. Eschmeyer's Catalog of Fishes treats Olivaichthys as a junior synonym of Diplomystes.

== Species ==
Diplomystes contains the following valid, extant species:

- Diplomystes arratiae Muñoz-Ramírez, Colin, Canales-Aguirre, Manosalva, López-Rodríguez, Sukumaran & Górski, 2023
- Diplomystes camposensis Arratia, 1987
- Diplomystes chilensis (Molina, 1782) (Tollo)
- Diplomystes cuyanus Ringuelet, 1965
- Diplomystes habitae Muñoz-Ramírez, Colin, Canales-Aguirre, Manosalva, López-Rodríguez, Sukumaran & Górski, 2023
- Diplomystes incognitus Arratia & Quezada-Romegialli, 2017
- Diplomystes mesembrinus Ringuelet, 1982
- Diplomystes nahuelbutaensis Arratia, 1987
- Diplomystes viedmensis MacDonagh, 1931 (Otuno)

== Fossil record ==
Diplomystidae is first recorded in the fossil record from indeterminate pectoral spines from the Campanian and Maastrichtian of Argentina and Bolivia.

== Description ==
Diplomystids are the only extant catfish family with teeth on a well-developed maxilla (although this is also true of the extinct genus Hypsidoris). Diplomystids possess maxillary barbels. The dorsal and pectoral fins have spines. The largest species reaches 32 cm (13 in).

== Ecology ==
Relatively little is known of the habits and life history of diplomystids. In Chile, diplomystids are mostly found to be benthic in fast-moving streams, and D. camposensis also occurs in lakes. O. viedmensis has been taken from rivers near sea level to about 1,900 m.

Diplomystids are generalized carnivores that consume annelids, mollusks, and arthropods. Specimens of D. nahuelbutaensis from fast-flowing, moderate-elevation (370–520 m) tributaries of the Bío Bío River had eaten aquatic insect larvae, especially chironomids, and the relatively large decapod crustacean Aegla.

Reproduction occurs at least during the austral summer based on captures of females with maturing eggs, and the juveniles reported here were collected in December.

== Conservation ==
All diplomystids are considered to be potentially or actually threatened or endangered due to habitat deterioration and predation or competition by introduced trout, Oncorhynchus mykiss and Salmo trutta. D. chilensis may be extinct.

== See also ==
- List of fish families
