= Siluranodon =

Siluranodon auritus

Conservation status
- Least Concern (IUCN 3.1)

Scientific classification
- Kingdom: Animalia
- Phylum: Chordata
- Class: Actinopterygii
- Order: Siluriformes
- Family: Schilbeidae
- Genus: Siluranodon; Bleeker, 1858
- Species: S. auritus

Binomial name
- Siluranodon auritus (Geoffroy Saint-Hilaire, 1809)

Synonyms
- Silurus auritus Geoffroy Saint-Hilaire, 1809; Schilbe auritus (Geoffroy Saint-Hilaire, 1809)

Genus of fishes

Siluranodon auritus is the only species in the genus Siluranodon of the catfish (order Siluriformes) family Schilbeidae.

This species is known from the Nile River and the Chad, Niger, Volta, and Comoe basins. In the Sudd, these fish have been found to occur beneath fringing Eichhornia.

Although it has been previously thought that fish of this species lack teeth, it has been found that they have very reduced teeth. As the fish grows, teeth on the upper jaw are lost due to damage, while teeth on the lower jaw are overgrown by the surrounding bone. It has been suggested that this species exhibits pedomorphosis, that is, they retain many juvenile traits into adulthood. Some of these include an absence of a dorsal fin spine and a reduced number of ribs. S. auritus reaches a length of about 17.5 centimetres (6.9 in) TL.

As adults, S. auritus are filter-feeders, feeding primarily on phytoplankton and zooplankton. Stomachs of fish have been examined to contain zooplankton, chironomids and debris.

These fish are oviparous and the eggs are unguarded.
