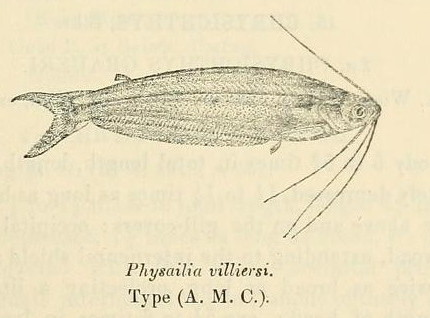
- 'Parailia occidentalis

Scientific classification
- Domain: Eukaryota
- Kingdom: Animalia
- Phylum: Chordata
- Class: Actinopterygii
- Order: Siluriformes
- Family: Schilbeidae
- Genus: Parailia; Boulenger, 1899

Type species
- Paralillia congica Boulenger, 1899

= Parailia =

Genus of fishes

Parailia is a genus of schilbid catfishes native to Africa. They grow up to 12 cm long.

== Species ==
There are currently five recognized species in this genus:

- Parailia congica Boulenger, 1899
- Parailia occidentalis (Pellegrin, 1901)
- Parailia pellucida (Boulenger, 1901) (Glass schilbid)
- Parailia somalensis (Vinciguerra, 1897) (Somalia glass catfish)
- Parailia spiniserrata Svensson, 1933
