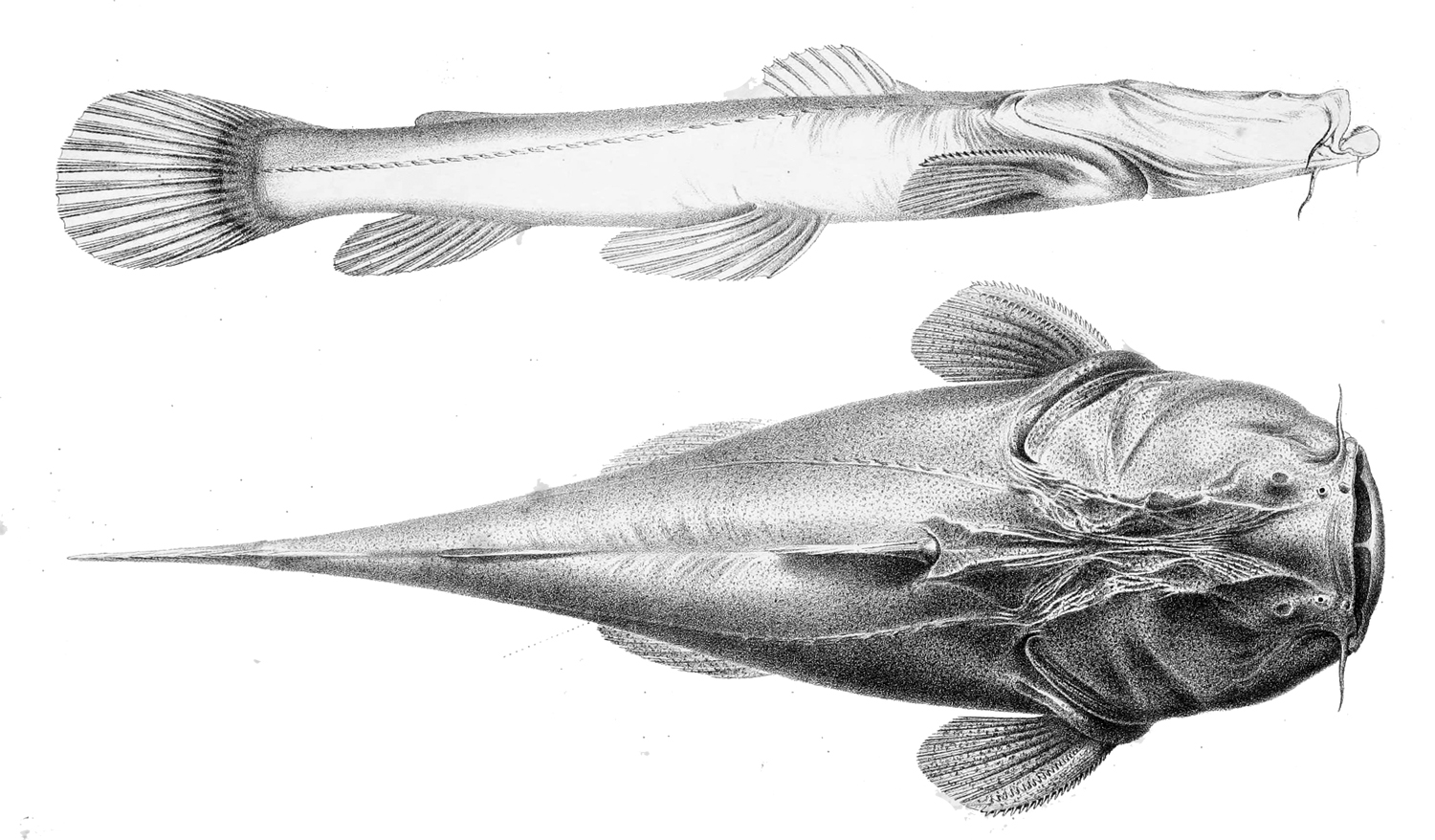

Scientific classification
- Kingdom: Animalia
- Phylum: Chordata
- Class: Actinopterygii
- Order: Siluriformes
- Family: Pseudopimelodidae
- Genus: Lophiosilurus; Steindachner, 1876

Type species
- Lophiosilurus alexandri Steindachner 1876

Synonyms
- Cephalosilurus Haseman, 1911

= Lophiosilurus =

Genus of catfish

Lophiosilurus is a genus of catfish in the family Pseudopimelodidae, which is endemic to South America. The genus was long thought to be monotypic, with L. alexandri as its only species, but a 2021 study determined the genus Cephalosilurus to be paraphyletic with respects to L. alexandri; consequently, Eschmeyer's Catalog of Fishes considers Cephalosilurus as a junior synonym of Lophiosilurus, though the World Register of Marine Species/FishBase retains two species in the former.

The following species are accepted by EcOF (species retained in Cephalosilurus by WoRMS are marked with C):

- Lophiosilurus albomarginatus (C. H. Eigenmann, 1912) (Tukeit, Guyana)
- Lophiosilurus alexandri (C. H. Eigenmann, 1912) (São Francisco River)
- Lophiosilurus apurensis (Mees, 1978) (Rio Arichuna, Apure)
- Lophiosilurus fowleri Haseman, 1911 (São Francisco River basin) C
- Lophiosilurus nigricaudus (Mees, 1974) (Sipaliwini District, Suriname) C

== Phylogeny ==
The following cladogram is based on a 2021 phylogenetic study of morphology that lumped Cephalosilurus into Lophiosilurus:

- Ictaluridae
- - Heptapteridae
  - - Pimelodidae
    - Pseudopimelodidae
      - Batrochoglaninae
        - - Microglanis parahybae
          - Batrochoglanis raninus
        - - Lophiosilurus albomarginatus
          - - Lophiosilurus nigricaudus
            - - Lophiosilurus apurensis
              - - Lophiosilurus alexandri
                - Lophiosilurus fowleri
      - Pseudopimelodinae
