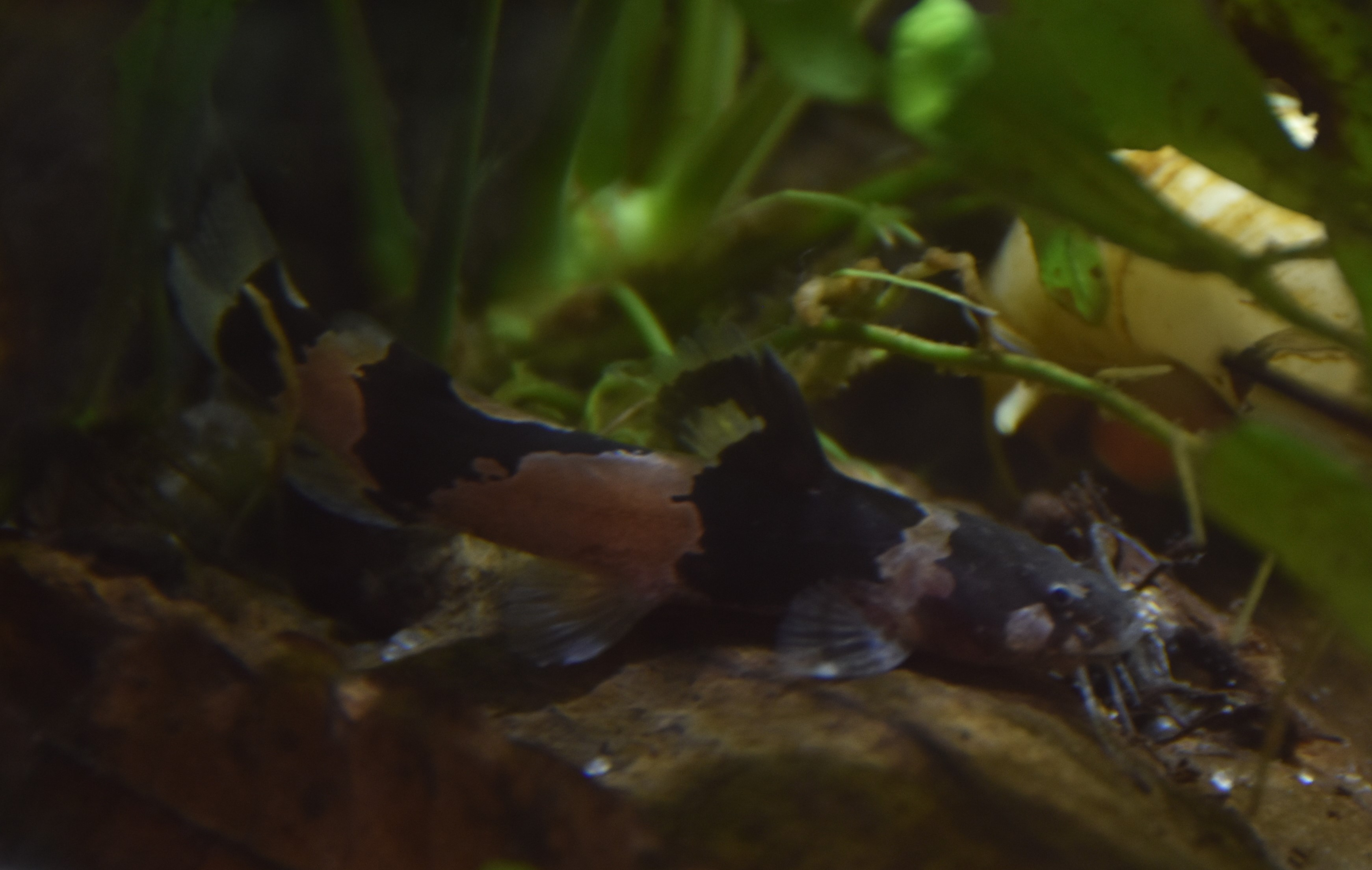
- A specimen in a home aquarium

Scientific classification
- Kingdom: Animalia
- Phylum: Chordata
- Class: Actinopterygii
- Order: Siluriformes
- Family: Pseudopimelodidae
- Genus: Microglanis
- Species: M. iheringi

Binomial name
- Microglanis iheringi A. L. Gomes, 1946

= Microglanis iheringi =

Species of fish

Microglanis iheringi is a species of South American catfish described by Alcides Lourenço Gomes in 1945. The species belongs to the genus Microglanis, a group of catfishes that are native to South America and which are distributed widely throughout the region. M. iheringi is endemic to the Orinoco river basin and populations are present in parts of Colombia and Venezuela. One estimate places the total population at more than 10,000 individuals.

The species inhabits freshwater rivers, streams, and lagoons which are usually clear and flowing. It is typically demersal and insectivorous, primarily feeding on ants. Standard length for an individual is about 60 millimeters. A single female may produce nearly 650 eggs in a breeding season.

Specimens may be identified distinctly from other species in the genus by its "bar-shaped blotch on caudal-fin base" and a "lateral line reaching a vertical through adipose-fin origin"

The International Union for Conservation of Nature listed M. iheringi as a least concern for extinction as of 2020, and noted that it does not face any specific threats. The species is popular among home aquarium hobbyists and is exported outside its native range.

== Etymology ==
The fish is named in honor of a former teacher of Gomes, the Brazilian ichthyologist, Rodolpho von Ihering (1883-1939).
