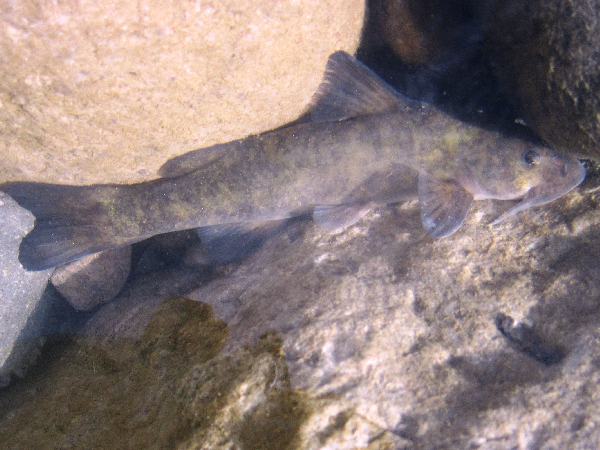

Conservation status
- Endangered (IUCN 3.1)

Scientific classification
- Kingdom: Animalia
- Phylum: Chordata
- Class: Actinopterygii
- Division: Teleostei
- Order: Siluriformes
- Suborder: Diplomystoidei
- Family: Diplomystidae
- Genus: Diplomystes
- Species: D. nahuelbutaensis

Binomial name
- Diplomystes nahuelbutaensis Arratia, 1987

= Diplomystes nahuelbutaensis =

Species of fish

Diplomystes nahuelbutaensis is a species of freshwater ray-finned fish belonging to the family Diplomystidae, the velvet catfishes. This fish is endemic to Chile where it occurs in the Bío-Bío River basin and the Imperial River, as well as some coastal basins in the Biobío Region. It grows to a length of 26.0 centimetres (10.2 in) TL.
