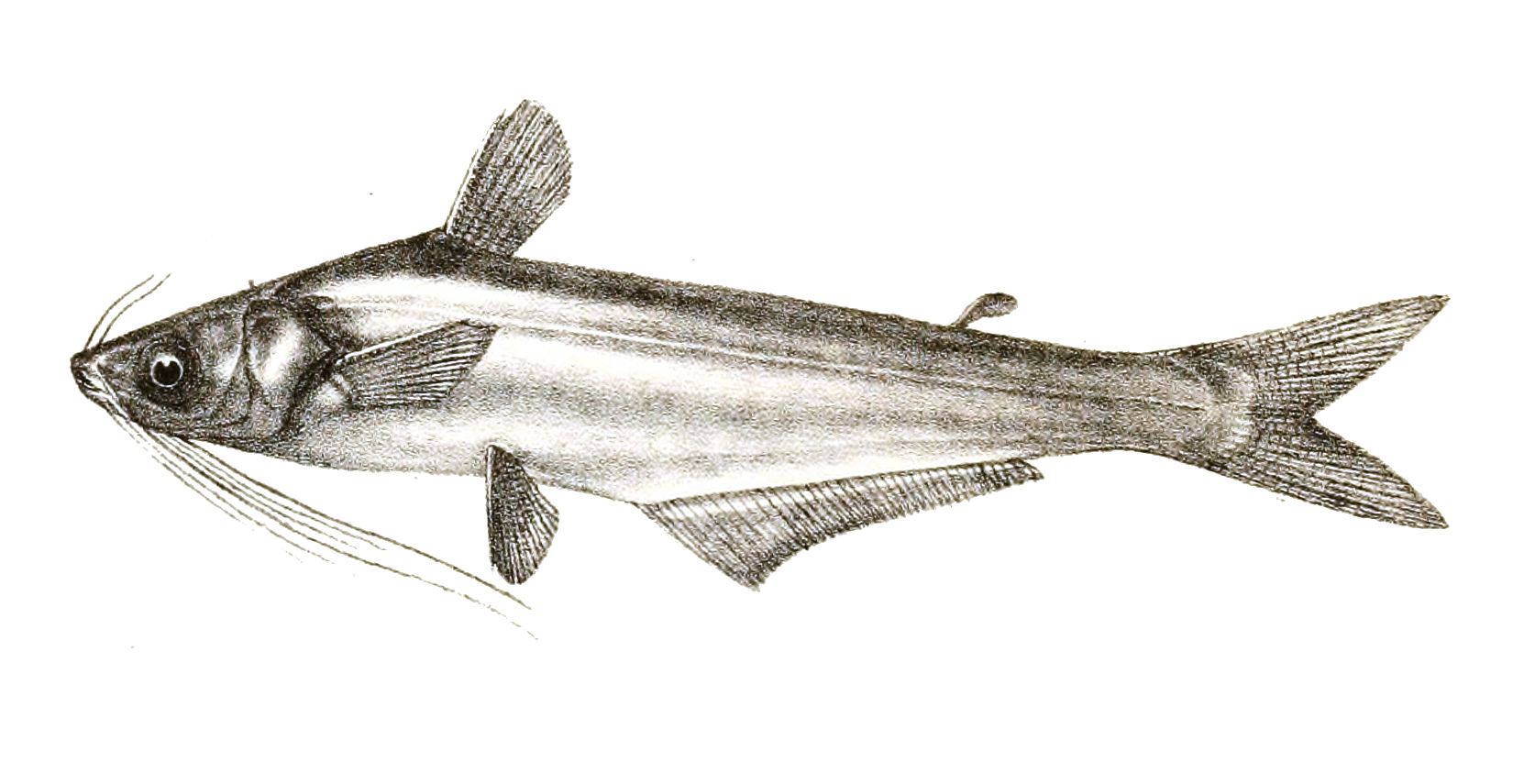
- Pseudotropius sykesii

Scientific classification
- Kingdom: Animalia
- Phylum: Chordata
- Class: Actinopterygii
- Order: Siluriformes
- Family: Horabagridae
- Genus: Pseudeutropius; Bleeker, 1862

Type species
- Eutropius brachypopterus Bleeker, 1858

= Pseudeutropius =

Genus of fishes

Pseudeutropius is a genus of catfishes conventionally placed in the family Schilbeidae but recent work has suggested it be placed in the newer family Horabagridae, the genus is native to Asia.

== Species ==
There are currently 4 recognized species in this genus:

- Pseudeutropius brachypopterus (Bleeker, 1858)
- Pseudeutropius indigens H. H. Ng & Vidthayanon, 2011
- Pseudeutropius mitchelli Günther, 1864
- Pseudeutropius moolenburghae M. C. W. Weber & de Beaufort, 1913
