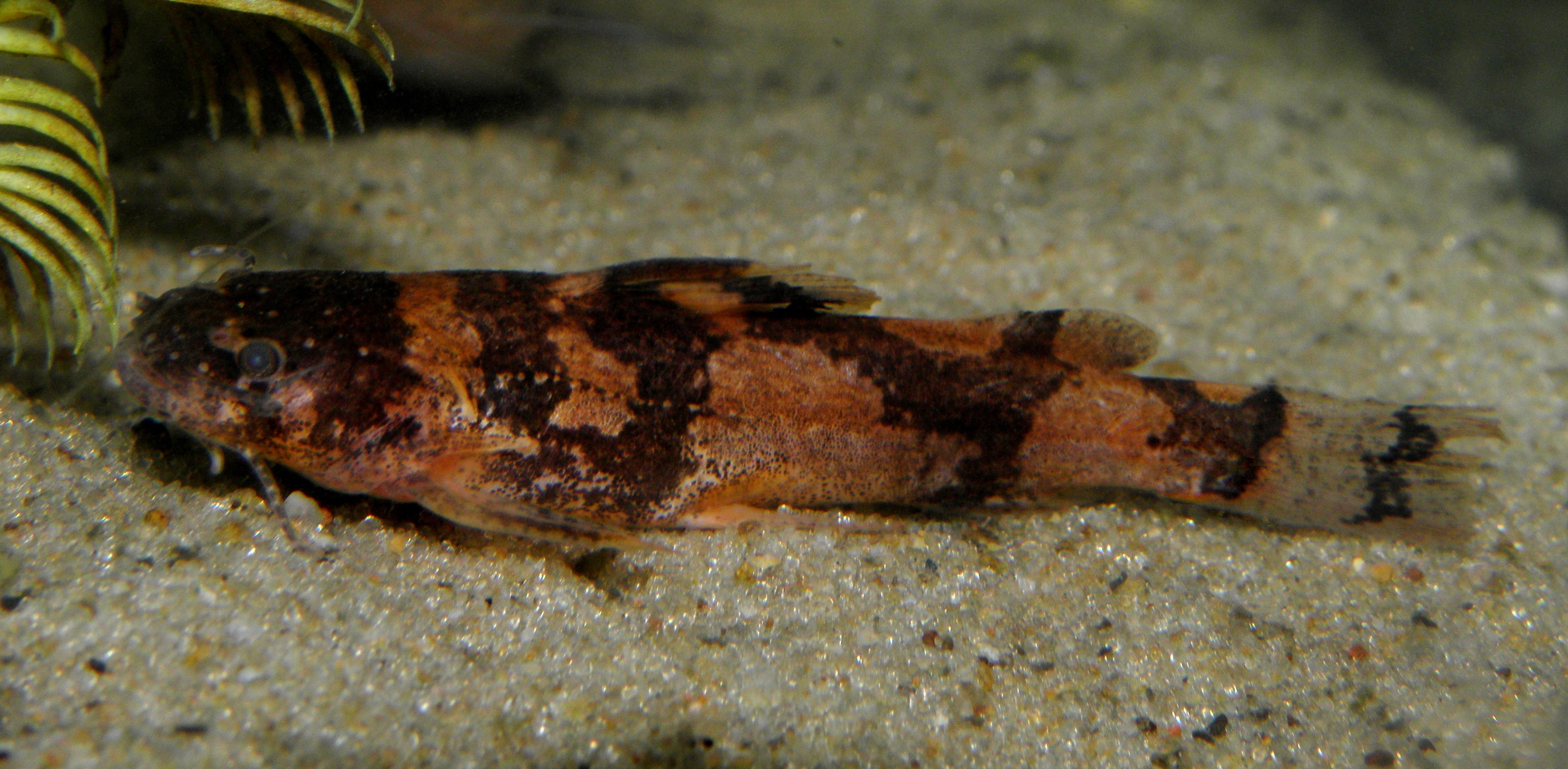
- Microglanis sp.

Scientific classification
- Kingdom: Animalia
- Phylum: Chordata
- Class: Actinopterygii
- Order: Siluriformes
- Family: Pseudopimelodidae
- Genus: Microglanis; C. H. Eigenmann, 1912

Type species
- Microglanis poecilus Eigenmann, 1912

= Microglanis =

Genus of fishes

Microglanis is a genus of fish in the family Pseudopimelodidae native to South America. This genus has the widest distribution within its family, with species ranging from the Guianas to Venezuela; western slope of the Andes in Ecuador and Peru to the Río de La Plata basin in Argentina. They occur eastward to the Orinoco and Amazon basins. It is also present in the eastern coastal rivers of Brazil.

== Species ==
There are currently 31 recognized species in this genus:

- Microglanis ater C. G. E. Ahl, 1936
- Microglanis berbixae Tobes, Falconí-López, Valdiviezo-Rivera & Provenzano, 2020
- Microglanis carlae Vera-Alcaraz, da Graça & Shibatta, 2008
- Microglanis cibelae L. R. Malabarba & Mahler, 1998
- Microglanis cottoides (Boulenger, 1891)
- Microglanis eurystoma L. R. Malabarba & Mahler, 1998
- Microglanis garavelloi Shibatta & Benine, 2005
- Microglanis iheringi A. L. Gomes, 1946
- Microglanis leniceae Shibatta, 2016
- Microglanis leptostriatus H. Mori & Shibatta, 2006
- Microglanis lucenai Lehmann A., Bartzen & Malabarba, 2024
- Microglanis lundbergi Jarduli & Shibatta, 2013
- Microglanis maculatus Shibatta, 2014
- Microglanis malabarbai Bertaco & A. R. Cardoso, 2005
- Microglanis minutus Ottoni, Mattos & Barbosa, 2010
- Microglanis nigripinnis Bizerril & Peres-Neto, 1992
- Microglanis nigrolineatus Terán, Jarduli, F. Alonso, Mirande & Shibatta, 2016
- Microglanis oliveirai W. B. G. Ruiz & Shibatta, 2011
- Microglanis parahybae (Steindachner, 1880)
- Microglanis pataxo Sarmento-Soares, Martins-Pinheiro, Aranda & Chamon, 2006
- Microglanis pellopterygius Mees, 1978
- Microglanis pleriqueater Mattos, Ottoni & Barbosa, 2013
- Microglanis poecilus C. H. Eigenmann, 1912
- Microglanis reikoae W. B. G. Ruiz, 2016
- Microglanis robustus W. B. G. Ruiz & Shibatta, 2010
- Microglanis secundus Mees, 1974
- Microglanis sparsus W. B. G. Ruiz, 2016
- Microglanis variegatus C. H. Eigenmann & Henn, 1914
- Microglanis xerente W. B. G. Ruiz, 2016
- Microglanis xylographicus W. B. G. Ruiz & Shibatta, 2011
- Microglanis zonatus C. H. Eigenmann & W. R. Allen, 1942
