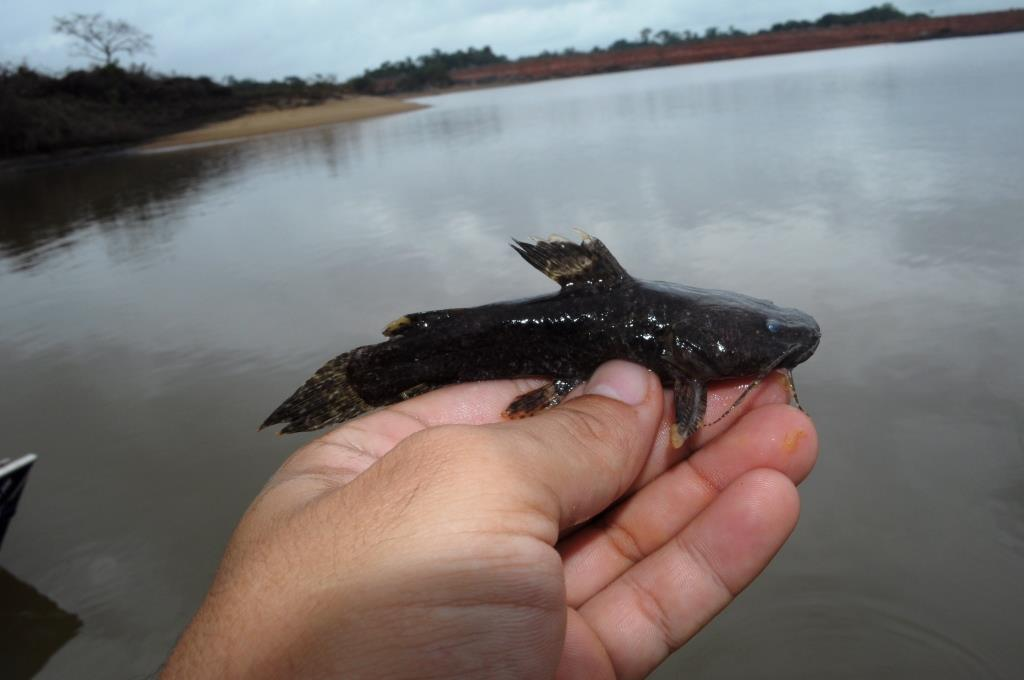
- Batrochoglanis vilosus

Scientific classification
- Kingdom: Animalia
- Phylum: Chordata
- Class: Actinopterygii
- Order: Siluriformes
- Family: Pseudopimelodidae
- Genus: Batrochoglanis; Gill, 1858

Type species
- Pimelodus raninus Valenciennes 1840

= Batrochoglanis =

Genus of fishes

Batrochoglanis is a small genus of catfishes (order Siluriformes) of the family Pseudopimelodidae.

== Species ==
There are currently seven recognized species in this genus:

- Batrochoglanis acanthochiroides (Güntert, 1942)
- Batrochoglanis castaneus Shibatta, 2019
- Batrochoglanis labrosus Shibatta, 2024
- Batrochoglanis melanurus Shibatta & Pavanelli, 2005
- Batrochoglanis raninus (Valenciennes, 1840)
- Batrochoglanis transmontanus (Regan, 1913)
- Batrochoglanis villosus (C. H. Eigenmann, 1912)

== Distribution ==
Batrochoglanis species are known and distributed throughout the Amazon basin, rivers of the Ecuadorian and Colombian Pacific coast, the northern region of South America, and the Paraguay River basin. B. acanthochiroides is distributed in the Catatumbo River basin of the Maracaibo basin. B. melanurus is only known from its type locality in the Paraguay River basin of Brazil. B. raninus is found in the Amazon River basin, Guyana, and French Guiana. B. transmontanus originates from Baudó, San Juan, Patía and Durango river basins. B. villosus is found in the Demerara River of the Essequibo basin, Orinoco, and Amazon River basins.

== Description ==
Species of this genus have rounded, wider than deep bodies; large heads, rounded in dorsal view; pelvic fins originating at vertical line through the end of the dorsal fin; short caudal peduncles, with caudal fin procurrent rays close to adipose and anal fins; emarginated caudal fins, with rounded lobes, or completely rounded; incomplete lateral lines, sometimes surpassing the adipose-fin end, but never reaching the caudal fin.

Three color patterns of the caudal fin in Batrochoglanis species are known. The first pattern, in B. raninus, B. transmontanus and B. acanthochiroides, is a light caudal fin, with a dark band on the posterior third. The second pattern, in B. villosus, is a light caudal fin, with dark dots irregularly distributed. The third pattern, found in B. melanurus, has the caudal fin completely dark. The coloration pattern is useful for separating species, but apparently does not allow inferences about phylogenetic relationships to be safely made, since this character is widespread in this family.

B. acanthochiroides, the largest species, grows to 80 centimetres (31 in) TL. B. melanurus has a maximum length of 13.7 cm (5.39 in) SL. B. raninus reaches a length of 20 cm (7.9 in) SL. B. transmontanus grows to a length of 25 cm (9.8 in) TL. B. villosus reaches a length of 14.8 cm (5.8 in) TL.

== Ecology ==
B. transmontanus is recorded to live in rivers. B. raninus commonly occurs in creeks as well as in rivers. It is found in very shady, deep zones of rivers where the current is slow, the bottom is shady, and the gravel is covered with plant debris. During the day, B. raninus lies hidden under branches or rocks. It hunts by stalking, swallowing prey within its range. When young, B. raninus feeds on micro-crustaceans and aquatic insect larvae, then shifts its diet to fishes of notable size.
