= Diplomystes chilensis =

Conservation status
- Data Deficient (IUCN 3.1)

Scientific classification
- Kingdom: Animalia
- Phylum: Chordata
- Class: Actinopterygii
- Order: Siluriformes
- Suborder: Diplomystoidei
- Family: Diplomystidae
- Genus: Diplomystes
- Species: D. chilensis

Binomial name
- Diplomystes chilensis (Molina, 1782)

Synonyms
- Silurus chilensis Molina, 1782; Arius papillosus Valenciennes, 1840; Arius cacharioides Leybold, 1859; Arius villosus Philippi, 1866; Arius squalus Philippi, 1866; Arius micropterus Philippi, 1866; Arius synodon Philippi, 1866

Species of fish

Diplomystes chilensis, the tollo or tollo de agua dulce, is a species of freshwater ray-finned fish belonging to the family Diplomystidae, the velvet catfishes. This fish is endemic to Chile where it is found in the area of Valparaíso and Santiago. It grows to a maximum total length of 23 centimetres (9.1 in). This species was previously considered to be extinct but in 2000 it was reported that two specimens had been collected from the Rio Cachapoal in the Rapel basin.
