= Pseudomystus =

Scientific classification
- Kingdom: Animalia
- Phylum: Chordata
- Class: Actinopterygii
- Order: Siluriformes
- Family: Bagridae
- Genus: Pseudomystus; Jayaram, 1968

Type species
- Bagrus stenomus Valenciennes, 1840

Genus of fishes

Pseudomystus is a genus of catfishes (order Siluriformes) of the family Bagridae.

== Taxonomy ==
Pseudomystus was originally described by Jayaram in 1968 as a subgenus to Leiocassis. It was elevated to genus rank in 1991 by Mo. There is evidence to indicate that these two genera are not even closely related. There is the possibility that Pseudomystus as currently understood may not be monophyletic.

P. carnosus, P. fumosus and P. moeschii are hypothesized to form a monophyletic group.

However, Pseudomystus has been treated in some recent literature as a synonym of Leiocassis.

== Species ==
There are currently 20 described species in this genus:

- Pseudomystus bomboides Kottelat, 2000
- Pseudomystus breviceps (Regan, 1913)
- Pseudomystus flavipinnis H. H. Ng & Rachmatika, 1999
- Pseudomystus fumosus H. H. Ng & K. K. P. Lim, 2005
- Pseudomystus funebris H. H. Ng, 2010
- Pseudomystus heokhuii K. K. P. Lim & H. H. Ng, 2008
- Pseudomystus inornatus (Boulenger, 1894)
- Pseudomystus leiacanthus (M. C. W. Weber & de Beaufort, 1912) (Dwarf bumblebee catfish)
- Pseudomystus mahakamensis (Vaillant, 1902)
- Pseudomystus moeschii (Boulenger, 1890)
- Pseudomystus myersi (T. R. Roberts, 1989)
- Pseudomystus nuchalis H. H. Ng, 2025
- Pseudomystus robustus (Inger & P. K. Chin, 1959)
- Pseudomystus rugosus (Regan, 1913)
- Pseudomystus siamensis (Regan, 1913) (Asian bumblebee catfish)
- Pseudomystus sobrinus H. H. Ng & Freyhof, 2005
- Pseudomystus stenogrammus H. H. Ng & Siebert, 2005
- Pseudomystus stenomus (Valenciennes, 1840)
- Pseudomystus tuberosus H. H. Ng & H. H. Tan, 2024
- Pseudomystus vaillanti (Regan, 1913)

== Distribution and habitat ==
Pseudomystus species inhabit swamps, streams and rivers throughout Southeast Asia. The genus is distributed in Thailand, Vietnam, Malaysia, and Indonesia, on Java, Sumatra, and Borneo, with only P. siamensis and P. bomboides known from north of the Thai Peninsula. The greatest number of species is found in Borneo (about ten species), followed by Sumatra (about seven).

== Description ==
Pseudomystus species are small- to mid-sized bagrid catfishes.

Many Pseudomystus species are beautiful fishes with colour patterns of striking contrast, with light bands and/or blotches on a dark background on the body and fins, with the pattern reversed on some fins in some species. This coloration leads them to be known as bumblebee catfish in the aquarium trade. Some species were described to have a uniform colour have a banded colouration when juvenile. P. stenogrammus and P. mahakamensis lack any blotches or bands on the body, instead possessing a clearly defined midlateral stripe on a dark background; this stripe is thinner in P. stenogrammus.

All Pseudomystus can be sexed in the typical bagrid fashion (by the presence of a genital papilla in males) and the males' genital papilla is even more distinct than in many other bagrids.

== In the aquarium ==
The genus Pseudomystus includes a number of ornamental species kept in the fishkeeping hobby, in which they are commonly called bumblebee catfish or false bumblebee catfish. These nocturnal fish may disappear into an aquarium for months. These catfish can consume smaller tankmates. They do well in a community set-up. However, as they are territorial each individual will need its own cave; damaged tails due to territorial disputes is a sign there are not enough retreats. They are highly adaptable and can live in almost any water condition (though extremes should be avoided). There have been no known spawnings in captivity.
