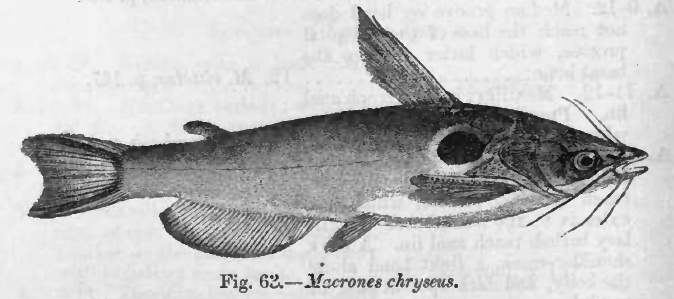
- Horabagrus brachysoma

Scientific classification
- Kingdom: Animalia
- Phylum: Chordata
- Class: Actinopterygii
- Division: Teleostei
- Order: Siluriformes
- Family: Horabagridae; Jayaram, 2006

Genera
- Horabagrus Jayaram, 1955; Pachypterus Swainson, 1838; Platytropius Bleeker, 1862; Pseudeutropius Bleeker, 1862

= Horabagridae =

Family of fishes

Horabagridae is a family of catfishes containing four genera, Horabagrus, Pachypterus, Platytropius and Pseudeutropius. Horobagrus has been more usually assigned to the family Bagridae and sometimes it has been suggested it is closer to the Schilbeidae which is where the other two genera have been more conventionally placed.

The following cladogram is based on a 2022 maximum likelihood phylogenetic tree of catfishes:

- Siluroidei
  - - - - - "Big Africa" clade
          - - - - Ictaluridae
                - Cranoglanididae
              - - Pangasiidae
                - Austroglanididae
            - Ariidae
        - - Siluridae
          - - Pimelodidae
            - Pseudopimelodidae
      - "Big Asia" clade
        - - Sisoridae
          - Amblycipitidae
        - - Bagridae
          - - Horabagridae
            - Ailiidae
    - - - Clariidae
        - Heteropneustidae
      - - - Auchenipteridae
          - Doradidae
        - Aspredinidae
  - - - Plotosidae
      - Chacidae
    - - Cetopsidae
      - Ritidae
- Diplomystoidei Diplomystidae
  Diplomystes
