= Raúl Adolfo Ringuelet =

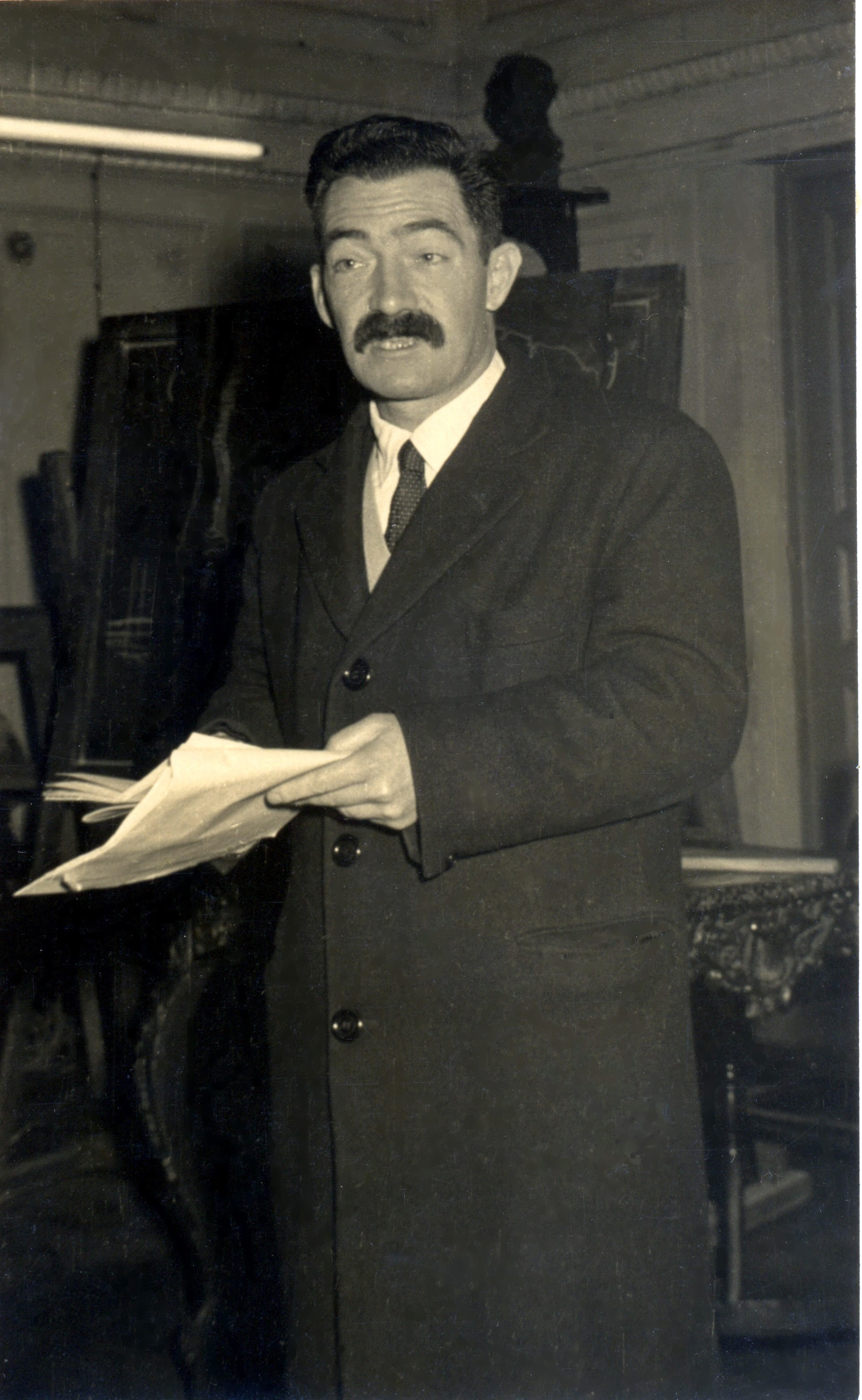
Raúl A. Ringuelet (1957)

Raúl Adolfo Ringuelet Ph.D. (1914 – 1982) was an Argentine zoologist.

Ringuelet published more than 100 scientific papers on the ecology, limnology, biogeography, and conservation of South American freshwaters, and was a mentor to a whole generation of Argentine biologists. Ringuelet's research interests were exceptionally broad, including numerous studies of leeches (Hirudinea), harvestmen spiders (Opiliones), crustaceans, chironomid flies and Neotropical fishes. The UNLP is named in his honor.

Ringuelet was born in La Plata, September 10, 1914. He graduated in 1939 with a Doctor of Natural Sciences at the Institute of Museum, Universidad Nacional de La Plata (UNLP). Ringuelet published his first scientific work in 1936. Ringuelet went on to publish 17 works of Arachnology, with one relating to the Order Scorpiones and the others to the Order Opiliones, 44 papers on the Hirudinea leeches, 24 on various crustaceans, and 14 specifically on Biogeography.

Ringuelet held several professorships at the Universidad Nacional de La Plata: Adjunct professor of general Zoology (1944–1948), Acting Professor (1946–1947) and Head (1947–1955) Invertebrate Zoology, Professor Acting Zoogeography (1958), Vertebrate Zoology Professor (1957–1966), Professor of Ecology and Zoogeography (1960, per vitam in 1972) and Professor of Limnology (1969–1978). He was also Professor of Systematic Zoology in the Faculty of Natural Sciences, University of Buenos Aires (1956–1964).

In recognition of his career, the National University of La Plata was appointed Extraordinary Professor Emeritus degree (1980). From 1978 until his death Ringuelet was a Senior Researcher at the National Research Council (CONICET).

== Selected publications ==
- Ringuelet, R. A. 1948. Una nueva Aegla del nordeste argentino. Not. Mus. La Plata 13 Zool. (111): 203-208, 3 láms].
- Ringuelet, R. A. 1949. Consideraciones sobre las relaciones filogenéticas entre las especies del género Regla Leach (Decápodos Anomuros). Not. Mus. La Plata 14 Zool. (120): 111-118.
- Ringuelet, R.A. 1959. Los aracnidos Argentinos del orden Opiliones. Revista del Museo Argentino de Ciencias Naturales "Bernardino Rivadavia." Ciencias Zoologicas 5(2), 127–439, figs 1–62, plates 1–20.
- Ringuelet, R. A. 1961. Rasgos fundamentales de la Zoogeografía de la Argentina. Physis 22 (63): 151-170.
- Ringuelet, R. A. 1968. Biogéographie des Copépodes d’eau douce de l’Argentine. Biologie de l` Amérique Australe 4: 261-267.
- Ringuelet, R. A., 1975. Zoogeografía y Ecología de los peces de aguas continentales de la Argentina y consideraciones sobre las áreas ictiológicas de América del Sur. Ecosur 2 (3): 122, 10.
- Ringuelet, R. A. 1981. Some advances in the knowledge of Neotropical Leeches. Limnobios 2 (4): 226.
- Ringuelet, R. A. 1980. Aportes al conocimiento de las sanguijuelas del género Haementeria De Filippi, 1849 (Hirudinea, Glossiphoniidae). Limnobios 2 (1), 50-53.
- Ringuelet, R. A. 1980. Un Hirudíneo con marsupio de la región andina de Jujuy, Argentina (Maiabdella Batracophila n. g., n. sp., Glossiphoniidae) Limnobios 2 (1), 68-71, 2 figs.
- López, H. L., R. C. Menni, & R. A. Ringuelet, 1981. Bibliografía Ictiológica Argentina (1965–1981). Biología Acuática, La Plata, 1: 1-100.
