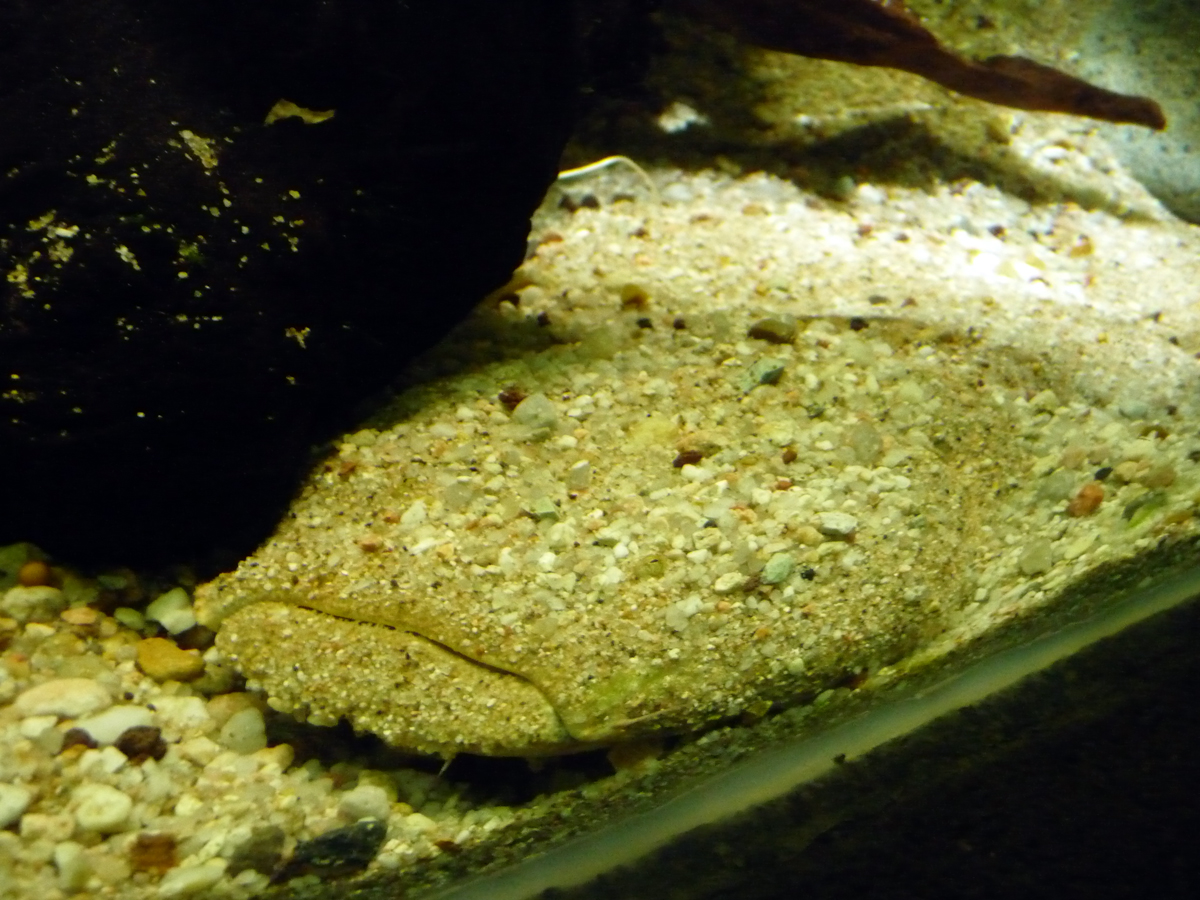
- Lophiosilurus alexandri

Scientific classification
- Kingdom: Animalia
- Phylum: Chordata
- Class: Actinopterygii
- Division: Teleostei
- Order: Siluriformes
- Superfamily: Pimelodoidea
- Family: Pseudopimelodidae; Fernández-Yépez & Antón, 1966

= Pseudopimelodidae =

Family of fishes

The Pseudopimelodidae are a small family (about 40 species) of catfishes known as the bumblebee catfishes or dwarf marbled catfishes. Some of these fish are popular aquarium fish.

== Description ==
These catfishes have wide mouths, small eyes, and short barbels. Their bold markings lead them to be commonly known as bumblebee catfishes or dwarf marbled catfishes. B. acanthochiroides grows to 80 cm (31 in) TL. However, most species are smaller; species of the genus Microglanis rarely exceed 70 mm (2.76 in) SL and are never over 80 mm (3.1 in) SL.

== Distribution ==
The Pseudopimelodidae are restricted to fresh water in South America, from the Atrato River in Colombia to Argentina in the Río de la Plata.

== Taxonomy ==
This family was formerly a subfamily of Pimelodidae. Pseudopimelodidae is a monophyletic group. Previously, the superfamily Pseudopimelodoidea was sister to superfamilies Sisoroidea + Loricarioidea. However, some evidence has shown this family, along with Pimelodidae, Heptapteridae, and Conorhynchos, may form a monophyletic assemblage, which contradicts the hypothesis that the former family Pimelodidae that included these families is a polyphyletic group.

The following genera are valid:

- Batrochoglanis Gill, 1858
- Cruciglanis Ortega-Lara & Lehmann A., 2006
- Lophiosilurus Steindachner, 1876
- Microglanis C. H. Eigenmann, 1912
- Rhyacoglanis Shibatta & Vari, 2017
- Pseudopimelodus Bleeker, 1858

The following cladogram is based on a 2021 phylogenetic study of morphology that lumped Cephalosilurus into Lophiosilurus:

- Ictaluridae
- - Heptapteridae
  - - Pimelodidae
    - Pseudopimelodidae
      - Batrochoglaninae
        - - Microglanis parahybae
          - Batrachoglanis raninus
        - - Lophiosilurus albomarginatus
          - - Lophiosilurus nigricaudus
            - - Lophiosilurus apurensis
              - - Lophiosilurus alexandri
                - Lophiosilurus fowleri
      - Pseudopimelodinae
        - - Cruciglanis pacifici
          - - Pseudopimelodus mangurus
            - Pseudopimelodus bufonius
        - - - Rhyacoglanis seminiger
            - Rhyacoglanis pulcher
          - - Rhyacoglanis paranensis
            - - Rhyacoglanis epiblepsis
              - Rhyacoglanis annulatus
