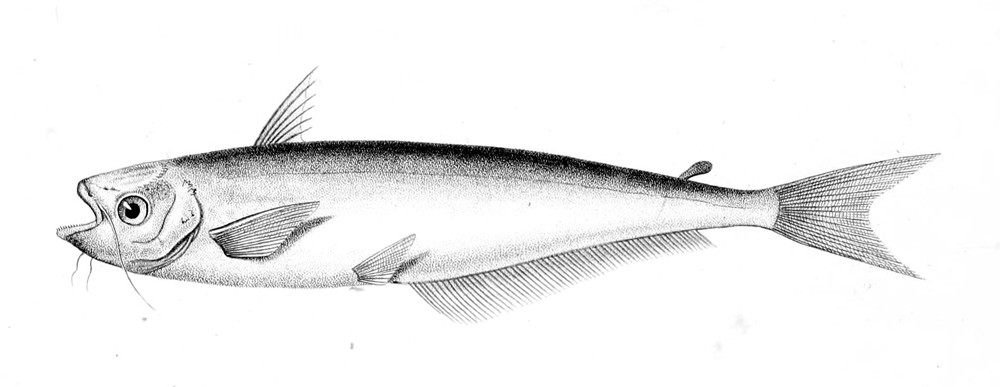
- Schilbe mystus

Scientific classification
- Kingdom: Animalia
- Phylum: Chordata
- Class: Actinopterygii
- Order: Siluriformes
- Family: Schilbeidae; Bleeker, 1858

Genera
- Irvineia Trewavas, 1943; Parailia Boulenger, 1899; Pareutropius Regan, 1920; Schilbe Oken, 1817; Siluranodon Bleeker, 1858

= Schilbeidae =

Family of fishes

Schilbeidae is a family of catfishes native to Africa and Asia. These fish tend to swim in open water.

Schilbid catfishes usually have dorsal fins with a short base and a spine, but Parailia lack a dorsal fin altogether. Most species also possess an adipose fin. The base of the anal fin is very long. There are usually four pairs of barbels. Several species lack anal fins.

The family name is sometimes spelled Schilbidae in scientific literature.
