= Ko Mak =

Ko Mak เกาะหมาก
- Subdistrict
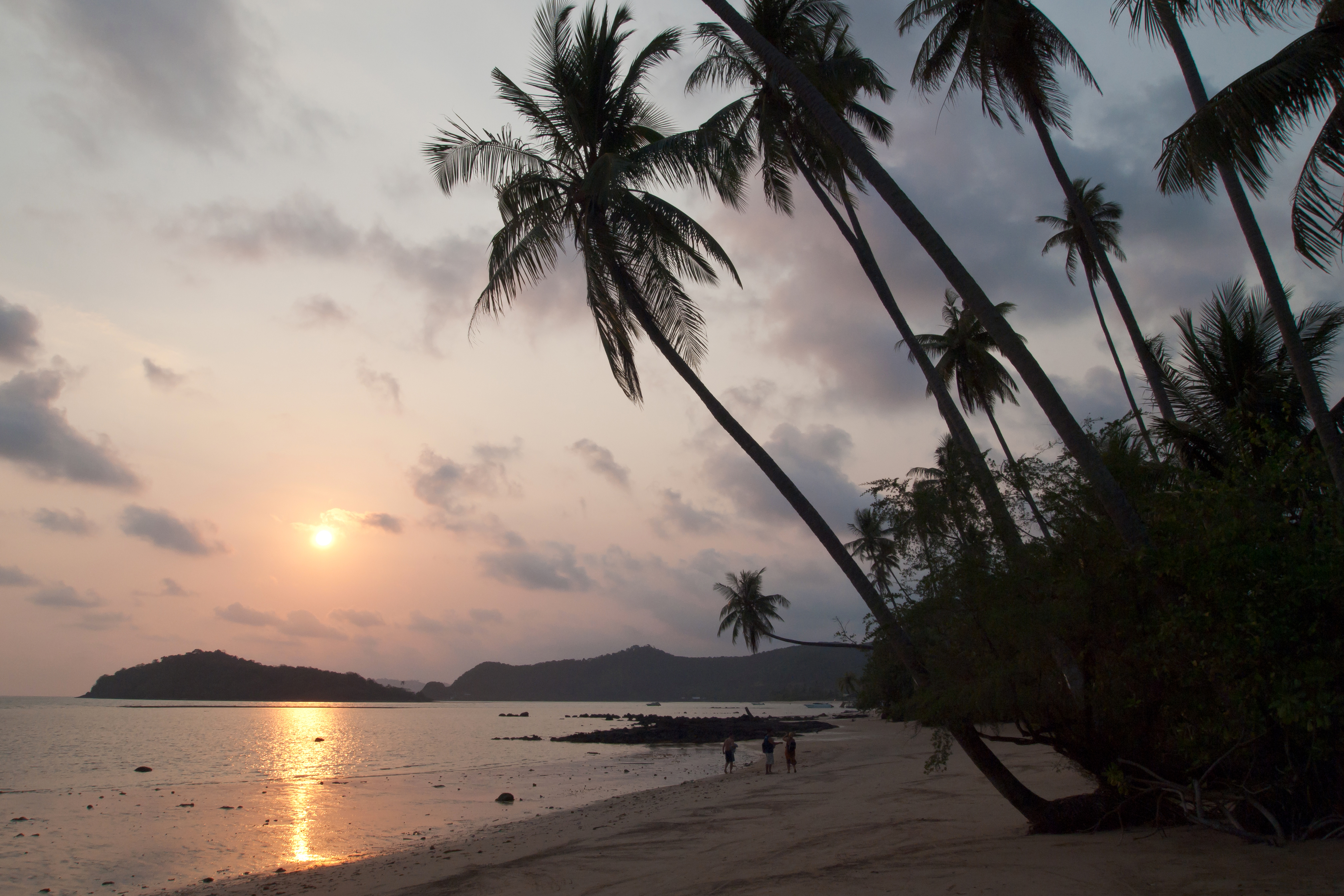

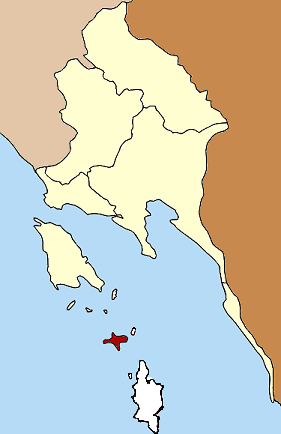
- Subdistrict location in Trat province
- Coordinates: 11°49′10″N 102°28′42″E
- Country: Thailand
- Province: Trat
- District: Ko Kut
- Time zone: UTC+7 (ICT)
- Postal code: 23120
- Geocode: 230504

Ko Mak (Thai: เกาะหมาก, pronounced [kɔ̀ʔ màːk]) is a small island of Trat province, in eastern Thailand. It is a subdistrict (tambon) of Ko Kut district. The island is named after the areca nut (หมาก), also known as the "betel nut".

== History ==
The first settler on the island was Chao Sua Seng, a Chinese Affairs Officer during the reign of King Rama V, who established a coconut plantation. He sold the plantation to Luang Prompakdii, also a Chinese Affairs Officer whose descendants own the land to this day. Luang Prompakdii and his children are known to have established more coconut and rubber plantations, effectively covering most of the arable land in these two sought-after exports.

The first attempt at attracting a tourism market was in 1974, when bungalows were built at on the east end of the Ban Ao Nid island. Infrastructure, specifically transport and telecommunications were in their early stages and as a result, it took some time for the tourism industry to become established on Ko Mak. By 1987 certain beaches and land were cleared and the first resorts were built.

Originally, the area of the Ko Kut district was part of the subdistrict (tambon) Ko Chang, Laem Ngop District. In 1952 the subdistrict Ko Mak was established covering the whole island, at that time divided into four villages (mubans). In 1980, three villages of Ko Mak were split off to create the subdistrict Ko Kut. On 1 April 1990 the government upgraded tambon Ko Kut together with tambon Ko Mak to a minor district (king amphoe).

On 15 May 2007, all of Thailand's 81 minor districts were upgraded to full districts. On 24 August the upgrade became official.

As local government entities, two tambon administrative organizations (TAO) were created in 2003 and 2004 respectively. The Tambon Council Ko Kut was upgraded to a TAO in 2003, and for Ko Mak in 2004.

== Geography ==
The island of Ko Mak is in the east of the Gulf of Thailand, 35 km (22 mi) from the mainland, and is the third largest island in Trat Province, after Ko Chang and Ko Kut. With an area of 16 km^{2} (6.2 sq mi), Ko Mak has 27 km (17 mi) of coastline, many long sandy beaches, and a few hills. The island is home to approximately 400 locals and renowned for its beautiful beaches, having been included in the UK's Sunday Times 10 most beautiful beaches list in 2006. Ko Mak has a temple, a primary school, three fishing villages, a market, and a health center.

It is possible to walk to Ko Kham, a smaller island less than 1 km (0.62 mi) northwest of Ko Mak, at low tide.

== Tourism ==
The island is small and flat with coconut plantations and mangrove vegetation along the coastline. There are approximately 15 small-scale resorts on Ko Mak. Both Ko Kham and Ko Phi can easily be reached with sea kayak or boat rental from the resorts on the northwest coast and are snorkeling destinations.

Ko Mak has no pubs, bars with noisy music at night, or liquor stores. The campaign of using less plastic is promoted and plastic can be recycled. Locals encourage tourists to collect trash from the beach every Saturday as part of Ko Mak's Trash Hero activities.

The descendants of the five original families of Ko Mak still live on the island. The occupations of those ancestors were collecting mak ling (Areca triandra), and cultivating coconut and rubber plantations.

== Gallery ==
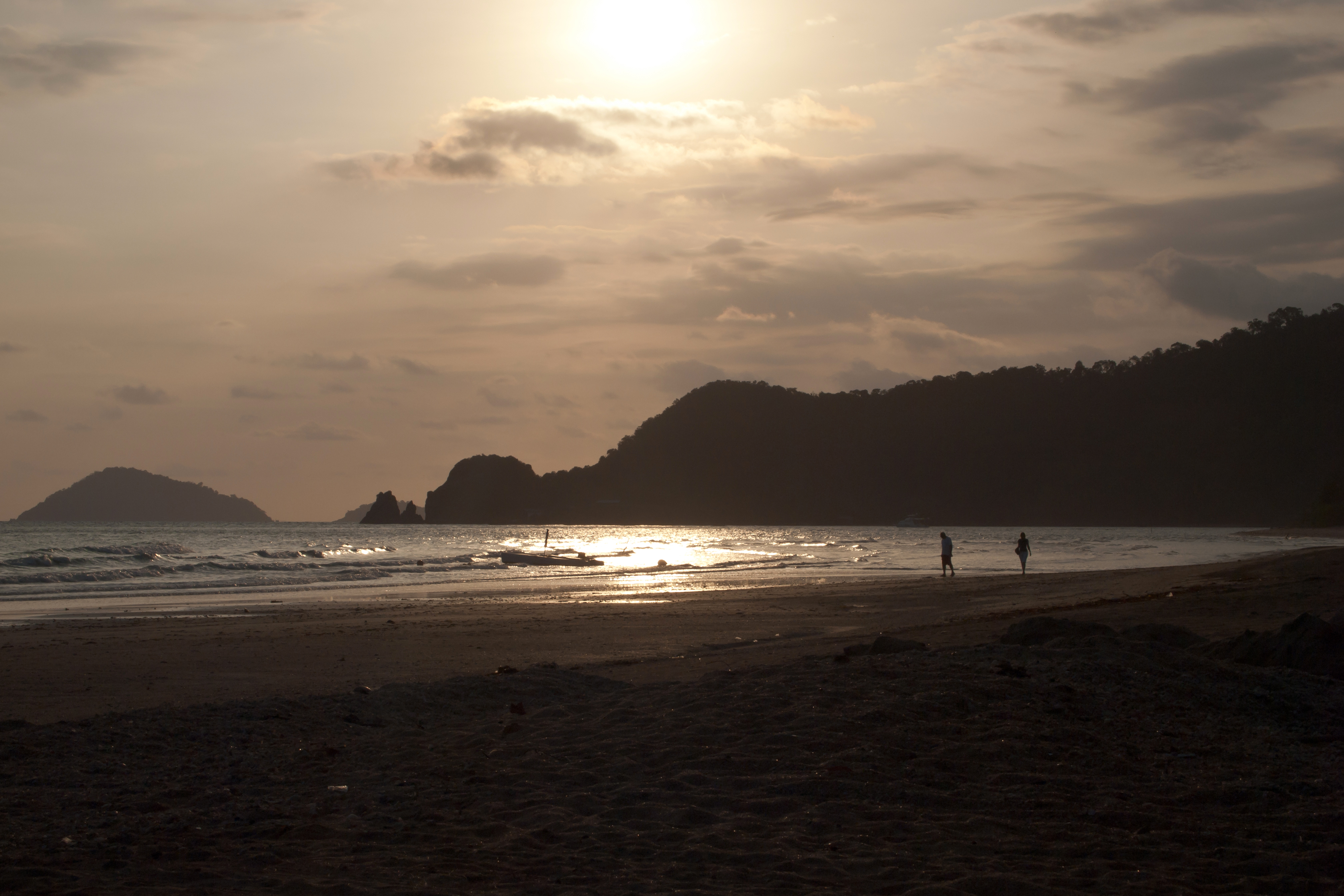
Hills on the west side

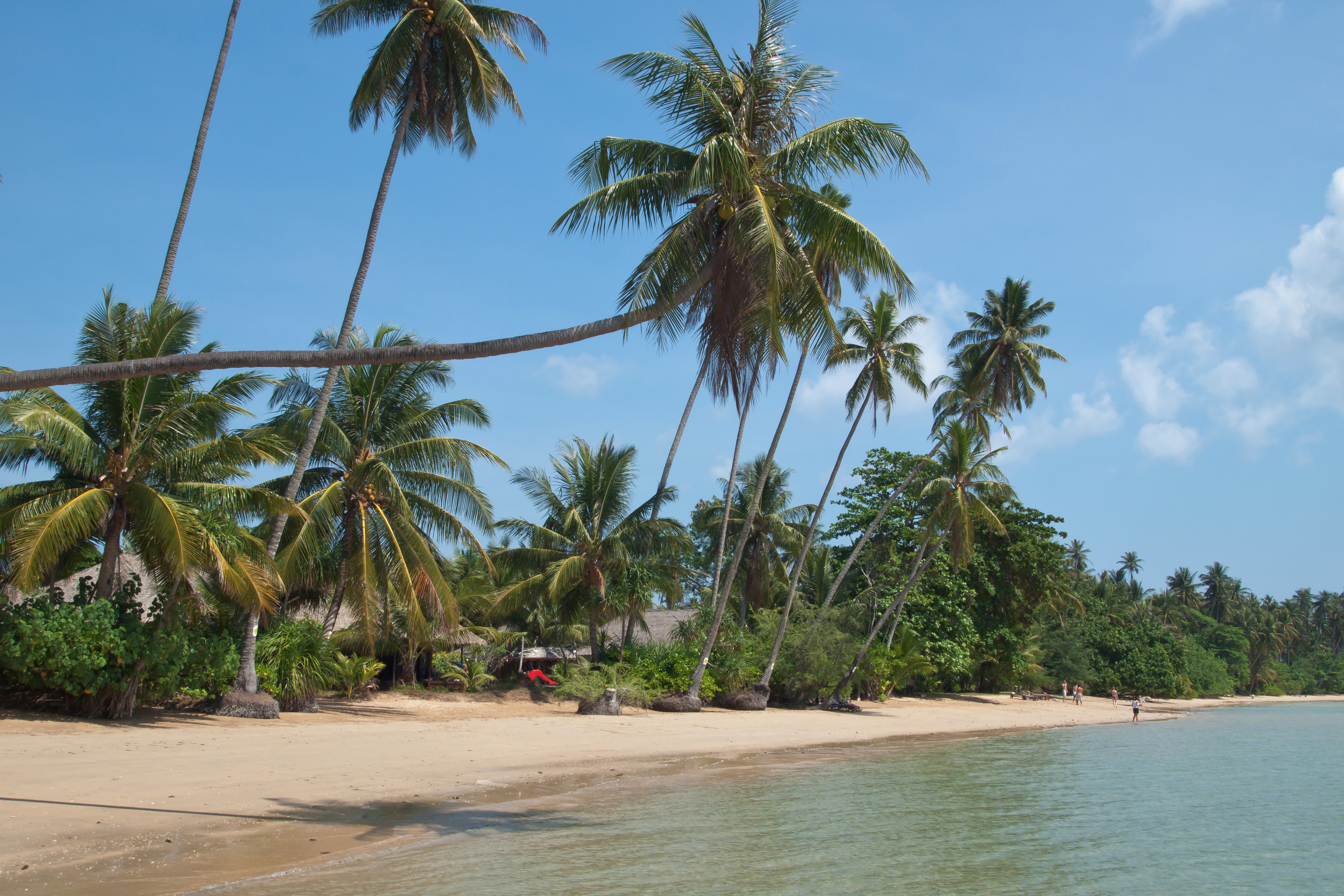
Palms on the beach

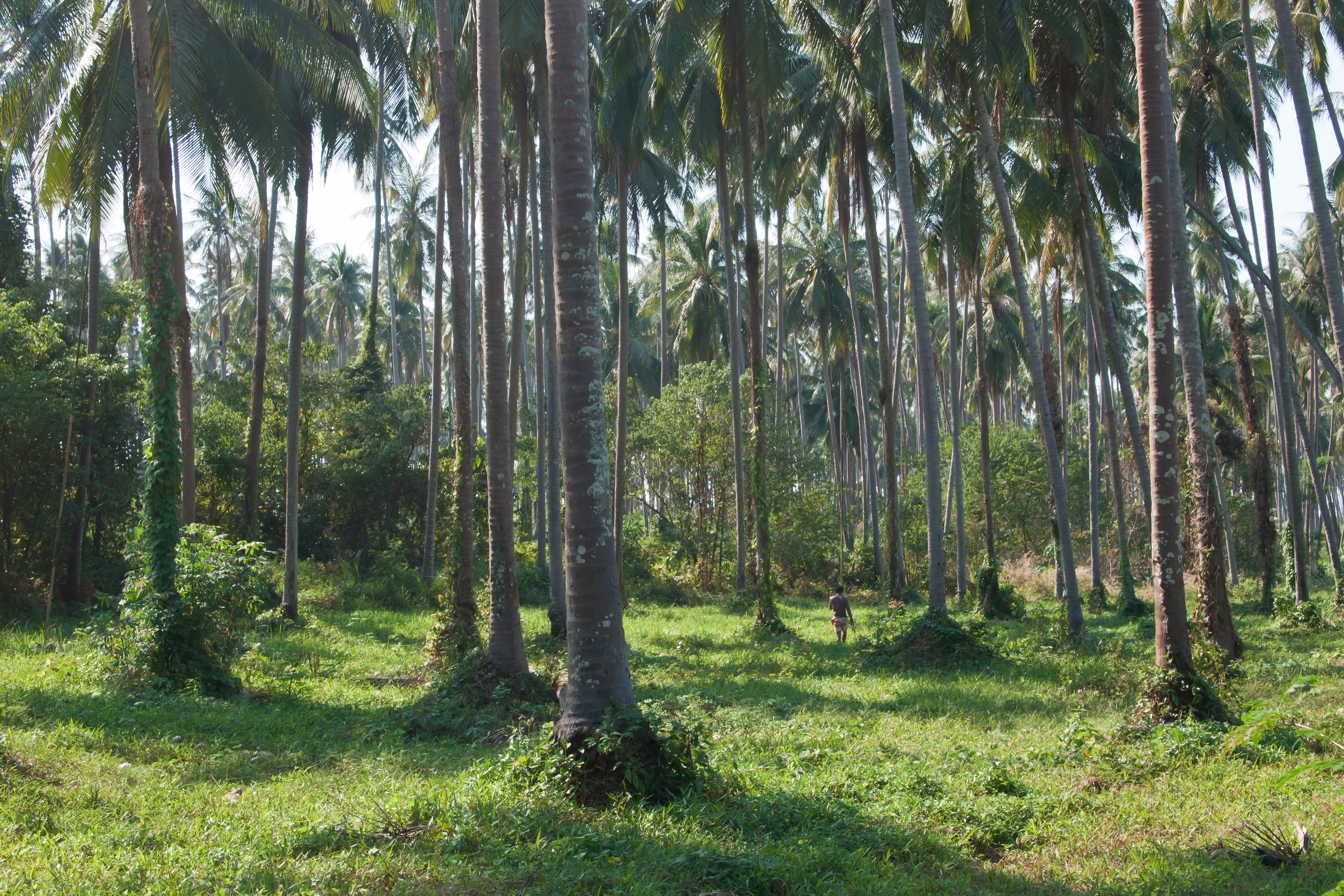
Coconut palm plantation in the south

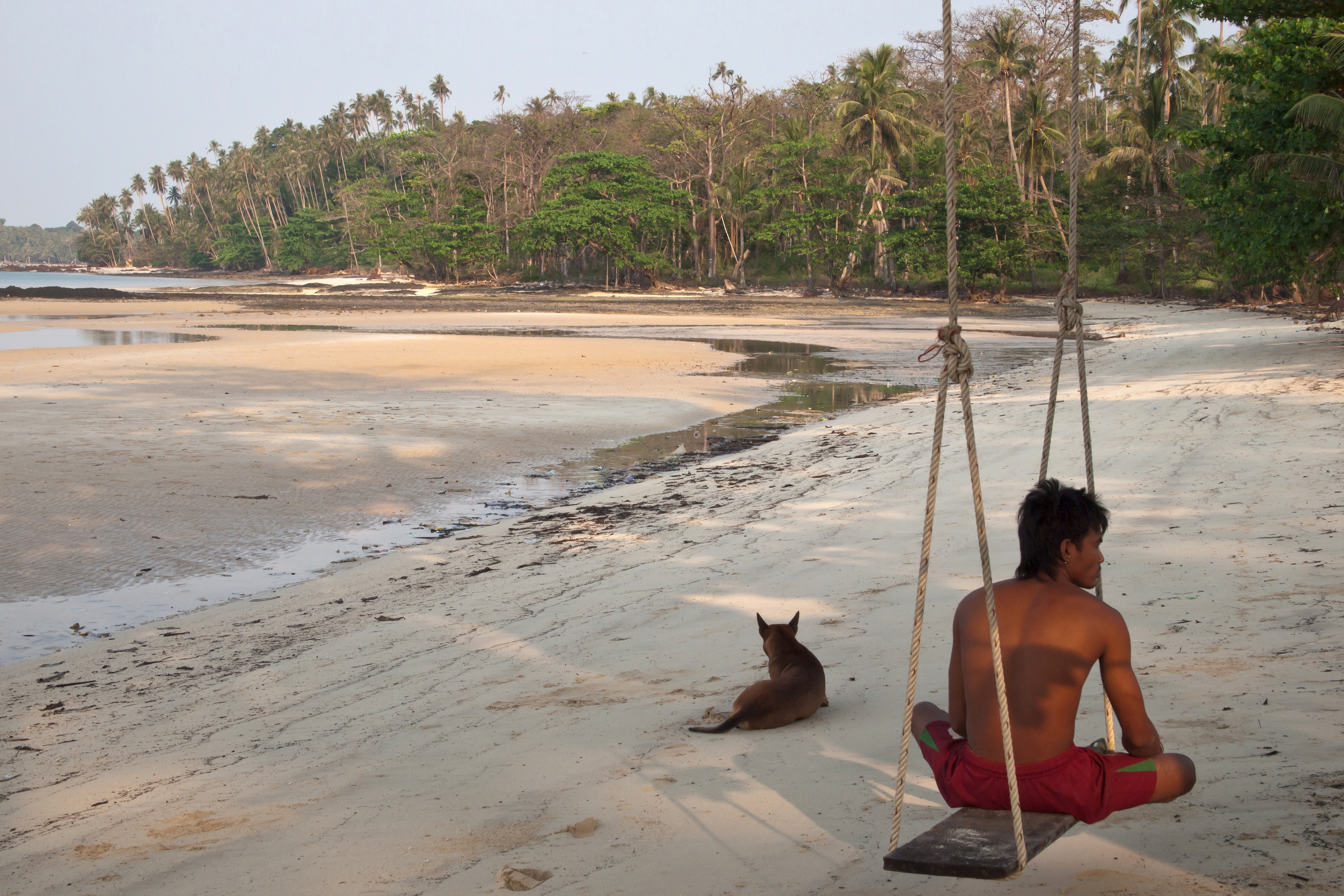
Western beach at low tide

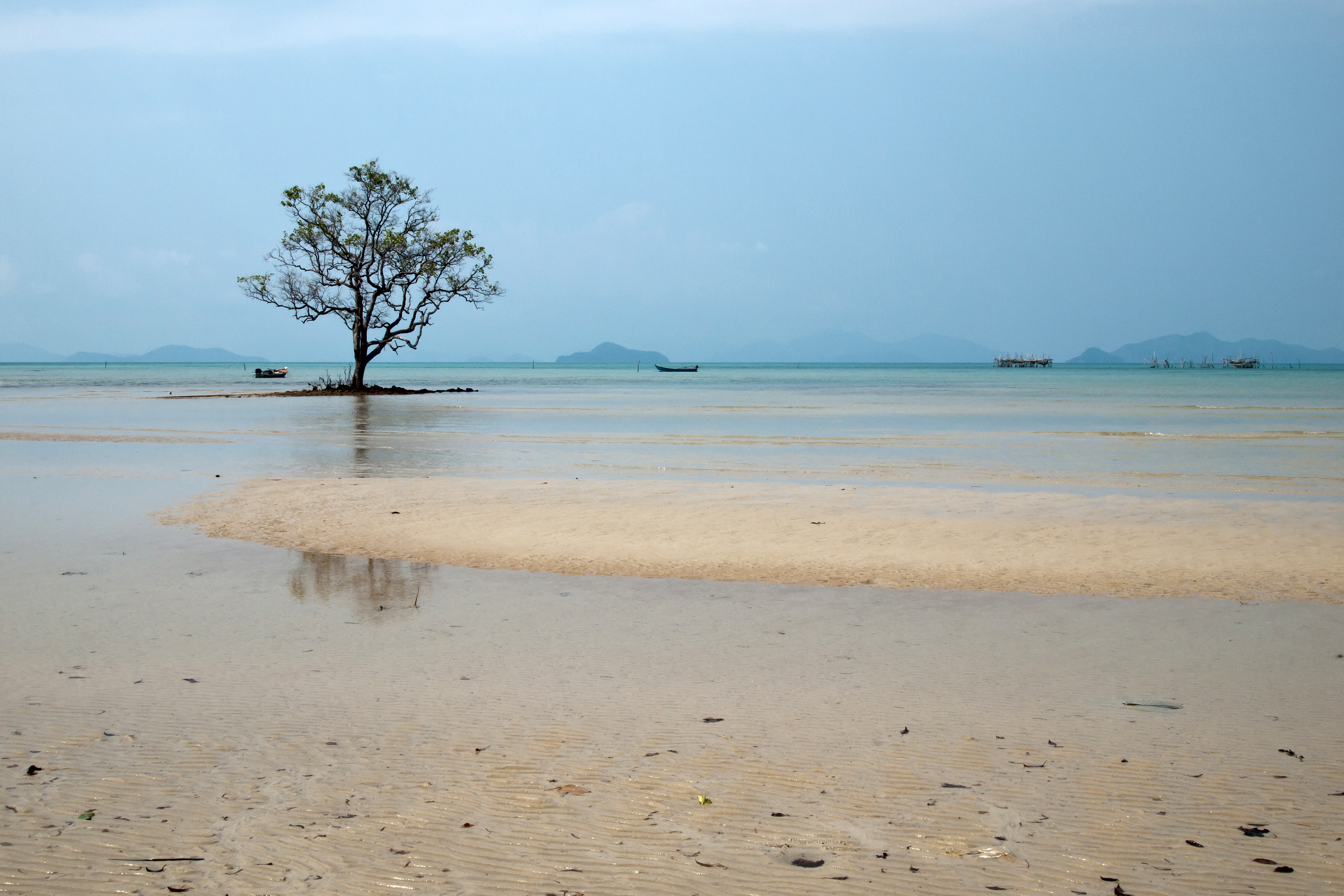
Shallow waters of the Gulf of Thailand, eastern lagoon

== See also ==
- List of islands of Thailand
