= Ko Phi =

Ko Phi is a small uninhabited island near Ko Mak, in Trat Province, Thailand.

It can be reached with a sea kayak from Ko Mak. Ko Phi has places to snorkel, depending on the direction of wind. It is located at the geographical coordinates 09°38′N 99°41′E.

== See also ==
- List of islands of Thailand
