= Ko Kut district =

Ko Kut เกาะกูด
- District
- District location in Trat province
- Coordinates: 11°39′30″N 102°32′32″E
- Country: Thailand
- Province: Trat
- Seat: Ko Kut

Area
  - Total: 162.2 km^{2} (62.6 sq mi)

Population (2011)
  - Total: 2,894
  - Density: 17.1/km^{2} (44/sq mi)
- Time zone: UTC+7 (ICT)
- Postal code: 23000
- Geocode: 2306

Ko Kut (Thai: เกาะกูด, pronounced [kɔ̀ʔ kùːt]) is a district (amphoe) of Trat province, eastern Thailand, consisting of a group of islands. With a population of 2,894 in 2011, it is the least populous of all of Thailand districts.

== History ==
Originally, the area of the district was part of the sub-district (tambon) Ko Chang, Laem Ngop district. In 1952, the sub-district Ko Mak was established to cover the whole island, at that time subdivided into four villages (mubans). In 1980, three villages of Ko Mak were split off to create the Ko Kut sub-district. On 1 April 1990, the government upgraded tambon Ko Kut together with tambon Ko Mak to a minor district (king amphoe).

The Thai government on 15 May 2007 upgraded all 81 minor districts to full districts. With publication in the Royal Gazette on 24 August, the upgrade became official.

As local government entities, the two tambon administrative organizations (TAO) were created in 2003 and 2004 respectively. The Tambon Council Ko Kut was upgraded to a TAO in 2003, and Ko Mak in 2004.

== Geography ==
The largest island in the district, Ko Kut, is a major island dotted with seaside villages and coconut plantations. It is about 60 minutes from the mainland by speedboat.

== Administration ==
The district is divided into two sub-districts (tambons), which are further subdivided into eight villages (mubans). There are two tambon administrative organizations (TAO), one for each sub-district.

No.	Name	Thai	Villages	Pop.
1.	Ko Mak	เกาะหมาก	2	403
2.	Ko Kut	เกาะกูด	6	1,715

== Gallery ==
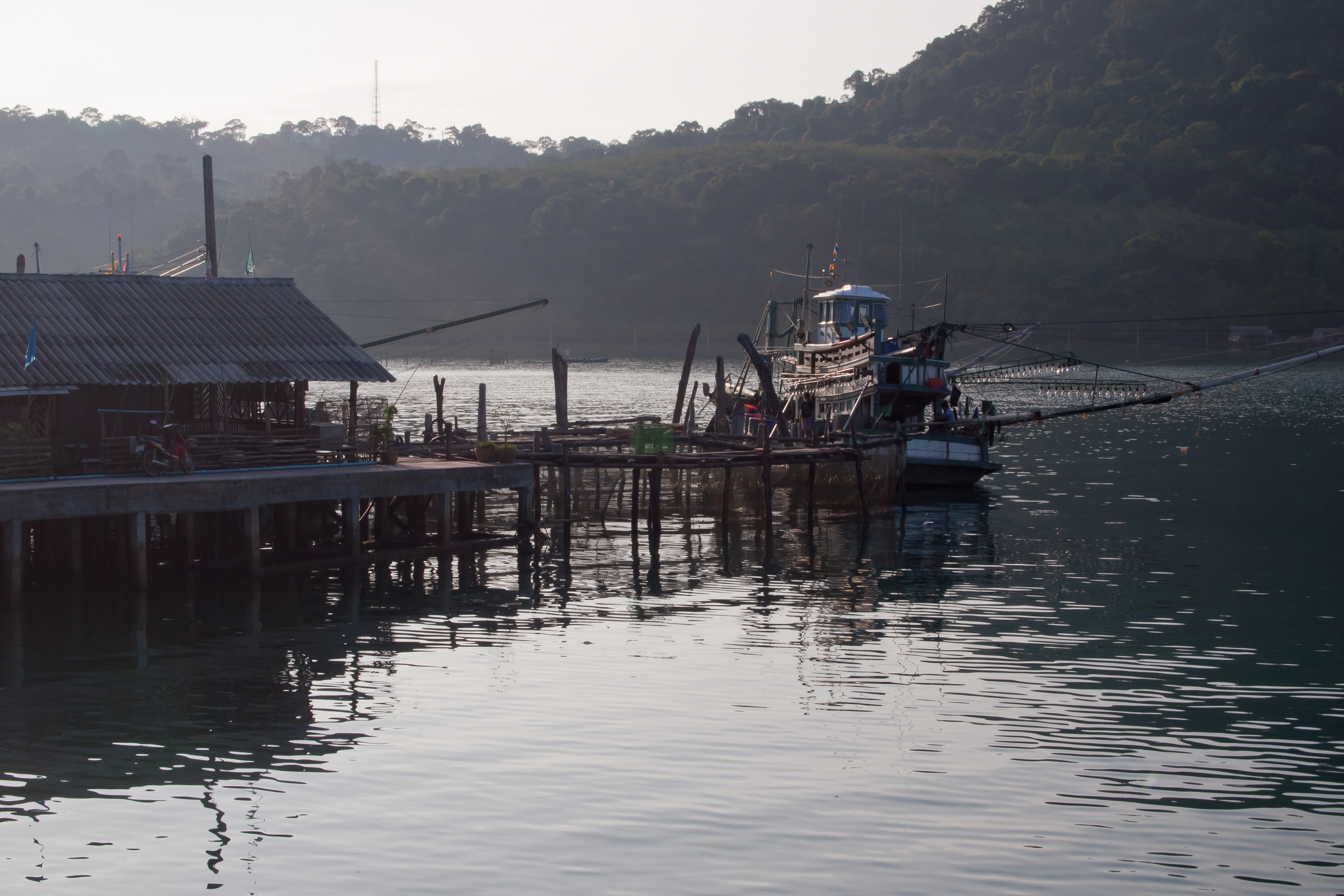
Ko Kut, Laem Ao Yai

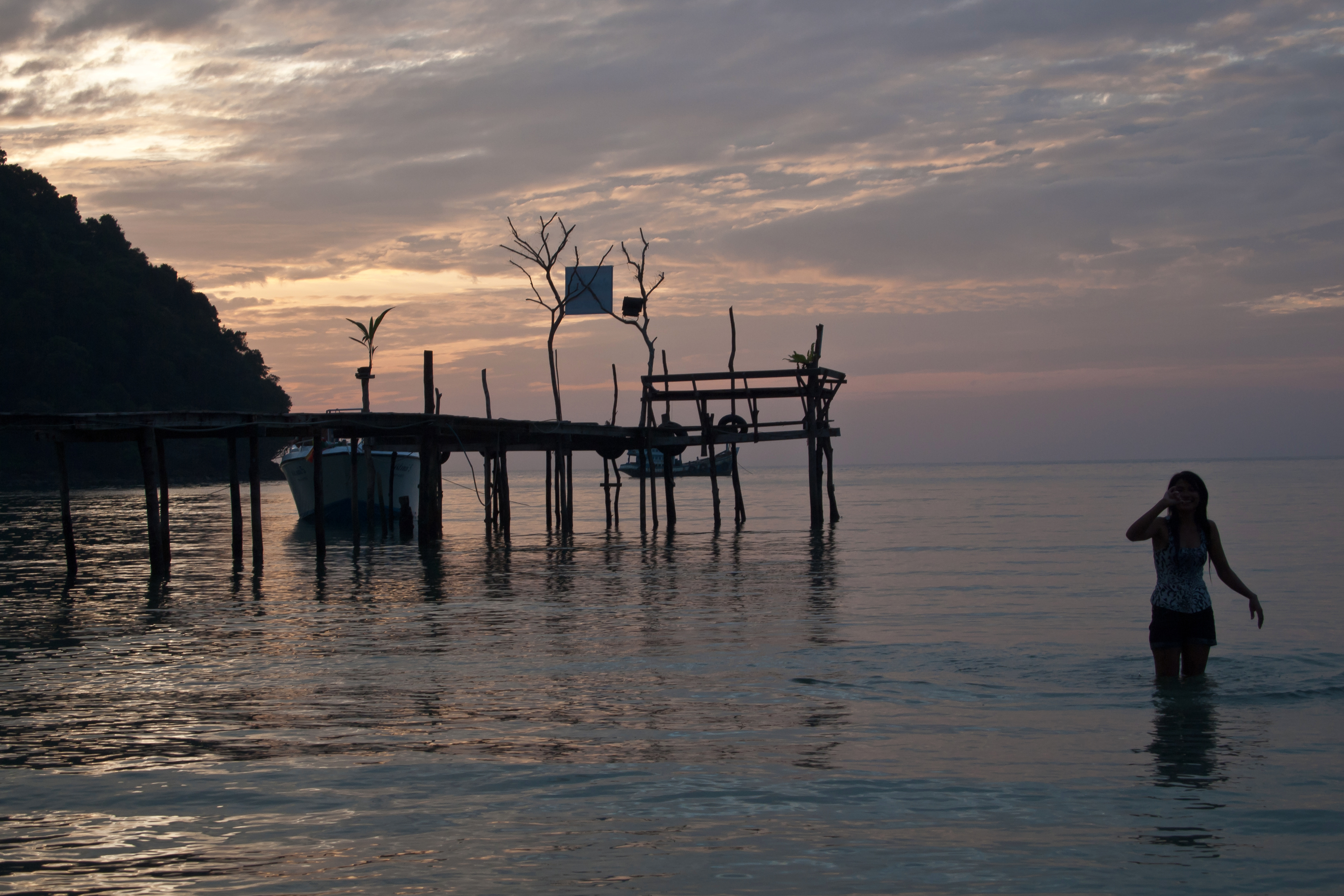
Ko Kut, Ao Bang Bao

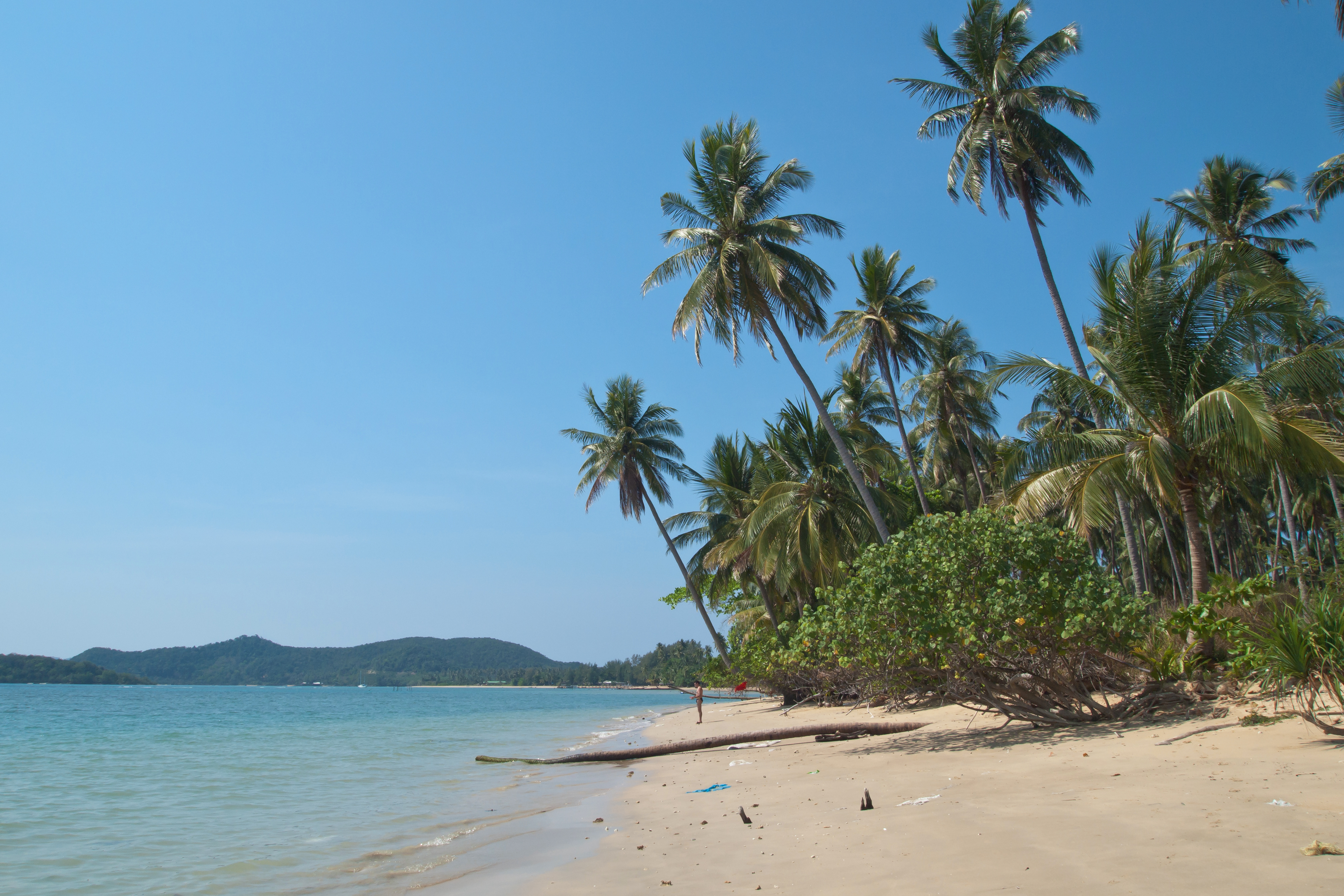
Ko Mak, Palm beach

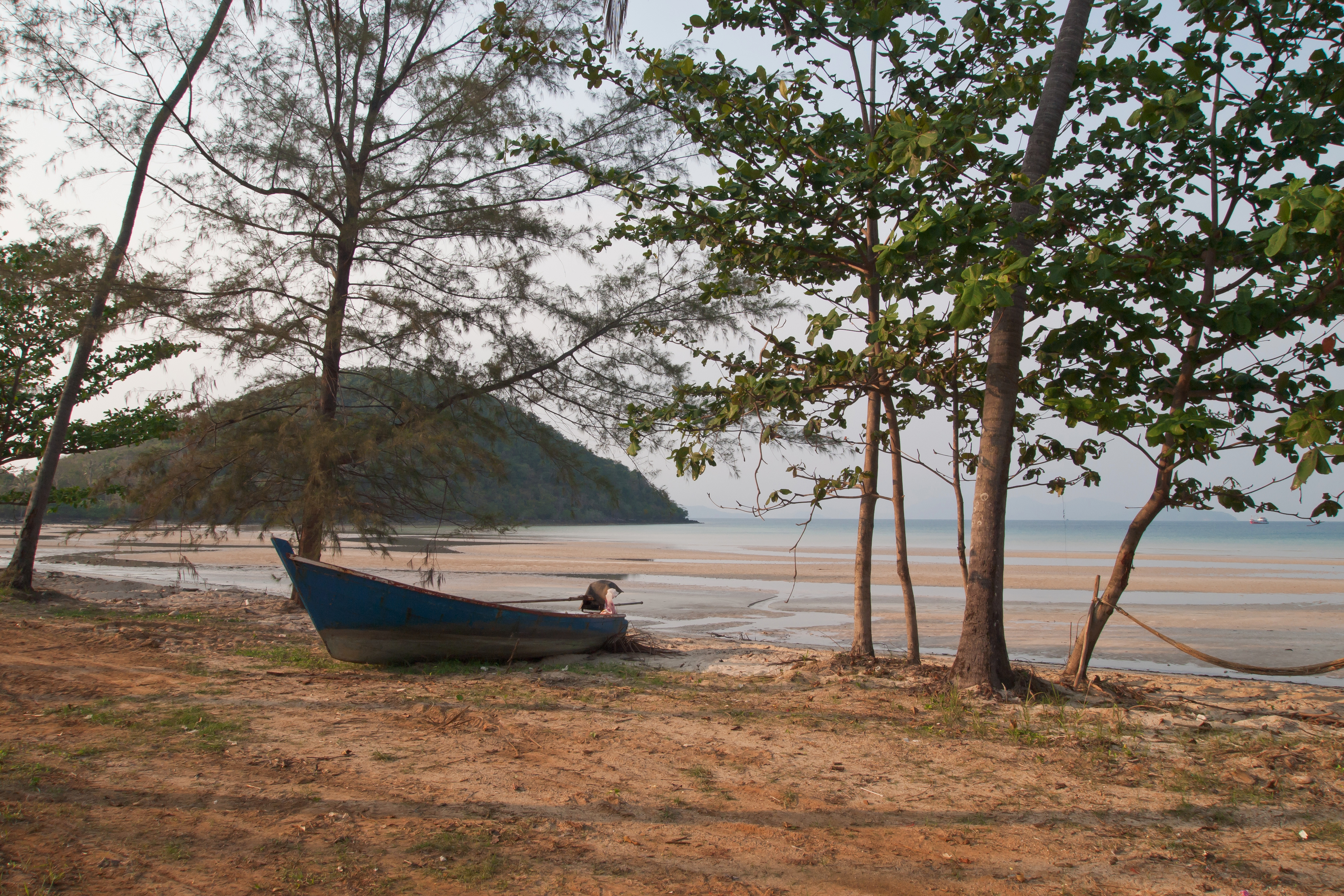
Ko Mak
