= Chang Island =

Chang Island may refer to:

- Koh or Ko Chang (เกาะช้าง, lit. "Elephant Island"), an island in Thailand
- Changsha (t 長沙, s 长沙, p Chángshā, lit."Long Island"), a former island in the Yangtze estuary now forming part of Chongming Island in Shanghai

== See also ==
- Changsha, the capital of China's Hunan province, with an identical Chinese name instead referring to its former long sandy beach
