= Ko Kham =

Island in Trat province, Thailand

Ko Kham (Thai: เกาะขาม, pronounced [kɔ̀ʔ kʰǎːm]) is a small island near Ko Mak, in Trat Province, eastern Thailand.

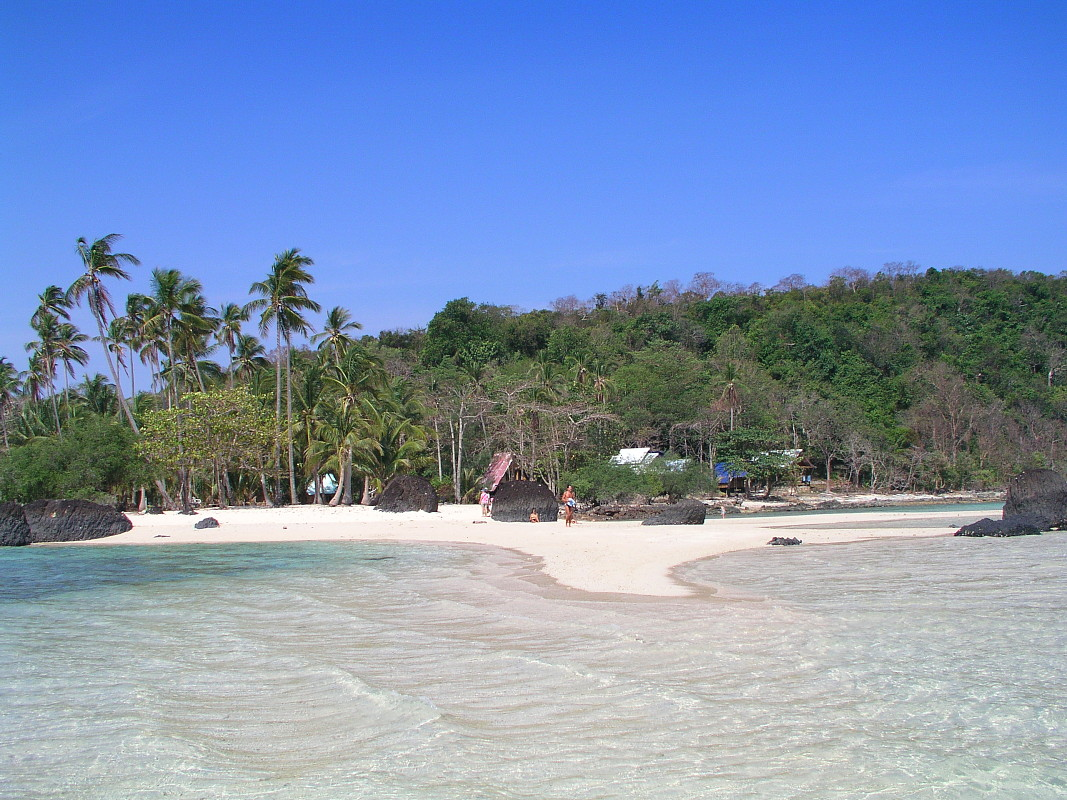

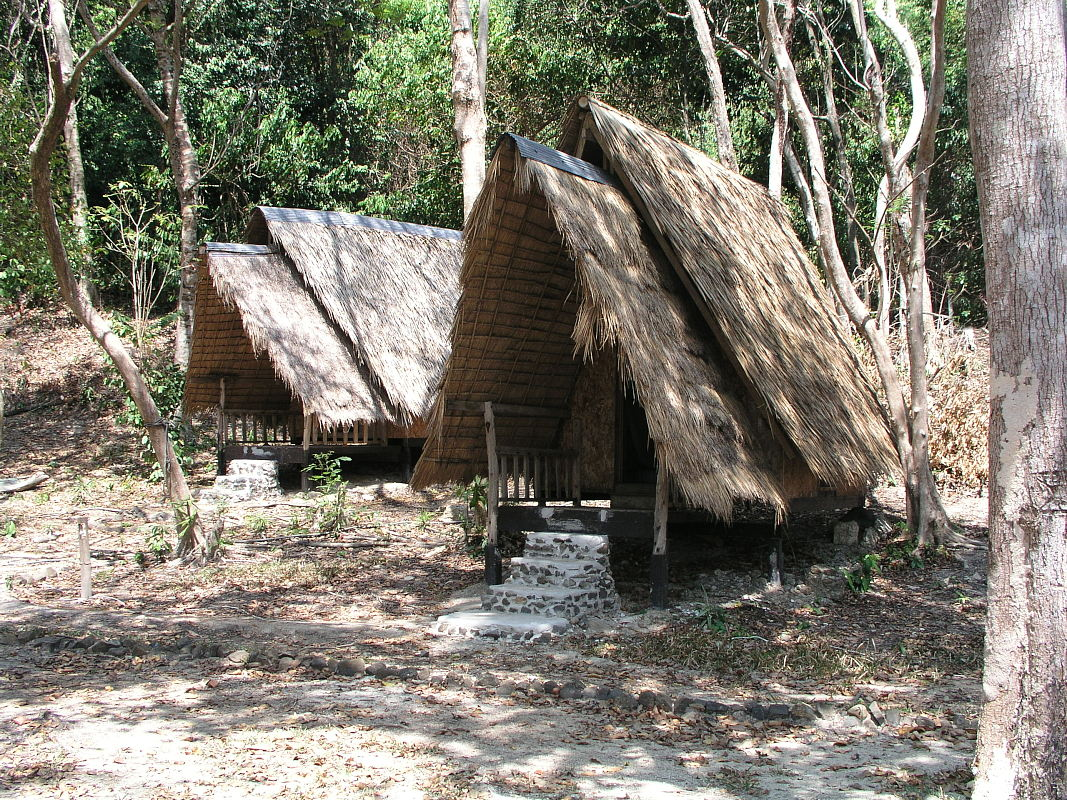
Bungalows on the island

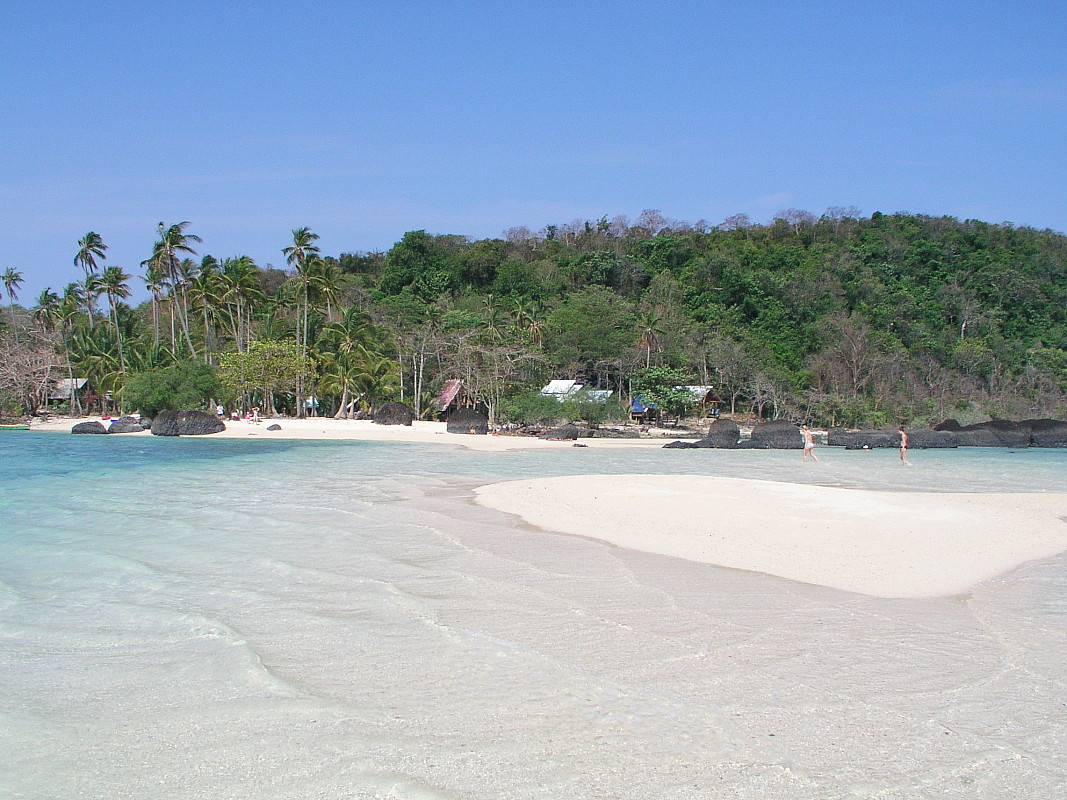

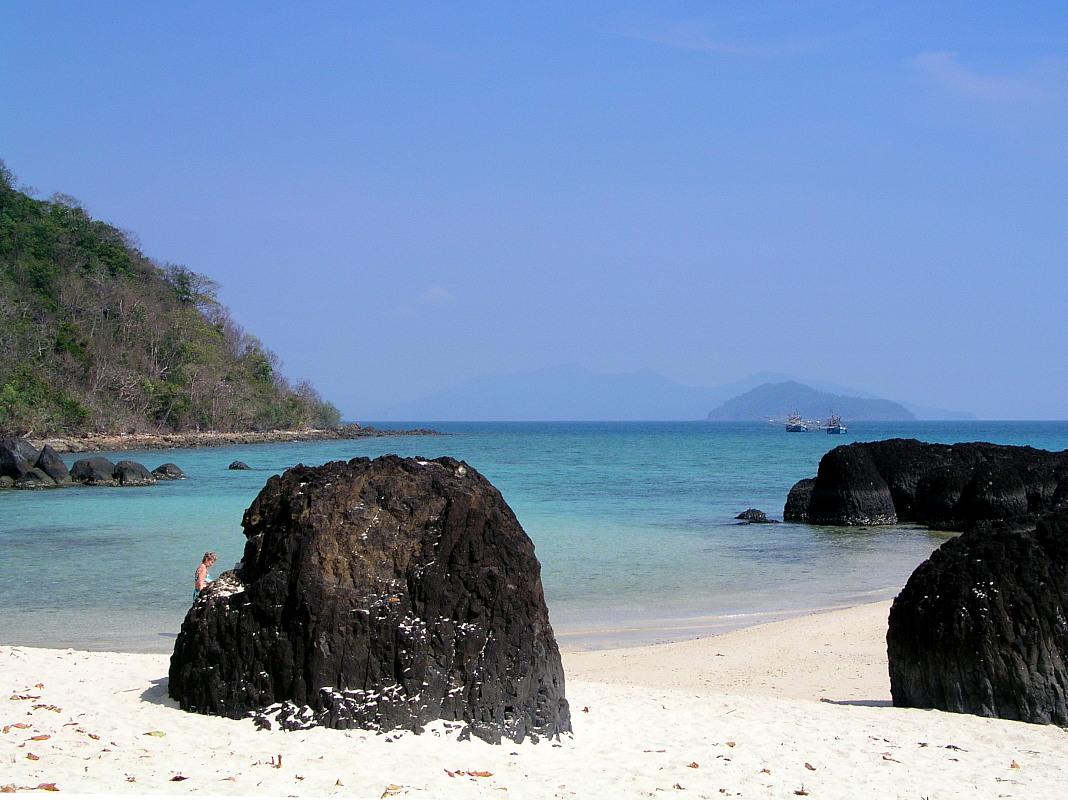

== See also ==
- List of islands of Thailand
