= Ko Kut =

Island in Thailand

Native name: เกาะกูด
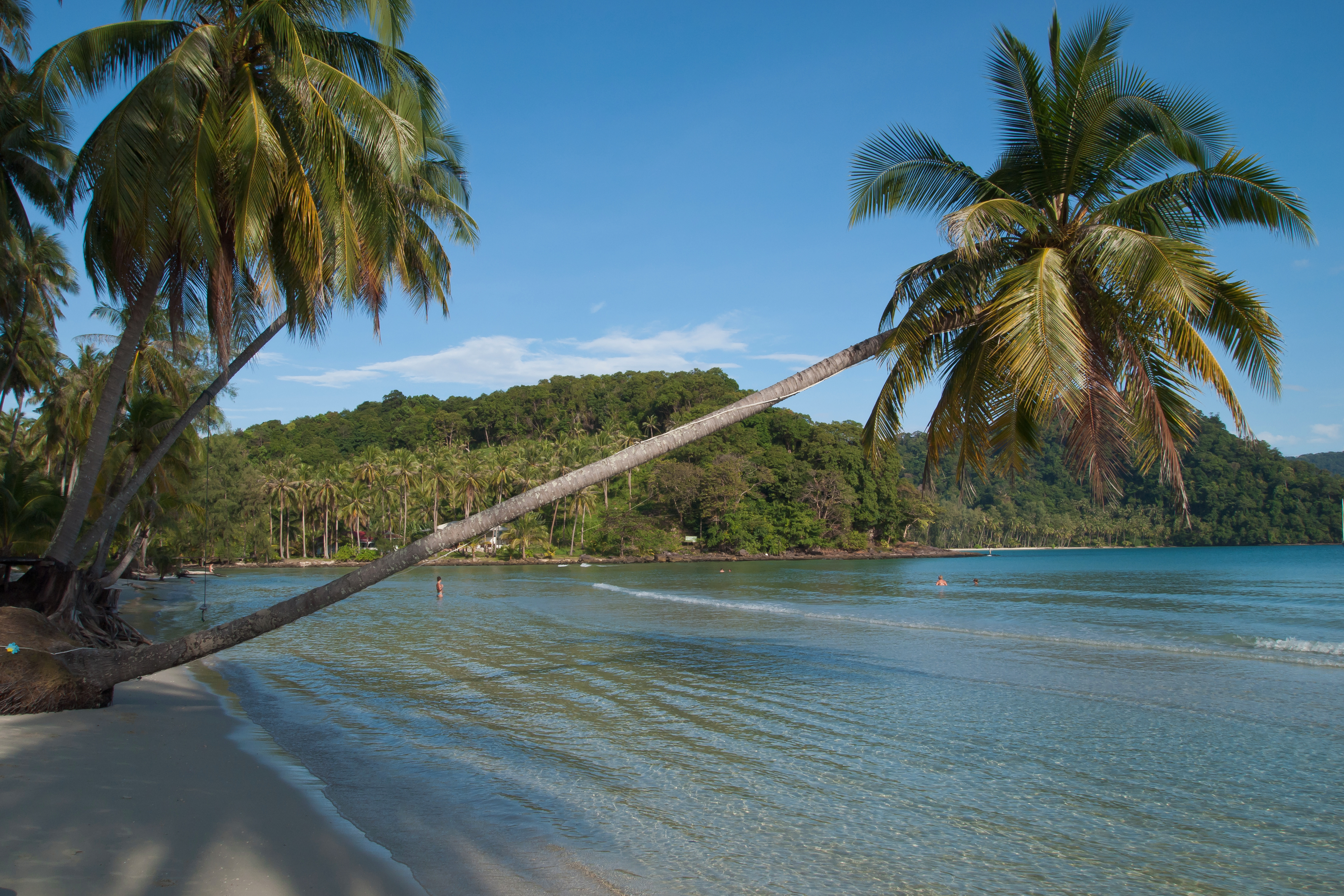
- Ko Kut, Bang Bao
- Interactive map of Ko Kut

Geography
- Coordinates: 11°39′N 102°32′E
- Adjacent to: Gulf of Thailand

Administration
- Thailand
- Province: Trat
- District: Ko Kut
- Tambon: Ko Kut

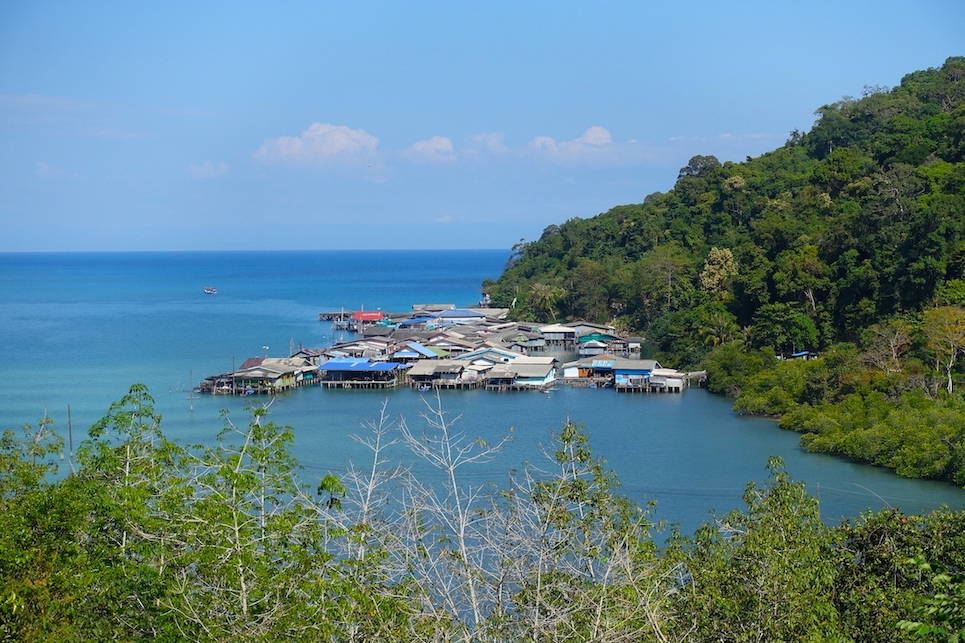
Ao Yai fishing village Koh Kood

Ko Kut (Thai: เกาะกูด, pronounced [kɔ̀ʔ kùːt]), also known as Koh Kood, is an island in the Gulf of Thailand. The island is administered as part of the Ko Kut District in Thailand's Trat Province.

== Description ==
Ko Kut is the largest of the dozen islands administered as part of the Ko Kut District. The economy of Ko Kut is centered around fishing, agriculture, and tourism. Some sources have described the island as being relatively remote and underdeveloped. The island's remoteness and lack of development make it a potential hub for ecotourism.

== History ==
The island and the entire Trat province emerged as a crucial trading hub during the Rattanakosin era (1782-1932) due to its strategic location on the route to Siam's capital city. As the Eastern traffic intensified, pirates began to gather in this region and its neighboring islands.

Following the decline of the piracy era, the island's inhabitants primarily relied on cultivating rubber, fruits, and coconut trees until the development of a local tourism industry in the 1990s.

== Dispute ==
Ko Kut was disputed between Thailand and Cambodia in the mid-1960s.

Under the 1907 Siamese-French Border Treaty, a continuation of an earlier agreement between Siam and France, which controlled Cambodia at the time. In this agreement, France ceded some of its previously claimed territory around Ko Kut to Siam, including several small islands in the Sea of Siam. After Cambodia's independence in 1954, despite Cambodia's claims to several sea areas and islets around the border, the 1907 Treaty was still recognized as the legal basis for the recognition of Ko Kut as part of Thailand. Therefore, despite Cambodia's claims, Thailand retained control over Ko Kut under this international treaty, which designated the island as part of Siam (now Thailand).
