= Ko Chang district =

Ko Chang เกาะช้าง
- District
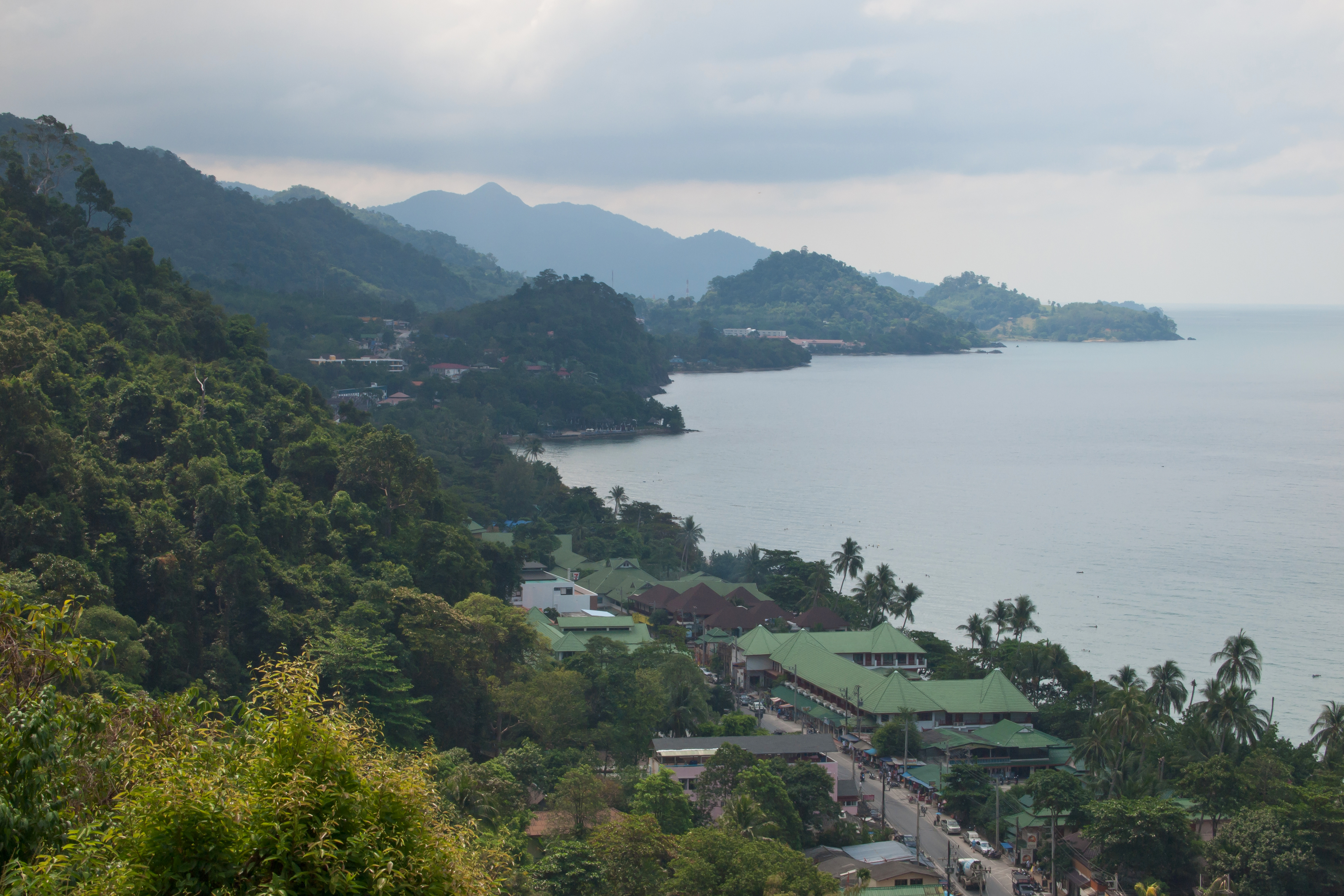
- West coast of Ko Chang

- District location in Trat province
- Coordinates: 12°6′13″N 102°21′7″E
- Country: Thailand
- Province: Trat
- Seat: Ko Chang

Area
  - Total: 217 km^{2} (84 sq mi)

Population (2019)
  - Total: 8,538
  - Density: 39.34/km^{2} (101.9/sq mi)
- Time zone: UTC+7 (ICT)
- Postal code: 23170
- Geocode: 2307

Ko Chang (Thai: เกาะช้าง, pronounced [kɔ̀ʔ t͡ɕʰáːŋ]) is an amphoe (district) in Trat province, Thailand. It is on the Gulf of Thailand's eastern coast, 300 km (190 mi) from Bangkok, near the border with Cambodia.

The island Ko Chang occupies most of the district's land area, along with several smaller islands. With an area of 210 km^{2} (81 sq mi), Ko Chang is the third-largest island in Thailand by area, after Phuket and Ko Samui. The name Ko Chang means 'Elephant Island' and derives from its elephant-shaped headland. Despite the presence of elephants on the island, they are not indigenous. At present, there are eight villages on the island.

== History ==
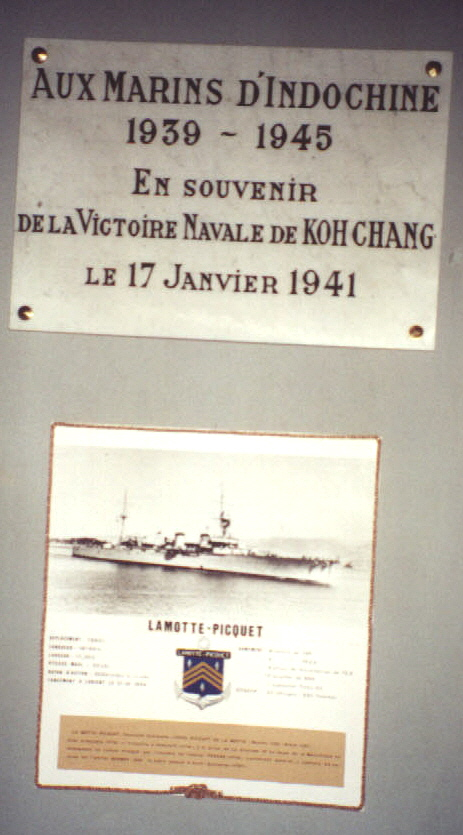
Plaque commemorating the Ko Chang battle

Prior to World War II, Ko Chang was little known. During this period, the few families there made a living growing coconuts and fruits.

On 17 January 1941, Ko Chang was the scene of the Battle of Ko Chang between the Royal Thai Navy and a much stronger Vichy French naval squadron, in which the French won a decisive victory. Ko Chang Yutthanawi Day, which occurs in late-January at the Ko Chang Yutthanawi Memorial on Laem Ngop, commemorates the Royal Thai Navy's engagement against the French colonialists. There is an exhibition by the Royal Thai Navy, and merit-making and tribute rites are performed for those killed in the battle.

== Geography ==
Ko Chang is part of an archipelago of 52 islands. It is approximately 30 km (19 mi) long by 14 km (8.7 mi) wide. It is part of the Mu Ko Chang National Park, which covers an area of 650 km^{2} (250 sq mi), of which 70 percent is offshore.

It is a mountainous island, with Khao Salak Phet being the highest peak at 744 m (2,441 ft). The island is known for several waterfalls, coral reefs, and rainforests.

The main settlements on the west coast are around Sai Khao, Hat Kai Mook, Hat Kai Bae, Ban Klong Prao and the fishing village of Bang Bao on the south coast. The island's administrative centre is Ban Dan Mai on the east coast.

== Climate ==
Most of Thailand receives between 1,200 mm (47 in) and 1,600 mm (63 in) of precipitation per year. Two provinces, Trat and Ranong, receive more than 4,500 mm (180 in) a year, making them the wettest places in the country.

== Wildlife ==
Ko Chang is home to populations of 29 species of mammals, for example, the stump-tailed macaque, the small Indian civet, the small Asian mongoose, 61 bird species, and a number of snakes and deer.

The Ko Chang frog (Limnonectes kohchangae) was originally thought to be an endemic species, but has also been found on the mainland.

== Administration ==
The island forms a district (amphoe) in the province of Trat. It was formed on 30 April 1994, when it was split off from Laem Ngop district, at first being classed as a minor district (king amphoe). On 15 May 2007, the nation's 81 minor districts were upgraded to full districts. With publication in the Royal Gazette on 24 August, the upgrade became official.

Ko Chang district is divided into two sub-districts (tambons) which are home to nine villages (mubans):

1. Ko Chang (Thai: เกาะช้าง), consisting of four villages with 3,010 inhabitants:

- Ban Khlong Nonsi
- Ban Dan Mai
- Ban Khlong Son
- Ban Khlong Phrao

2. Ko Chang Tai (Thai: เกาะช้างใต้), consisting of five villages with 2,346 inhabitants:

- Bang Bao
- Ban Salak Phet
- Ban Chek Bae
- Ban Salak Khok
- Ban Salak Phet Nuea

== Transport ==
=== Air ===
Ko Chang has no airport. The nearest airport is Trat Airport 17 km (11 mi) from the Ao Thammachat Ko Chang ferry terminal on the mainland.

=== Road ===
There are two main roads on Ko Chang, running the length of the east and west coasts. Both roads start at Ao Sapparot in the north, near the ferry piers. Shorter roads branch out to Ploytalay Resort and Keereephet, Khlong Nueng, and Klong Phu waterfalls.

The nearest long-distance road transport is at Trat town, from where the 300 km (190 mi) journey to Bangkok takes five hours by bus.

=== Boat ===
There are two ferry companies that run services from the mainland to Ko Chang. Both take vehicles and passengers. During high season, from November to May, there are passenger-only boat services from Ko Chang to the outlying islands of Ko Wai, Ko Mak, and Ko Kut. Boats do not run to outlying islands all year. They stop August / September times due to big seas and low season.

== Economy ==
Ko Chang's income derives largely from tourism, but some traditional livelihoods still exist. Many of Ko Chang's villages rely on fishing, with Ban Salak Phet (Thai: บ้านสลักเพชร) being the largest and oldest community on Ko Chang, in a sheltered location in the south of the island. Other fishing villages include Bang Bao (Thai: หมู่บ้านประมงบางเบ้า), at Bang Bao Beach, which consists of houses on stilts built into the sea, and Ban Khlong Son, which also partly relies on rubber plantations. Ban Dan Mai and Ban Khlong Non Si also have coconut plantations, and orchards of lychee trees. The variety of lychee grown, Silaman 200 years, is believed to be found only on Ko Chang.

The first foreign backpackers started arriving on Ko Chang in the mid-1970s, using local fishing boats, when the island was still undeveloped. In 2019 tourism is the island's biggest earner. In 1982, Ko Chang along with the surrounding area became part of the protected Mu Ko Chang National Park, with approximately 85 percent of the island, together with nearby coral reefs, falling within the park.

In 2020, an American tourist was arrested for posting negative feedback about his experience at a hotel in Ko Chang. While the tourist was released from prison after apologizing, TripAdvisor, for the first time ever, placed a warning to prospective customers on the hotel's TripAdvisor page, regarding the incident.

== Gallery ==
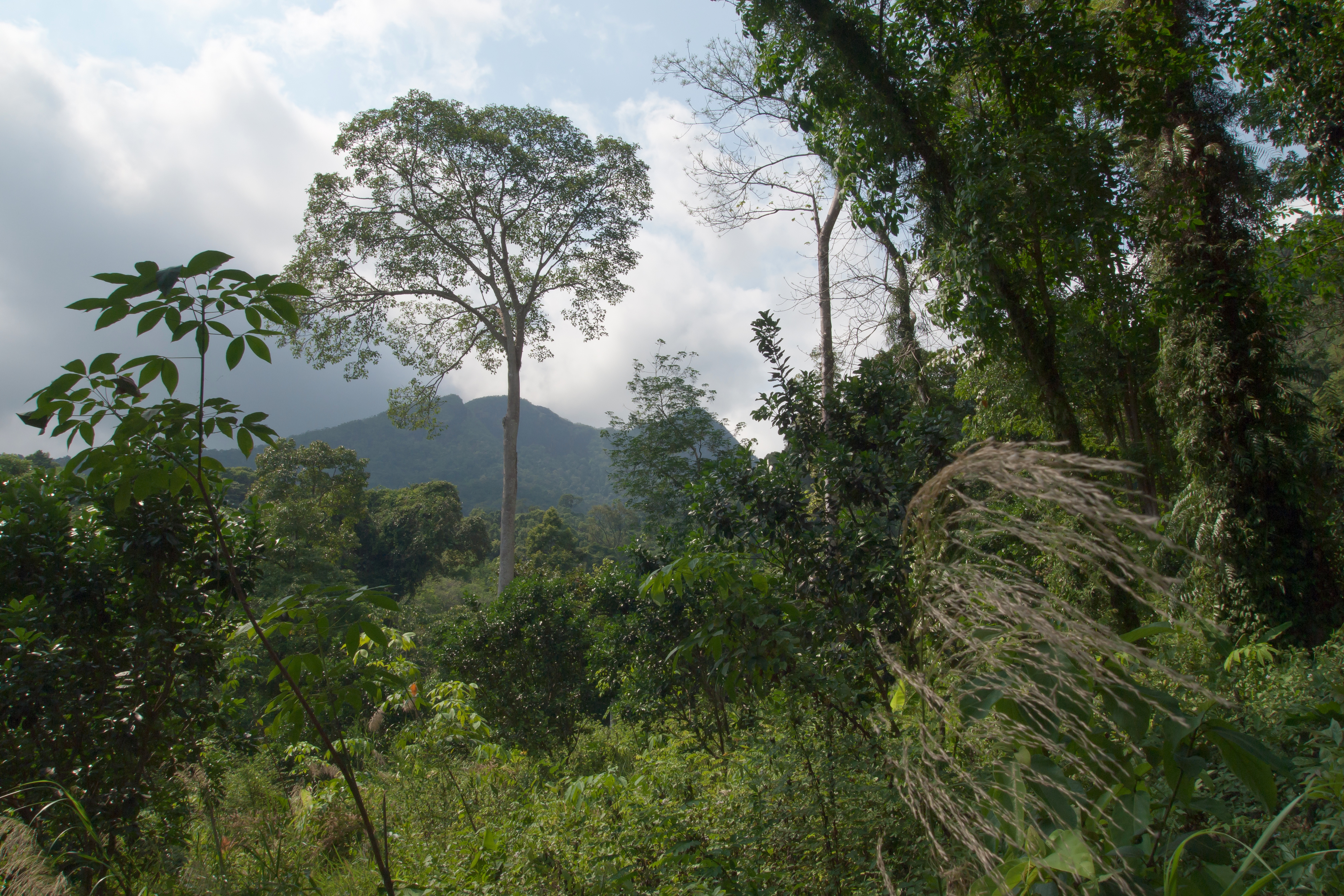
Tropical rainforest in the interior

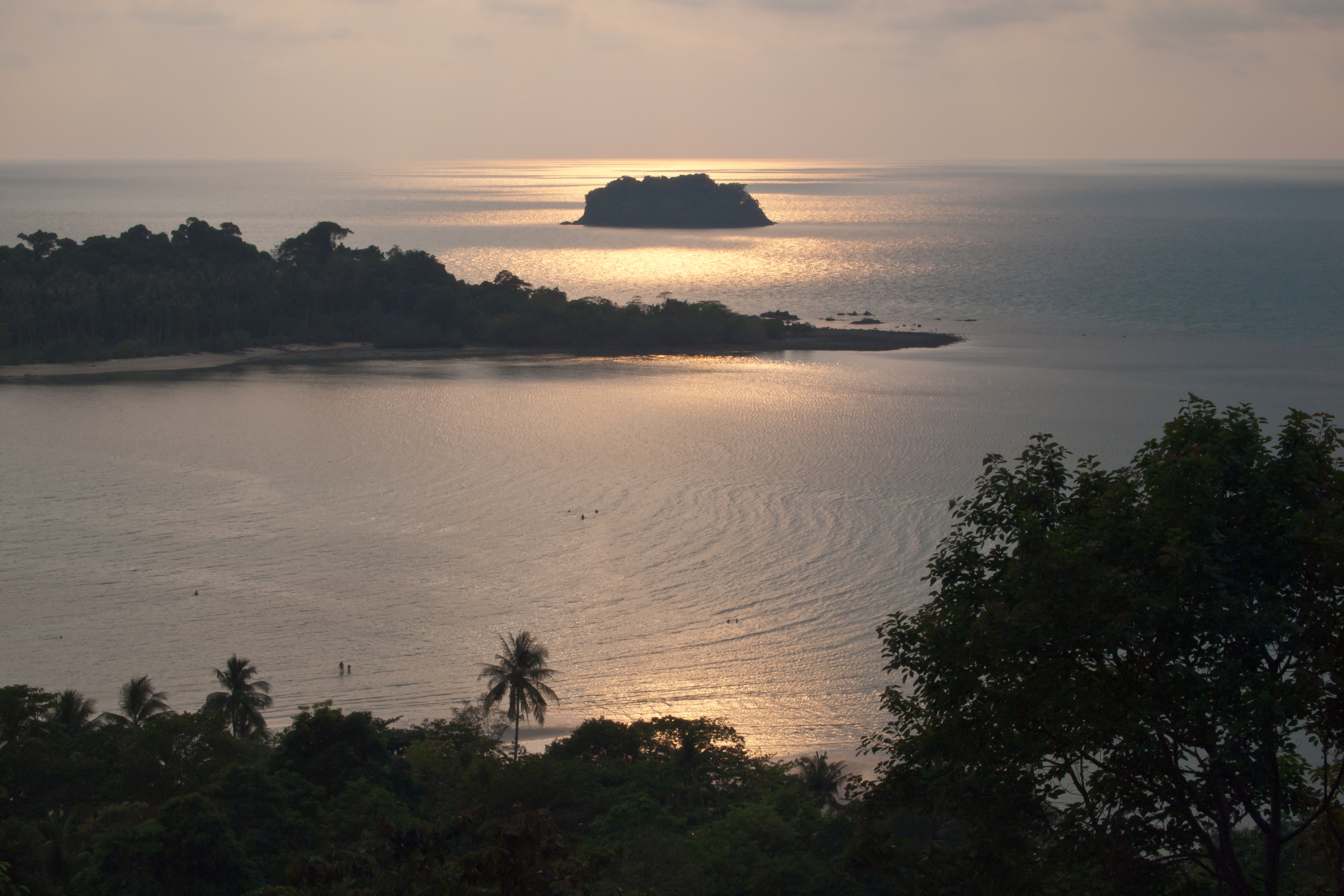
Sunset on the west side

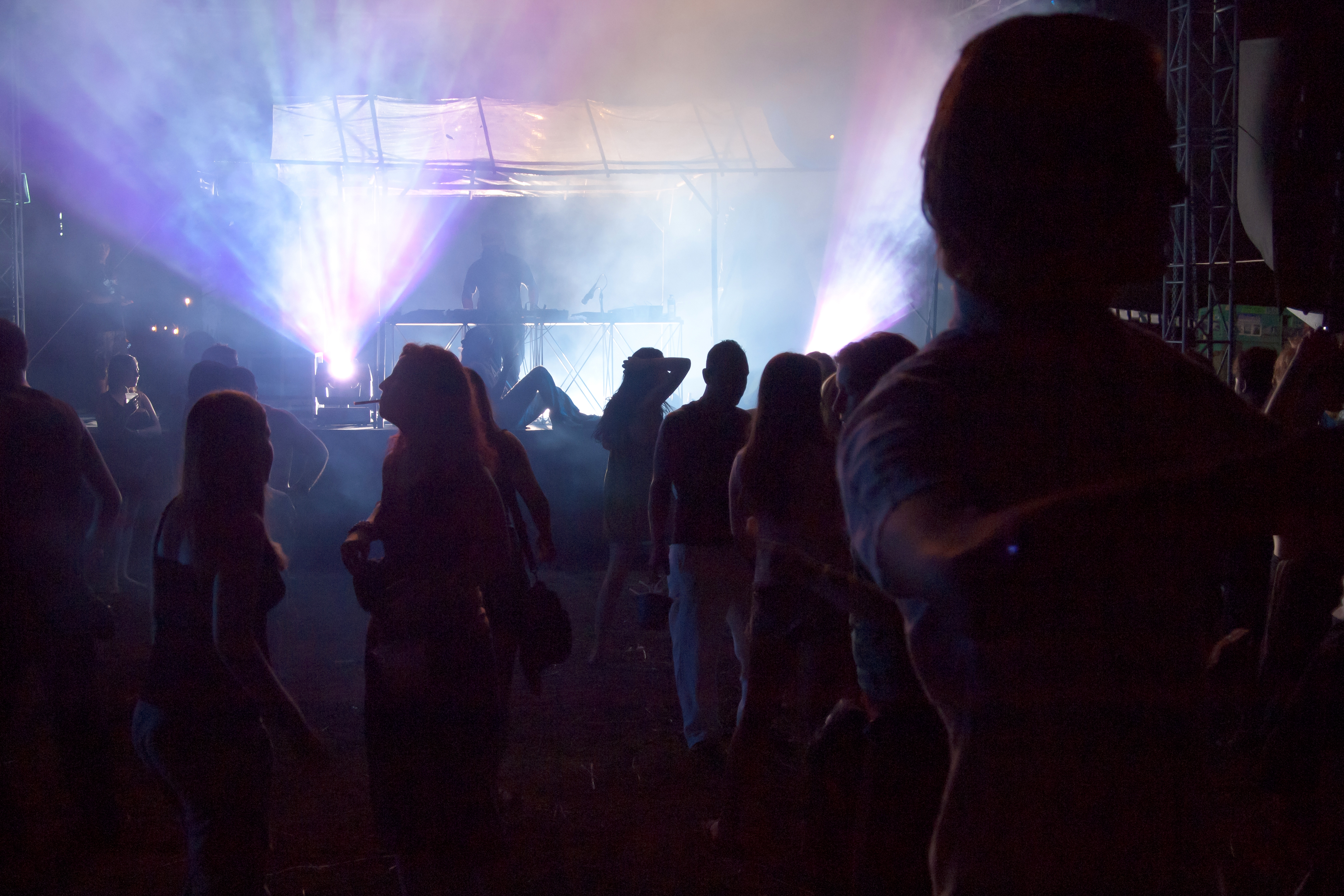
Parties in the Lonely Beach

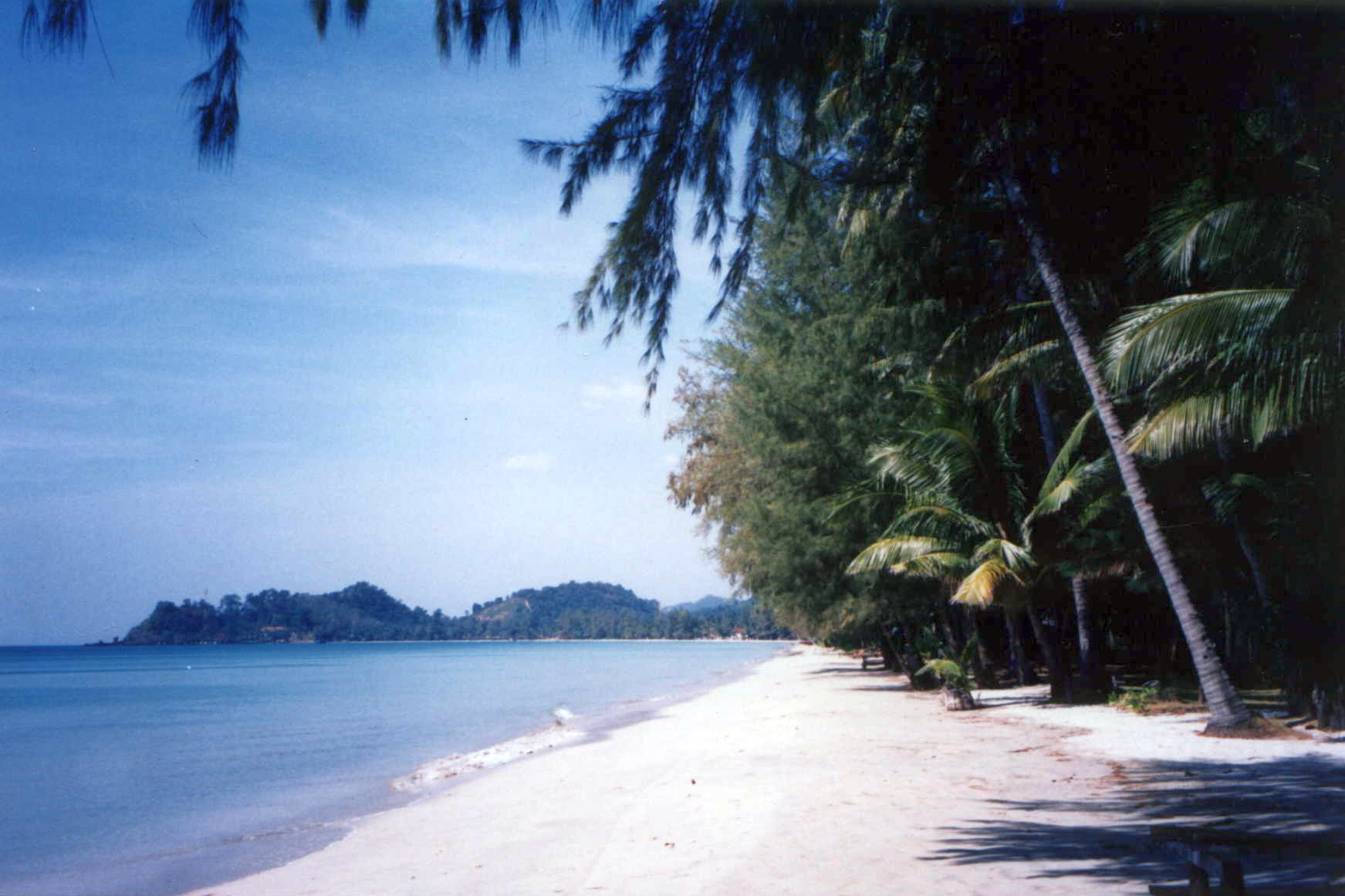
Hat Khlong Phrao Beach

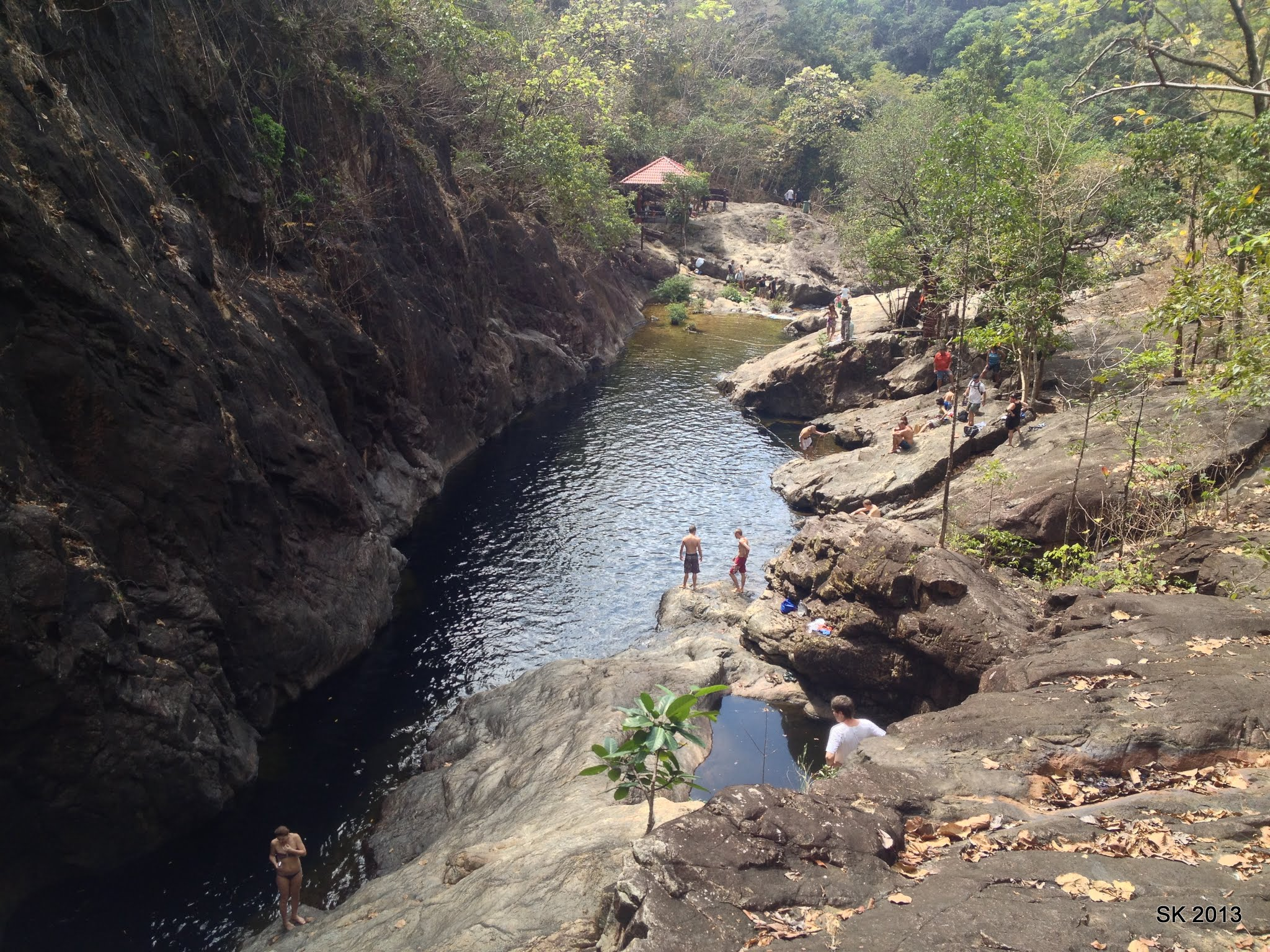
Khlong Phlu Waterfall

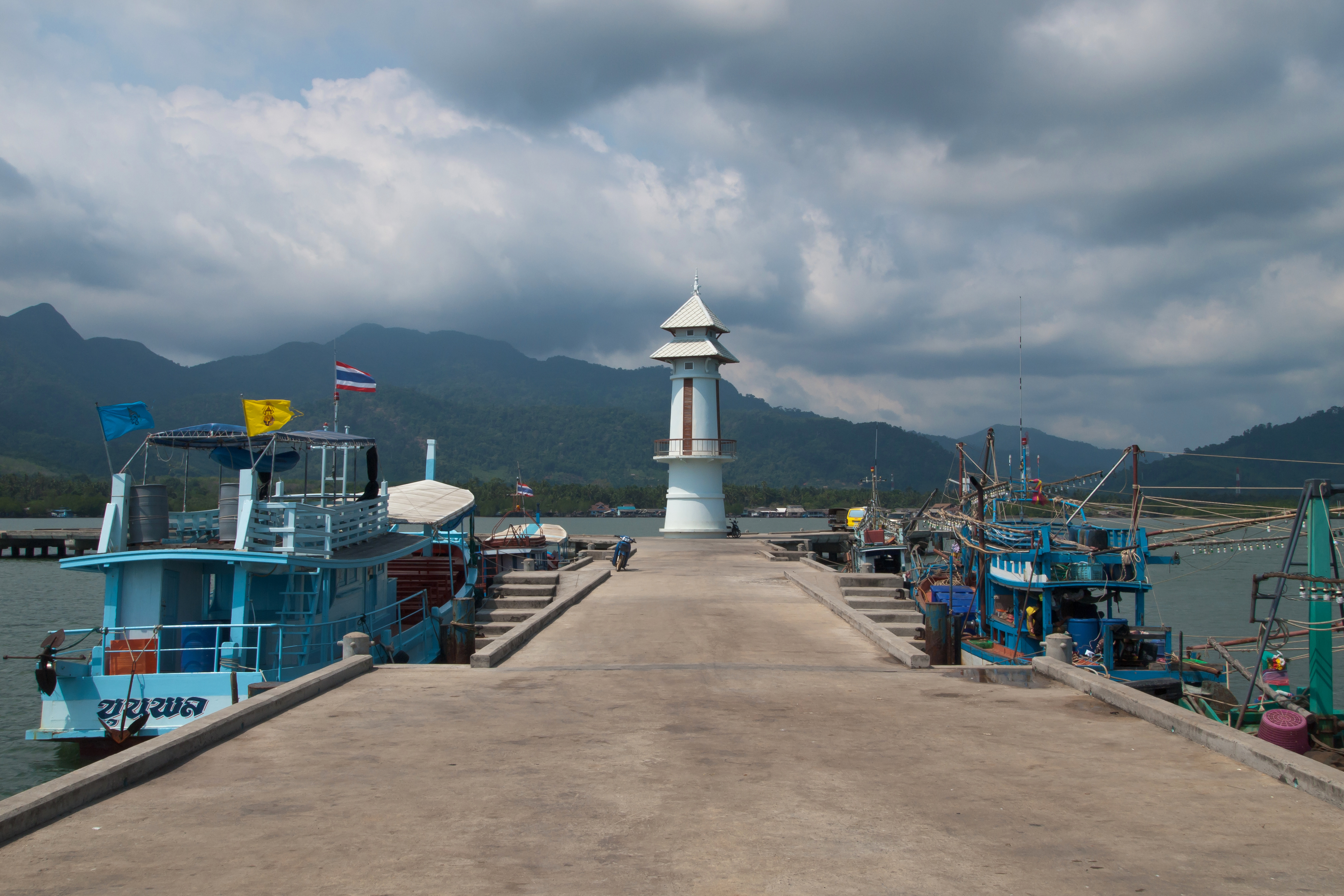
Baan Salak Petch Pier

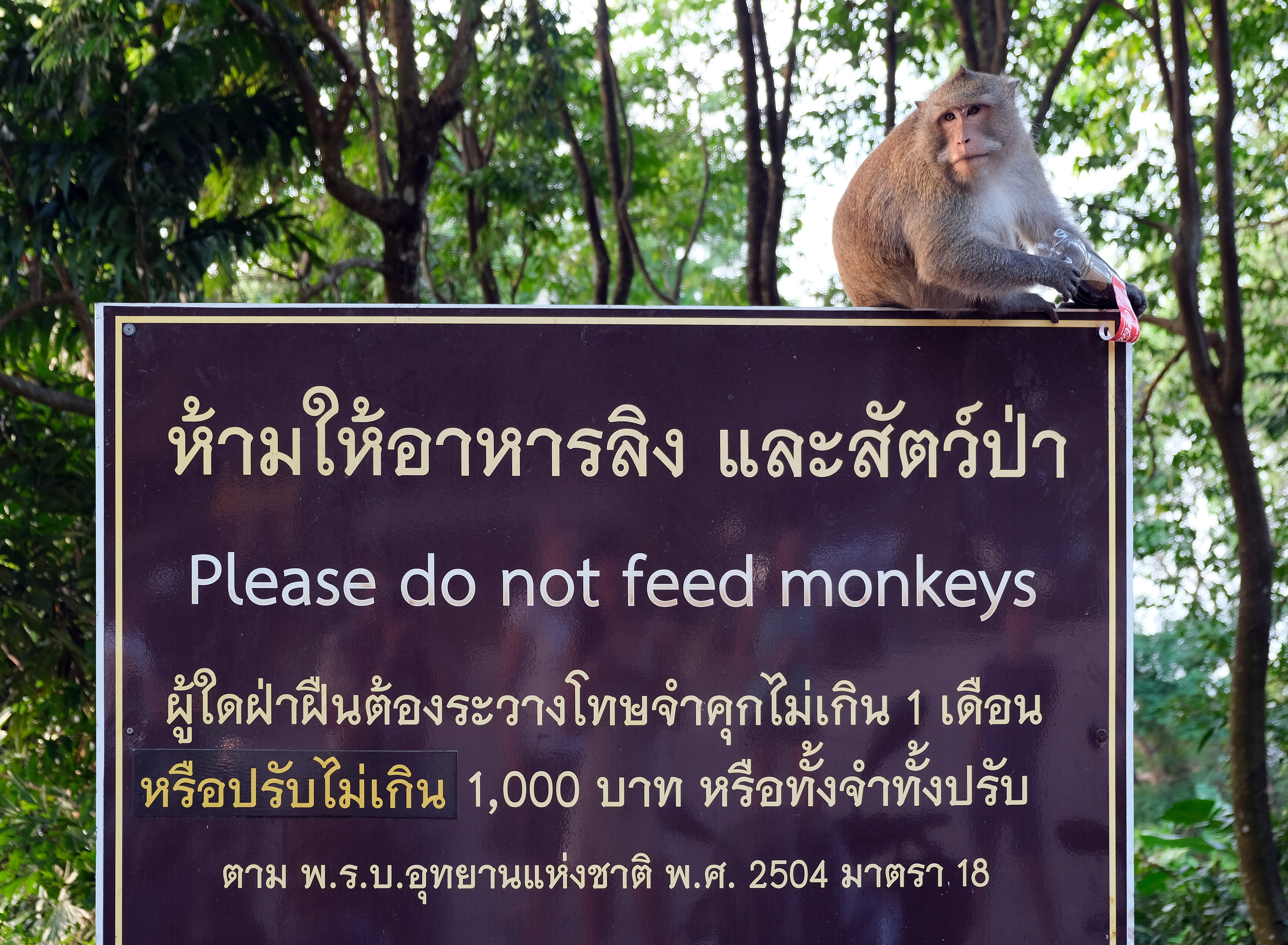
Crab-eating macaque perched on a "Please do not feed monkeys" sign near Hat Kai Bae

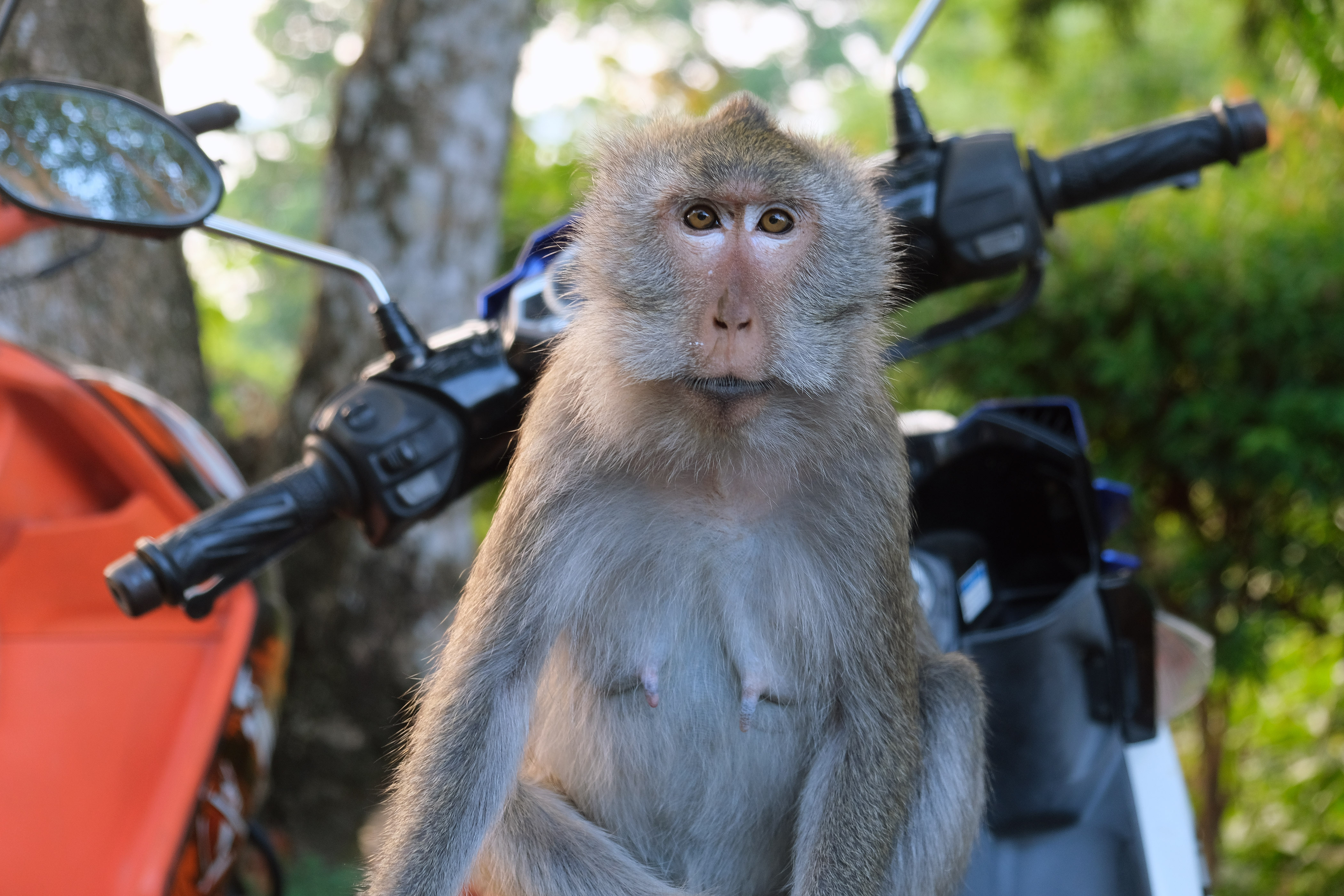
Crab-eating macaque on a motorcycle at the viewpoint near Hat Kai Bae
