= Trat province =

Trat ตราด
- Province
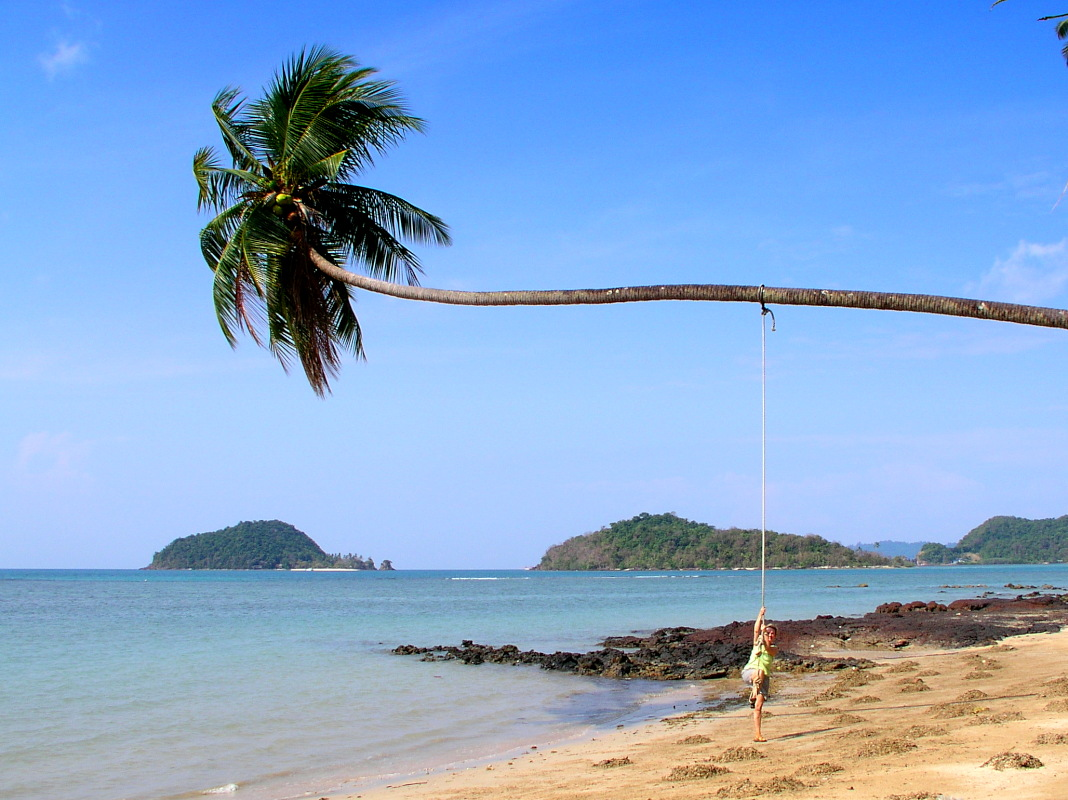
- Ko Mak

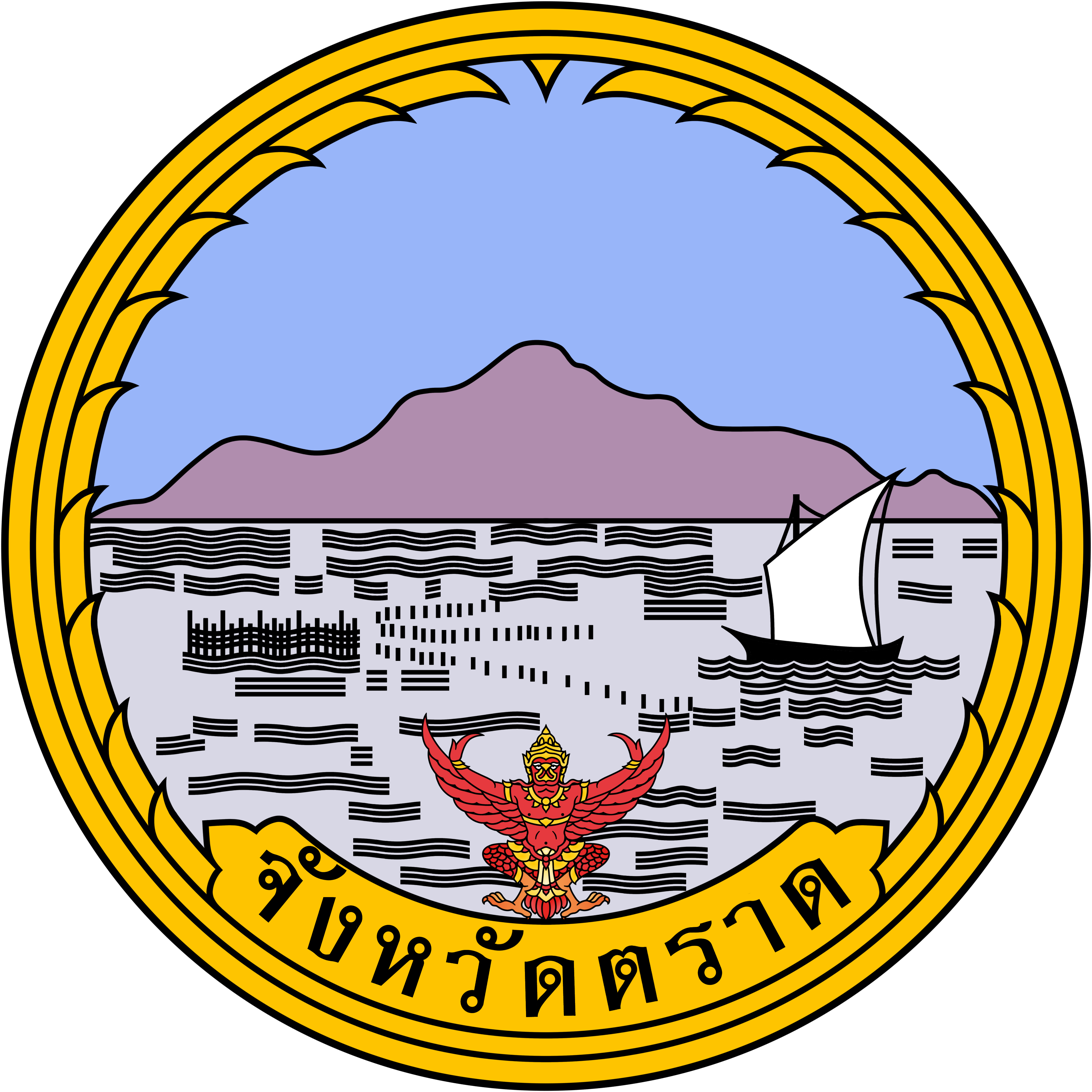
- Flag Seal
- Motto: เมืองเกาะครึ่งร้อย พลอยแดงค่าล้ำ ระกำแสนหวาน หลังอานหมาดี ยุทธนาวีเกาะช้าง สุดทางบูรพา ("The city of half a hundred islands. Precious rubies. Sweet salacca. Fine Thai ridgeback dogs. The Naval Battle of Ko Chang. The far end in the East."
- Map of Thailand highlighting Trat province
- Coordinates: 12°24′N 102°31′Ecenter of province
- Country: Thailand
- Capital: Trat

Government
  - Governor: Piriya Chantadilok (since 2025)

Area
  - Total: 2,866 km^{2} (1,107 sq mi)
  - Rank: 63rd

Population (2024)
  - Total: ▲226,517
  - Rank: 74th
  - Density: 79/km^{2} (200/sq mi)
  - Rank: 63rd

Human Achievement Index
  - HAI (2022): 0.6457 "average" Ranked 31st

GDP
  - Total: baht 47 billion (US$1.4 billion) (2019)
- Time zone: UTC+7 (ICT)
- Postal code: 23xxx
- Calling code: 039
- ISO 3166 code: TH-23
- Website: trat.go.th

Trat Provincial Administrative Organization องค์การบริหารส่วนจังหวัดตราด
- Provincial Administrative Organization
- Interactive map of Trat Provincial Administrative Organization

Government
  - Type: Local administrative divisions
  - Body: Trat Provincial Administrative Organization
  - President: Wichian Sapcharoen
- Website: trat-pao.go.th

Trat province (Thai: ตราด, pronounced [tràːt]), also spelt Trad province, is one of Thailand's seventy-six provinces (changwat), and is located in the region of eastern Thailand. It borders Chanthaburi province to the northwest, and Cambodia's provinces of Pailin, Battamabang, Pursat, and Koh Kong to its north, northeast and east. To the south, it borders the Gulf of Thailand and the Pacific Ocean. It is the 15th smallest province of Thailand at 2,819 km^{2} (1,088 sq mi), and its 4th least populated province at 229,958 (2019). Its capital is Trat town.

During the Ayutthaya kingdom, Trat became an important location for trade. During the 1893 Paknam crisis, French soldiers occupied the province, with Siam handing over Trat to French colonial rule in return for Chanthaburi province. However, Trat was returned to Siam in 1907 in return for Siamese land along the Mekong river.

Trat is 315 km (196 mi) from Bangkok. The province also serves as a major center for fruit growing, gem mining and fishing in the region.

== Toponymy ==
Trat is believed to be a corruption of krat (กราด) the Thai name for the tree Dipterocarpus intricatus, common to the region and used to make brooms. It is also spelt Trad.

== History ==
Historical affiliations

Khmer Empire 802–1431
Kingdom of Ayutthaya 1431–1767
Kingdom of Thonburi 1767-1782
Kingdom of Siam 1782–1893
French Third Republic 1893–1907
Kingdom of Siam 1907–1932
Kingdom of Thailand 1932–present

In 1408, Chinese writer and voyager Ma Huan made one of the earliest references to the gems found in modern-day Chanthaburi and Trat provinces.

The history of Trat can be traced back to the early 17th century during the reign of King Prasat Thong of the Ayutthaya Kingdom. Formerly known as Mueang Thung Yai, Trat has played an important role in the development of the country's stability and economy due to its strategic location. The town of Trat later become a community of Chinese merchants.

After the fall of Ayutthaya to the Burmese in 1767, Trat served as a checkpoint and buffer city and was responsible for providing provisions to King Taksin the Great before he moved his forces from Chanthaburi to Ayutthaya. King Taksin then succeeded in driving out the Burmese invaders, liberating the kingdom from foreign rule.

Beginning in the 1850s a gem rush began in modern-day Chanthaburi, Trat and Pailin provinces, resulting in an influx of immigrants from Burma who became the Kula people.

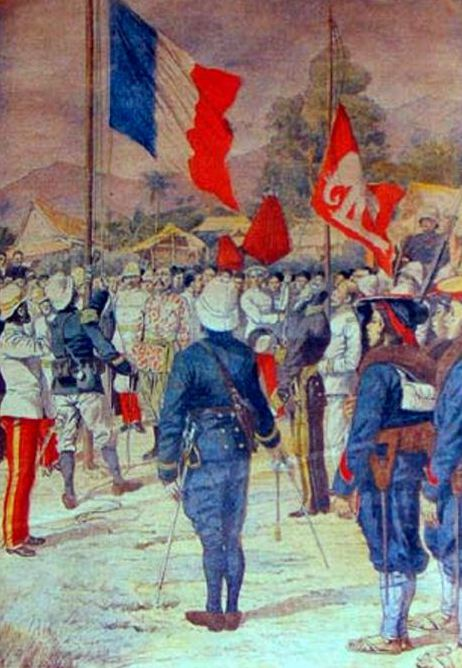
French troops, Trat (1904)

During the 1893 Franco-Siamese crisis, French troops landed and occupied Chanthaburi province. In order to regain Chanthaburi, the Siamese government negotiated with France in the 1904 Franco-Siamese Treaty where it was agreed France would return Chanthaburi to Siam in exchange for Siam handing over control of Trat and Koh Kong to the French. The treaty was signed on 13 February 1904, although Trat and Koh Kong had been officially handed over to the French on 22 January. During French colonial control, the appointed governor's official residence was Resident Kampot located in Trat City.

On 23 March 1907, it was agreed between Siam and France that France would return control of Trat, except Koh Kong, to the Siamese in exchange for the provinces of Phra Tabong (Battambang), Siem Reap, and Serei Sophoan which all had a Khmer majority population as part of the 1907 Franco-Siamese Treaty. On 6 July 1907, Trat was officially handed back to Siam.

During the French-Thai War of 1940–1941, the Vichy French navy sailed from Saigon to seize Trat. The unprepared Thai warships were caught by surprise. By the end of the 17 January 1941 Battle of Ko Chang, three Thai ships had been left sinking: the HTMS Chonburi, HTMS Songkhla, and HTMS Thonburi. French casualties were light with no ships lost. The Japanese government negotiated a truce, which ended the conflict without further fighting.

When the Vietnamese pushed the Khmer Rouge out of Cambodia in 1985, Pol Pot fled to Thailand and made his headquarters in a plantation villa near Trat. It was built for him by the Thai Army and nicknamed "Office 87".

As part of Vietnamese border raids in Thailand to eliminate Cambodian groups along the Thai-Cambodian border opposed to the Vietnamese-backed Cambodian governments, namely the Khmer Rouge, Vietnamese soldiers made several incursions into Trat province. In the Battle of Ban Chamrak, around 800 Vietnamese soldiers captured a portion of northern Chamrak sub-district on 1 April 1985. On 9 May, the area was recaptured by Thai marines, army rangers and border patrol police. The Thai side suffered one dead and eight injured, while eight Vietnamese were found dead.

== Geography ==
The province covers a land area of 2,917 km^{2} (1,126 sq mi). The total forest area is 899 km^{2} (347 sq mi) or 31.4 percent of provincial area.

The Cardamom mountain range forms the boundary to Cambodia in the east of the province, where Trat has borders with three Cambodian provinces: Battambang, Pursat, and Koh Kong.

The third biggest island of Thailand (after Phuket and Ko Samui) is the province's Ko Chang. The island and more than 40 surrounding smaller islands form the Mu Ko Chang Marine National Park.

Other islands of the province include Ko Kham, Ko Mak, and Ko Phi.

=== National parks ===
There are two national parks, along with five other national parks, make up region 2 (Si Racha) of Thailand's protected areas.(Visitors in fiscal year 2024)

Mu Ko Chang National Park	650 km^{2} (250 sq mi)	(182,635)
Namtok Khlong Kaeo National Park	198 km^{2} (76 sq mi)	(18,940)

== Climate ==
Most of Thailand receives from 1,400 mm (55 in) to 1,600 mm (63 in) of precipitation per year. Two provinces, Trat and Ranong, receive more than 4,500 mm (180 in) a year, making them the wettest places in the country.

== Economy ==
The economy of Trat province is mainly centered around agriculture and manufacturing with a small service sector.

Local businesses often participate in trade with Cambodians.

Within Thailand, Trat has the third largest rubber plantation at an area of 55,461.44 hectares (137,048.2 acres) in 2017. The first rubber cooperative in the province was established in 1994.

In order to better provide for themselves and their families, some farmers shifted away from monoculture farming towards orchard tourism, a form of agritourism.

=== Gem industry ===
Historically both Trat and Chanthaburi provinces were Thailand's principal area for ruby production, alongside being a major source of sapphires. The region had started becoming a major source of the world's rubies and sapphires supply in the late 1800s, however it lagged behind the Burmese gem industry. When the Burmese government nationalised their deposits in 1963, and the subsequent decline in the supply of gems coming of Burma, the Chanthaburi-Trat gem industry became one of the world's main suppliers. By 1982, an estimated 70% of the world's high-quality rubies originated from Thailand, of which 85% to 90% came from the Chanthaburi-Trat region, although Burma still led in quality. In 1980, an estimated 20,000 miners mined 39.4 million carats of rubies and sapphires.

Gem deposits in both provinces are alluvial, having been eroded from weathered basalt flows. During the Himalayan orogeny, the region was uplifted and intruded by granites and granodiorites. In the final portion of the orogeny, the region had basaltic dikes intrude the surface as basaltic lava flows. Since the end of the orogeny, the region became geologically quiet, with the tropical climate resulting in intense weathering and erosion. The region's deposits can be divided into two mining areas based on the corundum type produced: one entirely within Chanthaburi province, the other within Trat province. The Trat mining area contains the Bo Rai-Bo Waen mining area, which produced significant amounts of rubies, and occasionally green and colour change sapphires.

By 1996, most mining operations in the province had relocated to Cambodia, with Pailin province being contiguous to Thai deposits. Bo Rai, which had been very active, had declined back to a small town. In the 1990s, the Thai government banned commercial mining in the area due to its effects on the countryside. Due to overmining, ruby deposits in the region became depleted by 2009.

== Symbols ==
The provincial seal shows the sea with the Khao Banthat mountain range in the background.

The provincial tree is the tropical almond (Terminalia catappa). The species of grouper Plectropomus leopardus is the provincial aquatic life.

== Administration ==
=== Provincial government ===
The province is divided into seven districts (amphoes). These are further divided into 38 subdistricts (tambon) and 261 villages (mubans).

Map	#	Name	Thai	IPA	Subdivisions
— Districts —
	1	Mueang Trat	เมืองตราด	/məʊŋtrɑt/	14 tambons - 97 mubans
	2	Khlong Yai	คลองใหญ่	/klɔŋjɑɪ/	3 tambons - 20 mubans
	3	Khao Saming	เขาสมิง	/kăo-sà-mĭŋ/	8 tambons - 66 mubans
	4	Bo Rai	บ่อไร่	/bɔː rɑɪ/	5 tambons - 34 mubans
	5	Laem Ngop	แหลมงอบ	/læmŋɔːb/	4 tambons - 25 mubans
	6	Ko Kut	เกาะกูด	/gɔguːd/	2 tambons - 8 mubans
	7	Ko Chang	เกาะช้าง	/gɔtʃɑːŋ/	2 tambons - 9 mubans

=== Local government ===
As of 26 November 2019 there are: one Trat Provincial Administration Organisation (ongkan borihan suan changwat) and 14 municipal (thesaban) areas in the province. Trat has town (thesaban mueang) status. Further 13 subdistrict municipalities (thesaban tambon). The non-municipal areas are administered by 29 Subdistrict Administrative Organisations – SAO (ongkan borihan suan tambon).

== Transport ==
=== Air ===
Trat is served by Trat Airport, built and operated by Bangkok Airways.

== Human achievement index 2022 ==
Health	Education	Employment	Income
11	61	36	30
Housing	Family	Transport	Participation
62	66	35	6
Province Trat, with an HAI 2022 value of 0.6457 is "average", occupies place 31 in the ranking.

Since 2003, United Nations Development Programme (UNDP) in Thailand has tracked progress on human development at sub-national level using the Human achievement index (HAI), a composite index covering all the eight key areas of human development. National Economic and Social Development Board (NESDB) has taken over this task since 2017.

Rank	Classification
1–13	"High"
14–29	"Somewhat high"
30–45	"Average"
46–61	"Somewhat low"
62–77	"Low"

Map with provinces and HAI 2022 rankings

== Gallery ==
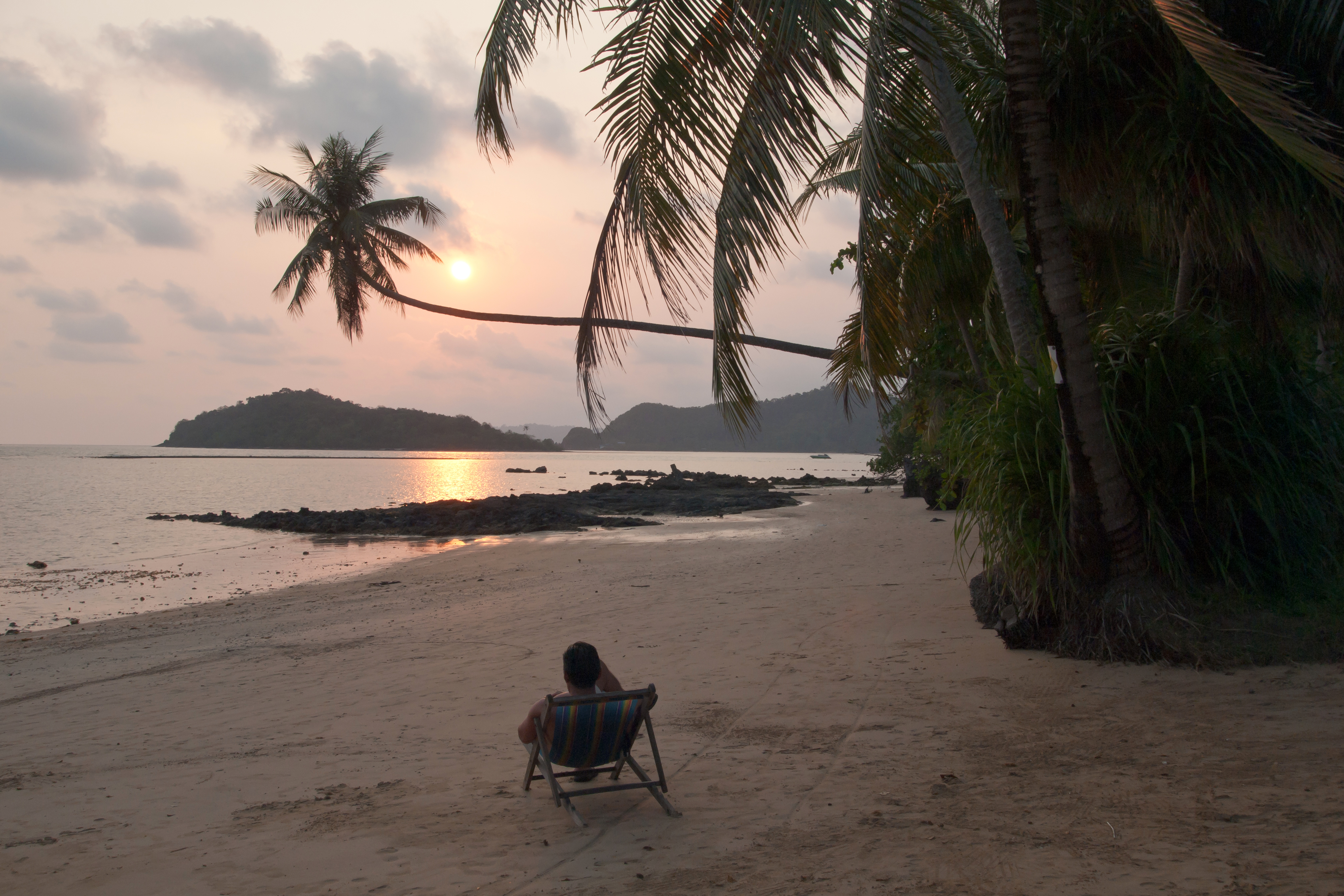
Ko Mak, sunset

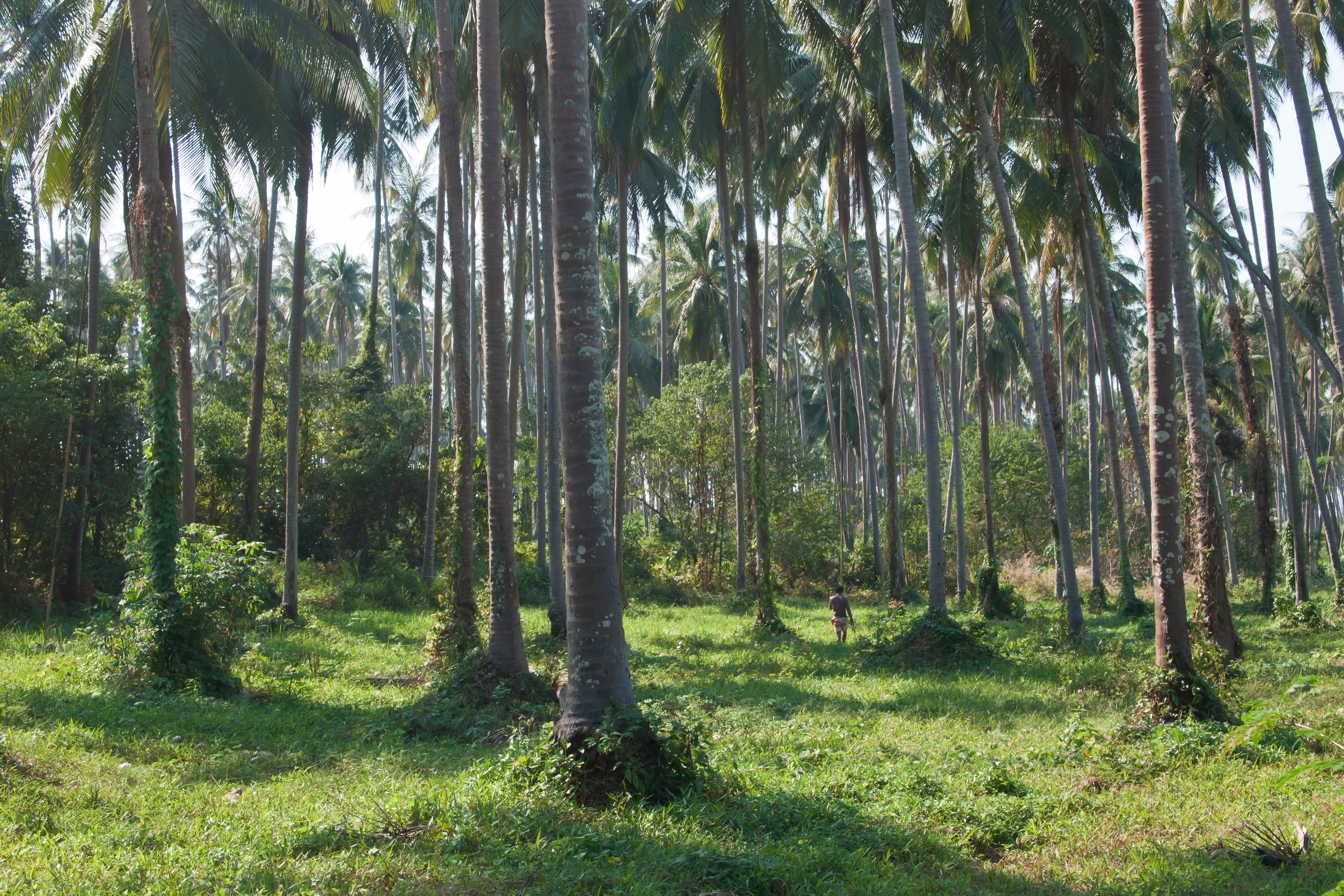
Ko Mak, coconut palm plantation

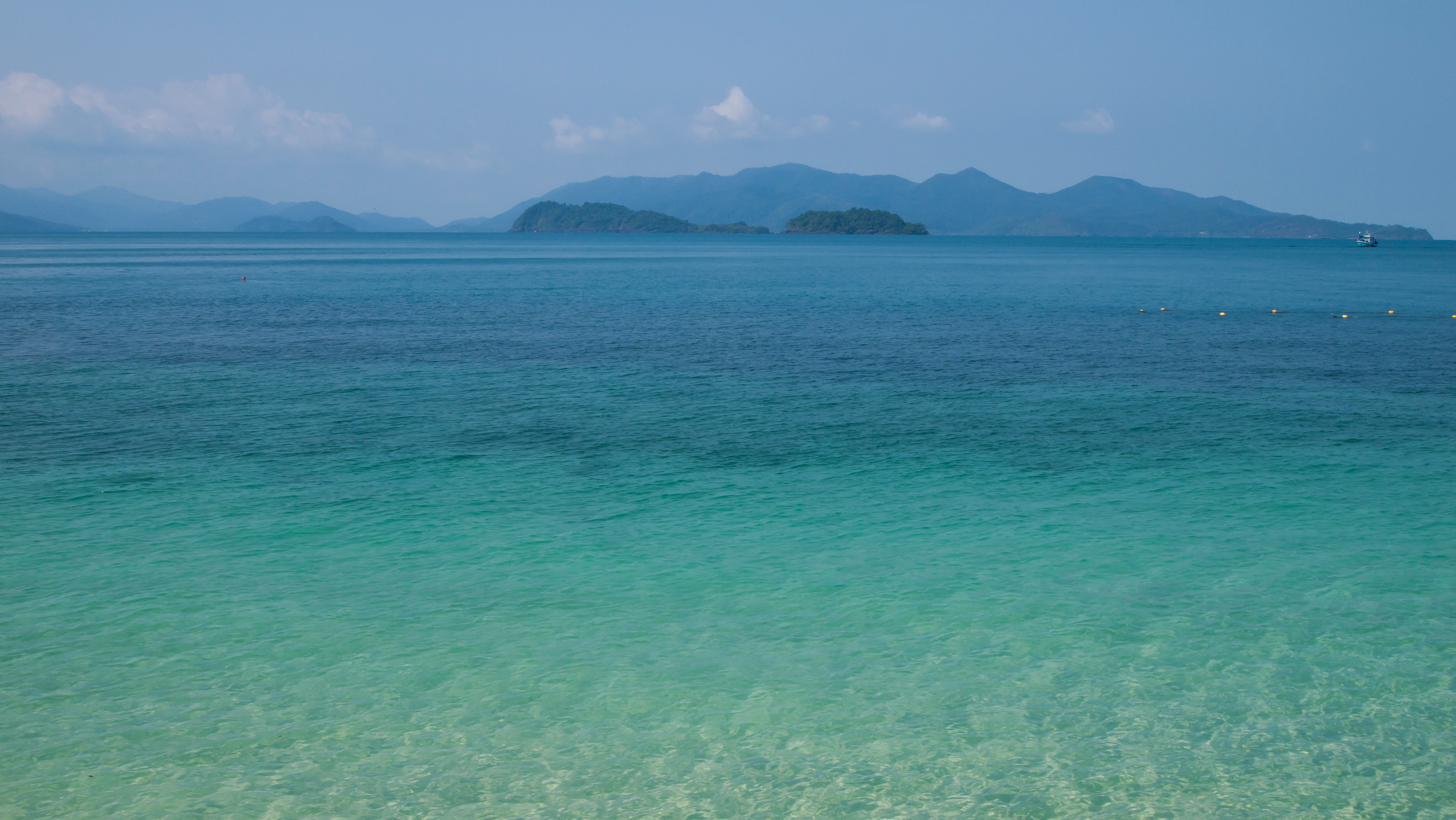
Panoramic view of Chang island group (with Trat coastline behind)

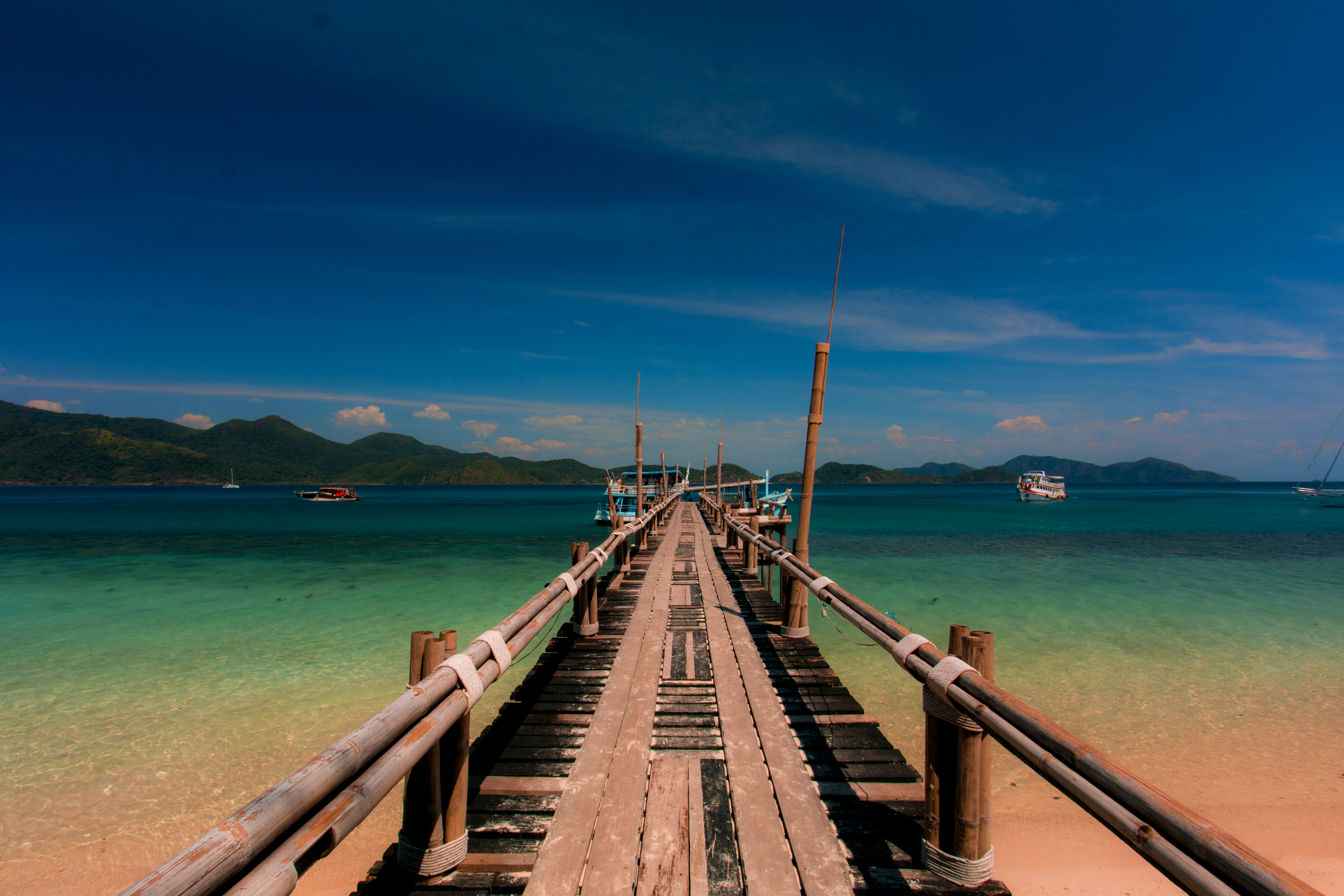
A wooden bridge to the pier at Ko Lao Ya Nai, Mu Ko Chang National Park

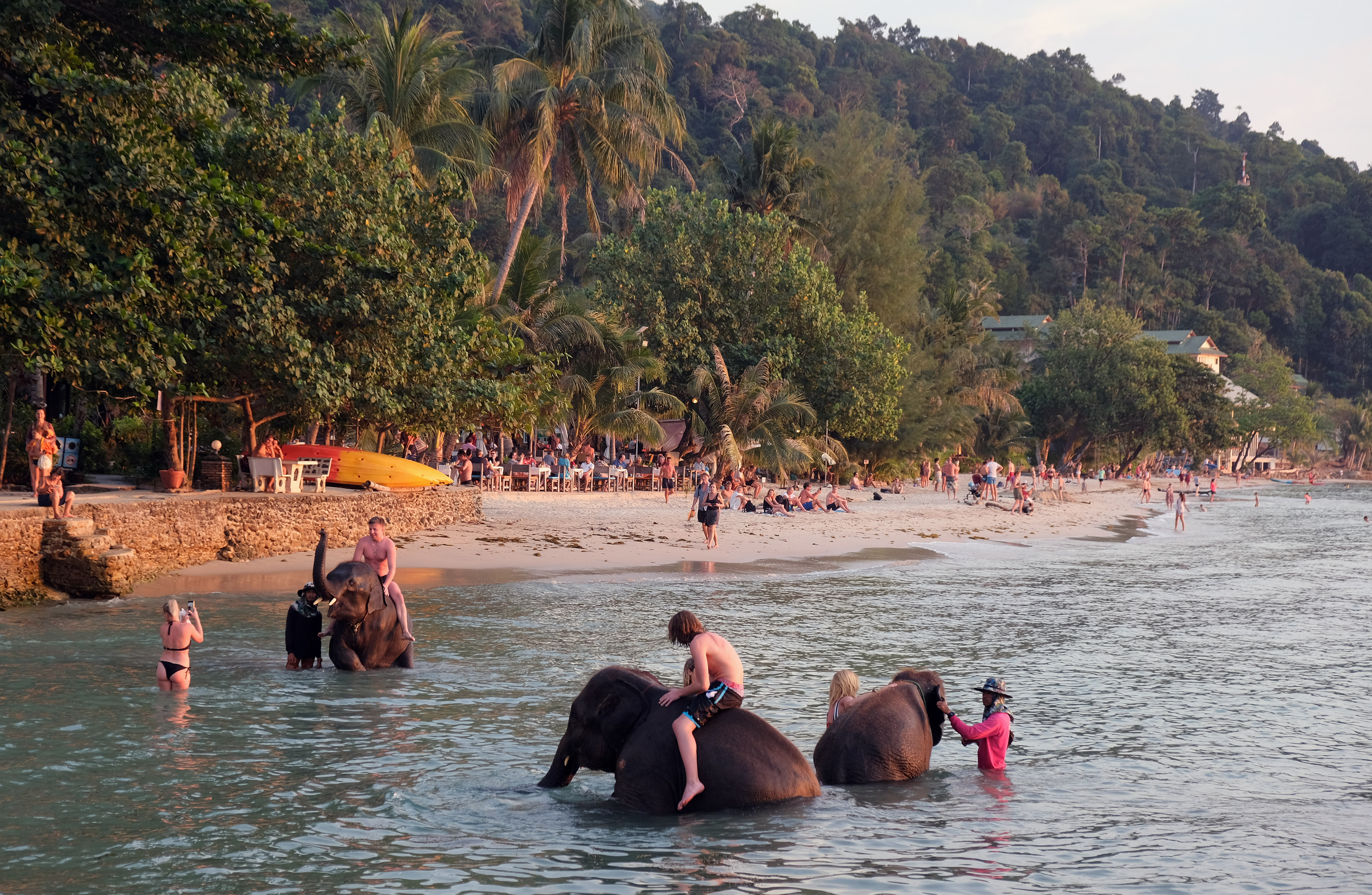
The third biggest island of Thailand, Ko Chang ('Elephant Island')

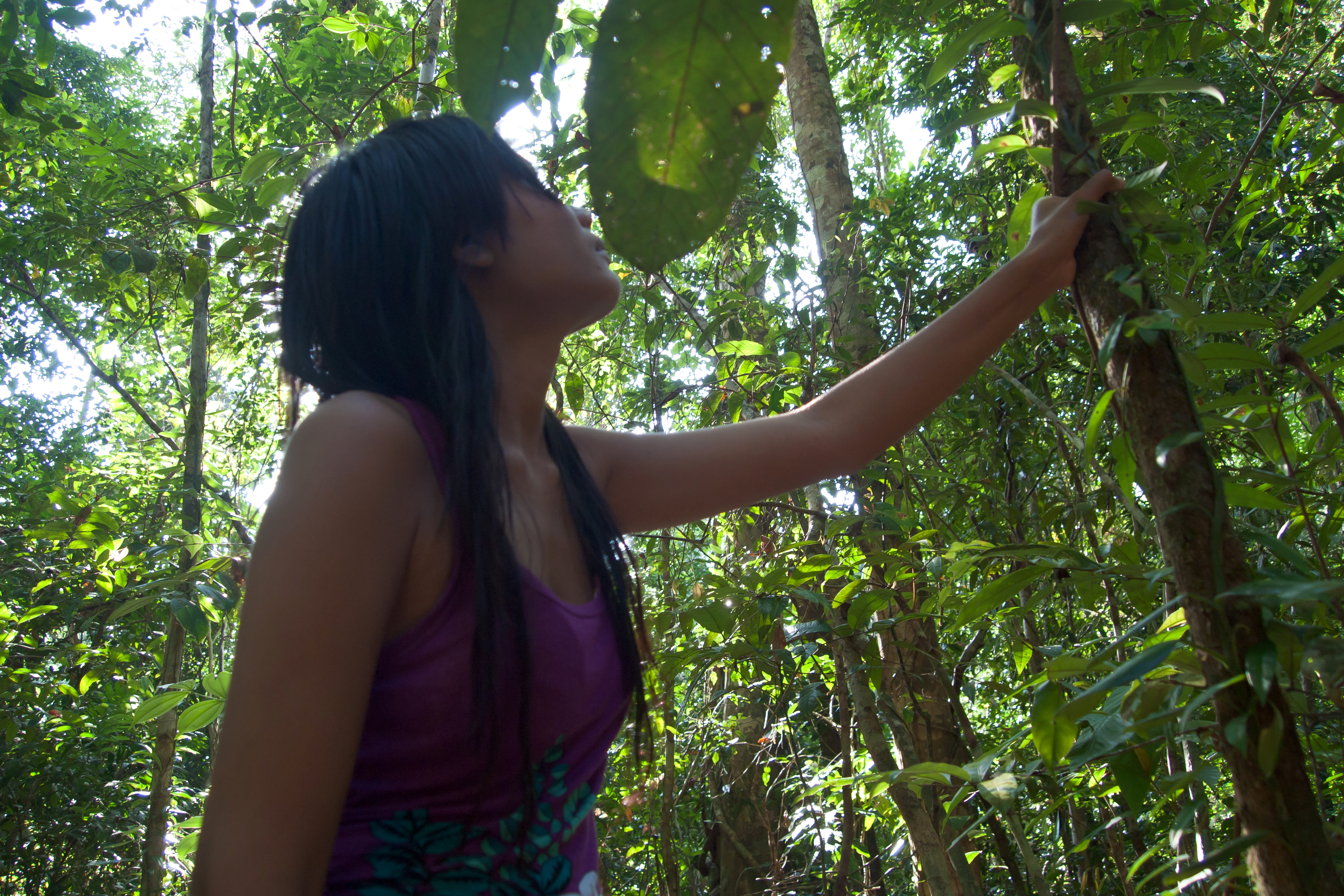
Tropical rainforest in the interior of Ko Kut

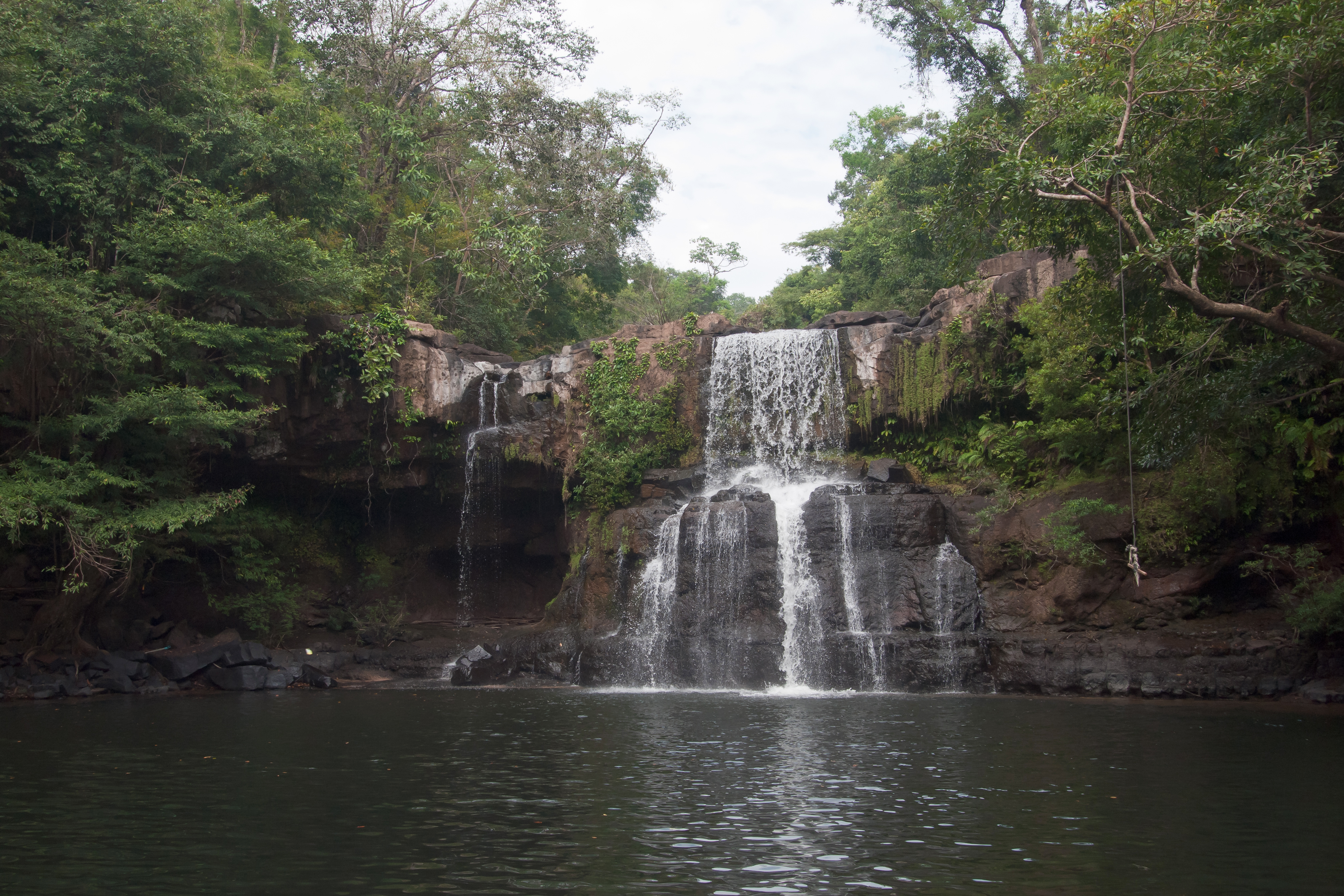
Ko Kut, island waterfall and lake

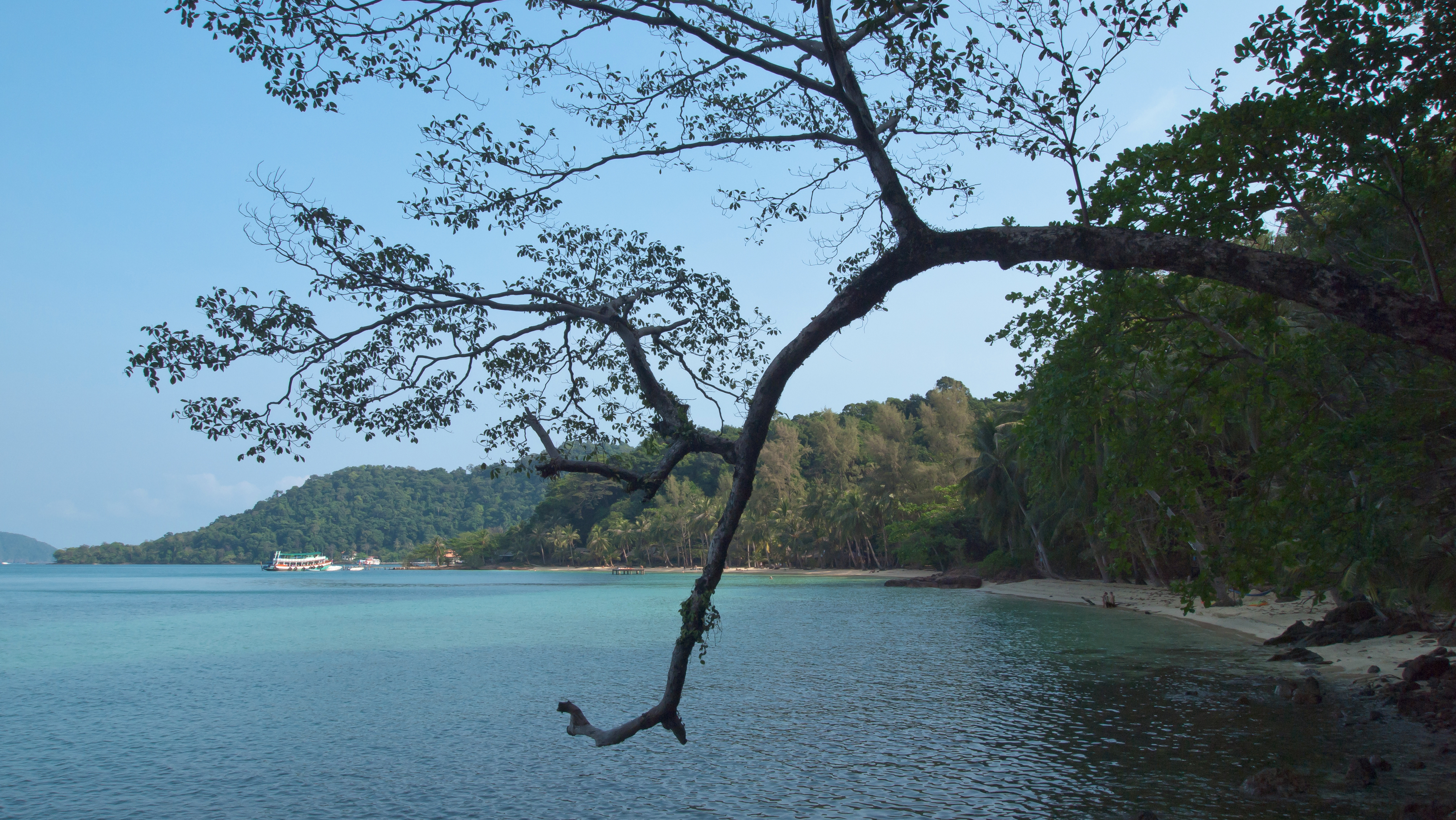
Tropical beach at Ko Wai
