= Laem Ngop district =

Laem Ngop แหลมงอบ
- District
- District location in Trat province
- Coordinates: 12°10′18″N 102°23′36″E
- Country: Thailand
- Province: Trat
- Seat: Laem Ngop

Area
  - Total: 154.0 km^{2} (59.5 sq mi)

Population (2000)
  - Total: 17,874
  - Density: 116.1/km^{2} (301/sq mi)
- Time zone: UTC+7 (ICT)
- Postal code: 23120
- Geocode: 2305

Laem Ngop (Thai: แหลมงอบ, pronounced [lɛ̌ːm ŋɔ̂ːp]) is a district (amphoe) of Trat province, eastern Thailand.

== History ==
The district was established in 1897 when it was named Ko Chang District. The district office was in Ban Dan Kao on Ko Chang. The district controlled all islands in Trat Province. As the district office was on an island, it was not convenient for most people on the mainland, thus the government moved the office to Ban Laem Ngop, but kept the district name unchanged. In 1939 the district's name was changed in accordance with the location of the district office.

== Geography ==
Neighboring districts are (from the north clockwise) Khlung of Chanthaburi province, Khao Saming, and Mueang Trat of Trat Province and the Gulf of Thailand.

== Administration ==
The district is divided into four sub-districts (tambons), which are further subdivided into 25 villages (mubans). There are two townships (thesaban tambon): Laem Ngop covers parts of the tambon Laem Ngop, and Nam Chiao the complete tambon Nam Chiao. There are a further three tambon administrative organizations (TAO).

1.	Laem Ngop	แหลมงอบ
2.	Nam Chiao	น้ำเชี่ยว
3.	Bang Pit	บางปิด
7.	Khlong Yai	คลองใหญ่

Missing numbers now for the districts Ko Kut and Ko Chang.
