= River systems of Thailand =

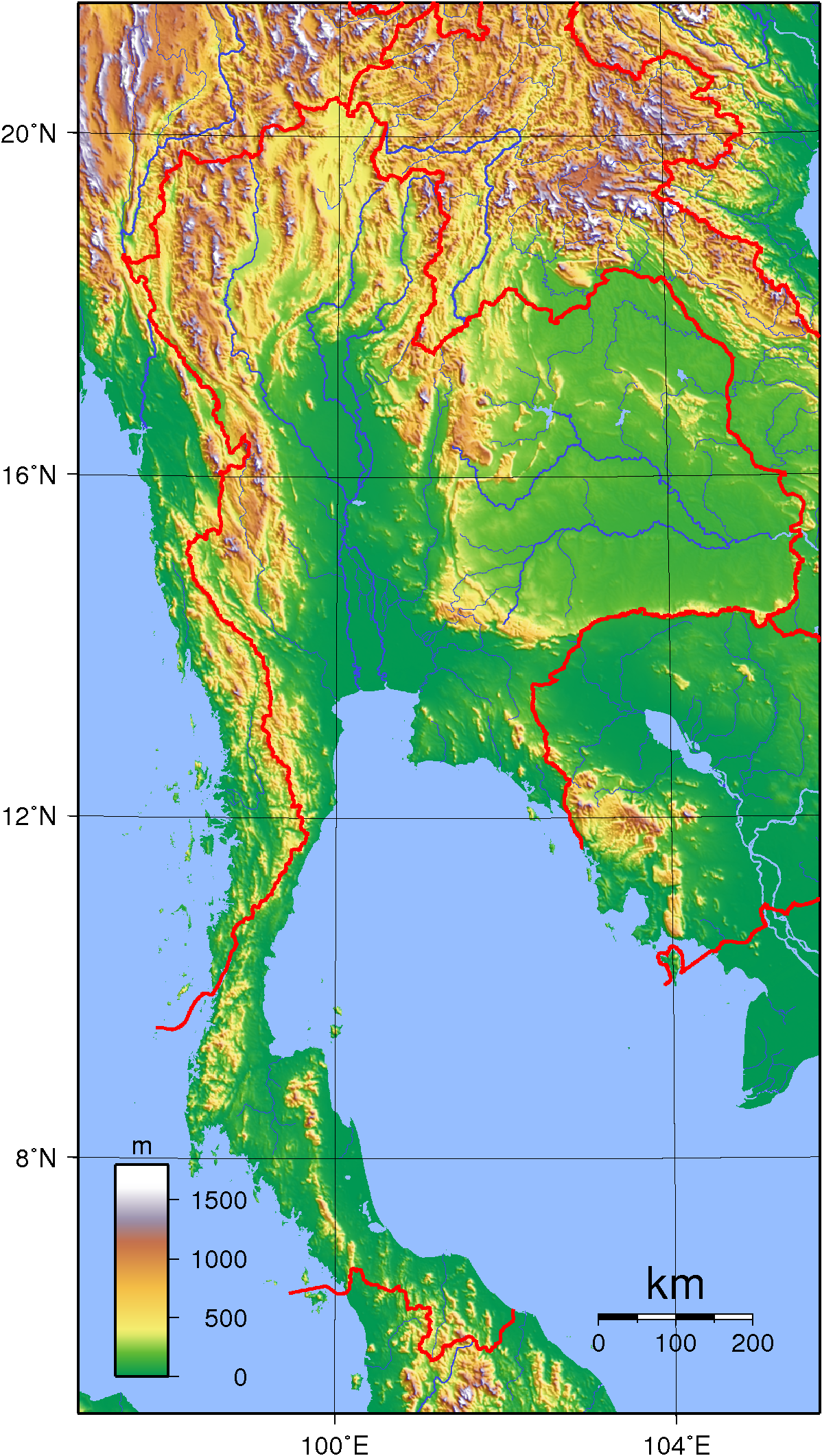
A topographic map of Thailand demonstrating primarily the Chao Phraya River System in the central plains and branches of the Mekong River System flowing west to east.

Thailand has 22 river basins with 254 sub-basins. Rainwater is one of the most important sources of water. Thailand's water resource per capita is less than that of other countries in the region.

The two principal river systems of Thailand are the Chao Phraya and the Mekong. Together, these rivers support the irrigation for Thailand's agricultural economy.

In addition to these two large systems, there are a number of other river systems and individual rivers which drain the lands within Thailand's borders into the Gulf of Thailand and the Andaman Sea. One-third of the nation's rivers flow into the Mekong. The Mekong is the only river system in Thailand which drains into the South China Sea.

== Chao Phraya River system ==
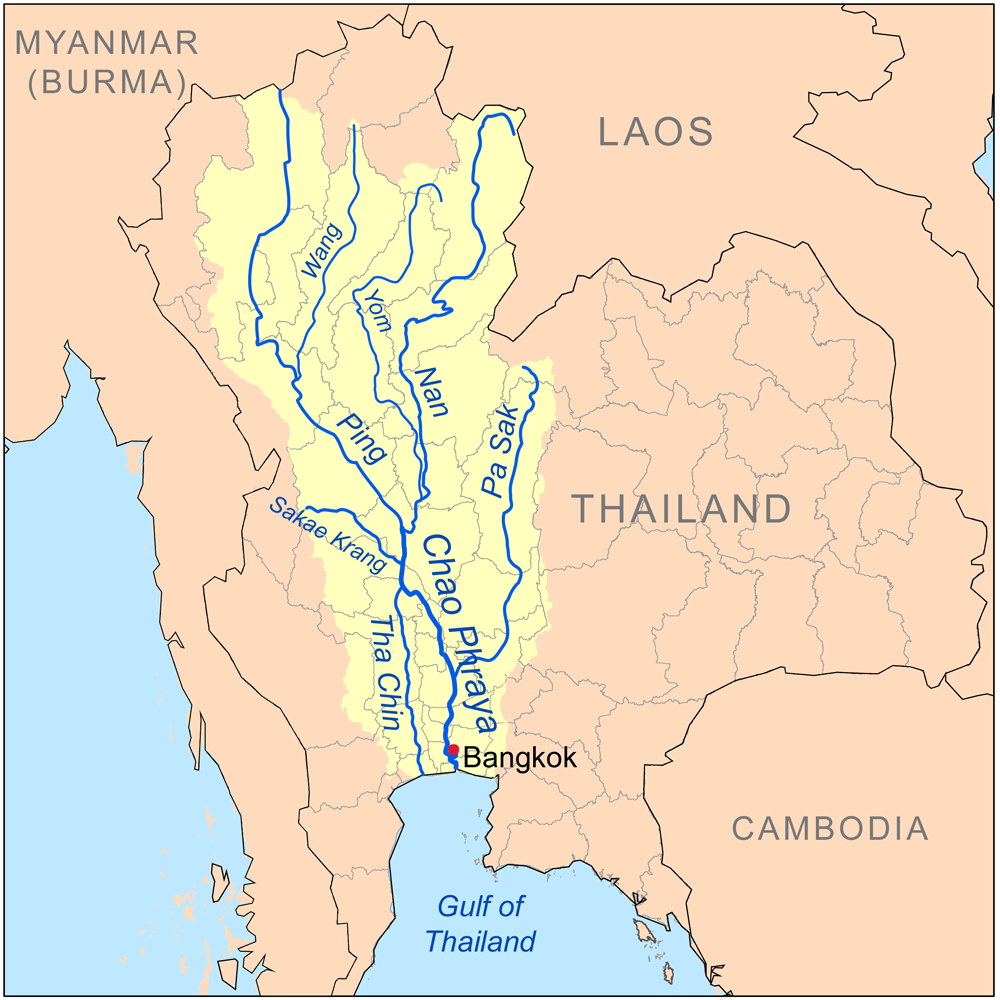
Chao Phraya River System.

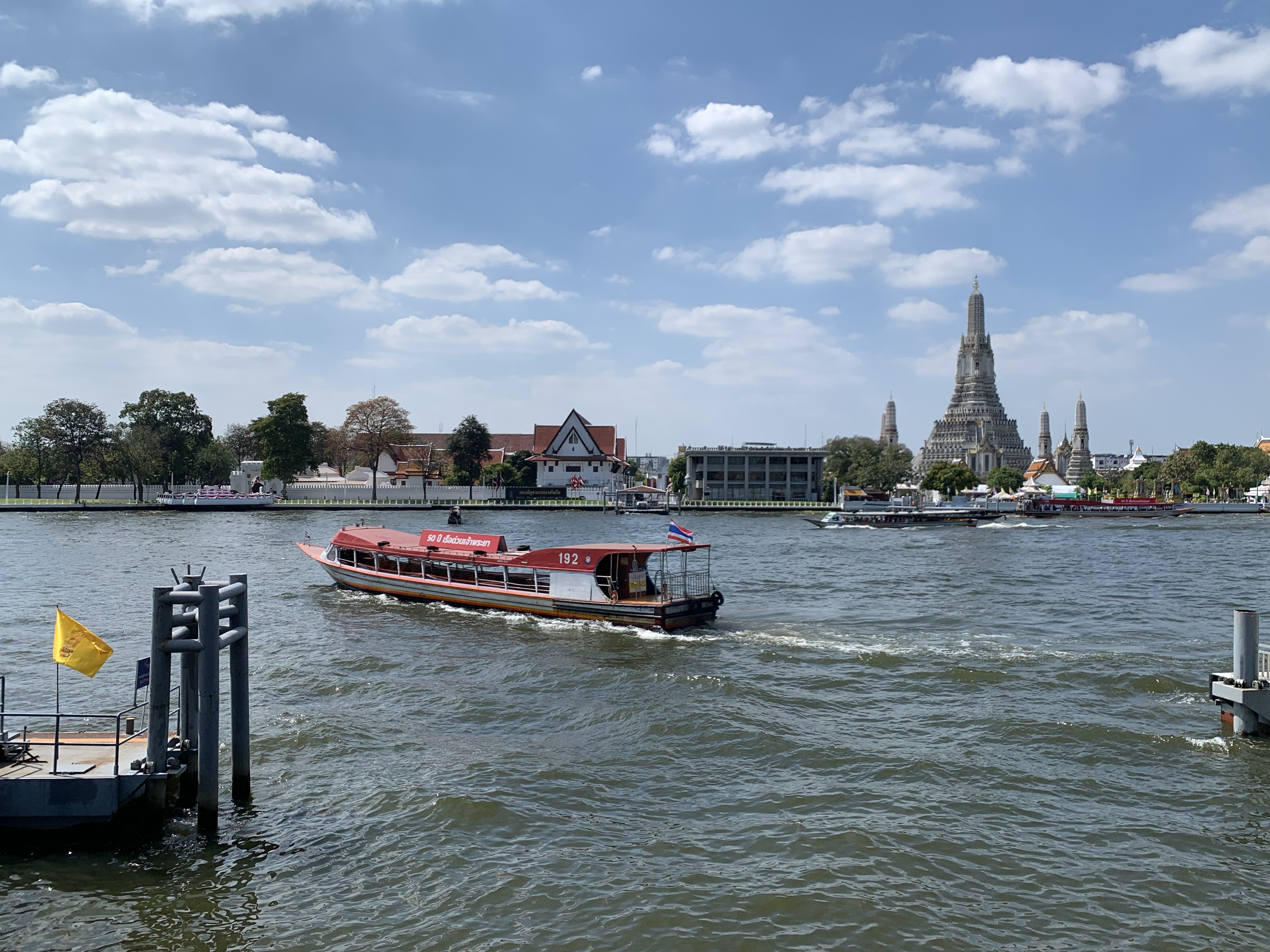
The Chao Phraya River in Bangkok

The Chao Phraya River system is the main river system of Thailand, as its basin defines much of the region of central Thailand. The Chao Phraya River begins at the confluence of the Ping and Nan Rivers at Nakhon Sawan (also called Pak Nam Pho) in Nakhon Sawan Province. It then flows from north to south for 372 kilometres (231 mi) from the central plains through Bangkok to the Gulf of Thailand. The Chao Phraya River Catchment area is approximately 17,270 km^{2}.

In Chai Nat, the river splits into the main river course and the Tha Chin River, which then flows parallel to the main river and exits to the Gulf of Thailand about 35 kilometres (22 mi) west of Bangkok in Samut Sakhon. In the low alluvial plain which begins below the Chai Nat Dam, many small canals (khlong) split off from the main river. The khlong are used for the irrigation of the region's rice paddies.

=== Tributaries ===
The principal tributaries of the Chao Phraya River are the Pa Sak River, the Sakae Krang River, the Nan River (along with its principal confluent the Yom River), the Ping River (with its principal confluent the Wang River), and the Tha Chin River. Each of these tributaries (and the Chao Phraya itself) is further tributed by additional minor tributaries often referred to as khwae. All of the tributaries, including the lesser khwae, form an extensive tree-like pattern, with branches flowing through nearly every province in central and northern Thailand.

None of the tributaries of the Chao Phraya extend beyond the nation's borders. The Nan and the Yom Rivers flow nearly parallel from Phitsanulok to Chumsaeng in the north of Nakhon Sawan Province. The Wang River enters the Ping River near Sam Ngao District in Tak Province.

=== Drainage ===
The expanse of the Chao Phraya River and its tributaries, i.e., the Chao Phraya river system, together with the land upon which falling rain drains into these bodies of water, form the Chao Phraya watershed. The Chao Phraya watershed is the largest in Thailand, covering approximately 35 percent of the nation's area, and draining an area of 157,924 square kilometres (60,975 sq mi).

== Lesser Gulf river systems ==
There are numerous rivers which flow into the Gulf of Thailand, including a number of west coast gulf rivers, east coast gulf rivers, and rivers which drain into the gulf on the east coast of the Malay Peninsula. The following river systems, in addition to the Chao Phraya, are the most significant gulf systems in Thailand:

=== Bang Pakong ===
The Bang Pakong River is a river in eastern Thailand. The river originates at the confluence of the Confluence of Phra Prong River and the Hanuman River near Kabin Buri District. It empties into the Gulf of Thailand in the northeastern tip of the Bay of Bangkok. The Bang Pakong's principal tributaries are the Nakhon Nayok River and the Tha Lat River. The watershed of the Bang Pakong is about 17,900 square kilometres (6,900 sq mi).

=== Phetchaburi ===
The Phetchaburi River is a river in western Thailand. It originates in Kaeng Krachan National Park, Kaeng Krachan District and flows through Tha Yang, Ban Lat, Mueang Phetchaburi and empties into the Bay of Bangkok in Ban Laem District. It is 210 kilometres (130 mi) long, most of which is in Phetchaburi Province.

=== Mae Klong ===
The Mae Klong River is a river in western Thailand. The river begins at the confluence of the Khwae Noi or Khwae Sai Yok and the Khwae Yai River or Khwae Si Sawat in Kanchanaburi, passes through Ratchaburi Province and empties into the Gulf of Thailand in Samut Songkhram.

=== Pran Buri ===
The Pran Buri River is in Prachuap Khiri Khan Province, on the Kra Isthmus of the Malay Peninsula. The Pran Buri River originates in southern part of the Kaeng Krachan National Park, and after 130 kilometres (81 mi) empties into the Gulf of Thailand. The only town on the river's course is Pran Buri, the center of Pran Buri District. The watershed of the Pran Buri River has an area of about 2,000 square kilometres (770 sq mi).

=== Khlong Kui ===
The Khlong Kui River drains into the Gulf of Thailand from the Malay Peninsula in Thailand. It flows through Ban Pong Kasang and Ban Thung Faek, Kui Buri District, Prachuap Khiri Khan Province.

=== Tapi and Phum Duang ===
The Tapi River with its main tributary Phum Duang drain the area of Surat Thani Province. The total watershed of the river system is about 11,500 square kilometres (4,400 sq mi).

=== Pattani ===
The Pattani River is the longest of all Thai rivers on the Malay Peninsula with a total length of 214 kilometres (133 mi).

=== Prasae ===
The Prasae River river runs 51 km from the Prasae Reservoir down to the town of Pak Nam Krasae in Rayong Province. It also passes the city of Klaeng

=== Mueang Treat ===
The Mueang Trat River, also called the Khao Saming River runs 55 km and empties into the Gulf of Thailand at Trat.

=== Tha Taphao River ===
The Tha Taphao River runs 41km from the cnfluence of the Rap Po River and the Tha Sae River in Chumphon to the city of Pak Nam Chumphon.

=== Trang River ===
The Trang River runs 123 km and empties in the Andaman Sea.

== Mekong River system ==
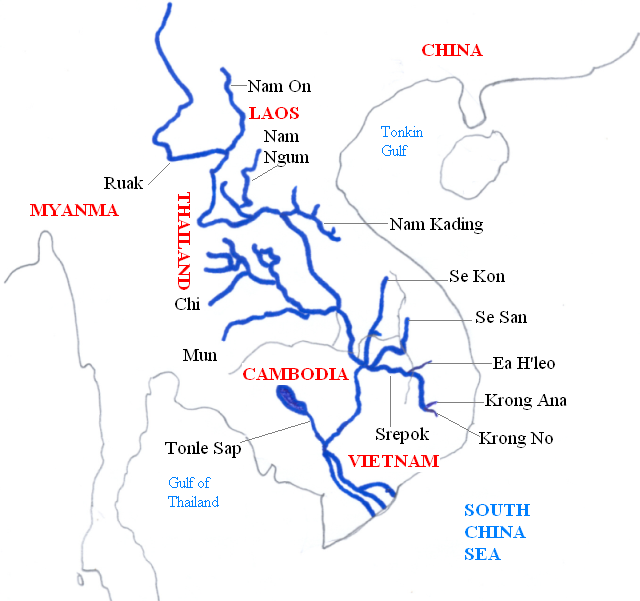
The Mekong River system

The Mekong River, one of the world's major rivers, drains into the South China Sea. It is the 11th-longest river in the world, and the 12th-largest by volume (discharging 475 cubic kilometres (114 cu mi) of water annually). Its estimated length is 4,880 kilometres (3,030 mi), and it drains an area of 810,000 square kilometres (310,000 sq mi).

From the Tibetan Plateau it runs through China's Yunnan Province, Myanmar, Thailand, Laos, Cambodia, and Vietnam. All except China and Myanmar are members of the Mekong River Commission. The extreme seasonal variations in flow and the presence of rapids and waterfalls have made navigation extremely difficult. Approximately half the river's length is in China, where it is known as the Lancang Jiang (澜沧江 Láncāng Jiāng) or Meigong in Chinese (Chinese: 湄公河; pinyin: Méigōng Hé).

The river forms the border between Myanmar and Laos for 200 kilometres (120 mi), at the end of which it meets the tributary Ruak River at the Golden Triangle. This point also marks the division between the Upper and Lower Mekong.

The river then divides Laos and Thailand, before a stretch passing through Laos alone. It is called Maenam Khong in both Lao and Thai (แม่น้ำโขง). The river again marks the Lao-Thai border in the stretch which passes Vientiane, followed by a short stretch through Laos alone.

In Cambodia, the river is called the Mékôngk or Tonle Thom ("great river"). Just above Phnom Penh is the confluence with the Tonle Sap, the main Cambodian tributary. Below Phnom Penh, it divides into the Bassac and the Mekong proper, which both flow into the Mekong Delta in Vietnam. In Vietnamese, the river as a whole is known as Mê Kông. In Vietnam, the river divides into two major branches, the Tiền Giang (Front River) and Hậu Giang (Back River). These in turn enter the South China Sea through nine estuaries.

=== Thai tributaries of the Mekong ===
The following are the principal tributaries of Mekong River which flow through Thailand (tributaries entirely outside the Thai border not shown).

- Ruak River (joins the Mekong in Thailand)
- Kok River (joins the Mekong in Thailand)
- Ing River (joins the Mekong in Thailand)
- Mun River (joins the Mekong in Thailand)
  - Chi River (joins the Mun in Thailand)
  - Lam Dom Noi (joins the Mun in Thailand)
  - Lam Takhong (joins the Mun in Thailand)
- Tonlé Sap River (joins the Mekong in Cambodia, but extends into Thailand)

=== Drainage ===
The Mekong drains a considerable portion of northeast Thailand. In terms of Thai territory drained, it is second only to the Chao Phraya system.

== Salawin River System ==
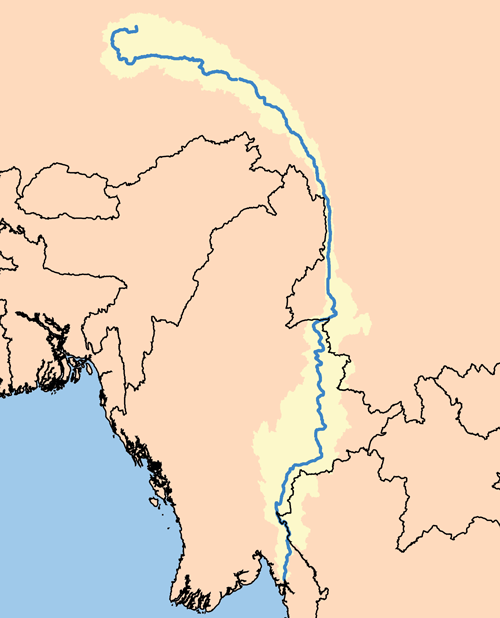
The Salawin River system.

The Salawin River rises in Tibet (Tibetan: རྒྱལ་མོ་རྔུལ་ཆུ།) after which it flows through Yunnan, where it is known as the Nujiang River (Chinese: 怒江; pinyin: Nù Jiāng), although either name can be used for the whole river. The river is 2,815 kilometres (1,749 mi) long. It then leaves China and meanders through Myanmar (where it is known as the Thanlwin) and Thailand (where it is known as the Salawin, Thai: สาละวิน) on its way to emptying into the Andaman Sea by Mawlamyaing (Moulmien).

=== Thai tributaries ===
The principal tributaries of the Salawin which flow through Thailand are the Moei River and the Pai River.

== Other Andaman Sea rivers ==
In addition to the Salween River, there are a number of rivers which drain into the Andaman Sea from the west coast of the Malay Peninsula. None of them are extensive enough to be considered river systems.
