= Bagrichthys vaillantii =

Conservation status
- Data Deficient (IUCN 3.1)

Scientific classification
- Kingdom: Animalia
- Phylum: Chordata
- Class: Actinopterygii
- Division: Teleostei
- Order: Siluriformes
- Family: Bagridae
- Genus: Bagrichthys
- Species: B. vaillantii

Binomial name
- Bagrichthys vaillantii (Popta, 1906)

Synonyms
- Leiocassis macropterus Vaillant, 1902; Bagroides vaillanti Popta, 1906

Species of fish

Bagrichthys vaillantii is a species of freshwater ray-finned fish belonging to the family Bagridae, the naked or bagrid catfishes. This catfish is endemic to Indonesia where it is found in eastern Borneo.

== Taxonomy ==
Bagrichthys vaillantii was first formally described as Leiocassis macropterus in 1902 by the French zoologist Leon Vaillant with its type locality given as Tepoe, Mahakam River in eastern Kalimantan, Borneo. In 1906 Canna Maria Louise Popta reclassified L. macropterus in the genus Bagroides, which had been described by Pieter Bleeker in 1857, with B. hypselopterus as its type species. However, the name macropterus was preoccupied in that genus by B. macropterus Bleeker, 1854 and Popta renamed the species Bagroides vaillantii, amending the type locality too. It was subsequently further reclassified into the genus Bagrichthys, a genus belonging to the family Bagridae, the bagrid or naked catfishes, which is classified in the suborder Siluroidei of the catfish order Siluriformes.

== Etymology ==
Bagrichthys vaillantii belongs to the genus Bagrichthys, a name which suffixes ichthys, meaning "fish", onto Bagrus, the genus the type species, B. hypselopterus was originally placed in. The specific name, vaillantii honours Leon Vaillant who originally described this species in 1902 but used a preoccupied epithet.

== Description ==
Bagrichthys vaillantii reaches a standard length of 19 cm (7.5 in). Compared to other Bagrichthys catfishes this species has a relatively large and wide mouth, well developed teeth in the mouth, with many of the teeth being visible and forming well-defined tooth bands. It also has a moderately elongate spine in its dorsal fin.

== Distribution ==
Bagrichthys vaillantii is only known from a limited number of specimens collected in the Mahakam River drainage in eastern Borneo. Like other Bagrichthys catfishes it probably lives in fast flowing, turbid rivers but little is known about this species.

== Conservation status ==
Bagrichthys vaillantii has been assessed as Data Deficient by the International Union for Conservation of Nature because little is know about the population trend and threats to its habitat of this species.
