= Trat (disambiguation) =

Trat is a town in Thailand, capital of Trat Province and the Mueang Trat district.

Trat may also refer to:

- Trat Province
- Mueang Trat District
- Trat River
- Trat Airport
