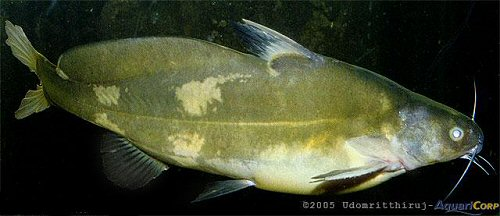

Conservation status
- Least Concern (IUCN 3.1)

Scientific classification
- Kingdom: Animalia
- Phylum: Chordata
- Class: Actinopterygii
- Division: Teleostei
- Order: Siluriformes
- Family: Bagridae
- Genus: Bagrichthys
- Species: B. obscurus

Binomial name
- Bagrichthys obscurus H. H. Ng, 1999

= Bagrichthys obscurus =

Species of bagrid catfish

Bagrichthys obscurus is a species of freshwater ray-finned fish belonging to the family Bagridae, the naked or bagrid catfishes. This catfish is endemic to Indochina.

== Taxonomy ==
Bagrichthys obscurus was first formally described in 1999 by the ichthyologist Heok Hee Ng with its type locality given as Lam Chi, 1.5 km (0.93 mi) below the highway 23 bridge, 4 km (2.5 mi) west of Selaphum, Roi Et province, Thailand. This species is classified in the genus Bagrichthys which had been described by Pieter Bleeker in 1857, with B. hypselopterus as its type species. The genus Bagrichthys is classified in the family Bagridae, the bagrid or naked catfishes, which is classified in the suborder Siluroidei of the catfish order Siluriformes.

== Etymology ==
Bagrichthys obscurus belongs to the genus Bagrichthys, a name which suffixes ichthys, meaning "fish", onto Bagrus, the genus the type species, B. hypselopterus was originally placed in. The specific name, obscurus is Latin, meaning "dark", although Ng said it meant "indistinct", an allusion to the plain brown colour of this catfish.

== Description ==
Bagrichthys obscurus has a fusiform body and reaches a standard length of 24.7 cm (9.7 in). Its dorsal fin contaosn a single, compartively short spine and 7 soft rays while the anal fin has between 7 and 10 soft rays. This species has a very small mouth and a highly reduced number of teeth. The adipose fin is short based. The males have genital papillae which reach the base of the first ray of the anal fin. The colour of this fish is plain brown with no plain markings.

== Distribution and habitat ==
Bagrichthys obscurus is found in Indochina, where it occurs in the Chao Phraya, Bang Pakong and Mekong river systems, being recorded from Thailand, Cambodia, Loas and Vietnam. This catfish is found in the larger tributaries of the Mekong, in turbid, slow flowing waters.

== Biology ==
Bagrichthys obscurus shows seasonal variations in occurrence and abundance which suggests that this is a migratory species. It spawns at the start of the rainy season, using the flooded forest for breeding. In the dry season it stays in deep water pools. It feeds on fishes, invertebrates and large amounts of plant detritus.

== Utilisation ==
Bagrichthys obscurus is fished for food by artisanal fishers and the juveniles are collected for the fishkeeping trade.
