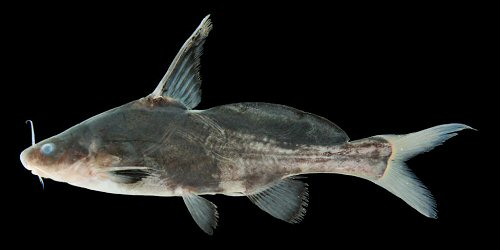

Conservation status
- Data Deficient (IUCN 3.1)

Scientific classification
- Kingdom: Animalia
- Phylum: Chordata
- Class: Actinopterygii
- Division: Teleostei
- Order: Siluriformes
- Family: Bagridae
- Genus: Bagrichthys
- Species: B. majusculus

Binomial name
- Bagrichthys majusculus H. H. Ng, 2002

= Bagrichthys majusculus =

Species of bagrid catfish

Bagrichthys majusculus is a species of freshwater ray-finned fish belonging to the family Bagridae, the naked or bagrid catfishes. This catfish is endemic to Indochina.

== Taxonomy ==
Bagrichthys majusculus was first formally described in 2002 by the ichthyologist Heok Hee Ng with its type locality given as the Mun River at Ban Dan, 3 km (1.9 mi) upstream from Mekong River confluence, Khong Chiam district, Ubon Ratchathani province, Thailand. This species is classified in the genus Bagrichthys which had been described by Pieter Bleeker in 1857, with B. hypselopterus as its type species. The genus Bagrichthys is classified in the family Bagridae, the bagrid or naked catfishes, which is classified in the suborder Siluroidei of the catfish order Siluriformes.

== Etymology ==
Bagrichthys majusculus belongs to the genus Bagrichthys, a name which suffixes ichthys, meaning "fish", onto Bagrus, the genus the type species, B. hypselopterus was originally placed in. The specific name, majusculus is Latin, meaning "somewhat greater", an allusion to the comparatively larger adipose-fin base and pectoral and dorsal fins when compared with B. macracanthus, its closest relative in its genus.

== Description ==
Bagrichthys majusculus has a mouth that is relatively large and broad. They have an oral dentition with teeth that are homodont that is well-developed. They have a gill-raker count of 10-13, a dorsal spine that is moderately long with 15-27 serrations.

== Distribution ==
Bagrichthys majusculus is found in Indochina, where it occurs in the Mekong and Chao Praya river systems. This catfish is found in larger streams and rivers, where there is turbid water and a sandy/muddy riverbed.

== Conservation status ==
Bagrichthys majusculus has been assessed as Data Deficient by the International Union for Conservation of Nature because little is know about this uncommon, seasonally migrant species.
