= Bagrichthys micranodus =

Conservation status
- Data Deficient (IUCN 3.1)

Scientific classification
- Kingdom: Animalia
- Phylum: Chordata
- Class: Actinopterygii
- Division: Teleostei
- Order: Siluriformes
- Family: Bagridae
- Genus: Bagrichthys
- Species: B. micranodus

Binomial name
- Bagrichthys micranodus T. R. Roberts, 1989

Species of fish

Bagrichthys micranodus is a species of freshwater ray-finned fish belonging to the family Bagridae, the naked catfishes. This catfish is found in southeast Asia where it is endemic to Indonesia.

== Taxonomy ==
Bagrichthys micranodus was first formally described in 2012 by the American ichthyologist Tyson R. Roberts with its type locality given as the mainstream of the Kapuas River, 58 km (36 mi) northeast of Sintang and 1 km (0.62 mi) downstream from Sebruang, Borneo. This species is classified within the family Bagridae, the naked or bagrid catfishes, which is classified in the suborder Siluroidei of the catfish order Siluriformes.

== Etymology ==
Bagrichthys micranodus belongs to the genus Bagrichthys, a name which suffixes ichthys, meaning "fish", onto Bagrus, the genus the type species, B. hypselopterus was originally placed in. The specific name, micranodus combines micro, meaning "small", with an, which means "without", and odous, meaning "tooth". This refers to the almost toothless jaws of this species.

== Description ==
Bagrichthys micranodus reaches a standard length of 18.5 cm (7.3 in). This species is similar to 'B. macropterus in having virtually toothless jaws but differs in being smaller in size, having longer barbels which mostly have ribbon-like margins, marginally longer fin spines, a slightly longer caudal peduncle. Thhe color is generally darker and diifers from that of B. macropterus but the mark on the nape is usually thinner and does not meet on the back.

== Distribution and habitat ==
Bagrichthys micranodus is endemic to Indonesia where it is found in the Kapuas River drainage in western Kalimantan where it has been collecetd from large, turbid rivers. It is a demersal species.
