= Rivomarginella morrisoni =

Conservation status
- Data Deficient (IUCN 3.1)

Scientific classification
- Kingdom: Animalia
- Phylum: Mollusca
- Class: Gastropoda
- Subclass: Caenogastropoda
- Order: Neogastropoda
- Family: Marginellidae
- Genus: Rivomarginella
- Species: R. morrisoni

Binomial name
- Rivomarginella morrisoni Brandt, 1968

Species of gastropod

Rivomarginella morrisoni is a species of freshwater snail, gastropod mollusk in the family Marginellidae, the margin snails.

Rivomarginella morrisoni is the type species of the genus Rivomarginella.

== Distribution ==
It is native to central Thailand: Mae Klong River, Prachin Buri River, Nan River, Klong Bang O, Klong Ban Yikkan, Klong Prapa, Klong Rapipat.

The type locality is Prachin Buri River, Kabin Buri District, Thailand.

== Description ==
The height of the shell is 5.4 - 11.3 mm.

== Ecology ==
Rivomarginella morrisoni lives in rivers, lakes, and canals.
