= Hanuman River Railway bridge =

Hanuman River Railway bridge สะพานข้ามแควหนุมาน
- Coordinates: 13°59′34″N 101°42′51″E
- Carries: 1 Railway track
- Crosses: Hanuman River
- Locale: Kabin Buri District, Prachinburi Province
- Official name: Hanuman River Railway bridge
- Maintained by: State Railway of Thailand

Characteristics
- Design: Truss bridge
- Total length: ?

History
- Constructed by: TAKIGAMI STEEL CONSTRUCTION
- Opened: 1970

Location
- Interactive map of Hanuman River Railway bridge

Hanuman River Railway bridge is a three-span railway bridge crossing the Hanuman River. It is situated in Kabin Buri District, Prachinburi Province, Thailand, on the Eastern Line Railway, near Kabin Buri railway station. There are three spans.

== Features ==
It is a three-span truss bridge. The second span is different and taller than the first and third span.
