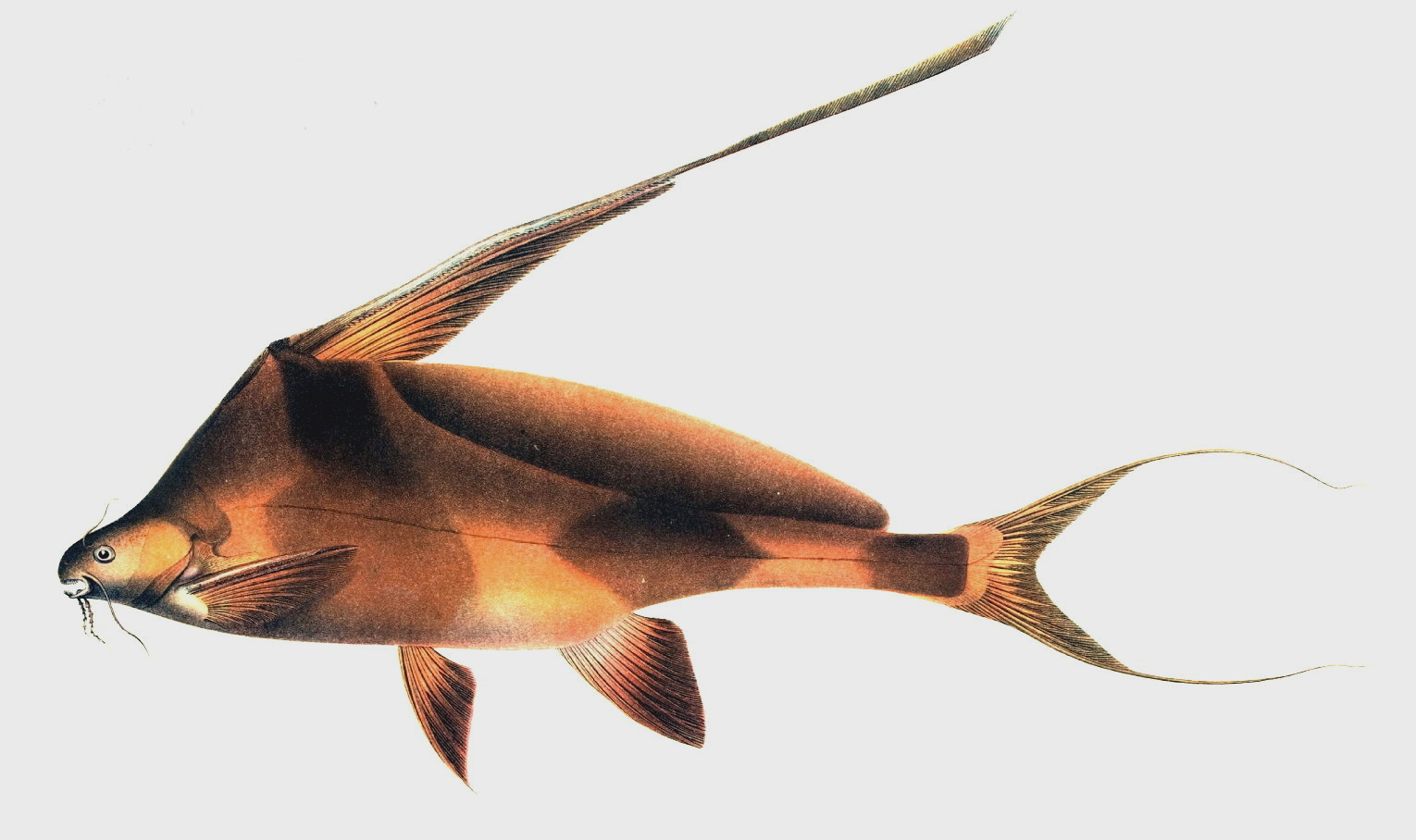
- Bagrichthys hypselopterus

Scientific classification
- Domain: Eukaryota
- Kingdom: Animalia
- Phylum: Chordata
- Class: Actinopterygii
- Order: Siluriformes
- Family: Bagridae
- Genus: Bagrichthys; Bleeker, 1857

Type species
- Bagrus hypselopterus Bleeker, 1852

Synonyms
- Pseudobagrichthys; Bleeker, 1862

= Bagrichthys =

Genus of fishes

Bagrichthys is a genus of bagrid catfishes.

== Taxonomy ==
This genus is most closely related to the genus Bagroides. In turn, these two genera are most closely related to Leiocassis. The genus can be split into two lineages. B. hypselopterus, B. macracanthus, B. majusculus, and B. vaillantii have long dorsal fins with 18 or more serrations in adults, while B. macropterus, B. micranodus, and B. obscurus have short dorsal fins with 15 or fewer serrations in adults. The first lineage is more derived, while the second lineage is more basal.

== Species ==
This genus currently contains seven described species:

- Bagrichthys hypselopterus (Bleeker, 1852)
- Bagrichthys macracanthus (Bleeker, 1854) (Black lancer, Black lancer catfish)
- Bagrichthys macropterus (Bleeker, 1854) (False black lancer, False black lancer catfish)
- Bagrichthys majusculus H. H. Ng, 2002
- Bagrichthys micranodus T. R. Roberts, 1989
- Bagrichthys obscurus H. H. Ng, 1999
- Bagrichthys vaillantii (Popta, 1906)

== Distribution ==
Members of this genus are found in Southeast Asia.

== Description ==
Bagrichthys catfishes are highly specialized. Fish of this genus are characterised by their elongate and laterally compressed caudal peduncle, the dorsally-directed serrations on the posterior edge of the dorsal fin spine, gill membranes united at the isthmus, and a long adipose fin without a free posterior margin. These fish can grow between about 20–40 centimetres (8–16 in) in length. The coloration of Bagrichthys species varies from tan to black; however, coloration can vary between individuals based on environmental conditions. These species have a small narrow mouth, moderately elongate convoluted intestines, and greatly reduced oral dentition.

Many of the Bagrichthys species appear rather similar. B. obscurus and B. majusculus were both identified after it was recognized that they were different species from B. macropterus and B. macracanthus, respectively, which these two species had previously been misidentified as.

The male can be distinguished from the female. The male possesses a genital papilla just before the anal fin, while the female does not. Also, in B. majusculus, B. obscurus, and B. vaillantii the nasal and maxillary barbels of males are more than twice as long as barbels of females; this may hold true for the whole genus.

== Ecology ==
Bagrichthys species live in large muddy rivers throughout Southeast Asia. However, juveniles may be found in smaller streams and flooded forests during the rainy season. The normal habitats of Bagrichthys species are large, slow-flowing rivers, generally acidic(pH 5–6) and with turbid water and a muddy substrate.

Bagrichthys species are reported to feed on small fishes, benthic invertebrates, and large amounts of plant detritus. B. hypselopterus consumes large amounts of silt as it targets chironomid larvae and pupae. B. macropterus may be molluscivorous as their guts have been found to contain large quantities of Rivomarginella gastropod shells.

These species spawn in the beginning of the rainy season and utilize flooded forests along the river edge. Juveniles appear in August.

== In the aquarium ==
B. macracanthus, the Black lancer, is the only species of this genus that is traded for the aquarium hobby. When these fish are first imported, they are often young and in bad condition. It has been recommended to acclimate these fish at a high temperature (about 29 °C or 85 °F). Though nocturnal, this species may be trained to eat in the light; it may even be trained to feed from the owner's hand. These fish tend to be territorial among their own kinds though this behavior can be reduced by placing a male with multiple females. This species is quite adaptable with pH and DH and will thrive as long as extremes are avoided.
