= B. orientalis =

B. orientalis may refer to:

- Bagrus orientalis, a fish species found in Malawi and Tanzania
- Bangasternus orientalis, the yellow starthistle bud weevil, a beetle species native to southern Europe and the Mediterranean
- Batis orientalis, the grey-headed batis, a bird species found in Africa
- Berlinia orientalis, a legume species found in Mozambique and Tanzania
- Blatta orientalis, the oriental cockroach or waterbug, a large cockroach species
- Bolbena orientalis, a praying mantis species
- Bombina orientalis, the Oriental fire-bellied toad, a small semi-aquatic toad species found in Korea, north-eastern China and adjacent parts of Russia
- Braula orientalis, a bee lice fly species in the genus Braula
- Brunnera orientalis, a plant species in the genus Brunnera
- Bunias orientalis, a plant species

== See also ==
- Orientalis (disambiguation)
