= Mueang Trat River =

Mueang Trat River Trat River, Khao Saming River, Khlong Khao Saming, Khlong Yai

Location
- Country: Thailand
- Province: Trat

Physical characteristics
- Source: Confluence of Khlong Sato and Khlong Ang
  - location: Bo Phloi, Bo Rai and Sato with Wang Takhian, Khao Saming
  - coordinates: 12°29′36.0″N 102°28′59.2″E
- Mouth: Ao Trat
  - location: Nong Khan Song and Tha Phrik, Mueang Trat
  - coordinates: 12°11′26.1″N 102°34′14.7″E
- Length: 55 kilometres (34 miles)

Basin features
- River system: East coast basin

Mueang Trat River (Thai: แม่น้ำเมืองตราด, pronounced [mɛ̂ːnáːm mɯ̄a̯ŋ tràːt]), or just called Trat River (แม่น้ำตราด, pronounced [mɛ̂ːnáːm tràːt]) is the longest and largest river in Trat province, eastern Thailand.

It originated from the canals Khlong Sato and Khlong Ang, which receive water from the Banthat range, flowing together at the border Bo Rai and Khao Saming districts. Then it flows south, passing through Khao Saming district to the southeast, entering Mueang Trat district, and passing through the downtown Trat, before emptying into Ao Trat, part of the Gulf of Thailand. It is approximately 55 km (34.2 mi) long.

As it flows through Khao Saming district, it is called Khao Saming River (แม่น้ำเขาสมิง, pronounced [mɛ̂ːnáːm kʰǎw sā.mǐŋ]), otherwise known as Khlong Khao Saming (คลองเขาสมิง, pronounced [kʰlɔ̄ːŋ kʰǎw sā.mǐŋ]) or Khlong Yai (คลองใหญ่, pronounced [kʰlɔ̄ːŋ jàj]).

The water in the Trat river in the portion of the Khao Saming river is murky red and flows rapidly. In 1931, it was also recorded as the first place in Thailand where an Asian arowana, a rare species living fossil fish was caught for the first time by a local boy scout. The caught fish was 26 cm long and specimen were sent to Bangkok for species identification. Currently, believed to have been locally extinct.

Mueang Trat river is an important transportation route from the past to the present. In the area of Mueang Trat, there were junks that sailed in and docked to pick up and deliver goods. At present, there are many ports along the river where fishing boats congregate along the jetty.
