= Bagrichthys macracanthus =

Conservation status
- Least Concern (IUCN 3.1)

Scientific classification
- Kingdom: Animalia
- Phylum: Chordata
- Class: Actinopterygii
- Division: Teleostei
- Order: Siluriformes
- Family: Bagridae
- Genus: Bagrichthys
- Species: B. macracanthus

Binomial name
- Bagrichthys macracanthus (Bleeker, 1854)

Synonyms
- Bagroides macracanthus Bleeker, 1854; Leiocassis macracanthus (Bleeker 1854)

Species of bagrid catfish

Bagrichthys macracanthus, the black lancer or humped stinging catfish, is a species of freshwater ray-finned fish belonging to the family Bagridae, the naked catfishes. This catfish is found in southeast Asia where it is found in Indonesia and Malaysia. This species appears in the fishkeeping trade.

== Taxonomy ==
Bagrichthys macracanthus was first formally described as Bagroides macracanthus in 1854 by the Dutch physician and ichthyologist Pieter Bleeker with its type locality given as eastern Sumatra. This species is now classified in the genus Bagrichthys which had been described by Bleeker in 1857, with B. hypselopterus as its type species. The genus Bagrichthys is classified in the family Bagridae, the bagrid or naked catfishes, which is classified in the suborder Siluroidei of the catfish order Siluriformes.

== Etymology ==
Bagrichthys macracanthus belongs to the genus Bagrichthys, a name which suffixes ichthys, meaning "fish", onto Bagrus, the genus the type species, B. hypselopterus was originally placed in. The specific name, macracanthus combines macro, meaning "long" or "large", with acanthus, meaning "thorn". This refers to the dorsal fin spine that is greater in height than the length of the head.

== Description ==
Bagrichthys macracanthus has an elongated body and reaches a standard length of 25 cm (9.8 in). There is a single spine in the dorsal fin which also has 7 soft rays, the anal fin has 13 or 14 soft rays. The barbels on the nose extend as far as or past the eyes when flatened, the barbels on the lower jaw extend as far as the gill cover or pectoral fin, the other barbels on the head are shorter. The dorsal fin spine is elongated and serrated, its height is greater than the body's depth. It has a very large and long adipose fin which has its origin immeditely to the rear of the dorsal fin. It has a large wide mouth. The body is dark brown or black with a lighter coloured strip along the lateral line, there may also be 2 or 3 irregularly shaped verycal, yellowish bands.

== Distribution and habitat ==
Bagrichthys macracanthus is found in Southeast Asia in Malaysia and Indonesia. In Peninsular Malaysia it occurs in the drainages of the Bernam and the Pahang River, in Sarawak in East Malaysia it occurs in the Rajang River. In Indonesia it is found on Sumatra in the Musi River system while in Kalimantan it is known from the Kapuas River, Kayan River and Barito River. The black lancer is found in streams and rivers draining from blackwater peat swamp forests, where the water is normallysatined with tannin and has a pH of less than 6.0.

== Fishkeeping trade ==
Bagrichthys macracanthus is the only species of the genus Bagrichthys that is traded for the aquarium hobby. When these fish are first imported, they are often young and in bad condition; and thus, it is recommended to acclimate them at a high temperature (about 29 °C or 85 °F). Though nocturnal, this species may be trained to eat in the light; it may even be trained to feed from the owner's hand. These fish tend to be territorial among their own kinds though this behavior can be reduced by placing a male with multiple females. This species is quite adaptable with pH and DH and will thrive as long as extremes are avoided.
