= Wat Sothonwararam =

Buddhist temple in Thailand

Coordinates: 13.6737°N 101.0673°E

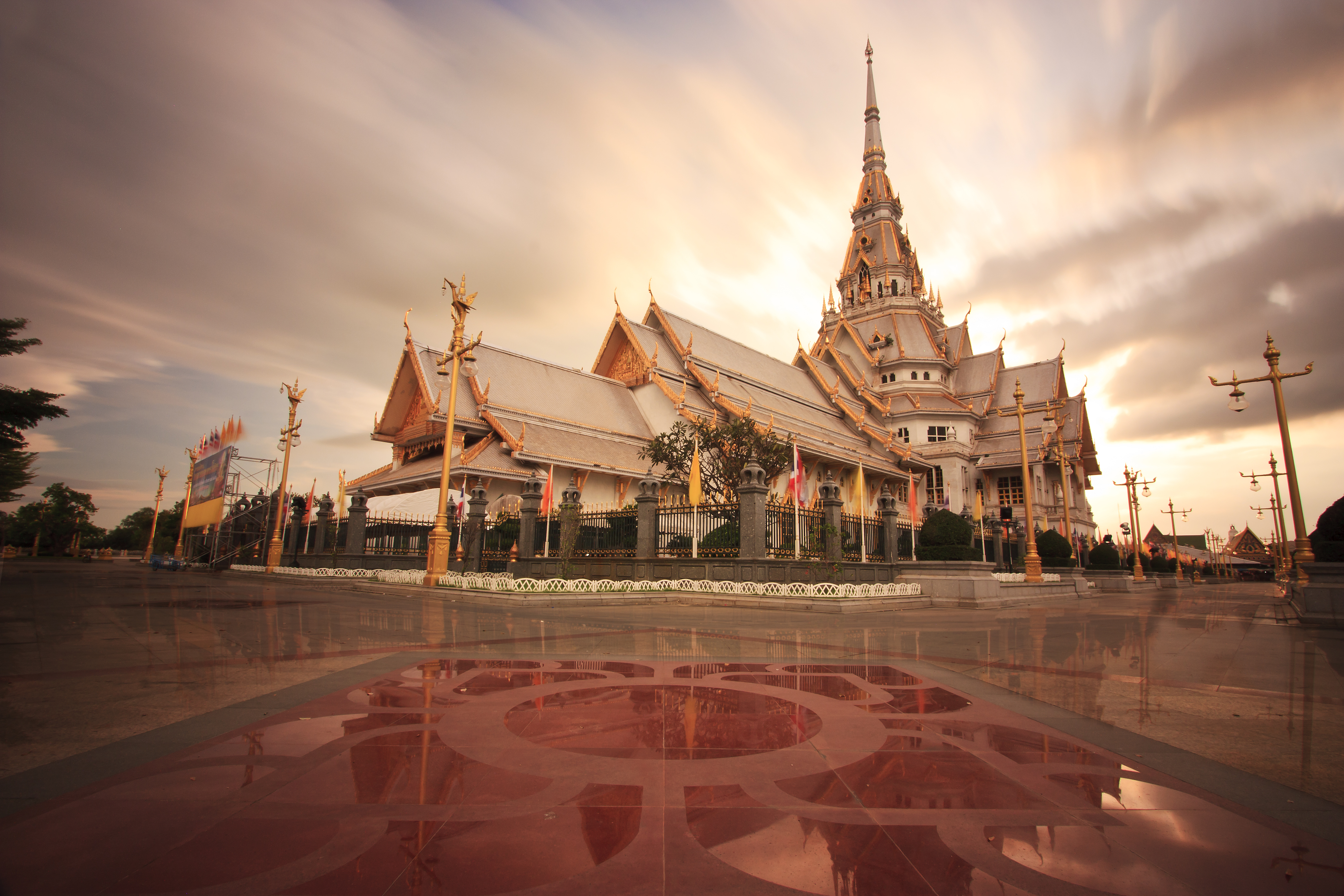
View of Wat Sothonwararam

Wat Sothonwararam is a temple in Chachoengsao Province, Thailand. Located in the Municipality of Mueang Chachoengsao alongside the Bang Pakong River, it was initially named ‘Wat Hong,’ and was built in the late Ayutthaya period.

The temple has the ‘Luangpho Phuttha Sothon,’ the revered Buddha image of Chachoengsao province, which is 1.48 metres high, with a lap width of 1.65 metres.

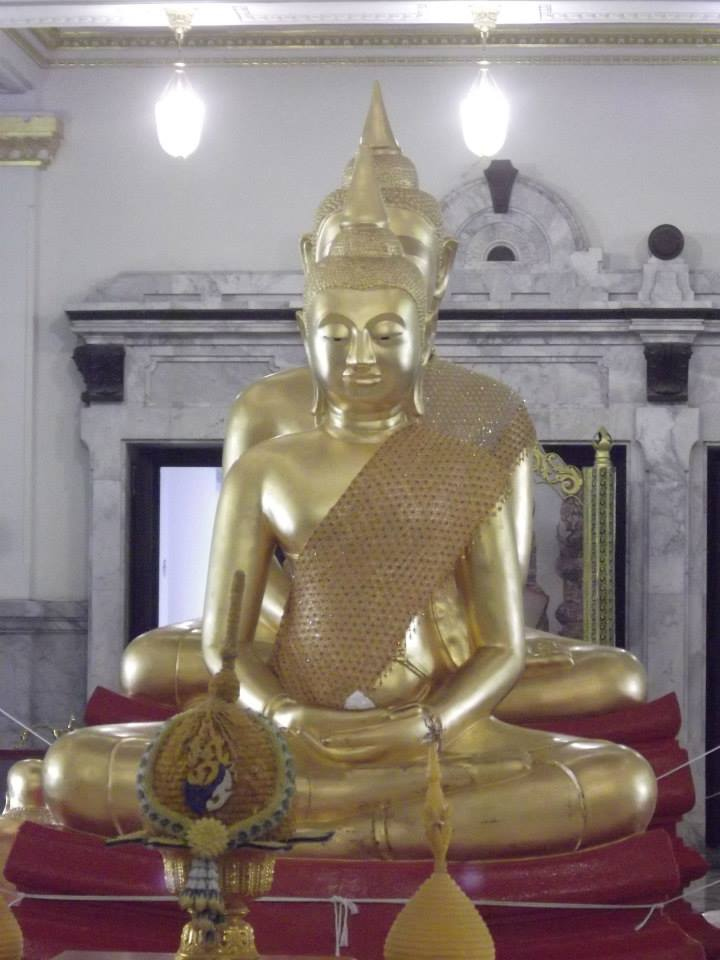
Luangpho Phuttha Sothon
