= Bagroides melapterus =

Conservation status
- Least Concern (IUCN 3.1)

Scientific classification
- Kingdom: Animalia
- Phylum: Chordata
- Class: Actinopterygii
- Division: Teleostei
- Order: Siluriformes
- Family: Bagridae
- Genus: Bagroides
- Species: B. melapterus

Binomial name
- Bagroides melapterus Bleeker, 1851

Synonyms
- Bagroides melanopterus Bleeker, 1852

Species of fish

Bagroides melapterus, the harlequin lancer catfish, is a type of catfish in the family Bagridae

== Appearance ==
The harlequin lancer catfishes max length is 34.0 cm

It is a slender build catfish that is a silver in color with black spots and markings

== Distribution ==
This catfish is found in Asia specifically Thailand, Malaysia, Brunei and Indonesia
