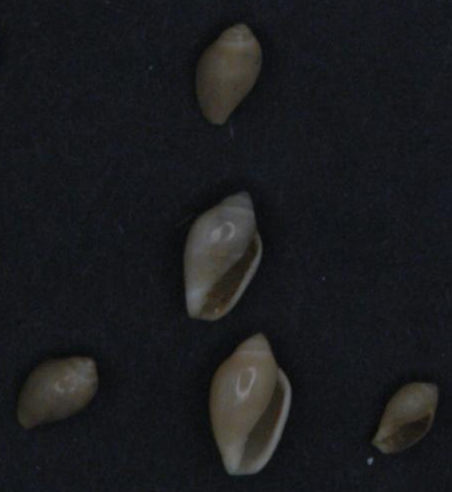
- Shells of Rivomarginella electrum

Scientific classification
- Kingdom: Animalia
- Phylum: Mollusca
- Class: Gastropoda
- Subclass: Caenogastropoda
- Order: Neogastropoda
- Family: Marginellidae
- Genus: Rivomarginella
- Species: R. electrum

Binomial name
- Rivomarginella electrum (Reeve, 1865)

Synonyms
- Marginella electrum Reeve, 1865

= Rivomarginella electrum =

Species of gastropod

Rivomarginella electrum is a species of freshwater snail, gastropod mollusk in the family Marginellidae, the margin snails.

== Distribution ==
It is native to Southeast Asia.
