= Khao Saming district =

Khao Saming เขาสมิง
- District
- District location in Trat province
- Coordinates: 12°21′12″N 102°26′6″E
- Country: Thailand
- Province: Trat

Area
  - Total: 679.2 km^{2} (262.2 sq mi)

Population (2000)
  - Total: 40,499
  - Density: 59.6/km^{2} (154/sq mi)
- Time zone: UTC+7 (ICT)
- Postal code: 23130
- Geocode: 2303

Khao Saming (Thai: เขาสมิง, pronounced [kʰǎw sā.mǐŋ]) is a district (amphoe) in Trat province, eastern Thailand.

== Toponymy ==
Khao Saming takes its name from a small mountain located approximately 3 kilometres (1.9 mi) from the district center. According to local legend, the mountain was once the home of a man who possessed powerful magical abilities and could transform himself into a tiger. The villagers called him a "Suea Saming". Because the man was said to be virtuous and did not eat meat, even when he transformed into a Suea Saming, he remained a creature that did not eat meat. The Suea Saming lived alone in the mountain. He regularly used a large vine known as the Saba vine as a bridge, swinging from the mountaintop across the Trat river to a large tree on the opposite bank. Today, only a large rubber tree is said to remain as evidence of this former crossing.

Later, a group of Chinese settlers traveled to the area to cut timber for the construction of a large junk. They came from Ban Si Bua Thong in Wang Takhian subdistrict, which lies beyond the mountain. The Chinese group spent several months cutting timber and building the junk in the forest along the Trat river. When the large vessel was finally completed, they worked together to drag it down to the Trat river so that they could sail it back home. As they sailed down the Trat river, they reached the area around the large Saba vine that the Suea Saming had regularly used to cross the river. Unfortunately, the vessel's mast became entangled in the vine, preventing the junk from continuing downstream.

The junk's captain therefore ordered his men to climb up and cut the vine away from the river so that the vessel could pass. As a result, when the Suea Saming returned, he could no longer cross the river to the opposite bank. Using his supernatural powers, the Suea Saming discovered who had cut the vine and pursued them. He found the Chinese junk sailing down the Trat river toward Ban Prong. When the vessel reached Ban Prong, the Chinese sailors' junk suddenly capsized, causing everyone aboard to drown.

Since then, people have called this small mountain "Khao Saming" (Saming Mountain). According to the legend, the remains of the Chinese junk can still supposedly be seen in the Trat river in the area of Ban Prong to this day.

== History ==
The district was established in 1898, but its name and the location of the district office has changed several times in its history. At first named Si Bua Thong, then Thung Yai, it was finally renamed Khao Saming when the district office was moved to Ban Tha Kathon in Tambon Khao Saming. The present district office building was opened on 14 February 2000.

== Geography ==
Neighboring districts are (from the north clockwise) Khlung of Chanthaburi province, Bo Rai, Mueang Trat, Laem Ngop of Trat Province.

== Administration ==
The district is divided into eight sub-districts (tambons), which are further subdivided into 66 villages (mubans). Two townships (thesaban tambon) are in the district: Saen Tung covers parts of the tambon Saen Tung, and Khao Saming covers parts of the tambon Khao Saming and Thung Nonsi. There are eight further tambon administrative organizations (TAO).

1.	Khao Saming	เขาสมิง
2.	Saen Tung	แสนตุ้ง
3.	Wang Takhian	วังตะเคียน
4.	Tha Som	ท่าโสม
5.	Sato	สะตอ
6.	Pranit	ประณีต
7.	Thep Nimit	เทพนิมิต
8.	Thung Nonsi	ทุ่งนนทรี
