= Bagrus filamentosus =

Conservation status
- Data Deficient (IUCN 3.1)

Scientific classification
- Kingdom: Animalia
- Phylum: Chordata
- Class: Actinopterygii
- Order: Siluriformes
- Family: Bagridae
- Genus: Bagrus
- Species: B. filamentosus

Binomial name
- Bagrus filamentosus Pellegrin, 1924

Species of fish

Bagrus filamentosus is a species of fish in the family Bagridae. It is found in Guinea, Mali, Niger and Nigeria. Its natural habitat is the River Niger. It is only certainly known by the type specimen.
