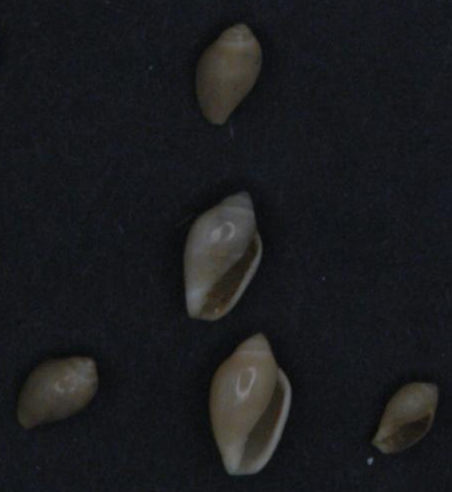
- Shells of Rivomarginella electrum

Scientific classification
- Kingdom: Animalia
- Phylum: Mollusca
- Class: Gastropoda
- Subclass: Caenogastropoda
- Order: Neogastropoda
- Family: Marginellidae
- Subfamily: Marginellinae
- Genus: Rivomarginella; Brandt, 1968

Type species
- Rivomarginella morrisoni Brandt, 1968

Diversity
- 2 freshwater species

= Rivomarginella =

Genus of gastropods

Rivomarginella is a genus of freshwater snails, gastropod mollusks in the family Marginellidae, the margin snails.

Rivomarginella is the only freshwater genus in the marine family Marginellidae.

== Distribution ==
They are native to Southeast Asia.

== Species ==
There are two species in the genus Rivomarginella:

- Rivomarginella electrum (Reeve, 1865)
- Rivomarginella morrisoni Brandt, 1968 - type species of the genus Rivomarginella

== Ecology ==
Predators of Rivomarginella snails include bagrid catfish false black lancer Bagrichthys macropterus.
