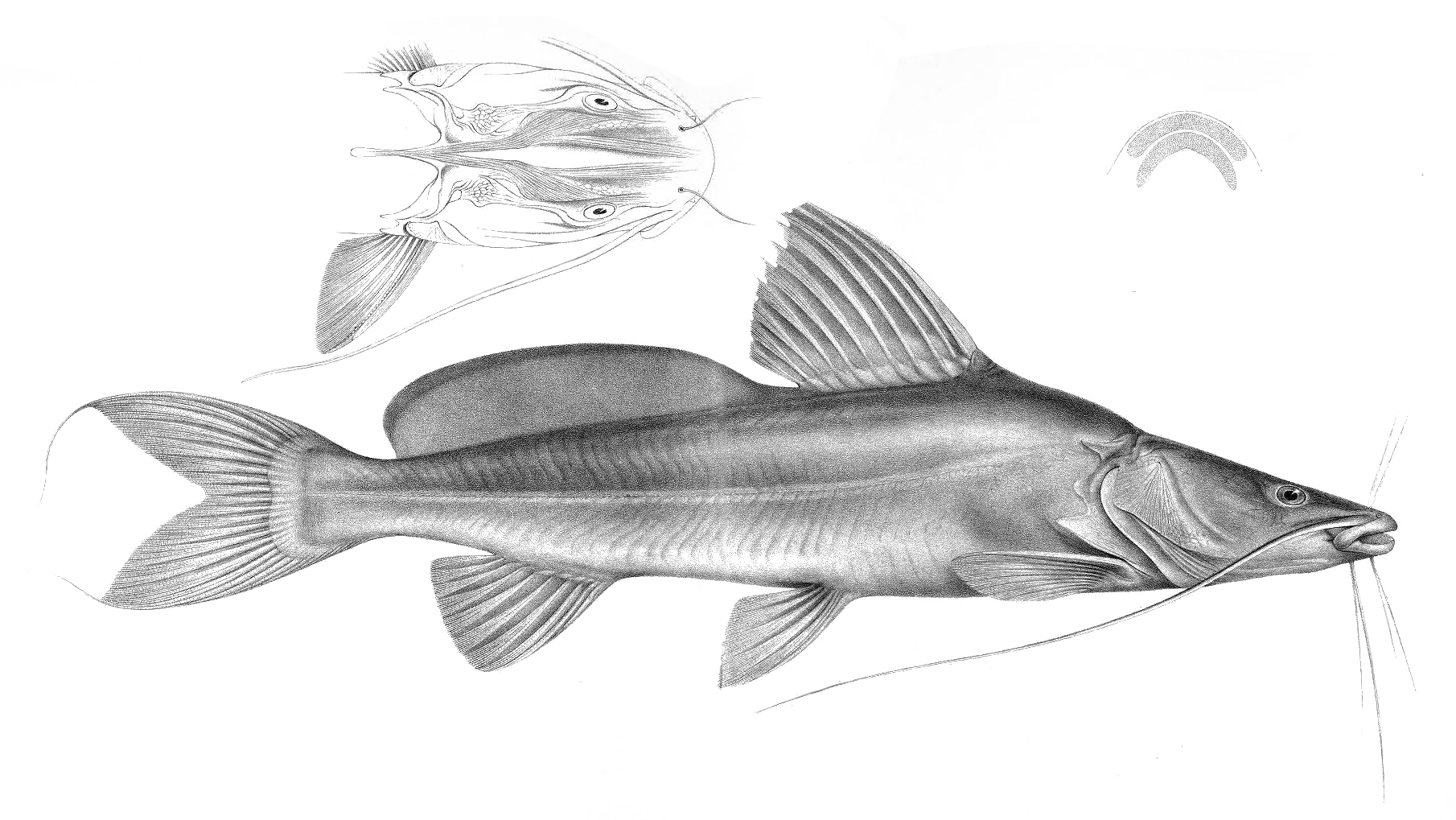

Conservation status
- Least Concern (IUCN 3.1)

Scientific classification
- Kingdom: Animalia
- Phylum: Chordata
- Class: Actinopterygii
- Order: Siluriformes
- Family: Bagridae
- Genus: Bagrus
- Species: B. bajad

Binomial name
- Bagrus bajad (Forsskål, 1775)

Synonyms
- Porcus bajad (Forsskål, 1775)

= Bayad =

Species of fish

The bayad (Bagrus bajad), is a species of bagrid catfish from Africa.

== Distribution ==
The natural habitat of the bayad are lakes and rivers in Africa. These include lakes such as Lake Chad, Lake Albert, and Lake Turkana, as well as rivers such as the Nile, the Niger, and the Senegal.

== Description ==
The bayad's body is generally elongated in shape. The dorsal fin has a smooth spine, and the pectoral fins have spines with serrations on the inside. There are four pairs of barbel anatomy barbels. The maxillary barbels usually reach to the ventral fin or pelvic fins. This fish is yellow-greenish or blackish with a white belly. The fins are darker, sometimes reddish purple. Juveniles have little black spots on the sides.

The bayad has a maximum size of about 112 centimetres (44.1 in) FL. It has a maximum published weight of 12.5 kilograms (27.5 lb), but is reputed to reach 100 kg (220 lb). Mean sizes and weight of males are less than those of females from the same age. Males grow up to 7 years old, females 8 years (Ref. 51644).

== Ecology ==
The bayad is found in lakes, swamps and rivers. It avoids salt water. This species spends nearly the whole of the daylight hours in crevices of rocks and is therefore seldom seen. It lives and feeds on or near the bottom. Adults are exclusively piscivorous; it preys on small fish, particularly Alestes species, or Chrysichthys auratus as in Lake Kainji. These fish also feed on insects, crustaceans, mollusks, and vegetable matter. The efficiency of catching prey catfish is maximised by face to face attack, avoiding damage by dorsal and pectoral spines of the prey.

There is some indication that the species comes to shallower water to breed. Spawning season extends from April to July. The parents build and guard the nest, which is like a flat disc with a central hole where the eggs are dropped; the size of the nest and the central hole depend on the fish size.

== Relationship to humans ==
The bayad is an important food fish. The bayad flesh is good eating and is of economic importance, commonly sold as food.
