= Somalia catfish =

Conservation status
- Data Deficient (IUCN 3.1)

Scientific classification
- Kingdom: Animalia
- Phylum: Chordata
- Class: Actinopterygii
- Order: Siluriformes
- Family: Bagridae
- Genus: Bagrus
- Species: B. urostigma

Binomial name
- Bagrus urostigma Vinciguerra, 1895

Synonyms
- Porcus urostigma (Vinciguerra, 1895)

Species of fish

The Somalia catfish (Bagrus urostigma) is a species of catfish (order Siluriformes) in the family Bagridae. The Somalia catfish is native to the Jubba River in Somalia.

This species has four pairs of barbels. The maxillary barbels reach to the middle of the adipose fin in juveniles and to the middle of the dorsal fin in the adult. The caudal fin is forked, with the upper lobe longer than the lower. The pectoral fin spine is very strong, prominent, and strongly serrated on the inner side. The fish is reddish brown above, yellowish white beneath, and the caudal fin dotted with black. This species grows to 72.0 centimetres TL.
