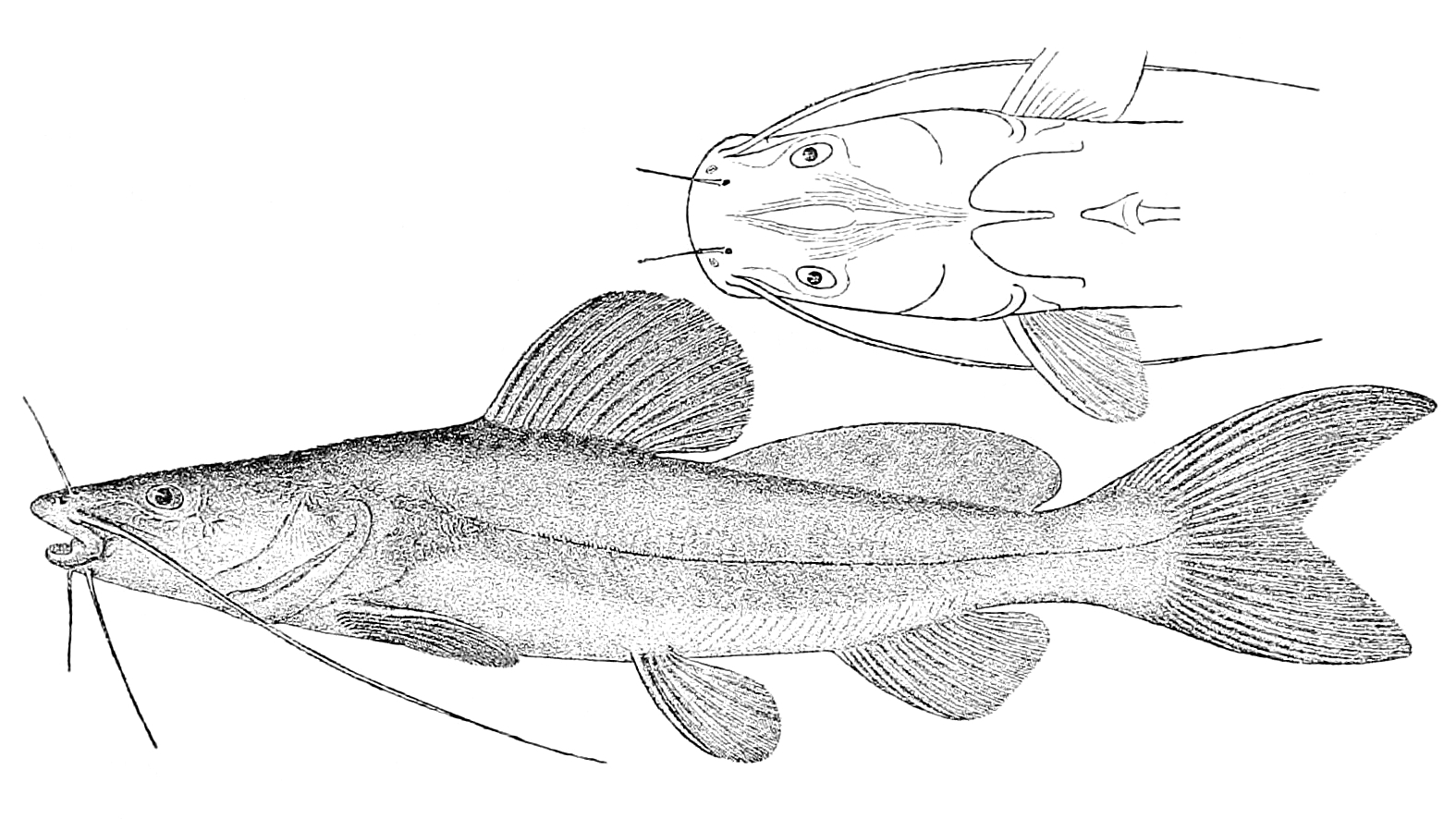

Conservation status
- Least Concern (IUCN 3.1)

Scientific classification
- Kingdom: Animalia
- Phylum: Chordata
- Class: Actinopterygii
- Order: Siluriformes
- Family: Bagridae
- Genus: Bagrus
- Species: B. orientalis

Binomial name
- Bagrus orientalis Boulenger, 1902

= Bagrus orientalis =

Species of fish

Bagrus orientalis is a species of fish in the family Bagridae. It is found in Malawi and Tanzania. Its natural habitat is freshwater lakes.
