= Bagrichthys macropterus =

Conservation status
- Least Concern (IUCN 3.1)

Scientific classification
- Kingdom: Animalia
- Phylum: Chordata
- Class: Actinopterygii
- Division: Teleostei
- Order: Siluriformes
- Family: Bagridae
- Genus: Bagrichthys
- Species: B. macropterus

Binomial name
- Bagrichthys macropterus (Bleeker, 1854)

Synonyms
- Bagroides macropterus Bleeker, 1854

Species of bagrid catfish

Bagrichthys macropterus, the false black lancer, is a species of freshwater ray-finned fish belonging to the family Bagridae, the naked catfishes. This catfish is found in southeast Asia where it is found in Indonesia.

== Taxonomy ==
Bagrichthys macropterus was first formally described as Bagroides macropterus in 1854 by the Dutch physician and ichthyologist Pieter Bleeker with its type locality given as Muara Kumpeh in Jambi, Sumatra. This species is now classified in the genus Bagrichthys which had been described by Bleeker in 1857, with B. hypselopterus as its type species. The genus Bagrichthys is classified in the family Bagridae, the bagrid or naked catfishes, which is classified in the suborder Siluroidei of the catfish order Siluriformes.

== Etymology ==
Bagrichthys macropterus belongs to the genus Bagrichthys, a name which suffixes ichthys, meaning "fish", onto Bagrus, the genus the type species, B. hypselopterus was originally placed in. The specific name, macropterus combines macro, meaning "long" or "large", with pterus, meaning "fin" an allusion to the long adipose fin, this fin is quadruple the length of the dorsal fin.

== Description ==
Bagrichthys macropterus has an elongated body and reaches a standard length of 36 cm (14 in). The dorsal fin has a single short spine and 8 soft rays while the anal fin contains 14 soft rays. This species has a small, round mouth. The body has clear pale markings on a dark background colour.

== Distribution and habitat ==
Bagrichthys macropterus is endemic to Indonesia where it occurs on Sumatra and in Kalimantan. In Sumatra it is found in the Batang Hari and Musi river systems; while in Kalimantan it is known from the Kapuas, Kayan and Barito drainages. This catfish is found in large rivers with turbid water.

== Utilisation ==
Bagrichthys macropterus is caught for food by subsistence fishers.
