= Phra Prong River =

- Native name: แม่น้ำพระปรง (Thai)

Location
- Country: Thailand

Physical characteristics
- Source
  - location: Phra Prong Reservoir, Sa Kaeo Province
- Mouth
  - location: Bang Pakong River
- Length: 132 km (82 mi)

Basin features
- River system: Bang Pakong

The Phra Prong River (Thai: แม่น้ำพระปรง, RTGS: Maenam Phra Prong, pronounced [mɛ̂ː.náːm pʰráʔ prōŋ]) or Khlong Phra Prong (คลองพระปรง) is a river in Thailand.

== Geography ==
The Phra Prong originates in the Sankamphaeng Range, a mountainous area between the districts Watthana Nakhon of Sa Kaeo, Lahan Sai of Buriram and Khon Buri of Nakhon Ratchasima.

It flows southwestward and joins the Hanuman River to become the Bang Pakong River in Kabin Buri District, Prachinburi Province. The river is 132 kilometres (82 mi) long.
