= Bo Rai district =

Bo Rai บ่อไร่
- District
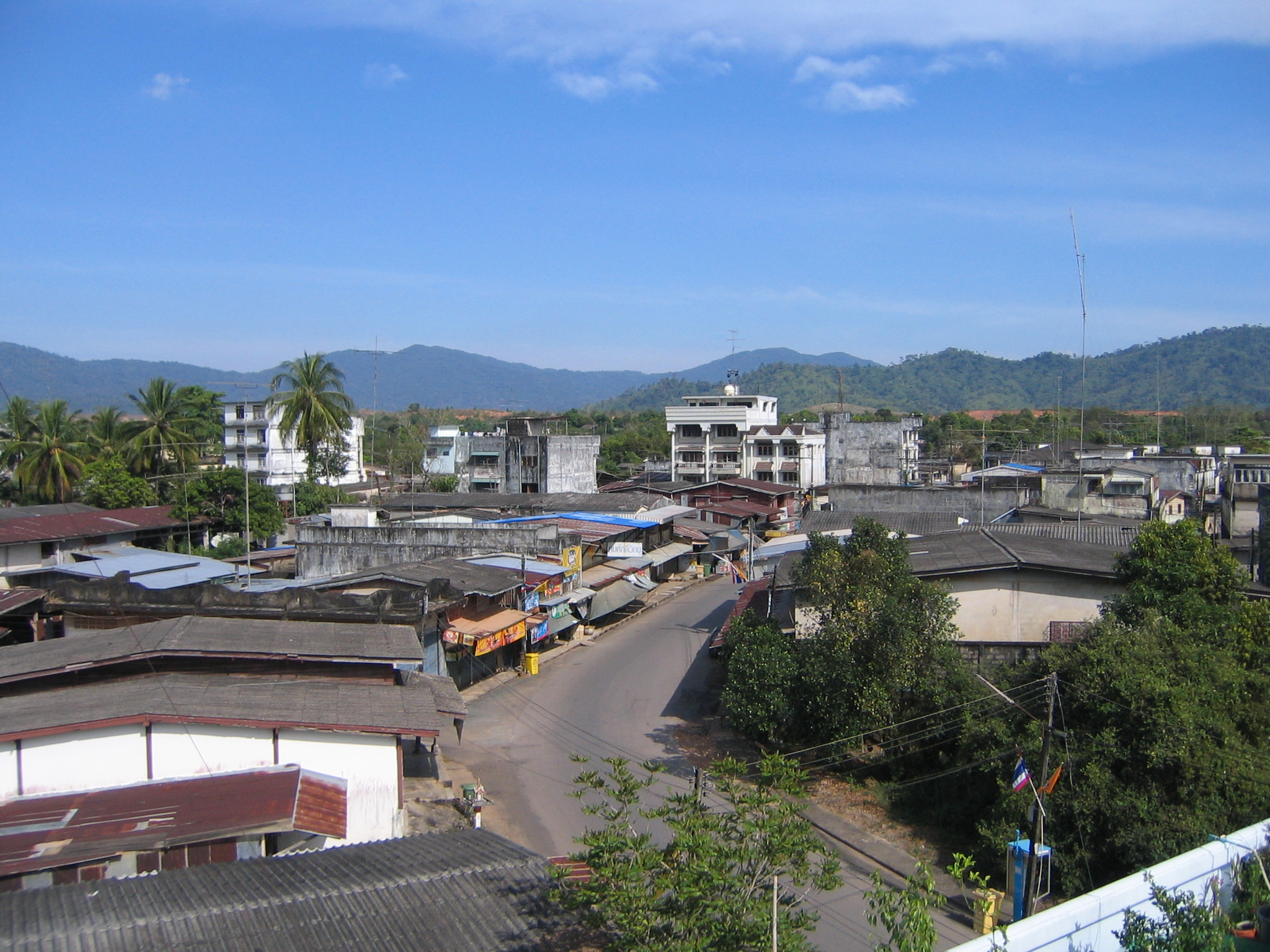

- District location in Trat province
- Coordinates: 12°34′47″N 102°31′30″E
- Country: Thailand
- Province: Trat
- Seat: Bo Phloi

Area
  - Total: 680.0 km^{2} (262.5 sq mi)

Population (2000)
  - Total: 39,736
  - Density: 58.4/km^{2} (151/sq mi)
- Time zone: UTC+7 (ICT)
- Postal code: 23140
- Geocode: 2304

Bo Rai (Thai: บ่อไร่, pronounced [bɔ̀ː râj]) is a township and district (amphoe) in Trat province, eastern Thailand, near the Khao Banthat Mountain Range in Cambodia.

== History ==
The area was known for gemstone mining (rubies and sapphires) and gem trade which made Bo Rai prosper and grow. From the 1960s until the beginning of the 1990s the town experienced an economic boom, which ended almost overnight with the exhaustion of the mines through plundering. The economic depression that followed was further increased by the downfall of the Khmer Rouge and the subsequent end of the border trafficking of goods and gems.

Once the centre of Thailand's gem trade, Bo Rai is now a shadow of its former glory, yet some hope is seen in the migrating refugees coming from the south. There have been attempts at economic conversion, such as the cultivation of rubber trees. There are rumours of a new Thai-Cambodian border crossing being opened at Ban Mamuang.

The area is battling drug resistant malaria that has crept over from Cambodia.

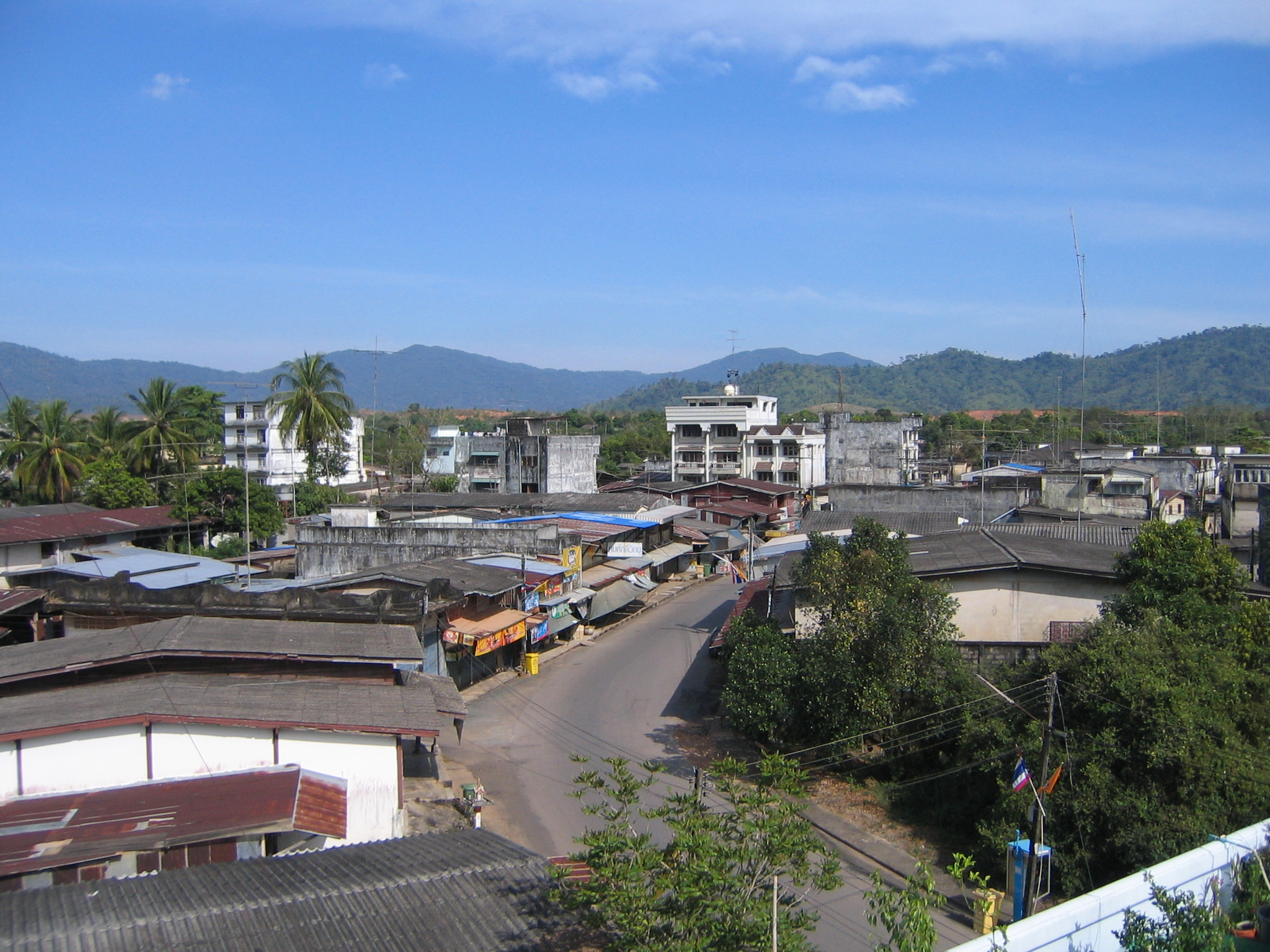
Bo Rai District. In the background, the Cambodian Khao Banthat Mountains

== Geography ==
Neighboring districts are Mueang Trat and Khao Saming to the south, Khlung of Chanthaburi province to the west, Pong Nam Ron of Chanthaburi to the north, and Battambang province of Cambodia to the north and east.

Namtok Khlong Kaeo National Park is in this district.

== Administration ==
Bo Rai is divided into five sub-districts (tambons), which are further subdivided into 34 villages (mubans). The central town is Bo Phloi, which has township status (thesaban tambon) and covers parts of the same-named tambon. As of 2005, the population of the township is 10,009. Each of the tambons is administered by a tambon administrative organization (TAO).

No.	Name	Thai name	Villages	Pop.
1.	Bo Phloi	บ่อพลอย	10	15,787
2.	Chang Thun	ช้างทูน	6	2,876
3.	Dan Chumphon	ด่านชุมพล	7	4,626
4.	Nong Bon	หนองบอน	6	8,718
5.	Nonsi	นนทรีย์	5	3,652

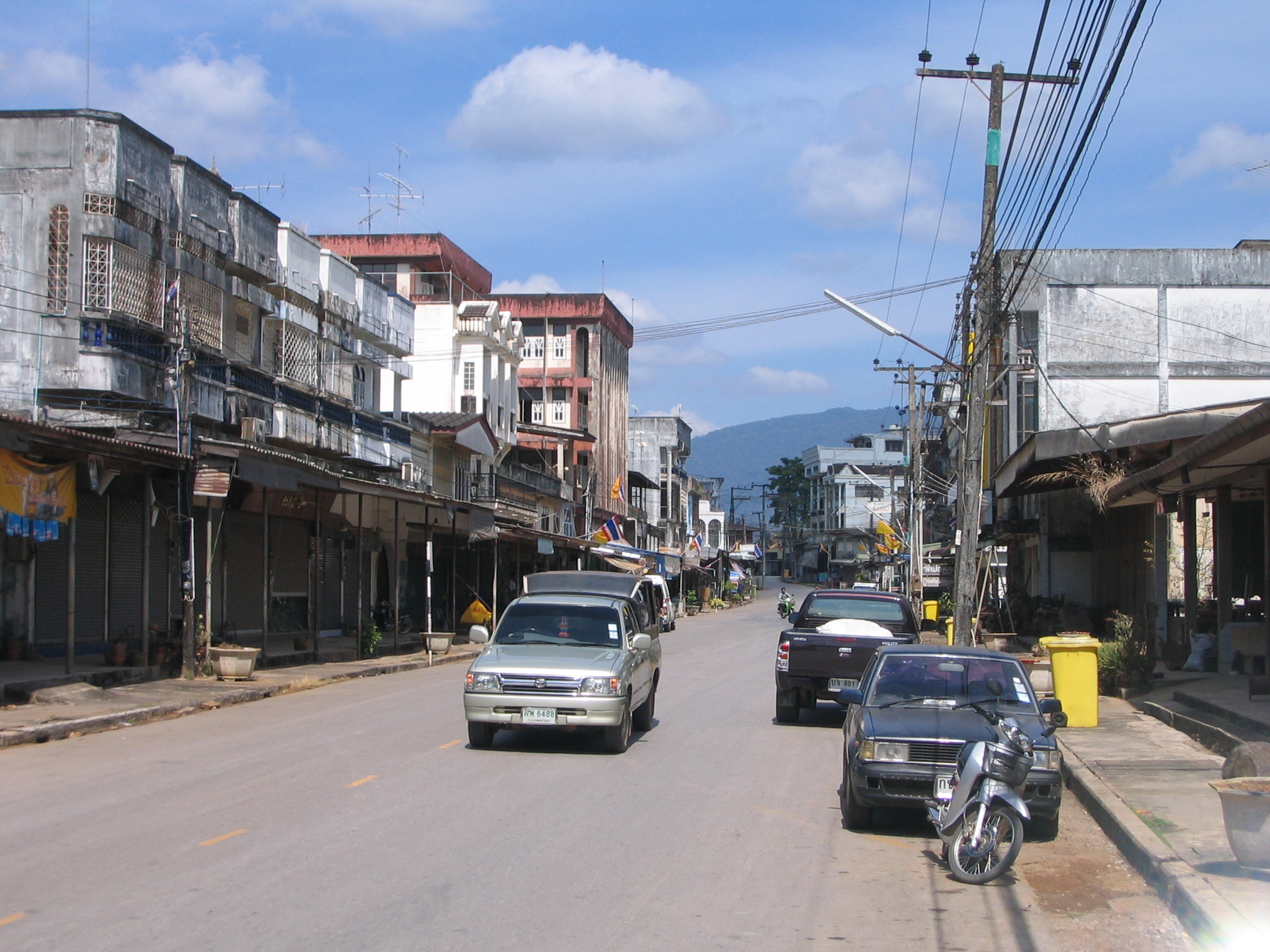
Once a virtual ghost town, life is coming back to Bo Rai. A view of the main street.

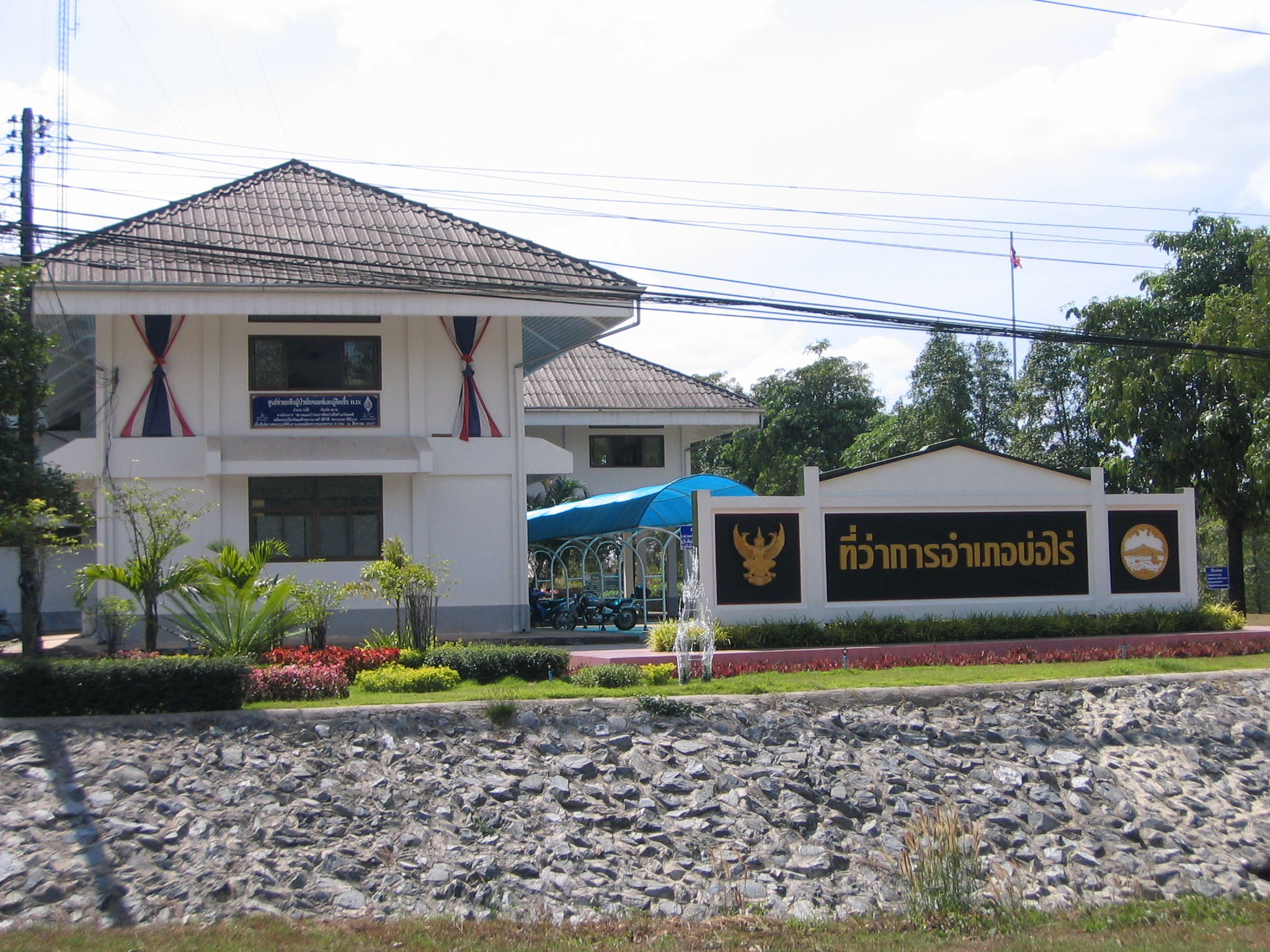
Bo Rai District Office
