= Tha Taphao River =

Stream in Chumphon, Thailand

Coordinates: 10.44407°N 99.24748°E

Tha Taphao River, known in Thai as Khlong Tha Taphao (Thai: คลองท่าตะเภา, pronounced [kʰlɔ̄ːŋ tʰâː ta.pʰāw]), is a natural waterway in Chumphon province, southern Thailand.

Its source is from three streams confluence in the Tenasserim Range, forming the border between Thailand and Myanmar, as well as two other provinces of Thailand are Prachuap Khiri Khan and Chumphon. The river flows through Tha Sae into Mueang Chumphon districts and empties into the Gulf of Thailand at Ao Chumphon, where it is referred to as Pak Nam Chumphon, total length 33 km (20.5 mi). When the sea level rises and the fresh water in the river mixes with it, it becomes salty water, brackish water, and fresh water, making it suitable for raising barramundi. The area at the end of the river is a pier for many fishing boats.

Tha Taphao river has historical significance what with in the past, when Chumphon was still an important seaport, the river was considered a shipping route. Hence, it was named Tha Taphao which means "junk ship pier". This name also became the name of the former Mueang Chumphon district. In addition, as it flows through Khao Sam Kaeo, there are also many archaeological evidences of ancient sites, such as the bronze drums and beads, as it was a prehistoric human settlement. Currently, the course is used as a flood retention basin to prevent inundation in Chumphon and as a water tourism route.
