= Mueang Trat district =

Mueang Trat เมืองตราด
- District
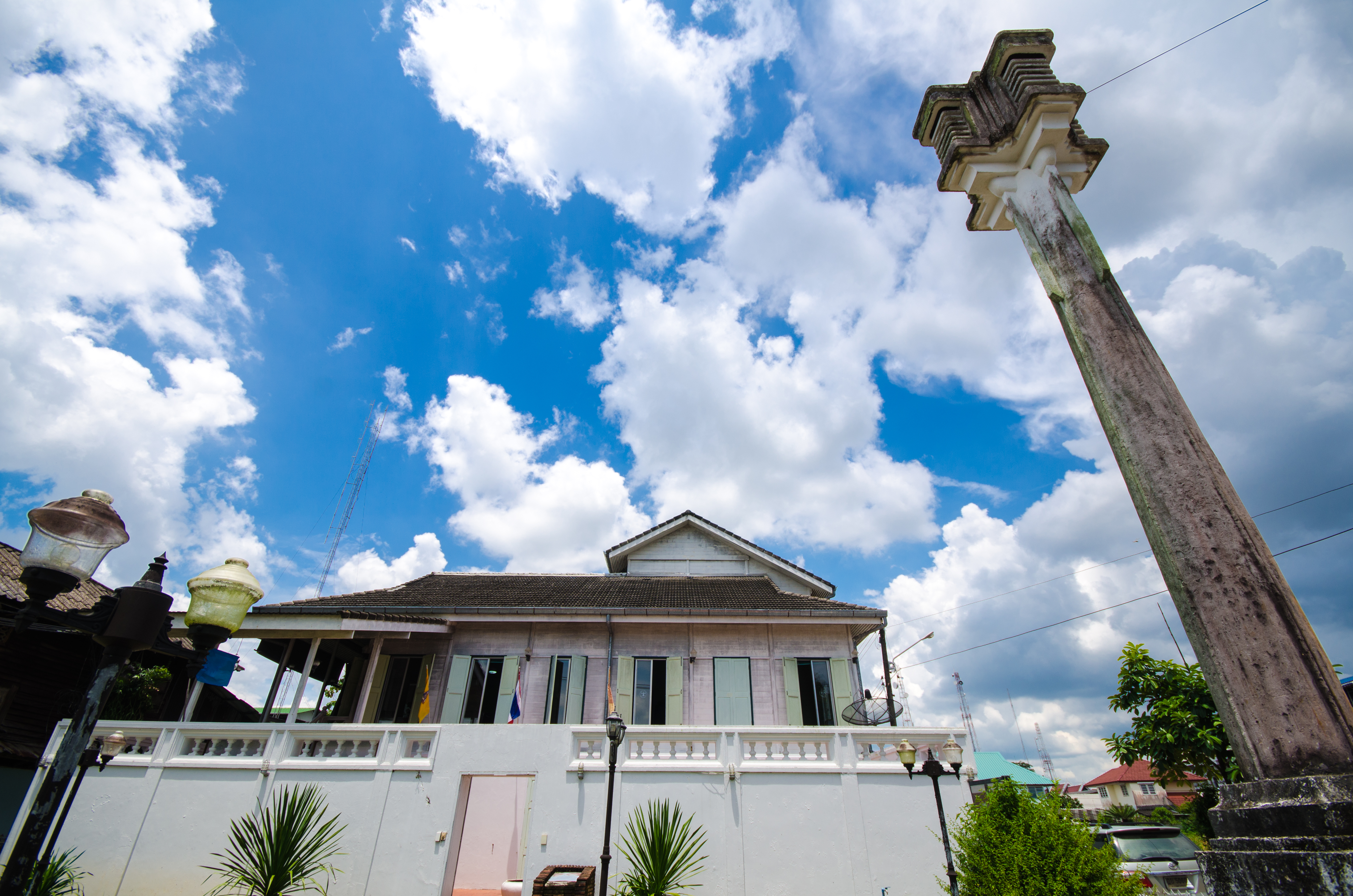
- Residanggamport Residence

- District location in Trat province
- Coordinates: 12°13′54″N 102°30′48″E
- Country: Thailand
- Province: Trat
- Seat: Nong Samet

Area
  - Total: 938.611 km^{2} (362.400 sq mi)

Population (2000)
  - Total: 89,661
  - Density: 95.5/km^{2} (247/sq mi)
- Time zone: UTC+7 (ICT)
- Postal code: 23000
- Geocode: 2301

Mueang Trat (Thai: เมืองตราด, pronounced [mɯ̄a̯ŋ tràːt]) is the capital district (amphoe mueang) of Trat province, eastern Thailand.

== History ==
The area was settled in 1901 as a khwaeng of Mueang Trat. The government upgraded the khwaeng to Mueang Trat District in 1908. In 1921 the district was renamed Bang Phra after the central tambon (sub-district). The district's name was changed to Mueang Trat in 1938 due to a new naming policy for capital districts.

== Geography ==
Neighboring districts are (from the west clockwise): Laem Ngop, Khao Saming, and Bo Rai of Trat Province; Pursat and Koh Kong Provinces of Cambodia; Khlong Yai of Trat Province; and the Gulf of Thailand.

The district has one border crossing into Cambodia, at Ban Tha Sen. It is a "temporary" crossing, open only several days a week. As of 2019 there are plans to construct a permanent border crossing here.

== Administration ==
The district is divided into 14 sub-districts (tambons), which are further subdivided into 97 villages (mubans). Trat itself has town (thesaban mueang) status and covers the tambon Bang Phra and part of Wang Krachae. The township (thesaban tambon) Tha Phrik Noen Sai covers the complete tambon Tha Phrik and parts of Noen Sai. There are a further 12 tambon administrative organizations (TAO).

| 1. | Bang Phra | บางพระ |
| 2. | Nong Samet | หนองเสม็ด |
| 3. | Nong Sano | หนองโสน |
| 4. | Nong Khan Song | หนองคันทรง |
| 5. | Huang Nam Khao | ห้วงน้ำขาว |
| 6. | Ao Yai | อ่าวใหญ่ |
| 7. | Wang Krachae | วังกระแจะ |
| 8. | Huai Raeng | ห้วยแร้ง |
| 9. | Noen Sai | เนินทราย |
| 10. | Tha Phrik | ท่าพริก |
| 11. | Tha Kum | ท่ากุ่ม |
| 12. | Takang | ตะกาง |
| 13. | Chamrak | ชำราก |
| 14. | Laem Klat | แหลมกลัด |
