= Bagroides =

Scientific classification
- Domain: Eukaryota
- Kingdom: Animalia
- Phylum: Chordata
- Class: Actinopterygii
- Order: Siluriformes
- Family: Bagridae
- Genus: Bagroides; Bleeker, 1851

Type species
- Bagroides melapterus Bleeker, 1851

Genus of fishes

Bagroides is a genus of bagrid catfishes found in eastern Asia.

== Species ==
- Bagroides hirsutus (Herre, 1934)
- Bagroides melapterus Bleeker, 1851
