= Trat =

Trat ตราด
- Town
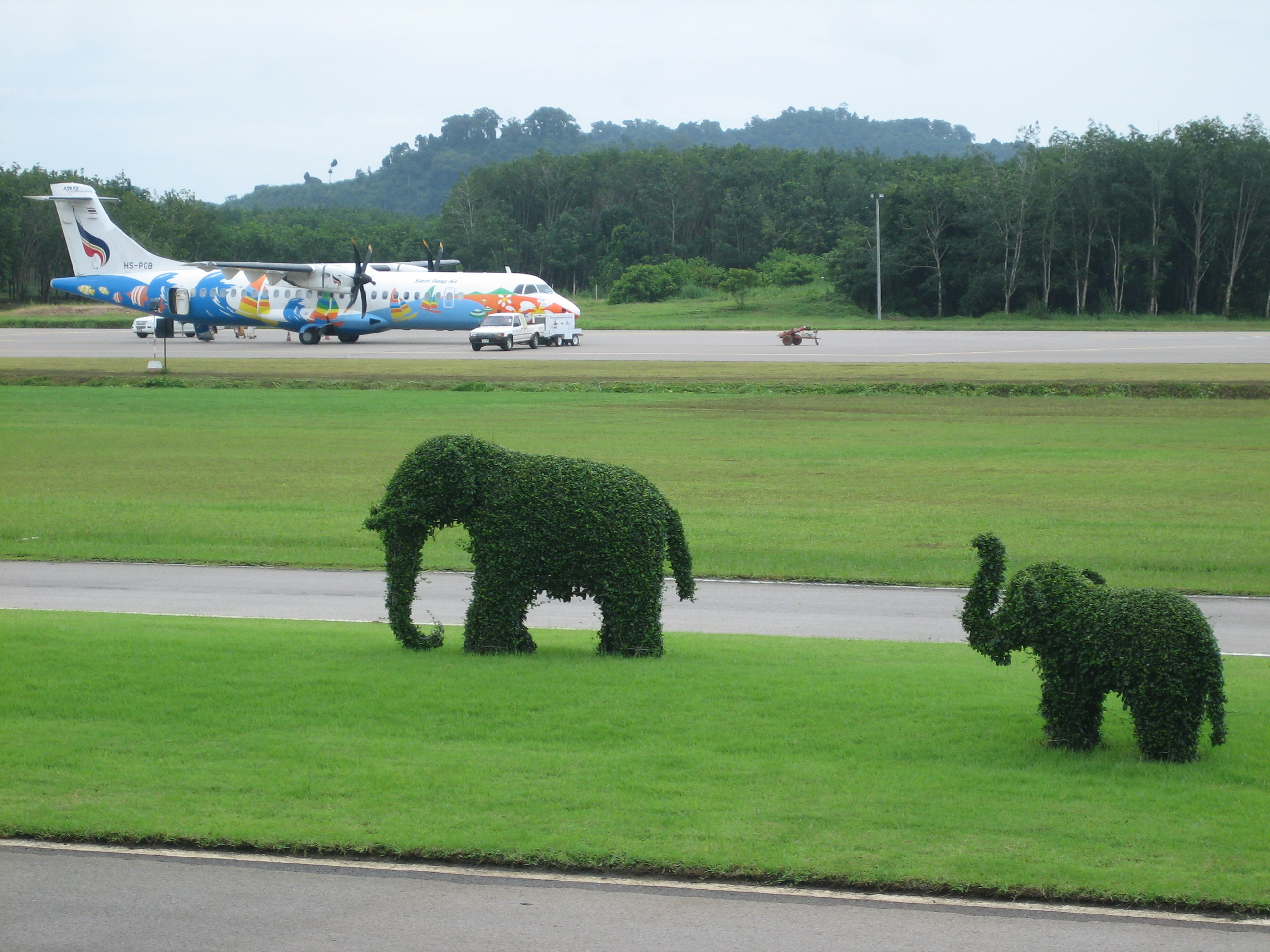
- Trat Airport

- Location within Thailand
- Coordinates: 12°14′30″N 102°30′45″E
- Country: Thailand
- Province: Trat province
- District: Mueang Trat district
- Time zone: UTC+7 (ICT)
- Calling code: (+66) 39

Trat (Thai: ตราด, pronounced [tràːt]), also spelt Trad, is a town in Thailand, capital of Trat province and the Mueang Trat district. The town is in the east of Thailand, at the mouth of the Trat River, near the border with Cambodia.

== Etymology ==
Trat is believed to derive from Krat (กราด), the Thai name for the tree Dipterocarpus intricatus, common to the region and used to make brooms. It is also spelt Trad.

== History ==
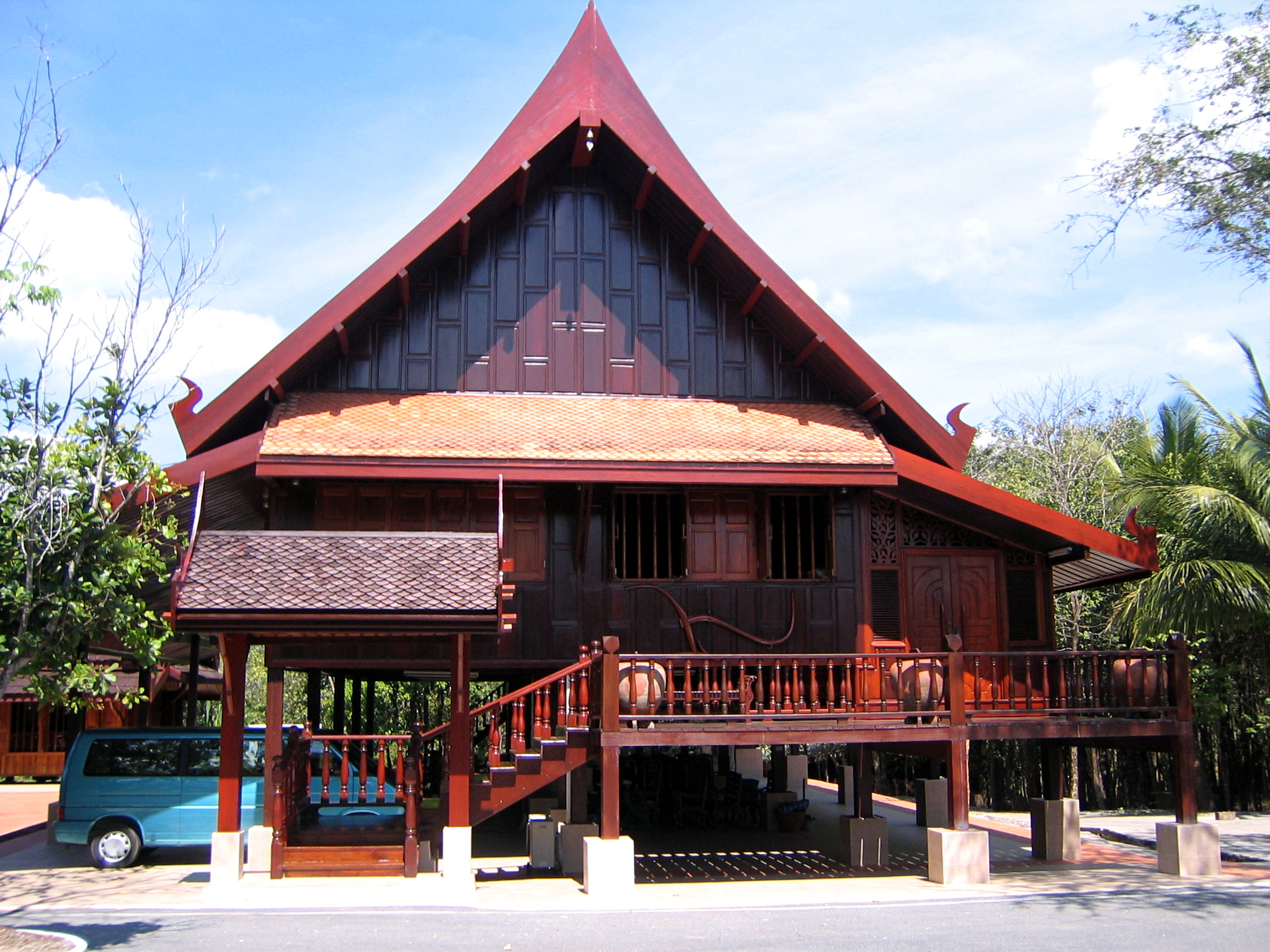
A traditional wooden Thai house built on stilts in Amphoe Bo Rai, Trat Province, Thailand.

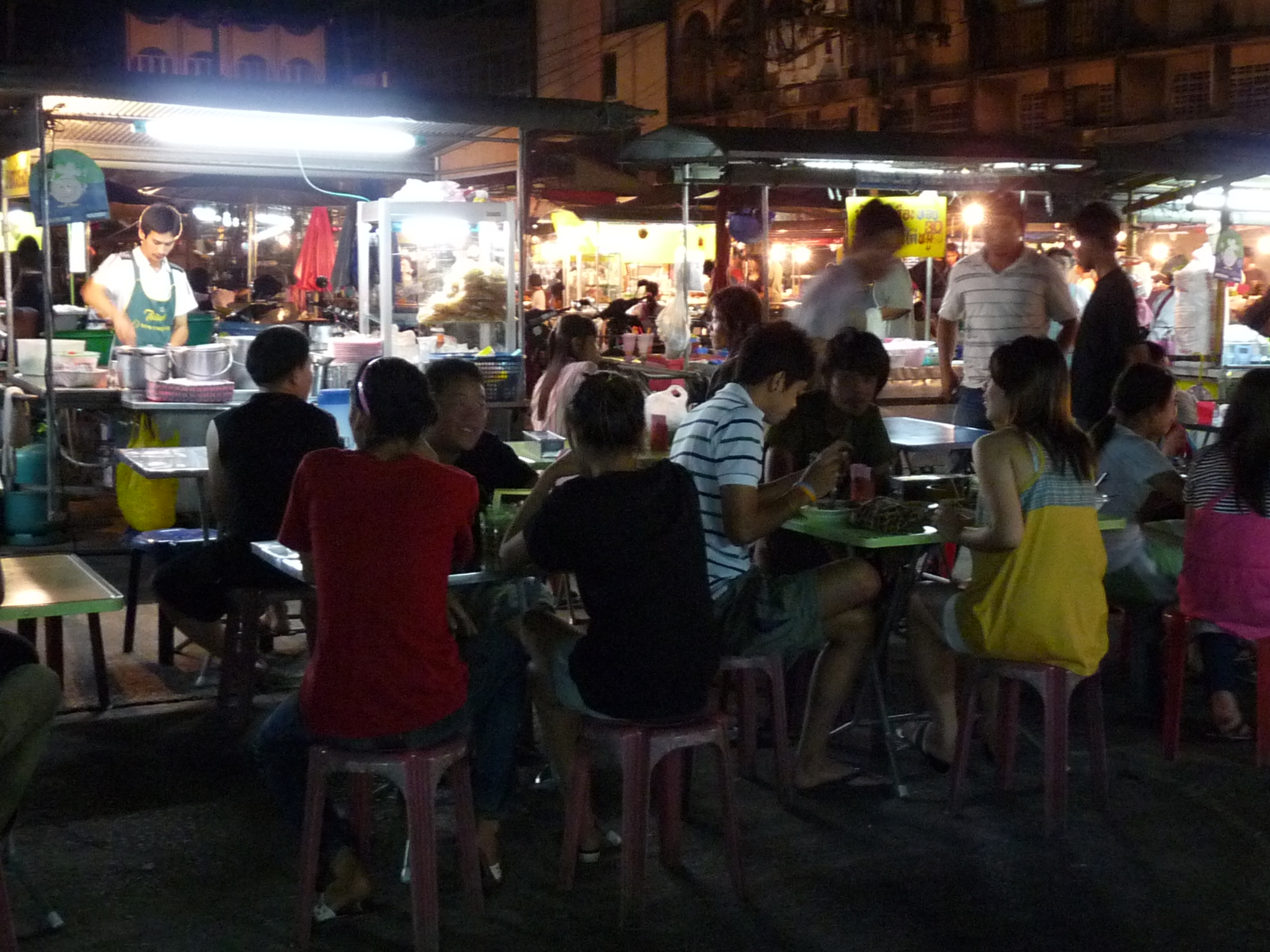
Night market in Trat, Thailand.

Trat was already an important seaport in the Kingdom of Ayutthaya.

Under King Chulalongkorn (Rama V), Trat and Chanthaburi provinces were briefly occupied by the French. In a complicated exchange of territory, Trat (and Chanthaburi) was returned on March 23, 1906, but Thailand relinquished the area around Siem Reap and Sisophon in present-day Cambodia.

When the Vietnamese pushed the Khmer Rouge out of Cambodia in 1985, Pol Pot fled to Thailand and made his headquarters in a plantation villa near Trat. It was built for him by the Thai Army and nicknamed "Office 87".

== Geography ==
Trat Province is located in the eastern part of the central region of Thailand, in the extreme southeast of Thailand near the border with Cambodia. It is just over 300 km from the capital Bangkok.

=== Climate ===
Trat experiences a tropical monsoon climate, with the dry season taking place from November to April and the wet season lasting from May to October.

Climate data for Trat (1991-2020, extremes 1961-present)
Month	Jan	Feb	Mar	Apr	May	Jun	Jul	Aug	Sep	Oct	Nov	Dec	Year
Record high °C (°F)	36.1 (97.0)	35.7 (96.3)	38.2 (100.8)	35.7 (96.3)	36.1 (97.0)	34.5 (94.1)	34.2 (93.6)	34.2 (93.6)	34.2 (93.6)	35.9 (96.6)	36.1 (97.0)	35.8 (96.4)	38.2 (100.8)
Mean daily maximum °C (°F)	31.9 (89.4)	32.0 (89.6)	32.6 (90.7)	33.3 (91.9)	32.8 (91.0)	31.5 (88.7)	30.7 (87.3)	30.7 (87.3)	30.9 (87.6)	31.8 (89.2)	32.6 (90.7)	32.2 (90.0)	31.9 (89.4)
Daily mean °C (°F)	26.8 (80.2)	27.3 (81.1)	28.1 (82.6)	28.6 (83.5)	28.4 (83.1)	27.5 (81.5)	27.1 (80.8)	27.2 (81.0)	27.0 (80.6)	27.0 (80.6)	27.7 (81.9)	27.1 (80.8)	27.5 (81.5)
Mean daily minimum °C (°F)	22.2 (72.0)	22.9 (73.2)	24.2 (75.6)	24.7 (76.5)	24.8 (76.6)	24.3 (75.7)	24.0 (75.2)	24.1 (75.4)	23.8 (74.8)	23.6 (74.5)	23.5 (74.3)	22.6 (72.7)	23.7 (74.7)
Record low °C (°F)	13.0 (55.4)	15.0 (59.0)	15.9 (60.6)	19.5 (67.1)	21.0 (69.8)	21.0 (69.8)	19.9 (67.8)	20.0 (68.0)	19.5 (67.1)	18.5 (65.3)	15.7 (60.3)	13.0 (55.4)	13.0 (55.4)
Average precipitation mm (inches)	51.1 (2.01)	81.5 (3.21)	140.0 (5.51)	196.0 (7.72)	419.9 (16.53)	777.2 (30.60)	1,024.1 (40.32)	969.7 (38.18)	816.4 (32.14)	337.6 (13.29)	85.2 (3.35)	27.8 (1.09)	4,926.5 (193.96)
Average precipitation days (≥ 1 mm)	3.5	5.6	9.6	11.7	18.8	23.3	24.6	24.6	22.5	17.4	6.8	2.4	170.8
Average relative humidity (%)	73.0	76.8	79.3	80.3	83.1	86.5	87.3	87.6	87.2	84.5	75.3	69.8	80.9
Source: NOAA

== Economy ==
Its proximity to the Cambodian border gives Trat importance as a trading city. The area around Trat is rich in gemstone mines, whose yield (rubies and sapphires) is processed right in the town. Fruit growing is also important: durian, rambutan and mangosteen are the main products.

For tourists, Trat is more interesting as a starting point to the large islands of Ko Chang and Ko Mak.

The city of Trat had 10,207 inhabitants as of 2012.
