= Hanuman River =

River in Thailand

The Hanuman River (Thai: แม่น้ำหนุมาน, RTGS: Maenam Hanuman, pronounced [mɛ̂ː.náːm hàʔ.núʔ.māːn]) or Khwae Hanuman (แควหนุมาน) originates in South San Kamphaeng Mountain Range, the Khao Yai National park. It begins at the confluence of many small tributaries at Samphanta Subdistrict, Na Di District, Prachin Buri Province. It flows southward and joins the Phra Prong River to become the Bang Pakong River in Kabin Buri district, Prachinburi Province. The river is 25 kilometres (16 mi) long.
