= Bang Pakong River =

Coordinates: 13.4471°N 100.948°E

Bang Pakong River Jolo River
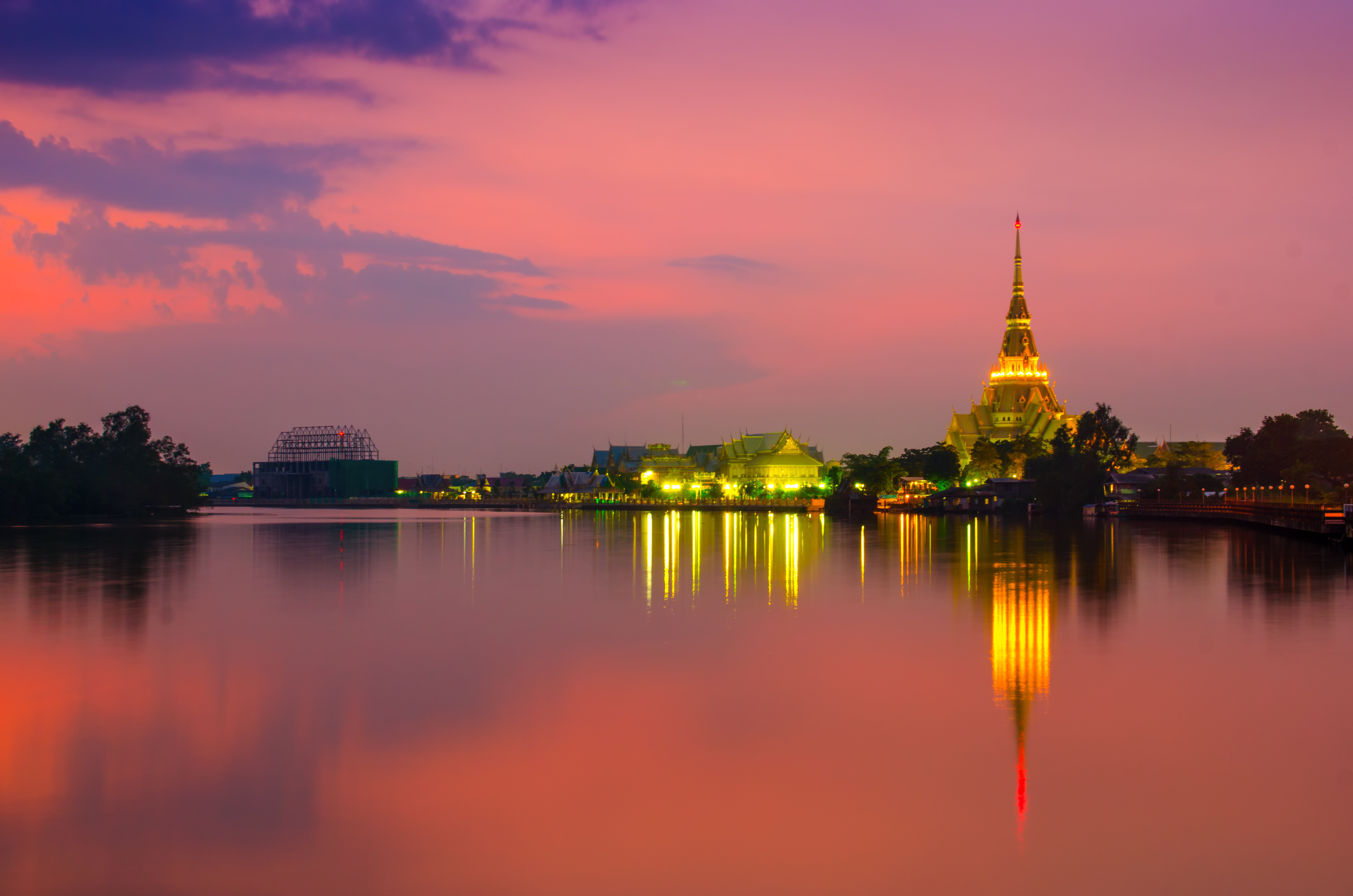
- Bang Pakong River and Wat Sothonwararam

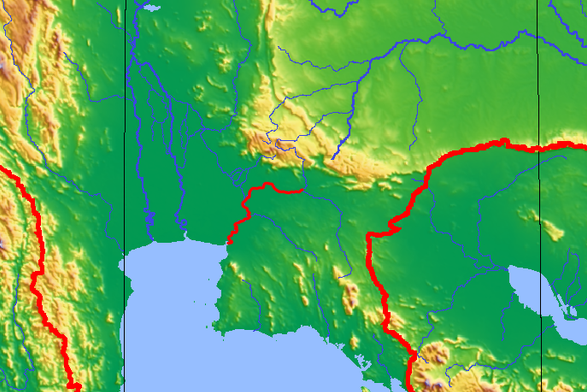
- Bang Pakong River highlighted in red
- Native name: แม่น้ำบางปะกง (Thai)

Location
- Country: Thailand

Physical characteristics
- Source
  - location: Confluence of Phra Prong River and Hanuman River
- Mouth
  - location: Bang Pakong District
  - elevation: 0 m (0 ft)
- Length: 231 km (144 mi)
- Basin size: 17,000 km^{2} (6,600 mi^{2})

Basin features
- River system: Bang Pakong

The Bang Pakong (Thai: แม่น้ำบางปะกง, RTGS: Maenam Bang Pakong, pronounced [mɛ̂ː.náːm bāːŋ pā.kōŋ]) is a river in east Thailand. The river originates at the confluence of the Phra Prong River and the Hanuman River near Kabin Buri, Prachinburi Province. It empties after 231 kilometres into the Gulf of Thailand at the northeastern tip of the Bay of Bangkok. The watershed of the Bang Pakong is about 17,000 square kilometres (6,600 mi^{2}). The river powers a power station near its mouth, near Highway 7.

To protect the Irrawaddy dolphins, fishermen on the Bang Pakong River have been persuaded by authorities to stop shrimping and 30 to 40 fishing boats have been modified so they can offer dolphin sightseeing tours.

Endangered sheatfish Ceratoglanis pachynema is endemic to the Bang Pakong.

Dvaravati settlements include Muang Phra Rot, Dong Si Maha Phot, Dong Lakhon, and Ban Khu Muang. Dvaravati coins have been found at U-Tapao.

== Toponymy ==
Its name "Bang Pakong" is believed to be distorted from the word "Bang Mangkong" (บางมังกง), refers to "place of Mangkong," for "Mangong" is Thai word meaning long whiskers catfish (Mystus gulio), a species of brackish water catfish that used to be found in this river.

This name has been mentioned in Sunthorn Phu's poem Nirat Mueang Klaeng (นิราศเมืองแกลง, "journey to Klaeng") since early Rattanakosin period.

Anyway, it is also proposed that the name may have a Khmer origin as a mixture of "Bang" in Thai, meaning "estuary community", and the word "Bongkong" (បង្កង) in Khmer meaning "prawn." Overall, it means "the river full of prawn."

Moreover, in Chachoengsao Province the river is locally known as the Jolo River (แม่น้ำโจ้โล้, RTGS: Maenam Cho Lo, pronounced [mɛ̂ː.náːm t͡ɕôː lóː], Chinese: 左鲈河, pinyin: zuǒ lú hé) a name derived from the Teochew word for barramundi (Lates calcarifer), reflecting the abundance of this fish in the area. Famous temples along the river include Wat Pak Nam Jolo and Wat Sothonwararam with Wat Saman Rattanaram.

== History ==
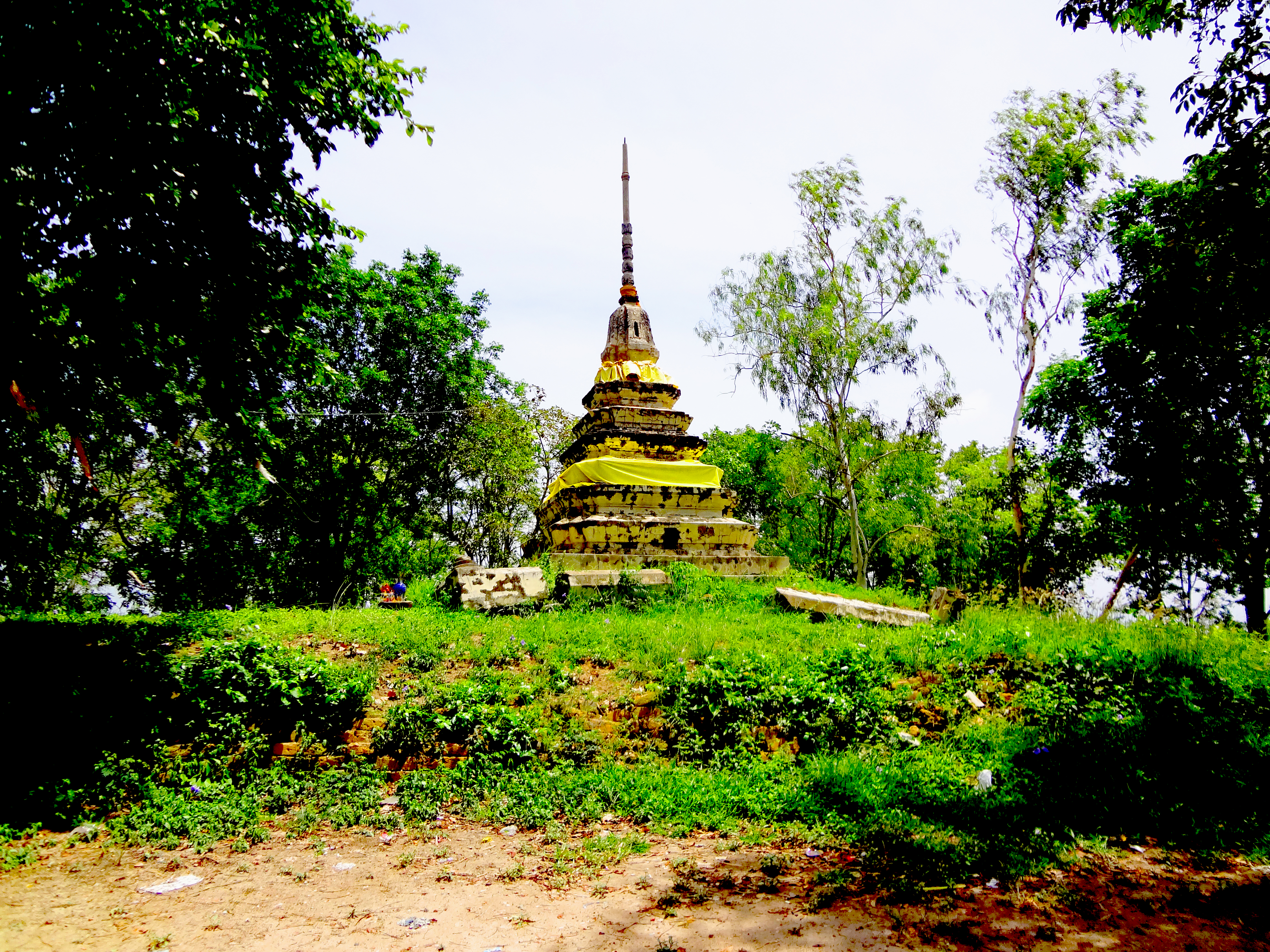
Remains of Phra That Mueang Pha Rot in 2012

Located in modern-day Na Phra That Subdistrict in Phanat Nikhom District, Chonburi province, the city of Mueang Phra Rot (Phra That Noen That) was established closed to the Bang Pakong river's mouth during the Dvaravati period. The city was in the shape of an irregular rectangle and was surrounded by a moat. Excavations from archeology sites in the former city revealed that it was inhabited from the 600s to the 1000s, and had ceramics imported from the Tang and Song dynasties, and early Islamic turquoise-blue glazed earthenware jars from either Persia or lower Mesopotamia.

To the east of Phra Rot was Mueang Sri Phalo, established near the end of Phra Rot in the 11th century. The settlement was located near the river's mouth and became a wealthy port and fishing town as such. Sri Phalo served as a stopping point for Khmer, Vietnamese and Chinese barques before they ventured into the Chao Phraya river. But during the 1300s, its prominence declined as the mouth of the Bang Pakong became shallower and moved away from the settlement. As a result of its economy declining, the inhabitants of Sri Phalo relocated south to Bang Pla Soi along the Gulf of Thailand. Construction of Sukhimvit road erased the town's eastern wall.

== Tributaries ==
- Nakhon Nayok River
