= Kabin Buri district =

Kabin กบินทร์บุรี
- District
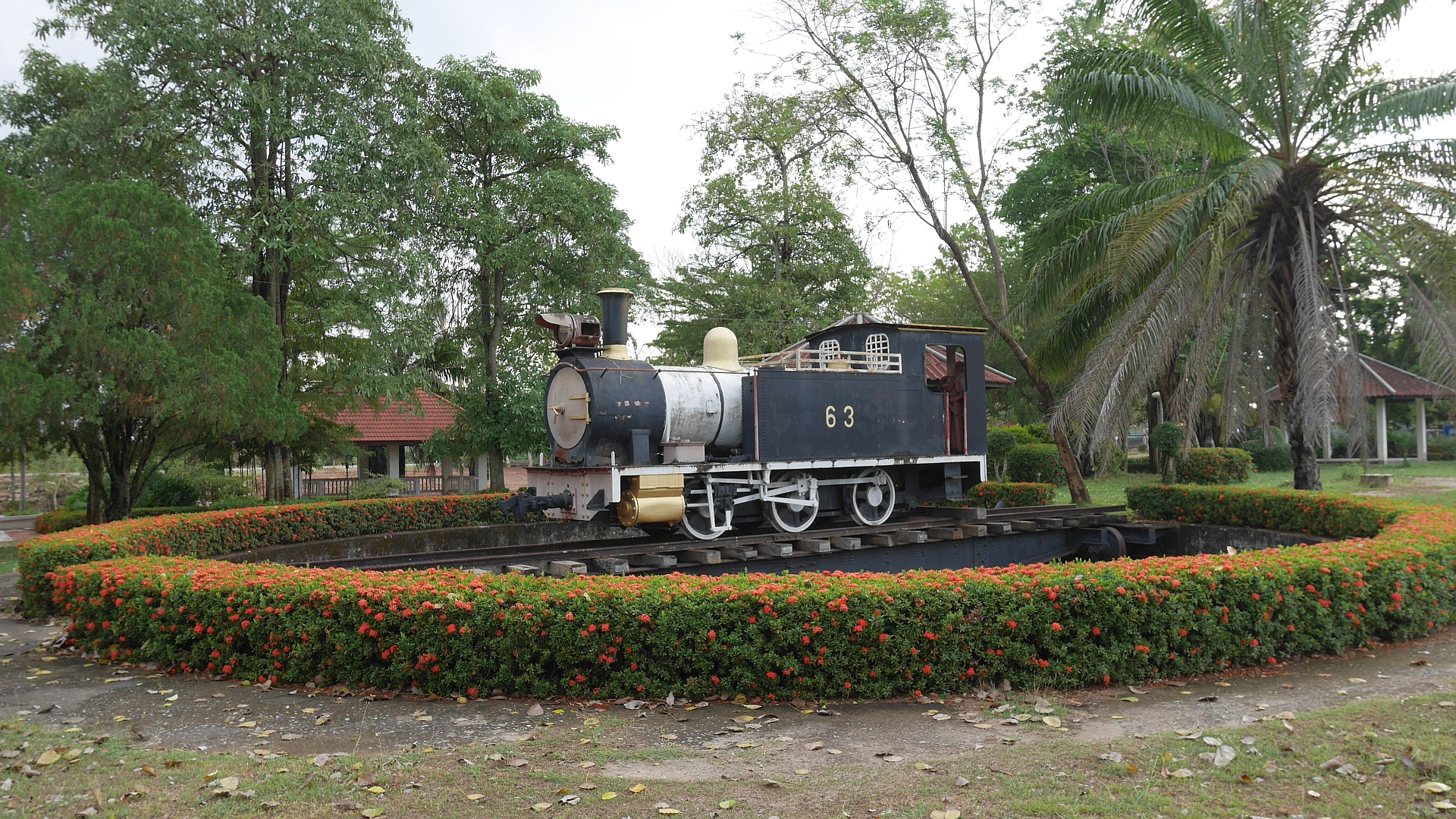

- District location in Prachinburi province
- Coordinates: 13°56′48″N 101°42′48″E
- Country: Thailand
- Province: Prachinburi

Area
  - Total: 1,309.28 km^{2} (505.52 sq mi)

Population (2005)
  - Total: 134,794
  - Density: 103/km^{2} (270/sq mi)
- Time zone: UTC+7 (ICT)
- Postal code: 25110
- Geocode: 2502

Kabin Buri (Thai: กบินทร์บุรี, pronounced [kā.bīn bū.rīː]) is a district (amphoe) in the southeastern part of Prachinburi province, eastern Thailand.

== History ==
Mueang Kabin Buri was an ancient city of the Ayutthaya kingdom. The city hall was in Ban Hanuman. In 1906 the city hall was moved to Ban Paknam, the area where the Hanuman and Phra Prong Rivers join to become the Bang Pakong River. On 1 April 1926 the province was abolished and the two districts, Mueang Kabin Buri and Aranyapathret, became districts of Prachinburi Province.

== Geography ==
Neighboring districts are (from the west clockwise): Si Maha Phot, Prachantakham, Na Di of Prachinburi Province; Mueang Sa Kaeo and Khao Chakan of Sa Kaeo province; and Sanam Chai Khet of Chachoengsao province.

The important water resources are the Hanuman, Phra Prong, and Bang Pakong Rivers.

== Climate ==
Climate data for Kabin Buri (1991–2020, extremes 1970-present)
Month	Jan	Feb	Mar	Apr	May	Jun	Jul	Aug	Sep	Oct	Nov	Dec	Year
Record high °C (°F)	38.2 (100.8)	39.8 (103.6)	40.8 (105.4)	42.9 (109.2)	41.7 (107.1)	38.2 (100.8)	36.7 (98.1)	37.0 (98.6)	38.0 (100.4)	38.4 (101.1)	37.7 (99.9)	36.1 (97.0)	42.9 (109.2)
Mean daily maximum °C (°F)	33.3 (91.9)	34.9 (94.8)	36.3 (97.3)	36.9 (98.4)	35.4 (95.7)	33.8 (92.8)	32.8 (91.0)	32.5 (90.5)	32.7 (90.9)	32.8 (91.0)	32.6 (90.7)	32.0 (89.6)	33.8 (92.9)
Daily mean °C (°F)	26.1 (79.0)	27.7 (81.9)	29.2 (84.6)	29.7 (85.5)	29.1 (84.4)	28.4 (83.1)	27.9 (82.2)	27.8 (82.0)	27.7 (81.9)	27.6 (81.7)	26.9 (80.4)	25.7 (78.3)	27.8 (82.1)
Mean daily minimum °C (°F)	20.5 (68.9)	22.0 (71.6)	24.0 (75.2)	24.9 (76.8)	25.3 (77.5)	25.1 (77.2)	24.7 (76.5)	24.7 (76.5)	24.6 (76.3)	24.2 (75.6)	22.6 (72.7)	20.6 (69.1)	23.6 (74.5)
Record low °C (°F)	10.1 (50.2)	13.0 (55.4)	14.5 (58.1)	18.0 (64.4)	20.0 (68.0)	19.3 (66.7)	20.5 (68.9)	20.5 (68.9)	19.2 (66.6)	16.4 (61.5)	13.4 (56.1)	8.5 (47.3)	8.5 (47.3)
Average precipitation mm (inches)	14.7 (0.58)	19.3 (0.76)	54.6 (2.15)	103.0 (4.06)	163.4 (6.43)	179.9 (7.08)	264.0 (10.39)	267.3 (10.52)	303.3 (11.94)	156.9 (6.18)	30.0 (1.18)	5.0 (0.20)	1,561.4 (61.47)
Average precipitation days (≥ 1.0 mm)	1.0	1.4	3.6	7.0	13.1	14.9	16.8	18.3	17.1	11.3	3.0	0.5	108
Average relative humidity (%)	69.2	68.6	71.1	73.9	79.5	82.4	84.1	84.8	84.9	81.3	73.5	68.7	76.8
Mean monthly sunshine hours	263.5	211.9	201.5	204.0	155.0	114.0	117.8	58.9	108.0	145.7	222.0	260.4	2,062.7
Mean daily sunshine hours	8.5	7.5	6.5	6.8	5.0	3.8	3.8	1.9	3.6	4.7	7.4	8.4	5.7
Source 1: World Meteorological Organization, Meteomanz (record)
Source 2: Office of Water Management and Hydrology, Royal Irrigation Department (sun 1981–2010) (extremes)

== Highways ==
- Highway 304 passes through Kabin Buri from Nonthaburi to Korat.
- Highway 33 passes through north side of Kabin Buri from Saraburi to Aranyaprathet.
- Highway 359 passes through the south side of the district connecting Highways 304 to Highway 33 and Highway 317.

== Administration ==
The district is divided into 14 sub-districts (tambons), which are further subdivided into 192 villages (mubans). There are three townships (thesaban tambons): Kabin covers parts of tambon Kabin, Mueang Kao covers parts of tambons Mueang Kao and Kabin, and Sa Bua parts of tambon Lat Takhian. There are a further 14 tambon administrative organizations (TAO).

No.	Name	Thai name	Villages	Pop.
1.	Kabin	กบินทร์	12	14,865
2.	Mueang Kao	เมืองเก่า	22	16,704
3.	Wang Dan	วังดาล	16	7,154
4.	Nonsi	นนทรี	16	7,746
5.	Yan Ri	ย่านรี	12	8,229
6.	Wang Takhian	วังตะเคียน	17	10,569
7.	Hat Nang Kaeo	หาดนางแก้ว	7	4,245
8.	Lat Takhian	ลาดตะเคียน	13	10,608
9.	Ban Na	บ้านนา	11	8,661
10.	Bo Thong	บ่อทอง	10	6,010
11.	Nong Ki	หนองกี่	12	11,574
12.	Na Khaem	นาแขม	11	4,524
13.	Khao Mai Kaeo	เขาไม้แก้ว	11	8,481
14.	Wang Tha Chang	วังท่าช้าง	22	15,424
