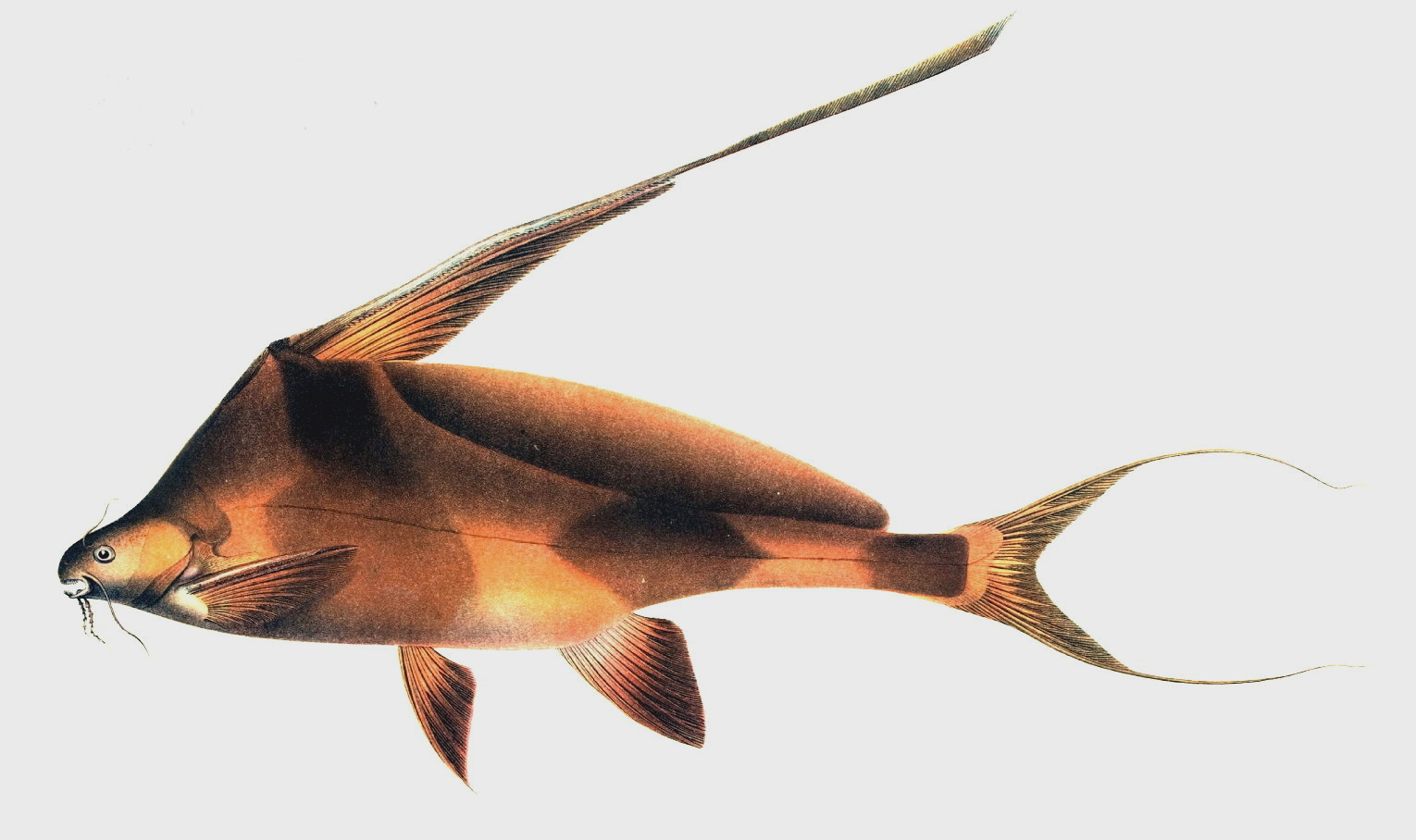

Conservation status
- Least Concern (IUCN 3.1)

Scientific classification
- Kingdom: Animalia
- Phylum: Chordata
- Class: Actinopterygii
- Division: Teleostei
- Order: Siluriformes
- Family: Bagridae
- Genus: Bagrichthys
- Species: B. hypselopterus

Binomial name
- Bagrichthys hypselopterus (Bleeker, 1852)

Synonyms
- Bagrus hypselopterus Bleeker, 1852

= Bagrichthys hypselopterus =

Species of catfish

Bagrichthys hypselopterus, the Emperor lancer catfish or black lancer catfish, is a species of freshwater ray-finned fish belonging to the family Bagridae, the naked or bagrid catfishes. This catfish is endemic to Indonesia where it is an important food fish.

== Taxonomy ==
Bagrichthys hypselopterus was first formally described as Bagrus hypselopterus in 1852 by the Dutch physician and ichthyologist Pieter Bleeker with its type locality given as Palembang, Sumatra. In 1857 Bleeker described the new genus Bagrichthys with B. hypselopterus as its only species, meaning that this species is the type species of that genus. The genus Bagrichthys is classified inthe family Bagridae, the bagrid or naked catfishes, which is classified in the suborder Siluroidei of the catfish order Siluriformes.

== Etymology ==
Bagrichthys hypselopterus is the type species of the genus Bagrichthys, this name suffixes the Greek word for a fish, -ichthys onto the genus name Bagrus, the genus Bleeker originally placed this species in. The specific name, hypselopterus, means "high-finned". This is an allusion to this species' extremely elongated first dorsal fin spine, which has a height that is almost double the depth of the body.

== Description ==
Bagrichthys hypselopterus has a more modified form than any other species in its genus. The front part of the body is very deep and laterally compressed with a very steep dorsal prfile of the head. The first spine of the dorsal fin is highly elongated and reached beyond the caudal fin when flattened against the back, with a serrated rear margin. The caudal peduncle is elongated and is longer than that of any other species in its genus. This species reaches a total length of 40 cm (16 in).

== Distribution and habitat ==
Bagrichthys hypselopterus is foundin Indonesia where it occusr in the Batang Hari and Musi River drainages in Sumatra, and the Kapuas River drainage in western Borneo. This catfish is found on the beds of deep rivers with a muddy bed and fast current.

== Utilisation ==
Bagrichthys hypselopterus is caught for food by subsistence fishers.
