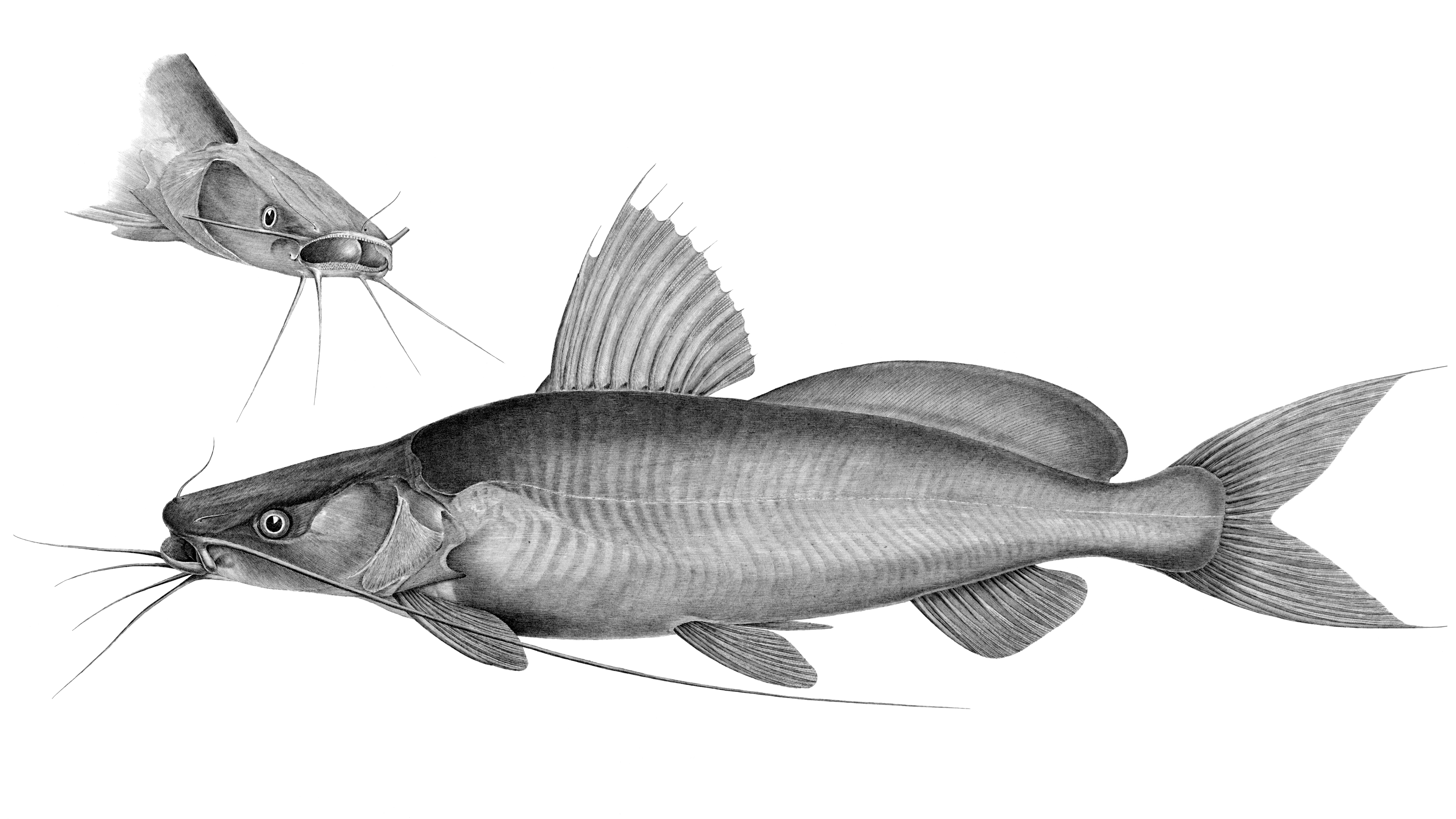
- Bagrus bajad

Scientific classification
- Kingdom: Animalia
- Phylum: Chordata
- Class: Actinopterygii
- Order: Siluriformes
- Family: Bagridae
- Genus: Bagrus; L. A. G. Bosc, 1816

Type species
- Silurus bajad Forsskål, 1775

Species
- 11, see text

Synonyms
- Porcus Saint-Hilaire, 1809 (see text)

= Bagrus =

Bagrus Temporal range: Late Miocene? - Recent 7.0–0 Ma

Genus of fishes

Bagrus is a genus of bagrid catfishes. These are relatively large catfish found in freshwater habitats in Africa, except for the virtually unknown B. tucumanus from South America, which likely is a synonym of Luciopimelodus pati.

== Taxonomy ==
The present scientific name Bagrus was first proposed by Louis Augustin Guillaume Bosc in 1816 for the bayad and its closest relatives. Although in 1809, Geoffroy Saint-Hilaire had already separated this fish in his new genus Porcus. But this was overruled by the ICZN, so that the junior synonym could continue to be used.

== Species ==
Eleven living species are placed here:

- Bagrus bajad (Forsskål, 1775) (Bayad)
- Bagrus caeruleus T. R. Roberts & D. J. Stewart, 1976
- Bagrus degeni Boulenger, 1906
- Bagrus docmak (Forsskål, 1775) (Semutundu)
- Bagrus filamentosus Pellegrin, 1924
- Bagrus lubosicus Lönnberg, 1924
- Bagrus meridionalis Günther, 1894 (Kampango, Kampoyo)
- Bagrus orientalis Boulenger, 1902
- Bagrus tucumanus Burmeister, 1861
- Bagrus ubangensis Boulenger, 1902
- Bagrus urostigma Vinciguerra, 1895 (Somalia Catfish)

A possible fossil Bagrus from about 7 million years ago, found in Late Miocene Baynunah Formation rocks near Ruwais (Abu Dhabi), has been described:

- Bagrus shuwaiensis Forey & Young, 1999

However, it is not quite clear whether it belongs in Bagrus or some other Bagridae genus, or even in the Claroteidae.
