= Trang River =

River in Thailand

Coordinates: 7.702972°N 99.556492°E

The Trang River (Thai: แม่น้ำตรัง, RTGS: Mae Nam Trang, pronounced [mɛ̂ː náːm tráŋ]) is a major river in Trang Province, Thailand, alongside the Palian River. It has two primary sources: one originating from Khao Luang, the highest peak of the Nakhon Si Thammarat Range in Nakhon Si Thammarat Province, and another from Krabi Province. Both tributaries flow southward and converge at the Banthat Range in Phatthalung Province before entering Trang Province.

Within Trang, the river traverses several districts, including Ratsada, Huai Yot, Wang Wiset, Na Yong, Kantang, and the southeastern portion of Mueang Trang. It discharges into the Andaman Sea at the Kantang estuary in Kantang District, which also houses Kantang Port. The river extends approximately 123 km (76.4 mi) in length and has an average width of 30 m (98.4 ft). Significant tributaries include Khlong Chi (คลองชี), Khlong Tha Pradu (คลองท่าประดู่), Khlong Kapang (คลองกะปาง), Khlong Muan (คลองมวน), Khlong Yang Yuan (คลองยางยวน), Khlong Lam Phu Ra (คลองลำภูรา), Khlong Nang Noi (คลองนางน้อย), and Khlong Sawang (คลองสว่าง).

Due to the relatively narrow basin of the Trang River, arable land for rice cultivation is limited. The region experiences seasonal flooding typically from October through December annually.

The river supports diverse aquatic fauna. Common species include catfish such as Hemibagrus filamentus and H. nemurus. The rare Indo-Pacific shortfin eel, Anguilla bicolor bicolor, is notably abundant in the river, migrating from marine to freshwater habitats to mature. These eels are integral to local culinary traditions and have been a dietary staple in Trang for generations.

On May 18, 2021, a 70 cm (2.3 ft) female bull shark was captured within the river's waters in Mueang Trang District.

Historically, the Trang River has played a significant role in the region's development over the past millennium. It is believed that in ancient times the river was approximately 50 m (164 ft) wide with a higher water level, serving as a crucial navigation route from the Andaman coast to Thung Song in Nakhon Si Thammarat Province, and continuing to the Tapee River leading to Bandon Bay on the Gulf of Thailand. These conditions are estimated to have prevailed over 1,300 years ago.

The origin of the name "Trang" is theorized to derive from the Malay word Tarangque, meaning "dawn" or "morning". This etymology may be linked to Malay merchants who arrived at the river's mouth during dawn while trading with Ayutthaya or other kingdoms, establishing Trang as a principal seaport on the Malay Peninsula's Andaman coast.

Within Mueang Trang District, the river is also referred to as Khlong Tha Chin (คลองท่าจีน, lit. 'river of Chinese piers'), a name reflecting the presence of historic Chinese settlements along its banks, including in Bang Rak and Thap Thiang sub-districts. Despite the similarity in name, this river is unrelated to the Tha Chin River located in central Thailand.
