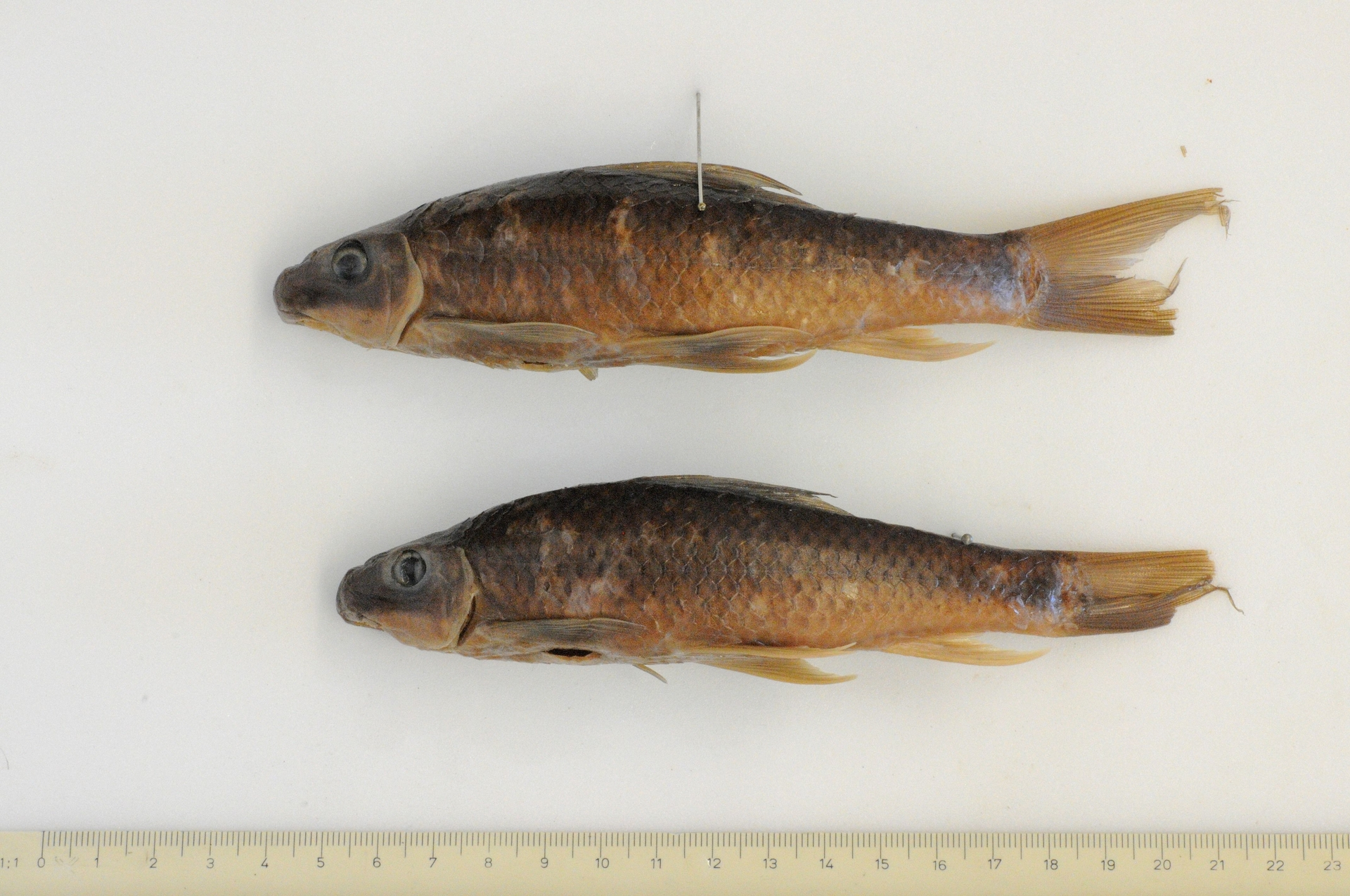

Conservation status
- Least Concern (IUCN 3.1)

Scientific classification
- Kingdom: Animalia
- Phylum: Chordata
- Class: Actinopterygii
- Division: Teleostei
- Order: Siluriformes
- Family: Bagridae
- Genus: Hemibagrus
- Species: H. fortis

Binomial name
- Hemibagrus fortis (Popta, 1904)

Synonyms
- Macrones fortis Popta, 1904; Macrones howong Popta, 1904; Macrones bo Popta, 1904; Macrones kajan Popta, 1904; Macrones fortis capitulum Popta, 1906; Hemibagrus capitulum (Popta, 1906)

= Hemibagrus fortis =

Species of bagrid catfish

Hemibagrus fortis is a species of bagrid catfish found in the Rajang basin in Sarawak, Malaysia. This catfish share the common name ikan Baung or 白须公 with another similar species Hemibagrus nemurus.
