= Olyra collettii =

Scientific classification
- Kingdom: Animalia
- Phylum: Chordata
- Class: Actinopterygii
- Order: Siluriformes
- Family: Bagridae
- Genus: Olyra
- Species: O. collettii

Binomial name
- Olyra collettii (Steindachner, 1881)

Synonyms
- Heptapterus collettii Steindachner, 1881; Acentronichthys collettii (Steindachner, 1881); Myoglanis collettii (Steindachner, 1881)

Species of fish

Olyra collettii is a species of longtail catfish. This species grows to 5.82 cm (2.29 in) in standard length. This species is possibly a junior synonym of Olyra longicaudata.
