= Asam pedas =

Southeast Asian dish

Asam pedas اسم ڤدس
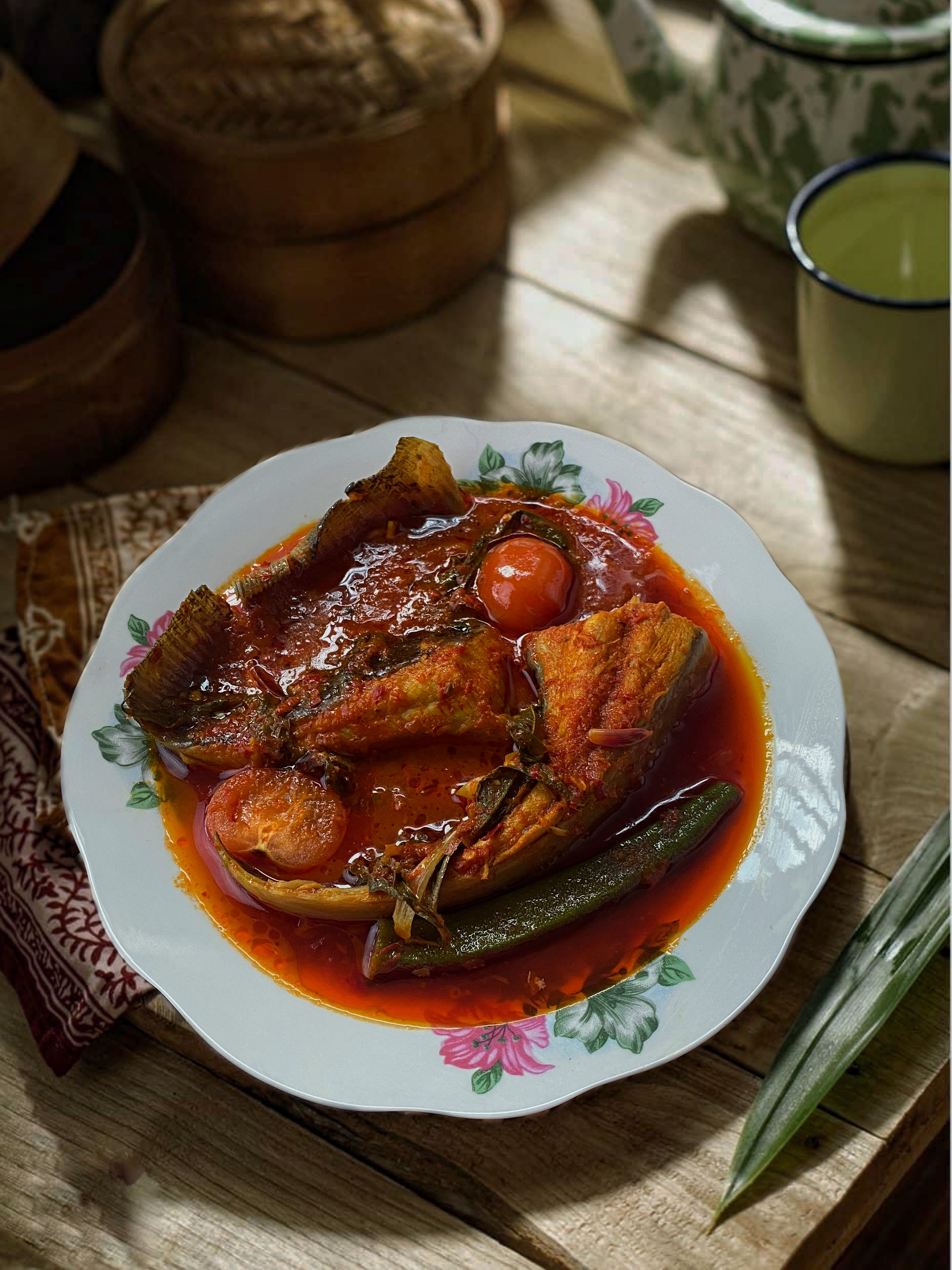
- Asam pedas ikan pari, a sour and spicy stingray stew
- Course: Main course
- Place of origin: Maritime Southeast Asia
- Region or state: Sumatra, Malay Peninsula, Borneo
- Associated cuisine: Indonesia, Malaysia and Singapore
- Serving temperature: Hot or room temperature
- Main ingredients: Spicy, sour fish stew made with chillies and tamarind
- Variations: Gulai, Asam rebus

Asam pedas (Malay for "sour spicy"; Malay pronunciation: [ˌasam pəˈdas]) is a traditional sour and spicy gulai commonly found in Southeast Asia, particularly in Malaysia, Indonesia and Singapore. The dish is typically associated with Malay, Minangkabau, Acehnese and Peranakan cuisines, and is prepared using various types of seafood or freshwater fish.

The broth is made with a combination of chillies and spices, with the sour element derived from ingredients such as tamarind, asam keping (dried Garcinia slices) or lime juice, depending on regional variations. Regional names for the dish include asam padeh (Minangkabau), asam keueung (Acehnese) and gerang asam (Baba Malay or Peranakan).

The development of asam pedas is commonly associated with several regions of maritime Southeast Asia, notably the historic trading port of Malacca in the Malay Peninsula and the Minangkabau heartlands of West Sumatra. These areas contributed to the evolution of the dish through long-standing cultural exchanges and regional trade networks. Influences from various culinary traditions led to the adaptation of local ingredients and cooking methods, resulting in distinct regional expressions of the dish.

Today, asam pedas remains a widely prepared dish across Peninsular Malaysia, Sumatra, Borneo and the Riau Archipelago. The variations in ingredients, preparation techniques and flavour profiles across these areas reflect the diverse cultural and geographical contexts that have shaped its development.

== Historical and cultural origins ==
Asam pedas is part of the shared culinary heritage of both Malay and Minangkabau traditions, making its exact origin unclear.

One theory suggests that ''Asam pedas'' originated in the port city of Malacca, where maritime trade facilitated contact between local, Chinese and Portuguese communities. These interactions are believed to have influenced the development of the dish, particularly through the introduction of tamarind, which imparts a sour flavour, and the use of chilli, lemongrass and turmeric as key seasonings. Asam pedas also shows influences from Peranakan (Baba-Nyonya) cuisine, which incorporates elements of Malay and Chinese culinary traditions.

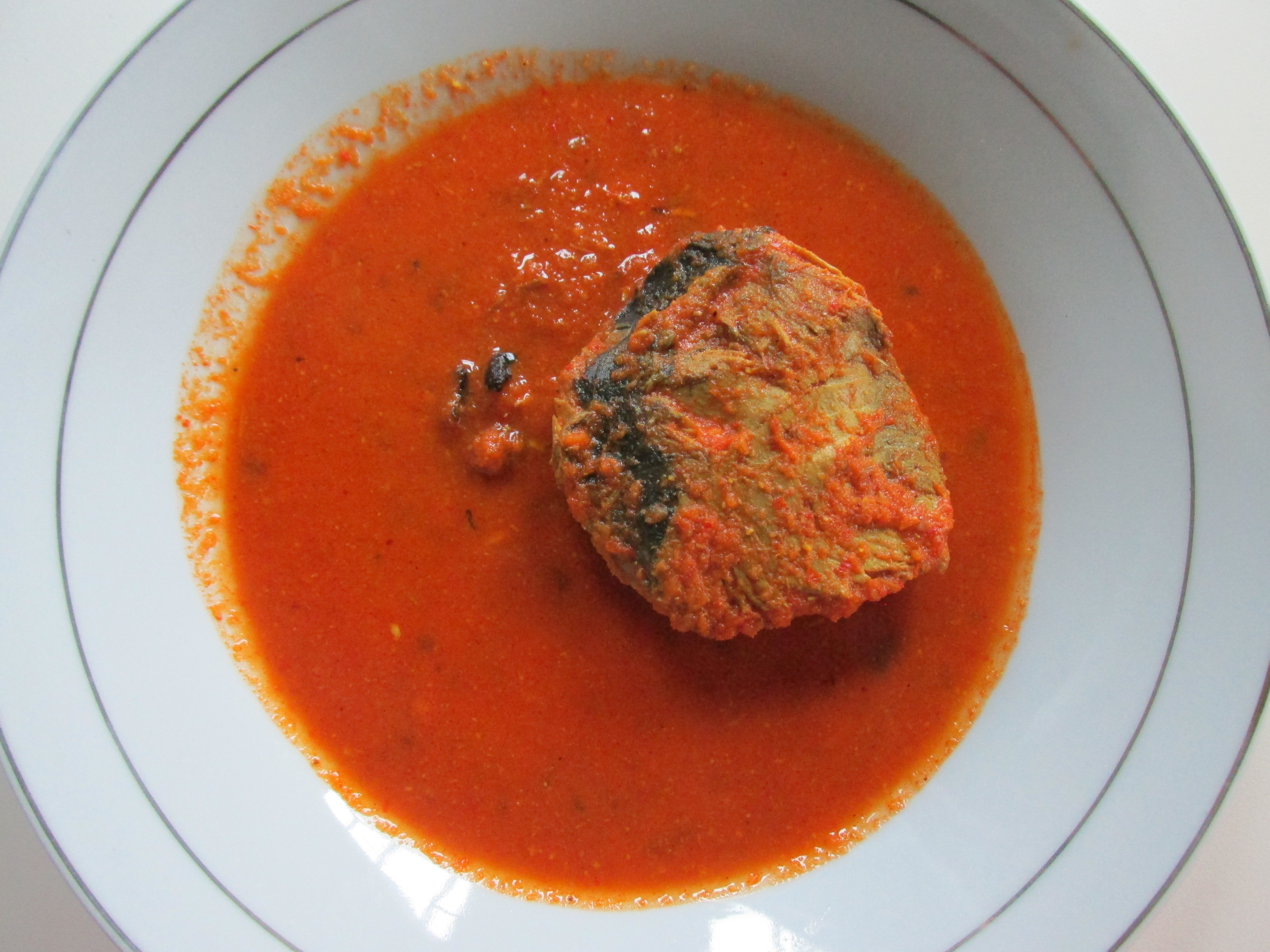
A plate of asam padeh, the Minangkabau variant of asam pedas

The dish is also associated with the Minangkabau people of West Sumatra in Indonesia, where a similar preparation known as asam padeh is part of traditional Minangkabau cuisine. This version, known for its sour and spicy flavour profile, is widely prepared in Padang restaurants. These establishments, which specialise in Minangkabau dishes, are common throughout Indonesia and also present in parts of Malaysia and Singapore, helping to popularise the dish beyond its original context.

The spread of asam pedas has also been linked to the extensive maritime trade routes and cultural exchanges among Malay-speaking populations throughout the Malay Archipelago. Today, it is commonly prepared in regions such as Jambi, Riau, the Riau Islands, Aceh, Johore, Malacca, Singapore, and parts of Borneo, particularly Pontianak in West Kalimantan. While the core elements often include fish simmered in a sour and spicy broth, the choice of souring agents such as tamarind, asam kandis or lime juice and other ingredients varies across regions

== Culinary characteristics ==
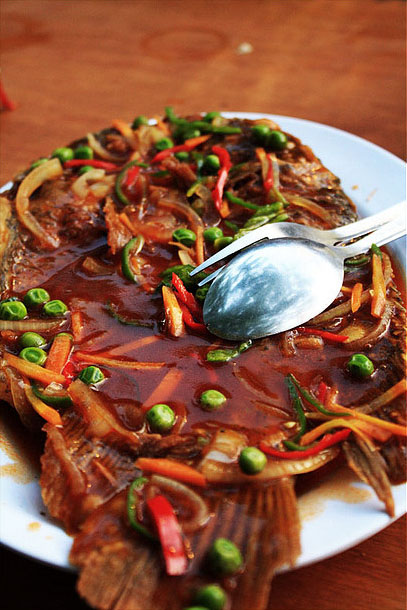
Gurame asam pedas, featuring deep-fried gourami

Asam pedas is traditionally prepared using seafood or freshwater fish simmered in a sour tamarind-based broth flavoured with chillies and a blend of spices. While tamarind pulp, usually soaked in water and strained to extract its juice, is the most common souring agent, commercial tamarind paste is also used as a convenient alternative. Some regional variations instead use asam kandis (Garcinia xanthochymus) or asam sunti, a sun-dried and salted form of bilimbi (Averrhoa bilimbi), to achieve a similar tangy profile. Key ingredients often include onion, ginger, chilli paste, turmeric, fermented shrimp paste, salt, daun kesum (Persicaria odorata) and water. Vegetables such as brinjals, okra and tomatoes are frequently added to enhance the flavour and texture of the stew.

The types of fish used in asam pedas vary widely and include mackerel, mackerel tuna (Euthynnus affinis), tuna, skipjack tuna, red snapper, gourami, pangasius, hemibagrus and cuttlefish. These may be cooked whole or with only the fish heads included to create a spicy and sour fish stew. To maintain the fish's integrity and presentation, it is generally added towards the end of the cooking process. This method ensures the fish remains intact when served, preserving both its appearance and texture.

=== Regional variations and culinary significance ===
==== Malay Peninsula and Singapore ====
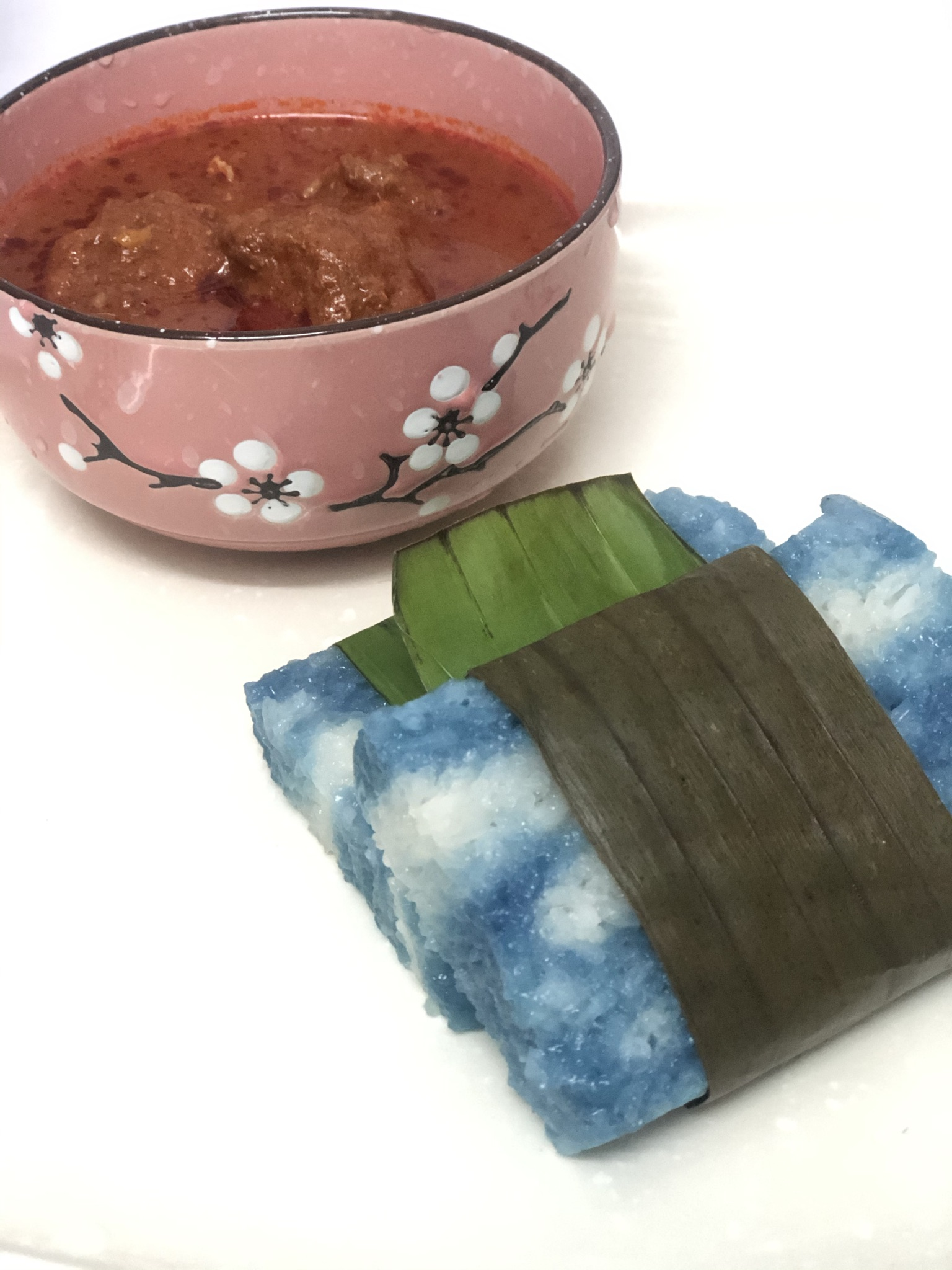
Pulut tetal with gerang asam daging, a Malaccan Baba Nyonya dish of butterfly pea flower–coloured glutinous rice served with a Peranakan beef asam pedas.

The preparation of asam pedas varies significantly across regions, reflecting local tastes, available ingredients and culinary traditions. In Malacca, the dish tends to have a more soupy consistency while retaining its signature sour and spicy flavour profile. This version is typically prepared with fenugreek seeds (halba), cumin seeds (jintan), candlenuts (buah keras) and galangal, with kaffir lime leaves often used as an aromatic in place of daun kesum.

The Peranakan version, commonly known as gerang asam ikan, is distinguished by its deeper use of root spices compared to the Malay preparations. It typically features fresh whole fish simmered with tamarind, chillies and herbs like daun kesum. Some recipes may include bunga kantan (torch ginger), though this is sometimes avoided by traditional cooks who prefer to retain the dish's original herbal balance.

In Johor, regional variations also emerge. In the southern part of the state, asam pedas is prepared with a thicker, more robust gravy, often enhanced with black pepper and occasionally pickled mustard leaves (sawi masin) to intensify its sourness. Conversely, northern Johor localities such as Tangkak, Muar, Batu Pahat and Kluang favour a thinner consistency and typically exclude black pepper. A common adaptation known as asam pedas ayam replaces fish with chicken, offering a variation on the traditional base.

Within the Melayu-Bugis community of Johor, asam pedas is also called nasu metti. It is traditionally served alongside rice cakes such as burasak and lepat lui, especially during festive occasions like Eid, reflecting the cultural continuity of Bugis-Malay traditions in the region.

In Kedah, the dish exhibits strong Thai culinary influences and is often prepared with freshwater fish. Sourness is derived from a variety of agents including tamarind juice, asam keping (dried slices of Garcinia atroviridis), or lime juice. The spice blend commonly features cumin seeds, contributing to the dish's distinctive aromatic profile.

==== Sumatra ====
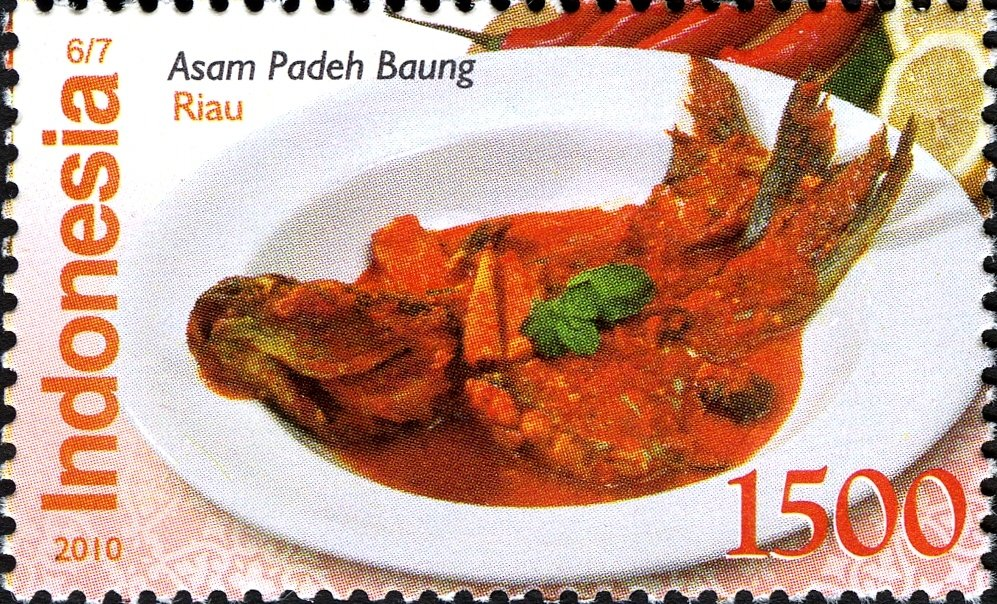
2010 Indonesian postage stamp featuring Asam Padeh Baung, Riau

A regional variation in Riau, known as asam pedas ikan baung, uses baung fish (Hemibagrus nemurus), which is marinated with asam kandis or tamarind to reduce its odour and impart a distinctive sourness to the broth. In the Riau Archipelago, particularly in Lingga, asam pedas is traditionally served with lempeng sagu, a flat sago cake made by roasting sago flour with grated coconut and seasoning. This accompaniment, which dates back to the Riau-Lingga Sultanate period, is commonly eaten for breakfast or during communal gatherings.

Among the Minangkabau people of West Sumatra, a related dish called asam padeh daging substitutes fish with beef as the primary protein. The dish is known for its sour and spicy broth, commonly flavoured with asam kandis (Garcinia xanthochymus). While beef remains the conventional ingredient, contemporary variations may incorporate fish or chicken. Asam padeh daging is a staple in Padang restaurants and frequently served at ceremonial events.

In Aceh, a similar sour and spicy dish known as asam keueng, also referred to as asam pedas Aceh, represents a regional adaptation of the broader asam pedas tradition. Its distinctive sourness is derived from asam sunti, a preserved form of sun-dried and salted belimbing wuluh (bilimbi). The broth, typically enriched with turmeric, chillies and local spices, is commonly served with seafood such as mackerel tuna, prawns or other locally available fish varieties.

== Local variations ==
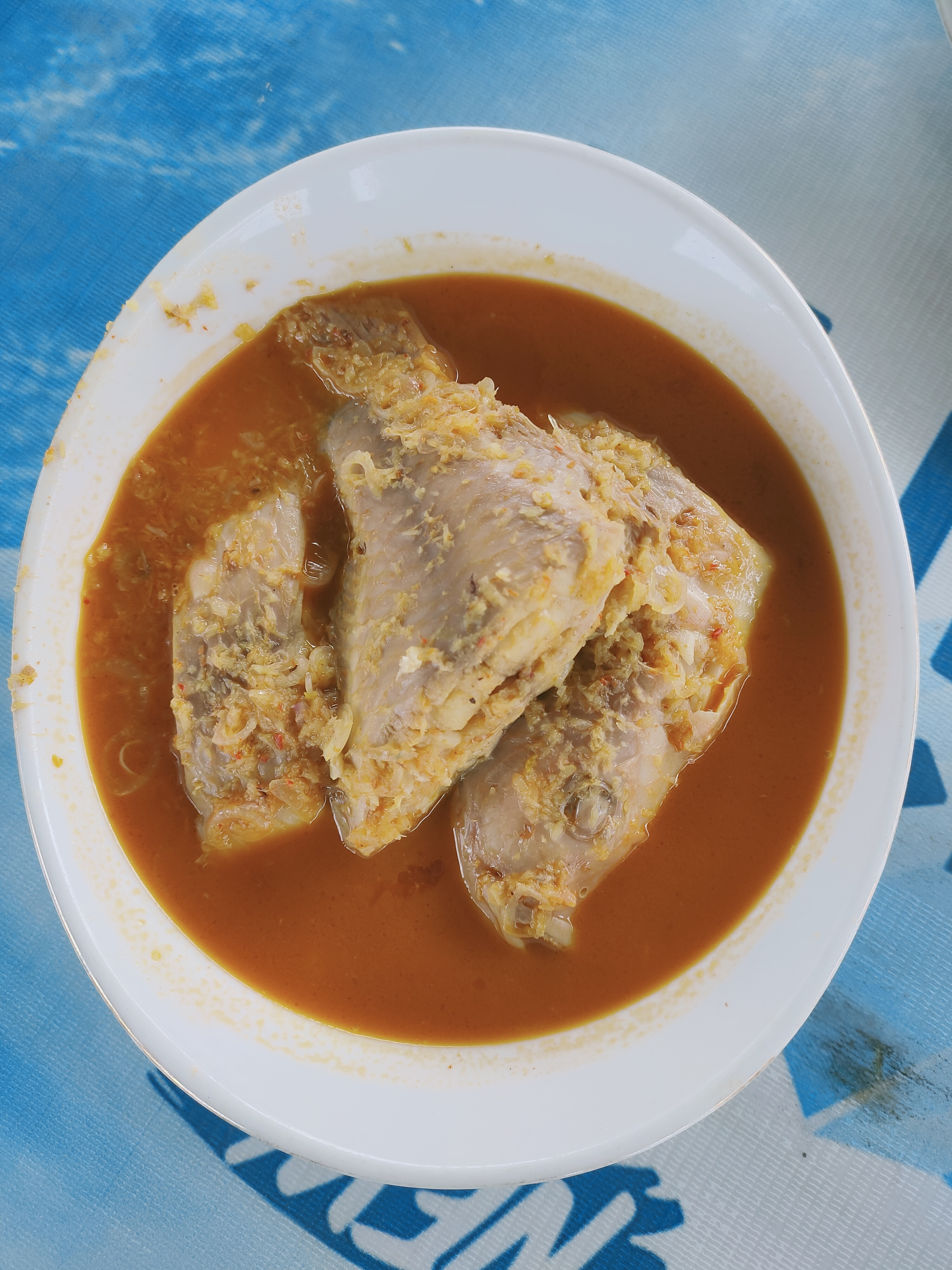
Asam pedas ikan in Mempawah, West Kalimantan, Indonesia

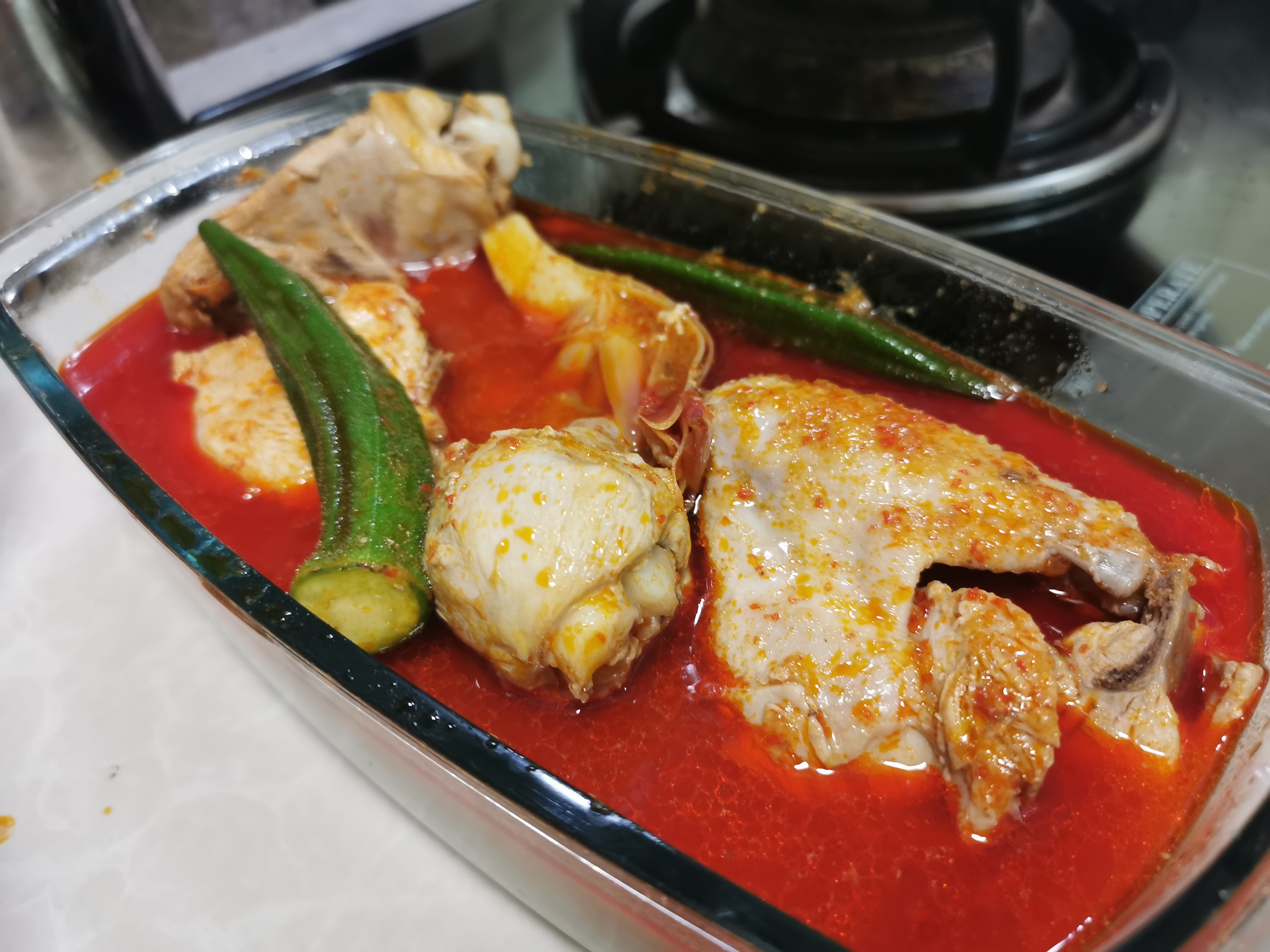
Asam pedas ayam, a regional variation from Johor, Malaysia, substituting chicken for fish

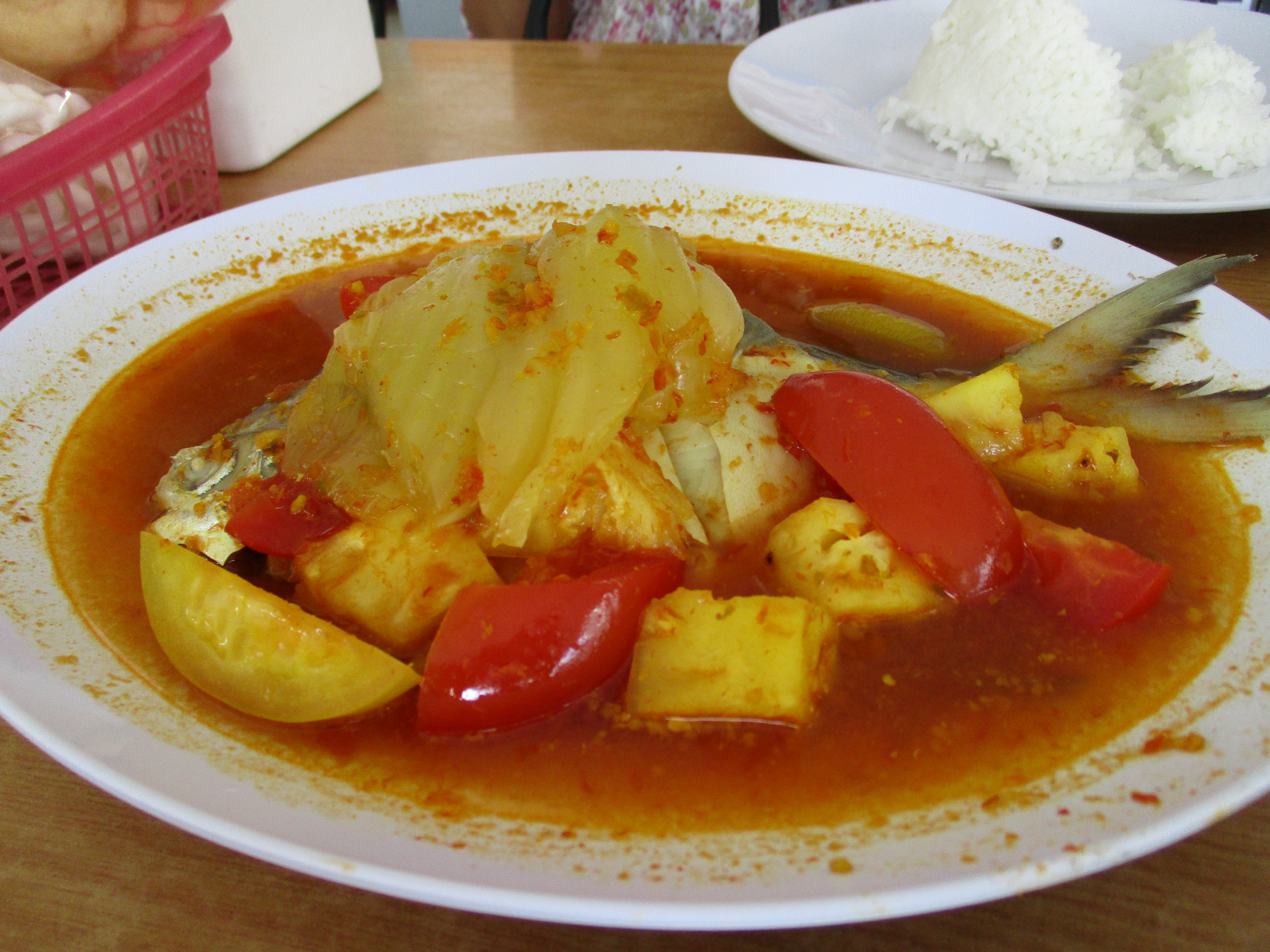
Asam pedas ikan featuring snapper fish, prepared and served in Batam, part of the Riau Islands, Indonesia

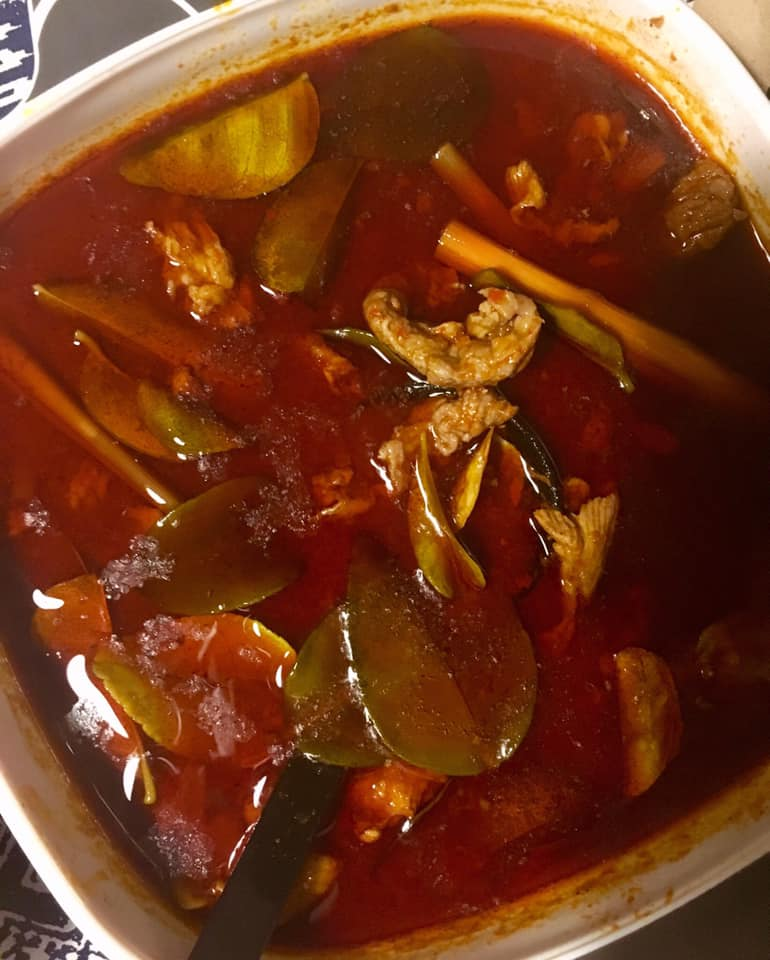
Asam pedas tetel (beef cut), a version of the dish from Malacca, Malaysia

== See also ==
- Gulai
- Kaeng som
- Pindang
- Fish stew
- List of fish dishes
- List of stews
