= Hemibagrus gracilis =

Conservation status
- Least Concern (IUCN 3.1)

Scientific classification
- Kingdom: Animalia
- Phylum: Chordata
- Class: Actinopterygii
- Division: Teleostei
- Order: Siluriformes
- Family: Bagridae
- Genus: Hemibagrus
- Species: H. gracilis

Binomial name
- Hemibagrus gracilis P. K. L. Ng & H. H. Ng, 1995

Species of bagrid catfish

Hemibagrus gracilis is a species of bagrid catfish from the Malay Peninsula. This species reaches a length of 40.5 cm (15.9 in).
