= Hemibagrus bongan =

Scientific classification
- Domain: Eukaryota
- Kingdom: Animalia
- Phylum: Chordata
- Class: Actinopterygii
- Order: Siluriformes
- Family: Bagridae
- Genus: Hemibagrus
- Species: H. bongan

Binomial name
- Hemibagrus bongan (Popta, 1904)

Synonyms
- Macrones bongan Popta, 1904

Species of bagrid catfish

Hemibagrus bongan is a species of bagrid catfish found in Asia.
