= Hemibagrus amemiyai =

Scientific classification
- Domain: Eukaryota
- Kingdom: Animalia
- Phylum: Chordata
- Class: Actinopterygii
- Order: Siluriformes
- Family: Bagridae
- Genus: Hemibagrus
- Species: H. amemiyai

Binomial name
- Hemibagrus amemiyai (Sh. Kimura, 1934)

Synonyms
- Aoria amemiyai Kimura, 1934 Mystus amemiyai (Kimura, 1934)

Species of fish

Hemibagrus amemiyai is a species of bagrid catfish found in Howchan in Sichuan Province in China.
