= Pindang =

Indonesian cooking method

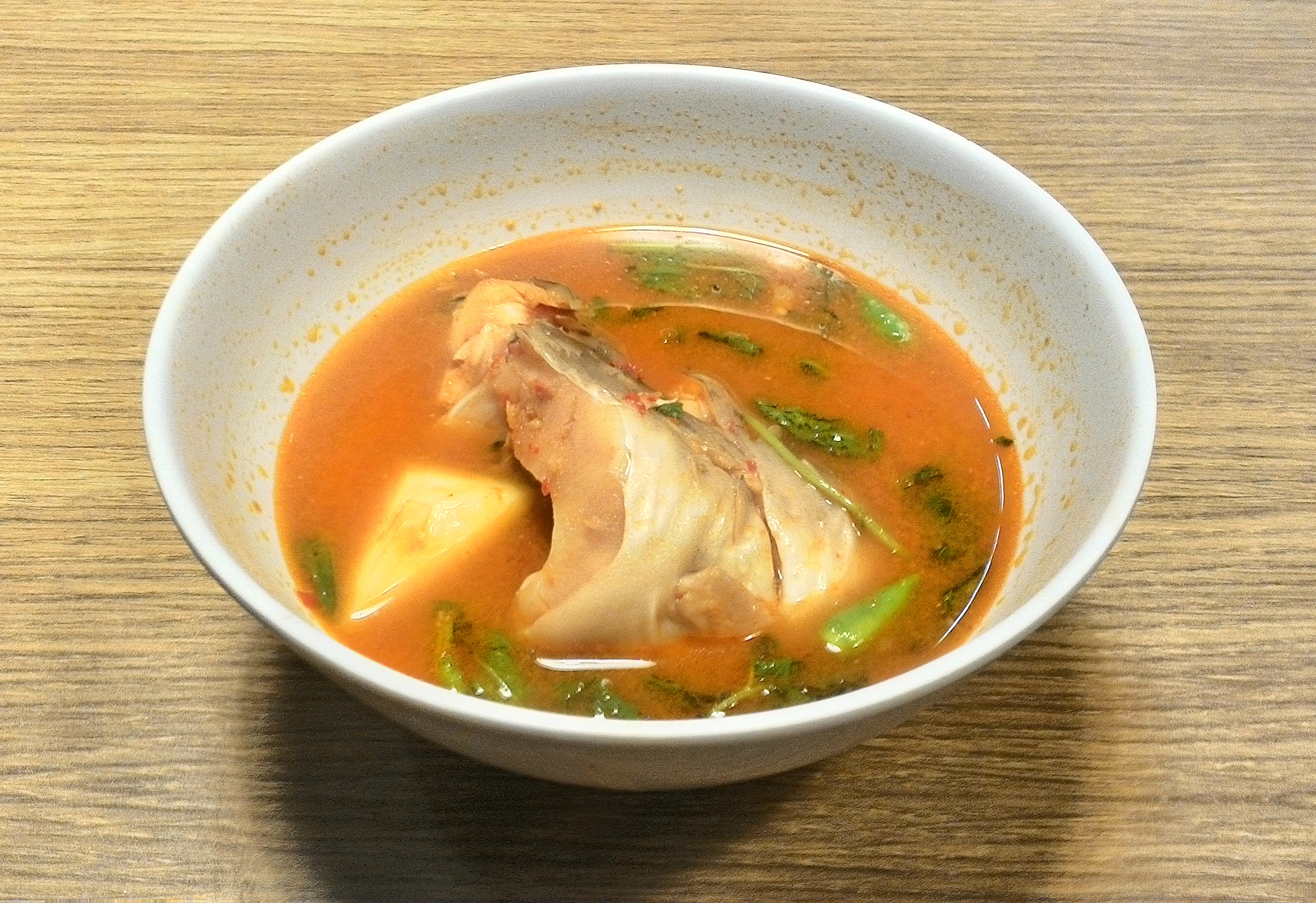
- Pindang patin, pangasius fish in pindang soup
- Place of origin: Indonesia
- Region or state: South Sumatra
- Associated cuisine: Indonesia, Malaysia and Singapore
- Main ingredients: salt-boiled fish, i.e. fish cooked in salt and spices including tamarind juice, garlic, shallot, ginger, turmeric, lemongrass, galangal, chili pepper, Indonesian bayleaf, citrus leaf, shrimp paste, and palm sugar.

Pindang refers to a cooking method in the Indonesian and Malay language of boiling ingredients in brine or acidic solutions. Usually employed to cook fish or egg, the technique is native to Sumatra especially in Palembang, but has spread to Java and Kalimantan. The term also could refer to a specific sour and spicy fish soup which employs seasonings like tamarind. Pindang has food preservation properties, which extends the shelf life of fish products.

== Terminology ==
The Indonesian dictionary describes pindang as "salted and seasoned fish, and then smoked or boiled until dry for preservation". In Indonesia, various boiled fish products are generally known as pindang. In Malaysia, it is known as pindang in Southwest coast of Malay peninsula, and singgang in Northeast coast of Malay peninsula.

Pindang is often described as Indonesian salt-boiled fish, particularly in Java. On the other hand, in Bali pindang specifically refers to seasoned fish brine, where rujak kuah pindang, or Bali style fruit rujak with fish brine stock is a popular dish.

== As a dish ==
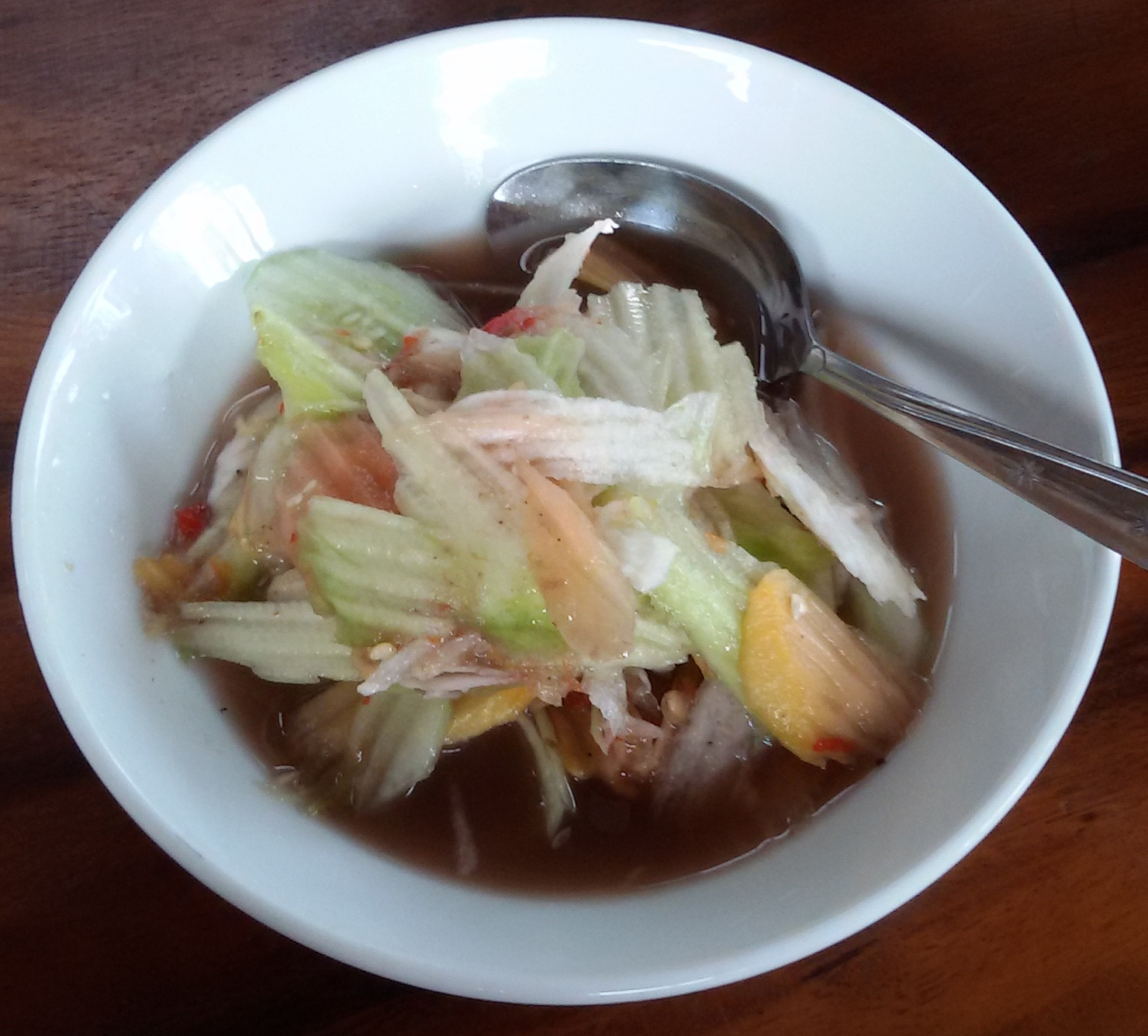
Rujak kuah pindang of Bali

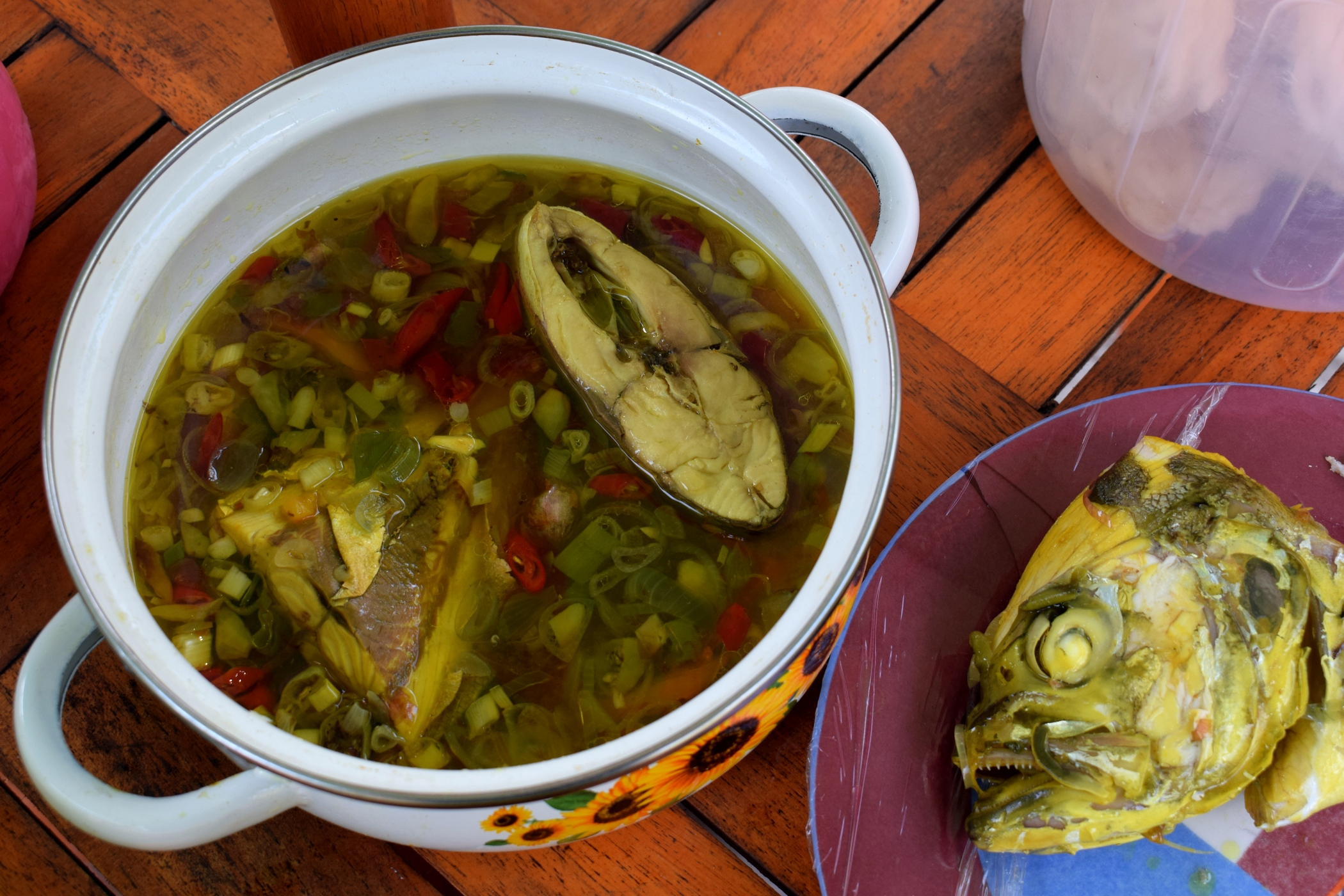
Pindang serani of Karimunjawa islands in the center of Java Sea, uses grouper.

Although cooking methods and dishes described as pindang could be found all across Indonesia, from Jepara and Banyuwangi in coastal Java to fishing towns of Sumatra, pindang is strongly associated with the local cuisine of Palembang, where pindang patin (Pangasius fish pindang) is its specialty, and the province has rich variety of pindang dishes.

Freshwater fish such as ikan patin (Pangasius sp.), catfish, carp or gourami are popularly used to cook pindang. However, seafood such as red snapper, milkfish, mackerel, tuna, grouper, or shrimp can be cooked as pindang as well.

The cleaned fish flesh is boiled in water mixed in spices, including tamarind juice, garlic, shallot, ginger, turmeric, lemongrass, galangal, chili pepper, daun salam (Indonesian bayleaf), citrus leaf, shrimp paste, palm sugar and salt. The soup usually also contains pieces of chili pepper, tomato, cucumber, lemon basil and pineapple. This soupy dish has a pronounced sourness with a hint of mild sweetness and light hot spicyness. Beef may also be used in the preparation of Indonesian-style pindang.

In Malaysia, pindang is consumed in Southwest coast of Malay peninsula, the region that facing Malacca strait and Sumatra, with some region has its own variation and different names. For example, pindang recipes have been pass down for generation by Chitty, the Peranakan Tamils of Malacca that is unique to the state.

== As preservation method ==
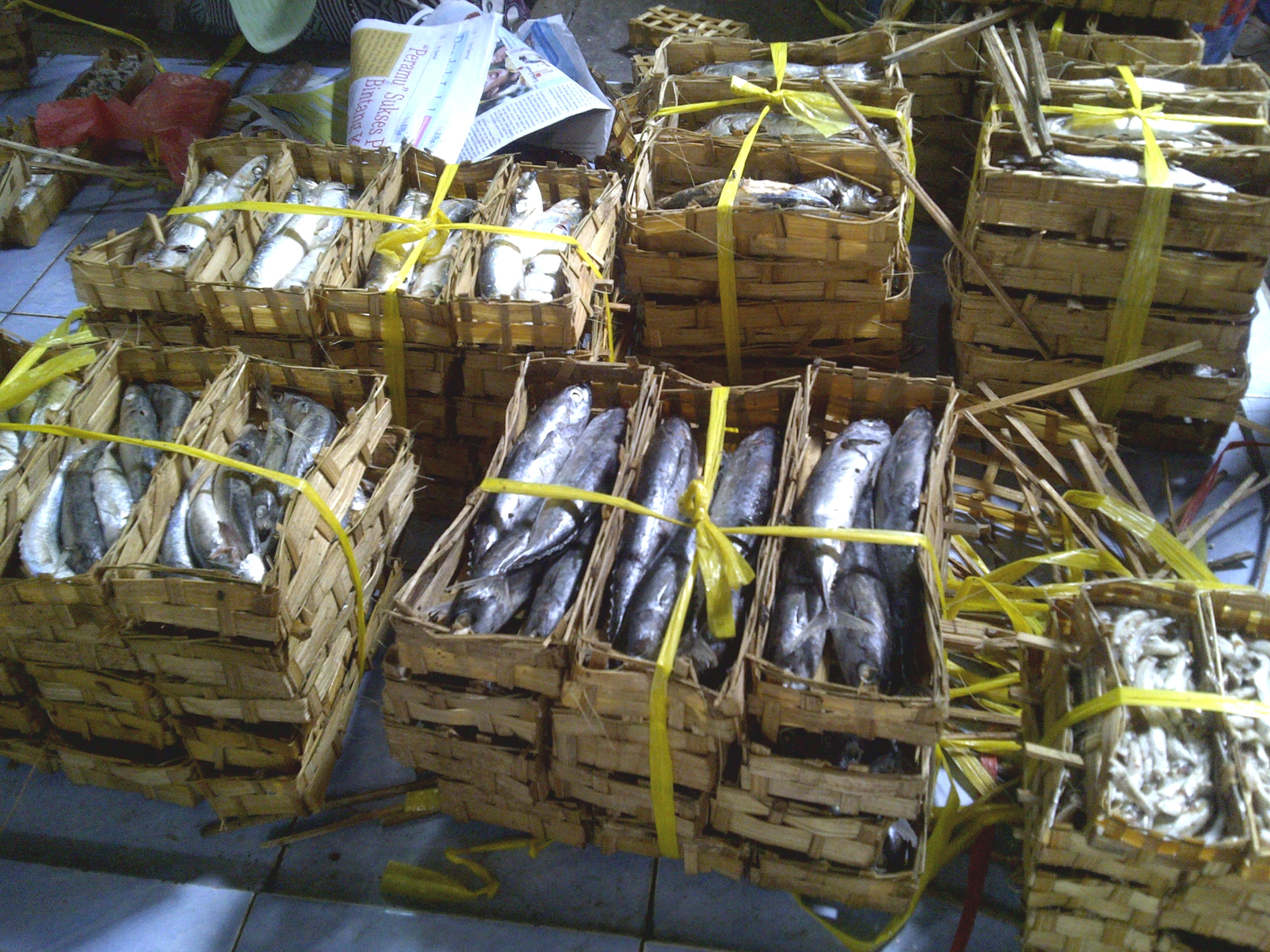
Bamboo-packed mackerel pindang sold in Kalibaru traditional market in Banyuwangi, East Java

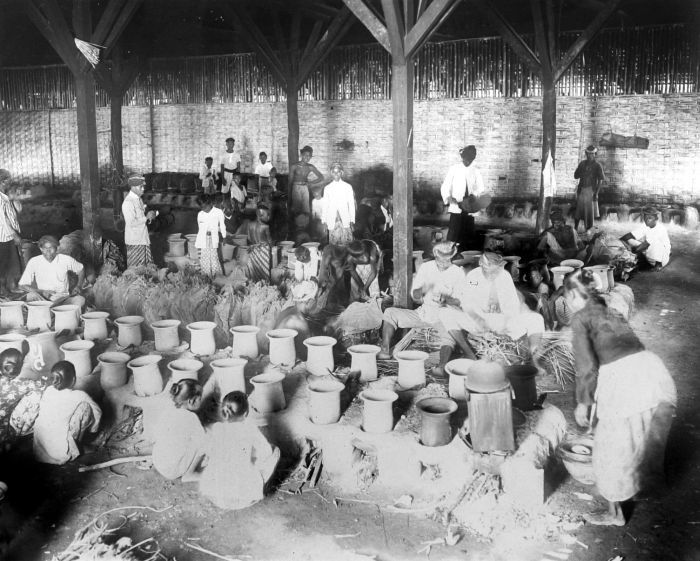
Pindang making in Blimbing, East Java circa 1920s

The term pindang refer to the cooking process of boiling the ingredients in salt together with certain spices that contains tannin, usually soy sauce, shallot skin, guava leaves, teak leaves, tea or other spices common in Southeast Asia. This gives the food a yellowish to brown color and lasts longer compared to plainly boiled fish or eggs, thus pindang is an Indonesian traditional method to preserve food, usually employed for fish and eggs. In Indonesia, ikan pindang (fish pindang) is also known as ikan cue. Both terms are often erroneously used interchangeably, although not all pindang fish are made of cue fish (Caranx sp.).

Pindang is regarded as one of fish preservation method through boiling with salt addition. Although the method is used in other parts of the world, it is only of major commercial significance in Southeast Asia. The shelf life of the products varies from one or two days to several months. The technique is native to Java and Sumatra. In Indonesia, various preserved pindang fish are available in traditional markets. Common fish being processed as pindang are tongkol (mackerel tuna or Euthynnus), bandeng (milkfish), kembung (mackerel or Rastrelliger), lejang (Decapterus), and also kuwe or cue (Caranx sp.).

Pindang preparation is often called the "wet preservation", i.e. after covered in coarse salt, instead of being dried in the sun like salted fish, it is boiled on a low flame until the liquids are evaporated and the salt seasoning absorbed well into fish. Compared to salted fish, pindang uses less salt, thus the taste is not as salty as salted fish. Other preserving methods common in Indonesian cuisine include asin (salted) or cured and dried in salt, and dendeng which is cured and dried in sugar, acar (pickling), and also asap (smoked).

== Variants ==
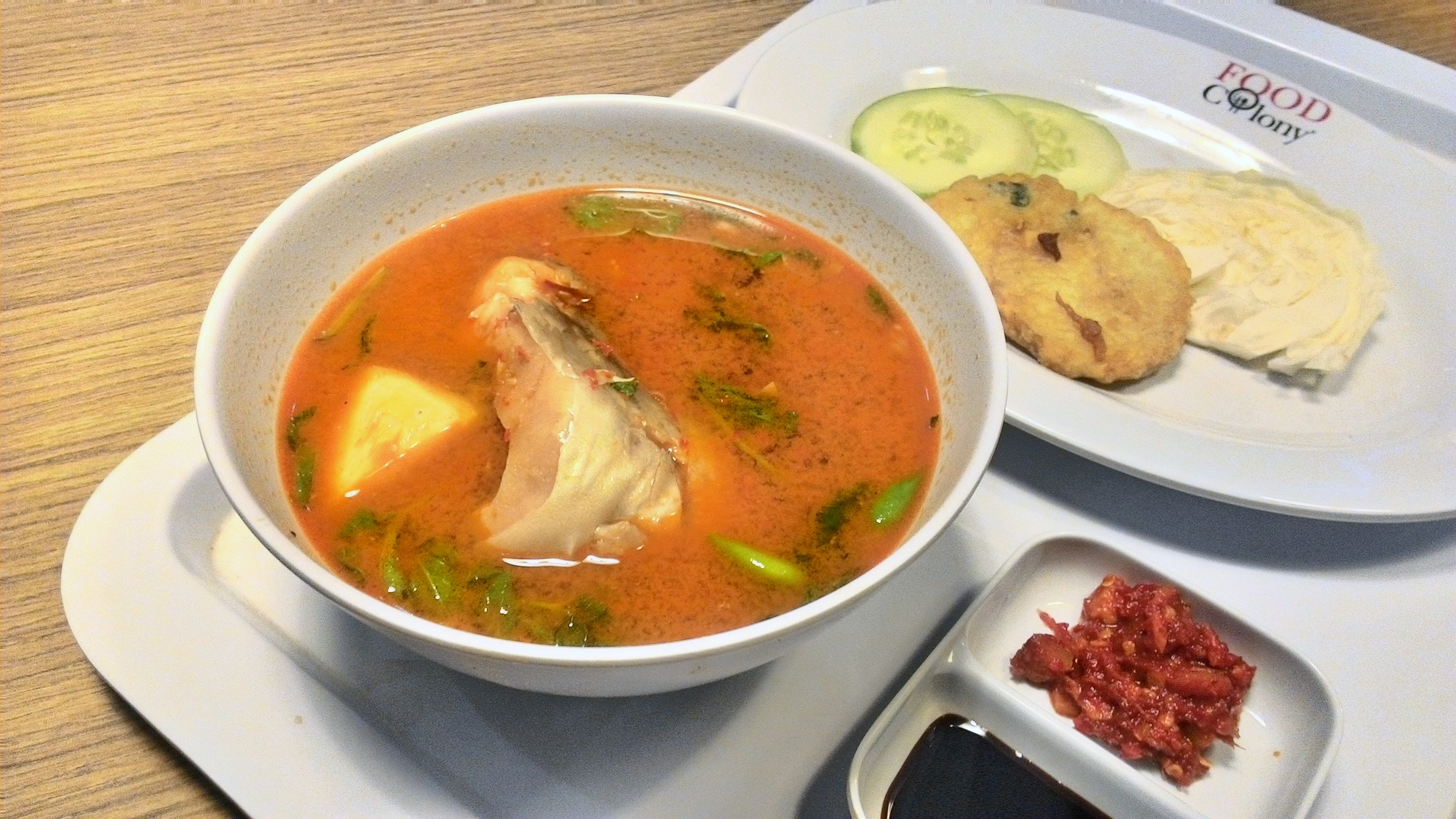
Pindang patin served with tempeh, sambal, and kecap manis, a Palembang dish

Pindang variants can be differentiated according to the kind of fish species used, or according to specific regional recipes which use different ingredients and spices combination. Pindang recipes can be found in various cooking traditions of Southeast Asia; from Javanese, Betawi, Palembang, and Malay cuisine. In Indonesia, pindang recipes show exceptional diversity in South Sumatra.

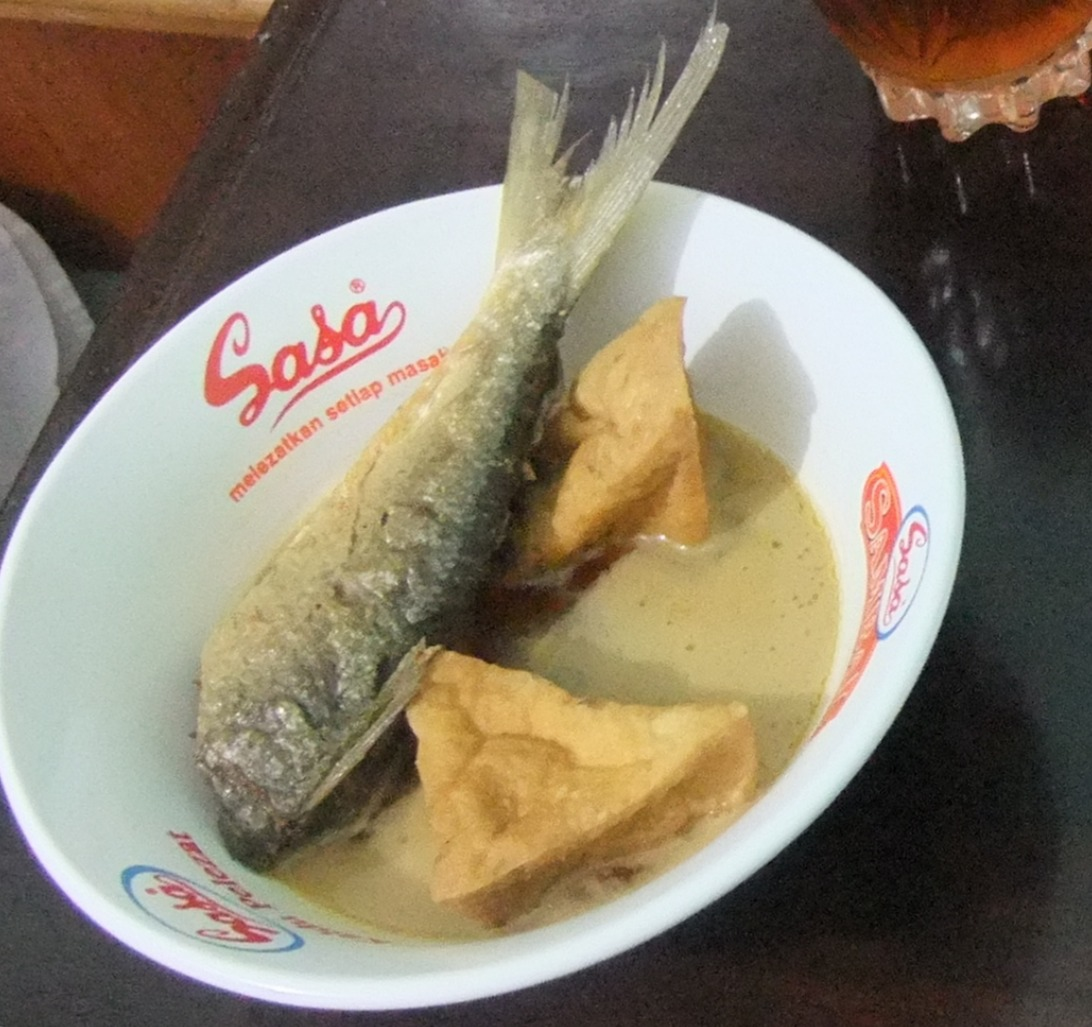
Pindang bandeng, milkfish pindang served in Jepara, Central Java

=== Fish and seafood ===
- Pindang bandeng or pindang serani: Milkfish pindang, specialty of Betawi, Jakarta. The name "serani" is corrupted from nasrani or Christian, which refer to Mardijker of Kampung Tugu in North Jakarta. Pindang serani is also common in Jepara, Central Java, is made from various kinds of seafood, but the most popular one is milkfish.
- Pindang baung: Pindang made of ikan baung (Hemibagrus) specialty of Lampung province, Indonesia.
- Pindang cumi-cumi: Squid pindang, specialty of Bangka Belitung islands.
- Pindang gabus: Snakehead pindang, specialty of South Sumatra.
- Pindang gunung pangandaran: Fish pindang that uses torch ginger, specialty of Pangandaran, West Java, Indonesia.
- Pindang gurame kuning: Gourami pindang in yellowish sauce, this Indonesian pindang has its typical sour, hot and spicy flavour.
- Pindang ikan bunga kecombrang: Fish pindang that uses kecombrang (Etlingera elatior) flower which is quite popular in Indonesia. The pink flower reduce the fishy aroma of the ingredient. It usually uses tengiri (wahoo) fish, but other more common fish such as carp might be used.
- Pindang kakap: Indonesian style red snapper pindang, cooked with pindang method in light yellowish soup containing spices including turmeric, ginger, chili peppers, galangal, lemon basil, lemongrass, and bilimbi.
- Pindang kepala ikan manyung or pindang gombyang: Pindang that uses the head of ikan manyung or ikan jambal (Ariidae). It is commonly found in Indramayu in West Java, Pati and Semarang in Central Java.
- Pindang kerang: Pindang made of mussel, either kerang darah (Tegillarca granosa) or kerang hijau (Perna viridis), another variant from Palembang.
- Pindang kerapu: Grouper pindang served with pineapple.
- Pindang kerupuk: Pindang soup that uses krupuk keriting, fish cracker, specialty of South Sumatra. Using krupuk cracker in soup is quite similar to Sundanese seblak.
- Pindang lampung: Lampung style fish pindang from Lampung province, Sumatra, Indonesia. Fish that usually made into pindang lampung are patin (pangasius), gabus (snakehead), baung (Hemibagrus), and bawal (pomfret). Spices used are red chili pepper, lemongrass, galangal, daun salam (Indonesian bay leaf), citrus leaf, turmeric, shallot and garlic.
- Pindang meranjat: Its soup is generally reddish or brown; the most hot and spicy among South Sumatran pindang variants due to the generous use of red chili pepper, turmeric, and shrimp paste. Traditionally made of iwak salai (smoked fish) from catfish, patin, baung, or lais fish. Specialty of the Meranjat area, southern Ogan Ilir, South Sumatra.
- Pindang musi rawas: Sour and fresh pindang with a rather clear-colored soup, from Musi Rawas, South Sumatra. Uses mashed tomato instead of tamarind as its souring agent, adds ginger and garlic.
- Pindang palembang: Its soup is generally sweet and sour, specialty of Palembang. Pangasius fish is a popular choice for this variant.
- Pindang pegagan: Its soup is lighter than pindang meranjat and not oily, since the spices are boiled directly, and not stir fried in palm oil. Traditionally made of Wallago fish, though other types of fish may also be used based on availability. Specialty of the Pegagan area, northern Ogan Ilir, South Sumatra.
- Pindang sekayu: Sweet tasting fish pindang from Sekayu, Musi Banyuasin, using a sweet soy sauce.
- Pindang telur gabus: Pindang that uses fish roe of gabus, snakehead's egg, specialty of South Sumatra.
- Pindang tongkol: A pindang variant using pindang processed mackerel tuna. Pindang tongkol is quite common across Indonesia; however, it is especially popular in Bangka Belitung islands.
- Pindang udang: A pindang variant that uses shrimp, pineapple and lemon basil, another specialty of Palembang. A similar recipe is also found in Melaka Chetti pindang variant.
- Pindang ikan parang: A Melaka Chetti pindang variant using coconut milk.
- Pindang kerang/sotong: A Perak Malay pindang variant using cockles or squid, a specialty of Lenggong Valley, Perak.
- Pepes pindang tahu kemangi: Shredded pindang fish mixed with tofu and lemon basil, cooked in Indonesian pepes (inside banana leaf wrappings) method.
- Sambal pindang tongkol suwir: Indonesian sambal chili paste mixed and cooked with shredded tongkol (mackerel tuna) that already processed as pindang. This dish can be consumed as side dish with nasi rames or as condiment; i.e. hot and spicy fish relish.

=== Eggs and poultry ===
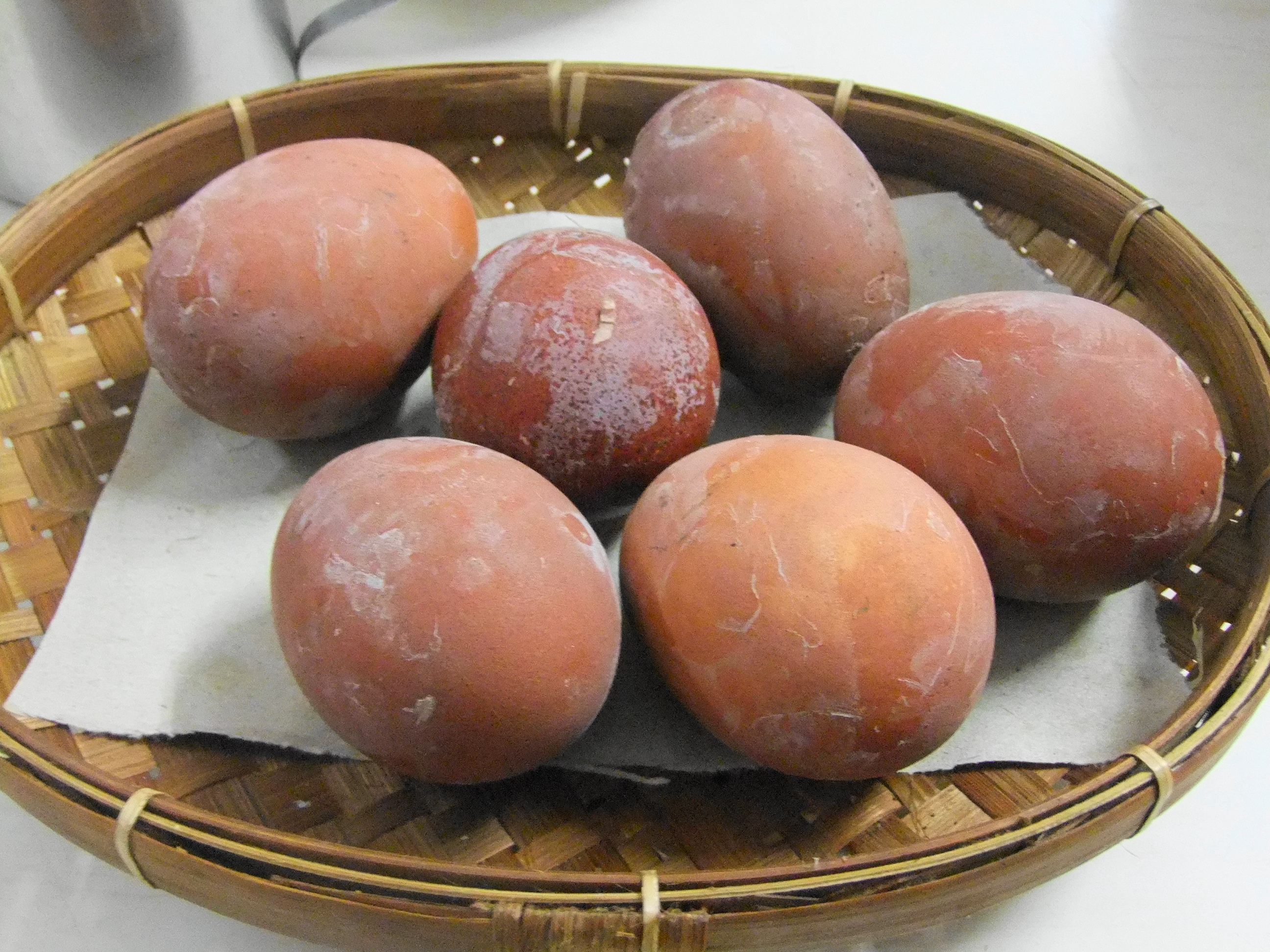
Javanese telur pindang.

- Pindang telur: Eggs cooked using pindang process, widely spread throughout the archipelago, but it is found more prevalent in Javanese cuisine.
- Pindang telur bebek or pindang telur itik: Duck egg pindang, in Indonesia it is considered as a variant of the common pindang telur that mostly uses chicken egg, as both employs same ingredients and cooking method. In Malaysia, it is a pindang variant from Negeri Sembilan using duck egg.
- Pindang hati ayam dan kacang botol: Negeri Sembilan pindang variant using chicken heart and vegetables.
- Pindang kaki ayam or pindang ceker: Chicken feet cooked in pindang method, it uses belimbing wuluh fruit as souring agent.

=== Meat ===
- Nasi pindang semarang or also known as pindang kudus: Beef brisket cooked in pindang method spiced with keluwek and served upon steamed rice, specialty of Semarang and Kudus in Central Java, Indonesia.
- Pindang asam iga kambing: Goat ribs pindang flavoured with asam jawa (tamarind).
- Pindang iga or pindang tulang: Beef ribs pindang or bone pindang, unlike other pindangs that mostly uses fish or eggs, this unique meat pindang is another specialty of Palembang, South Sumatra.
- Pindang kambing: Goat meat pindang found in Indonesia.

=== Vegetables ===
- Pindang kacang panjang: Asparagus bean pindang, although mainly contains vegetables it is usually added with pindang fish or bits of spare meat.
- Pindang rebung santan: Bamboo shoots pindang served in coconut milk.

== See also ==
- Pekasam, a similar fish preservation method of Banjarese and Malay origin
- Asam pedas, a similar dish of Minangkabau and Malay origin
- Tom yum, a similar dish from Thailand
- Sinigang, a similar dish from the Philippines
