= Hemibagrus divaricatus =

Scientific classification
- Domain: Eukaryota
- Kingdom: Animalia
- Phylum: Chordata
- Class: Actinopterygii
- Order: Siluriformes
- Family: Bagridae
- Genus: Hemibagrus
- Species: H. divaricatus

Binomial name
- Hemibagrus divaricatus H. H. Ng & Kottelat, 2013

Species of catfish

Hemibagrus divaricatus is a species of bagrid catfish found in the Perak River drainage in the western Peninsula of Malaysia. This species reaches a length of 30.8 cm (12.1 in).
