= Hemibagrus semotus =

Scientific classification
- Domain: Eukaryota
- Kingdom: Animalia
- Phylum: Chordata
- Class: Actinopterygii
- Order: Siluriformes
- Family: Bagridae
- Genus: Hemibagrus
- Species: H. semotus

Binomial name
- Hemibagrus semotus H. H. Ng & Kottelat, 2013

Species of bagrid catfish

Hemibagrus semotus is a species of bagrid catfish found in the Padas River drainage and the shorter coastal rivers which drain the west face of the Crocker Range in northern Borneo, Sabah, Malaysia. This species reaches a length of 19.9 cm (7.8 in).
