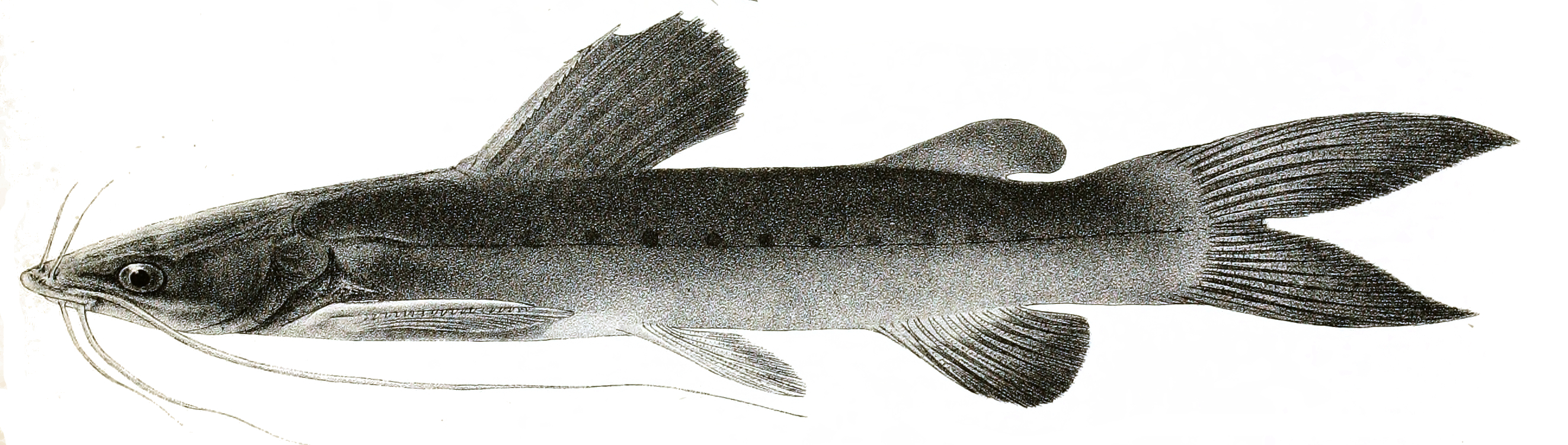

Conservation status
- Critically endangered, possibly extinct (IUCN 3.1)

Scientific classification
- Kingdom: Animalia
- Phylum: Chordata
- Class: Actinopterygii
- Order: Siluriformes
- Family: Bagridae
- Genus: Hemibagrus
- Species: H. punctatus

Binomial name
- Hemibagrus punctatus (Jerdon, 1849)

Synonyms
- Mystus maydelli (non Rössel, 1964); Mystus punctatus (Jerdon, 1849); Macrones punctatus (Jerdon, 1849); Bagrus punctatus Jerdon, 1849

= Hemibagrus punctatus =

Nilgiri mystus

Species of fish

Hemibagrus punctatus, or Nilgiri mystus, is a species of fish in the family Bagridae. It was first described by Jerdon in 1849. It is endemic to east-flowing rivers in the Western Ghats of India. Of these, the species is likely only found in the Kaveri River; records from the Krishna River may actually be of H. maydelli. However, one record from the west-flowing Bharatappuzha River has been tentatively assigned to this species. The last record of this species was in 1998, and it may have experienced a population decline of nearly 100%; thus, IUCN categorizes the species as critically endangered (possibly extinct). It is threatened by habitat degradation by excess siltation, excess fishing, and dam construction. However, based on several specimens caught by fishermen between 2011 and 2012 that likely belong to this species, as well as testimonies from local fishers, moderate populations of this species may still be extant in the region.

No subspecies are listed in the Catalogue of Life.
