= Hyalobagrus leiacanthus =

Scientific classification
- Domain: Eukaryota
- Kingdom: Animalia
- Phylum: Chordata
- Class: Actinopterygii
- Order: Siluriformes
- Family: Bagridae
- Genus: Hyalobagrus
- Species: H. leiacanthus

Binomial name
- Hyalobagrus leiacanthus H. H. Ng & Kottelat, 1998

Species of fish

Hyalobagrus leiacanthus is a species of bagrid catfish endemic to Indonesia where it is known only from the Kapuas River and the Barito River basins in central Borneo.
