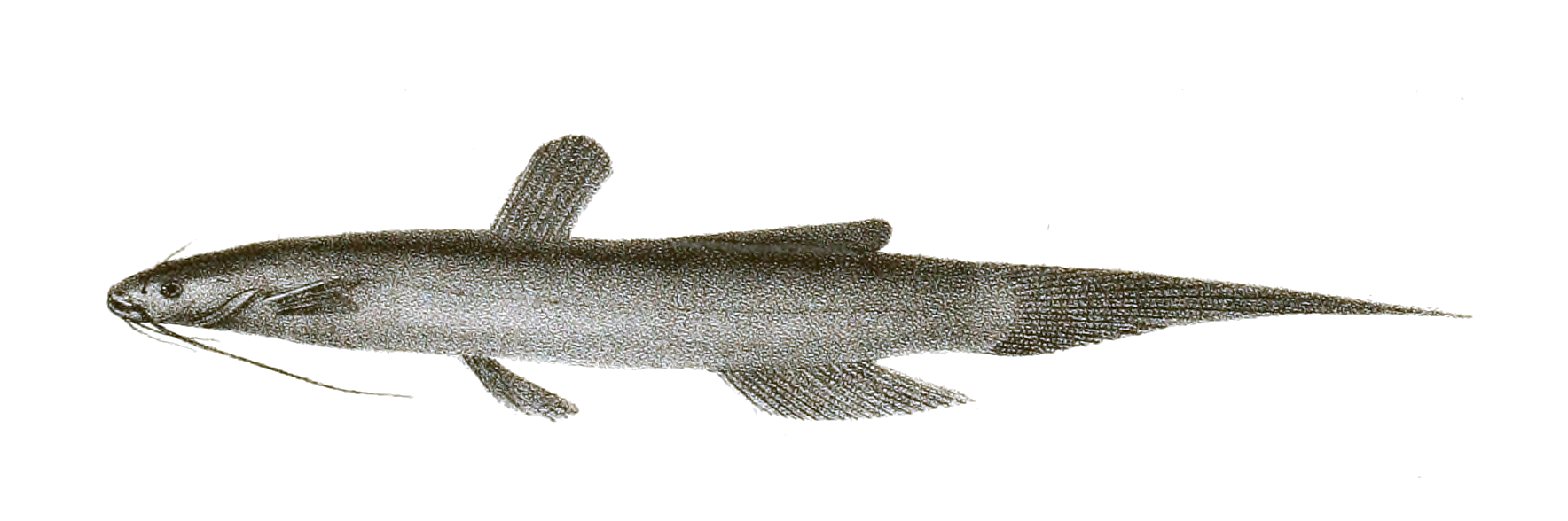

Conservation status
- Data Deficient (IUCN 3.1)

Scientific classification
- Kingdom: Animalia
- Phylum: Chordata
- Class: Actinopterygii
- Order: Siluriformes
- Family: Bagridae
- Genus: Olyra
- Species: O. burmanica

Binomial name
- Olyra burmanica Day, 1872

= Olyra burmanica =

Species of fish

Olyra burmanica is a species of longtail catfish endemic to Myanmar where it is found in Pegu Yomas. This species grows to 11 cm (4.3 in) in total length.
