= Hemibagrus variegatus =

Conservation status
- Data Deficient (IUCN 3.1)

Scientific classification
- Kingdom: Animalia
- Phylum: Chordata
- Class: Actinopterygii
- Division: Teleostei
- Order: Siluriformes
- Family: Bagridae
- Genus: Hemibagrus
- Species: H. variegatus

Binomial name
- Hemibagrus variegatus H. H. Ng & Ferraris, 2000

Species of catfish

Hemibagrus variegatus is a species of bagrid catfish found in Myanmar known only from the Tenasserim river drainage in the south. This species reaches a length of 80 cm (31 in).
