= N. armatus =

N. armatus may refer to:

- Nanobagrus armatus, a catfish species
- Neocirrhitus armatus, a hawkfish species from the Pacific Ocean
- Nymphargus armatus, a frog species endemic to Colombia
