= Olyra kempi =

Conservation status
- Least Concern (IUCN 3.1)

Scientific classification
- Kingdom: Animalia
- Phylum: Chordata
- Class: Actinopterygii
- Order: Siluriformes
- Family: Bagridae
- Genus: Olyra
- Species: O. kempi

Binomial name
- Olyra kempi Chaudhuri, 1912

Species of fish

Olyra kempi is a species of longtail catfish native to Bangladesh and India where it is found in Mangaldai in Assam. This species grows to 14.5 cm (5.7 in) in total length.
