= Hemibagrus furcatus =

Scientific classification
- Kingdom: Animalia
- Phylum: Chordata
- Class: Actinopterygii
- Order: Siluriformes
- Family: Bagridae
- Genus: Hemibagrus
- Species: H. furcatus

Binomial name
- Hemibagrus furcatus H. H. Ng, Martin-Smith & P. K. L. Ng, 2000

Species of fish

Hemibagrus furcatus is a species of bagrid catfish found in Sabah, Malaysia. This species reaches a length of 15 cm (5.9 in).
