= Hemibagrus caveatus =

Conservation status
- Near Threatened (IUCN 3.1)

Scientific classification
- Kingdom: Animalia
- Phylum: Chordata
- Class: Actinopterygii
- Division: Teleostei
- Order: Siluriformes
- Family: Bagridae
- Genus: Hemibagrus
- Species: H. caveatus

Binomial name
- Hemibagrus caveatus H. H. Ng, Wirjoatmodjo & Hadiaty, 2001

Species of bagrid catfish

Hemibagrus caveatus is a species of bagrid catfish found in Indonesia.
