= Hemibagrus chiemhoaensis =

Conservation status
- Data Deficient (IUCN 3.1)

Scientific classification
- Kingdom: Animalia
- Phylum: Chordata
- Class: Actinopterygii
- Division: Teleostei
- Order: Siluriformes
- Family: Bagridae
- Genus: Hemibagrus
- Species: H. chiemhoaensis

Binomial name
- Hemibagrus chiemhoaensis V. H. Nguyễn, 2005

Species of bagrid catfish

Hemibagrus chiemhoaensis is a species of bagrid catfish found in Vietnam.
