= Nanobagrus immaculatus =

Scientific classification
- Kingdom: Animalia
- Phylum: Chordata
- Class: Actinopterygii
- Order: Siluriformes
- Family: Bagridae
- Genus: Nanobagrus
- Species: N. immaculatus

Binomial name
- Nanobagrus immaculatus H. H. Ng, 2008

Species of fish

Nanobagrus immaculatus is a species of bagrid catfish endemic to Indonesia where it is found in the Kahayan River drainage of southern Borneo. It grows to a length of 2.9 cm and has a uniformly dark body with no markings.
