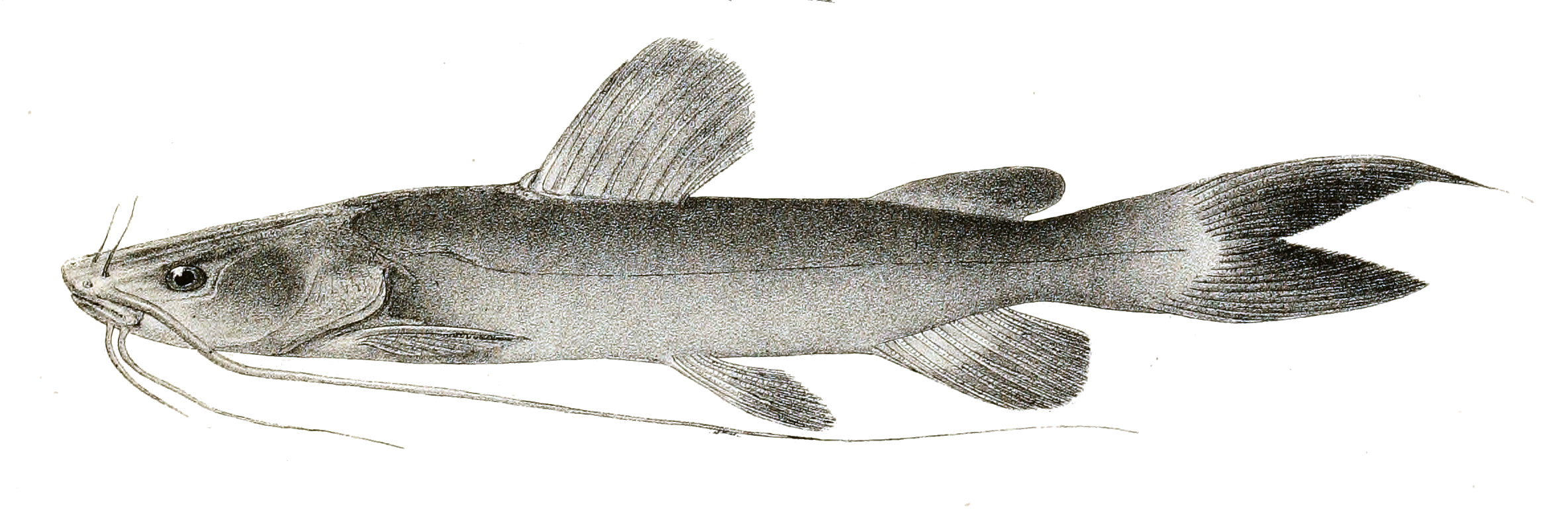

Conservation status
- Least Concern (IUCN 3.1)

Scientific classification
- Kingdom: Animalia
- Phylum: Chordata
- Class: Actinopterygii
- Division: Teleostei
- Order: Siluriformes
- Family: Bagridae
- Genus: Hemibagrus
- Species: H. microphthalmus

Binomial name
- Hemibagrus microphthalmus (Day, 1877)

Synonyms
- Macrones microphthalmus Day, 1877; Mystus microphthalmus (Day, 1877)

= Hemibagrus microphthalmus =

Species of fish

Hemibagrus microphthalmus is a species of catfish found in the Irrawaddy, Sittang and Salween rivers of India, Myanmar and Thailand.

== Culture ==
These catfish are known by fishers in Myanmar as Nga-ywe. They are viewed as nats and are known to tear up fishing nets. They are released back into the water if caught.
