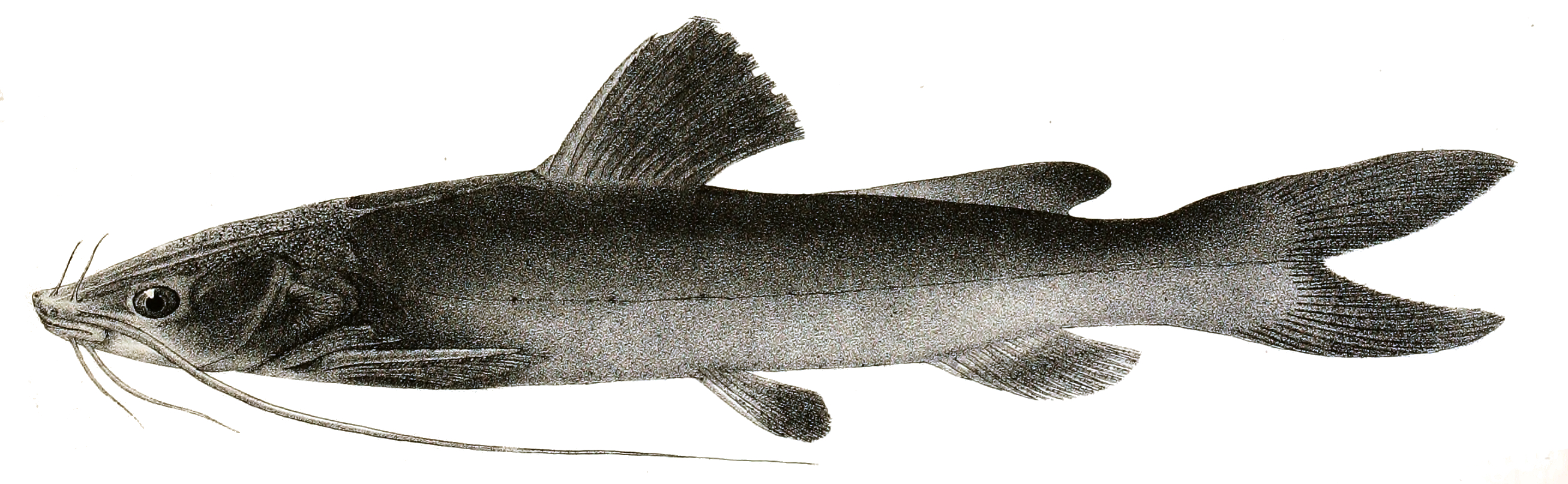

Conservation status
- Least Concern (IUCN 3.1)

Scientific classification
- Domain: Eukaryota
- Kingdom: Animalia
- Phylum: Chordata
- Class: Actinopterygii
- Order: Siluriformes
- Family: Bagridae
- Genus: Hemibagrus
- Species: H. menoda

Binomial name
- Hemibagrus menoda (F. Hamilton, 1822)

Synonyms
- Bagrus corsula; Bagrus trachacanthus; Macrones corsula; Macrones menoda; Macrones trachacanthus; Mystus corsula; Mystus menoda; Mystus menoda menoda; Mystus trachacanthus; Pimelodus menoda

= Hemibagrus menoda =

Species of fish

Hemibagrus menoda, the Menoda catfish, (Bengali: আরওয়ারি, ঘাগলা) is a bagrid catfish found in Bangladesh, and Nepal.
