= Nanobagrus nebulosus =

Scientific classification
- Kingdom: Animalia
- Phylum: Chordata
- Class: Actinopterygii
- Order: Siluriformes
- Family: Bagridae
- Genus: Nanobagrus
- Species: N. nebulosus

Binomial name
- Nanobagrus nebulosus H. H. Ng & H. H. Tan, 1999

Species of fish

Nanobagrus nebulosus is a species of bagrid catfish endemic to Malaysia where it is found in the Endau and Sedili River drainages in the southeastern Malay Peninsula. It grows to a length of 3.5 cm and has a brown body with three rows of cream-colored spots that are found above, along, and below the lateral line.
