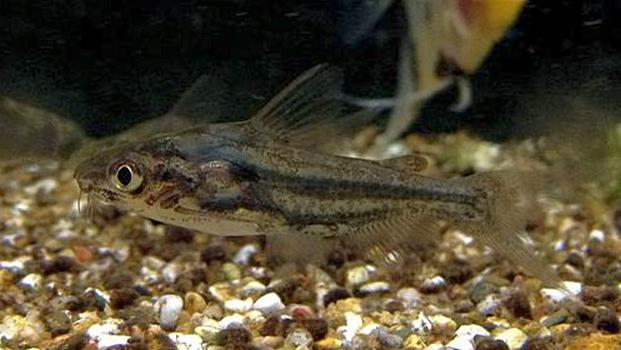

Conservation status
- Least Concern (IUCN 3.1)

Scientific classification
- Kingdom: Animalia
- Phylum: Chordata
- Class: Actinopterygii
- Order: Siluriformes
- Family: Bagridae
- Genus: Rama
- Species: R. chandramara

Binomial name
- Rama chandramara (F. Hamilton, 1822)

Synonyms
- Pimelodus chandramara Hamilton, 1822; Chandramara chandramara (Hamilton, 1822); Pimelodus rama Hamilton, 1822 (misapplied)

= Rama chandramara =

Species of fish

Rama chandramara is a species of catfish in the family Bagridae. It is native to Bangladesh and India. This species reaches about 5 centimetres (2.0 in) SL and inhabits beels, ditches, streams, and canals.

This fish has a semi-transparent body which may or may not have speckles. This fish is a schooling species.
