= Hemibagrus spilopterus =

Conservation status
- Least Concern (IUCN 3.1)

Scientific classification
- Kingdom: Animalia
- Phylum: Chordata
- Class: Actinopterygii
- Division: Teleostei
- Order: Siluriformes
- Family: Bagridae
- Genus: Hemibagrus
- Species: H. spilopterus

Binomial name
- Hemibagrus spilopterus H. H. Ng & Rainboth, 1999

Species of bagrid catfish

Hemibagrus spilopterus is a species of bagrid catfish from Cambodia, is only known from the lower Mekong. This species reaches a length of 5 cm (2.0 in).
