= Hemibagrus baramensis =

Scientific classification
- Domain: Eukaryota
- Kingdom: Animalia
- Phylum: Chordata
- Class: Actinopterygii
- Order: Siluriformes
- Family: Bagridae
- Genus: Hemibagrus
- Species: H. baramensis

Binomial name
- Hemibagrus baramensis (Regan, 1906)

Synonyms
- Macrones baramensis Regan, 1906 Mystus baramensis (Regan, 1906)

Species of bagrid catfish

Hemibagrus baramensis is a species of bagrid catfish found in northern Borneo. This species reaches a length of 24 cm (9.4 in).
