= Nanobagrus stellatus =

Scientific classification
- Kingdom: Animalia
- Phylum: Chordata
- Class: Actinopterygii
- Order: Siluriformes
- Family: Bagridae
- Genus: Nanobagrus
- Species: N. stellatus

Binomial name
- Nanobagrus stellatus H. H. Tan & H. H. Ng, 2000

Species of fish

Nanobagrus stellatus is a species of bagrid catfish endemic to Indonesia where it is found in the Batang Hari basin of Sumatra. It grows to a length of 3.4 cm and is colored brown with three rows of cream-colored spots that are located above, along and below the lateral line.
