= Ramarama =

Ramarama may refer to:

- Ramarama, New Zealand, a community in the Auckland region of New Zealand
- Lophomyrtus bullata, also known as ramarama, a plant native to New Zealand
- Ramarama language, a language of Brazil

== See also ==
- Rama rama, a species of fish
- Rama Rama, part of the Hare Krishna mantra
