= Hemibagrus imbrifer =

Conservation status
- Data Deficient (IUCN 3.1)

Scientific classification
- Kingdom: Animalia
- Phylum: Chordata
- Class: Actinopterygii
- Division: Teleostei
- Order: Siluriformes
- Family: Bagridae
- Genus: Hemibagrus
- Species: H. imbrifer

Binomial name
- Hemibagrus imbrifer H. H. Ng & Ferraris, 2000

Species of bagrid catfish

Hemibagrus imbrifer is a species of bagrid catfish found in the Salween river drainage. This species reaches a length of 18.7 cm (7.4 in).
