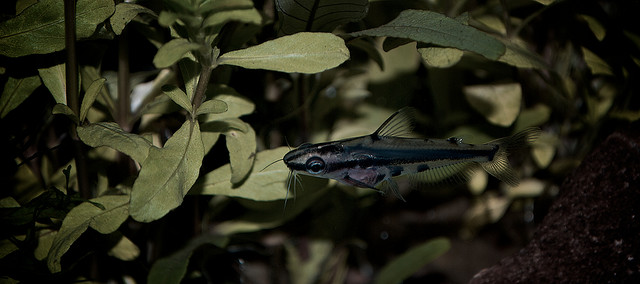

Conservation status
- Critically endangered, possibly extinct (IUCN 3.1)

Scientific classification
- Kingdom: Animalia
- Phylum: Chordata
- Class: Actinopterygii
- Order: Siluriformes
- Family: Bagridae
- Genus: Hyalobagrus
- Species: H. ornatus

Binomial name
- Hyalobagrus ornatus (Duncker, 1904)

Synonyms
- Pseudobagrus ornatus Duncker, 1904; Pelteobagrus ornatus (Duncker, 1904)

= Hyalobagrus ornatus =

Species of fish

Hyalobagrus ornatus is a species of bagrid catfish found in Indonesia, Malaysia and Thailand. It is found in the Muar River drainage in the southern Malay Peninsula of Malaysia and Thailand and Kapuas basin in western Borneo. It occurs in streams and peat swamps.
