= Hemibagrus taybacensis =

Scientific classification
- Domain: Eukaryota
- Kingdom: Animalia
- Phylum: Chordata
- Class: Actinopterygii
- Order: Siluriformes
- Family: Bagridae
- Genus: Hemibagrus
- Species: H. taybacensis

Binomial name
- Hemibagrus taybacensis V. H. Nguyễn, 2005

Species of bagrid catfish

Hemibagrus taybacensis is a species of bagrid catfish found in Vietnam.
