= Olyra horae =

Conservation status
- Data Deficient (IUCN 3.1)

Scientific classification
- Kingdom: Animalia
- Phylum: Chordata
- Class: Actinopterygii
- Order: Siluriformes
- Family: Bagridae
- Genus: Olyra
- Species: O. horae

Binomial name
- Olyra horae (Prashad & Mukerji, 1929)

Synonyms
- Amblyceps horae Prashad & Mukerji, 1929

Species of fish

Olyra horae is a species of long tailed catfish native to India where it occurs in Meghalaya and Myanmar where it is found in Indawgyi Lake. This species grows to 7 cm (2.8 in) in total length.
