= Hyalobagrus flavus =

Scientific classification
- Domain: Eukaryota
- Kingdom: Animalia
- Phylum: Chordata
- Class: Actinopterygii
- Order: Siluriformes
- Family: Bagridae
- Genus: Hyalobagrus
- Species: H. flavus

Binomial name
- Hyalobagrus flavus H. H. Ng & Kottelat, 1998

Species of fish

Hyalobagrus flavus is a species of bagrid catfish endemic to Indonesia where it is known only from the Batang Hari drainage in Sumatra and the Mentaya River basin in southern Borneo where it inhabits brown water habitats that are closely associated with blackwater peat swamps. They occur in large shoals, sometimes mixed with other species of shoaling catfish such as Pseudeutropius brachypopterus and P. moolengurghae.
