= Hemibagrus lacustrinus =

Scientific classification
- Kingdom: Animalia
- Phylum: Chordata
- Class: Actinopterygii
- Order: Siluriformes
- Family: Bagridae
- Genus: Hemibagrus
- Species: H. lacustrinus

Binomial name
- Hemibagrus lacustrinus H. H. Ng & Kottelat, 2013

Species of bagrid catfish

Hemibagrus lacustrinus is a species of bagrid catfish found in Sumatra, Indonesia in the Danau Singkarak and upper Ombilin River. This species reaches a length of 22.3 cm (8.8 in).
