= Hemibagrus chrysops =

Scientific classification
- Domain: Eukaryota
- Kingdom: Animalia
- Phylum: Chordata
- Class: Actinopterygii
- Order: Siluriformes
- Family: Bagridae
- Genus: Hemibagrus
- Species: H. chrysops

Binomial name
- Hemibagrus chrysops H. H. Ng & Dodson, 1999

Species of bagrid catfish

Hemibagrus chrysops is a species of bagrid catfish found in Malaysia.
