= Nanobagrus =

Scientific classification
- Kingdom: Animalia
- Phylum: Chordata
- Class: Actinopterygii
- Order: Siluriformes
- Family: Bagridae
- Genus: Nanobagrus; T. P. Mo, 1991

Type species
- Akysis armatus Vaillant, 1902

Genus of fishes

Nanobagrus is a genus of bagrid catfishes found in Southeast Asia. All species are quite small fish.

== Species ==
There are currently seven described species in this genus:

- Nanobagrus armatus (Vaillant, 1902)
- Nanobagrus fuscus (Popta, 1904)
- Nanobagrus immaculatus H. H. Ng, 2008
- Nanobagrus lemniscatus H. H. Ng, 2010.
- Nanobagrus nebulosus H. H. Ng & H. H. Tan, 1999
- Nanobagrus stellatus H. H. Tan & H. H. Ng, 2000
- Nanobagrus torquatus A. W. Thomson, J. A. López, Hadiaty & Page, 2008
