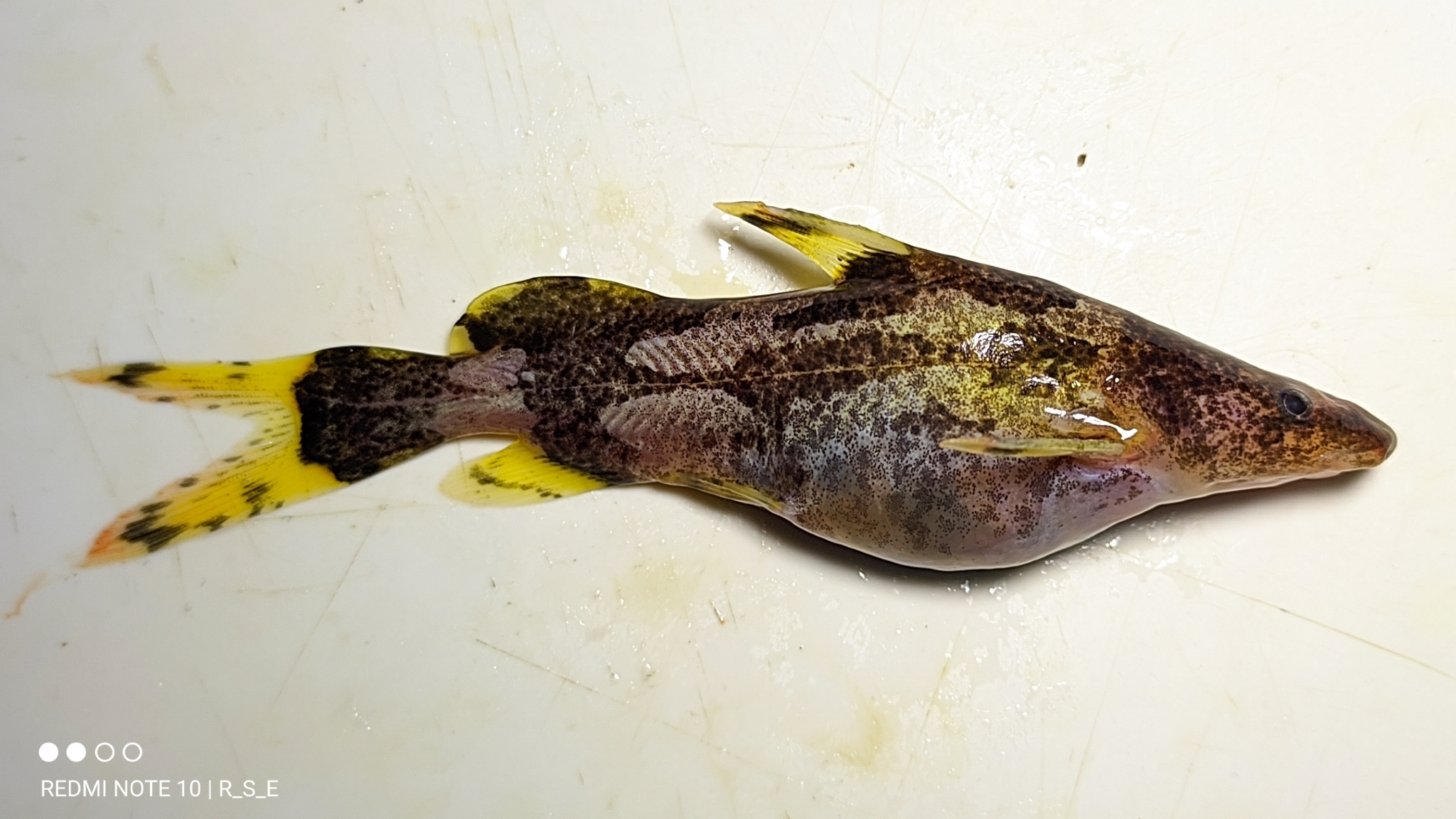
- Leiocassis bekantan

Scientific classification
- Kingdom: Animalia
- Phylum: Chordata
- Class: Actinopterygii
- Order: Siluriformes
- Family: Bagridae
- Genus: Leiocassis; Bleeker, 1857

Type species
- Bagrus micropogon Bleeker, 1852

Synonyms
- Liocassis Günther, 1864 (lapsus); Liocassus Herre, 1934 (lapsus)

= Leiocassis =

Genus of fishes

Leiocassis is a genus of bagrid catfishes found mostly in Southeast Asia with some species occurring in China.

The members of Leiocassis have an elongate narrow head and a prominently protruding snout.

== Species ==
This genus has a confused taxonomy and there is uncertainty surrounding the number of valid species. Certain East Asian bagrids formerly placed in this genus have been moved to Tachysurus. In 2006, Heok Hee Ng considered the genus Leiocassis to be restricted to Sundaic Southeast Asia and Borneo and only a handful of species as valid (L. aculeata, L. collina, L. hosii, L. micropogon, L. poeciloptera, and L. tenebrica).

There are currently 7 recognized species in this genus:

- Leiocassis aculeata H. H. Ng & Hadiaty, 2005
- Leiocassis bekantan H. H. Ng & H. H. Tan, 2018
- Leiocassis collina H. H. Ng & K. K. P. Lim, 2006
- Leiocassis micropogon (Bleeker, 1852)
- Leiocassis poeciloptera (Valenciennes, 1840)
- Leiocassis rudicula H. H. Ng & Hadiaty, 2019
- Leiocassis tenebrica H. H. Ng & K. K. P. Lim, 2006

As of August 2025, both FishBase and WoRMS list 14 species.
