= Nanobagrus armatus =

Scientific classification
- Domain: Eukaryota
- Kingdom: Animalia
- Phylum: Chordata
- Class: Actinopterygii
- Order: Siluriformes
- Family: Bagridae
- Genus: Nanobagrus
- Species: N. armatus

Binomial name
- Nanobagrus armatus (Vaillant, 1902)

Synonyms
- Akysis armatus Vaillant, 1902; Leiocassis armatus (Vaillant, 1902)

Species of fish

Nanobagrus armatus is a species of bagrid catfish found in the Mahakam and Kapuas River basins of Borneo.

This species grows to a length of 3.2 cm and has a brown body with numerous cream-colored spots and 2 relatively large and irregular cream-colored patches on the sides of the body.
