= Hemileiocassis panjang =

Conservation status
- Critically endangered, possibly extinct (IUCN 3.1)

Scientific classification
- Kingdom: Animalia
- Phylum: Chordata
- Class: Actinopterygii
- Order: Siluriformes
- Family: Bagridae
- Genus: Hemileiocassis; H. H. Ng & K. K. P. Lim, 2000
- Species: H. panjang

Binomial name
- Hemileiocassis panjang H. H. Ng & K. K. P. Lim, 2000

Species of fish

Hemileiocassis panjang is a species of bagrid catfish endemic to Indonesia. It grows to a length of 13.9 cm. It is the only member of its genus.
