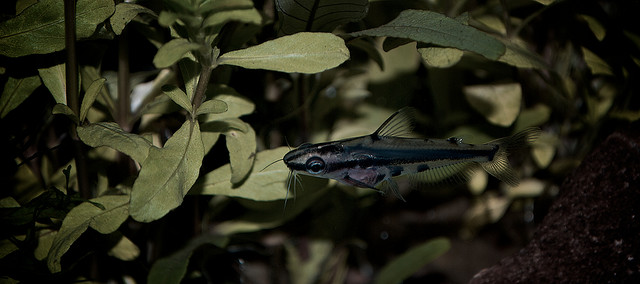
- Hyalobagrus ornatus

Scientific classification
- Kingdom: Animalia
- Phylum: Chordata
- Class: Actinopterygii
- Order: Siluriformes
- Family: Bagridae
- Genus: Hyalobagrus; H. H. Ng & Kottelat, 1998

Type species
- Pseudobagrus ornatus Duncker 1904

= Hyalobagrus =

Genus of fishes

Hyalobagrus is a genus of bagrid catfishes found in Southeast Asia.

== Species ==
There are currently three recognized species in this genus:

- Hyalobagrus flavus H. H. Ng & Kottelat, 1998 (Shadow catfish)
- Hyalobagrus leiacanthus H. H. Ng & Kottelat, 1998
- Hyalobagrus ornatus (Duncker, 1904)

== Distribution ==
Hyalobagrus species are distributed in Asia.

== Description ==
These catfish species are small and transparent. The three species can be distinguished by differences in body shape, coloration, and the degree of serrations on the anterior edge of the pectoral fin spine. The three species range from about 3–4.4 centimetres (1.2–1.7 in) SL.

Hyalobagrus species are sexually dimorphic, males possess a genital papilla, and gravid females are easy to spot since their blue-green eggs are visible through their bellies.

== Ecology ==
These catfish are mid-water swimmers. They are also schooling fish. In their natural habitat, they are almost always found closely associated with submerged vegetation.

== In the aquarium ==
H. flavus and H. ornatus are known to be exported for the aquarium trade. H. flavus first appeared in the hobby in the 1980s. They seem to do best in a heavily planted tank with tankmates that will not out compete them for food. They are a peaceful, diurnal community species that accept all kinds of foods. None of these species have been bred in captivity.
