= Rhinobagrus =

Scientific classification
- Kingdom: Animalia
- Phylum: Chordata
- Class: Actinopterygii
- Division: Teleostei
- Order: Siluriformes
- Family: Bagridae
- Genus: Rhinobagrus; Bleeker, 1864

Type species
- Rhinobagrus dumerili Bleeker, 1864

Synonyms
- Adelopeltis Dabry de Thiersant, 1872; Dermocassis (subgenus of Leiocassis) Nichols, 1925; Nasocassis (subgenus of Leiocassis) Nichols, 1925

Genus of fishes

Rhinobagrus is a genus of bagrid catfishes found in eastern Asia. The generic name alludes to the extended snout of the type species, from the Greek word rhinós.

== Species ==
The currently recognized species in this genus are:

- Rhinobagrus brevirostris (Nguyễn, 2006)
- Rhinobagrus dumerili Bleeker, 1846 - Chinese longsnout catfish
- Rhinobagrus fangi (Wu, 1930)
- Rhinobagrus kyphus (Đ. Y. Mai, 1978)
- Rhinobagrus longispinalis (Nguyễn, 2006)
- Rhinobagrus ussuriensis (Dybowski, 1872) - Ussuri catfish
