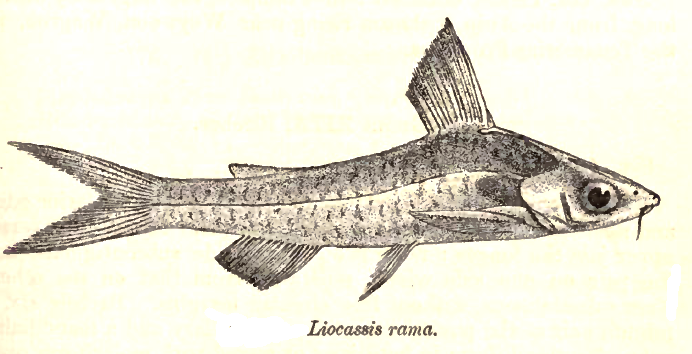
- Illustration by Francis Day

Scientific classification
- Kingdom: Animalia
- Phylum: Chordata
- Class: Actinopterygii
- Division: Teleostei
- Order: Siluriformes
- Family: Bagridae
- Genus: Rama; Bleeker, 1858
- Species: R. rama

Binomial name
- Rama rama (F. Hamilton, 1822)

Synonyms
- Leiocassis rama (Hamilton, 1822); Pimelodus rama Hamilton, 1822; Rama buchanani Bleeker, 1863

= Rama rama =

Species of fish

Rama rama is a species of bagrid catfish endemic to India where it is found in the Brahmaputra River basin.
