= Sundolyra latebrosa =

Conservation status
- Endangered (IUCN 3.1)

Scientific classification
- Kingdom: Animalia
- Phylum: Chordata
- Class: Actinopterygii
- Order: Siluriformes
- Family: Bagridae
- Genus: Sundolyra; H. H. Ng, Hadiaty, Lundberg & Luckenbill, 2015
- Species: S. latebrosa

Binomial name
- Sundolyra latebrosa H. H. Ng, Hadiaty, Lundberg & Luckenbill, 2015

Species of fish

Sundolyra latebrosa is a species of catfish found in Sumatra. This species occurs the Kreung Babah Rot drainage in northwestern Sumatra. This species is the only known member of its genus.
