= Rama (fish) =

Scientific classification
- Kingdom: Animalia
- Phylum: Chordata
- Class: Actinopterygii
- Division: Teleostei
- Order: Siluriformes
- Family: Bagridae
- Genus: Rama; Bleeker, 1858

Genus of fish

Rama is a genus of bagrid catfish native to India.

== Taxonomy ==
According to the Catalog of Fishes, two species are recognized:

- Rama chandramara (Hamilton, 1822)
- Rama rama (Hamilton, 1822)

Some authorities list R. chandramara as Chandramara chandramara, making both genera monotypic.
