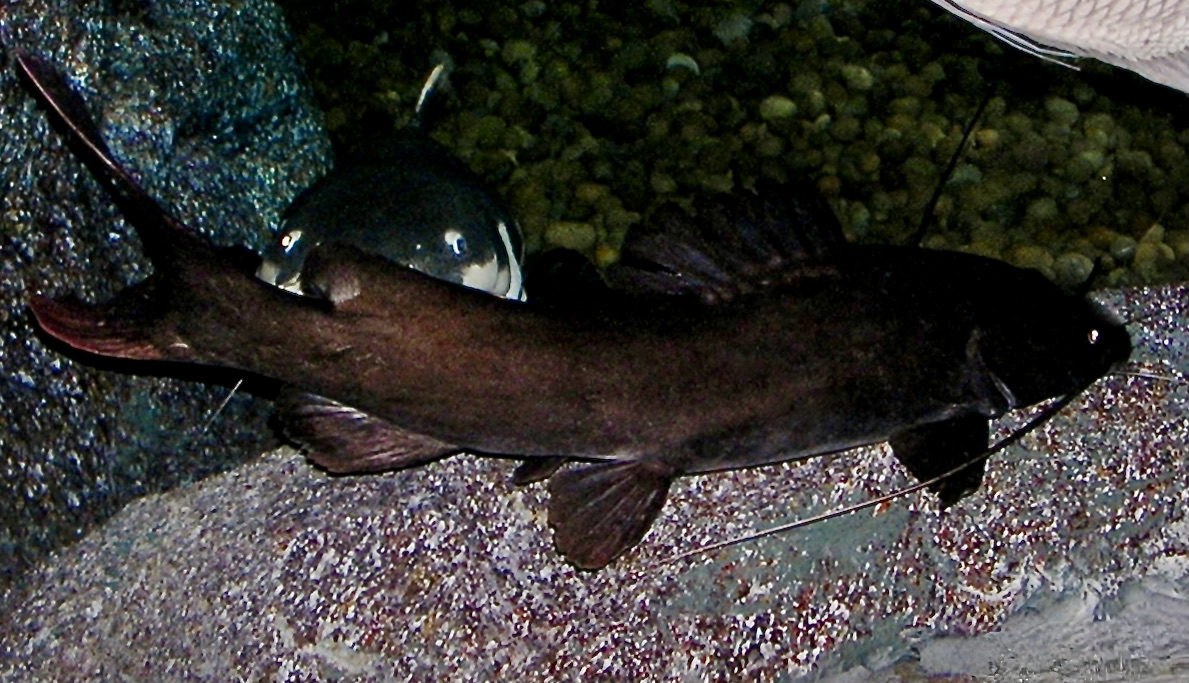

Conservation status
- Data Deficient (IUCN 3.1)

Scientific classification
- Kingdom: Animalia
- Phylum: Chordata
- Class: Actinopterygii
- Order: Siluriformes
- Family: Bagridae
- Genus: Hemibagrus
- Species: H. filamentus

Binomial name
- Hemibagrus filamentus (Fang and Chaux, 1949)

Synonyms
- Macrones filamentus Fang & Chaux, 1949; Mystus filamentus (Fang & Chaux, 1949)

= Hemibagrus filamentus =

Species of fish

Hemibagrus filamentus is a species of catfish endemic to Cambodia, Laos and Thailand, known only from Mekong River. It is found in still waters and moving waters although it also been found in large rivers. It feeds on fishes, crustaceans, aquatic insect larvae and plant material. When migrating, it moves into smaller tributaries and in flooded areas with rising water level; they spawn from June to July. It is listed as a junior synonym of H. nemurus and research is often confused with H. nemurus. It is fished for food by small-scale commercial fisheries but exact threats are unknown and nothing else is known about this fish thus the Data Deficient listing.
