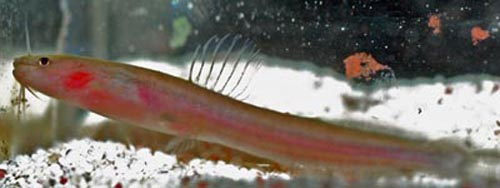

Conservation status
- Least Concern (IUCN 3.1)

Scientific classification
- Kingdom: Animalia
- Phylum: Chordata
- Class: Actinopterygii
- Order: Siluriformes
- Family: Bagridae
- Genus: Olyra
- Species: O. longicaudata

Binomial name
- Olyra longicaudata McClelland, 1842

= Olyra longicaudata =

Species of fish

Olyra longicaudata is a species of longtail catfish native to India where it occurs in Darjelling Himalaya in Assam, and Myanmar, where it occurs in Tenassarim. This species grows to a length of 11 cm (4.3 in) in standard length.
