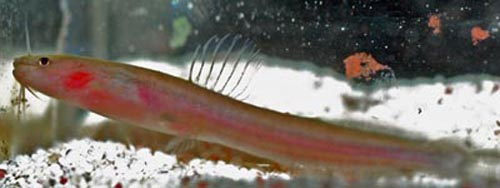
- Olyra longicaudata

Scientific classification
- Kingdom: Animalia
- Phylum: Chordata
- Class: Actinopterygii
- Order: Siluriformes
- Family: Bagridae
- Genus: Olyra; McClelland, 1842

Type species
- Olyra longicaudatus McClelland, 1842

= Olyra (fish) =

Genus of fishes

Olyra is a genus of catfishes of the family Bagridae. This genus occurs throughout South Asia and western Indochina, from India to western Thailand.

In Asia, Olyra species are known as fighting catfish; they are placed in small aquaria to battle one another similar to Siamese fighting fish, and money is bet on the outcome.

== Taxonomy ==
The genus Olyra is considered by some authorities to belong to the family Bagridae, though Olyridae is considered valid by Fishbase. The taxonomic status of O. colletii has been a puzzle. It was first described in 1881 by Franz Steindachner as Heptapterus collettii and marked as neotropical in origin. With examination, though, it was determined to more closely match members of Olyra. It may even be a junior synonym of Olyra longicaudata. O. kempi is treated in some literature as a synonym of O. longicaudata.

== Species ==
There are currently 8 recognized species in this genus:

- Olyra astrifera Arunachalam, Raja, Mayden & Chandran, 2013
- Olyra burmanica F. Day, 1872 (Long-tail catfish)
- Olyra collettii (Steindachner, 1881)
- Olyra horae (Prashad & Mukerji, 1929)
- Olyra kempi Chaudhuri, 1912
- Olyra longicaudata McClelland, 1842
- Olyra praestigiosa H. H. Ng & Ferraris, 2016
- Olyra saginata H. H. Ng, Lalramliana & Lalthanzara, 2014
