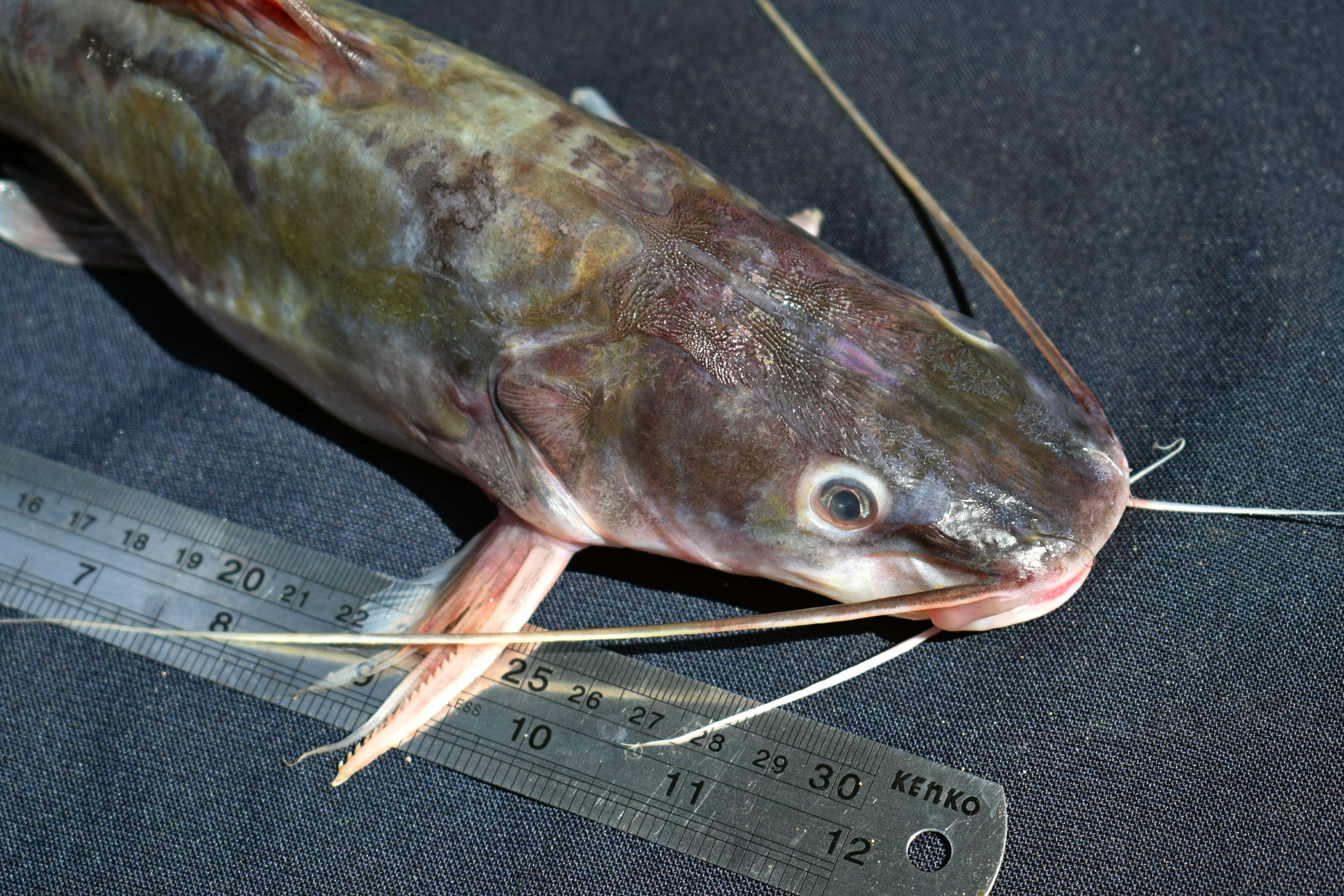
- Hemibagrus nemurus from Cihideung, Bogor, Indonesia

Conservation status
- Least Concern (IUCN 3.1)

Scientific classification
- Kingdom: Animalia
- Phylum: Chordata
- Class: Actinopterygii
- Order: Siluriformes
- Family: Bagridae
- Genus: Hemibagrus
- Species: H. nemurus

Binomial name
- Hemibagrus nemurus (Valenciennes, 1840)

= Hemibagrus nemurus =

Species of fish

Hemibagrus nemurus is a species of catfishes in the family Bagridae. After a major review by Ng and Kottelat (2013), its distribution is believed to be confined (endemic) to Java. It is found in Sumatra in the Bukit Tigapuluh National Park in 2016, too. These catfish are found in Malaysia, Indonesia (Java, Sumatra, Borneo) and Thailand.

== In human culture ==
They are common food fish in Malaysia and Indonesia, where they are either steamed or cooked in curry.
