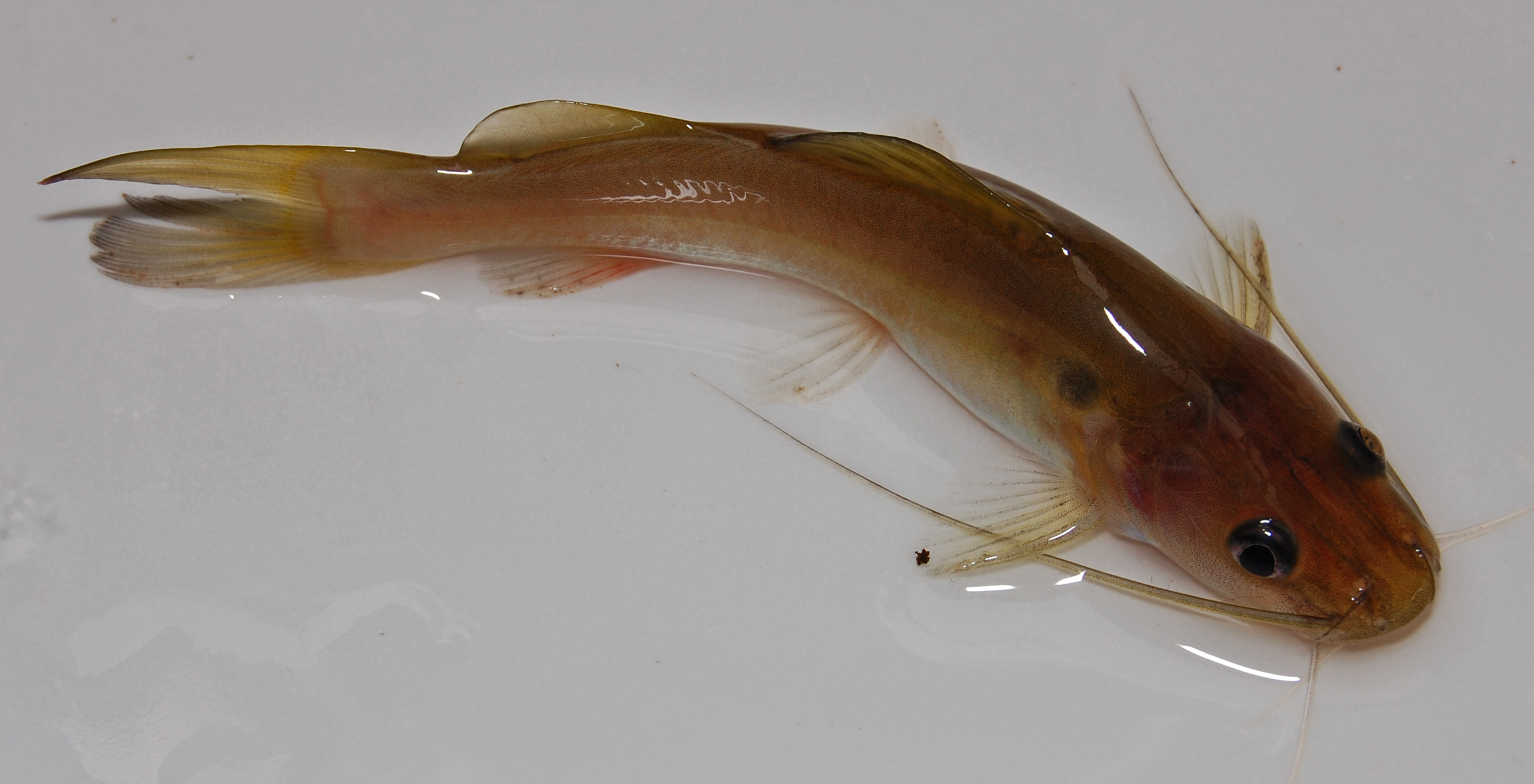
- Hemibagrus planiceps

Scientific classification
- Kingdom: Animalia
- Phylum: Chordata
- Class: Actinopterygii
- Division: Teleostei
- Order: Siluriformes
- Family: Bagridae
- Genus: Hemibagrus; Bleeker, 1862

Type species
- Bagrus nemurus Valenciennes, 1840

Species
- see text below

Synonyms
- Macropterobagrus Nichols, 1925; Brachymystus Fowler, 1937

= Hemibagrus =

Hemibagrus Temporal range: Late Miocene–Recent

Genus of fishes

Hemibagrus is a genus of catfishes (order Siluriformes) of the family Bagridae.

The genus Hemibagrus is known from Southeast Asia, India, and southern China. Members of this genus are found ubiquitously in river drainages east of the Ganges-Brahmaputra basin and south of the Yangtze basin, and reach their greatest diversity in Sundaland.

This genus consists of large-sized catfishes. H. wyckioides is the largest Bagrid catfish in central Indochina and may reach 80 kilograms. It includes species with depressed (flattened) heads, rugose (ridged or wrinkled) head shields not covered by skin, and moderately long adipose fins.

In Southeast Asia, Hemibagrus species are an important source of animal protein.

The extinct species, H. major, is a fossil species from a Miocene lake fauna from what is now Ban Nong Pia, Phetchabun Province of Thailand.

== Species ==
There are currently 33 recognized species in this genus:

- Hemibagrus baramensis (Regan, 1906)
- Hemibagrus bongan (Popta, 1904)
- Hemibagrus capitulum (Popta, 1906)
- Hemibagrus caveatus H. H. Ng, Wirjoatmodjo & Hadiaty, 2001
- Hemibagrus centralus Đ. Y. Mai, 1978
- Hemibagrus chiemhoaensis V. H. Nguyễn, 2005
- Hemibagrus divaricatus H. H. Ng & Kottelat, 2013
- Hemibagrus filamentus (P. W. Fang & Chaux, 1949)
- Hemibagrus fortis (Popta, 1904)
- Hemibagrus gracilis P. K. L. Ng & H. H. Ng, 1995
- Hemibagrus guttatus (Lacépède, 1803)
- Hemibagrus hainanensis (T. L. Tchang, 1935)
- Hemibagrus hoevenii (Bleeker, 1846)
- Hemibagrus imbrifer H. H. Ng & Ferraris, 2000
- Hemibagrus lacustrinus H. H. Ng & Kottelat, 2013
- Hemibagrus macropterus Bleeker, 1870
- Hemibagrus maydelli (Rössel, 1964)
- Hemibagrus menoda (F. Hamilton, 1822) (Menoda catfish)
- Hemibagrus microphthalmus (F. Day, 1877)
- Hemibagrus nemurus (Valenciennes, 1840) (Yellow catfish)
- Hemibagrus olyroides (T. R. Roberts, 1989)
- Hemibagrus peguensis (Boulenger, 1894)
- Hemibagrus planiceps (Valenciennes, 1840)
- Hemibagrus pluriradiatus (Vaillant, 1892)
- Hemibagrus punctatus (Jerdon, 1849)
- Hemibagrus sabanus (Inger & P. K. Chin, 1959)
- Hemibagrus semotus H. H. Ng & Kottelat, 2013
- Hemibagrus spilopterus H. H. Ng & Rainboth, 1999
- Hemibagrus variegatus H. H. Ng & Ferraris, 2000
- Hemibagrus velox H. H. Tan & H. H. Ng, 2000
- Hemibagrus vietnamicus Đ. Y. Mai, 1978
- Hemibagrus wyckii (Bleeker, 1858)
- Hemibagrus wyckioides (P. W. Fang & Chaux, 1949)

Synonyms

- Hemibagrus amemiyai (Sh. Kimura, 1934); valid as H. macropterus
- Hemibagrus camthuyensis V. H. Nguyễn, 2005; valid as H. vietnamicus
- Hemibagrus chrysops H. H. Ng & Dodson, 1999; valid as H. capitulum
- Hemibagrus dongbacensis V. H. Nguyễn, 2005; valid as H. guttatus
- Hemibagrus furcatus H. H. Ng, Martin-Smith & P. K. L. Ng, 2000; valid as H. baramensis
- Hemibagrus hongus Đ. Y. Mai, 1978; valid as H. guttatus
- Hemibagrus johorensis (Herre, 1940); valid as H. capitulum
- Hemibagrus songdaensis V. H. Nguyễn, 2005; valid as H. pluriradiatus
- Hemibagrus taybacensis V. H. Nguyễn, 2005; valid as H. pluriradiatus
