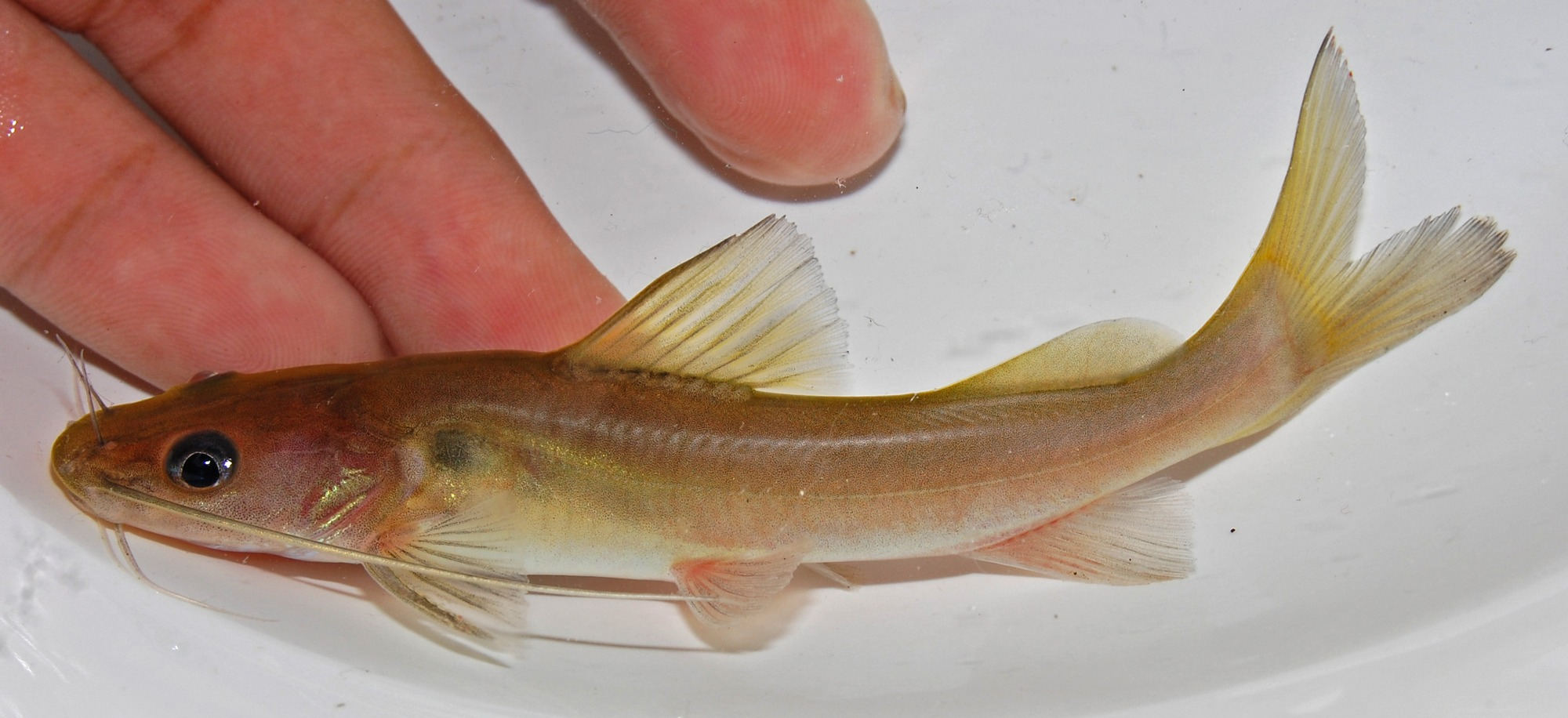
- Hemibagrus planiceps

Scientific classification
- Kingdom: Animalia
- Phylum: Chordata
- Class: Actinopterygii
- Division: Teleostei
- Order: Siluriformes
- Superfamily: Bagroidea
- Family: Bagridae; Bleeker, 1858

Genera
- Extant genera; Bagrichthys; Bagroides; Bagrus; Batasio; Hemibagrus; Hemileiocassis; Horabagrus; Hyalobagrus; Leiocassis; Mystus; Nanobagrus; Olyra; Pseudomystus; Rama; Rhinobagrus; Rita; Sperata; Sundolyra; Tachysurus: Extinct genera; Eomacrones †; Gobibagrus †; Nkondobagrus †

= Bagridae =

Bagridae Temporal range: 56–0 Ma Eocene to Recent

Family of fishes

The Bagridae are a family of catfish that are native to Africa (Bagrus) and Asia (all other genera) from Japan to Borneo. It includes about 245 species. These fish are commonly known as naked catfishes or bagrid catfishes.

Many large bagrids are important as a source of food. Some species are also kept as aquarium fishes.

== Physical characteristics ==
The dorsal fin is preceded by a spine. The adipose fin is present and can have a relatively long base in some species. The pectoral fin spine can be serrated. The body is completely naked (they have no scales). The maximum length is about 1.5 m (4.9 ft). Fishes of the family Bagridae have four pairs of well-developed barbels covered by a layer of taste bud-enriched epithelium.

== Taxonomy ==
The taxonomy of this family has changed rapidly. Nelson (2006) comments how "the family is very different from that recognized in Nelson (1994)". Claroteidae and Austroglanididae contain species that were previously bagrids. Auchenoglanididae is considered by some sources to be a subfamily of Claroteidae and by others to be its own family, sister to Heptapteridae. In addition some authorities place the genus Horabagrus in the family Horabagridae together with two genera which are currently normally regarded as being in the Schilbeidae.

It is unclear whether or not the family is monophyletic, and what its relationship to other catfishes might be.
