= Visa policy of Thailand =

Policy on permits required to enter Thailand

Visitors to Thailand must obtain an e-Visa unless they are citizens of one of the visa-exempt countries or citizens who may obtain a visa on arrival.

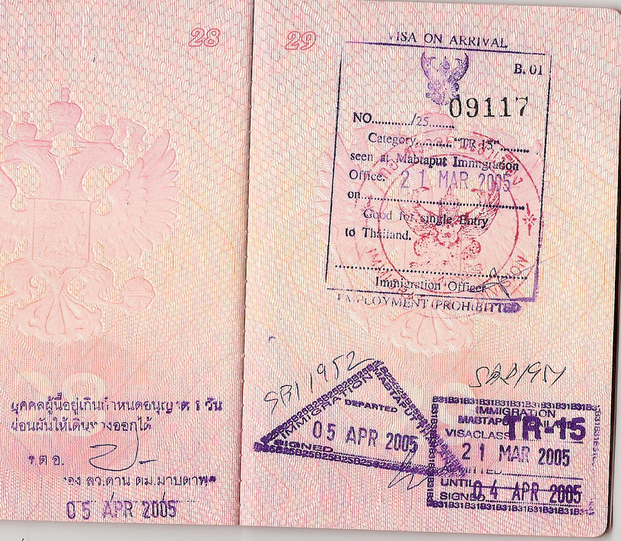
Thai stamps of visa on arrival (up), entry (right), exit (middle) and overstay (left) on a Russian passport

== Visa policy map ==
Visa policy of Thailand Thailand Visa not required (90 days) Visa not required (30 days) Visa not required (15 days) Visa not required (14 days) Visa on arrival (15 days) / eVisa (60 days) eVisa (60 days)

== Visa exemption ==
=== Ordinary passports ===
Citizens of the following countries and territories may enter Thailand without a visa for tourist purposes for stays up to the duration listed below. Citizens entering Thailand under the visa exemption scheme will generally be permitted to cross a land border into the country no more than twice within a calendar year (except for citizens of Brunei, Indonesia, Malaysia and Singapore).

90 days

- Argentina^{B(90)}
- Brazil^{B(90)}
- Chile^{B(90)}
- South Korea^{B(90)}
- Peru^{B(90)}

30 days^{A}

- ASEAN member states (except Cambodia and Myanmar)^{#}
- All European Union member states
- All European Free Trade Association member states
- (Cooperation Council for the Arab States of the Gulf) All Gulf Cooperation Council member states

- Australia
- Bhutan
- Canada
- China^{B(30*) 1}
- Fiji
- Georgia
- Hong Kong^{B(30) 1}
- India
- Israel
- Japan
- Jordan
- Kazakhstan^{B(30*)}
- Kyrgyzstan
- Macau^{B(30) 1}
- Maldives
- Mongolia^{B(30)}
- New Zealand
- Russia^{B(30)}
- South Africa
- Taiwan
- Turkey
- Ukraine
- United Kingdom
- United States

15 days

- Mauritius
- Seychelles

14 days

- Cambodia^{#}
- Myanmar^{# 2}

_{A - May apply to extend their stay for an additional 30 days.}
_{B(xx*) - Thailand has bilateral visa exemption agreements with countries with this mark for stays of xx days. In addition, the stay of countries with * sign are limited to a cumulative maximum stay of 90 days within any 180 days according to bilateral agreements.}
_{# - Thailand has bilateral visa exemption agreements with Cambodia and Myanmar for stays of 14 days and all other ASEAN members for stays of 30 days.}
_{1 - For Chinese citizens with People's Republic of China passports, Hong Kong Special Administrative Region passports or Macao Special Administrative Region passports only.}
_{2 - For air arrivals only.}

==== Electronic Travel Authorization ====
According to government plans as of April 2024, the Electronic Travel Authorization (ETA) system is expected to launch in a pilot phase by December 2024, with full deployment anticipated by June 2025. The ETA will be required for all visa-exempt travelers entering Thailand, regardless of their mode of entry (air, sea, or land). Applications will be submitted through the existing electronic visa portal and each entry into Thailand will require a separate ETA application, which is planned to be free of charge. It will enable holders to use automated gates at immigration checkpoints by scanning a QR code provided with their authorization. The ETA will not required by certain categories of travelers including holders of diplomatic passports, official passports, UN Laissez-Passer, and Border Pass users.

=== APEC Business Travel Card ===
Holders of passports issued by the following countries who possess an APEC Business Travel Card (ABTC) containing "THA" on the back of the card may enter Thailand without a visa for business trips for up to 90 days.

ABTCs are issued to citizens of:

- Australia
- Brunei
- Chile
- China
- Hong Kong
- Indonesia
- Japan
- South Korea
- Malaysia
- Mexico
- New Zealand
- Papua New Guinea
- Peru
- Philippines
- Russia
- Singapore
- Taiwan
- Vietnam

=== Non-ordinary passports ===
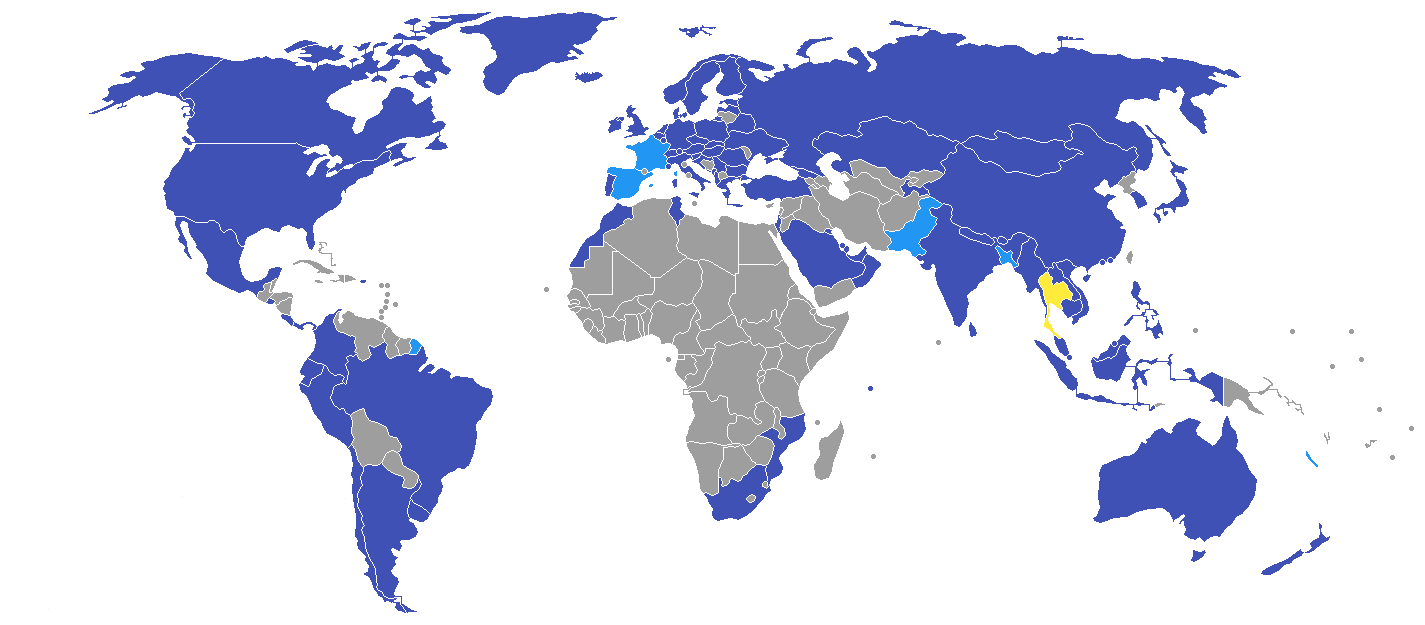
Thailand Diplomatic and service passports Diplomatic passports

Holders of diplomatic, official or service passports issued by the following countries and territories are allowed to visit Thailand without a visa for a maximum period of up to 90 days (unless otherwise noted):

- All ASEAN member states^{1}

- Albania
- Argentina
- Austria
- Bangladesh^{D 1}
- Belarus
- Belgium
- Bhutan
- Brazil
- Bosnia and Herzegovina^{1}
- Bulgaria
- Canada^{1}
- Chile
- China^{1}
- Colombia
- Costa Rica
- Croatia
- Czech Republic
- Ecuador^{1}
- El Salvador
- Estonia
- France
- Georgia
- Germany
- Greece
- Hong Kong^{1}
- Hungary
- India
- Israel
- Italy
- Japan
- Kazakhstan^{1}
- Kosovo
- Kyrgyzstan
- Latvia
- Liechtenstein
- Lithuania
- Luxembourg
- Macau^{1}
- Mexico
- Mongolia^{1}
- Montenegro
- Morocco
- Mozambique^{1}
- Netherlands
- Nepal
- Oman^{1}
- Pakistan^{D 1}
- Panama
- Peru
- Poland
- Romania
- Russia
- Saudi Arabia
- Serbia
- Seychelles
- Slovakia
- South Africa
- South Korea
- Spain^{D}
- Sri Lanka
- Switzerland
- Tajikistan
- Timor-Leste^{1}
- Tunisia
- Turkey
- United Kingdom^{1}
- United States^{1}
- Ukraine
- United Arab Emirates
- Uruguay

_{D - Diplomatic passports only.}
_{1 - 30 days}

=== Visa-free transit ===
Passengers transiting through Suvarnabhumi Airport for less than 12 hours do not require a visa, unless they are travelling on Air Cambodia, Beijing Capital Airlines, Cebu Pacific, Eastar Jet, IndiGo, Jeju Air, Pacific Airlines, Jin Air, Juneyao Air, Scoot, Shandong Airlines, Sichuan Airlines, SpiceJet, Spring Airlines, Trinity Airways or VietJet Air.

Those transiting through Don Mueang International Airport for less than 12 hours do not require a visa only when travelling on Thai AirAsia or Thai AirAsia X.

Citizens of Pakistan are required to obtain a visa when transiting through Thailand at all times.

== Visa on arrival / Electronic visa (e-Visa) ==
Thai eVisa

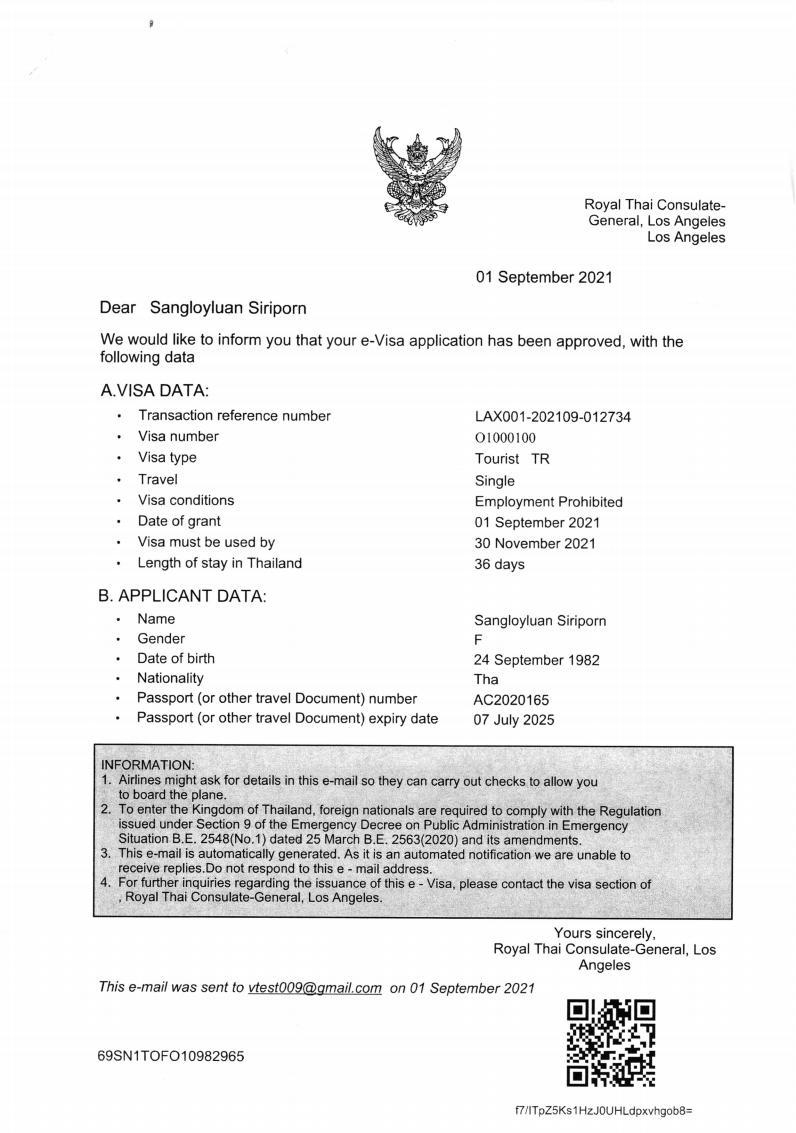
- Sample of Thai e-Visa
- Owner: Ministry of Foreign Affairs
- Website: www.thaievisa.go.th

Besides traditional visa on arrival policy, from 21 November 2018 Thailand started issuing tourist visas valid for 15 days in a simplified procedure to visitors from the countries whose citizens are eligible for visa on arrival. It costs 2,000 THB.

The e-Visa application also became available from February 2019 in some of the consulates of Thailand abroad.

Thailand fully adopts e-Visa from 1 January 2025, making the visa application process simpler, faster and more accessible for foreign travelers.

External image
- Map of entry points with Visa on Arrival facility

Visa type	eVisa		eVOA	VOA
Visa type	Multiple	Single	Single	Single
Duration of stay	60 days		15 days	
Validity	6 Months	3 Months	30 days	N/A
Visa-fee	Depend on applicant's nationality and place of residence (cheaper than VOA)		Standard: 2,560 THB Express: 4,560 THB	Standard: 2,000 THB Express: 2,200 THB
Processing time	3-10 working days		Standard: 24-72 hours Express: less than 24 hours	May take up to several hours (depends on how busy the visa office is at the moment)
Proof of funds	60,000 THB (upload proof online)	20,000 THB (upload proof online)	Following items may be checked at port of entry: 10,000 THB cash per person, or; 20,000 THB cash per family, or; Equivalent foreign currency	
Extendable	Yes		No	
Application submission	thaievisa.go.th		thailandevoa.vfsevisa.com	Visa office at the port of entry

=== Visa on arrival ===
Citizens of the following three countries may apply for a visa on arrival at one of the designated immigration checkpoints in Thailand:

- Azerbaijan
- Belarus
- Serbia

Travellers eligible for a visa on arrival may obtain it at one of the following 48 immigration checkpoints:

International Airport

- Chiang Mai International Airport^{#}
- Chiang Rai International Airport
- Don Mueang International Airport^{#}
- Hat Yai International Airport
- Hua Hin Airport
- Krabi International Airport
- Phuket International Airport^{#}
- Samui Airport
- Sukhothai Airport
- Surat Thani Airport
- Suvarnabhumi Airport^{#}
- Trang Airport
- U-Tapao International Airport

# - Airport which accepts e-visa on arrival

Land and harbor checkpoint

- Aranyaprathet Immigration Checkpoint
- Ban Prakop Immigration Checkpoint
- Bangkok Harbour Immigration Checkpoint
- Betong Immigration Checkpoint
- Bueng Kan Immigration Checkpoint
- Buketa Immigration Checkpoint
- Chiang Khong Immigration Checkpoint
- Chiang Saen Immigration Checkpoint
- Kanchanaburi Land Border Checkpoint
- Khlong Yai Immigration Checkpoint
- Khuan Don Immigration Checkpoint
- Khlong Yai (Hat Lek) Immigration Checkpoint
- Ko Lipe Marine Port Checkpoint
- Krabi Immigration Checkpoint
- Mae Sai Immigration Checkpoint
- Map Ta Phut Immigration Checkpoint
- Mukdahan Immigration Checkpoint
- Nakhon Phanom Immigration Checkpoint
- Nan Immigration Checkpoint
- Nong Khai Immigration Checkpoint
- Nong Khai Harbour Immigration Checkpoint
- Padang Besar Immigration Checkpoint
- Pattaya Immigration Checkpoint
- Phibun Mangsahan Immigration Checkpoint
- Phu Sing Land Border Checkpoint
- Phuket Immigration Checkpoint
- Pong Nam Ron Immigration Checkpoint
- Sadao Immigration Checkpoint
- Samui Immigration Checkpoint
- Samut Prakan Immigration Checkpoint
- Satun Immigration Checkpoint
- Si Racha Immigration Checkpoint
- Songkhla Harbour Immigration Checkpoint
- Su-ngai Kolok Immigration Checkpoint
- Tak Immigration Checkpoint
- Tak Bai Immigration Checkpoint
- Tha Li Immigration Checkpoint

== Mandatory yellow fever vaccination ==
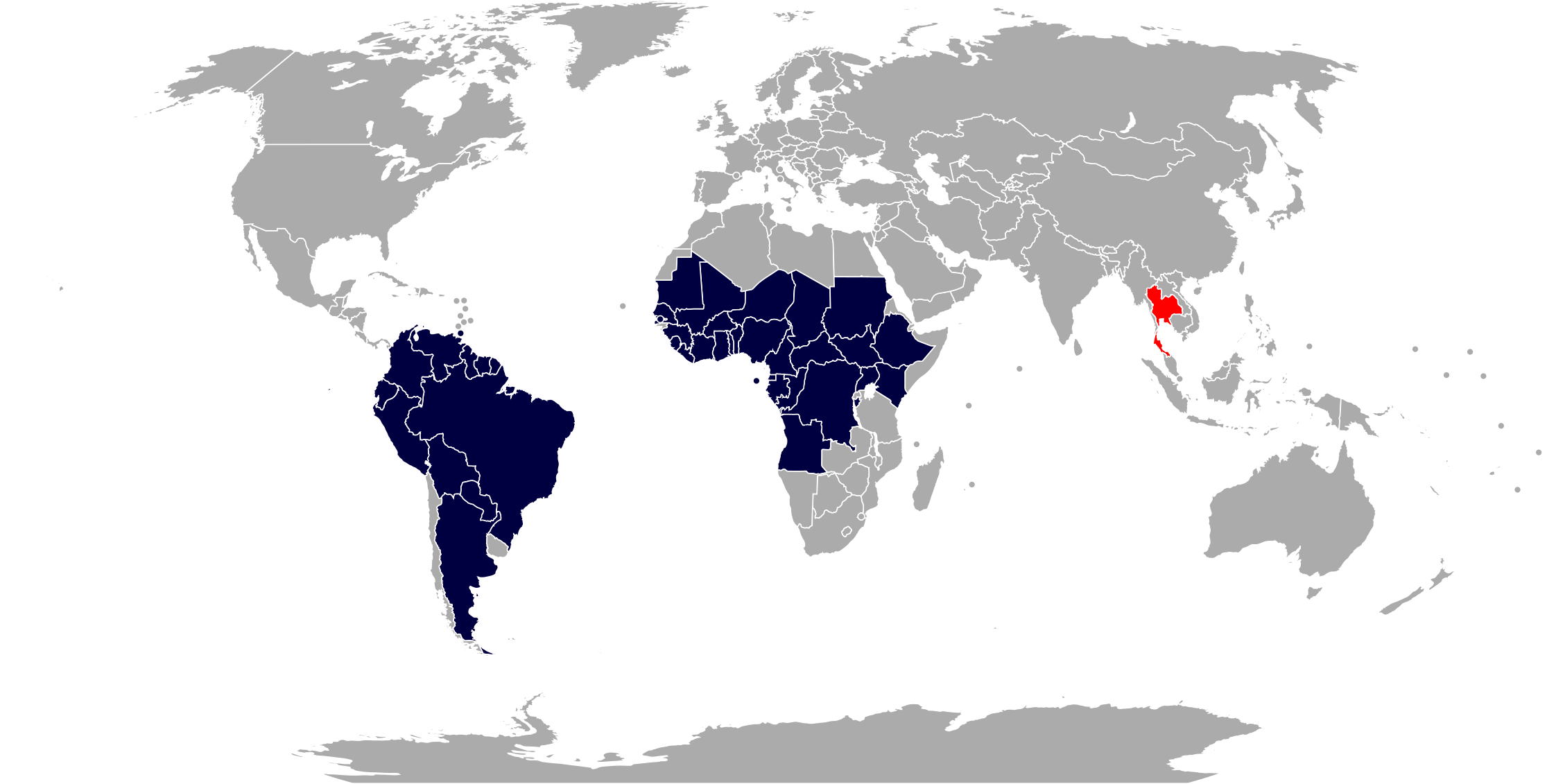
Mandatory yellow fever vaccination for travelers to Thailand (2017), per Ministry of Public Health Announcement B.E. 2560. Navy color shows the required vaccination areas.

Citizens of the following countries or citizens arriving from the following countries require an International Certificate of Vaccination in order to enter Thailand, unless they produce evidence that they do not reside in the following areas.

Failure to fulfill this requirement could result in refusal of entry into Thailand.

- Angola
- Argentina
- Benin
- Bolivia
- Brazil
- Burkina Faso
- Burundi
- Cameroon
- Central African Republic
- Chad
- Colombia
- Congo
- DR Congo
- Ecuador
- Equatorial Guinea
- Ethiopia
- French Guiana
- Gabon
- Gambia
- Ghana
- Guinea
- Guinea-Bissau
- Guyana
- Ivory Coast
- Kenya
- Liberia
- Mali
- Mauritania
- Niger
- Nigeria
- Panama
- Paraguay
- Peru
- Senegal
- Sierra Leone
- South Sudan
- Sudan
- Suriname
- Togo
- Trinidad and Tobago
- Uganda
- Venezuela

== Visa types ==
=== General visa types ===
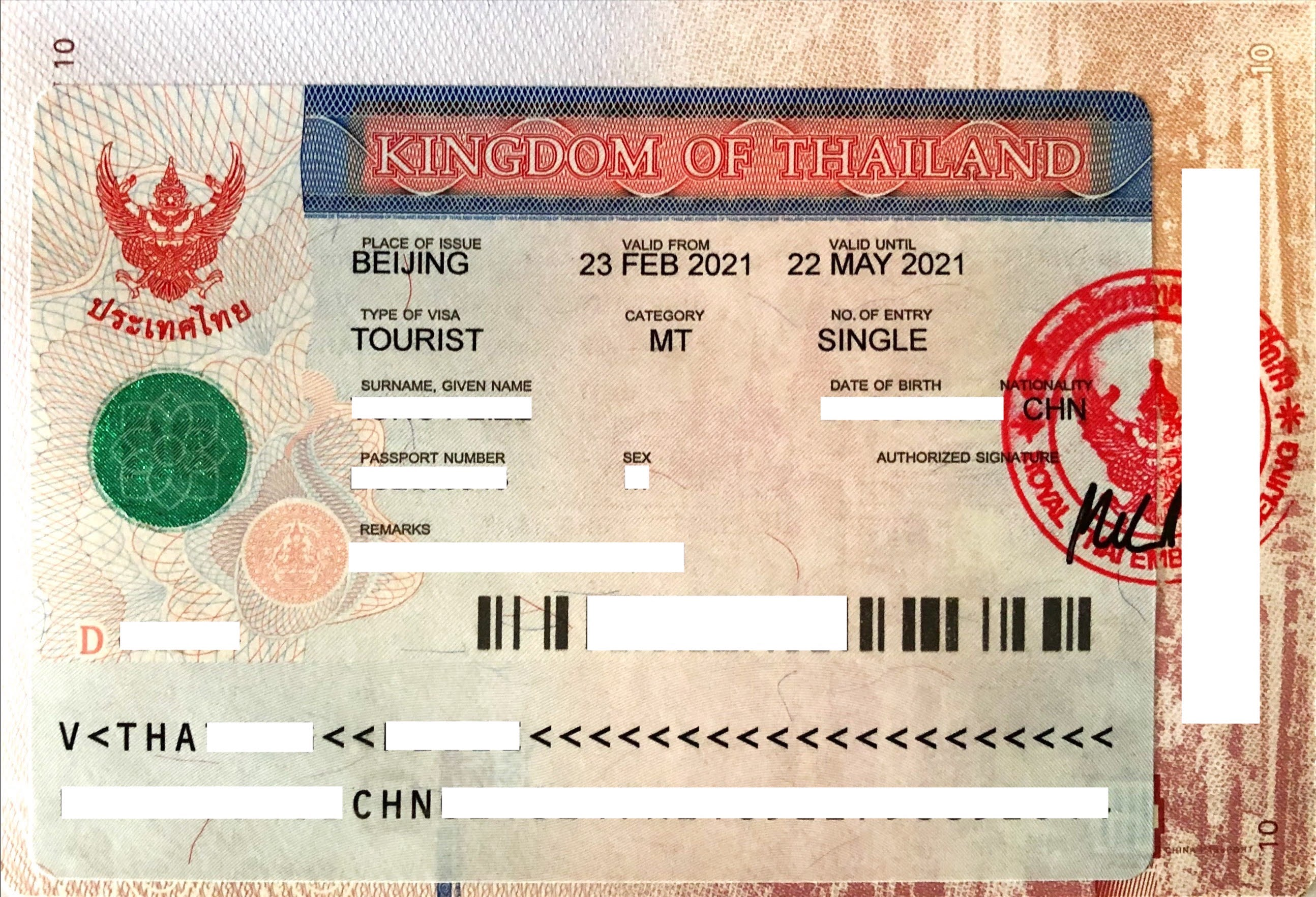
Thai visa on a Chinese passport issued in 2021

- Courte Upon official request, the Royal Thai Embassy may grant courtesy visas/laissez-passer to diplomats/UN officials/others who wish to enter the Kingdom on official duty and/or other purposes
- Permanent resident: To qualify for this visa, you must have stayed in Thailand for 3 consecutive years with the one-year visa extensions. If married to a Thai for 5 years, one must be earning 30,000 baht/month. If single, your monthly income must be 80,000 baht minimum.
- Tourist: If an individual wishes to remain in Thailand for more than 30 days, he/she may wish to obtain a tourist visa at a Royal Thai Embassy or Consulate prior to arriving in Thailand. The tourist visa must be used within validity date, that varies with the number of entries purchased, and allows an initial stay of 60 days. After arrival in Thailand, a tourist visa or a visa exempt entry may be extended once for an additional 30 days according to immigration Bureau order 327/2557. There is a 1,900 baht fee for each extension.
- Transit: This type of visa is issued to applicants who wish to enter the Kingdom for the following purposes: to travel in transit through the Kingdom in order to proceed to the country of destination or to re-enter his/her own country (category "TS"); the person in charge of or crew of a conveyance coming to a port, station, or area in the Kingdom (category "C")

=== Non-Immigrant visa types ===
- Type B: to conduct business; work; attend business conferences; teach school; attend scuba diving, muay Thai, and massage courses
- Type D: diplomatic visa
- Type ED: to study; to come on a work study tour or observation tour; to participate in projects or seminars; to attend a conference or training course; to study as a foreign Buddhist monk
- Type EX: to undertake skilled work or to work as an expert or specialist
- Type F: to perform official duties, e.g., military exercises or governmental assignments
- Type IB: to invest or perform other activities relating to investment, subject to the provision of the established laws on investment promotion
- Type IM: to invest with the concurrence of the Thai ministries and governmental departments concerned
- Type M: to work as a film-producer, journalist, or reporter with permission from the Ministry of Foreign Affairs
- Type O: to visit family; to perform duties for a state enterprise or social welfare organizations (NGOs); to receive medical treatment; to be a sports coach as required by the Thai government; to be a contestant; to be a witness in a judicial process
- Type O-A: retirement visa
- Type R: to perform missionary work or other religious activities with the concurrence of the Thai ministries or government departments concerned
- Type RS: to conduct scientific research or training or teaching in a research institute
- Type S: to participate in an officially recognised sports event.

== History ==
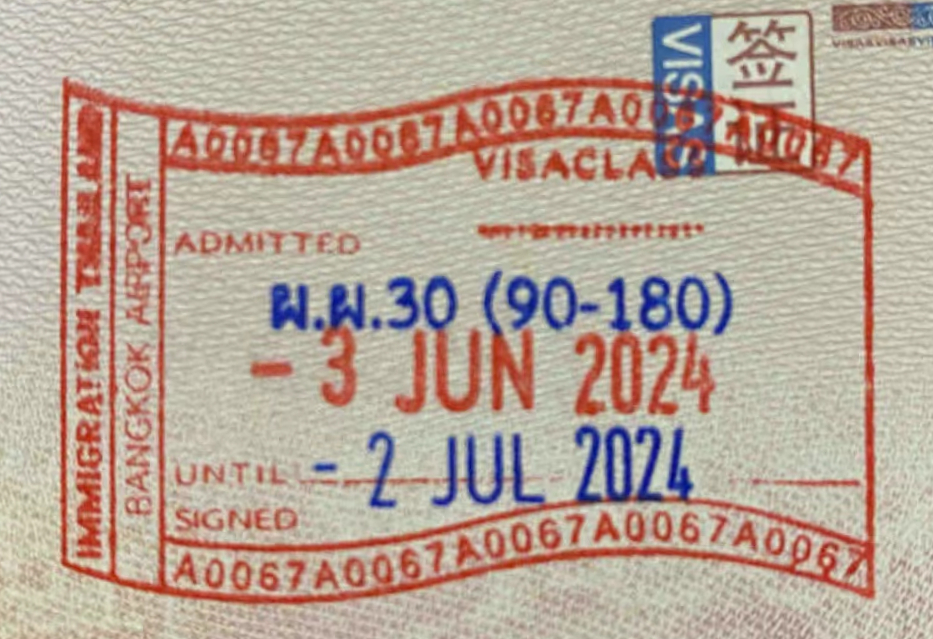
A Thai entry stamp on a Chinese passport, indicates the visitor may stay no more than 30 days in this entry

In May 2014, there was a brief crackdown on visa runs during 2014 Thai coup d'état, meaning that if foreigners wish to re-enter Thailand after their visa-free or visa on arrival period has expired they have to obtain a visa in advance, or remain outside Thailand at least for one night.

In August 2014, Thailand Prime Minister ordered the Immigration Police to be more flexible as the strict application of the law was affecting schools and the tourist industry.

On 31 October 2018 it was announced that within 30 days (by the end of November 2018), overstay visas will no longer be allowed, and there will be no remaining overstayers in the kingdom by that date.

Beginning 1 May 2025, all foreigners entering Thailand will be required to apply for the Thailand Digital Arrival Card (TDAC), a replacement of TM6 Form. It is neither a visa nor an ETA because it is required for all foreigners, regardless the visa status.

As of June 2025, Thailand has reduced permitted stays of Cambodian nationals from 60 days to 7 days, as a reciprocity measure of 2025 Cambodian–Thai border crisis.

In November 2025, Thailand again imposed stricter immigration rules in a bid to crack down on foreign criminals engaged in cybercrime. Foreign nationals exceeding the maximum limit of two visa-free entries per year without a valid reason will be denied entry into Thailand. However, the new rules were poorly publicised according to the Thai tourism industry, which called on the Thai authorities to clarify the updated rules and ensure that the information reaches tourists planning to enter Thailand without a visa. In January 2026, it was clarified that there is no such rule that restricts foreign nationals to enter Thailand visa-free only twice per year.

On 15 December 2025, Thailand implemented enhanced security measures at major Thai airports targeting two "high-risk groups", namely Cambodian nationals and suspected "mercenaries from Eastern Europe and Northern Asia" entering Thailand without a visa.

On 19 May 2026, the Thai cabinet meeting resolved to cancel the 60-day visa-free scheme for more than 90 countries. All countries affected by the cancellation of the 60-day visa-free scheme will return to their previous visa categories.

== Visitor statistics ==
Most visitors arriving in Thailand on short term basis were from the following countries of nationality:

Country	2025	2024	2023	2022	2021	2020	2019	2018	2017	2016	2015	2014	2013	2012
Malaysia	4,520,856	4,952,078	4,626,422	1,948,549	5,511	619,623	4,265,574	4,020,526	3,494,488	3,494,890	3,418,855	2,613,418	3,041,097	2,554,397
China	4,473,992	6,733,162	3,521,095	273,567	13,043	1,251,498	10,997,338	10,535,241	9,806,260	8,757,646	7,936,795	4,636,298	4,637,335	2,786,860
India	2,487,319	2,129,149	1,628,542	997,913	6,544	263,659	1,996,842	1,598,346	1,415,197	1,194,508	1,069,422	932,603	1,050,889	1,013,308
Russia	1,898,837	1,745,327	1,482,611	435,008	30,759	590,151	1,483,337	1,472,789	1,346,338	1,090,083	884,136	1,606,430	1,746,565	1,316,564
South Korea	1,555,227	1,868,945	1,660,042	538,766	12,077	262,017	1,890,973	1,796,426	1,709,265	1,464,200	1,373,045	1,122,566	1,295,342	1,163,619
Japan	1,091,227	1,050,904	805,768	290,146	9,461	322,677	1,806,438	1,656,101	1,544,442	1,439,510	1,381,702	1,267,886	1,536,425	1,373,716
United Kingdom	1,083,162	965,862	817,220	444,432	38,663	223,087	992,574	986,854	994,755	1,004,345	947,568	907,877	905,024	873,053
United States	1,081,929	1,030,733	930,206	453,678	37,880	212,669	1,165,950	1,122,270	1,056,423	975,643	867,505	763,520	823,486	768,638
Taiwan	987,633	1,089,910	724,594	94,834	1,675	117,511	790,039	687,748	573,077	522,273	552,699	394,149	502,176	394,225
Singapore	967,341	1,009,640	1,027,424	614,627	5,931	126,771	1,059,484	1,069,867	1,032,647	967,550	938,385	844,133	955,468	831,215
Germany	965,898	873,364	729,163	365,030	45,874	231,782	852,481	886,523	850,139	837,885	761,819	715,240	73 7,658	682,419
Laos	868,368	1,124,202	919,401	502,124	733	380,207	1,854,792	1,664,630	1,682,087	1,388,020	1,220,522	1,053,983	976,639	975,999
France	816,935	720,806	545,003	268,587	23,461	237,317	745,346	749,556	740,190	738,878	681,114	635,073	611,582	576,106
Australia	808,682	775,010	687,745	336,688	9,577	123,827	767,291	801,203	817,218	796,370	807,450	831,854	900,460	930,241
Indonesia	787,524	876,610	762,118	235,632	2,577	99,530	710,494	644,709	576,110	534,797	469,125	497,592	594,251	447,820
Philippines	704,575	598,124	461,251	178,021	4,078	72,762	506,430	432,237	381,252	339,150	310,968	304,813	321,571	289,566
Myanmar	688,678	546,629	394,134	193,778	7,256	55,279	378,232	368,188	365,606	341,626	259,678	206,794	172,383	129,385
Vietnam	660,386	984,248	1,033,688	468,393	1,794	132,127	1,048,181	1,028,150	935,179	830,220	751,162	559,415	725,057	618,670
Hong Kong	643,158	876,076	802,368	162,240	1,657	124,518	1,045,361	1,015,749	821,064	751,264	669,617	483,131	588,335	473,666
Israel	410,125	281,803	217,084	146,293	14,038	29,444	195,856	188,788	173,673	161,579	141,031	138,778	134,874	129,551
Italy	311,852	267,474	191,983	85,254	5,322	60,602	272,374	279,905	264,524	265,597	246,094	219,875	207,192	200,703
Netherlands	284,343	261,467	229,539	116,354	8,539	52,402	241,608	236,265	222,409	235,762	221,619	211,524	218,765	208,122
Canada	263,954	251,336	214,264	90,608	6,440	58,499	273,214	276,094	258,494	244,869	227,601	211,059	229,897	219,354
Cambodia	253,557	553,060	583,708	379,665	4,914	165,027	910,696	948,824	840,871	674,975	537,950	550,339	481,595	423,642
Poland	237,570	180,722	121,700	49,469										
Sweden	236,833	212,523	178,259	97,378	17,094	111,994	287,341	311,949	323,736	332,895	321,690	324,865	341,398	364,681
Spain	216,249	207,710	153,458	87,400	3,514	25,904	188,997	181,880	179,584	168,900	150,995	116,983	123,084	113,141
Saudi Arabia	213,055	228,032	178,113	96,389	467	4,227	30,006	28,337	33,531	24,834	19,168	12,860	21,452	17,084
Switzerland	194,911	184,046	156,337	81,180	11,429	52,361	192,130	207,471	209,528	209,057	206,480	201,271	199,923	191,147
United Arab Emirates	172,979	169,927	138,934	65,857	4,061	7,492	130,158	128,270	137,218	130,941	124,719	117,907	123,926	113,547
Kazakhstan	166,620	195,089	172,489	59,468										
Denmark	148,337	138,278	115,224	64,249	8,480	66,848	162,456	169,373	161,920	165,581	159,435	160,977	163,186	167,499
Bangladesh	144,333	142,268	140,657	81,106	1,955	21,838	136,677	129,574	121,765	100,263	107,394	88,134	82,418	72,657
Turkey	127,525	92,116	69,108	27,128										
Norway	122,734	109,731	83,952	46,521	5,763	39,778	127,992	128,841	127,850	131,039	135,382	145,207	154,049	148,796
Belgium	122,347	108,046	85,512	48,684	5,386	26,394	114,669	114,270	112,266	111,013	106,090	99,729	101,109	94,896
Oman	119,577	103,317	86,488	35,204										
Austria	114,715	107,074	88,706	42,683	5,486	36,381	111,428	116,656	104,784	100,373	97,869	100,968	106,278	94,667
New Zealand	101,137	96,733	85,897	35,900	1,151	15,709	112,680	116,726	117,962	111,595	112,411	108,081	118,395	113,871
Sri Lanka	98,826	60,372	33,893	12,734	576	8,155								
Total	32,974,321	35,545,714	28,150,016	11,153,026	427,869	6,725,193	39,916,251	38,178,194	35,591,978	32,529,588	29,923,185	24,809,683	26,546,725	22,353,903

== Work permit ==
To legally work in Thailand, a foreigner must apply for a work permit. Work permit is a legal document that states a foreigner's position, current occupation, or job description and the Thai company he is working with. It also serves as a license to perform a job or an occupation allowed for foreigners inside Thailand.

A foreigner is eligible to apply for a work permit as long as he has a non-immigrant visa or a resident visa, has an available employer who will provide documents for work permit, and the occupation he will perform is not prohibited to foreigners.

== One Stop Service Centre for Visas and Work Permits ==
The One Stop Service Centre for Visas and Work Permits was established on 1 July 1997 by authority of the Regulations of the Office of Prime Minister promulgated on 30 June 1997.

The objective of this centre is to simplify visa extension and permit issuance procedures to create a good investment environment. It aims to facilitate applications of visa extension and work permits (e.g., stay permission, re-entry permit, work permit).

The Center is located on Chamchuree Square Building, Floor 18, Phatumwan, Bangkok.

=== Foreigners who are eligible to apply for visa extension and work permits ===
- Foreigner who is an executive or expert with privileges accorded to them by the following laws:
  1. Investment Promotion Act B.E. 2520 (1977);
  2. Petroleum Act B.E. 2514 (1971);
  3. Industrial Estate Authority of Thailand Act B.E. 2522 (1979);
- Foreigner who is an investor.
  1. If investing not less than 2 million Baht, he or she will be granted a 1-year permit.
  2. If investing not less than 10 million Baht, he or she will be granted a 2-year permit.
- Foreigner who is an executive or expert.
- Foreigner's associated company should be registered with capital or possess asset of not less than 30 million Baht.
- Foreigner who is a member of the foreign press must present a letter from the Ministry of Foreign Affairs and a copy of an ID Press Card issued by the Department of Public Relations.
- Foreigner who is a researcher or developer on science and technology.
- Foreigner who is employed in a branch office of an overseas bank, foreign banking office of an overseas bank, provincial foreign banking office of an overseas bank or a representative office of the foreign bank in which all offices are certified by the Bank of Thailand.
- Foreigner who works on the necessary and urgent basis for a period of no longer than 15 days.
- Foreigner who is an official of the representative office for foreign juristic persons concerning the International Trading Business and Regional Office of Transnational Corporation in accordance to the Foreign Business Act B.E. 2542 (1999).
- Foreigner who is an expert on information technology.
- Foreigner who works at regional operating headquarters.

== See also ==
- Visa requirements for Thai citizens
- Thai passport
- Thai national ID card
- Tourism in Thailand
- Thailand Digital Arrival Card
