= TDAC =

TDAC may refer to:

- Time-domain aliasing cancellation, the underlying principle of the modified discrete cosine transform (MDCT)
- Tycho Data Analysis Consortium, that worked on the Hipparcos spacecraft astrometry data
- Thailand Digital Arrival Card
