= Thai passport =

Passport issued to Thai nationals

Thai passport; หนังสือเดินทางไทย
- The front cover of a contemporary Thai biometric passport, 3rd version released 2020 (latest version)
- Type: Passport
- Issued by: (Thailand) Ministry of Foreign Affairs
- First issued: 1939 (booklet); 1993 (machine-readable passport); 1 August 2005 (1st Generation ePassport); February 2013 (2nd Generation ePassport); July 2020 (3rd Generation ePassport)
- Purpose: Identity document
- Eligibility: Thai citizenship
- Expiration: 5 or 10 years
- Cost: ฿1,000 for 5 years, ฿1,500 for 10 years validity

The Thai passport (Thai: หนังสือเดินทางไทย) is the passport issued to citizens and nationals of Thailand by the Passport Division of the Department of Consular Affairs within the Ministry of Foreign Affairs. Thai biometric passports have been issued since August 2005.

== History ==
The history of Thai passports can be traced back to travel documents first issued during the reign of King Chulalongkorn in the late-19th century. The first passport regulations in Thailand were enacted on 10 September 1917, in order to ensure the country's security during World War I. A Thai passport booklet was first introduced in 1939 in Thai and French language which was changed to Thai and English in 1977. The first machine-readable Thai passports were introduced in 1993, and in August 2005 Thailand became only the second country in the world and in Asia (after Malaysia) to introduce biometric passports. In 2019, the validity of Thai passports was increased from 5 years to 10 years.

A 3rd generation passport planned for release in mid 2020 will feature iris scan identification and be valid for 10 years. The number of offices available to apply for a passport will increase from 319 to 500.

In 2024, Prime Minister Srettha Thavisin discussed with the Belgian and German government in a push to get visa exemptions from member states of the Schengen area.

== Physical appearance ==
The ordinary Thai passport cover is medium brown with the Emblem of Thailand emblazoned in the centre. The official passport has a blue cover, the diplomatic passport a red cover and the temporary passport a green cover. All types have the word "หนังสือเดินทาง ประเทศไทย" (English translation: หนังสือเดินทาง nangsue doen thang- Passport; ประเทศไทย prathet thai - Thailand) above the national emblem and the words THAILAND - PASSPORT below it. The biometric symbol is at the bottom of e-passports. The passport contains 66 pages.

== Types of Thai passport ==
- Certificate of Identity (C.I.) - Issued to a Thai citizen who has had a passport stolen, lost, or damaged for emergency return to Thailand. (C.I. valid for 10 days and expires when the holder reenters Thailand.)
- Travel Document for Alien (yellow cover) - Issued to non-Thai citizens who hold a certificate of Permanent Residence in Thailand for traveling abroad. The holder of this travel document must apply for a re-entry permit before leaving Thailand. A Travel Document for Alien will not be issued to a person who holds a valid passport from their country.
- Temporary passport (dark green cover) - Issued while waiting to get a new passport while abroad and when needed to travel to other countries. (Valid for one year and must be returned when the new passport is received.)
- Hajj passport - Issued to Thai Muslims for a pilgrimage to Mecca. (Valid for two years.)
- Ordinary passport (maroon cover) - Issued for ordinary travel, such as vacations and business trips. (Valid five or ten years)
- Official passport (dark blue cover) - Issued to individuals representing the Thai government or a government officer on official business.
- Diplomatic passport (red cover) - Issued to members of the Thai royal family, top ranking government officials, and government officials in the field of diplomatic service.

== Cost of Thai passport ==
- Ordinary passport is 1,000 or 1,500 Thai baht.
- Official passport is 1,000 baht.
- Diplomatic passport is free of charge.
- Hajj passport is 400 baht.
- Travel Document for Alien is 500 baht.
- Temporary passport is 296 baht.

== Identity information page ==
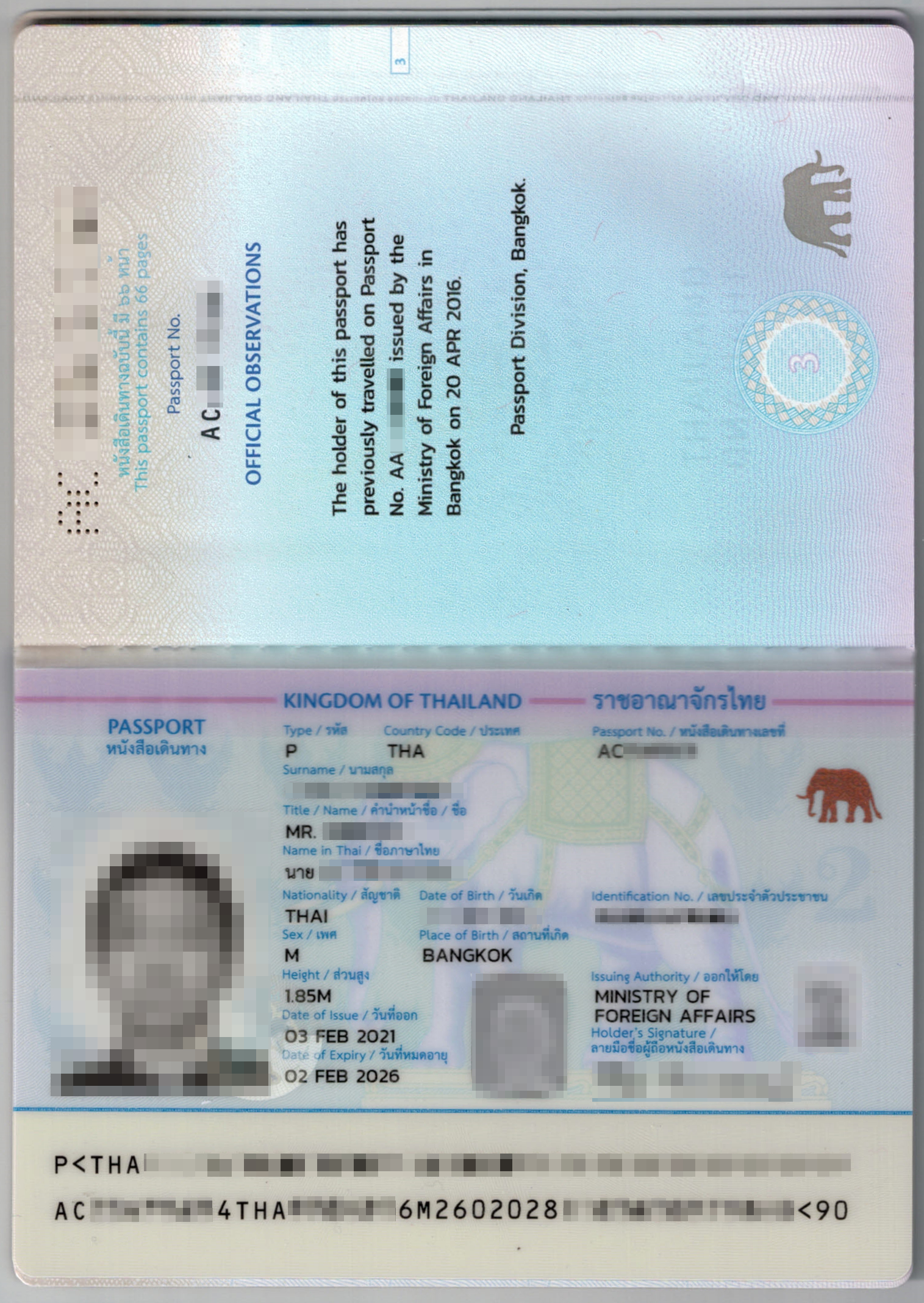
Thai Biometric Passport (3rd Generation)

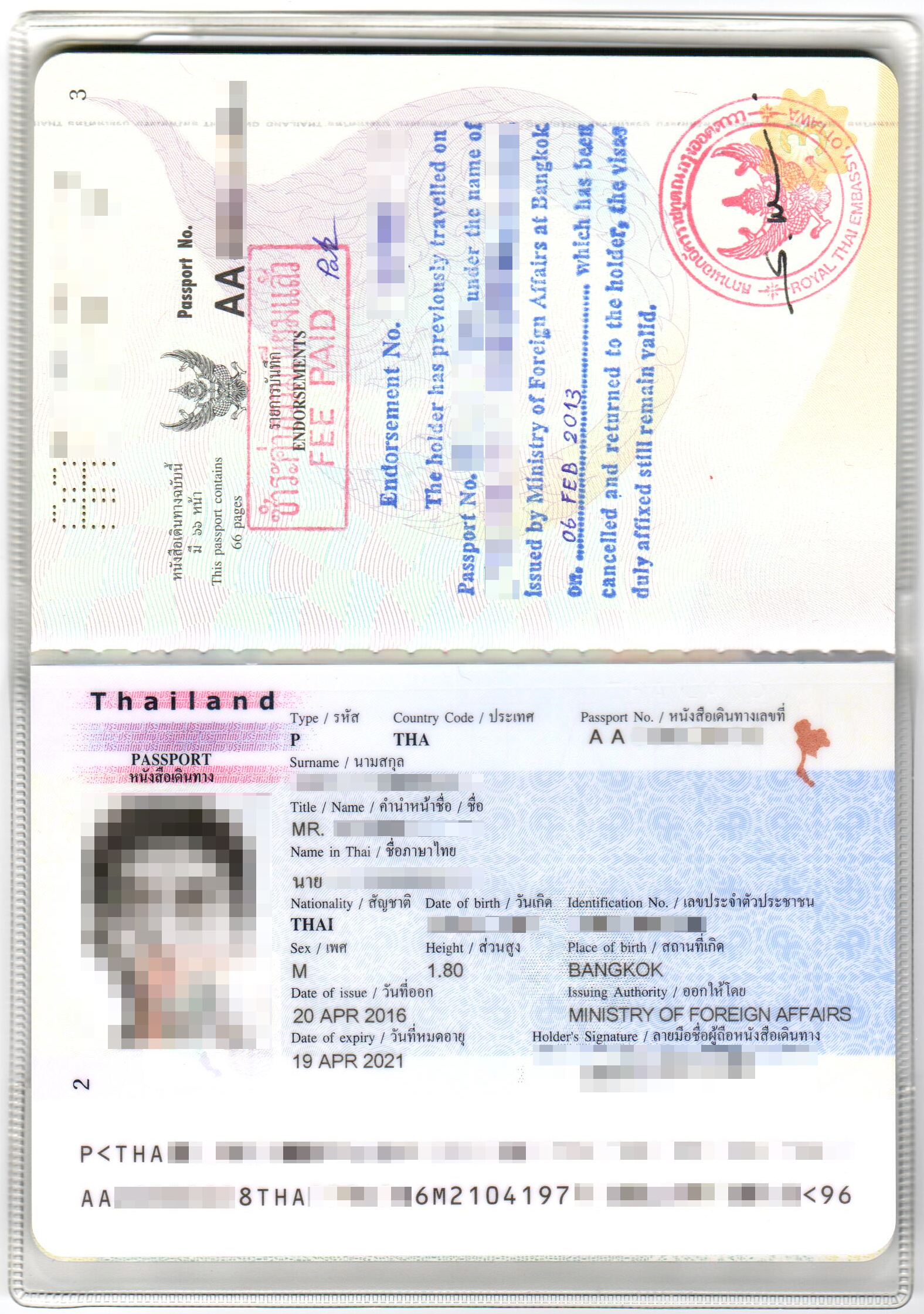
Thai Biometric Passport (2nd Generation)

Thai passport includes the following data:

- Photograph of the holder (digital image printed on page)
- Type/รหัส ('P' for Passport)
- Country code/ประเทศ ('THA' for Thailand)
- Passport number/หนังสือเดินทางเลขที่
- Surname/นามสกุล
- Title Name/คำนำหน้าชื่อ ชื่อ (MR./MS./MRS./Master holder's name)
- Name in Thai/ชื่อภาษาไทย (name in ethnic script - title, name and Surname in Thai)
- Nationality/สัญชาติ ('THAI')
- Personal No./เลขประจำตัวประชาชน (same as Thai National Identification Card)
- Place of birth/สถานที่เกิด (Provinces, Bangkok or other province)
- Date of birth/วันเกิด (in DD-MMM-YYYY format, such as 14-DEC-1989)
- Sex/เพศ ('M' or 'F')
- Date of issue/วันที่ออก (in DD-MMM-YYYY)
- Date of expiry/วันที่หมดอายุ (in DD-MMM-YYYY, five or ten years from date of issue)
- Authority/ออกให้โดย (MINISTRY OF FOREIGN AFFAIRS)
- Height/ส่วนสูง (in metres)
- Signature of bearer/ลายมือชื่อผู้ถือหนังสือเดินทาง (hand-written signature or finger print)
- Machine Readable Zone starting with P<THA

== Note ==
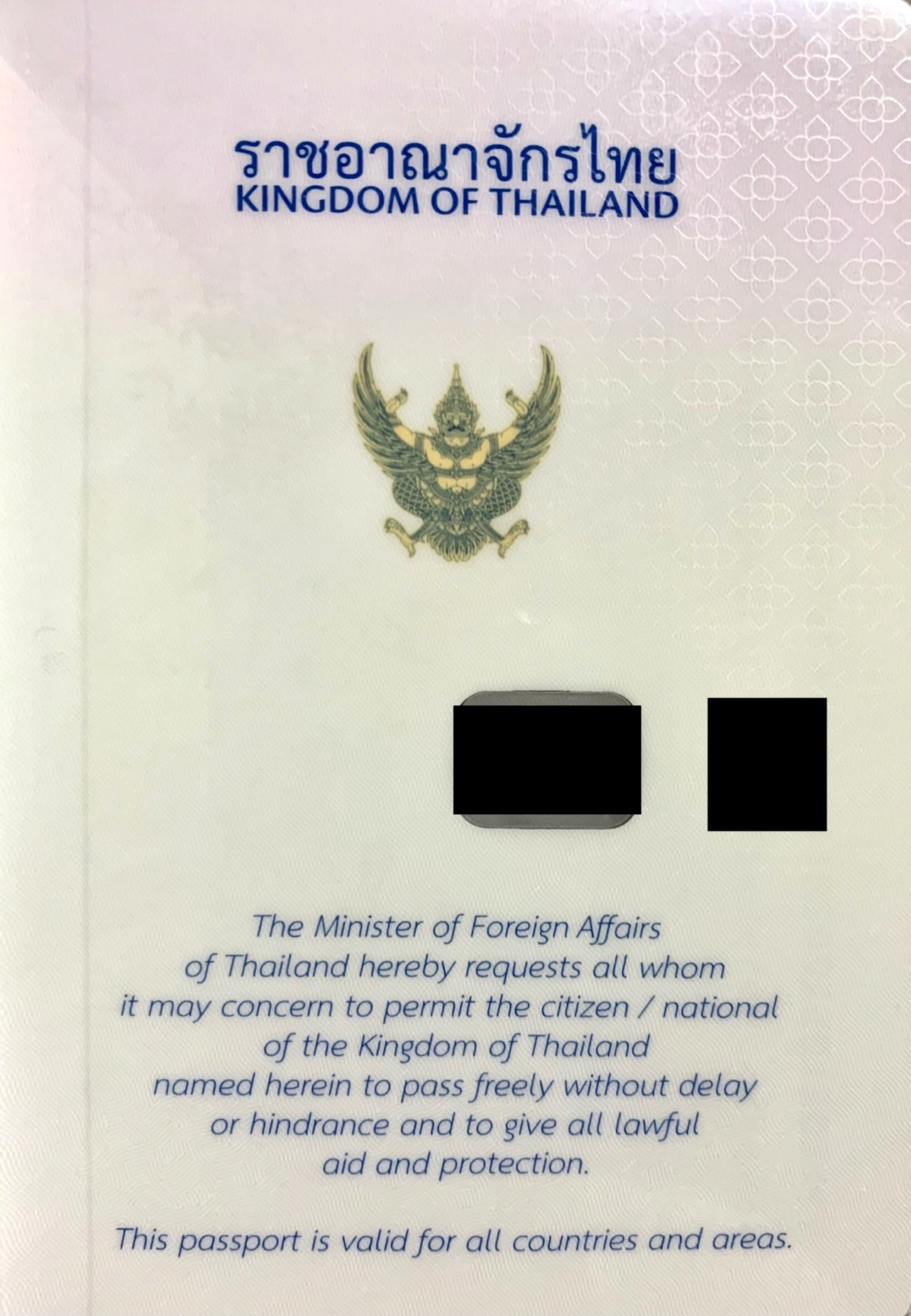
The note inside the Thai Passport

The request note inside a Thai passport states:

The Minister of Foreign Affairs of Thailand hereby requests all whom it may concern to permit the citizen/national of the Kingdom of Thailand named herein to pass freely without delay or hindrance and to give all lawful aid and protection. This passport is valid for all countries and areas.

Translation in Thai:

กระทรวงการต่างประเทศแห่งประเทศไทยจักร้องขอ ณ โอกาสนี้ยังผู้เกี่ยวข้อง ได้ยินยอมให้ประชาชน/ราษฎรแห่งราชอาณาจักรไทย ผู้ปรากฏนาม ณ ที่นี้ ได้ผ่านไปโดยเสรี มิให้ล่าช้าฤๅกีดกั้น ทั้งโปรดอนุเคราะห์และปกป้องโดยนิติธรรม หนังสือเดินทางนี้มีผลแก่ทุกประเทศแลดินแดน

This is stated in English only. All other information is printed in Thai and in English.

== Visa requirements ==
Countries and territories with visa-free entries or visas on arrival for holders of regular Thai passports Thailand Visa-free Visa on arrival or eVisa Visa on arrival eVisa Visa required

Visa requirements for Thai citizens are administrative entry restrictions by the authorities of other states placed on citizens of Thailand.

As of April 2025, Thai citizens had visa-free or visa on arrival access to 82 countries and territories, ranking the Thai passport 59th in the world according to the Henley Passport Index.

== Thai Passport Holders Living as Permanent Residents Abroad ==
For some countries, Thai nationals may enter as tourists without an advance visa provided they can produce official documentation of lawful permanent residence abroad. In particular, Thai permanent residents of the United States or Canada can show their US Green Card or Canadian Permanent Resident Card together with their Thai passport in order to gain entry to many countries in Central America and the Caribbean. Notable example is Jamaica. (Note that in many cases US or Canadian permanent residence will allow a traveler to gain entry as a tourist regardless of their nationality).

== See also ==
- Thai national ID card
- Visa policy of Thailand
- Visa requirements for Thai citizens

== Sources ==
- Thailand Ministry of Foreign Affairs - Visa Exemption
- Thailand's Department of Consular Affairs's website
