= Visa requirements for Thai citizens =

Administrative entry restrictions

A Thai passport

Visa requirements for Thai citizens are administrative entry restrictions imposed on citizens of Thailand by the authorities of other states.

As of 2026, Thai citizens had visa-free or visa on arrival access to 76 countries and territories, ranking the Thai passport 59th in the world according to the Henley Passport Index.

Thailand is also a part of ASEAN and has visa-free access to these countries and vice versa.

== Visa requirements map ==
Visa requirements for Thai citizens holding ordinary passports Thailand Visa not required Visa on arrival eVisa Visa available both on arrival or online Visa required

== Visa requirements ==
Country	Visa requirement	Allowed stay	Notes (excluding departure fees)
Afghanistan	eVisa	30 days	e-Visa : Visitors must arrive at Kabul International (KBL).
Albania	eVisa	90 days	
Algeria	Visa required		Persons may be denied entry if entering with a passport containing visas or stamps issued by Israel.; Visitors on tours organized to some southern regions by an approved travel agency may obtain a visa on arrival for up to 30 days.
Andorra	Visa required		A Schengen visa is required as entry is only possible via France or Spain.
Angola	eVisa	30 days	
Antigua and Barbuda	eVisa		
Argentina	Visa not required	90 days	
Armenia	eVisa / Visa on arrival	120 days	
Australia	Visa required		May apply online (Online Visitor e600 visa).
Austria	Visa required		
Azerbaijan	eVisa	30 days	
Bahamas	eVisa	3 months	
Bahrain	eVisa / Visa on arrival	14 days	
Bangladesh	Visa required		
Barbados	Visa not required	90 days	
Belarus	Visa required		Visas are issued on arrival at the Minsk International Airport if the support documents were submitted not later than 3 business days before expected date of arrival.
Belgium	Visa required		
Belize	Visa required		Free Visitor's Permit on arrival with valid U.S. visa.
Benin	eVisa	30 days	Must have an international vaccination certificate.; Three types of electronic visa are offered: the e-Visa valid for 30 days for a single entry (50 EUR), the e-Visa valid for 30 days for several (multiple) entries (75 EUR), and the e-Visa valid for 90 days to make several (multiple) entries (100 EUR).
Bhutan	eVisa	90 days	The Sustainable Development Fee (SDF) of 200 USD per person, per night for almost all visitors to Bhutan. Additionally, if payment is made in US dollars from September 1, 2023 to August 31, 2027, the SDF is 100 USD.
Bolivia	Online Visa		
Bosnia and Herzegovina	Visa required		
Botswana	eVisa	3 months	
Brazil	Visa not required	90 days	
Brunei	Visa not required	14 days	
Bulgaria	Visa required		
Burkina Faso	eVisa		
Burundi	Online Visa / Visa on arrival	1 month	
Cambodia	Visa not required	14 days	
Cameroon	eVisa		
Canada	Visa required		Visitors who have either held a Canadian visa in the last 10 years or who "currently hold a valid United States non-immigrant visa" can now apply for an eTA for up to 6 months instead of a visa when travelling to Canada by air.
Cape Verde	Visa on arrival (EASE)	30 days	Visa on arrival may applied for via the online platform (EASE) and issued at international airports in Sal, Boa Vista, São Vicente or Santiago. Visa fee is approximately 25–30 EUR.; Visitors must pay the Airport Security Fee (TSA) before visiting. The cost is 3,400 CVE (approx. 31 EUR) and can be paid via the online platform (EASE).
Central African Republic	Visa required		
Chad	eVisa		
Chile	Visa not required	90 days	
China	Visa not required	30 days	The duration of stay is 30 days at a time, no more than 90 days within any 180-day period.
Colombia	Online Visa		Visa-free for holders of valid visa for Schengen area or the US.
Comoros	Visa on arrival	45 days	
Republic of the Congo	Visa required		
Democratic Republic of the Congo	eVisa	7 days	
Costa Rica	Visa required		Visa-free for holders of valid U.S. visa or Canada visa.
Côte d'Ivoire	eVisa	3 months	e-Visa holders must arrive via Port Bouet Airport.
Croatia	Visa required		
Cuba	eVisa	90 days	Can be extended up to 90 days with a fee.
Cyprus	Visa required		
Czech Republic	Visa required		
Denmark	Visa required		
Djibouti	eVisa	90 days	
Dominica	Visa not required	21 days	
Dominican Republic	Visa not required	30 days	
Ecuador	Visa not required	90 days	
Egypt	Visa required		Transit Without Visa if Holders of onward tickets for a max transit time of 48 hours (up to 2 days), Leaving the airport is permitted for passengers with transit time longer than 6 hours. Passengers with transit time of less than 6 hours may leave the transit area but not the airport.
El Salvador	Visa required		
Equatorial Guinea	eVisa		
Eritrea	Visa required		
Estonia	Visa required		
Eswatini	Visa required		
Ethiopia	eVisa / Visa on arrival	90 days	Visa on arrival is obtainable only at Addis Ababa Bole International Airport.; e-Visa holders must arrive via Addis Ababa Bole International Airport.; e-Visa is available for 30 or 90 days.
Fiji	Visa not required	120 days	
Finland	Visa required		
France	Visa required		
Gabon	eVisa	90 days	e-Visa holders must arrive via Libreville International Airport.
Gambia	Visa required		An entry clearance must be obtained from the Gambian Immigration prior to travel.
Georgia	Visa not required	1 year	
Germany	Visa required		
Ghana	Visa required		
Greece	Visa required		
Grenada	Visa required		
Guatemala	Visa required		No visa required with a valid visa issued by Canada, Mexico, USA or a Schengen Member State for a maximum stay of 90 days.
Guinea	eVisa	90 days	
Guinea-Bissau	Visa on arrival	90 days	
Guyana	eVisa		
Haiti	Visa not required	90 days	
Honduras	Visa required		No visa required with a valid visa issued by Canada, Mexico, USA or a Schengen Member State for a maximum stay of 90 days.
Hungary	Visa required		
Iceland	Visa required		
India	eVisa	30 days	Thai tourists can visit India for up to 30 days with double entry under this scheme without paying any visa fees. However, e-Tourist visas still need to be applied for in advance via the website: https://indianvisaonline.gov.in/evisa/tvoa.html.
Indonesia	Visa not required	30 days	
Iran	eVisa	30 days	
Iraq	Visa required		
Ireland	Visa required		Visa waiver for UK 'C' visa holders until October 2016. Entry permitted only if first point of entry to the Common Travel Area is in the UK.
Israel	Visa required		Holders of a confirmation issued by the Israeli Ministry of Interior, traveling in a group of 10 or more can obtain a visa on arrival.
Italy	Visa required		
Jamaica	Visa required		
Japan	Visa not required	15 days	Visa not required for visits up to 15 days using Thai biometric passports.
Jordan	eVisa / Visa on arrival		
Kazakhstan	Visa not required	30 days	
Kenya	Electronic Travel Authorisation	90 days	Applications can be submitted up to 90 days prior to travel and must be submitted at least 3 days in advance.; eTA fee is 32.50 USD.; Proof of reservation at the hotel where visitors plan to stay is required (if staying with friends, an invitation letter is also acceptable).; Yellow fever vaccination certificate is required if coming from endemic countries.
Kiribati	Visa not required	90 days	
North Korea	Visa required		
South Korea	Electronical Travel Authorization	90 days	The validity period of a K-ETA is 3 years from the date of approval.; K-ETA often denies entry to Thai citizens.
Kuwait	Visa required		
Kyrgyzstan	Visa not required	30 days	30 days within any 60-day period.
Laos	Visa not required	30 days	
Latvia	Visa required		
Lebanon	Visa required		
Lesotho	Visa required		
Liberia	e-VOA	3 months	
Libya	eVisa		
Liechtenstein	Visa required		
Lithuania	Visa required		
Luxembourg	Visa required		
Madagascar	eVisa / Visa on arrival	90 days	For stays of 61 to 90 days, the visa fee is 59 USD.
Malawi	eVisa / Visa on arrival	90 days	
Malaysia	Visa not required	30 days	
Maldives	Free visa on arrival	30 days	
Mali	Visa required		
Malta	Visa required		
Marshall Islands	Visa on arrival	90 days	
Mauritania	eVisa	30 days	Available at Nouakchott–Oumtounsy International Airport.
Mauritius	Visa on arrival	60 days	
Mexico	Visa required		No visa required for holders of a valid visa issued by Canada, Japan, USA, United Kingdom or a Schengen Member State and holders of an APEC Business Travel Card if traveling on business. Residence permit from EU not recognized.
Micronesia	Visa not required	30 days	
Moldova	eVisa		Need invitation letter to apply for e-Visa, except for holders of a residence permit or a valid visa (except Transit Visa) issued by an EU Member State or a state party to the Schengen Agreement.
Monaco	Visa required		
Mongolia	Visa not required	30 days	
Montenegro	Visa required		
Morocco	eVisa	30 days	
Mozambique	eVisa / Visa on arrival	30 days	
Myanmar	Visa not required	14 days	Also e-Visa for 28 days.; Holders must arrive via Yangon, Nay Pyi Taw or Mandalay airports.
Namibia	eVisa / Visa on arrival	3 months / 90 days	Visa on arrival is available at the following locations: Hosea Kutako International Airport; Impalila Island; Katima Mulilo; Ngoma; Trans Kalahari (Buitepos); Walvis Bay Airport
Nauru	Visa required		
Nepal	eVisa / Visa on arrival	90 days	
Netherlands	Visa required		
New Zealand	Visa required		May transit without visa if transit is through Auckland Airport and for no longer than 24 hours, subject to meeting character requirements and obtaining an Electronic Travel Authority prior to departure.; Holders of an Australian Permanent Resident Visa or Resident Return Visa may be granted a New Zealand Resident Visa on arrival permitting indefinite stay (pursuant to the Trans-Tasman Travel Arrangement), subject to meeting character requirements and obtaining an Electronic Travel Authority prior to departure.
Nicaragua	Visa required		
Niger	Visa required		
Nigeria	eVisa	30 days	
North Macedonia	Visa required		
Norway	Visa required		
Oman	Visa not required / eVisa	14 days / 30 days	
Pakistan	eVisa	3 months	
Palau	Free visa on arrival	30 days	
Panama	Visa not required	90 days	
Papua New Guinea	eVisa	60 days	Available at Gurney Airport (Alotau), Mount Hagen Airport, Port Moresby Airport and Tokua Airport (Rabaul).
Paraguay	Visa on arrival	15 days	
Peru	Visa not required	90 days	
Philippines	Visa not required	30 days	
Poland	Visa required		
Portugal	Visa required		
Qatar	eVisa		
Romania	Visa required		
Russia	Visa not required	30 days	
Rwanda	eVisa / Visa on arrival	30 days	
Saint Kitts and Nevis	eVisa	30 days	
Saint Lucia	Visa on arrival	42 days	
Saint Vincent and the Grenadines	Visa not required	3 months	
Samoa	Entry permit on arrival	90 days	
San Marino	Visa required		
São Tomé and Príncipe	eVisa		
Saudi Arabia	eVisa / Visa on arrival	90 days	Non-Muslim residents are prohibited from visiting Mecca and its holy sites. Other religious places may also be restricted to Non-Muslim people.
Senegal	Visa on arrival	1 month	
Serbia	eVisa	90 days	90 days within any 180-day period. Transfers allowed.; Visa-free for a maximum stay of 90 days for valid visa holders or residents of the European Union member states and the United States.
Seychelles	Electronic Border System	3 months	Application can be submitted up to 30 days before travel.; Visitors must upload a reservation confirmation(s) for each visitor's location of stay in Seychelles.; Yellow fever vaccination certificate is required if coming from endemic countries.; Payment of the fee (EUR 10) by credit or debit card.; Valid for one journey only and it expires once exit the country.
Sierra Leone	eVisa / Visa on arrival	3 months / 30 days	
Singapore	Visa not required	30 days	
Slovakia	Visa required		
Slovenia	Visa required		
Solomon Islands	Free Visitor's Permit on arrival	3 months	Visitors may obtain a free permit valid for 3 months within any 1-year period on arrival.
Somalia	eVisa	30 days	
South Africa	Visa not required	30 days	
South Sudan	eVisa		Obtainable online 30 days single entry for 100 USD, 90 days multiple entry for 200 USD and 180 days multiple entry for 350 USD.; Printed visa authorization must be presented at the time of travel.
Spain	Visa required		
Sri Lanka	Free ETA / Visa on arrival	30 days	On 24 October 2023, Sri Lanka announced that Thai citizens are exempt from paying a fee for visas. This will be a pilot program that lasts until 30 April 2024.; Sri Lanka introduced an ETA valid for 30 days.
Sudan	Visa required		Registration for a visa is obligatory within 3 days of arrival. It can be completed at entry ports.
Suriname	Visa not required	90 days	An entrance fee of USD 50 or EUR 50 must be paid online prior to arrival.; Multiple entry e-Visa is also available.
Sweden	Visa required		
Switzerland	Visa required		
Syria	eVisa		
Tajikistan	Visa not required / eVisa	30 days / 60 days	
Tanzania	eVisa / Visa on arrival	90 days	e-Visa also available.; e-Visa holders can enter through all border points.
Timor-Leste	Visa not required	30 days	
Togo	eVisa	15 days	
Tonga	Visa required		
Trinidad and Tobago	eVisa	90 days	
Tunisia	Visa required		
Turkey	Visa not required	30 days	
Turkmenistan	Visa required		10-day visa on arrival if holding a letter of invitation provided by a company registered in Turkmenistan with a prior approval from the Foreign Ministry. Visitors can apply to extend their stay for an additional 10 days.; When transiting between two non-bordering countries, visitors can obtain a Turkmenistan transit visa for a five-day stay. This must be applied for in advance at the Turkmenistan Embassy. Visitors must also submit copies of the visas for the country of entry into Turkmenistan and the country of departure from Turkmenistan. Visa fee is 20 USD.
Tuvalu	Visa on arrival	30 days	
Uganda	eVisa	3 months	
Ukraine	eVisa	30 days	
United Arab Emirates	Visa required		May apply using 'Smart service'.
United Kingdom	Visa required		
United States	Visa required		
Uruguay	Visa required		
Uzbekistan	eVisa	30 days	5-day visa-free transit at the international airports if holding a confirmed onward ticket for a flight to a third country.
Vanuatu	Visa not required	120 days	
Vatican City	Visa required		
Venezuela	eVisa		
Vietnam	Visa not required	30 days	
Yemen	Visa required		Yemen introduced an e-Visa system for visitors who meet certain eligibility requirements (group travel of 10 or more people, business trips, and transit etc.).
Zambia	eVisa / Visa on arrival	90 days	
Zimbabwe	eVisa	1 month	

== Territories and disputed areas ==
Visa requirements for Thai citizens for visits to various territories, disputed areas, partially recognized countries and restricted zones:

Visitor to	Visa requirement	Notes (excluding departure fees)
Europe
Abkhazia	Visa required	Tourists from all countries (except Georgia) can visit Abkhazia for a period not exceeding 24 hours as part of an organized tourist group.
Mount Athos	Special permit required	Special permit required (4 days: 25 euro for Orthodox visitors, 35 euro for non-Orthodox visitors, 18 euro for students). There is a visitors' quota: maximum 100 Orthodox and 10 non-Orthodox per day and women are not allowed.
(Autonomous Republic of Crimea) Crimea	Visa not required	The same rules as for visiting Russia apply.
Turkish Republic of Northern Cyprus	Visa not required	3 months
(United Nations) UN Buffer Zone in Cyprus	Access Permit required	Access Permit is required for travelling inside the zone, except Civil Use Areas.
Faroe Islands	Visa required	
Gibraltar	Visa required	
Guernsey	Visa required	
Isle of Man	Visa required	
(Norway) Jan Mayen	Permit required	Permit issued by the local police required for staying for less than 24 hours and permit issued by the Norwegian police for staying for more than 24 hours.
Jersey	Visa required	
Kosovo	Visa required	Visa is not required for holders of a valid biometric residence permit issued by one of the Schengen member states or a valid multi-entry Schengen Visa, a holder of a valid Laissez-Passer issued by United Nations Organizations, NATO, OSCE, Council of Europe or European Union a holder of a valid travel documents issued by EU Member and Schengen States, United States of America, Canada, Australia and Japan based on the 1951 Convention on Refugee Status or the 1954 Convention on the Status of Stateless Persons, as well as holders of valid travel documents for foreigners (max. 15 days stay)
Russia	Special authorization required	Several closed cities and regions in Russia require special authorization.
South Ossetia	Visa required	To enter South Ossetia, visitors must have a multiple-entry visa for Russia and register their stay with the Migration Service of the Ministry of Internal Affairs within 3 days.
Transnistria	Visa not required	Visitors must complete and obtain a temporary migration card at the border checkpoint. The maximum period of stay is 45 days, and it can be extended multiple times through this card.
Africa
British Indian Ocean Territory	Special permit required	Special permit required.
Eritrea outside Asmara	Travel permit required	To travel in the rest of the country, a Travel Permit for Foreigners is required (20 Eritrean nakfa).
Mayotte	Visa required	
Réunion	Visa required	
Ascension Island	eVisa	3 months within any year period.
Saint Helena	eVisa	
Tristan da Cunha	Permission required	Permission to land required for 15/30 pounds sterling (yacht/ship passenger) for Tristan da Cunha Island or 20 pounds sterling for Gough Island, Inaccessible Island or Nightingale Islands.
Sahrawi Arab Democratic Republic	Visa regime undefined}	Undefined visa regime in the Western Sahara controlled territory.
Somaliland	Visa required	
Sudan	Travel permit required	All foreigners traveling more than 25 kilometers outside of Khartoum must obtain a travel permit.
(Sudan) Darfur	Travel permit required	Separate travel permit is required.
Asia
(China) Hainan	Visa not required	30 days. Available at Haikou Meilan International Airport and Sanya Phoenix International Airport. Visa not required for 30 days for traveling on an organized tour in a tourist group of 5 or more people.
Hong Kong	Visa not required	30 days
India PAP/RAP	PAP/RAP required	Protected Area Permit (PAP) required for all of Arunachal Pradesh, Manipur, Mizoram and parts of Himachal Pradesh, Jammu and Kashmir and Uttarakhand. Restricted Area Permit (RAP) required for all of Andaman and Nicobar Islands and Lakshadweep and parts of Sikkim. Some of these requirements are occasionally lifted for a year.
Kazakhstan	Special permission required	Special permission required for the town of Baikonur and surrounding areas in Kyzylorda Oblast, and the town of Gvardeyskiy near Almaty.
(Iran) Kish Island	Visa not required	Visitors to Kish Island do not require a visa.
Macao	Visa not required	30 days
Maldives	Permission required	With the exception of the capital Malé, tourists are generally prohibited from visiting non-resort islands without the express permission of the Government of Maldives.
North Korea outside Pyongyang	Special permit required	People are not allowed to leave the capital city, tourists can only leave the capital with a governmental tourist guide (no independent moving)
Palestine	Visa not required	Arrival by sea to Gaza Strip not allowed.
Taiwan	Visa not required	14 days (Temporary measure only; valid until 31 July 2027). Also Visitor Visa for Tourism Purposes for 30 days. Visa applications must be done online and submitted to a Taipei Economic and Cultural Office.
(Tajikistan) Gorno-Badakhshan Autonomous Province	OIVR permit required	OIVR permit required (15+5 Tajikistani Somoni) and another special permit (free of charge) is required for Lake Sarez.
United Nations Korean Demilitarized Zone	Restricted zone.	
United Nations UNDOF Zone and Ghajar	Restricted zone.	
Yemen	Special permission required	Special permission needed for travel outside Sana'a or Aden.
Caribbean and North Atlantic
Anguilla	eVisa	
Aruba	Visa required	Visa-free if U.S., U.K., Canada or Schengen Area resident permit holder or cruise ship passenger staying not more than 48 hours
Bermuda	Visa required	
(Netherlands) Bonaire, St. Eustatius and Saba	Visa required	Visa-free if U.S., U.K., Canada or Schengen Area resident permit holder or cruise ship passenger staying not more than 48 hours
British Virgin Islands	Visa required	Permanent residents of the United States, Canada or the United Kingdom do not require a visa.
Cayman Islands	Visa required	Up to 30 days visa-free for permanent residents of and traveling directly from: Canada, USA or UK. Visa-free for cruise ship passengers leaving on same day as arrival.
Curacao	Visa required	Visa-free if U.S., U.K., Canada or Schengen Area resident permit holder or cruise ship passenger staying not more than 48 hours
(France) French Guiana	Visa required	
(France) French West Indies	Visa required	French West Indies refers to Martinique, Guadeloupe, Saint Martin and Saint Barthélemy.
Greenland	Visa required	
Montserrat	eVisa	Multiple entry e-Visa valid for 1 year can be obtained through the internet, prior to departure.
Puerto Rico	Visa required	
Saint Pierre and Miquelon	Visa required	
Sint Maarten	Visa required	Visa-free if U.S., U.K., Canada or Schengen Area resident permit holder or cruise ship passenger staying not more than 48 hours
Turks and Caicos Islands	Visa required	Visa required as of 1 April 2015.
U.S. Virgin Islands	Visa required	
Oceania
American Samoa	Entry permit required	
Australia Ashmore and Cartier Islands	Special authorisation required	Special authorisation required.
France Clipperton Island	Special permit required	Special permit required.
Cook Islands	Visa not required	31 days
(Fiji) Lau Province	Special permission required	Special permission required.
French Polynesia	Visa required	
Guam	Visa required	
New Caledonia	Visa required	
Northern Mariana Islands	Visa required	
Niue	Visa not required	30 days
Pitcairn Islands	Visa not required	14 days; visa-free and landing fee 35 USD or tax of 5 USD if not going ashore.
United States Minor Outlying Islands	Special permits required	Special permits required for Baker Island, Howland Island, Jarvis Island, Johnston Atoll, Kingman Reef, Midway Atoll, Palmyra Atoll and Wake Island.
Wallis and Futuna	Visa required	
South Atlantic and Antarctica
Falkland Islands	Visa required	
South Georgia and the South Sandwich Islands	Permit required	Pre-arrival permit from the Commissioner required (72 hours/1 month for 110/160 pounds sterling).
Antarctica		Special permits required for British Antarctic Territory, French Southern and Antarctic Lands, Argentine Antarctica, (Australia) Australian Antarctic Territory, Bouvet Island, (Antártica Chilena Province) Chilean Antarctic Territory, (Australia) Heard Island and McDonald Islands, (Norway) Peter I Island, (Norway) Queen Maud Land, (New Zealand) Ross Dependency.

== APEC Business Travel Card ==
Full members of the scheme Transitional members (United States, Canada)

Holders of an APEC Business Travel Card (ABTC) travelling on business do not require a visa to the following countries:

- Australia^{2}
- Brunei^{2}
- Chile^{2}
- China^{4}
- Hong Kong^{4}
- Indonesia^{4}
- Japan^{2}
- Malaysia^{2}
- Mexico^{1}
- New Zealand^{2}
- Papua New Guinea^{4}
- Peru^{2}
- Philippines^{4}
- Russia^{3}
- Singapore^{4}
- South Korea^{2}
- Taiwan^{2}
- Vietnam^{4}

_{1 - Up to 180 days}
_{2 - Up to 90 days}
_{3 - Up to 90 days in a period of 180 days}
_{4 - Up to 60 days}

The card must be used in conjunction with a passport and has the following advantages:

- No need to apply for a visa or entry permit to APEC countries, as the card is treated as such (except by Canada and United States)
- Undertake legitimate business in participating economies
- Expedited border crossing in all member economies, including transitional members

== Non-visa restrictions ==
=== Blank passport pages ===
Many countries require a minimum number of blank pages to be available in the passport being presented, typically one or two pages. Endorsement pages, which often appear after the visa pages, are not counted as being valid or available.

=== Vaccination ===
Cover of the new International Certificate of Vaccination issued by the Bureau of Quarantine in the Philippines since 2021

The African countries of Angola, Benin, Burkina Faso, Burundi, Cameroon, Central African Republic, Democratic Republic of the Congo, Republic of the Congo, Côte d'Ivoire, Gabon, Ghana, Guinea-Bissau, Mali, Niger, Sierra Leone and Togo, South Sudan and Uganda, along with French Guiana in South America, require all incoming passengers older than nine months to one year, to have a current International Certificate of Vaccination or Prophylaxis.

Some other countries require vaccination only if the passenger is coming from an infected area or has visited one recently or has transited for 12 hours in those countries: Algeria, Botswana, Cabo Verde, Chad, Djibouti, Egypt, Eswatini, Ethiopia, Gambia, Ghana, Guinea, Lesotho, Libya, Equatorial Guinea, Eritrea, Madagascar, Malawi, Mauritania, Mauritius, Mozambique, Namibia, Nigeria, Papua New Guinea, Seychelles, Somalia, South Africa, Sudan, Tunisia, Uganda, Tanzania, Zambia and Zimbabwe.

=== Passport validity length ===
Very few countries, such as Paraguay, just require a valid passport on arrival.

However many countries and groupings now require only an identity card – especially from their neighbours. Other countries may have special bilateral arrangements that depart from the generality of their passport validity length policies to shorten the period of passport validity required for each other's citizens or even accept passports that have already expired (but not been cancelled).

Some countries, such as Japan, Ireland and the United Kingdom, require a passport valid throughout the period of the intended stay.

In the absence of specific bilateral agreements, countries requiring passports to be valid for at least 6 more months on arrival include Afghanistan, Algeria, Anguilla, Bahrain, Bhutan, Botswana, British Virgin Islands, Brunei, Cambodia, Cameroon, Cape Verde, Cayman Islands, Central African Republic, Chad, Comoros, Costa Rica, Côte d'Ivoire, Curaçao, Ecuador, Egypt, El Salvador, Equatorial Guinea, Fiji, Gabon, Guinea Bissau, Guyana, Haiti, India, Indonesia, Iran, Iraq, Israel, Jordan, Kenya, Kiribati, Kuwait, Laos, Madagascar, Malaysia, Marshall Islands, Mongolia, Myanmar, Namibia, Nepal, Nicaragua, Nigeria, Oman, Palau, Papua New Guinea, Peru, Philippines, Qatar, Rwanda, Samoa, Saudi Arabia, Singapore, Solomon Islands, Somalia, Sri Lanka, Sudan, Suriname, Tanzania, Thailand, Timor-Leste, Tokelau, Tonga, Turkey, Tuvalu, Uganda, United Arab Emirates, Vanuatu, Venezuela, and Vietnam.

Countries requiring passports valid for at least 4 months on arrival include Micronesia and Zambia.

Countries requiring passports with a validity of at least 3 months beyond the date of intended departure include Azerbaijan, Bosnia and Herzegovina, Honduras, Montenegro, Nauru, Moldova and New Zealand. Similarly, the EEA countries of Iceland, Liechtenstein, Norway, all European Union countries (except Ireland) together with Switzerland also require 3 months validity beyond the date of the bearer's intended departure unless the bearer is an EEA or Swiss national.

Countries requiring passports valid for at least 3 months on arrival include Albania, North Macedonia, Panama, and Senegal.

Bermuda requires passports to be valid for at least 45 days upon entry.

Countries that require a passport validity of at least one month beyond the date of intended departure include Eritrea, Hong Kong, Lebanon, Macau, the Maldives and South Africa.

==== Maximum passport age ====
Countries of the Schengen area require non-EU passports to be less than 10 years old upon entry.

=== Criminal record ===
Some countries, including Australia, Canada, Fiji, New Zealand and the United States, routinely deny entry to non-citizens who have a criminal record, while others impose restrictions depending on the type of conviction and the length of the sentence.

=== Persona non grata ===
The government of a country can declare a diplomat persona non grata, banning them from entering the country or expelling them if they have already entered. In non-diplomatic use, the authorities of a country may also declare a foreigner persona non grata permanently or temporarily, usually because of unlawful activity.

=== Israeli stamps ===
Kuwait, Lebanon, Libya, and Yemen do not allow entry to people with passport stamps from Israel or whose passports have either a used or an unused Israeli visa, or where there is evidence of previous travel to Israel such as entry or exit stamps from neighbouring border posts in transit countries such as Jordan and Egypt.

To circumvent this Arab League boycott of Israel, the Israeli immigration services have now mostly ceased to stamp foreign nationals' passports on either entry to or exit from Israel (unless the entry is for some work-related purposes). Since 15 January 2013, Israel no longer stamps foreign passports at Ben Gurion Airport. Passports are still (as of 22 June 2017) stamped at Erez when passing into and out of Gaza.

Iran refuses admission to holders of passports containing an Israeli visa or stamp that is less than 12 months old.

=== Biometrics ===
Several countries mandate that all travellers, or all foreign travellers, be fingerprinted on arrival and will refuse admission to or even arrest travellers who refuse to comply. In some countries, such as the United States, this may apply even to transit passengers who merely wish to change planes rather than go landside.

Fingerprinting countries/regions include Afghanistan, Argentina, Brunei, Cambodia, China, Ethiopia, Ghana, Guinea, India, Japan, Kenya (both fingerprints and a photo are taken), Malaysia upon entry and departure, Mongolia, Saudi Arabia, the Schengen Area, Singapore, South Korea, Taiwan, Thailand, Uganda, the United Arab Emirates and the United States.

Many countries also require a photo be taken of people entering the country. The United States, which does not fully implement exit control formalities at its land frontiers (although long mandated by its own legislation), intends to implement facial recognition for passengers departing from international airports to identify people who overstay their visa.

Together with fingerprint and face recognition, iris scanning is one of three biometric identification technologies internationally standardised since 2006 by the International Civil Aviation Organization (ICAO) for use in e-passports and the United Arab Emirates conducts iris scanning on visitors who need to apply for a visa. The United States Department of Homeland Security has announced plans to greatly increase the biometric data it collects at US borders. In 2018, Singapore began trials of iris scanning at three land and maritime immigration checkpoints.

== See also ==
- Visa policy of Thailand
- Thai passport
- Foreign relations of Thailand

== Notes ==
- Visa policy of Thailand
- Thai passport
