= Khlong Yai district =

Khlong Yai คลองใหญ่
- District
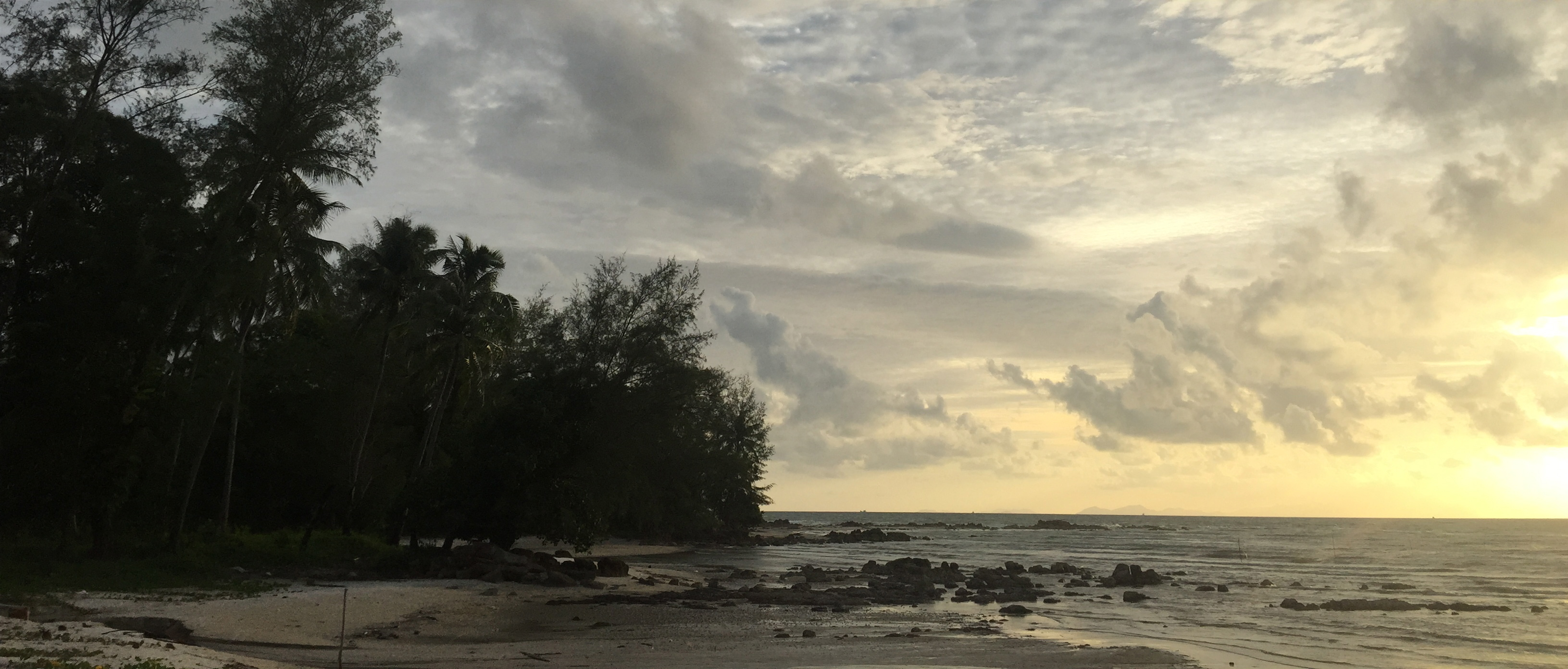
- Mai Rut Beach

- District location in Trat province
- Coordinates: 11°46′36″N 102°53′12″E
- Country: Thailand
- Province: Trat
- Seat: Khlong Yai

Area
  - Total: 50.2 km^{2} (19.4 sq mi)

Population (2000)
  - Total: 23,981
  - Density: 477.7/km^{2} (1,237/sq mi)
- Time zone: UTC+7 (ICT)
- Postal code: 23110
- Geocode: 2302

Khlong Yai (Thai: คลองใหญ่, pronounced [kʰlɔ̄ːŋ jàj], lit: 'big canal') is a district (amphoe) of Trat province, eastern Thailand. A border crossing into Cambodia is at Hat Lek, known as the Cham Yeam crossing in Koh Kong province of Cambodia. The nearest Cambodian city is Koh Kong. Thailand Route 3 (Sukhumvit Road) ends at the Cambodian border in this district.

== History ==
Khlong Yai was once part of Siam's Patchan Khiri Khet Province. The name was constructed to rhyme with Prachuap Khiri Khan province on the other side of the Gulf of Thailand at the same latitude. In 1904, most of Patchan Khiri Khet, including Trat, was ceded to France in exchange for the French returning Chantaburi to Siam. Shortly thereafter, France returned Trat and Klong Yai to Siam in exchange for Siem Reap and Battambang, which had been under Thai rule since 1795. A portion of what was Patchan Khiri Khet Province is now in Koh Kong province of Cambodia.

Klong Yai was made a minor district (king amphoe) in 1912 and upgraded to a full district in 1959.

From 1979 to July 1986, the district was the site of a Thai Red Cross refugee camp, now called "Ratchakarun Centre", for Cambodians fleeing the fighting between the Khmer Rouge and the invading Vietnamese in the Cambodian-Vietnamese War. At its peak, it harboured more than 90,000 refugees.

== Geography ==
The district is a narrow band of land along the coast to the Gulf of Thailand, separated from Cambodia by the Cardamom Mountains.

Neighboring districts are (from the north clockwise) Mueang Trat of Trat Province, Koh Kong province of Cambodia, and the Gulf of Thailand.

An international border crossing with Cambodia is at Hat Lek village at the south end of the district, called the Khlong Yai Immigration Checkpoint. The checkpoint on the Cambodian side is called Cham Yeam International Checkpoint in Cham Yeam village, Koh Kong Province.

== Administration ==
The district is divided into three sub-districts (tambons), which are further subdivided into 20 villages (mubans). There are two townships (thesaban tambon): Khlong Yai and Hat Lek both cover parts of the same-named tambon. There are two further tambon administrative organizations (TAO).

No.	Name	Thai name	Villages	Pop.
1.	Khlong Yai	คลองใหญ่	9	14,877
2.	Mai Rut	ไม้รูด	6	4,642
3.	Hat Lek	หาดเล็ก	5	4,462

== Climate ==
Climate data for Khlong Yai (1991–2020, extremes 1952-present)
Month	Jan	Feb	Mar	Apr	May	Jun	Jul	Aug	Sep	Oct	Nov	Dec	Year
Record high °C (°F)	36.1 (97.0)	35.9 (96.6)	38.2 (100.8)	35.7 (96.3)	36.2 (97.2)	34.5 (94.1)	33.7 (92.7)	34.2 (93.6)	34.2 (93.6)	35.9 (96.6)	36.1 (97.0)	35.3 (95.5)	38.2 (100.8)
Mean daily maximum °C (°F)	31.9 (89.4)	32.0 (89.6)	32.6 (90.7)	33.3 (91.9)	32.8 (91.0)	31.5 (88.7)	30.7 (87.3)	30.7 (87.3)	30.9 (87.6)	31.8 (89.2)	32.6 (90.7)	32.2 (90.0)	31.9 (89.5)
Daily mean °C (°F)	26.8 (80.2)	27.3 (81.1)	28.1 (82.6)	28.6 (83.5)	28.4 (83.1)	27.5 (81.5)	27.1 (80.8)	27.2 (81.0)	27.0 (80.6)	27.0 (80.6)	27.7 (81.9)	27.1 (80.8)	27.5 (81.5)
Mean daily minimum °C (°F)	22.2 (72.0)	22.9 (73.2)	24.2 (75.6)	24.7 (76.5)	24.8 (76.6)	24.3 (75.7)	24.0 (75.2)	24.1 (75.4)	23.8 (74.8)	23.6 (74.5)	23.5 (74.3)	22.6 (72.7)	23.7 (74.7)
Record low °C (°F)	13.0 (55.4)	15.0 (59.0)	18.2 (64.8)	19.5 (67.1)	21.0 (69.8)	21.0 (69.8)	20.7 (69.3)	20.0 (68.0)	19.5 (67.1)	18.5 (65.3)	14.5 (58.1)	15.0 (59.0)	13.0 (55.4)
Average precipitation mm (inches)	51.1 (2.01)	81.5 (3.21)	140.0 (5.51)	196.0 (7.72)	419.9 (16.53)	777.2 (30.60)	1,024.1 (40.32)	969.7 (38.18)	816.4 (32.14)	337.6 (13.29)	85.2 (3.35)	27.8 (1.09)	4,926.5 (193.96)
Average precipitation days (≥ 1.0 mm)	3.5	5.6	9.6	11.7	18.8	23.3	24.6	24.6	22.5	17.4	6.8	2.4	170.8
Average relative humidity (%)	73.0	76.8	79.3	80.3	83.1	86.5	87.3	87.6	87.2	84.5	75.3	69.8	80.9
Source: World Meteorological Organization(extremes)
