= Khlong Yai =

- Town
- Location within Thailand
- Coordinates: 11°46′30″N 102°52′3″E
- Country: Thailand
- Provinces: Trat Province
- District: Khlong Yai District
- Elevation: 6 m (20 ft)
- Time zone: UTC+7 (ICT)

Khlong Yai is a town (thesaban mueang) in Trat Province in east Thailand, capital of the Khlong Yai District, of which it covers part of the tambon Khlong Yai. It is on the coast of the Gulf of Thailand near the border with Cambodia.

== Geography ==
Khlong Yai is found on a thin strip of territory belonging to Thailand along the coast of the Gulf of Thailand. The border with Cambodia runs roughly parallel to the coast at a distance of roughly 2 kilometres (1.2 mi), following the Cardamom Mountains. The high rainfall of the area results in dense rain forest along this narrow coastal strip. The hills nearest to Khlong Yai reach to about 300 metres (980 ft), but further north the height of the mountains exceeds 1,000 metres (3,300 ft).

== Climate ==
Khlong Yai has a tropical monsoon climate (Köppen Am) influenced by the nearby Cardamom Mountains, which amplify the summer monsoon. While no month is truly dry, a short dry season runs from December to January. Rain increases somewhat from February to April, and then the main monsoon season begins in May, lasting until October. The monsoon season features torrential rain, with over 1,000 millimetres (39 in) falling in August alone, and over 800 millimetres (31 in) falling in each of June and July. The rains ease in November, although significant rainfall may still occur. The highest monthly rainfall recorded from 1961 to 1990 was a total of 2,072.4 millimetres (81.59 in) in August.

Climate data for Khlong Yai (1981–2010)
Month	Jan	Feb	Mar	Apr	May	Jun	Jul	Aug	Sep	Oct	Nov	Dec	Year
Record high °C (°F)	36.1 (97.0)	35.7 (96.3)	38.2 (100.8)	35.6 (96.1)	36.0 (96.8)	34.5 (94.1)	33.7 (92.7)	34.2 (93.6)	34.2 (93.6)	35.9 (96.6)	36.1 (97.0)	35.3 (95.5)	38.2 (100.8)
Mean daily maximum °C (°F)	31.5 (88.7)	31.7 (89.1)	32.4 (90.3)	33.2 (91.8)	32.6 (90.7)	31.3 (88.3)	30.7 (87.3)	30.5 (86.9)	30.9 (87.6)	31.5 (88.7)	32.2 (90.0)	31.7 (89.1)	31.7 (89.1)
Daily mean °C (°F)	26.5 (79.7)	27.2 (81.0)	27.9 (82.2)	28.5 (83.3)	28.2 (82.8)	27.4 (81.3)	27.0 (80.6)	27.0 (80.6)	26.9 (80.4)	26.8 (80.2)	27.3 (81.1)	26.8 (80.2)	27.3 (81.1)
Mean daily minimum °C (°F)	21.8 (71.2)	23.0 (73.4)	24.0 (75.2)	24.6 (76.3)	24.7 (76.5)	24.1 (75.4)	23.9 (75.0)	24.0 (75.2)	23.8 (74.8)	23.4 (74.1)	23.2 (73.8)	22.1 (71.8)	23.6 (74.5)
Record low °C (°F)	16.4 (61.5)	17.2 (63.0)	18.2 (64.8)	19.5 (67.1)	21.0 (69.8)	21.0 (69.8)	20.7 (69.3)	20.0 (68.0)	19.5 (67.1)	18.5 (65.3)	16.8 (62.2)	15.8 (60.4)	15.8 (60.4)
Average rainfall mm (inches)	37.2 (1.46)	86.0 (3.39)	115.3 (4.54)	185.4 (7.30)	426.7 (16.80)	829.9 (32.67)	971.6 (38.25)	1,040.4 (40.96)	681.0 (26.81)	377.4 (14.86)	73.6 (2.90)	21.3 (0.84)	4,845.8 (190.78)
Average rainy days	4.4	7.2	10.8	14.4	22.2	25.5	26.3	27.5	24.6	21.1	9.1	2.9	196.0
Average relative humidity (%)	73	77	79	80	83	87	87	87	87	85	75	69	81
Mean monthly sunshine hours	229.4	180.8	201.5	183.0	155.0	114.0	117.8	58.9	108.0	145.7	189.0	229.4	1,912.5
Mean daily sunshine hours	7.4	6.4	6.5	6.1	5.0	3.8	3.8	1.9	3.6	4.7	6.3	7.4	5.2
Source 1: Thai Meteorological Department
Source 2: Office of Water Management and Hydrology, Royal Irrigation Department (sun and humidity)

== Transport ==
The main road in the area is Route 318, which runs up and down the coast. To the south it connect Khlong Yai to a border crossing to Cambodia at Hat Lek, not far from the Cambodian town of Koh Kong. To north the road connects to Trat, from which Route 3 (the Sukhumvit Road) leads to Bangkok.
