= Thai identity card =

National identity card of Thailand

Thai national identity card (บัตรประจำตัวประชาชนไทย)
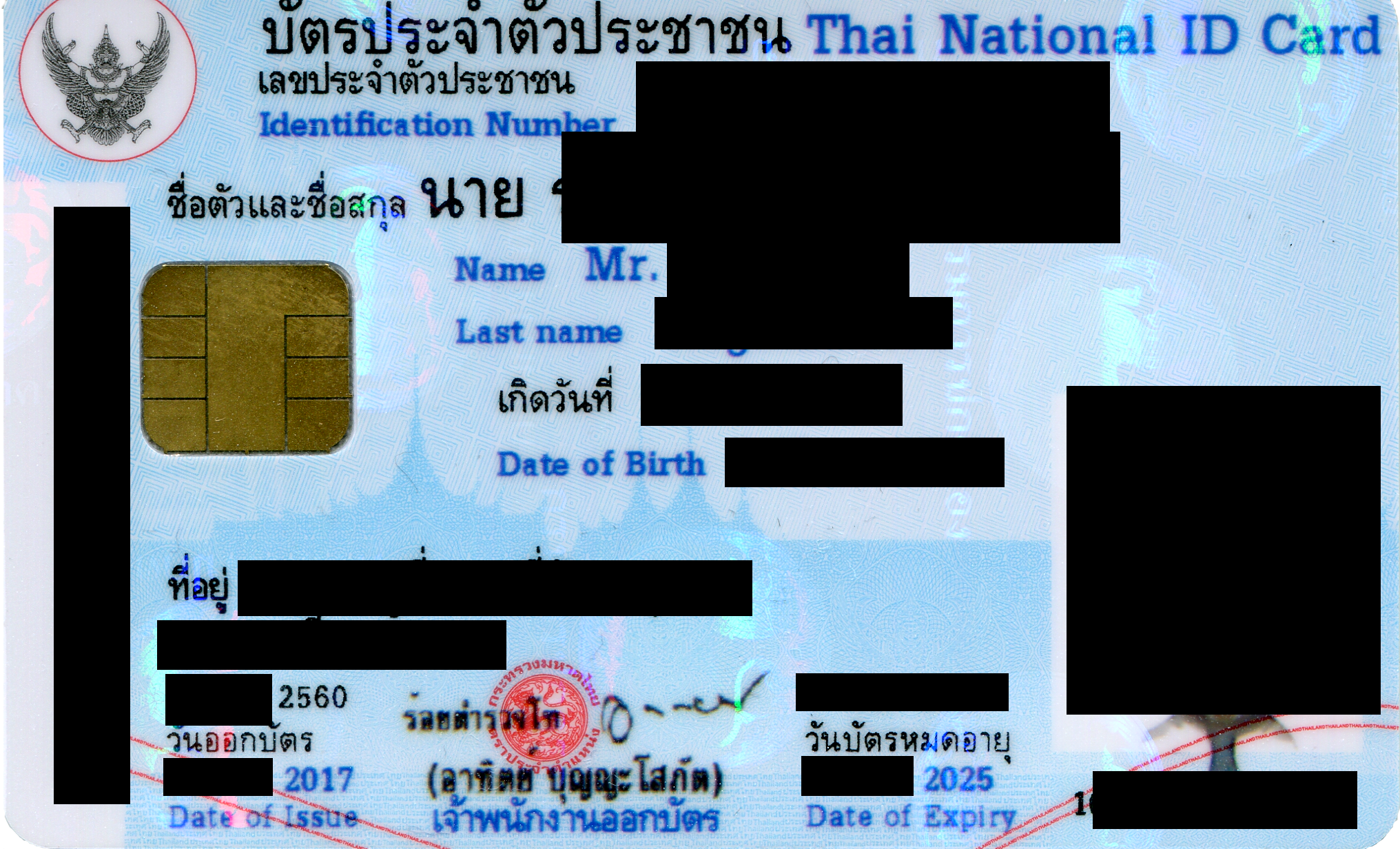
- A sample of obverse of Thai national ID card. (the 5th generation)
- Type: Identity card
- Issued by: Thailand; Department of Provincial Administration, Ministry of the Interior.
- Valid in: Thailand
- Eligibility: Thai citizenship
- Expiration: 8 years (Card does not expire after the holder is older than 70 years old.)
- Cost: Free or 100 baht in case of lost, damaged card, or changes in personal information

The Thai identity card (Thai: บัตรประจำตัวประชาชนไทย; Thai pronunciation: [bàt.pràtɕam.tuə.pràtɕʰaː.tɕʰon.tʰaj]; RTGS: bat pracham tua pracha chon thai) is an official identity document issued to Thai nationals between the age of 7 and 70 years. It was first introduced in 1943 when Plaek Phibunsongkram was the Prime Minister. The minimum age was originally 16 years but later lowered to 15 in 1983 and 7 in 2011.

The card is used for proving the holder's identity and receiving government services. Other private services, such as applying for a mobile phone contract or opening a bank account, also require a production of valid identity card. Failure to produce a card without good reasons can result in up to ฿200 fine.

== History ==
Prior to the introduction of an identification card in 1943, anyone who wanted to travel can apply for an internal passport at the district office. However, the law was rarely enforced until 1943, when a compulsory identification book law was enacted. Thai nationals who were 16 and older and lived within designated areas were required to have an identification book, similar to the existing internal passport.

In 1963, an identification book was replaced by a smaller laminated paper card featuring holder's photo with height scale. All personal information was typewritten on the obverse side. Date of issue and expiry were typed on the reverse. The cost charged was ฿5 (around ฿90 today) for any issuance, whether of a new card or a replacement. It was at this time that identification cards became legally required by every Thai citizen. However, the card could be forged easily as there was no security features. It could also be damaged easily due to being made with paper.

With the introduction of microfilm, dot matrix printer and mainframe computer, the 1963 card became obsolete in 1987. At that time, Thai nationals were assigned unique 13-digit personal numbers that integrated the card issuance with other registrations. Thai nationals who turned 15 had to apply for a card in person at a district office. The card production was centralized; this meant all application forms and thumb prints had to be microfilmed and submitted to the registration administration bureau in Bangkok for further processing. The card was made of paper printed by dot matrix printer and laminated with special coating.

In 1996, all identification cards issued in Bangkok were printed on site using a computer system. Outside Bangkok, on the other hand, a registrar had to submit paper forms for manual processing. Since then, the card issuing system was subsequently implemented nationwide. However, the information provided on the card is all in Thai; one had to translate the card for use in foreign countries. As a result, in 2005, a bilingual national identification card was adopted and is still in use today.

In 2011, the government led by Abhisit Vejjajiva proposed that the minimum age for identification card should be reduced from 15 to 7 years, in order to reduce the use of birth certificate and other evidence for children.

== Identification number ==
In 1909, the Thai government launched a census surveying people across the country, including immigrants, for the purpose of taxation and conscription. The system was simple and home owners were not obliged to register an entry. Eight years later, home owners in selected areas were required to register deaths and births in their home to authorities The law was then expanded nationwide in 1956. Despite the existence of a citizen register, there was no unique identification number for a person. This later raised a security problem, especially when communism expanded into Thailand. Foreign criminals might forge identification cards and personal records relatively easily.

On 19 September 1985, the Central Bureau of Registration (now the Bureau of Registration Administration) was established and a 13-digit national identification number was introduced. The structure of the Thai identification number is:

$x_1 - x_2 x_3 x_4 x_5 - x_6 x_7 x_8 x_9 x_{10} - x_{11} x_{12} - x_{13}$

The meaning of each section is as follows: x_{1} denotes the category of the particular person, which can either be:

Category	Description
0	(Not found on cards of Thai nationals but may be found in the other issued identity cards below)
1	Thai nationals who were born after 1 January 1984 and had their birth notified within the given deadline (15 days).
2	Thai nationals who were born after 1 January 1984 but failed to have their birth notified in time.
3	Thai nationals or foreign nationals with identification cards who were born and whose names were included in a house registration book before 1 January 1984
4	Thai nationals who were born before 1 January 1984 but were not included in a house registration book at that time, for example due to moving residences
5	Thai nationals who missed the official census or other special cases, for instance those of dual nationality
6	Foreign nationals who are living in Thailand temporarily and illegal migrants
7	Children of people of category 6 who were born in Thailand
8	Foreign nationals who are living in Thailand permanently or Thai nationals by naturalization

x_{2}x_{3}x_{4}x_{5} stands for the ISO 3166-2 code for the registrar's office. $x_6 x_7 x_8 x_9 x_{10} - x_{11} x_{12}$ is either the birth certificate number, which comprises book number and sheet ID, or a personal number (for people who were born before 1 January 1984). Finally x_{13} denotes a checksum.

An identification number appears on all identification cards, house registration books and other official documents. It helps identify different people who might share the same name as well as aids legal enforcement.

== Format ==
The identification card comprises basic information on the holder, including

- Identification number
- Title, given and family name;
- Date of birth
- Religion
- Address
- Date of issue
- Date of expiry, 8 years after issue date on cardholder's birthday
- Photo of the card holder

All entries except the address and religion are provided in both Thai and English and printed on bluish white card. In addition to this, the issuer's signature and seal is printed on the same side of the card. Prior to 2005, all information was given in Thai only. The issuer's signature was on the reverse side as there was not enough space.

== Other identity documents ==
- Identity card for person without Thai nationality (Thai: บัตรประจำตัวคนซึ่งไม่มีสัญชาติไทย)
- Identity card for person without registration status (Thai: บัตรประจำตัวบุคคลที่ไม่มีสถานะทางทะเบียน)

== See also ==
- List of national identity card policies by country
