= Thailand Digital Arrival Card =

Method of electronic travel authorization in Thailand

Thailand Digital Arrival Card (TDAC) is an arrival card system required for all foreign nationals entering Thailand by land, air, and sea since 1 May 2025. The digital authorization replaces previous use of a TM6 paper arrival card.

== Background ==
Prior to the Covid-19 pandemic, the paper TM6 (Thai: ตม.6) form was used for all foreign arrivals entering Thailand. In June 2022, the usage of the form was suspended to reduce immigration backlogs following Thailand's reopening to foreign travelers. The extension was renewed several times, with the final extension expiring 30 April 2025.

TDAC is a digital version of the TM6 form, but with some new questions added regarding travel plans and health status.

Although there has been some confusion among airlines and across social media, the TDAC system is not in fact an ETA travel authorization program, and is merely to streamline Thai immigration checkpoints.

== Online submission ==
Preliminary TDAC submissions were accepted on the official website Thailand Digital Arrival Card (TDAC) from 28 April 2025, and the online form has been required for all foreign travelers since 1 May 2025.

Travelers are required to complete the form no more than 72 hours (3 days) prior to their arrival in Thailand. Mandatory online questions require information about passport details, personal and financial information, travel plans, accommodations in Thailand, recently visited countries, and health status.

== TDAC scams ==
On the same day that the TDAC system launched, 1 May 2025, Thai Immigration police warned travelers on social media to watch out for fake TDAC websites that look official, but are charging money for the TDAC arrival card submission and collecting sensitive data from travelers.

In early June 2025, due to ongoing confusion and black hat manipulation of Google search results by scammers, Thai Immigration, with the help of the Thai Tourist Police and various Thai embassies around the world, once again warned travelers in a large social media campaign to avoid TDAC scam websites and only use the official TDAC website.
