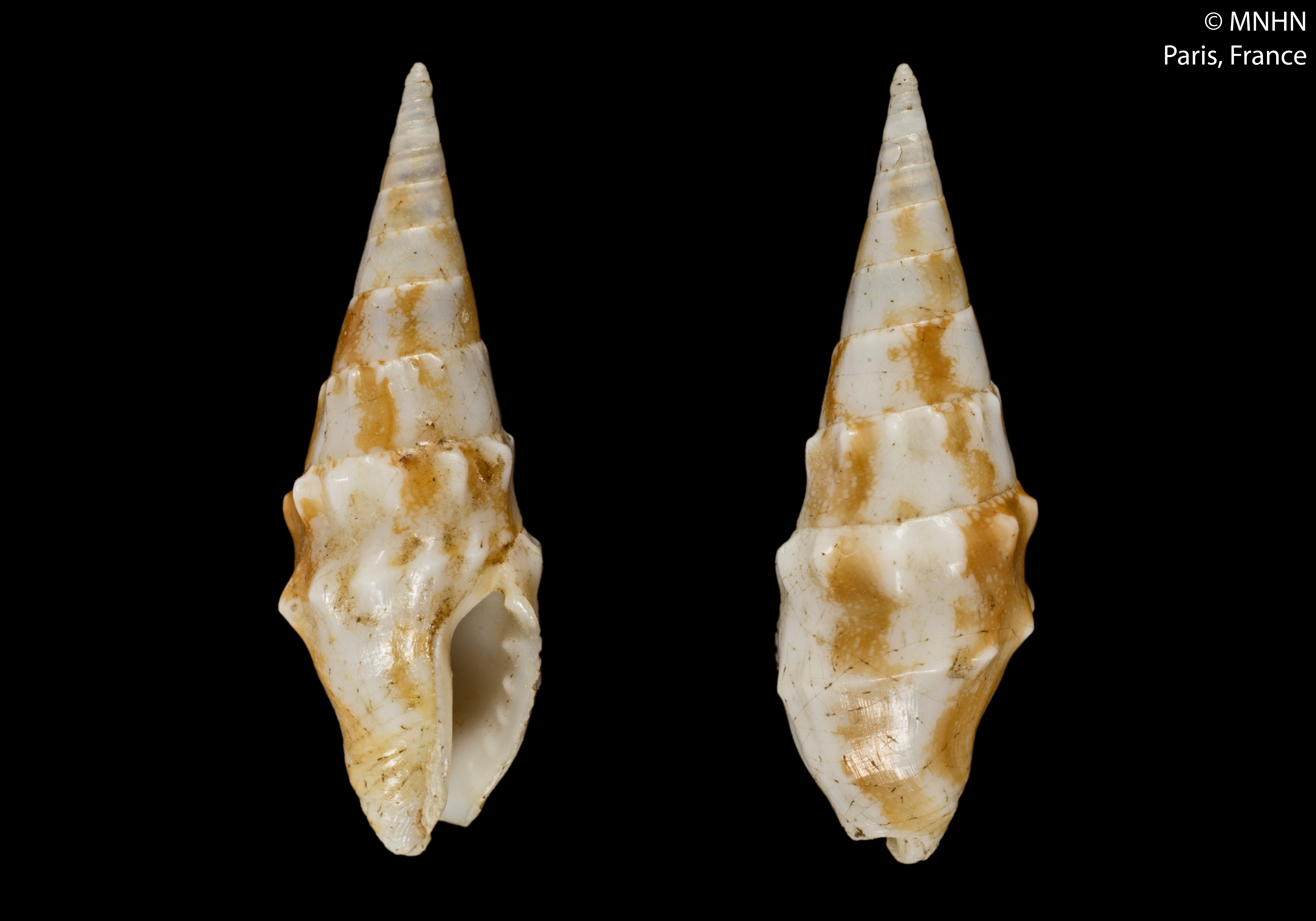
- Shell of Strombina maculosa (syntype at MNHN, Paris)

Scientific classification
- Kingdom: Animalia
- Phylum: Mollusca
- Class: Gastropoda
- Subclass: Caenogastropoda
- Order: Neogastropoda
- Superfamily: Buccinoidea
- Family: Columbellidae
- Genus: Strombina; Mörch, 1852

Type species
- Columbella lanceolata G. B. Sowerby I, 1832

Synonyms
- Columbella (Strombina) Mörch, 1852 (original rank); † Strombina (Arayina) P. Jung, 1989 alternate representation; Strombina (Costangula) P. Jung, 1989 · alternate representation; Strombina (Lirastrombina) P. Jung, 1989 · alternate representation; Strombina (Recurvina) P. Jung, 1989 · alternate representation; Strombina (Spiralta) P. Jung, 1986 · alternate representation; Strombina (Strombina) Mörch, 1852 · alternate representation; Strombocolumbus Cossmann, 1901 (unnecessary nom. nov. pro Strombina "Mörch, 1859" [sic! should be 1852], erroneously believed by Cossmann to be a junior homonym of "Strombina Bronn, 1849", which is in fact a family-group name based on Strombus)

= Strombina =

Genus of gastropods

Strombina is a genus of sea snails, marine gastropod mollusks in the family Columbellidae, the dove snails.

== Species ==
The following species are included in the genus Strombina

- Strombina angularis Sowerby, 1832 - West America
- † Strombina arayana J. Gibson-Smith, 1974
- Strombina bonita A. M. Strong & J. G. Hertlein, 1937 - West America
- Strombina carmencita Lowe, 1935 - West America
- Strombina colpoica W. H. Dall, 1916 - West America
- Strombina descendens (Martens, 1904)
- Strombina francesae Gibson-Smith & Gibson-Smith - Venezuela
- Strombina fusinoidea W. H. Dall, 1916 - West America
- Strombina lanceolata Sowerby, 1832 - West America
- Strombina lilacina W. H. Dall, 1916 - West America
- Strombina maculosa Sowerby, 1832 - West America
- Strombina marksi J. G. Hertlein & A. M. Strong, 1951 - West America
- Strombina paenoblita Jung, 1989
- Strombina pavonina R. B. Hinds, 1844 West America
- Strombina pulcherrima Sowerby, 1832 - West America
- Strombina pumilio L. A. Reeve, 1859 - America
- Strombina pungens A. A. Gould, 1859 - Indo-Pacific
- Strombina recurva Sowerby, 1832 - West America
- Strombina solidula L. A. Reeve, 1849 - West America

Species brought into synonymy

- Strombina argentea Houbrick - Dominica : synonym of Cotonopsis argentea (Houbrick, 1983)
- Strombina blignautae (Kilburn, 1998): synonym of Suturoglypta blignautae (Kilburn, 1998)
- Strombina caboblanquensis Weisbord, 1962- Caribbean : synonym of Strombina pumilio (Reeve, 1859)
- Strombina clavulus G.B. Sowerby I, 1834 - West America: synonym of Clavistrombina clavulus (G. B. Sowerby I, 1834)
- Strombina crassiparva Jung, 1989 - Galápagos Islands: synonym of Cotonopsis crassiparva P. Jung, 1989
- Strombina deroyae W. K. Emerson & A. d'Attilio, 1969 - West America : synonym of Cotonopsis deroyae (Emerson & d'Attilio, 1969)
- Strombina dorsata G.B. Sowerby I, 1832 - West America: synonym of Sincola dorsata (G. B. Sowerby I, 1832)
- Strombina edentula W. H. Dall, 1908 - West America : synonym of Cotonopsis edentula (Dall, 1908)
- Strombina elegans Sowerby, 1832 - West America : synonym of Cotonopsis turrita (G.B. Sowerby, 1832)
- Strombina galba Weisbord, 1962 - Caribbean: synonym of Mazatlania cosentini Philippi, 1836
- Strombina gibberula G.B. Sowerby I, 1832 - West America: synonym of Sincola gibberula (G. B. Sowerby I, 1832)
- Strombina hirundo Gaskoin, 1852 - North Pacific: synonym of Cotonopsis hirundo (Gaskoin, 1852)
- Strombina laevistriata Li, 1930 † : synonym of Cosmioconcha modesta (Powys, 1835)
- Strombina lindae Petuch, 1989 accepted as Cotonopsis lindae (Petuch, 1989)
- Strombina mendozana Shasky, 1970 - West America : synonym of Cotonopsis mendozana (Shasky, 1970)
- Strombina monfilsi Emerson, 1993 : synonym of Cotonopsis monfilsi (Emerson, 1993)
- Strombina paceana W. H. Dall, 1916 - West America : synonym of Strombina maculosa (G.B. Sowerby, 1832)
- Strombina panacostaricensis Olsson, 1942 : synonym of Cotonopsis panacostaricensis (Olsson, 1942)
- Strombina phuketensis Kosuge, Roussy & Muangman, 1998 : synonym of Cotonopsis phuketensis (Kosuge, Roussy & Muangman, 1998)
- Strombina sinuata G.B. Sowerby III, 1875 - West America: synonym of Sincola sinuata (G. B. Sowerby III, 1875)
- Strombina terquemi Jousseaume, 1876 : synonym of Strombina pumilio (Reeve, 1859)
- Strombina turrita G.B. Sowerby I, 1832 - West America: synonym of Cotonopsis turrita (G. B. Sowerby I, 1832)
