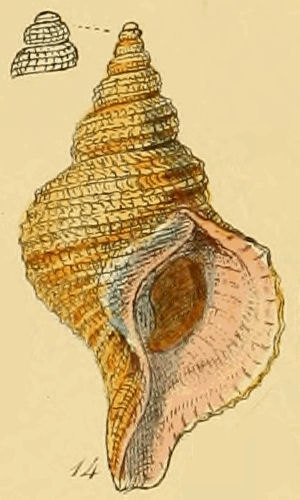
- Troschelia berniciensis shell

Scientific classification
- Kingdom: Animalia
- Phylum: Mollusca
- Class: Gastropoda
- Subclass: Caenogastropoda
- Order: Neogastropoda
- Superfamily: Buccinoidea
- Family: Buccinidae
- Genus: Troschelia; Mörch, 1876

Type species
- Fusus berniciensis W. King, 1846

Synonyms
- Boreofusus G. O. Sars, 1878

= Troschelia =

Genus of gastropods

Troschelia is a genus of sea snails, marine gastropod mollusks in the family Buccinidae, the true whelks.

== Species ==
Species within the genus Troschelia include:

- Troschelia berniciensis (King, 1846)

Synonyms

- Troschelia (Thalassoplanes) Dall, 1908: synonym of Thalassoplanes Dall, 1908
- Troschelia (Thalassoplanes) moerchii Dall, 1908: synonym of Thalassoplanes moerchii (Dall, 1908) (basionym)
- Troschelia moerchii Dall, 1908: synonym of Thalassoplanes moerchii (Dall, 1908) (original combination)
