= Oxynoe azuropunctata =

Scientific classification
- Kingdom: Animalia
- Phylum: Mollusca
- Class: Gastropoda
- Superorder: Sacoglossa
- Family: Oxynoidae
- Genus: Oxynoe
- Species: O. azuropunctata

Binomial name
- Oxynoe azuropunctata Jensen, 1980

Species of gastropod

Oxynoe azuropunctata is a species of small sea snail or sea slug, a bubble snail, a marine gastropod mollusk in the family Oxynoidae.

== Distribution ==
Oxynoe azuropunctata is found in the Western Atlantic from the United States to Canada. The species was described from Florida Keys; the type locality for this species is Florida.

== Feeding habits ==
Food: Caulerpa paspaloides, Caulerpa cupressoides and Caulerpa sertularioides.
