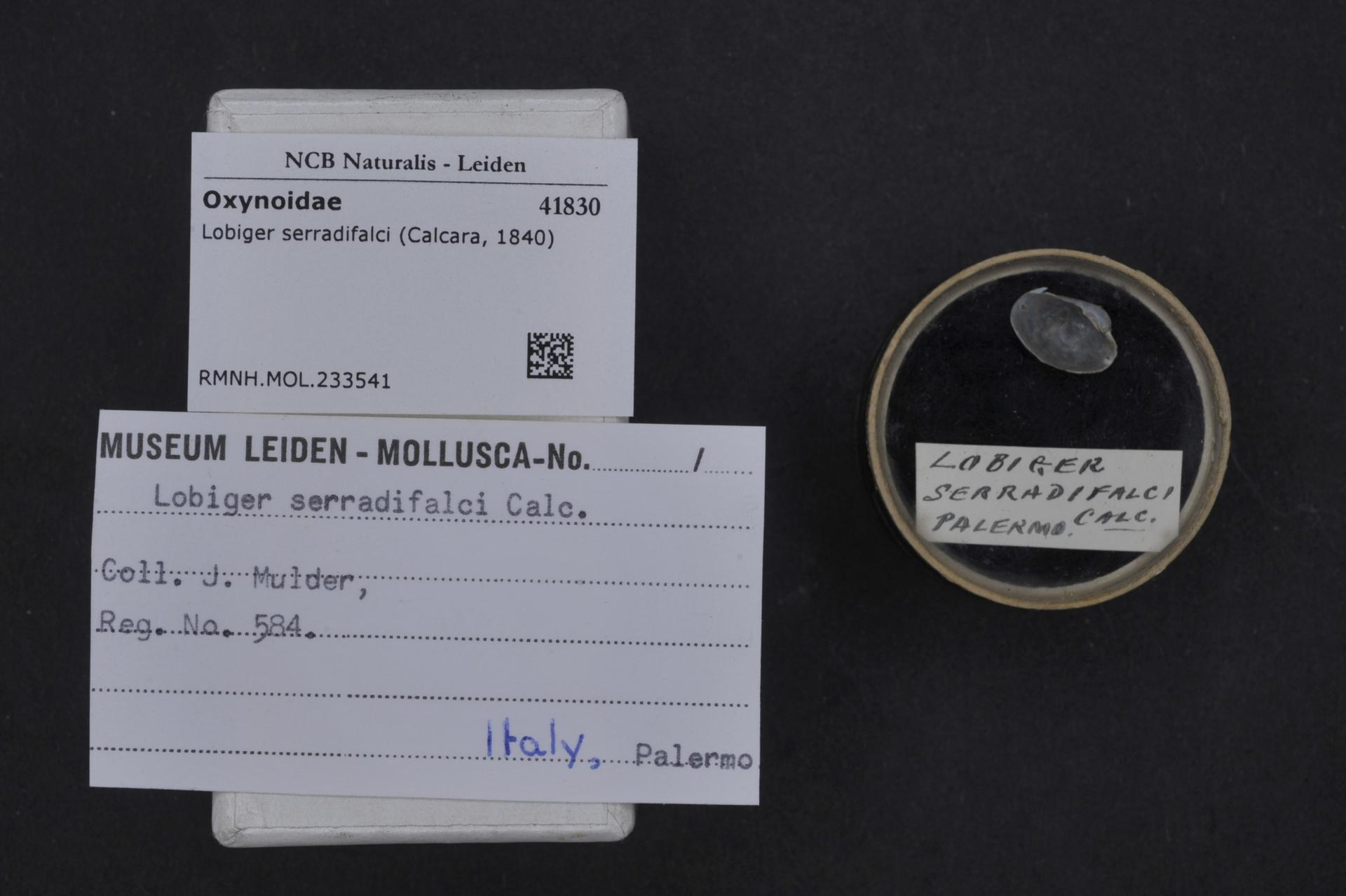

Scientific classification
- Domain: Eukaryota
- Kingdom: Animalia
- Phylum: Mollusca
- Class: Gastropoda
- Family: Oxynoidae
- Genus: Lobiger
- Species: L. serradifalci

Binomial name
- Lobiger serradifalci Calcara, 1840

= Lobiger serradifalci =

Species of gastropod

Lobiger serradifalci is a species of small sea snail or sea slug, a marine gastropod mollusk in the family Oxynoidae.

== Distribution ==
The type locality for this species is Sicily, Italy.

== Life habits ==
This species feeds on the invasive algae Caulerpa taxifolia.
