= Turbonilla erythrosclera =

Scientific classification
- Kingdom: Animalia
- Phylum: Mollusca
- Class: Gastropoda
- Family: Pyramidellidae
- Genus: Turbonilla
- Species: T. erythrosclera

Binomial name
- Turbonilla erythrosclera (Mörch, 1875)

Synonyms
- Chemnitzia (Elusa) erythrosclera Mörch, 1875 (basionym)

Species of gastropod

Turbonilla erythrosclera is a species of sea snail, a marine gastropod mollusk in the family Pyramidellidae, the pyrams and their allies.

== Description ==
The length of the shell attains 4 mm.

== Distribution ==
This marine species occurs of St. Thomas, Virgin Islands, Lesser Antilles.
