= Turbonilla krebsii =

Scientific classification
- Kingdom: Animalia
- Phylum: Mollusca
- Class: Gastropoda
- Family: Pyramidellidae
- Genus: Turbonilla
- Species: T. krebsii

Binomial name
- Turbonilla krebsii (Mörch, 1875)

Synonyms
- Chemnitzia krebsii Mörch, 1875; Chemnitzia pinguis Mörch, 1875; Turbonilla palmerae Aguayo & Jaume, 1936; Turbonilla (Chemnitzia) krebsii (Mørch, O.A.L., 1875); Turbonilla (Pyrgiscus) palmerae Aguayo, C.G. & M.L. Jaume, 1936; Pyrgiscus palmerae Aguayo & Jaume, 1936

Species of gastropod

Turbonilla krebsii is a species of sea snail, a marine gastropod mollusk in the family Pyramidellidae, the pyrams and their allies.

== Description ==
The length of the shell varies between 4 mm and 6 mm.

== Distribution ==
This marine species occurs in the following locations:

- Caribbean Sea : Cuba
- Gulf of Mexico
- Lesser Antilles: Virgin Islands
- Atlantic Ocean: Bahamas, Brazil
