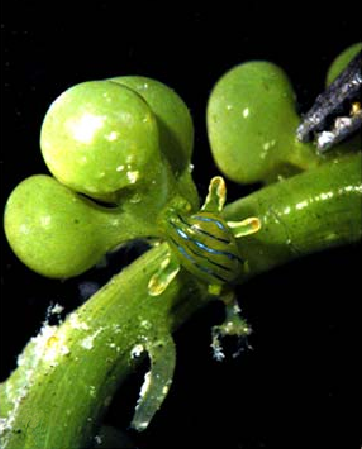
- Lobiger viridis on Caulerpa sp. Locality: Lizard Island, Great Barrier Reef. The length of the slug is about 0.5 cm.

Scientific classification
- Domain: Eukaryota
- Kingdom: Animalia
- Phylum: Mollusca
- Class: Gastropoda
- Family: Oxynoidae
- Genus: Lobiger; Krohn, 1847

Type species
- Lobiger philippii Krohn, 1847

= Lobiger =

Genus of gastropods

Lobiger is a genus of small sea snails, marine gastropod mollusks in the family Oxynoidae.

== Species ==
Species within the genus Lobiger include the following species:

- Lobiger nevilli Pilsbry, 1896
- Lobiger sagamiensis Baba, 1952
- Lobiger serradifalci (Calcara, 1840)
- Lobiger souverbii Fischer, 1856
- Lobiger viridis Pease, 1863 - nomen nudum: Lobiger nevilli Pilsbry, 1896

Note: Malacolog Version 4.1.1. claims Lobiger viridis as a synonym for Lobiger serradifalci.

Invalid species named Lobiger include:

- Lobiger corneus Mörch, 1863
- Lobiger cumingi (A. Adams, 1850)
- Lobiger pellucidus A. Adams, 1854
- Lobiger philippi Krohn, 1847 : synonym of Lobiger serradifalci (Calcara, 1840)
- Lobiger pilsbryi Schwengel, 1941
- Lobiger picta Pease, 1868
- Lobiger viridis Nevill & Nevill, 1869
- Lobiger wilsoni Tate, 1889 : synonym of Roburnella wilsoni (Tate, 1889)
