= Oxynoe benchijigua =

Scientific classification
- Kingdom: Animalia
- Phylum: Mollusca
- Class: Gastropoda
- Superorder: Sacoglossa
- Family: Oxynoidae
- Genus: Oxynoe
- Species: O. benchijigua

Binomial name
- Oxynoe benchijigua Ortea, Moro & Espinosa, 1999

Species of gastropod

Oxynoe benchijigua is a species of small sea snail or sea slug, a bubble snail, a marine gastropod mollusk in the family Oxynoidae.

== Distribution ==
It is endemic to Canary Islands. It is known only from island La Gomera.

The type locality for this species is "Playa del Barranco de Avalos", La Gomera, Canary Islands.
