= Oxynoe kabirensis =

Scientific classification
- Kingdom: Animalia
- Phylum: Mollusca
- Class: Gastropoda
- Superorder: Sacoglossa
- Family: Oxynoidae
- Genus: Oxynoe
- Species: O. kabirensis

Binomial name
- Oxynoe kabirensis Hamatani, 1980

Species of gastropod

Oxynoe kabirensis is a species of small sea snail or sea slug, a bubble snail, a marine gastropod mollusk in the family Oxynoidae.

== Distribution ==
This species has only been found in Japan. The type locality for this species is Ishigaki Island, Ryukyu Islands.
