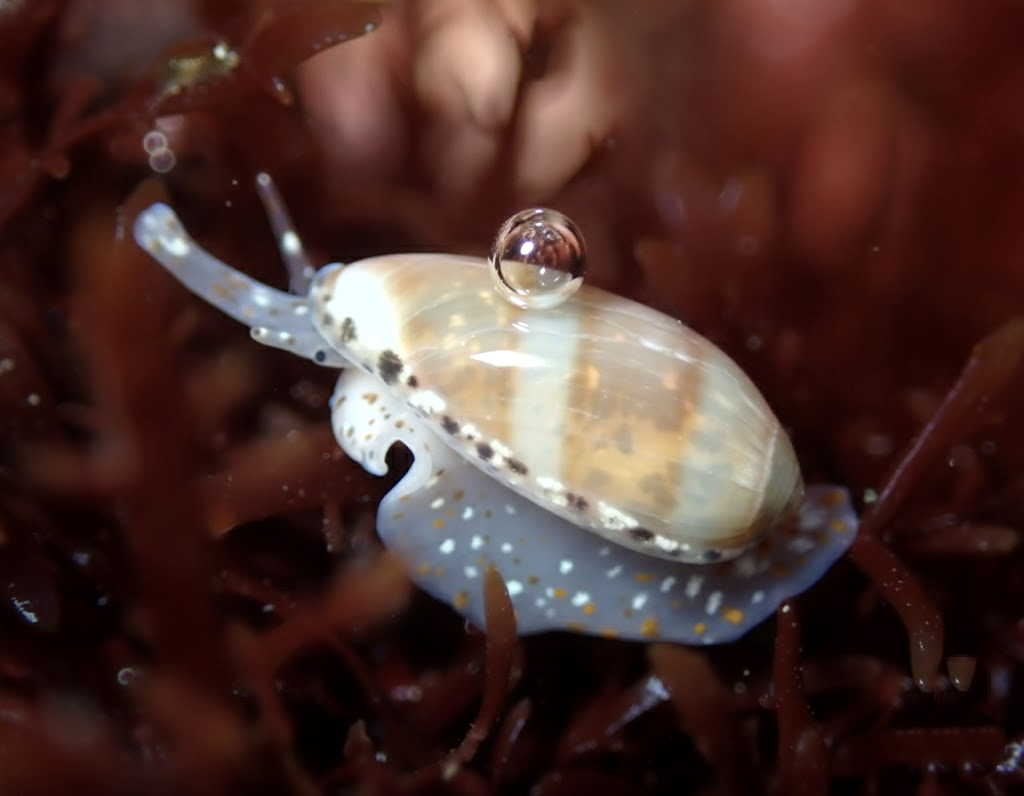
- Live specimen of Volvarina taeniolata

Scientific classification
- Kingdom: Animalia
- Phylum: Mollusca
- Class: Gastropoda
- Subclass: Caenogastropoda
- Order: Neogastropoda
- Family: Marginellidae
- Subfamily: Marginellinae
- Genus: Volvarina
- Species: V. taeniolata

Binomial name
- Volvarina taeniolata Mörch, 1860

Synonyms
- Marginella californica Tomlin, 1916; Marginella californica var. parallela Dall, 1918; Marginella rosa Schwengel, 1938; Volvarina californica (Tomlin, 1916)·; Volvarina californica parallela (Dall, 1918); Volvarina taeniolata rosa (Schwengel, 1938) ·

= Volvarina taeniolata =

Species of gastropod

Volvarina taeniolata is a species of sea snail, a marine gastropod mollusk in the family Marginellidae, the margin snails.

== Description ==
The length of the shell attains 9 mm, its diameter 4 mm.

(Described as Volvarina californica parallela) The shell resembles the Californian race of the Marginella species but is uniformly smaller. The typical form has a faint narrow spiral brown band at the suture, then a pale band, then a broad yellow-brown band, a narrower pale band, a second broad brown band beyond which the shell is pale to the anterior end - when the shell is not unicolorate. The present variety has the broad brown bands represented by narrow dark brown paired lines with a faint flush of brown between them, giving the shell a very different aspect from the type.

(Described as Marginella californica) The shell is subcylindrical, smooth, vitreous and polished. it is yellowish white, variously banded with chestnut. The spire is short and completely glazed over. The shell consists of 4½ . The apertureis narrow, dilated below. The columella is sinuous, obliquely truncate, with 4 fairly strong oblique plaits. The outer lip is thickened without. The suture is marked by a narrow white line.

== Distribution ==
This marine species occurs off California.
