= Alvania emaciata =

Scientific classification
- Kingdom: Animalia
- Phylum: Mollusca
- Class: Gastropoda
- Subclass: Caenogastropoda
- Order: Littorinimorpha
- Family: Rissoidae
- Genus: Alvania
- Species: A. emaciata

Binomial name
- Alvania emaciata (Mörch, 1876)

Synonyms
- Rissoa (Alvania) emaciata Mörch, 1876 (basionym; not a Rissoa)

Species of gastropod

Alvania emaciata is a species of small sea snail, a marine gastropod mollusk or micromollusk in the family Rissoidae.

== Description ==
The length of the shell attains 2 mm, its diameter is 1.5 mm.

(original description in Latin) The shell is white or rust-coloured. it is thick, and ovate, and has a rather short spire. The upper whorls bear two spiral ridges; the penultimate whorl has three, while the body whorl carries seven. The anterior ridges are smaller. Numerous, evenly spaced riblets cross the shell, forming nodules at their points of intersection. The outer lip is thick and crenulated.

== Distribution ==
This species occurs off the Virgin Islands, Caribbean Sea.
