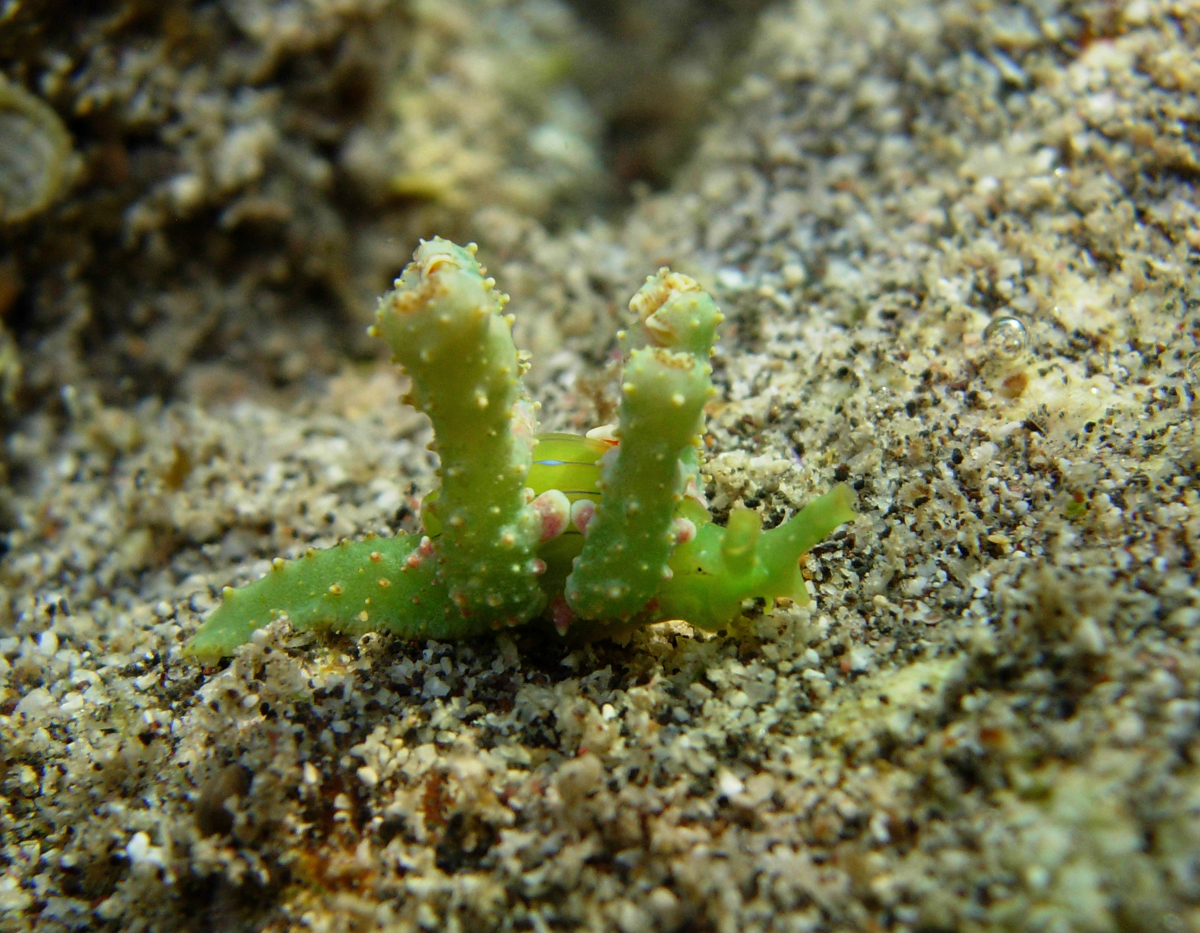

Scientific classification
- Kingdom: Animalia
- Phylum: Mollusca
- Class: Gastropoda
- Superorder: Sacoglossa
- Family: Oxynoidae
- Genus: Lobiger
- Species: L. souverbii

Binomial name
- Lobiger souverbii P. Fischer, 1856

= Lobiger souverbii =

Species of gastropod

Lobiger souverbii is a species of small sea snail or sea slug, a marine gastropod mollusk in the family Oxynoidae.

== Distribution ==
The type locality for this species is Guadeloupe.
