= Oxynoe antillarum =

Scientific classification
- Kingdom: Animalia
- Phylum: Mollusca
- Class: Gastropoda
- Superorder: Sacoglossa
- Family: Oxynoidae
- Genus: Oxynoe
- Species: O. antillarum

Binomial name
- Oxynoe antillarum Mörch, 1863

Species of gastropod

Oxynoe antillarum is a species of small sea snail or sea slug, a bubble snail, a marine gastropod mollusk in the family Oxynoidae.

== Distribution ==
The type locality for this species is Saint Thomas, U.S. Virgin Islands.

== Description ==
This species has a characteristic mottled white pattern and is covered with translucent white spots. There is a mottled white band that extends along the sides of the head, around the edge of the parapodia, and also along the edge of the foot.

The body is green and oval. The tail is very long, narrow, with a wide longitudinal white dorsal band. The body is closely dotted with green. Tentacles and sides of the head are white, with rather remote green dots arranged in series. Epipodial lobes are with acute, conic, close warts, its edge white with irregular green dots. Sole of the foot yellowish, narrow, the margin with a row of regular close green dots.

The shell is involute, ovate, hyaline-white, swollen above, very slightly contracted immediately below the vertex, shining, with some irregular wrinkles of growth. The spire is concealed. The suture a deep lunate incision. The aperture is very large, broadly ovate below, narrow above. The outer lip is sinuous, produced forward above.

The height of the shell is 6-6.25 mm. The width of the shell is 4.5 mm.

== Feeding Habits ==
O. antillarum feeds on algae, and incorporates the algae's photosynthetic pigments into its mantle. These pigments continue to carry out photosynthesis in the presence of sunlight, allowing O. antillarum to obtain additional nutrition.

== Defense ==
When irritated, O. antillarum will exude a thick white secretion, which contains chemicals unpleasant to many predators. These chemicals are thought to be derived from the algae it consumes.
