= Turbonilla subula =

Scientific classification
- Kingdom: Animalia
- Phylum: Mollusca
- Class: Gastropoda
- Family: Pyramidellidae
- Genus: Turbonilla
- Species: T. subula

Binomial name
- Turbonilla subula Mörch, 1859

Species of gastropod

Turbonilla subula is a species of sea snail, a marine gastropod mollusk in the family Pyramidellidae, the pyrams and their allies.
