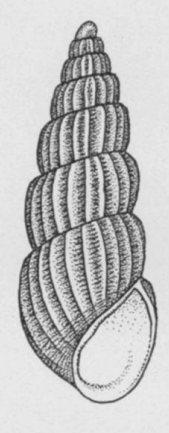
- Drawing of an apertural view of Turbonilla riisei

Scientific classification
- Kingdom: Animalia
- Phylum: Mollusca
- Class: Gastropoda
- Family: Pyramidellidae
- Genus: Turbonilla
- Species: T. riisei

Binomial name
- Turbonilla riisei (Mörch, 1875)

Synonyms
- Turbonilla pilsbryi Bush, 1899

= Turbonilla riisei =

Species of gastropod

Turbonilla riisei is a species of sea snail, a marine gastropod mollusk in the family Pyramidellidae, the pyrams and their allies.

== Distribution ==
This species occurs in the following locations:

- Caribbean Sea
- Cayman Islands
- Cuba
- Gulf of Mexico
- Lesser Antilles
