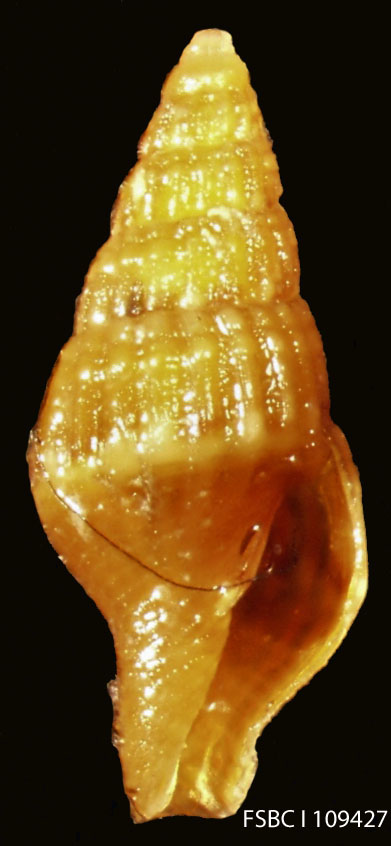
- Suturoglypta iontha shell

Scientific classification
- Kingdom: Animalia
- Phylum: Mollusca
- Class: Gastropoda
- Subclass: Caenogastropoda
- Order: Neogastropoda
- Superfamily: Buccinoidea
- Family: Columbellidae
- Genus: Suturoglypta; Radwin, 1968

Type species
- Columbella pretrii Duclos, 1846

Synonyms
- Anachis (Suturoglypta) Radwin, 1968 (original rank)

= Suturoglypta =

Genus of gastropods

Suturoglypta is a genus of sea snails, marine gastropod molluscs in the family Columbellidae, the dove snails.

== Species ==
Species within the genus Suturoglypta include:

- Suturoglypta albella (C. B. Adams, 1850)
- Suturoglypta annosa Espinosa & Ortea, 2018
- Suturoglypta blignautae Kilburn, 1998
- Suturoglypta buysi Lussi, 2009
- Suturoglypta cachoi Espinosa & Ortea, 2018
- Suturoglypta dictynna Espinosa & Ortea, 2018
- Suturoglypta dione Espinosa & Ortea, 2018
- Suturoglypta esbelta Espinosa & Ortea, 2018
- Suturoglypta evanescens Pelorce, 2017
- Suturoglypta idaniae Espinosa & Ortea, 2018
- Suturoglypta iontha (Ravenel, 1861)
- Suturoglypta iris Espinosa & Ortea, 2018
- Suturoglypta jagua Espinosa & Ortea, 2018
- Suturoglypta kevini Segers, Swinnen & De Prins, 2009
- Suturoglypta leali Espinosa & Ortea, 2018
- Suturoglypta luna Espinosa & Ortea, 2018
- Suturoglypta maisiana Espinosa & Ortea, 2018
- Suturoglypta mulata Espinosa & Ortea, 2018
- Suturoglypta occidualis Espinosa & Ortea, 2013
- Suturoglypta orboniana Espinosa & Ortea, 2018
- Suturoglypta pretrii (Duclos, 1846)
- Suturoglypta regina Espinosa & Ortea, 2018
- Suturoglypta translucida Pelorce, 2020
- Suturoglypta venusta Espinosa & Ortea, 2018

Species brought into synonymy

- Suturoglypta hotessieriana (d'Orbigny, 1842): synonym of Costoanachis hotessieriana (d'Orbigny, 1842)
- Suturoglypta procera Simone & Gracia C., 2006: synonym of Bathyglypta procera (Simone & Gracia, 2006) (original combination)
