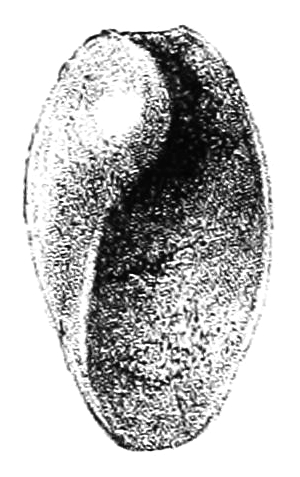
- Drawing of an apertural view of the shell of Roburnella wilsoni from its original description by Ralph Tate (1889).

Scientific classification
- Kingdom: Animalia
- Phylum: Mollusca
- Class: Gastropoda
- Superorder: Sacoglossa
- Family: Oxynoidae
- Genus: Roburnella; Ev. Marcus, 1982
- Species: R. wilsoni

Binomial name
- Roburnella wilsoni (Tate, 1889)

Synonyms
- Lobiger wilsoni Tate, 1889

= Roburnella =

Species of gastropod

Roburnella wilsoni is a species of small sea snail or bubble snail, a marine gastropod mollusc in the family Oxynoidae.

Roburnella wilsoni is the only species in the genus Roburnella.

The specific name "wilsoni" is apparently in honor of U.K./Australian malacologist John Bracebridge Wilson, who collected the type specimen.

== Distribution ==
The type locality for this species is from Port Phillip, Victoria, Australia.

== Description ==
Roburnella wilsoni was described based on collection of U.K./Australian malacologist John Bracebridge Wilson (1828–1895). It was originally described (under name Lobiger Wilsoni) by Australian biologist of British origin Ralph Tate in 1889.

The original text (the type description) reads as follows:

Animal with the body produced into a very narrow, pointed,

smooth tail of a green colour, shortly extended beyond the shell. Foot with two oblong-rounded and pale-green lobes, which are somewhat attenuated into a broadish stalk.

Shell thin, flexible, straw-yellow; spire rudimentary but involute. Somewhat pyriform, slightly attenuated in front, and truncated apically; aperture narrow-ovate, truncate behind. Surface finely striated. Length, 8 ; width, 5 millimetres.

Locality. — Lower end of South Channel of Port Phillip, seven

to sixteen fathoms (J. B. Wilson).
