= Suturoglypta albella =

Scientific classification
- Kingdom: Animalia
- Phylum: Mollusca
- Class: Gastropoda
- Subclass: Caenogastropoda
- Order: Neogastropoda
- Family: Columbellidae
- Genus: Suturoglypta
- Species: S. albella

Binomial name
- Suturoglypta albella (C. B. Adams, 1850)

Species of gastropod

Suturoglypta albella is a species of sea snail, a marine gastropod mollusc in the family Columbellidae, the dove snails.
