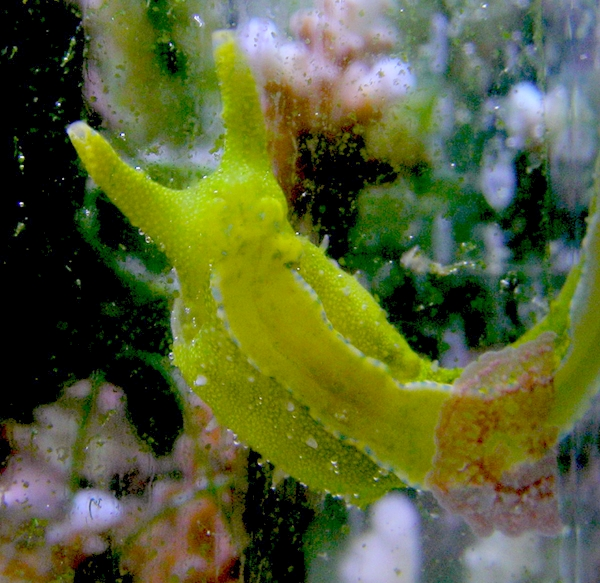
- view from bottom to Oxynoe olivacea

Scientific classification
- Kingdom: Animalia
- Phylum: Mollusca
- Class: Gastropoda
- Superorder: Sacoglossa
- Family: Oxynoidae
- Genus: Oxynoe
- Species: O. olivacea

Binomial name
- Oxynoe olivacea Rafinesque, 1814 or 1819

= Oxynoe olivacea =

Species of gastropod

Oxynoe olivacea is a species of small green bubble snail or sea slug, a marine gastropod mollusk in the family Oxynoidae.

Despite a superficial resemblance, this is not a nudibranch, it is a sacoglossan, and like other Oxynoe species, it has a small, fragile, bubble-shaped shell.

== Distribution ==
This species is found in the Mediterranean Sea. The type locality for this species is Sicily, Italy.

== Description ==
Body is elongated, swollen in front of the middle, with the tail long and narrow, pleuropodial lobes partly covering the shell, the line of their junction forming a crest or ridge the entire length of the tail. Upper side of tentacles and outer surface of pleuropodia and tail papillose. Color above clear green, the borders of the foot and pleuropodial lobes, and ends of the tentacles margined with alternating spots of pale red and blue-black. The sole is yellowish.

The shell is external, thin, fragile, pellucid and shining, convolute and globose. The shell is truncate and slightly contracted at summit, rounded and dilated at base. The last whorl is very large, completely detached from the spire by the deeply incised sutural slit. The aperture is very large, angled above, rounded below. The lip is arcuate, simple and acute. The columellar margin is with a very thin film of callus above, concave below, acute, forming an open spiral through which the interior of the whorls may be seen from the base. Color is uniform glassy white, with a thin transparent and shining, very light yellow cuticle.

The height of the shell is 12 mm. The width of the shell is 9 mm.

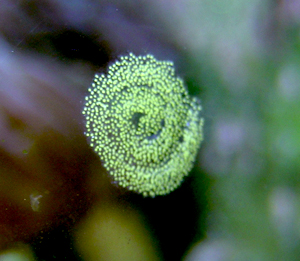
Egg mass of Oxynoe olivacea
