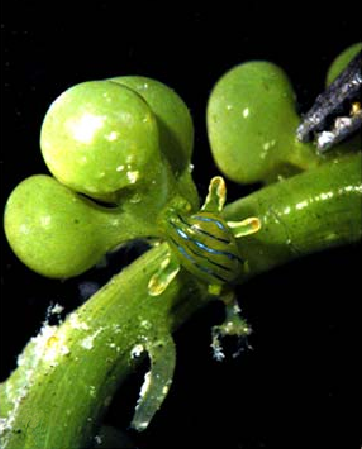
- Lobiger viridis on Caulerpa sp. Locality: Lizard Island, Great Barrier Reef. The length of the slug is about 0.5 cm.

Scientific classification
- Kingdom: Animalia
- Phylum: Mollusca
- Class: Gastropoda
- Family: Oxynoidae
- Genus: Lobiger
- Species: L. viridis

Binomial name
- Lobiger viridis Pease, 1863

Synonyms
- Lobiger nevilli Pilsbry, 1896 (nomen nudum)

= Lobiger viridis =

Species of gastropod

Lobiger viridis is a species of small sea snail, a marine gastropod mollusk in the family Oxynoidae.

This small sea snail has camouflage coloration, but when it is under attack it display bright colors to frightening off a predator.

The type locality for this species is Huahine.
