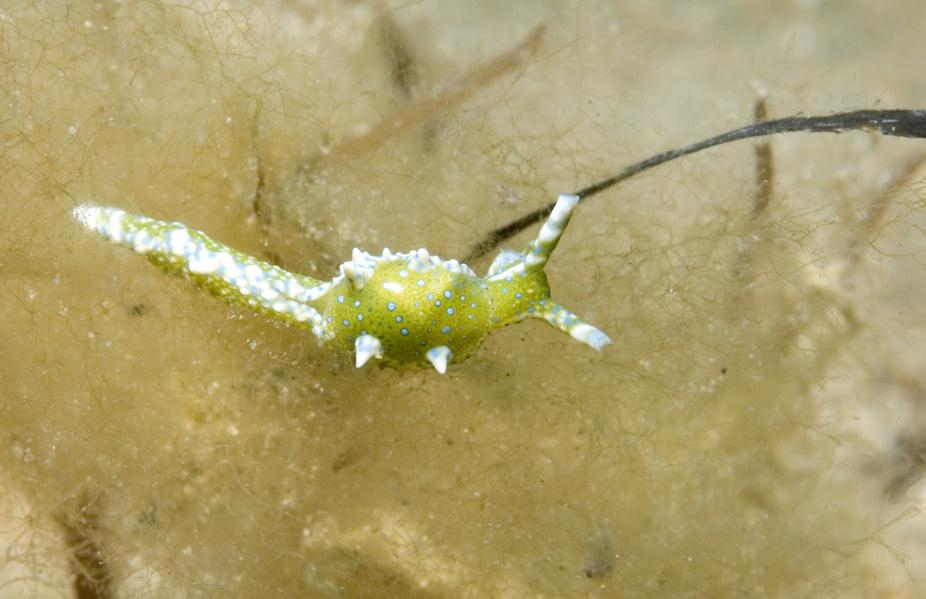

Scientific classification
- Kingdom: Animalia
- Phylum: Mollusca
- Class: Gastropoda
- Superorder: Sacoglossa
- Family: Oxynoidae
- Genus: Oxynoe
- Species: O. viridis

Binomial name
- Oxynoe viridis (Pease, 1861)

= Oxynoe viridis =

Species of gastropod

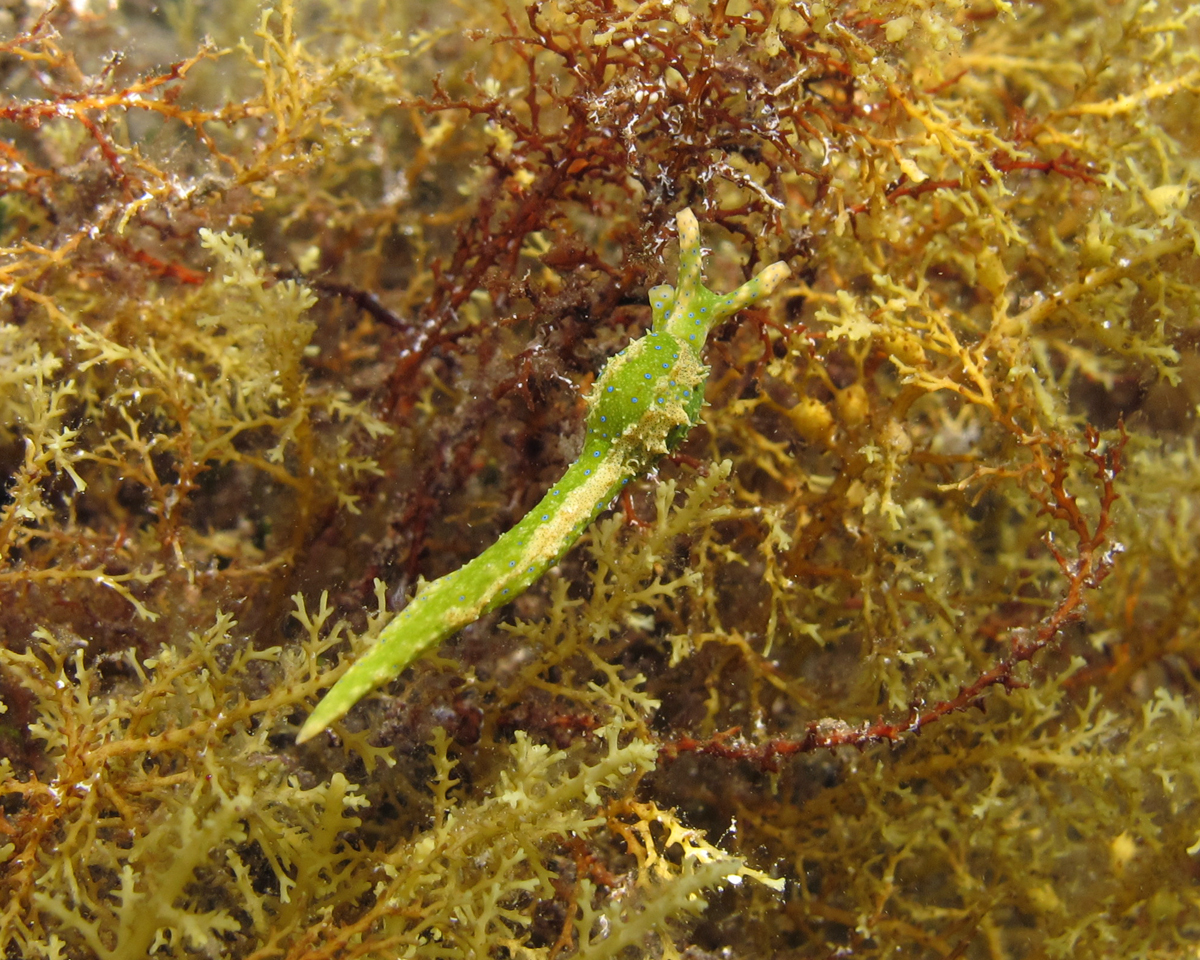

Oxynoe viridis is a species of small sea snail or sea slug, a bubble snail, a marine gastropod mollusk in the family Oxynoidae.

== Distribution ==
This species occurs in the Philippines, Australia, Indonesia, Egypt, Taiwan and Turkey.

The type locality for this species is "Sandwich Islands", now Hawaiian Islands.

== Description ==
The body is oval or ovate, dorsal region elevated, lateral lobes regular in shape, outline of the edges convex, not meeting; tentacles well-developed, grooved and truncated; eyes immersed immediately behind the tentacles; foot linear, adapted for clasping seaweed; the whole upper surface garnished with more or less numerous cirrigerous appendages. Tail is long, compressed and lance-pointed. Color: grass green, mottled with darker, sometimes dotted minutely with brown, or a few blue spots margined with black along the edge of the lateral lobes and on the neck.

The shell is thin, pellucid, fragile, white, slightly convolute, obliquely finely striate, left side slightly inflated. The aperture is large, open widely. The outer lip is disjoined from the apex, very slightly produced posteriorly and truncate. The inner lip is slightly callous.
