= Suturoglypta buysi =

Scientific classification
- Kingdom: Animalia
- Phylum: Mollusca
- Class: Gastropoda
- Subclass: Caenogastropoda
- Order: Neogastropoda
- Family: Columbellidae
- Genus: Suturoglypta
- Species: S. buysi

Binomial name
- Suturoglypta buysi Lussi, 2009

Species of gastropod

Suturoglypta buysi is a species of sea snail, a marine gastropod mollusc in the family Columbellidae, the dove snails. The species is endemic to an area off the southeast coast of South Africa.
