= Suturoglypta kevini =

Scientific classification
- Kingdom: Animalia
- Phylum: Mollusca
- Class: Gastropoda
- Subclass: Caenogastropoda
- Order: Neogastropoda
- Family: Columbellidae
- Genus: Suturoglypta
- Species: S. kevini

Binomial name
- Suturoglypta kevini Segers, Swinnen & De Prins, 2009

Species of gastropod

Suturoglypta kevini is a species of sea snail, a marine gastropod mollusc in the family Columbellidae, the dove snails.
