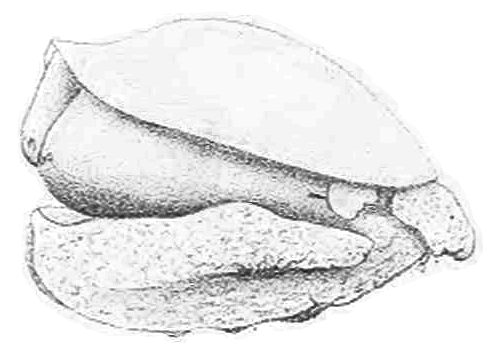
- Drawing of right side of preserved specimen of Lophopleurella capensis from original description by Johannes Thiele (1912).
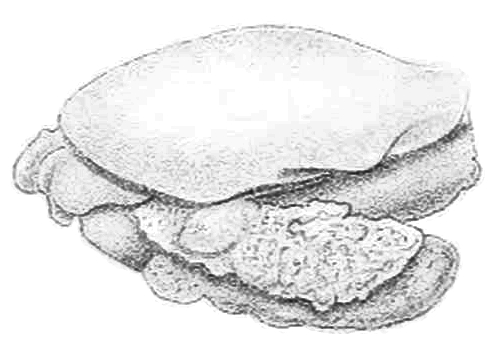
- Drawing of left side of the same specimen.

Scientific classification
- Kingdom: Animalia
- Phylum: Mollusca
- Class: Gastropoda
- Superorder: Sacoglossa
- Family: Oxynoidae
- Genus: Lophopleurella; Zilch, 1956
- Species: L. capensis

Binomial name
- Lophopleurella capensis (Thiele, 1912)

Synonyms
- Lobiger (Lophopleura) capensis Thiele, 1912; Lobiger capensis Thiele, 1912

= Lophopleurella =

Species of gastropod

Lophopleurella capensis is a species of sea snail, a marine gastropod mollusc in the family Oxynoidae.

Lophopleurella capensis is the only species in the genus Lophopleurella.

The specific name "capensis" is from the Latin language, meaning "of the Cape", i.e. from the Cape Province".

== Distribution ==
The type locality for this species is South Africa.

== Description ==
This species was originally described under name Lobiger (Lophopleura) capensis by German malacologist Johannes Thiele in 1912 as a result of the Gauss Expedition (1901–1903), that was the first German expedition to Antarctica.

Johannes Thiele described it very briefly stating, that it "has wing-shaped attachments on sides of the body and very small wing on its shell".

German malacologist Adolf Michael Zilch established a new genus Lophopleurella Zilch, 1956 for this species, because the name Lophopleura Ragonot, 1891 had already been occupied and used for a genus of lepidopterans from family Pyralidae. Zilch only created the new generic name without a review of the genus.

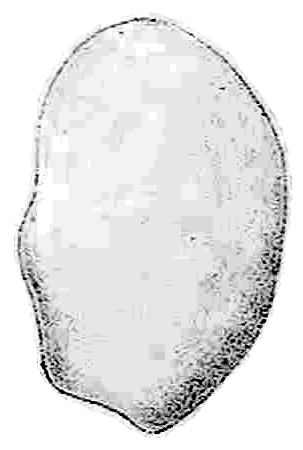
Drawing of dorsal view of the shell.

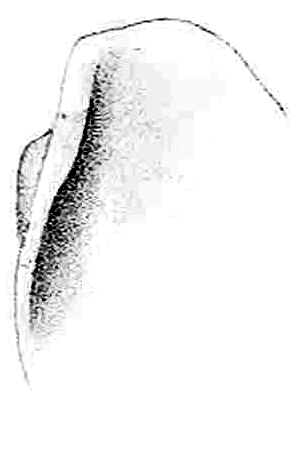
Drawing of ventral view of the shell.
