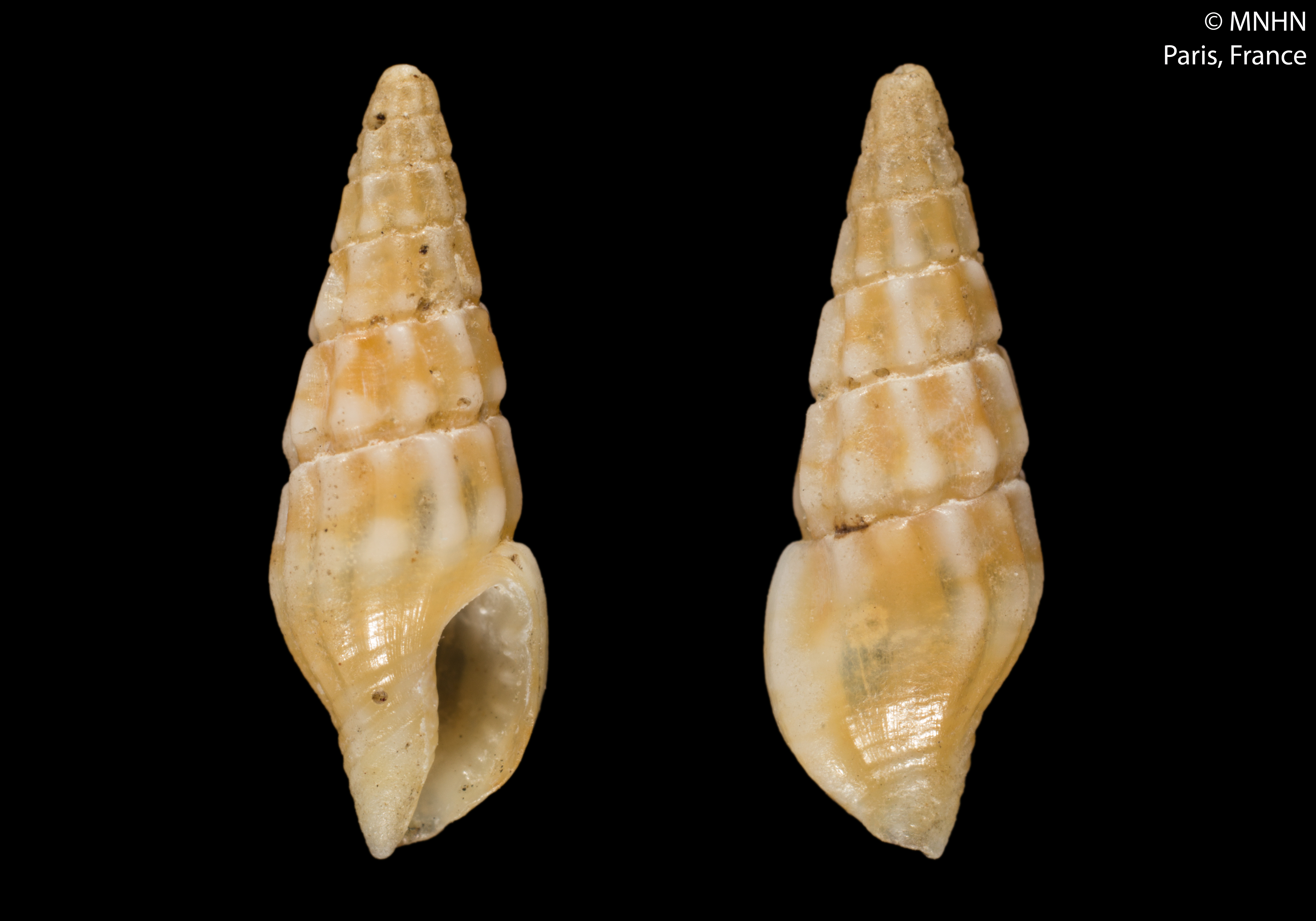
- Shell of Suturoglypta pretrii (syntype at MNHN, Paris)

Scientific classification
- Kingdom: Animalia
- Phylum: Mollusca
- Class: Gastropoda
- Subclass: Caenogastropoda
- Order: Neogastropoda
- Family: Columbellidae
- Genus: Suturoglypta
- Species: S. pretrii

Binomial name
- Suturoglypta pretrii (Duclos, 1846)

Synonyms
- Anachis mangelioides (Reeve, 1859); Anachis pretrii (Duclos, 1846); Anachis samanensis Dall, 1889; Colombella pretrii Duclos, 1846; Columbella mangelioides Reeve, 1859

= Suturoglypta pretrii =

Species of gastropod

Suturoglypta pretrii is a species of very small sea snail, a marine gastropod mollusc in the family Columbellidae, the dove snails.

== Description ==
The length of the shell is between 7.5 and 8.5 mm. It has a biconic shape and the spire makes up about half the total shell length. The spire can be between 30° to 35°.
