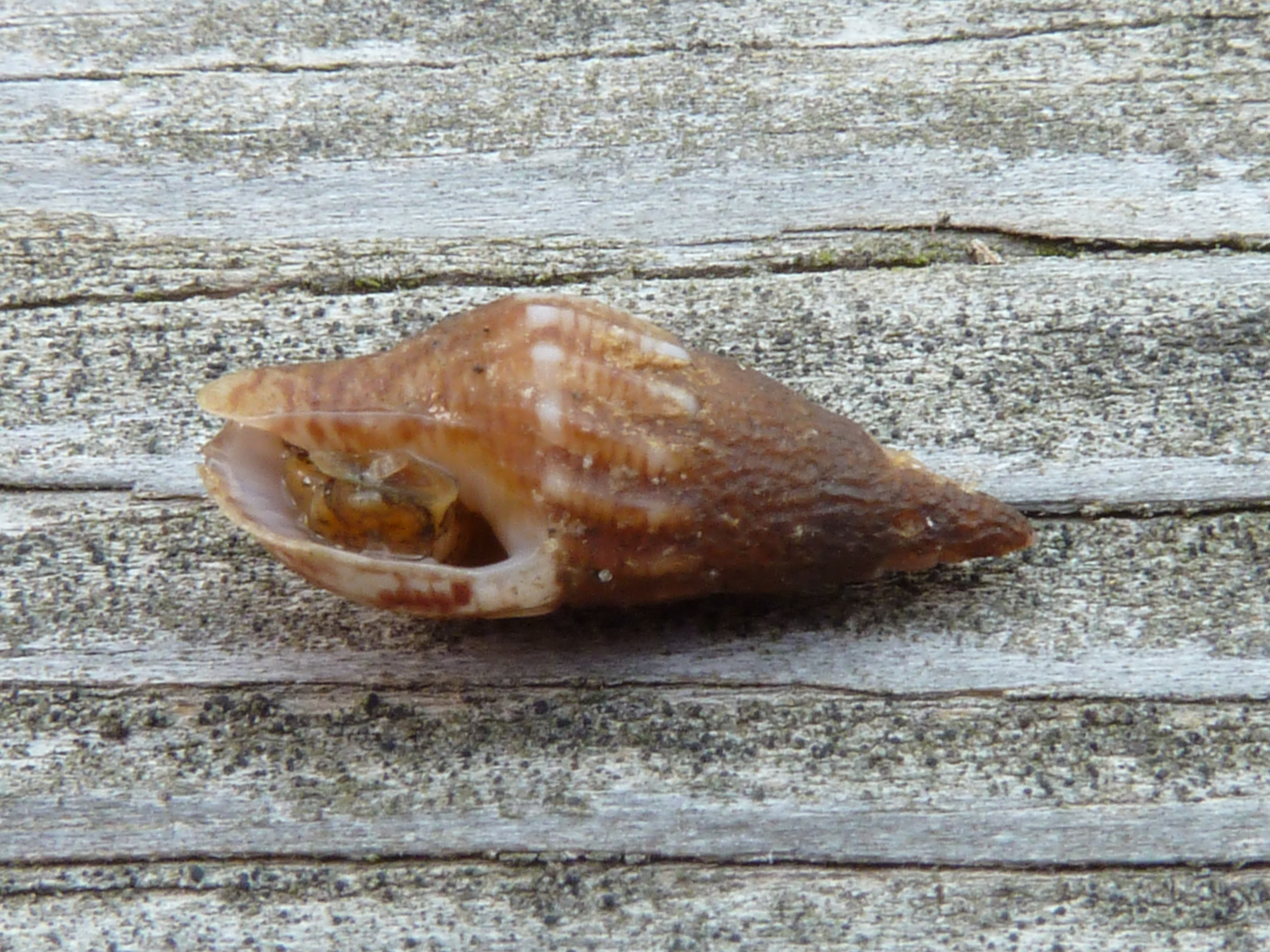
- Cotonopsis lafresnayi

Scientific classification
- Kingdom: Animalia
- Phylum: Mollusca
- Class: Gastropoda
- Subclass: Caenogastropoda
- Order: Neogastropoda
- Superfamily: Buccinoidea
- Family: Columbellidae
- Genus: Cotonopsis; Olsson, 1942

Type species
- Strombina panacostaricensis Olsson, A.A., 1942

Synonyms
- Cotonopsis (Cotonopsis) Olsson, 1942· accepted, alternate representation; Cotonopsis (Turrina) P. Jung, 1989· accepted, alternate representation

= Cotonopsis =

Genus of gastropods

Cotonopsis is a genus of sea snails, marine gastropod molluscs in the family Columbellidae, the dove snails.

== Species ==
Species within the genus Cotonopsis include:

- Cotonopsis argentea (Houbrick, 1983)
- Cotonopsis crassiparva Jung, 1989
- Cotonopsis deroyae (Emerson & d'Attilio, 1969)
- Cotonopsis filbyi (G. B. Sowerby III, 1888)
- Cotonopsis hirundo (Gaskoin, 1851)
- Cotonopsis jaliscana Jung, 1989
- Cotonopsis lafresnayi (P. Fischer & Bernardi, 1857)
- Cotonopsis lindae (Petuch, 1989)
- Cotonopsis mendozana (Shasky, 1970)
- Cotonopsis monfilsi (Emerson, 1993)
- Cotonopsis panacostaricensis (Olsson, 1942)
- Cotonopsis phuketensis (Kosuge, Roussy & Muangman, 1998)
- Cotonopsis pointieri Pelorce, 2020
- Cotonopsis radwini Jung, 1989
- Cotonopsis saintpairiana (Caillet, 1864)
- Cotonopsis semistriata Pelorce, 2020
- Cotonopsis serratisutura Pelorce, 2020
- Cotonopsis skoglundae Jung, 1989
- Cotonopsis suteri Jung, 1989
- Cotonopsis turrita (G.B. Sowerby I, 1832)

Species brought into synonymy

- Cotonopsis allaryi Bozzetti, 2010: synonym of Cotonopsis saintpairiana (Caillet, 1864)
- Cotonopsis edentula (Dall, 1908): synonym of Cotonopsis filbyi (G. B. Sowerby III, 1888)
- Cotonopsis vanwalleghemi Kronenberg & Dekker, 1998: synonym of Cotonopsis phuketensis (Kosuge, Roussy & Muangman, 1998)
