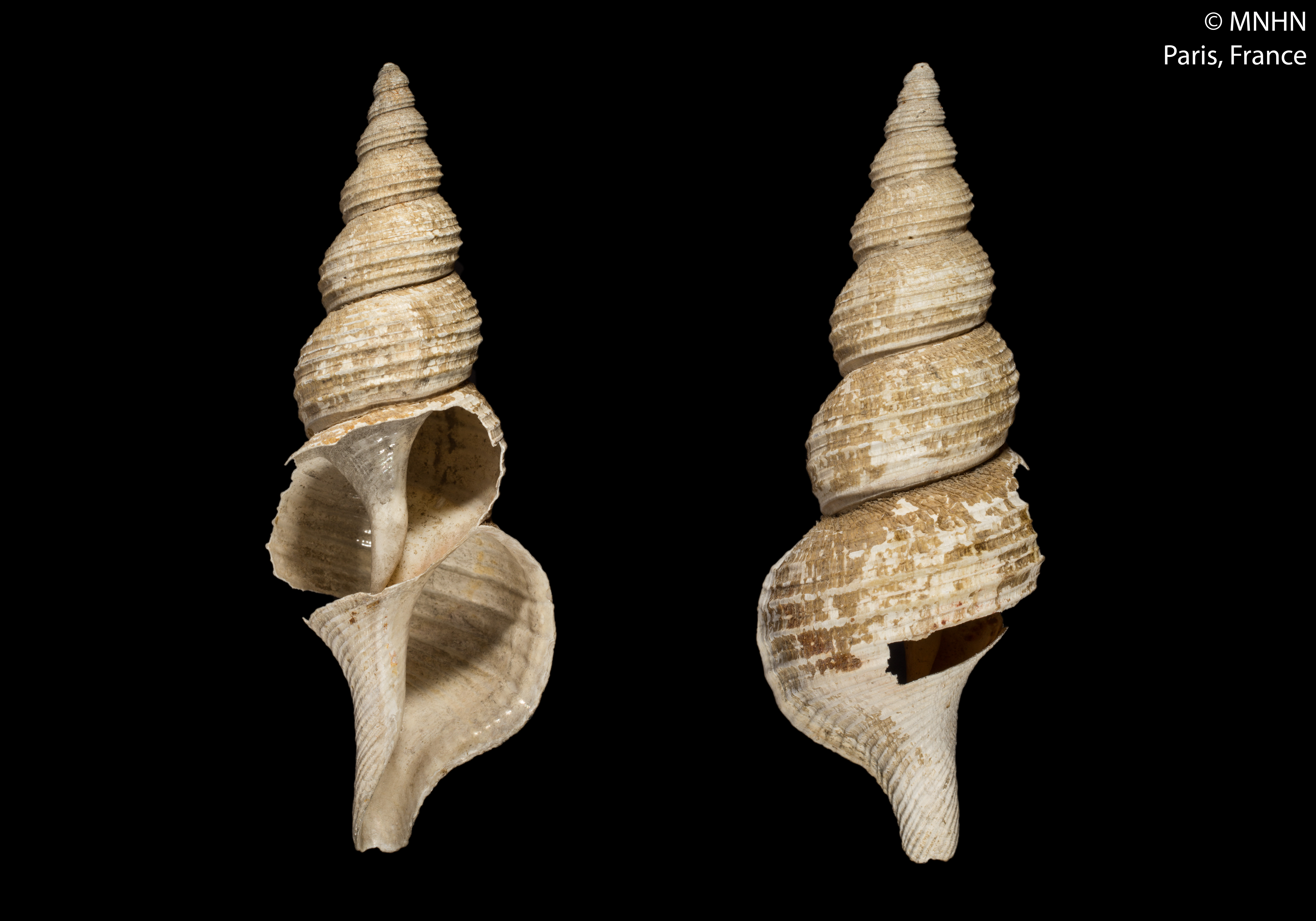
- Shell of Troschelia berniciensis (specimen at MNHN, Paris)

Scientific classification
- Kingdom: Animalia
- Phylum: Mollusca
- Class: Gastropoda
- Subclass: Caenogastropoda
- Order: Neogastropoda
- Family: Buccinidae
- Genus: Troschelia
- Species: T. berniciensis

Binomial name
- Troschelia berniciensis (King, 1846)

Synonyms
- Boreofusus berniciensis (W. King, 1846); Buccinofusus berniciensis (W. King, 1846); Boreofusus berniciensis var. solida G. O. Sars, 1878; Fusus amblyterus R. B. Watson, 1886; Fusus berniciensis W. King, 1846; Fusus berniciensis var. elegans Jeffreys, 1867; Fusus berniciensis var. inflata Jeffreys, 1877; Neptunea aquitanica Locard, 1897; Neptunea berniciensis (W. King, 1846); Neptunea berniciensis var. carinata Locard, 1897; Neptunia aquitanica Locard, 1897; Neptunia berniciensis (W. King, 1846); Neptunia berniciensis var. carinata Locard, 1897; Neptunia berniciensis var. elongata Locard, 1897; Neptunia berniciensis var. major Locard, 1897; Neptunia berniciensis var. minor Locard, 1897; Neptunia berniciensis var. ventricosa Locard, 1897; Siphonorbis amblyterus (W. King, 1846)

= Troschelia berniciensis =

Species of gastropod

Troschelia berniciensis is a species of sea snail, a marine gastropod mollusk in the family Buccinidae, the true whelks.

== Description ==
The length of the shell attains 100.2 mm.

(Described as Buccinofusus berniciensis) The whorls are encircled with alternately larger and smaller revolving ridges, decussated by fine growth-lines. The margin of the outer lip is slightly everted. The shell is thin, white and covered with a very thin, light olive epidermis.

The shape of the shell is variable in height and in height-to-breadth ratios, depending on the depth of occurrence and the latitude.

== Distribution ==
This species occurs in the northeastern Atlantic Ocean in deep water between 400 and 1600 m from the Morocco coast to Norway.
