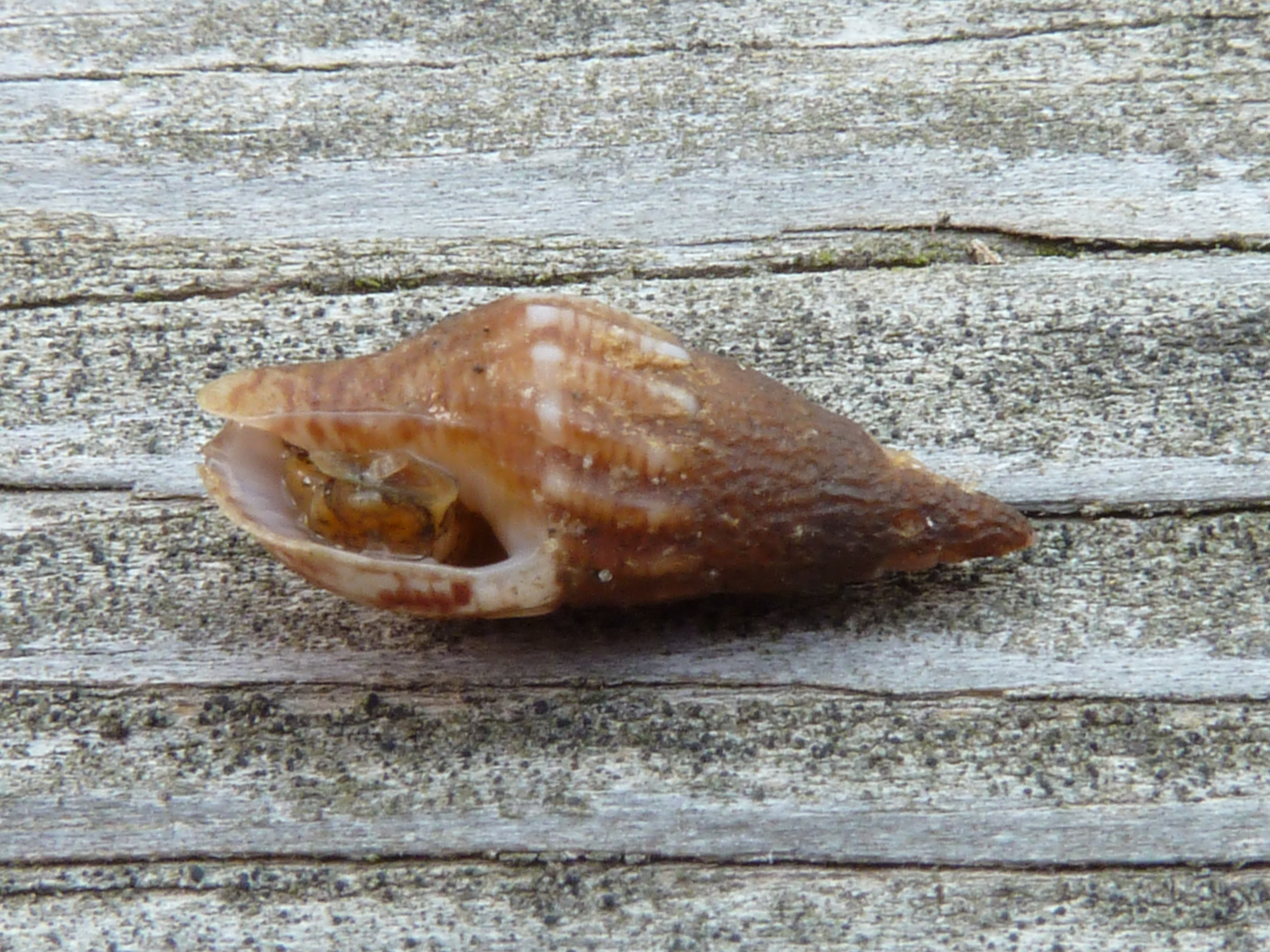
- Apertural view of a shell of Cotonopsis lafresnayi

Scientific classification
- Kingdom: Animalia
- Phylum: Mollusca
- Class: Gastropoda
- Subclass: Caenogastropoda
- Order: Neogastropoda
- Family: Columbellidae
- Genus: Cotonopsis
- Species: C. lafresnayi

Binomial name
- Cotonopsis lafresnayi (P. Fischer & Bernardi, 1857)

Synonyms
- Anachis lafresnayi (P. Fischer & Bernardi, 1857); Columbella lafresnayi Fischer & Bernardi, 1857 (basionym); Columbella saint-pairiana Caillet, 1864; Costoanachis lafresnayi (P. Fischer & Bernardi, 1857)

= Cotonopsis lafresnayi =

Species of gastropod

Cotonopsis lafresnayi, common name the well-ribbed dovesnail, is a species of sea snail, a marine gastropod mollusk in the family Columbellidae, the dove snails.

== Description ==
The size of the adult shell varies between 10 mm and 19 mm.

== Distribution ==
This species is distributed in the North West Atlantic, the Gulf of Maine, the Caribbean Sea and the Lesser Antilles.
