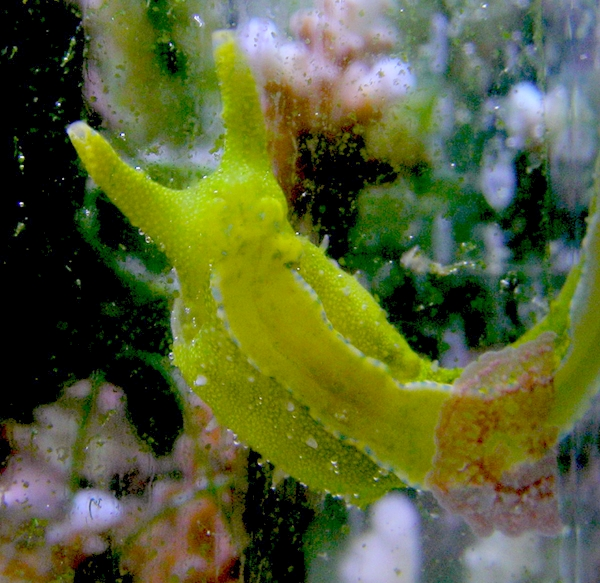
- A view through glass of the underside of an individual of Oxynoe olivacea

Scientific classification
- Kingdom: Animalia
- Phylum: Mollusca
- Class: Gastropoda
- Family: Oxynoidae
- Genus: Oxynoe; Rafinesque, 1814

Type species
- Oxynoe olivacea Rafinesque, 1814

Synonyms
- Lophocercus Krohn, 1847

= Oxynoe =

Genus of gastropods

Oxynoe is a genus of small sea snails, bubble snails, marine gastropod mollusks in the family Oxynoidae.

== Species ==
The World Register of Marine Species accepts the following species within the genus Oxynoe:

- Oxynoe aliciae Krug, Berriman & Á. Valdés, 2018
- Oxynoe antillarum Mörch, 1863
- Oxynoe azuropunctata K. R. Jensen, 1980
- Oxynoe benchijigua Ortea, Moro & Espinosa, 1999
- Oxynoe ilani Krug, Berriman & Á. Valdés, 2018
- Oxynoe jacksoni Krug, Berriman & Á. Valdés, 2018
- Oxynoe jordani Krug, Berriman & Á. Valdés, 2018
- Oxynoe kabirensis Hamatani, 1980
- Oxynoe kylei Krug, Berriman & Á. Valdés, 2018
- Oxynoe natalensis E. A. Smith, 1903
- Oxynoe neridae Krug, Berriman & Á. Valdés, 2018
- Oxynoe olivacea Rafinesque, 1814
- Oxynoe pakiki Ortea & Moro, 2020
- Oxynoe struthioe Krug, Berriman & Á. Valdés, 2018
- Oxynoe viridis (Pease, 1861)

Invalid species named Oxynoe include:

- Oxynoe aguayoi Jaume, 1945
- Oxynoe brachycephalus Mörch, 1863
- Oxynoe delicatula Nevill & Nevill, 1869 : synonym of Oxynoe viridis (Pease, 1861)
- Oxynoe glabra Couthouy, 1838 : synonym of Marsenina glabra (Couthouy, 1838)
- Oxynoe hargravesi Adams, 1872
- Oxynoe natalensis Smith, 1903
- Oxynoe panamensis Pilsbry & Olsson, 1943 : nomen dubium
