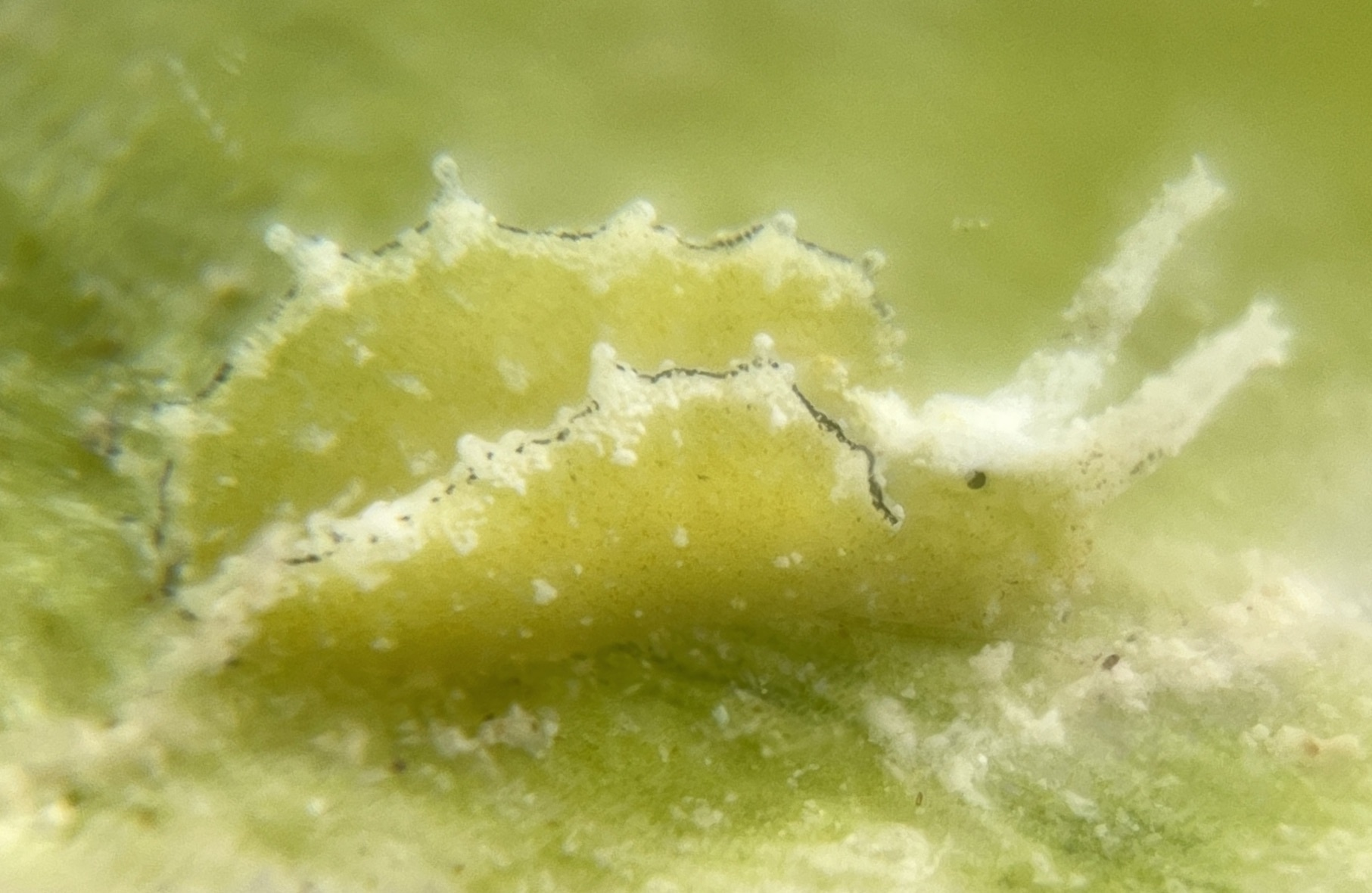

Scientific classification
- Kingdom: Animalia
- Phylum: Mollusca
- Class: Gastropoda
- Superorder: Sacoglossa
- Family: Plakobranchidae
- Genus: Elysia
- Species: E. subornata

Binomial name
- Elysia subornata (Verrill, 1901)

= Elysia subornata =

Species of gastropod

Elysia subornata is a species of small sea slug, a marine opisthobranch gastropod mollusk in the family Plakobranchidae.

This sea slug resembles a nudibranch, but it is not closely related to that order of gastropods. Instead, it is a sacoglossan.

== Description ==
Elysia subornata grows to a length of about 5 centimetres (2.0 in). It is variable in colour, being found in shades of green, olive and beige, sometimes with a reddish tinge. It has broad parapodia (fleshy protrusions at the side) with thick white margins sometimes edged in brown or black. The parapodia are covered in tiny papillae (fleshy protuberances) and the rhinophores (sensory organs on the head) are also papillose.

== Distribution ==
This species is found in the tropical western Atlantic Ocean, including the Caribbean Sea.

== Human uses ==
It has been proposed that Elysia subornata could be used as a biological control agent against an invasive strain of the alga Caulerpa taxifolia in the northwestern Mediterranean Sea. The high toxicity levels of that alga discourage most of the native herbivorous fauna from consuming it. Elysia subornata, however, preferentially feeds on Caulerpa taxifolia, using the secondary metabolite, Caulerpenyne, for its own defence. It doesn't survive the cool temperature of winter Mediterranean waters, and would therefore need to be raised on a large scale to have any significant effect. Either that; or a hybrid would have to be genetically engineered using DNA from E. timida and/or E. viridis.
