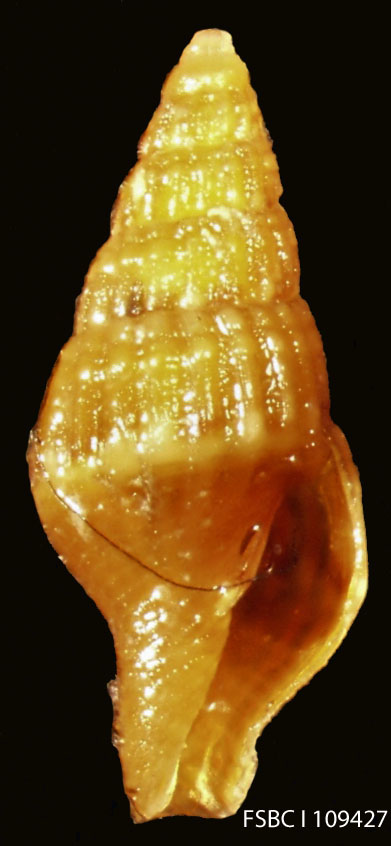
- Suturoglypta iontha shell

Scientific classification
- Kingdom: Animalia
- Phylum: Mollusca
- Class: Gastropoda
- Subclass: Caenogastropoda
- Order: Neogastropoda
- Family: Columbellidae
- Genus: Suturoglypta
- Species: S. iontha

Binomial name
- Suturoglypta iontha (Ravenel, 1861)

Synonyms
- Anachis acuta Stearns, 1873; Anachis iontha (Ravenel, 1861); Columbella iontha Ravenel, 1861; Columbella ocellata Reeve, 1859

= Suturoglypta iontha =

Species of gastropod

Suturoglypta iontha is a species of sea snail, a marine gastropod mollusc in the family Columbellidae, the dove snails.
