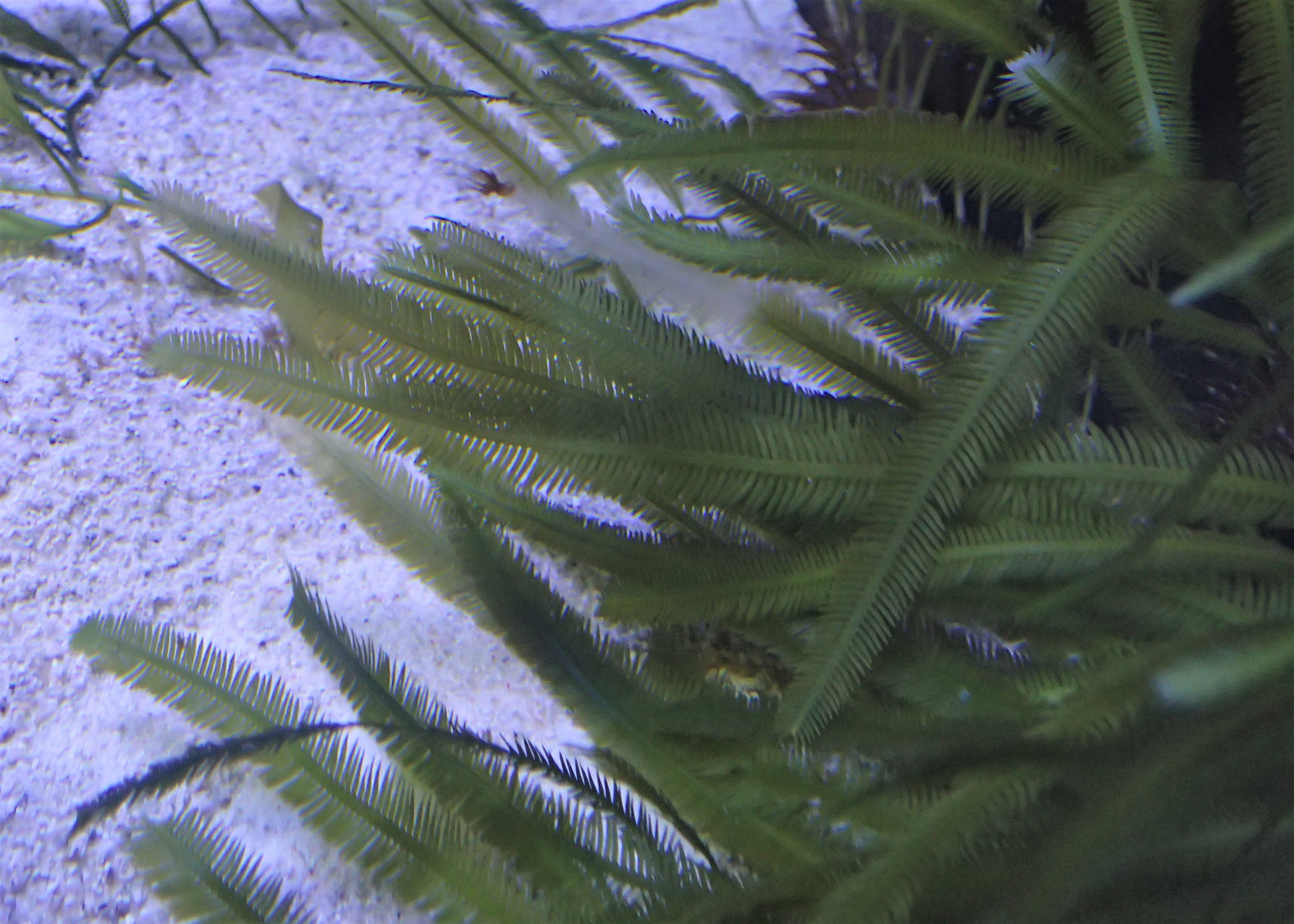

Scientific classification
- Domain: Eukaryota
- Supergroup: Archaeplastida
- Clade: Viridiplantae
- Division: Chlorophyta
- Class: Ulvophyceae
- Order: Bryopsidales
- Family: Caulerpaceae
- Genus: Caulerpa
- Species: C. taxifolia

Binomial name
- Caulerpa taxifolia (M.Vahl) C.Agardh, 1817

= Caulerpa taxifolia =

Species of alga

Caulerpa taxifolia is a species of green seaweed, an alga of the genus Caulerpa, native to tropical waters of the Pacific Ocean, Indian Ocean, and Caribbean Sea. The species name taxifolia arises from the resemblance of its leaf-like fronds to those of the yew (Taxus).

A strain of the species bred for use in aquariums has established non-native populations in waters of the Mediterranean Sea, the United States, and Australia. It is one of two species of algae listed in 100 of the World's Worst Invasive Alien Species compiled by the IUCN Invasive Species Specialist Group.

== Description ==
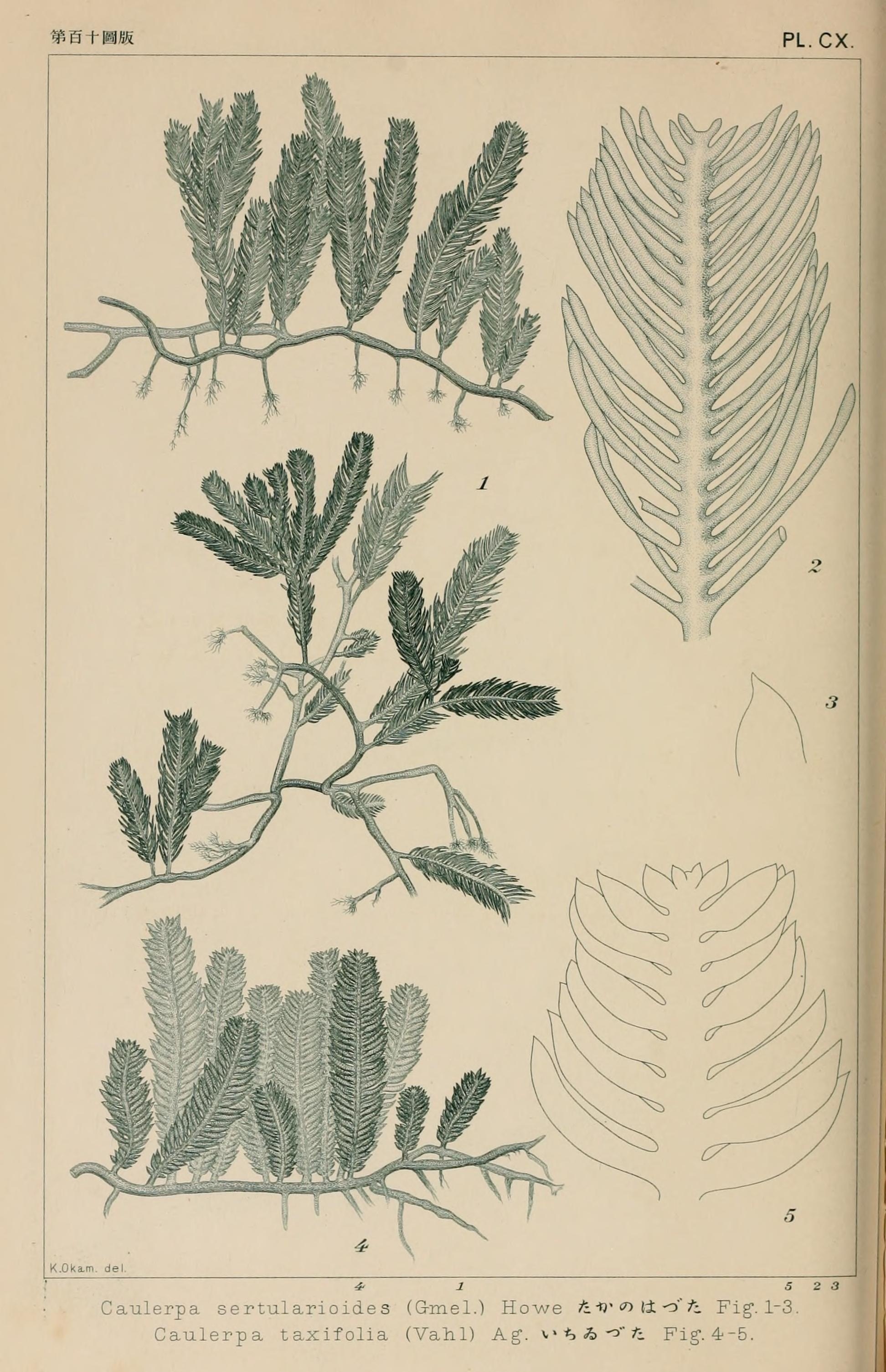
Two illustrations (Fig 1 . 4-5) of C. taxifolia displaying its "leaf" and rhizome structures (Fig 1 . 1-3 are illustrations of C. sertularioides)

C. taxifolia is light green with stolons (stems) on the sea floor, from which sparsely-branched upright fronds of approximately 20–60 cm (8–24 in) in height arise. Algae in the genus Caulerpa synthesize a mixture of toxins termed caulerpicin, believed to impart a peppery taste to the plants. The effects of the specific toxin synthesized by C. taxifolia, caulerpenyne, have been studied, with extracts from C. taxifolia being found to negatively affect P-glycoprotein-ATPase in the sea sponge G. cydonium.

Like all members of the genus Caulerpa, C. taxifolia consists of a single cell with many nuclei. The algae has been identified as the largest known single-celled organism. Wild-type C. taxifolia is monoecious.

== Use in aquaria ==
Caulerpa species are commonly used in aquaria for their aesthetic qualities and ability to control the growth of undesired species. C. taxifolia has been cultivated for use in aquaria in western Europe since the early 1970s. A clone of the alga that was resistant to cold was observed in the tropical aquarium at the Wilhelma Zoo in Stuttgart and further bred by exposure to chemicals and ultraviolet light. The zoo distributed the strain to other aquaria, including the Oceanographic Museum of Monaco.

The aquarium strain is morphologically identical to native populations of the species. However, a 2008 study found that a population of the aquarium strain near Caloundra, Australia exhibited markedly reduced sexual reproduction, with only male plants present during some reproductive episodes. The aquarium strain can survive out of water for up to 10 days in moist conditions, with 1 cm fragments capable of producing viable plants.

== Status as invasive species ==
Outside its native range, C. taxifolia is listed as an invasive species. It is one of two algae on the list of the world's 100 worst invasive species compiled by the IUCN Invasive Species Specialist Group (alongside Wakame). The species is able to thrive in heavily polluted waters, possibly contributing to its spread in the Mediterranean.

=== Presence in the Mediterranean Sea ===
The presence of C. taxifolia in the Mediterranean was first reported in 1984 in an area adjacent to the Oceanographic Museum of Monaco. Alexandre Meinesz, a marine biologist, attempted to alert Moroccan and French authorities to the spread of the strain in 1989, but the governments failed to respond to his concerns. The occurrence of the strain is generally believed to be due to an accidental release by the museum, but Monaco rejected the attribution and instead claimed that the observed algae was a mutant strain of C. mexicana. By 1999, scientists agreed that it was no longer possible to eliminate the presence of C. taxifolia in the Mediterranean.

A study published in 2002 found that beds of Posidonia oceanica in the Bay of Menton were not negatively affected eight years after colonization by C. taxifolia. Other published studies have shown that fish diversity and biomass are equal or greater in Caulerpa meadows than in seagrass beds and that Caulerpa had no effect on composition or richness of fish species.

Studies in 1998 and 2001 found that the strain observed in the Mediterranean was genetically identical to aquarium strains, with similarities to an additional population in Australia.

=== Presence in Australia ===
A 2007 study found that a native bivalve mollusc species was negatively affected by the presence of C. taxifolia, but that the effect was not necessarily different from that of native seagrass species. A 2010 study indicated that the effect of detritus from C. taxifolia negatively impacted abundance and species richness.

=== Presence in California ===
C. taxifolia was found in waters near San Diego, California, in 2000, where chlorine bleach was used in efforts to eradicate the strain. The strain was declared eradicated from Agua Hedionda Lagoon in 2006. California passed a law in 2001 forbidding the possession, sale, transport, or release of Caulerpa taxifolia within the state. The Mediterranean clone of C. taxifolia was listed as a noxious weed in 1999 by the Animal and Plant Health Inspection Service, prohibiting interstate sale and transport of the strain without a permit under the Noxious Weed Act and Plant Protection Act.

=== Other negative effects ===
C. taxifolia may become entangled in fishing gear and boat propellers.

=== Control methods ===
C. taxifolia may be controlled via mechanical removal, poisoning with chlorine, or application of salt. Researchers at the University of Nice investigated possible use of a species of sea slug, Elysia subornata, as a possible natural control method, but found that it was not suitable for use in the Mediterranean due to cold winter water temperatures and insufficient population density.

== Gallery ==
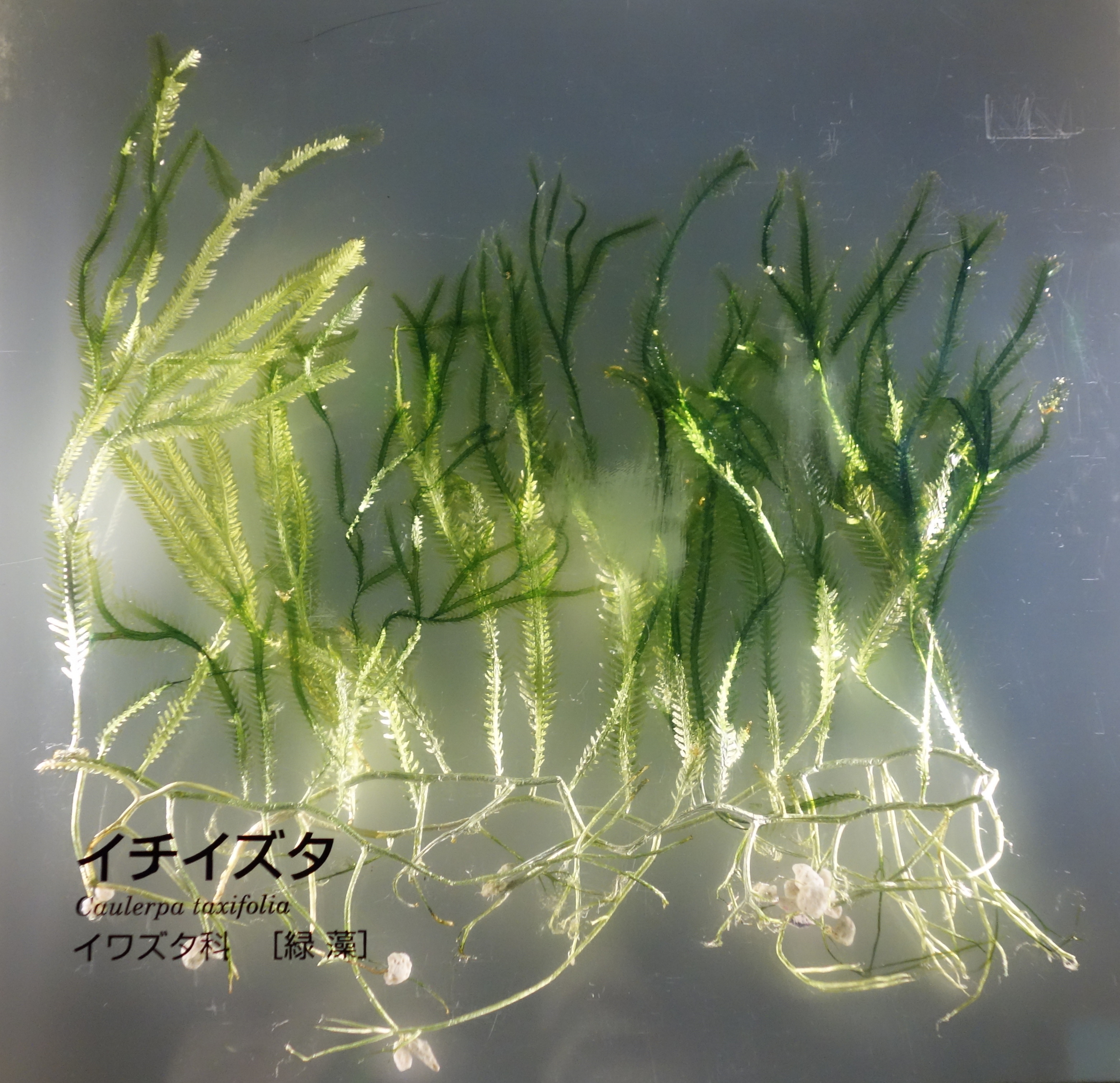
C. taxifolia on display at the National Museum of Nature and Science in Tokyo, Japan

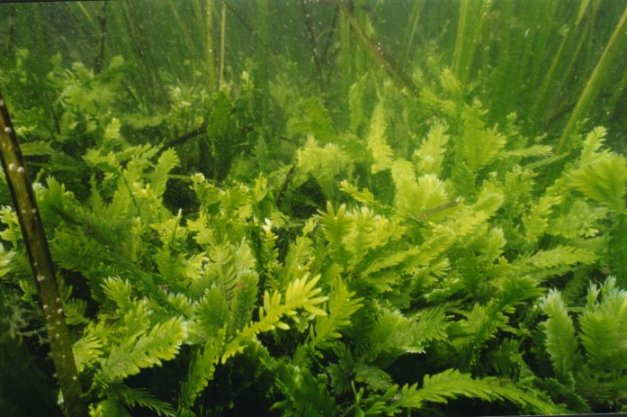
A field of C. taxifolia amongst seagrass

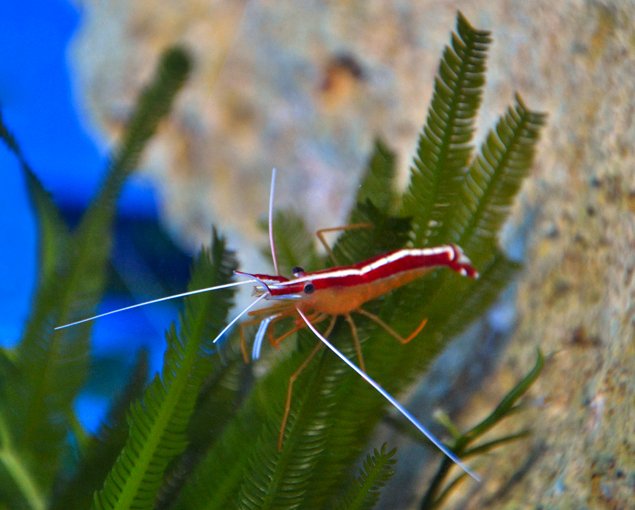
A Pacific cleaner shrimp (Lysmata amboinensis) on top of a C. taxifolia specimen within a marine aquarium

== See also ==
- Largest organisms
