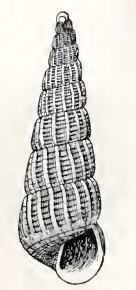
- Drawing of the shell of Turbonilla mörchi

Scientific classification
- Kingdom: Animalia
- Phylum: Mollusca
- Class: Gastropoda
- Family: Pyramidellidae
- Genus: Turbonilla
- Species: T. mörchi

Binomial name
- Turbonilla mörchi Dall & Bartsch, 1907

Synonyms
- Turbonilla (Pyrgiscus) mörchi Dall & Bartsch, 1907

= Turbonilla mörchi =

Species of gastropod

Turbonilla mörchi is a species of small sea snail, a marine gastropod mollusk in the family Pyramidellidae, the pyrams and their allies.

== Description ==
The shell has a broadly elongate-conic shape. The shell reaches a length of 6.4 mm. The posterior third of the exposed portion of the whorls on the spire and a narrow area about the umbilical region are flesh-colored, while the rest of the shell is light chestnut brown. The 2½ whorls of the protoconch are small and smooth. They form a depressed helicoid spire which has its axis at right angles to the axis of the succeeding turns and is about one-fifth immersed in the first of them. The exposed portion of the nine whorls of the teleoconch are flattened in the middle, the posterior fourth sloping gently toward the summit, which is closely appressed to the preceding turn. The anterior portion slopes more abruptly, roundly toward the periphery. The whorls are ornamented by strong rather distantly spaced, moderately acute, slightly protractive axial ribs, of which 18 occur upon the first three, 16 on the next three, 18 on the seventh, and 20 upon the penultimate turn. The ribs weaken slightly and become somewhat flattened as they approach the constricted sutures. The intercostal spacesare broad, reaching almost double the width of the ribs. They are crossed by 7, equal and equally spaced, deeply incised spiral lines, which extend up on the sides of the ribs and feebly across them. The space between the second and third lines appears slightly nodulose on the ribs. The periphery of the body whorl is angulated. It is crossed by the continuations of the ribs, which disappear as they pass on to the short and well-rounded base. The base of the shell is marked by 13 continuous incised spiral lines of about equal strength which are much more closely spaced near the umbilicus than the periphery. The distance between the succeeding striations diminish in regular ratio from the periphery to the umbilical area. The first two below the periphery are considerably more distantly spaced than the rest, the spaces inclosed between them being about equal to the space inclosed between the spiral lines on the spire. The aperture is subquadrate. The posterior angle is acute. The outer lip is thin, showing the external sculpture within. The columella is slender, oblique, somewhat twisted and slightly revolute.

== Distribution ==
This species occurs in the Pacific Ocean off California (San Diego, Catalina Island)
