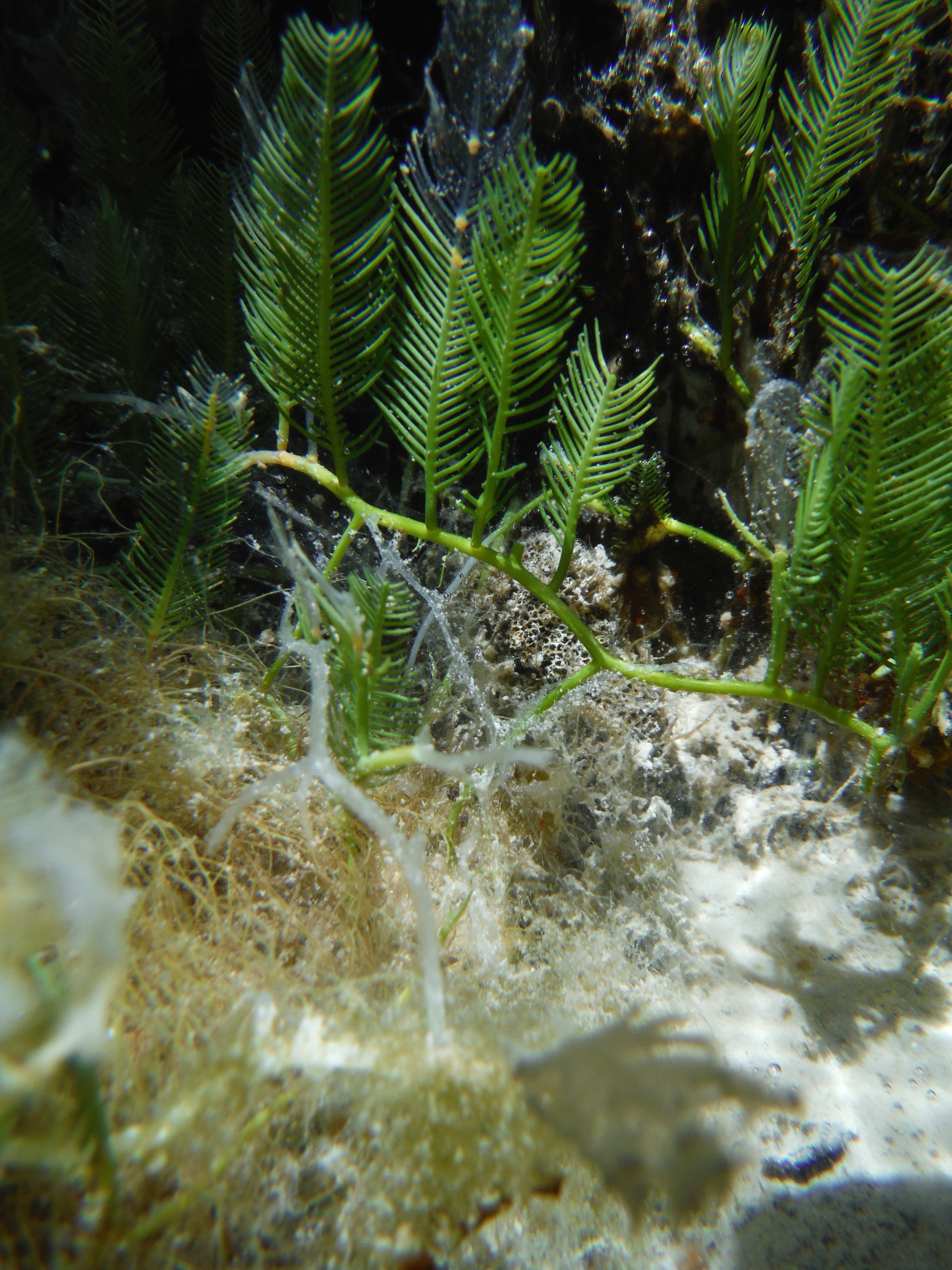
- Caulerpa sertularioides from Kewalo, Hawaii

Scientific classification
- Clade: Viridiplantae
- Division: Chlorophyta
- Class: Ulvophyceae
- Order: Bryopsidales
- Family: Caulerpaceae
- Genus: Caulerpa
- Species: C. sertularioides

Binomial name
- Caulerpa sertularioides (S.G.Gmel.) M.Howe

= Caulerpa sertularioides =

Green feather algae

Species of algae

Caulerpa sertularioides, also known as green feather algae, is a species of seaweed in the Caulerpaceae family found in warm water environments.

== Description ==
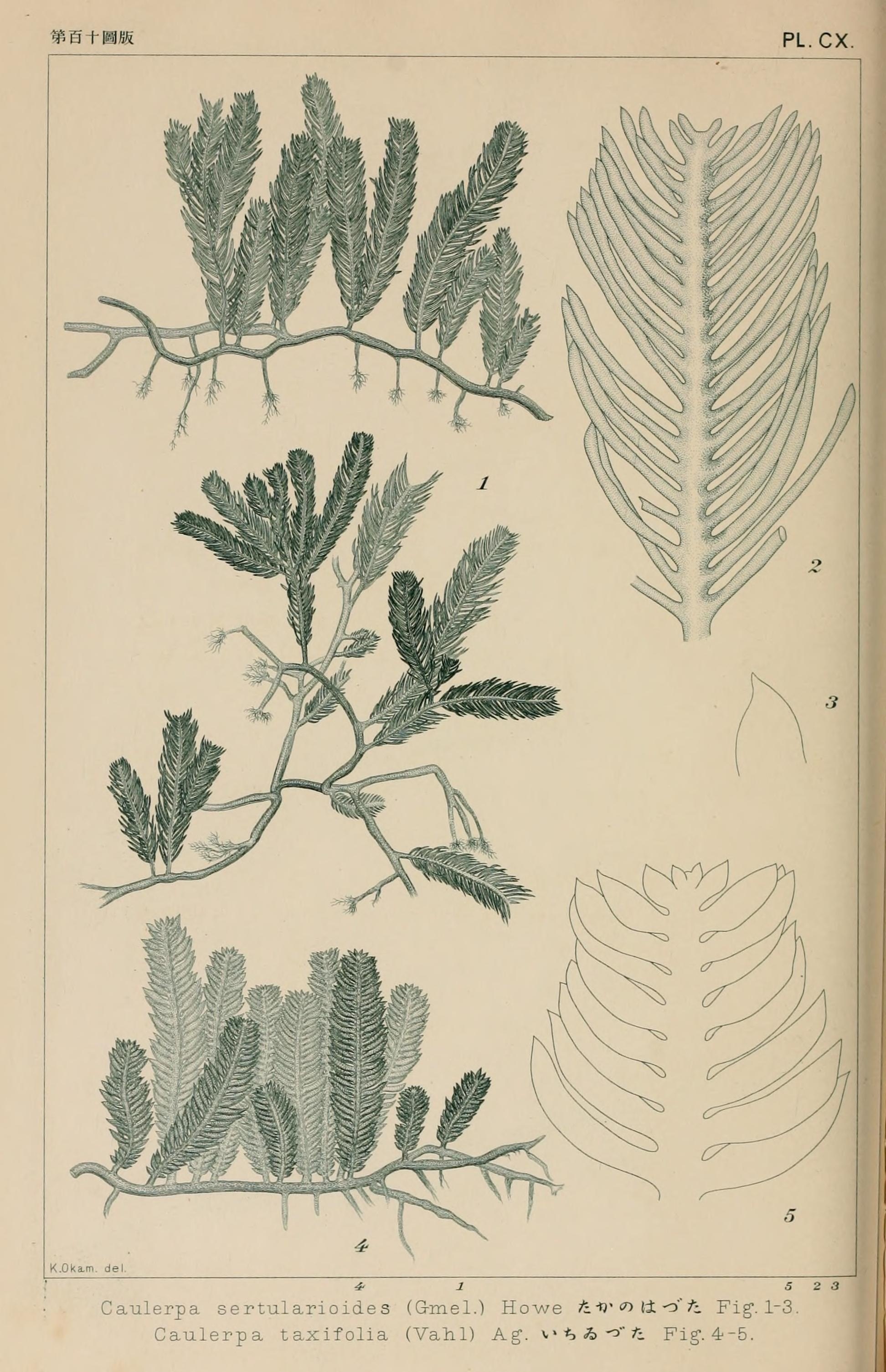
Three illustrations (Fig 1 . 1-3) of C. sertularioides displaying its "leaf" and rhizome structures (Fig 1 . 4-5 are illustrations of C. taxifolia)

The seaweed has a pale to dark-green thallus that typically grows to outward to around 0.35 to 2 metres (1.15 to 6.56 ft). It has feather-like fronds that arise from a common stolon. Each of the fronds is upright and branched. The oppositely arranged branchlets are cylindrical to needle-shaped with upcurved tips with a blunt point at the end. Each branchlet has a length of 3 to 11 millimetres (0.118 to 0.433 in) and is attached to a cylindrical axis in the middle with a diameter of 1 to 1.5 mm (0.039 to 0.059 in). Each axis connects each frond to a creeping stolon with a diameter of 2 to 2.5 mm (0.079 to 0.098 in) and a length of up to 2 metres (7 ft). Stolons are branched out to slim points and rhizoids then form from bottom surface these fork and penetrate the sandy substrate firmly anchoring the seaweed to the seafloor.

== Taxonomy ==
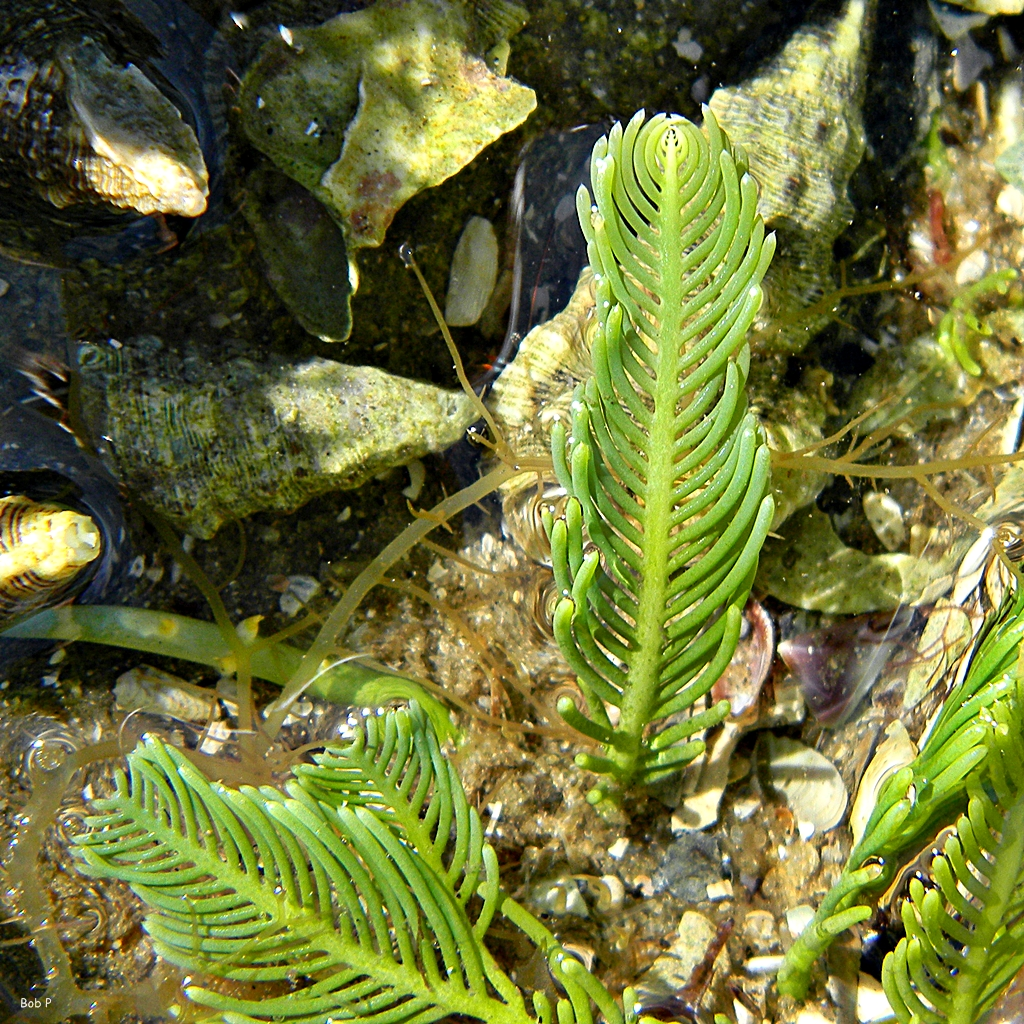
Green Feather Algae (Caulerpa sertularioides), A pretty algae species loved by green sea turtles and sea slugs in the shallow waters around Munyon Island.

The species was first formally described by the botanist and taxonomist Marshall Avery Howe in 1905 as part of the work Phycological studies - II. New Chlorophyceae, new Rhodophyceae and miscellaneous notes as published in the Bulletin of the Torrey Botanical Club. The basionym is Fucus sertularioides as described by Samuel Gottlieb Gmelin in 1768.

== Distribution ==
The species is found widely through tropical waters. In the United States it is found from North Carolina to Florida. It is also found throughout the Caribbean around Bermuda, Bahamas, Greater and Lesser Antilles and in the Gulf of Mexico and in the southern Atlantic Ocean to Brazil (Taylor 1979). It is also found in the Pacific Ocean along the Great Barrier Reef in Australia, Papua New Guinea, Philippines and Palau. In Western Australia, it is found along the coast in the Kimberley region extending south to the Gascoyne.

The species is usually part of coastal and estuarine environments where it grows in sandy areas, as seagrass beds or on and around mangrove roots. It is mostly found as a shallow-water specimen to depths of around 10 metres (33 ft) although sparse individuals have been taken from depths of up to 110 metres (361 ft).
