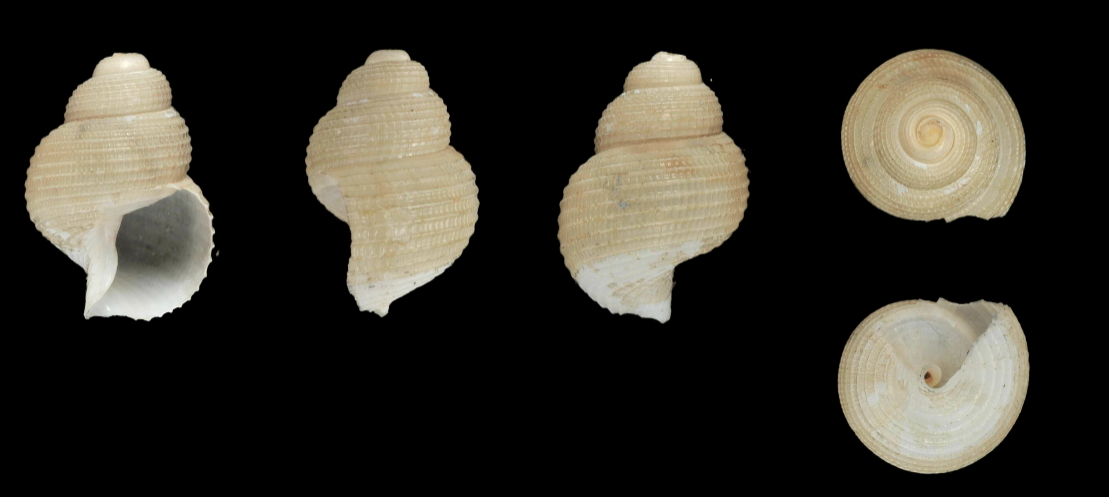
- Shell of Thalassoplanes moerchii (holotype at the Smithsonian Institution)

Scientific classification
- Kingdom: Animalia
- Phylum: Mollusca
- Class: Gastropoda
- Subclass: Caenogastropoda
- Order: Neogastropoda
- Family: Buccinidae
- Genus: Thalassoplanes
- Species: T. moerchii

Binomial name
- Thalassoplanes moerchii (Dall, 1908)

Synonyms
- Brevisiphonia circumreta Lus, 1973; Troschelia (Thalassoplanes) moerchii Dall, 1908 (superseded combination); Troschelia moerchii Dall, 1908 (superseded combination)

= Thalassoplanes moerchii =

Species of gastropod

Thalassoplanes moerchii is a species of sea snails, marine gastropod mollusks in the subfamily Parancistrolepidinae of the family Buccinidae, the true whelks.

== Description ==
The length of the shell attains 16 mm, its diameter 11 mm.

(Original description) The shell is short and stout, composed of approximately five whorls, two of which are polished, depressed, and of smooth whorls in the protoconch. The subsequent whorls are uniformly sculptured with narrow, similar, flat-topped, elevated spiral ridges—seven between the sutures and nine or ten on the body whorl. These ridges are separated by much wider, equal interspaces. Seven additional spiral threads adorn the siphonal canal. This primary sculpture is intersected by numerous (three or four per millimeter), equally spaced, flexuous, smaller, elevated axial threads that override the spiral ridges, dividing the channels into rectangular spaces. The entire shell is covered by a thin, fibrous, olivaceous periostracum.

The suture is distinct but not channelled. Whorls are turgid and evenly rounded. The aperture is nearly equal in length to the spire. The outer lip is thin and sharp (possibly reflected in adults?). The body and inner lip are slightly eroded and white. The columella is short and twisted, with its anterior edge thickened and flaring anteriorly, then obliquely attenuated. The axis is pervious. The siphonal canal is almost obsolete, lacking a siphonal fasciole.

The operculum is thin, brownish, and pinna-shaped. Its small, rounded area of attachment is surrounded by a thick deposit of polished brown callus that extends nearly to the apex.

== Distribution ==
This species occurs in the Pacific Ocean (Mexico, Russian Federation, Japan); also off New Zealand.
