= Cotonopsis phuketensis =

Scientific classification
- Kingdom: Animalia
- Phylum: Mollusca
- Class: Gastropoda
- Subclass: Caenogastropoda
- Order: Neogastropoda
- Family: Columbellidae
- Genus: Cotonopsis
- Species: C. phuketensis

Binomial name
- Cotonopsis phuketensis (Kosuge, Roussy & Muangman, 1998)

Synonyms
- Strombina phuketensis Kosuge, Roussy & Muangman, 1998 (basionym); Cotonopsis vanwalleghemi Kronenberg & Dekker, 1998

Species of gastropod

Cotonopsis phuketensis is a species of sea snail, a marine gastropod mollusk in the family Columbellidae, the dove snails.

== Description ==
The shell size varies between 30 and 50 mm (1.2 and 2.0 in).

== Distribution ==
This species is distributed in the Andaman Sea along Thailand.
