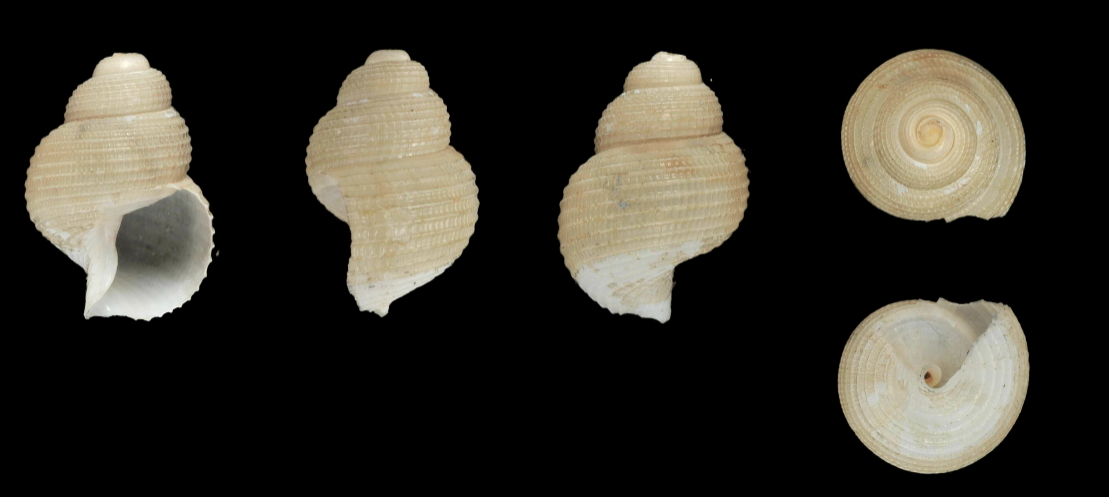
- Shell of Thalassoplanes moerchii (holotype at the Smithsonian Institution)

Scientific classification
- Kingdom: Animalia
- Phylum: Mollusca
- Class: Gastropoda
- Subclass: Caenogastropoda
- Order: Neogastropoda
- Family: Buccinidae
- Genus: Thalassoplanes; Dall, 1908

Synonyms
- Brevisiphonia Lus, 1973; Troschelia (Thalassoplanes) Dall, 1908

= Thalassoplanes =

Genus of gastropods

Thalassoplanes is a genus of sea snails, marine gastropod mollusks in the subfamily Parancistrolepidinae of the family Buccinidae, the true whelks.

== Characteristics ==
(Original description) The shell is short, with a very short siphonal canal. The operculum is straight, elongate, and wedge-shaped, its extreme apex slightly deflected to the right. The radula, typical for the group, has a formula of 1/6 + 1/0 + 1/6, with an obsolete rhachidian cusp.

The animal is blind; the male possesses a small, subcylindrical verge, lacking appendages.

== Species ==
Species within the genus Thalassoplanes include:

- Thalassoplanes moerchii (Dall, 1908)

Synonyms

- Thalassoplanes modesta (Martens, 1885): synonym of Chlanidotella modesta (E. von Martens, 1885) (superseded combination)
