= J. Bracebridge Wilson =

Australian botanist (1828–1895)

John Bracebridge Wilson (13 September 1828 – 22 October 1895) was headmaster of Geelong Grammar School in Victoria, Australia.

== History ==
Wilson was the only son of Rev. Edward Wilson, rector of Topcroft, Norfolk, England. He matriculated in 1848, when he attended St John's College, Cambridge, securing his B.A. in 1852. He then decided to try his fortune in the distant colonies, boarding the Guy Mannering for Melbourne, Victoria, arriving in November 1857. He found employment with the fledgling Geelong Grammar School, founded by the Church of England in 1855, and was soon third master under head master George Vance. The school failed financially, as a result of mismanagement, and closed its doors in June 1860. Determined to retain the students, Wilson rented temporary premises to operate as a private "High School", and was so effective that when the reconstituted Geelong Grammar opened in February 1863 Wilson was appointed head master, a position he held for the rest of his life.

Wilson was a dedicated naturalist, and known as a marine biologist, elected in 1882 a Fellow of the Linnean Society.

His death followed a brief illness; an unostentatious funeral service attended by many hundreds of past and present students was followed by burial at the Eastern Cemetery. His will stipulated that no more than £10 should be spent on the burial.

== Family ==
Wilson married Oriana Maria Rowcroft (died in 1911) at Geelong on 7 April 1863. She was a daughter of Horatio Nelson "Horace" Rowcroft (1806–1878), editor of the Geelong Advertiser 1867–1869, and brother of Charles Rowcroft. They had two daughters:

- Oriana Mary "May" Bracebridge-Wilson married Albert Finchett Garrard on 27 June 1894.
- Maud Knyvet Bracebridge-Wilson married Alban Cyril Morley on 9 October 1900.

Rev. H. Shaw Millard, headmaster of Newcastle Grammar School, was a cousin and close school friend while at Cambridge.

Lieutenant-General Sir Archdale Wilson (1803–1874) was an uncle.
