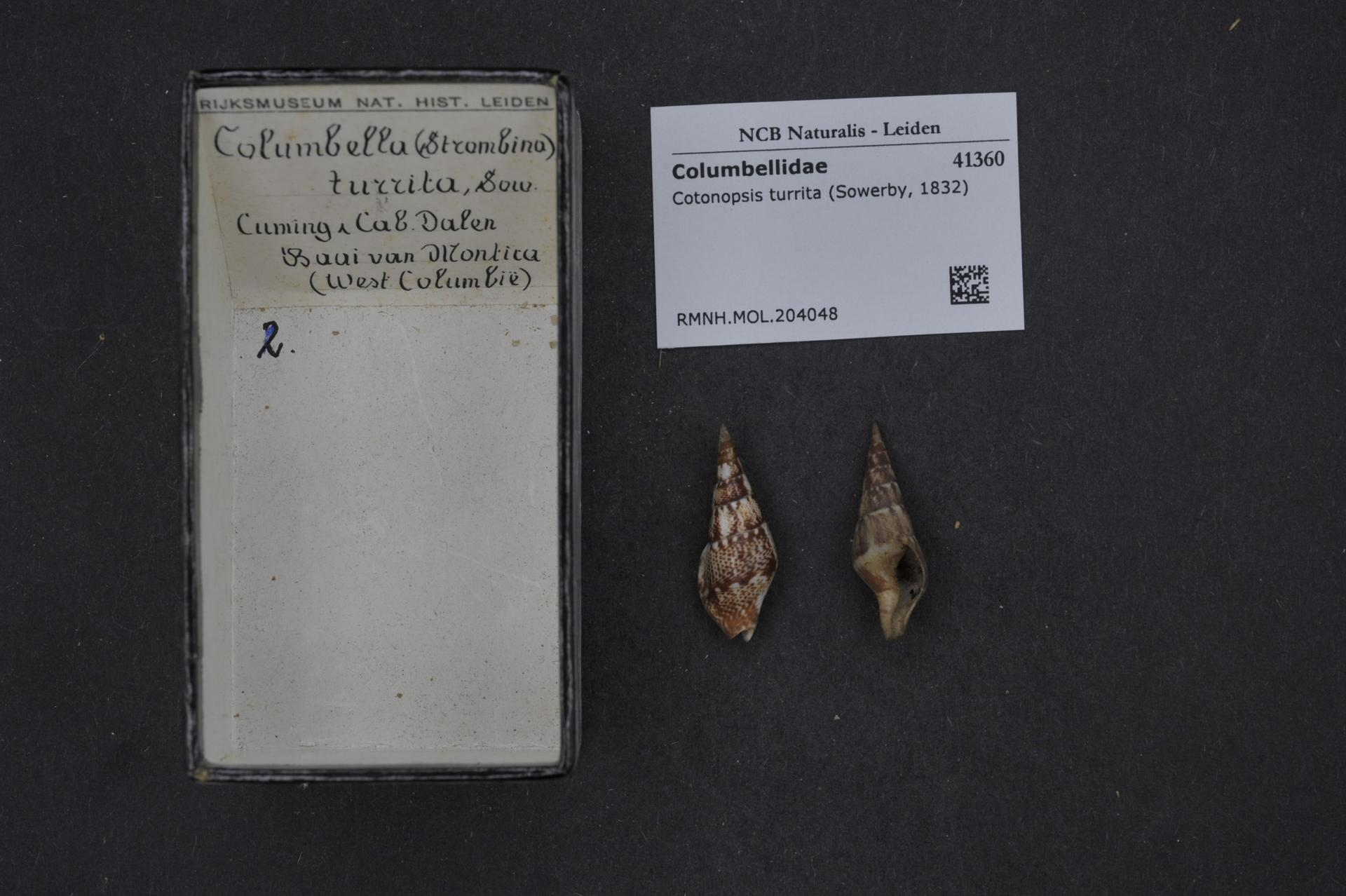

Scientific classification
- Kingdom: Animalia
- Phylum: Mollusca
- Class: Gastropoda
- Subclass: Caenogastropoda
- Order: Neogastropoda
- Family: Columbellidae
- Genus: Cotonopsis
- Species: C. turrita

Binomial name
- Cotonopsis turrita (G.B. Sowerby I, 1832)

Synonyms
- Cotonopsis (Turrina) turrita (G.B. Sowerby I, 1832); Columbella elegans G.B. Sowerby I, 1832; Columbella turrita G.B. Sowerby I, 1832; Strombina elegans Li, 1930 - Elegant Strombina; Strombina turrita G.B. Sowerby I, 1832

= Cotonopsis turrita =

Cotonopsis

Species of gastropod

Cotonopsis turrita is a species of sea snails in the family Columbellidae. It is found in West America.
