= Maintenonia blignautae =

Scientific classification
- Kingdom: Animalia
- Phylum: Mollusca
- Class: Gastropoda
- Subclass: Caenogastropoda
- Order: Neogastropoda
- Family: Columbellidae
- Genus: Maintenonia
- Species: M. blignautae

Binomial name
- Maintenonia blignautae (Kilburn, 1998)

Synonyms
- Anachis (Suturoglypta) blignautae Kilburn, 1998; Anachis blignautae Kilburn, 1998; Strombina blignautae (Kilburn, 1998); Suturoglypta blignautae (Kilburn, 1998)

Species of gastropod

Maintenonia blignautae is a species of sea snail in the family Columbellidae. It is known only from the coast of South Africa.

== Taxonomy and history ==
This species was first described as Anachis blignautae in 1998 by Richard Kilburn, based on two juvenile specimens collected from crayfish traps.

== Distribution and habitat ==
Maintenonia blignautae is a marine species known from the continental slope off Richards Bay in KwaZulu-Natal, South Africa. The type specimen was collected at a depth of 600 m (2,000 ft).
