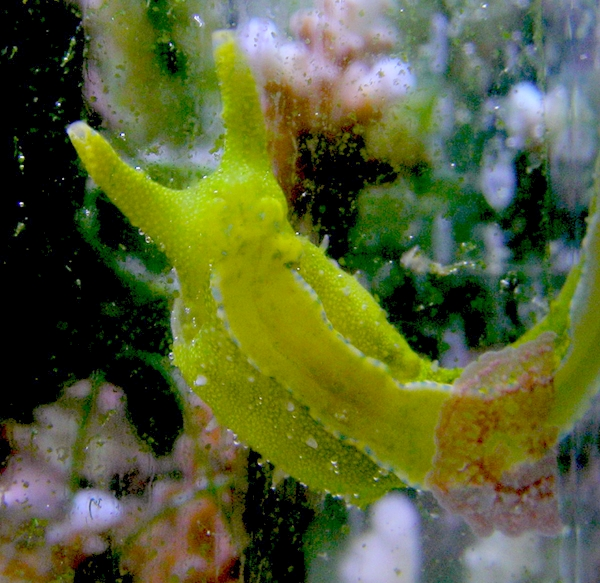
- View of the underside of Oxynoe olivacea
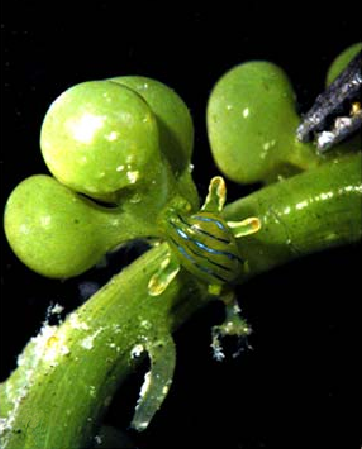
- Lobiger viridis on Caulerpa sp. Locality: Lizard Island, Great Barrier Reef. The length of the slug is about 5mm

Scientific classification
- Kingdom: Animalia
- Phylum: Mollusca
- Class: Gastropoda
- Superorder: Sacoglossa
- Superfamily: Oxynooidea
- Family: Oxynoidae; Stoliczka, 1868 (1847)

Synonyms
- Lobiger Krohn, 1847; Lophopleurella Zilch, 1956; Oxynoe Rafinesque, 1814; Roburnella Ev. Marcus, 1982

= Oxynoidae =

Family of gastropods

Oxynoidae is a family of sea snails, bubble snails, marine gastropod mollusks in the superfamily Oxynooidea, an opisthobranch group.

This family has no subfamilies.

== Genera ==
The following three genera or four are included in the family Oxynoidae:

- Lobiger Krohn, 1847
- Lophopleurella Zilch, 1956 with the only species in the genus: Lophopleurella capensis (Thiele, 1912) from South Africa
- Oxynoe Rafinesque, 1814
- Roburnella Marcus, 1982 with the only species Roburnella wilsoni (Tate, 1889)

Invalid taxa placed in Oxynoidae include:

- Icarus gravesii Forbes, 1844 - type locality: Aegean Sea
- Lophocercus krohnii A. Adams, 1854 - type locality: Hawaiian Islands :
- Lophocercus sieboldii Krohn, 1847 - type locality: Messina, Italy : synonym of Oxynoe olivacea Rafinesque, 1814
- Lophocercus viridis Pease, 1861 : synonym of Oxynoe viridis (Pease, 1861)
