= Otto Andreas Lowson Mörch =

Danish zoologist (1828–1878)

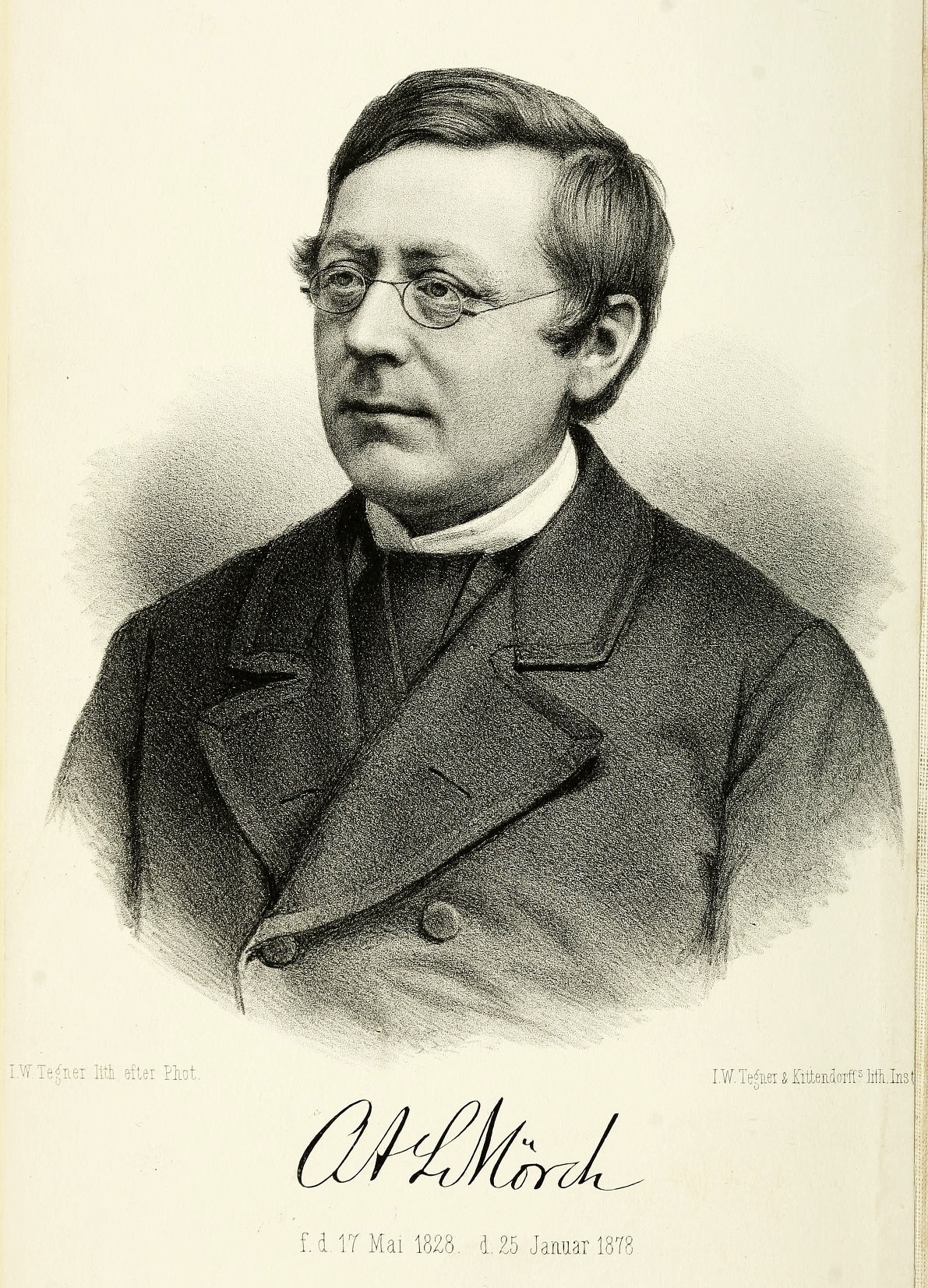
- Born: 17 May 1828; Lund, Sweden
- Died: 25 January 1878 (aged 49); Nice
- Other name: Otto Andreas Lowson Mørch
- Education: Copenhagen Borgerdydskole; Metropolitan school, Copenhagen
- Known for: Describing species of fossil and extant molluscs.
- Scientific career
- Fields: Zoologist, especially malacology
- Institutions: University Museum, Copenhagen

Otto Andreas Lowson Mörch (his last name also spelled Mørch) (17 May, 1828 – 25 January, 1878) was a Danish zoologist who was known for his work in malacology, the study of molluscs. He described numerous species both of fossil and extant molluscs.

== Life and work ==
Mörch was born in Lund where his father Otto Josias worked as a gardener at the university botanical garden. His mother Dorothea Juliane née Sjobeck came from a Swedish family while his father was of a Danish lineage with most of his ancestors being priests. Their grandfather Andreas Lowson Mørch was parish priest at Dronninglund in Vendsyssel. His early education was under private tutors and he studied Latin before joining the Copenhagen Borgerdydskole in 1837. He then went to the Metropolitan school, leaving it in 1843 following the death of his father and subsequent pecuniary problems. He had attended lectures by Schouw, Eschricht and Forchhammer and his father had helped buy books on natural science. He also began to collect specimens and became an amanuensis to Henrik Henriksen Beck in 1844 at the Copenhagen museum. Beck found Mörch so much more knowledgeable and capable that he felt threatened. In 1847, Mörch was offered a position at the University Museum by professor Japetus Steenstrup whose lectures he attended as well. He did not have to join military service due to short sight. He worked on the fossil mollusc collections under Johan Georg Forchhammer and in 1887, Johannes Frederik Johnstrup put him in charge of examining the Faxekalken molluscs. In 1853, he visited Germany, in 1854 England, France, Netherlands and in 1856, he visited Oslo, and London, examining numerous collections there. In 1869, he took up residence in Nice in France for his health with visits home each year. He died at Nice from a lung infection.

== Taxa described ==
Bibliography and taxa described by Otto Andreas Lowson Mörch include:

1863

(in French) Mörch O. A. L. (1863). "Revision des especes du genre Oxynoe Rafinesque, et Lobiger Krohn". Journal de Conchyliologie 11: 43-48.

- Oxynoe antillarum Mörch, 1863 - on page 46.

1864

(in Danish) Mörch O. A. L. (1864). "Fortegnelse over de i Danmark forekommende land- og ferskvandsblöddyr". Videnskabelige Meddelelser fra den Naturhistoriske Forening i Kjöbenhavn (2)1863(17-22): 265–367.

- Valvata macrostoma Mörch, 1864
- Zonitidae Mörch, 1864, also known as the "true glass snails".

== Taxa named after Mörch ==
- Glossodoris moerchi (Bergh, 1879)
- Turbonilla mörchi Dall & Bartsch, 1907
