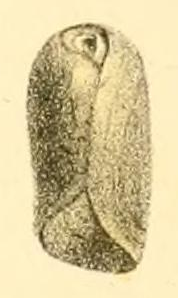
- A drawing of the shell of Cylindrobulla beauii from its original description by Paul Henri Fischer (1857)

Scientific classification
- Kingdom: Animalia
- Phylum: Mollusca
- Class: Gastropoda
- Superorder: Sacoglossa
- Superfamily: Oxynooidea
- Family: Cylindrobullidae; Thiele, 1931
- Genus: Cylindrobulla; P. Fischer, 1857

= Cylindrobulla =

Genus of gastropods

Cylindrobulla is a genus of sea snails or bubble snails, marine gastropod mollusks in the clade Sacoglossa.

Cylindrobulla is the type genus of the family Cylindrobullidae and it is the only genus in the family.

== Taxonomy ==
The suborder Cylindrobulloidea used to be recognized as monogeneric suborder; in other words there was only one family in the suborder, the family Cylindrobullidae, and only one genus Cylindrobulla.

=== 1996 taxonomy ===
It was treated by Jensen (1996) as a sister group of Sacoglossa and placed it in the new order Cylindrobullacea.

=== 1998 taxonomy ===
Mikkelsen (1998) has argued that the genus Cylindrobulla actually belongs in Oxynoacea within shelled Sacoglossa. This change in taxonomy was suggested on the basis of the similarity in many characteristics: digestive, sexual, pallial (= concerning the mantle), and the nervous system.

=== 2005 taxonomy ===
According to the taxonomy by Bouchet & Rocroi (2005), is the Cylindrobullidae the only family in the superfamily Cylindrobulloidea and Cylindrobulloidea is the only superfamily within the group Cylindrobullida in the informal group Opisthobranchia.

According to the taxonomy of the Gastropoda by Bouchet & Rocroi (2005) the family Cylindrobullidae has no subfamilies.

=== 2010 taxonomy ===
Molecular phylogeny analysis by Maeda et al. (2010) have confirmed placement of Cylindrobulla within Sacoglossa.

== Genera ==
Species within the genus Cylindrobulla include:

- Cylindrobulla beauii P. Fischer, 1857 - the type species of the genus Cylindrobulla
- Cylindrobulla gigas Mikkelsen, 1998
- Cylindrobulla phuketi Jensen, 1990
- Cylindrobulla sculpta G. Nevill & H. Nevill, 1869
- Cylindrobulla turtoni Bartsch, 1915
- Cylindrobulla xishaensis Lin, 1978

Synonyms:

- Cylindrobulla californica Hamatani, 1971 is a synonym for Ascobulla californica (Hamatani, 1971)
- Cylindrobulla fragilis (Jeffreys, 1856) is a synonym for Ascobulla fragilis (Jeffreys, 1856)
- Cylindrobulla japonica Hamatani, 1969 is a synonym for Ascobulla japonica (Hamatani, 1969)

== See also ==
- Ascobulla - species in this genus looks externally the same, but they differ in internal anatomy. Ascobulla belongs to Volvatellidae.
