= B. typica =

B. typica may refer to:

- Ballognatha typica, a spider species found in Karakorum
- Berthelinia typica, a sea snail species

== See also ==
- Typica (disambiguation)
