= Ascobulla ulla =

Scientific classification
- Kingdom: Animalia
- Phylum: Mollusca
- Class: Gastropoda
- Superorder: Sacoglossa
- Family: Volvatellidae
- Genus: Ascobulla
- Species: A. ulla

Binomial name
- Ascobulla ulla (Er. Marcus & Ev. Marcus, 1970)

Synonyms
- Cylindrobulla ulla Er. Marcus & Ev. Marcus, 1970 (original combination)

Species of gastropod

Ascobulla ulla is a species of sea snail, a marine gastropod sacoglossan mollusk in the family Volvatellidae.

== Distribution ==
This marine species occurs off Brazil.
