= Photosymbiosis =

Type of symbiotic relationship

Photosymbiosis is a type of symbiosis where one of the organisms is capable of photosynthesis.

Examples of photosymbiosis

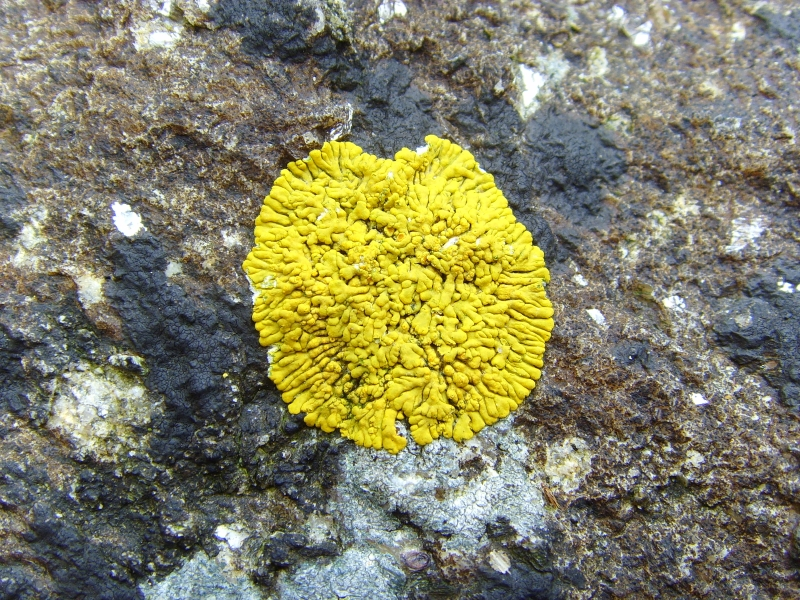
Lichen Variospora thallincola growing on rock

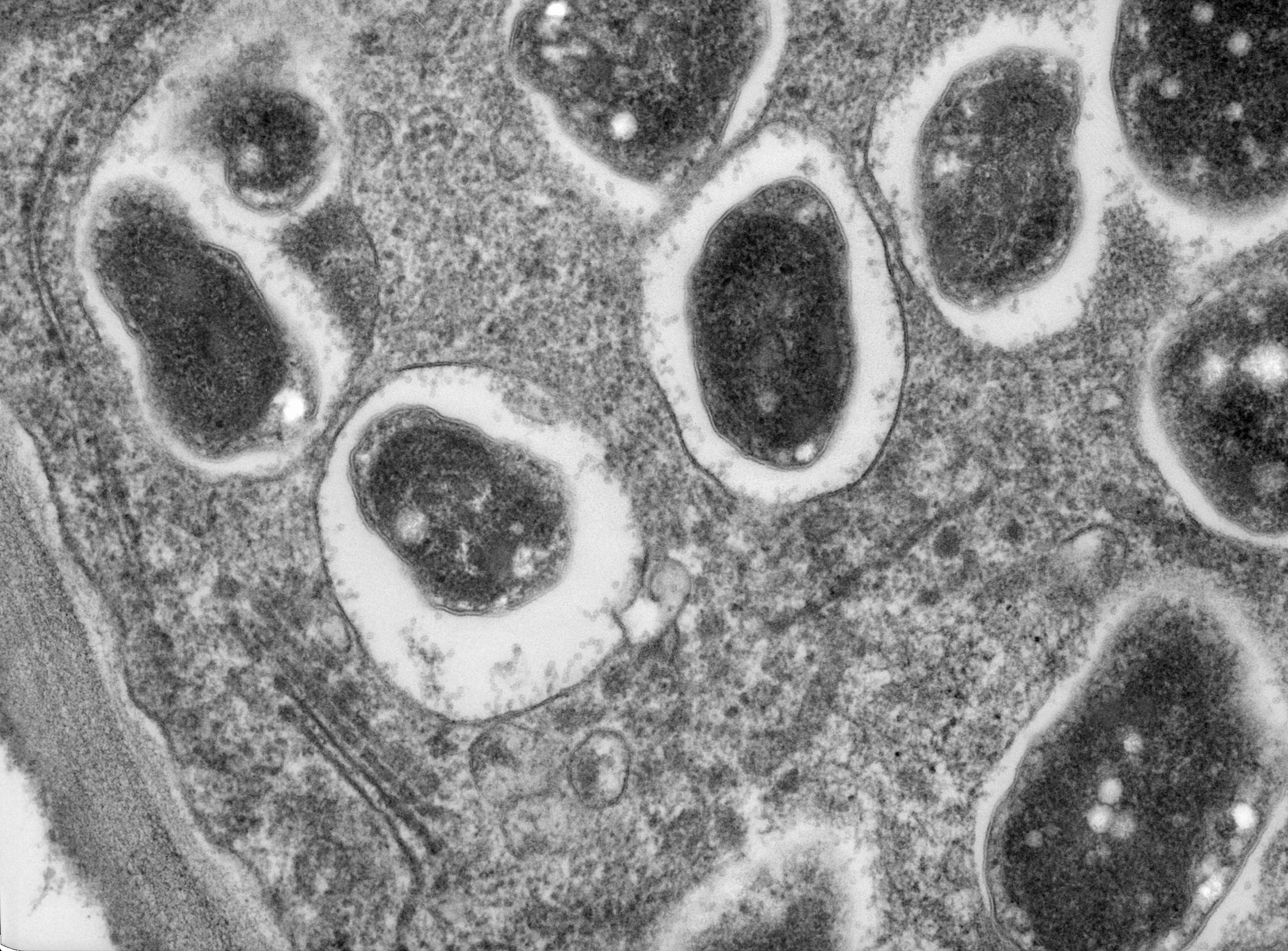
Cross section through a Glycine max (soybean) root nodule. Nitrogen fixing bacteria, Bradyrhizobium japonicum, infect the roots and establish a symbiosis. This image shows part of a cell with single bacteroids (bacterium-like cells or modified bacterial cells) within their symbiosomes.

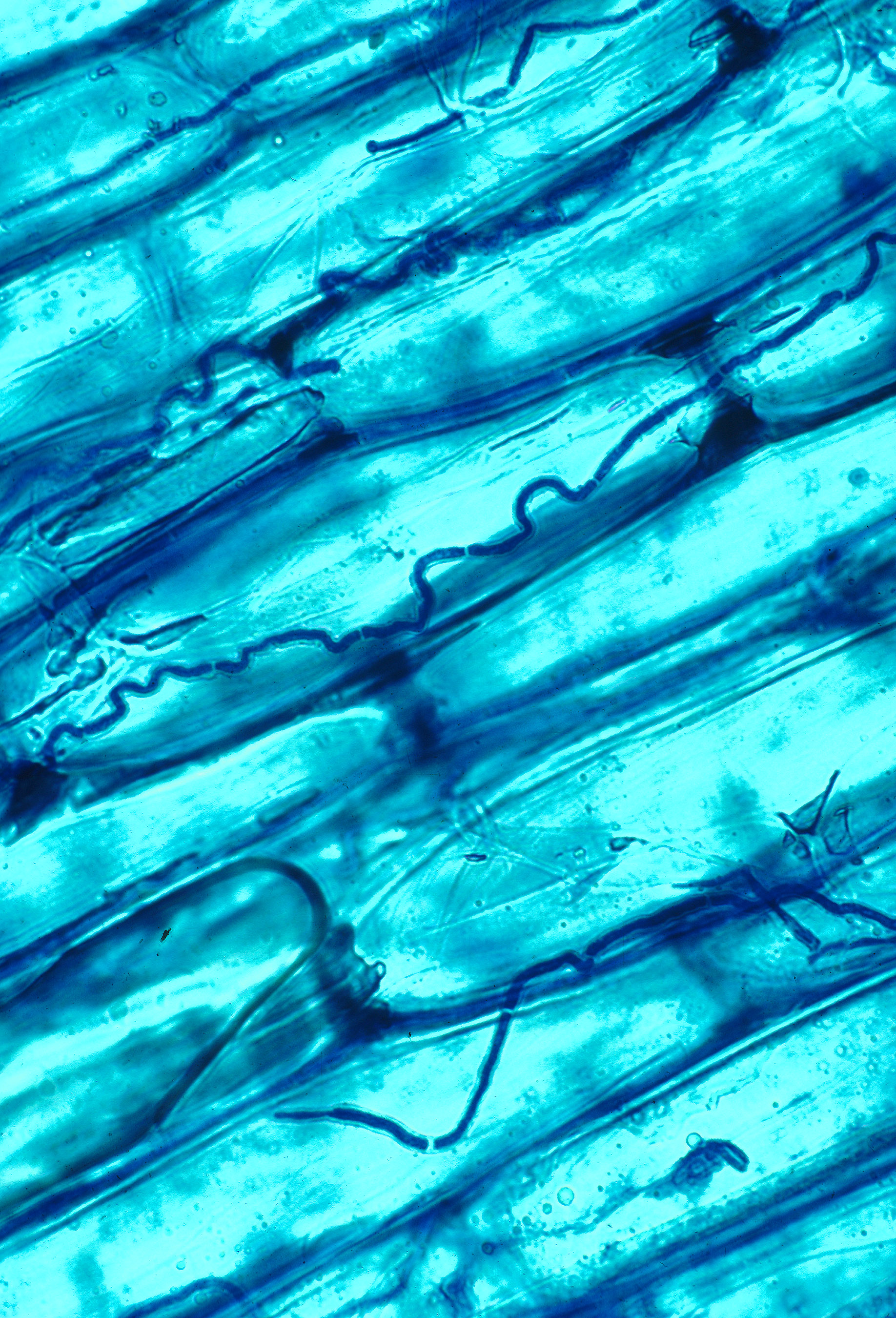
Tall fescue grass leaf sheath tissue with Neotyphodium coenophialum mycelia inhabiting the intercellular spaces (spaces between the grass cells)

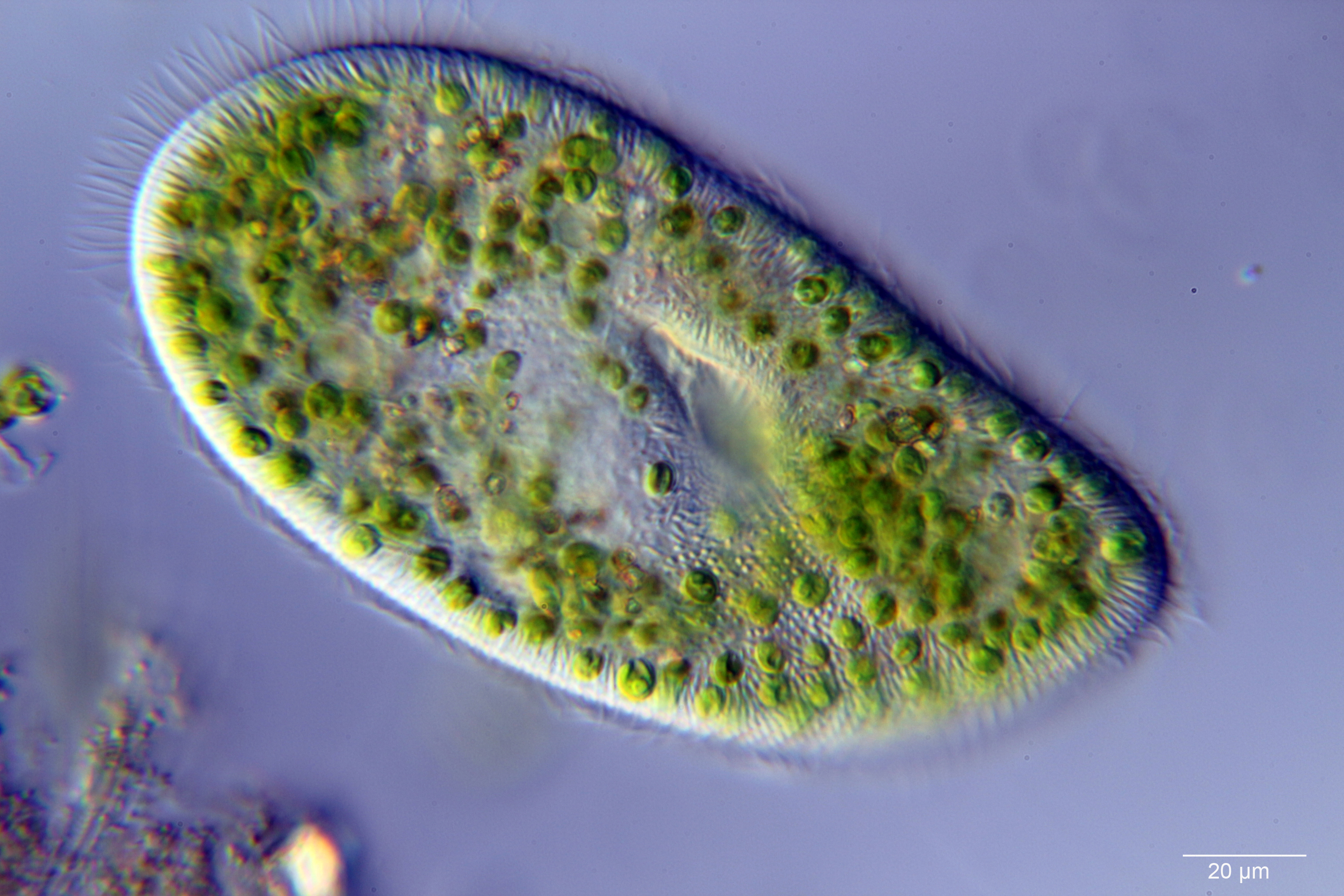
A ciliate, Paramecium bursaria, with green zoochlorellae living inside it as endosymbionts

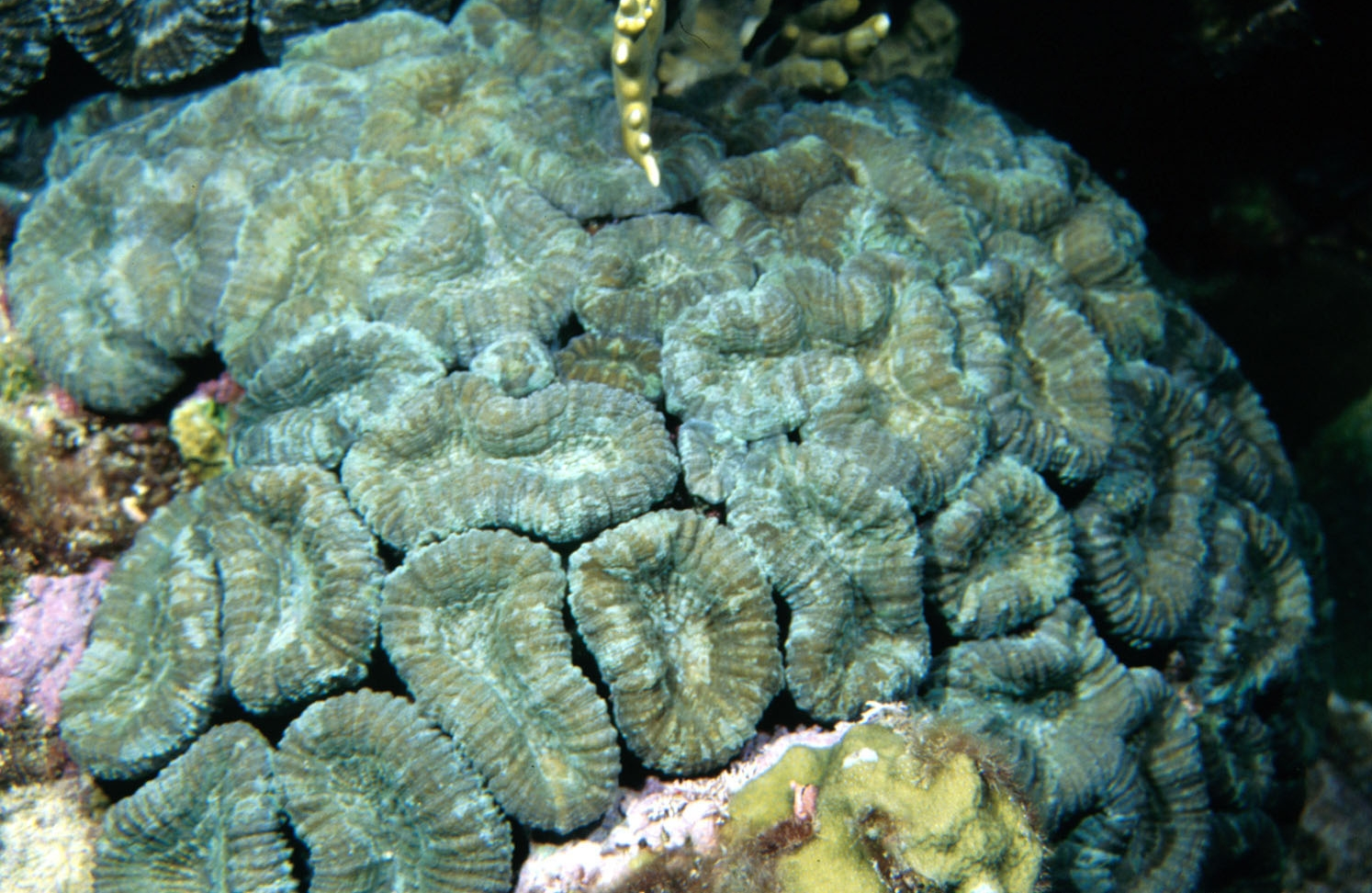
Mussa angulosa coral

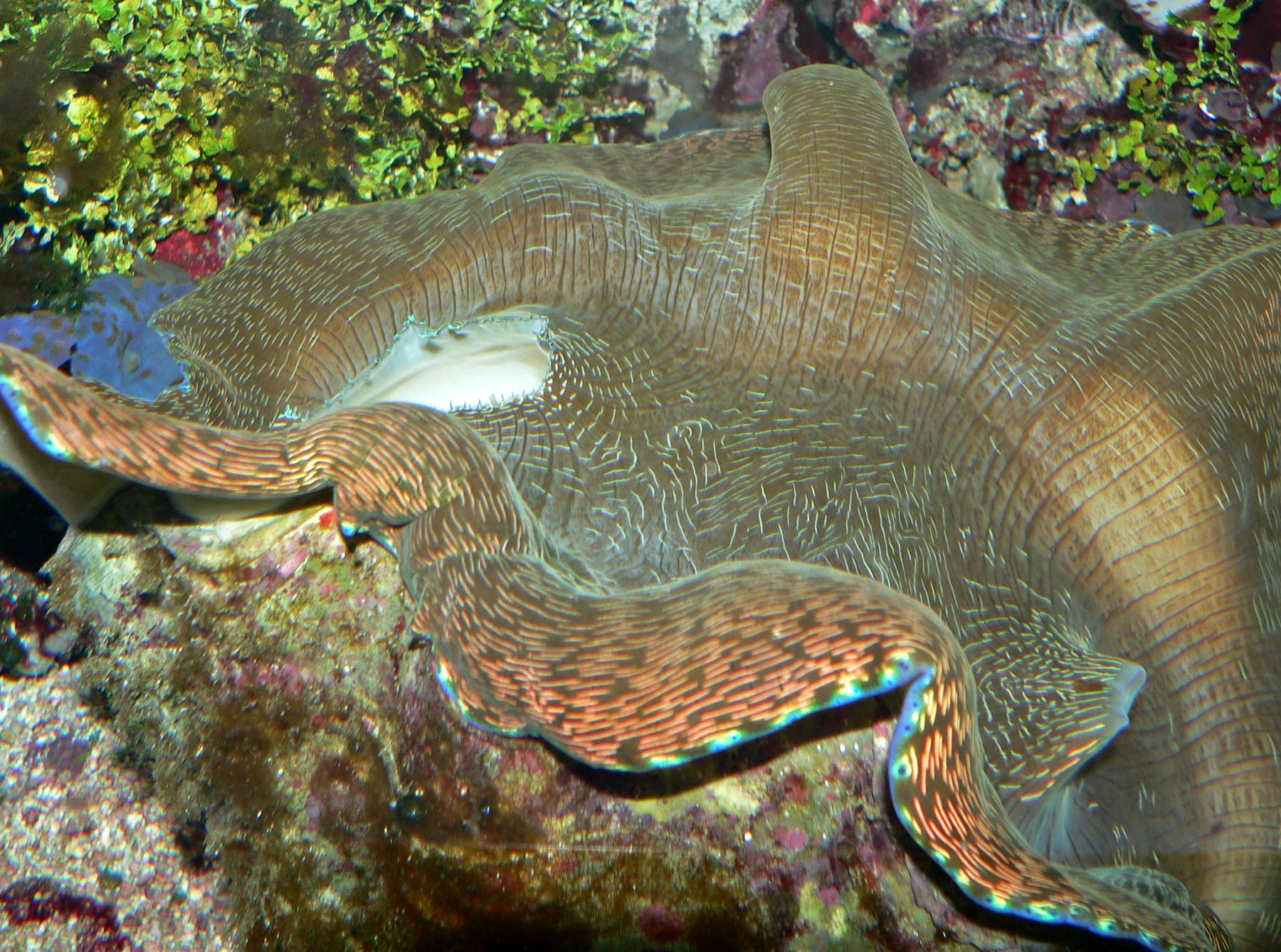
Southern giant clam Tridacna derasa

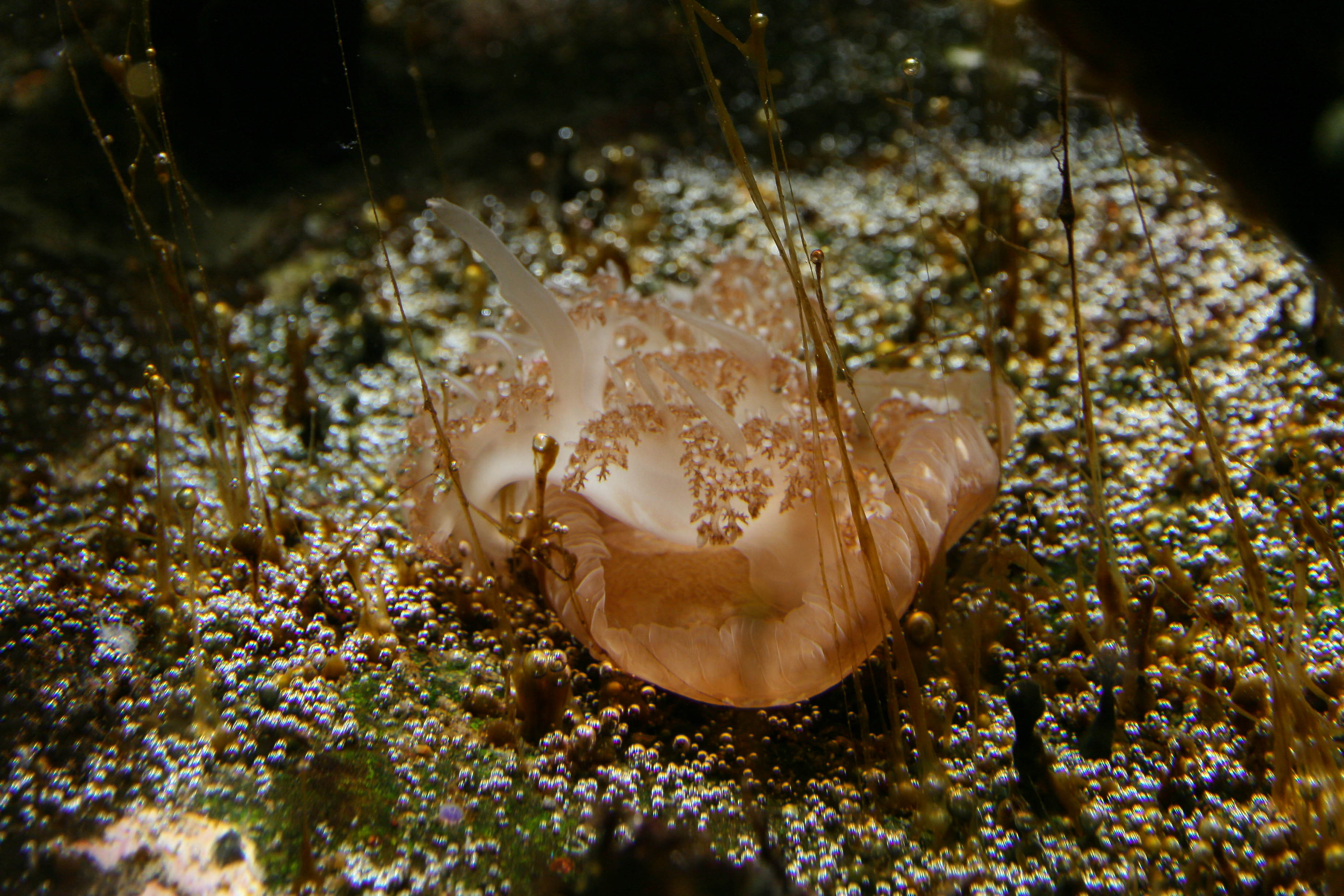
Upside-down jellyfish Cassiopea xamachana

Examples of photosymbiotic relationships include those in lichens, mycorrhizas, plankton, ciliates, and many marine organisms including corals, fire corals, giant clams, and jellyfish.

Photosymbiosis is important in the development, maintenance, and evolution of terrestrial and aquatic ecosystems, for example in biological soil crusts, soil formation, supporting highly diverse microbial populations in soil and water, and coral reef growth and maintenance..

When one organism lives within another symbiotically it's called endosymbiosis.

Endophytes (symbiotic archaea, bacteria, or fungi that live within a plant for at least part of their lifecycles) play an important role in aiding plants with pathogens and disease, water stress, heat stress, nutrient availability, poor soil quality, salinity, and herbivory.

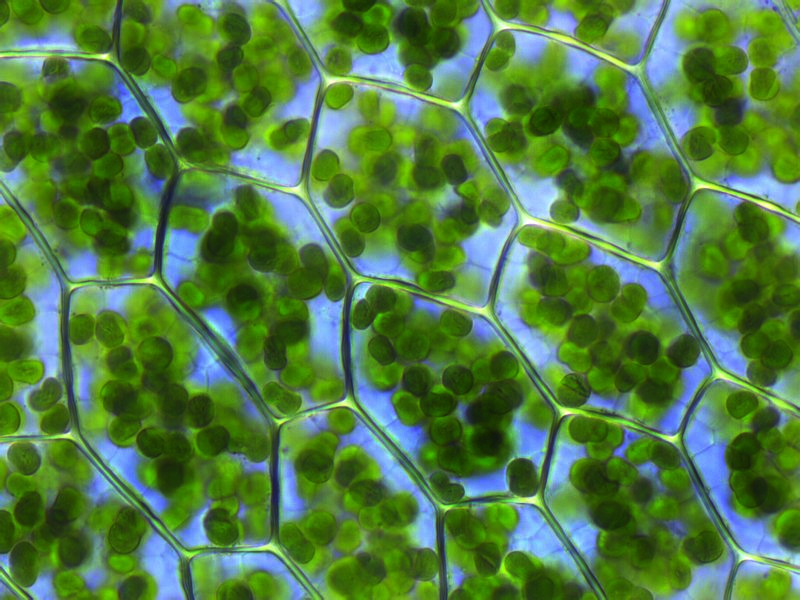
Plagiomnium affine moss cells with visible chloroplasts—a type of plastid.

Photosymbiotic relationships where microalgae and/or cyanobacteria live within a heterotrophic host organism (an organism that doesn’t make its own food), are believed to have led to eukaryotes acquiring photosynthesis, and to the evolution of plants.

== Occurrence ==
=== Mycorrhizas ===
Symbiotic mycorrhizal associations, where fungi hyphae and plant roots become interconnected and form a cellular interface, are present in approximately 80% of all plant species studied.

=== Lichens ===
Lichens represent an association between one or more fungal mycobionts and one or more photosynthetic algal or cyanobacterial photobionts. The mycobiont provides protection from predation and desiccation, while the photobiont provides energy in the form of fixed carbon. Cyanobacterial partners are also capable of fixing nitrogen for the fungal partner. Recent work suggests that non-photosynthetic bacterial microbiomes associated with lichens may also have functional significance to lichens.

Most mycobiont partners derive from the ascomycetes, and the largest class of lichenized fungi is Lecanoromycetes. The vast majority of lichens derive photobionts from Chlorophyta (green algae). The co-evolutionary dynamics between mycobionts and photobionts are still unclear, as many photobionts are capable of free-living, and many lichenized fungi display traits adaptive to lichenization such as the capacity to withstand higher levels of reactive oxygen species (ROS), the conversion of sugars to polypols that help withstand dedication, and the downregulation of fungal virulence. However, it is still unclear whether these are derived or ancestral traits.

Currently described photobiont species number about 100, far less than the 19,000 described species of fungal mycobionts, and factors such as geography can predominate over mycobiont preference. Phylogenetic analyses in lichenized fungi have suggested that, throughout evolutionary history, there has been repeated loss of photosymbionts, switching of photosymbionts, and independent lichenization events in previously unrelated fungal taxa. Loss of lichenization has likely led to the coexistence of non-lichenized fungi and lichenized fungi in lichens.

=== Sponges ===
Sponges (phylum Porifera) have a large diversity of photosymbiote associations. Photosymbiosis is found in four classes of Porifera (Demospongiae, Hexactinellida, Homoscleromorpha, and Calcarea), and known photosynthetic partners are cyanobacteria, chloroflexi, dinoflagellates, and red (Rhodophyta) and green (Chlorophyta) algae. Relatively little is known about the evolutionary history of sponge photosymbiois due to a lack of genomic data. However, it has been shown that photosymbiotes are acquired vertically (transmission from parent to offspring) and/or horizontally (acquired from the environment). Photosymbiotes can supply up to half of the host sponge's respiratory demands and can support sponges during times of nutrient stress.

=== Cnidaria ===
Members of certain classes in phylum Cnidaria are known for photosymbiotic partnerships. Members of corals (Class Anthozoa) in the orders Hexacorallia and Octocorallia form well-characterized partnerships with the dinoflagellate genus Symbiodinium. Some jellyfish (class Scyphozoa) in the genus Cassiopea (upside-down jellyfish) also possess Symbiodinium. Certain species in the genus Hydra (class Hydrozoa) also harbor green algae and form a stable photosymbiosis.

The evolution of photosymbiosis in corals was likely critical for the global establishment of coral reefs. Corals are likewise adapted to eject damaged photosymbionts that generate high levels of toxic reactive oxygen species, a process known as bleaching. The identity of the Symbiodinium photosymbiont can change in corals, although this depends largely on the mode of transmission: some species vertically transmit their algal partners through their eggs, while other species acquire environmental dinoflagellates as newly-released eggs. Since algae are not preserved in the coral fossil record, understanding the evolutionary history of the symbiosis is difficult.

=== Bilaterians ===
In basal bilaterians, photosymbiosis in marine or brackish systems is present only in the family Convolutidae. In the group Acoela there is limited knowledge on the symbionts present, and they have been vaguely identified as zoochlorella or zooxanthella. Some species have a symbiotic relationship with the chlorophyte Tetraselmis convolutae while others have a symbiotic relationship with the dinoflagellates Symbiodinium, Amphidinium klebsii, or diatoms in the genus Licomorpha.

In freshwater systems, photosymbiosis is present in platyhelminths belonging to the Rhabdocoela group. In this group, members of the Provorticidae, Dalyeliidae, and Typhloplanidae families are symbiotic. Members of Provorticidae likely feed on diatoms and retain their symbionts. Typhloplanidae have symbiotic relationships with the chlorophytes in the genus Chlorella.

=== Molluscs ===
Photosymbiosis is taxonomically restricted in Mollusca. Tropical marine bivalves in the Cardiidae family form a symbiotic relationship with the dinoflagellate Symbiodinium. This family boasts large organisms often referred to as giant clams and their large size is attributed to the establishment of these symbiotic relationships. Additionally, the Symbiodinium are hosted extracellularly, which is relatively rare. The only known freshwater bivalve with a symbiotic relationship are in the genus Anodonta which hosts the chlorophyte Chlorella in the gills and mantle of the host. In bivalves, photosymbiosis is thought to have evolved twice, in the genus Anodonta and in the family Cardiidae. However, how it has evolved in Cardiidae could have occurred through different gains or losses in the family.

=== Gastropods ===
In gastropods, photosymbiosis can be found in several genera.

The species Strombus gigas hosts Symbiodinium which is acquired during the larval stage, at which point it is a mutualistic relationship. However, during the adult stage, Symbiodinium becomes parasitic as the shell prevents photosynthesis.

Another group of gastropods, heterobranch sea slugs, have two different systems for symbiosis. The first, Nudibranchia, acquire their symbionts through feeding on cnidarian prey that are in symbiotic relationships. In Nudibranchs, photosymbiosis has evolved twice, in Melibe and Aeolidida. In Aeolidida it is likely there have been several gains and losses of photosymbiosis as most genera include both photosymbiotic and non-photosymbiotic species. The second, Sacoglossa, removes chloroplasts from macroalgae (seaweed) when feeding and sequesters them into their digestive tract at which point they are called kleptoplasts. Whether these kleptoplasts maintain their photosynthetic capabilities depends on the host species’ ability to digest them properly. In this group, functional kleptoplasty has been acquired twice, in Costasiellidae and Plakobranchacea.

=== Chordates ===
Photosymbiosis is relatively uncommon in chordate species. One such example of photosymbiosis is in ascidians, the sea squirts. In the genus Didemnidae, 30 species establish symbiotic relationships. The photosynthetic ascidians are associated with cyanobacteria in the genus of Prochloron as well as, in some cases, the species Synechocystis trididemni. The 30 species with a symbiotic relationship span four genera where the congeners (species within the same genus) are primarily non-symbiotic, suggesting multiple origins of photosymbiosis in ascidians.

In addition to sea squirts, embryos of some amphibian species (Ambystoma maculatum, Ambystoma gracile, Ambystoma jeffersonium, Ambystoma trigrinum, Hynobius nigrescens, Lithobates sylvaticus, and Lithobates aurora) form symbiotic relationships with the green alga in the genus of Oophila. This algae is present in the egg masses of the species, causing them to appear green and providing oxygen and carbohydrates to the embryos. Similarly, little is known about the evolution of symbiosis in amphibians, but there appear to be multiple origins.

=== Protists ===
Photosymbiosis has evolved multiple times in the protist taxa Ciliophora, Foraminifera, Radiolaria, Dinoflagellata, and diatoms. Foraminifera and Radiolaria are planktonic taxa that serve as primary producers in open ocean communities. Photosynthetic plankton species associate with the symbiotes of dinoflagellates, diatoms, rhodophytes, chlorophytes, and cyanophytes that can be transferred both vertically and horizontally. In Foraminifera, benthic species will either have a symbiotic relationship with Symbiodinium or retain the chloroplasts present in algal prey species. The planktonic species of Foraminifera associate primarily with Pelagodinium. These species are often considered indicator species due to their bleaching in response to environmental stressors. In the Radiolarian group Acantharia, photosynthetic species inhabit surface waters whereas non-photosynthetic species inhabit deeper waters. Photosynthetic Acantharia are associated with similar microalgae as the Foraminifera groups, but were also found to be associated with Phaeocystis, Heterocapsa, Scrippsiella, and Azadinium which were not previously known to be involved in photosynthetic relationships. In addition, several of the species present in symbiotic relationships with Acantharia were oftentimes identical to the free-living species, suggesting horizontal transfer of symbiotes. This provides insight into the evolutionary patterns responsible for these symbiotic relationships, suggesting that the selection for symbiosis is relatively weak and symbiosis is likely a result of the adaptive capacity of the host plankton species.

== See also ==
- Holobiont
