= Berthelinia caribbea =

Scientific classification
- Kingdom: Animalia
- Phylum: Mollusca
- Class: Gastropoda
- Superorder: Sacoglossa
- Family: Juliidae
- Genus: Berthelinia
- Species: B. caribbea

Binomial name
- Berthelinia caribbea Edmunds, 1963

Species of gastropod

Berthelinia caribbea is a species of a sea snail with a shell comprising two separate hinged pieces or valves. It is a marine gastropod mollusc in the family Juliidae.

== Distribution ==
The type locality for this species is Port Royal, Jamaica.

== Description ==
This species has a translucent greenish colour. There may be a few brown lines on the body and the head.

== Ecology ==
Berthelinia caribbea feeds on Caulerpa verticillata.
