= Julia mishimaensis =

Scientific classification
- Kingdom: Animalia
- Phylum: Mollusca
- Class: Gastropoda
- Superorder: Sacoglossa
- Family: Juliidae
- Genus: Julia
- Species: J. mishimaensis

Binomial name
- Julia mishimaensis Kawaguti & Yamasu, 1982

Species of gastropod

Julia mishimaensis is a species of a sea snail with a shell comprising two separate hinged pieces or valves. It is a marine gastropod mollusk in the family Juliidae.

== Distribution ==
The type locality for this species is Yamaguchi Prefecture, Japan.

This species is found in the eastern Pacific from Mexico to Peru.
