= Julia burni =

Scientific classification
- Kingdom: Animalia
- Phylum: Mollusca
- Class: Gastropoda
- Superorder: Sacoglossa
- Family: Juliidae
- Genus: Julia
- Species: J. burni

Binomial name
- Julia burni Sarma, 1975

Species of gastropod

Julia burni is a species of a sea snail with shell of two separate hinged pieces or valves, a marine gastropod mollusk in the family Juliidae.

== Distribution ==
The type locality for this species is Port Blair in Andaman Islands, India.
