= Berthelinia australis =

Scientific classification
- Kingdom: Animalia
- Phylum: Mollusca
- Class: Gastropoda
- Superorder: Sacoglossa
- Family: Juliidae
- Genus: Berthelinia
- Species: B. australis

Binomial name
- Berthelinia australis (Burn, 1960)

Synonyms
- Midorigai australis Burn, 1960 (basionym)

Species of gastropod

Berthelinia australis is a species of a sea snail with a shell comprising two separate hinged pieces or valves. It is a marine gastropod mollusc in the family Juliidae.

== Distribution ==
The type locality for this species is Torquay, Victoria, Australia.
