= Berthelinia schlumbergeri =

Scientific classification
- Kingdom: Animalia
- Phylum: Mollusca
- Class: Gastropoda
- Superorder: Sacoglossa
- Family: Juliidae
- Genus: Berthelinia
- Species: B. schlumbergeri

Binomial name
- Berthelinia schlumbergeri Dautzenberg, 1895

Species of gastropod

Berthelinia schlumbergeri is a species of a sea snail with a shell comprising two separate hinged pieces or valves. It is a marine gastropod mollusk in the family Juliidae.

== Distribution ==
This subtropical species occurs in the western Indian Ocean, particularly South Africa. The type locality for this species is Madagascar.
