= Berthelinia pseudochloris =

Scientific classification
- Kingdom: Animalia
- Phylum: Mollusca
- Class: Gastropoda
- Superorder: Sacoglossa
- Family: Juliidae
- Genus: Berthelinia
- Species: B. pseudochloris

Binomial name
- Berthelinia pseudochloris Kay, 1964

Species of gastropod

Berthelinia pseudochloris is a species of a sea snail with a shell comprising two separate hinged pieces or valves. It is a marine gastropod mollusc in the family Juliidae.

== Distribution ==
The type locality for this species is Kauaʻi, Hawaii.

Berthelinia pseudochloris is found in Maui, Oʻahu, Kauaʻi and the French Frigate Shoals.

== Description ==
This species reaches a maximum size of 6 mm. It has a wide, transparent yellow-white shell that has a curved dorsal margin. The animal itself is green in colour with white flecks.
