= Berthelinia ganapati =

Scientific classification
- Kingdom: Animalia
- Phylum: Mollusca
- Class: Gastropoda
- Superorder: Sacoglossa
- Family: Juliidae
- Genus: Berthelinia
- Species: B. ganapati

Binomial name
- Berthelinia ganapati Sarma, 1975

Species of gastropod

Berthelinia ganapati is a species of a sea snail with a shell comprising two separate hinged pieces or valves. It is a marine gastropod mollusc in the family Juliidae.

== Distribution ==
The type locality for this species is Southeastern India.
