= Julia thecaphora =

Scientific classification
- Kingdom: Animalia
- Phylum: Mollusca
- Class: Gastropoda
- Superorder: Sacoglossa
- Family: Juliidae
- Genus: Julia
- Species: J. thecaphora

Binomial name
- Julia thecaphora (Carpenter, 1857)

Species of gastropod

Julia thecaphora is a species of a sea snail with a shell comprising two separate hinged pieces or valves. It is a marine gastropod mollusk in the family Juliidae.

== Distribution ==
The type locality for this species is probably Mazatlán, Mexico.
