= Ascobulla fischeri =

Scientific classification
- Kingdom: Animalia
- Phylum: Mollusca
- Class: Gastropoda
- Family: Volvatellidae
- Genus: Ascobulla
- Species: A. fischeri

Binomial name
- Ascobulla fischeri (A. Adams & Angas, 1864)

Synonyms
- Ascobulla pusilla (G. Nevill & H. Nevill, 1869); Cylindrobulla fischeri A. Adams & Angas, 1864 (original combination); Cylindrobulla pusilla G. Nevill & H. Nevill, 1869 ·; Cylindrobulla sculpta G. Nevill & H. Nevill, 1869

Species of gastropod

Ascobulla fischeri is a species of sea snail, a marine gastropod sacoglossan mollusk in the family Volvatellidae.

== Description ==
(Original description in Latin) The cylindrical shell is fragile and thin It is white and semitransparent. It is truncate (cut off squarely) in front and rounded behind. Posteriorly, it is radiately striate, with the striae abruptly terminating near the posterior extremity. It is otherwise very smooth. The aperture is linear in the middle, scarcely closed, and widened anteriorly.

== Distribution ==
This marine species is endemic to Australia and occurs off New South Wales, South Australia, Tasmania, Victoria and Western Australia
