= Berthelinia rottnesti =

Scientific classification
- Kingdom: Animalia
- Phylum: Mollusca
- Class: Gastropoda
- Superorder: Sacoglossa
- Family: Juliidae
- Genus: Berthelinia
- Species: B. rottnesti

Binomial name
- Berthelinia rottnesti Jensen, 1993

Species of gastropod

Berthelinia rottnesti is a species of a sea snail with a shell comprising two separate hinged pieces or valves. It is a marine gastropod mollusc in the family Juliidae.

== Distribution ==
The type locality for this species is Rottnest Island, Southwestern Australia.

== Description ==
Berthelinia rottnesti is approximately 6 mm.

== Ecology ==
This species can be found in algae and seaweed beds.
