= Berthelinia darwini =

Scientific classification
- Kingdom: Animalia
- Phylum: Mollusca
- Class: Gastropoda
- Superorder: Sacoglossa
- Family: Juliidae
- Genus: Berthelinia
- Species: B. darwini

Binomial name
- Berthelinia darwini Jensen, 1997

Species of gastropod

Berthelinia darwini is a species of a sea snail with a shell comprising two separate hinged pieces or valves. It is a marine gastropod mollusc in the family Juliidae.

== Distribution ==
This species is found in Darwin, Northern Territory of Australia. The type locality for this species is harbour in Darwin, Australia, Northern Australia.
