= Berthelinia limax =

Scientific classification
- Kingdom: Animalia
- Phylum: Mollusca
- Class: Gastropoda
- Superorder: Sacoglossa
- Family: Juliidae
- Genus: Berthelinia
- Species: B. limax

Binomial name
- Berthelinia limax (Kawaguti & Baba, 1959)

Synonyms
- Tamanovalva limax Kawaguti & Baban, 1959 (basionym)

Species of gastropod

Berthelinia limax is a species of a sea snail with a shell comprising two separate hinged pieces or valves. It is a marine gastropod mollusc in the family Juliidae.

== Distribution ==
The type locality for this species is Seto, Aichi, Japan.

Berthelinia limax is found in Pacific localities such as Japan, Australia, California, Hawaii, Jamaica in the Atlantic, and more recently in the Indian Ocean region.
