= J. japonica =

J. japonica may refer to:

- Julia japonica, a sea snail species found in Wakayama, Honshū, Japan
- Justicia japonica, a flowering plant species

== See also ==
- Japonica (disambiguation)
