= Ascobulla japonica =

Scientific classification
- Kingdom: Animalia
- Phylum: Mollusca
- Class: Gastropoda
- Family: Volvatellidae
- Genus: Ascobulla
- Species: A. japonica

Binomial name
- Ascobulla japonica (Hamatani, 1969)

Synonyms
- Cylindrobulla japonica Hamatani, 1969 (original combination)

Species of gastropod

Ascobulla japonica is a species of sea snail, a marine gastropod sacoglossan mollusk in the family Volvatellidae.

== Description ==
The length of the holotype measures 5. 7 mm, its diameter 2.5 mm.

== Distribution ==
This marine species occurs off Japan.
