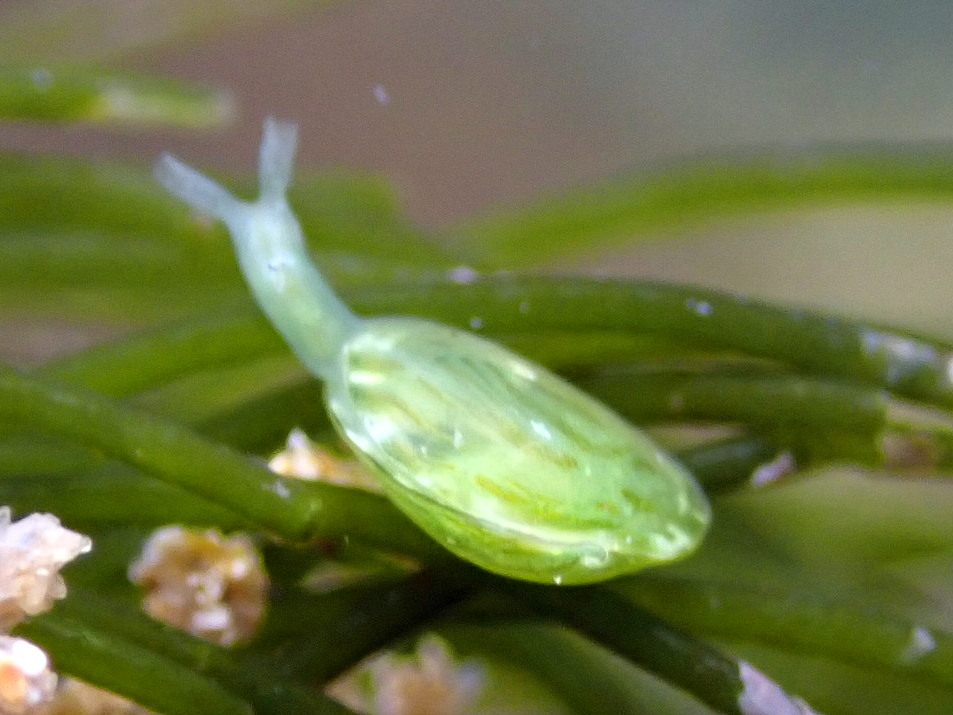

Scientific classification
- Kingdom: Animalia
- Phylum: Mollusca
- Class: Gastropoda
- Superorder: Sacoglossa
- Family: Juliidae
- Genus: Berthelinia
- Species: B. typica

Binomial name
- Berthelinia typica (Gatliff & Gabriel, 1911)

Synonyms
- Edenttellina typica Gatliff & Gabriel, 1911

= Berthelinia typica =

Species of gastropod

Berthelinia typica is a species of sea snail with a shell comprising two separate hinged pieces or valves. It is a marine gastropod mollusc in the family Juliidae. It was first described as Edentellina typica in 1911 by Gatliff and Gabriel.

== Distribution ==
The type locality for this species is Port Phillip, Victoria, Australia. However it is found in South Australia, Tasmania, and Victoria.
