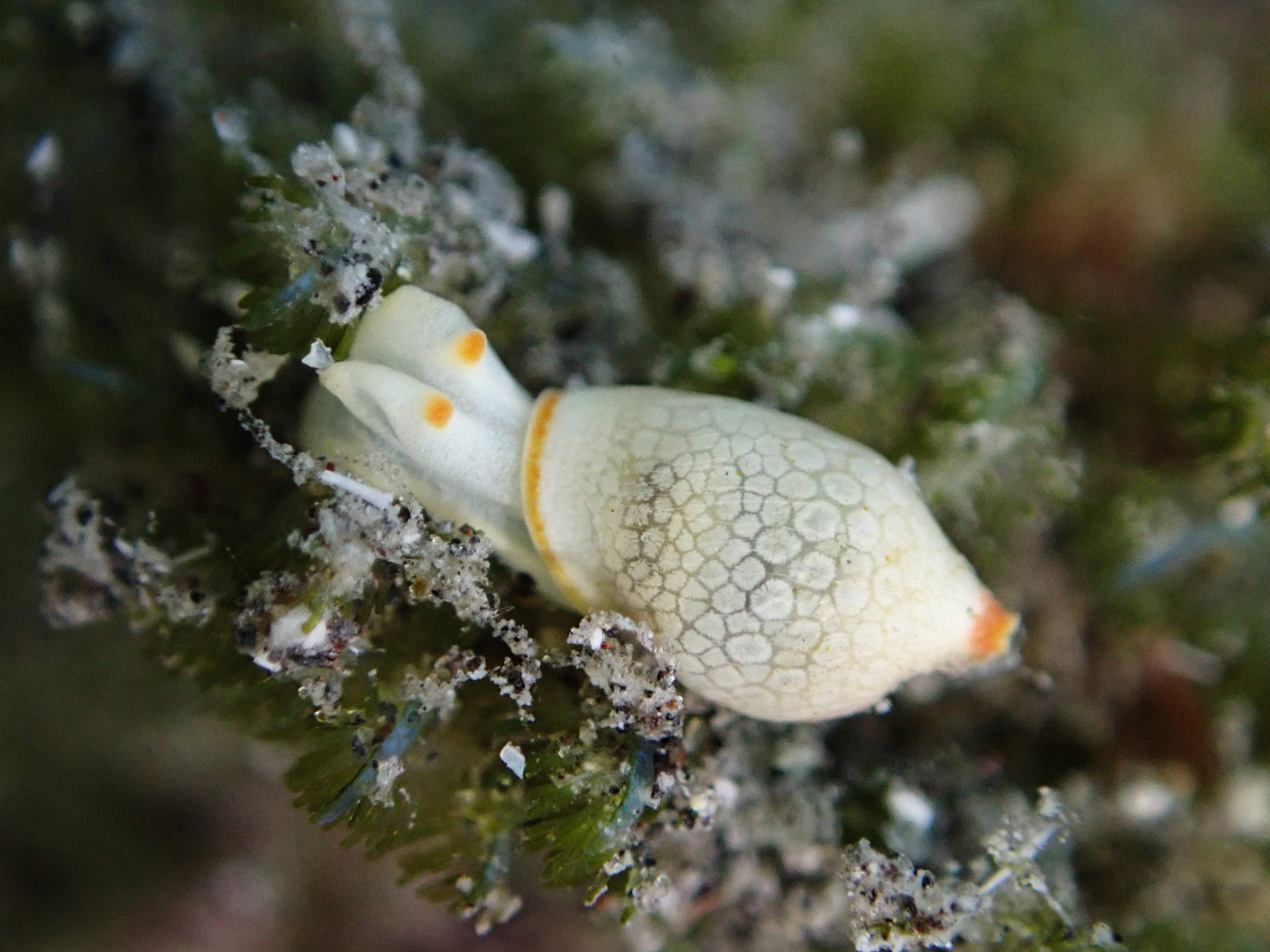
- A Volvatella angeliniana specimen in Réunion

Scientific classification
- Kingdom: Animalia
- Phylum: Mollusca
- Class: Gastropoda
- Superorder: Sacoglossa
- Family: Volvatellidae
- Genus: Volvatella
- Species: V. angeliniana

Binomial name
- Volvatella angeliniana M. Ichikawa, 1993

= Volvatella angeliniana =

Species of gastropod

Volvatella angeliniana is a marine gastropod mollusc in the family Volvatellidae. It is found in many locations in the South Pacific and West Pacific.

== Description ==
This species has a maximum shell length of about 5mm. It has a white, ovoid, translucent mantle, with numerous white patches. The head tentacles have orange tips. The posterior spout is rimmed with orange coloration. There may also be an orange-coloured band at the anterior end of the mantle. However, specimens without this anterior orange band have been found in New Caledonia. Its eyes can clearly be seen behind the base of the rhinophores.

== Distribution ==
Volvatella angeliniana has been found in many locations in the South and West Pacific, such as New Caledonia, the Ryukyu Islands, Marianas Islands, Réunion, NE Australia, the seas around Japan, and the Marshall Islands.

== Behaviour ==
This species secretes a milky substance when disturbed.
