= Anachis fayae =

Scientific classification
- Kingdom: Animalia
- Phylum: Mollusca
- Class: Gastropoda
- Subclass: Caenogastropoda
- Order: Neogastropoda
- Family: Columbellidae
- Genus: Anachis
- Species: A. fayae

Binomial name
- Anachis fayae Keen, 1971

Synonyms
- Anachis bartschii Dall, 1918, sensu Keen, 1958 misapplication

Species of gastropod

Anachis fayae is a species of sea snail in the family Columbellidae, the dove snails.

== Distribution ==
This marine species occurs off Baja California
