= Myra Keen =

American malacologist and invertebrate paleontologist

- Born: Angeline Myra Keen; May 23, 1905; Colorado Springs, Colorado
- Died: January 4, 1986 (aged 80); Santa Rosa, California
- Education: Colorado College; Stanford University; University of California, Berkeley
- Occupations: Invertebrate paleontologist; Malacologist

Angeline Myra Keen (1905–1986) was an American malacologist and invertebrate paleontologist. She was an expert on the evolution of marine mollusks with a PhD in psychology. Keen went from being a volunteer, identifying shells at Stanford, and having no formal training in biology or geology, to being one of the world's foremost malacologists. She was called the "First Lady of Malacology".

== Early life and education ==
Myra Keen was born on May 23, 1905, in Colorado Springs, Colorado, to parents Ernest Byron and Mary Thurston Keen. Prior to pursuing earth sciences, Keen intended to become a concert pianist. Deterred from entomology, she finally turned to psychology as her field of study. Keen attended Colorado College and graduated in 1930 with a degree in psychology. In 1931, shortly after she decided to continue her education, she won a fellowship to Stanford University, enabling her to complete her master's degree. Keen went on to complete her PhD in psychology, attending the University of California, Berkeley in 1934.

While studying at Berkeley, Keen became interested in seashells, which she collected during trips to Monterey in the summer. The discovery of these sea shells sparked Keen's interest in malacology, and she spent the following summer in Monterey collecting different specimens and sea shells. Struggling to find a job, Keen started volunteering at Stanford's Hopkins Marine Station, identifying seashells for the geology department and working under Ida Shepard Oldroyd. Keen was able to establish a connection with Oldroyd, who at the time was the curator of shell collections at Stanford University. The volunteer position was her first time studying mollusks, aside from previous classes in geology, biology and statistics.

== Career ==
After she received her Ph.D., Keen was unable to find a job within the field of psychology due to the major impact of The Great Depression, leaving her unemployed. However, at the same time, some seashells she bought from a curio shop in Berkeley drew her attention and she found more during a trip to Monterey. After learning that Ida Oldroyd's work at Stanford involved shells, Keen volunteered herself to be an assistant of Oldroyd. During this time, she became an informal student of a Stanford paleontologist, Hubert Schenk. According to her own description, it was this tutorship that provided her the academic guidance in paleontology she needed. Concurrently, Keen audited Schenk's geology classes that focused on paleontology and stratigraphy and collaborated on research. After four years of volunteering, Stanford hired her as the curator of paleontology. Over the course of 23 years of teaching, during which she was one of only three female science professors, she taught courses on paleontology, curatorial methods, and biological oceanography, among other subjects. In 1954 Keen became assistant professor of paleontology, followed by curator of malacology in 1957. In 1964 she was awarded a Guggenheim Fellowship.

Keen retired in 1970 as professor of paleontology emeritus and curator of malacology emeritus. She was a member of Phi Beta Kappa and a fellow at the Geological Society of America and the Paleontological Society. In 1979, she was the first woman to be given the Fellow Medal from the California Academy of Sciences. She served as chair of the Committee on Nomenclature of the Society of Systematic Zoology. She was also president of the Western Society of Malacologists and the American Malacological Union.

Myra Keen was active in publishing. She wrote nine books. A few of her most noted published books are, Abridged Check List and Bibliography of West North American Mollusca (1937), Check List of California Tertiary Marine Mollusca (1944) which she co-wrote with Herdis Bentson, Sea Shells of Tropical West America (1958), and a second edition (1971) with the assistance James H. McLean, Marine Molluscan Genera of Western North America: An Illustrated Key (1963), and a second edition (1974), coauthored with Eugene Coan. In addition, Keen wrote over seventy-five papers that were published in scholarly journals. One of the first articles she wrote was focused on her documentation of how molluscan faunas reacted to changes at different latitudes due to the gradual cooling of the sea. The study that she published on this subject was valuable to geologists for two main reasons. It helped geologists understand the temperature change of the sea in past times, as well as identifying source areas of sedimentary rocks that had moved to new positions due to continental drift.

Her research work focused around mollusk systematics, as well as marine molluscan Cenozoic paleontology, neontology and zoogeography of the western North America and marine mollusk fauna from the Panamic Province. She helped catalog, organize and collect for the Cenozoic mollusk collection at Stanford. Keen provided the first research documentation regarding how the distribution of mollusks on the Pacific coast is affected by temperature. In 1960, in the eastern Pacific Ocean, she discovered the first living examples of bivalved gastropods, which were in the species and subspecies Berthelinia chloris belvederica. Prior to this discovery, bivalved gastropods had been identified as bivalves, based on the shell characteristics.

In 1975, Keen was invited to meet with Emperor Hirohito of Japan. He was a collector of shells, and had sent Keen specimens. The two also exchanged papers. When he visited in 1975 the two met in San Francisco, where they discussed their shared interest of shells and invertebrates.

== Awards and achievements ==
In the beginning of Keen's studies, she was given a fellowship and a scholarship for her intelligence at Stanford in 1931.

Myra Keen was elected president of the American Malacological Union for 1948, and was given the Award of Honor of the American Malacological Union in 1963. Also in 1948, she helped organize the American Malacological Union—Pacific Division.

The Guggenheim Fellowship, also known as the "mid career award", is open to numerous citizens in the United States, Canada and a few other countries. Recipients are to be recognized for their great demonstrations within their preferred source of research, Keen's being Natural Sciences. Keen was awarded as a fellow in 1964.

The medal of California Academy of Sciences was awarded to Myra Keen, fellow, in 1979 for her well thought out contributions.

In 1984, Myra Keen received a citation from the College of Colorado for her personal studies in Natural Sciences and her discoveries within living mollusks and fossils. Additionally, Keen has been honored by being the namesake of 40 mollusks.

Myra Keen was actively involved in Stanford in the science faculty, which was a major achievement for women at the time since they were not recognized as being essential contributors to the advancement in the field of geology and other science departments, as it was a male dominated industry. For her historical position as one of three early female science professors, Keen is acknowledged by Stanford as being key in paving the way for women's advancements at the university. As a student and professor, she experienced sexism. She was active in the campus group, The Women of the Faculty. The group met monthly, sharing achievements and experiences. Keen served as the group's historian, and was the group's third chairman from 1958 to 1960.

== Retirement and death ==
After retirement, Myra Keen was still actively involved in the lives of her students and colleagues. Even though she could no longer continue to pursue her own career, Keen continued to review the manuscripts of her colleagues, and keep in touch with her former students. Myra began to become involved within her community, and was on the board of the Friends Association of Service for the Elderly. Keen's collection of fossils and mollusks she curated were transferred to the California Academy of Sciences, and her publications can still be found at Stanford University.

After her battle with her failing eyesight and arthritis, Myra Keen died at age 80 in Santa Rosa, California, on January 4, 1986, as a result of cancer.

== Publications ==
- Marine Molluscan Genera of Western North America; An Illustrated Key. Stanford: Stanford University Press (1974). ISBN 0-8047-0839-8
- Sea Shells of Tropical West America: Marine Mollusks from Baja California to Peru. Stanford: Stanford University Press (1971). ISBN 0-8047-0736-7
