= C. typica =

C. typica may refer to:

- Coracina typica, the Mauritius cuckooshrike, a bird species endemic to Mauritius
- Cricosaura typica, the Cuban night lizard, a lizard species found only in Cuba

== See also ==
- Typica (disambiguation)
