= Ascobulla californica =

Scientific classification
- Kingdom: Animalia
- Phylum: Mollusca
- Class: Gastropoda
- Superorder: Sacoglossa
- Family: Volvatellidae
- Genus: Ascobulla
- Species: A. californica

Binomial name
- Ascobulla californica (Hamatani, 1971)

Synonyms
- Cylindrobulla californica Hamatani, 1971 (original combination)

Species of gastropod

Ascobulla californica is a species of sea snail, a marine gastropod sacoglossan mollusk in the family Volvatellidae.

== Description ==
The length of the holotype measures 5 mm, its diameter is 2.5 mm.

== Distribution ==
This species occurs in the Gulf of California.
