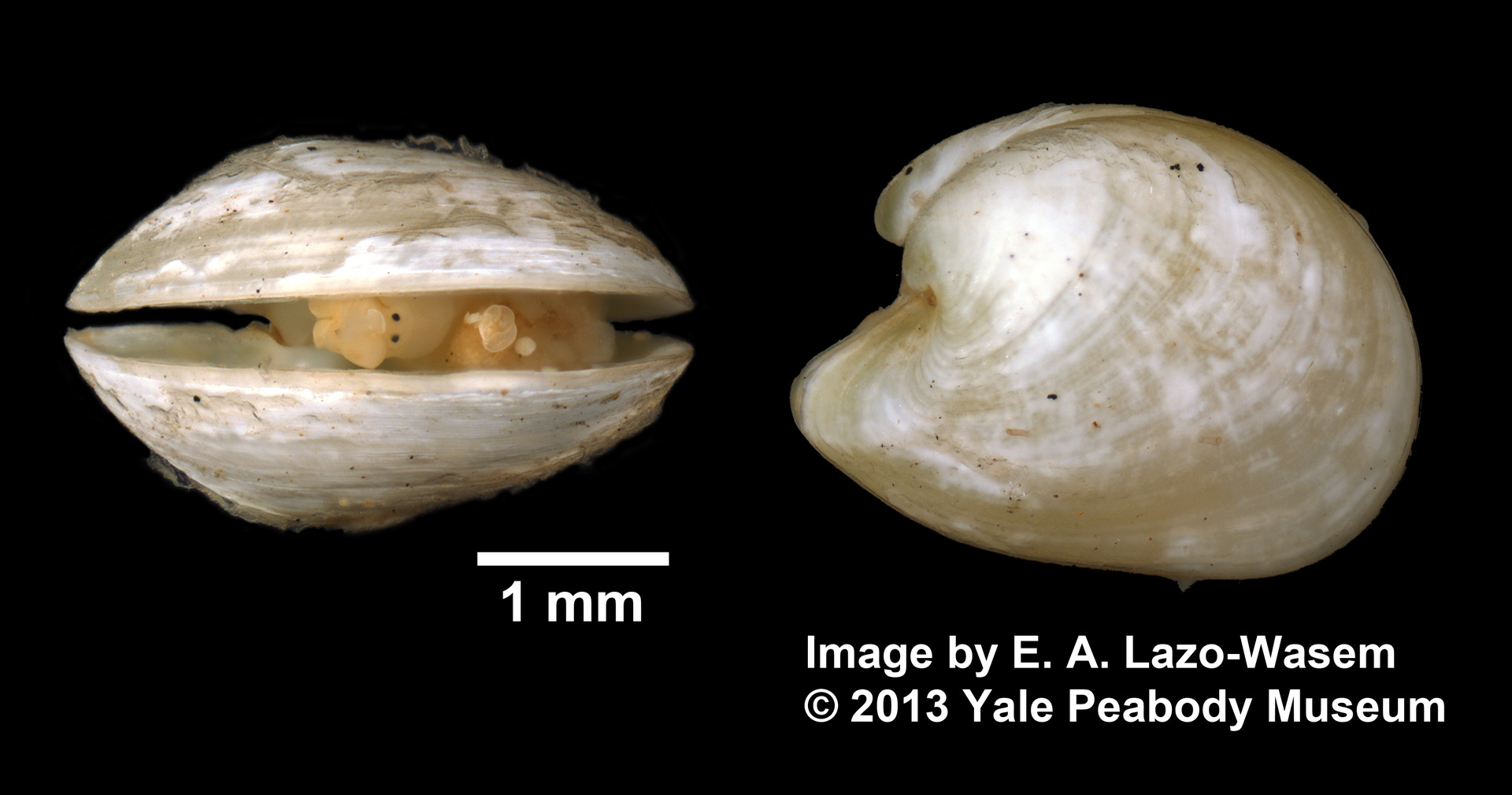

Scientific classification
- Kingdom: Animalia
- Phylum: Mollusca
- Class: Gastropoda
- Superorder: Sacoglossa
- Family: Juliidae
- Genus: Julia
- Species: J. japonica

Binomial name
- Julia japonica Kuroda & Habe, 1951

= Julia japonica =

Species of gastropod

Julia japonica is a species of a sea snail with a shell comprising two separate hinged pieces or valves. It is a marine gastropod mollusk in the family Juliidae.

== Distribution ==
The type locality for this species is Wakayama, Honshū, Japan.

== Ecology ==
It eats green alga Microdictyon japonicum.

Its shell was also found in the intestine of fish Pacific yellowtail emperor (Lethrinus atkinsoni).
