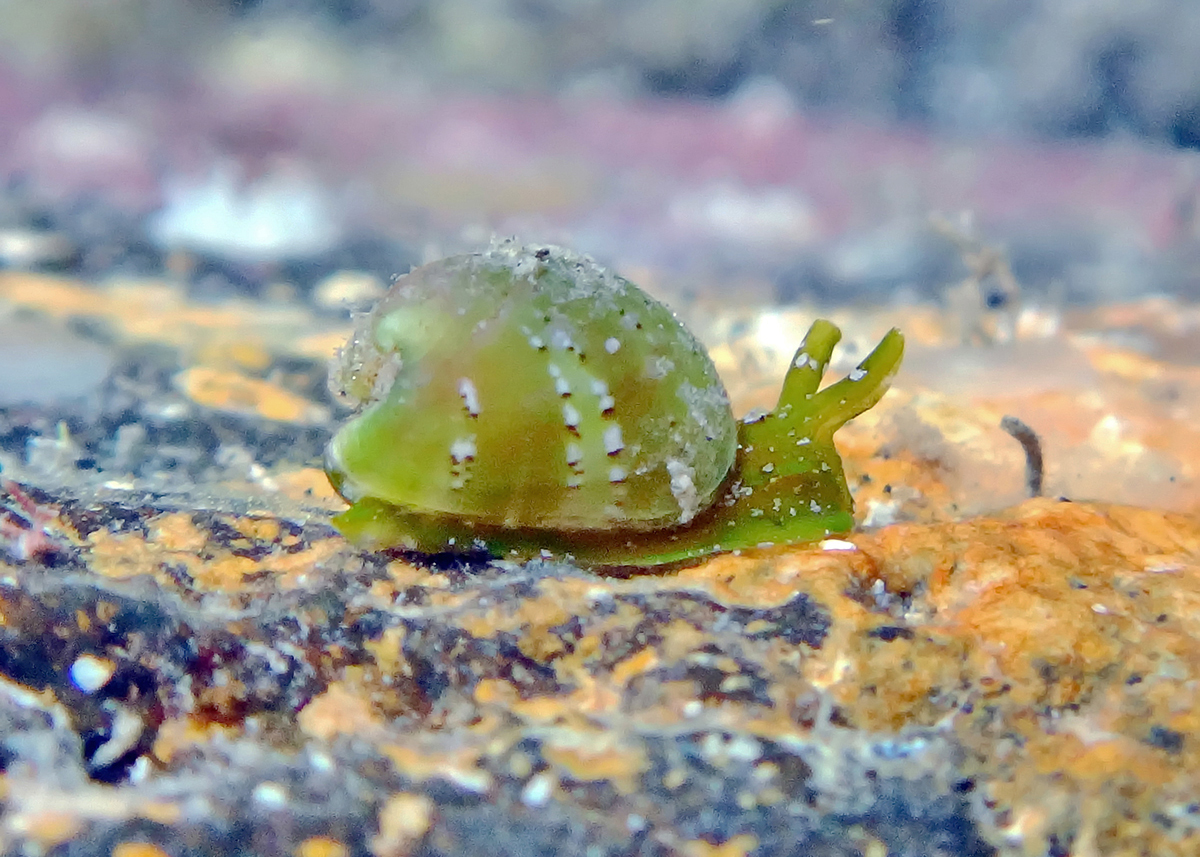
- Julia exquisita

Scientific classification
- Kingdom: Animalia
- Phylum: Mollusca
- Class: Gastropoda
- Superorder: Sacoglossa
- Family: Juliidae
- Genus: Julia
- Species: J. exquisita

Binomial name
- Julia exquisita Gould, 1862

= Julia exquisita =

Species of gastropod

Julia exquisita is a small species of sea snail in the family Juliidae. This species can be found in shallow tropical habitats throughout the Pacific, and feed on algae, in which photosynthetic cells are taken up and incorporated into the snails' body tissues for energy storage.

== Distribution ==
Julia exquisita is a benthic organism, often residing in intertidal flats. Individuals typically live at depths of about 3 meters, but have been observed at depths as low as 10 meters.

Julia exquisita prefers a warmer climate with available sunlight, meaning that their distribution is relegated to tropical Pacific waters. The species has the greatest observed abundance in the coral triangle, along the coasts of Hawaii, and in the Caribbean, but have also been found along the coast of Madagascar, Australia, and other Indo-West Pacific islands.

== Description ==
Individuals of Julia exquisita are dark green in color with a long thin body and a characteristic bivalve shell. They range from 4–6 mm in length, with a dorsal foot roughly as wide as their neck. The anterior edge of the grooved foot extends to a round oral tentacle used for feeding. Many individuals exhibit small white patches on their body which are often surrounded by brown rings.

White eye prominences lead to thin, squared rhinophores extending from the head which act as scent and taste receptors. Within the oral feeding tentacle is a radula, or sharp tooth, which is used to feed by scraping their food source.

The shell is the best defining characteristic of this species, as it is a two-parted convex dorsal shell which greatly resembles that of bivalves. The shell is bright green in color, typically with red-brown or white bands surrounding its concentric lines. Shells have a round anterior margin and are ovular in shape.

The internal anatomy of Julia exquisita is similar to that of other bivalve gastropods, with 2 shell valves surrounding a visceral mass containing their vital organs. Key anatomical differences between Julia exquisita and other similar species include proportionally larger adductor muscles, which are used to shut the two shell valves, as well as a slightly more complex penis.

== Reproduction and Development ==
Adult members of the species reproduce using internal fertilization in which male sperm fertilize female eggs which are laid and left to develop into larvae. While in ovum development, Julia exquisita experiences a trochophore stage before assuming their final larval form. Larvae take on a planktonic form after hatching, and eventually use mucous threads to settle on algae covered surfaces. Once settled, larvae undergo metamorphosis until they reach their adult life stage. Their characteristic bivalve shell is fully produced in about three days.

== Feeding and Behavior ==
Julia exquisita are opportunistic grazers. Like other similar species, individuals use their sharp radula to pierce the cells of algae and suck out the cellular contents. These contents are then digested using mucus within the digestive tract.

Their feeding habits also influence their behavior, as individuals typically tether themselves to algal colonies using mucus-like threads extending from their dorsal foot. Individuals can withdraw into their shell while still being tethered, allowing them to protect themselves from predation while staying attached to their food source.

Like other members of the Juliidae family, Julia exquisita performs kleptoplasty in which functional contents of the algal cells are incorporated into their bodies. Specifically, chloroplasts from the algae are kept photosynthetically functional within the digestive gland. This allows Julia exquisita to continue to use the energy produced through algal photosynthesis, while also contributing to the green color characteristic of this species.
