= Cylindrobulla gigas =

Scientific classification
- Kingdom: Animalia
- Phylum: Mollusca
- Class: Gastropoda
- Superorder: Sacoglossa
- Family: Cylindrobullidae
- Genus: Cylindrobulla
- Species: C. gigas

Binomial name
- Cylindrobulla gigas Mikkelsen, 1998

Species of gastropod

Cylindrobulla gigas is a species of sea snail, a marine gastropod mollusc in the family Cylindrobullidae.

== Distribution ==
- Florida, the Caribbean and Bermuda

== Description ==
The maximum recorded shell length is 17.5 mm.

== Habitat ==
Minimum recorded depth is 0.5 m. Maximum recorded depth is 18 m.
