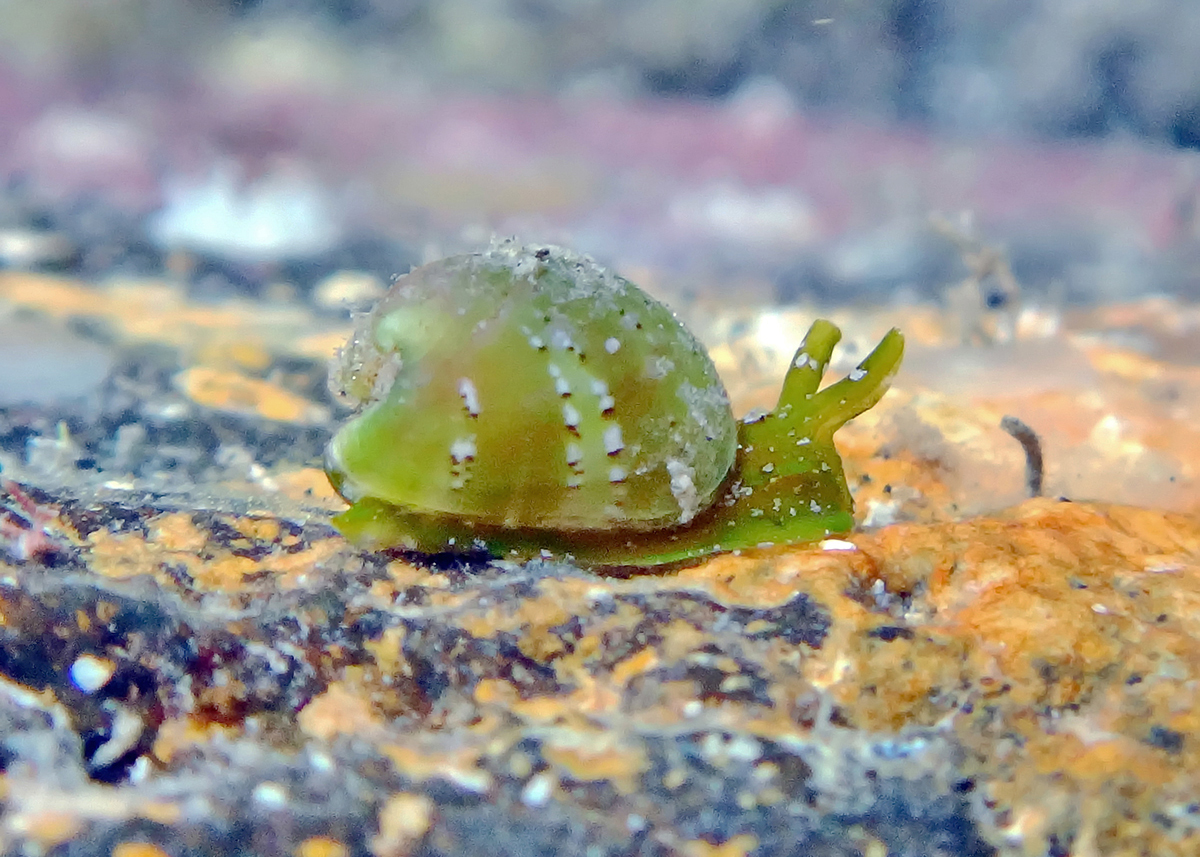
- Julia exquisita

Scientific classification
- Kingdom: Animalia
- Phylum: Mollusca
- Class: Gastropoda
- Superorder: Sacoglossa
- Family: Juliidae
- Genus: Julia; Gould, 1862

Species
- See text.

Synonyms
- Prasina Deshayes, 1863

= Julia (gastropod) =

Genus of gastropods

Julia is a genus of minute sea snails, marine gastropod mollusks or micromollusks in the superfamily Oxynooidea.

Julia is the type genus of the family Juliidae.

== Description ==
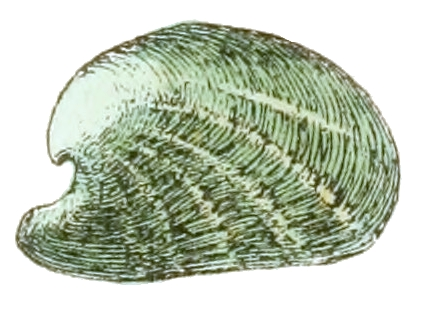
Drawing of the shell (the exterior of the right valve) of taxon named Julia borbonica

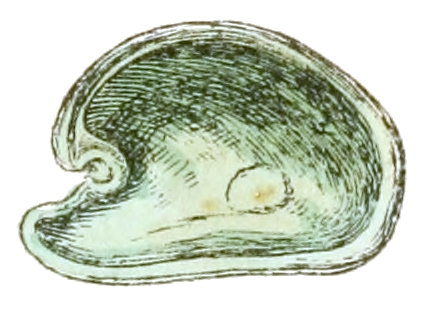
Drawing of the interior of the left valve of the shell of "Julia borbonica".

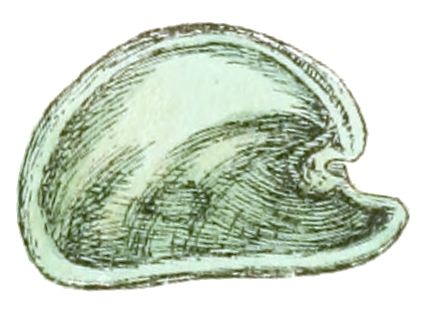
Drawing of the interior of the right valve of the shell of "Julia borbonica".

As Tryon (1884) wrote in his description of the genus Julia: the shell is oblong, thick, and cordiform. The valves are closed, the margins entire and the valves are inequilateral. The lunule is deep circular, projecting into the interior of the right valve, the left valve is in the same place furnished with dentiform tubercles. The hinge line is simple and arched. The ligament is external and narrow. There are two muscle scars which are unequal and subcentral.

These animals have two valves, and the soft parts can be completely withdrawn inside the shell. The two valves are usually thin and translucent.

The empty valves of the shells of these animals are in some cases green, in other cases brownish-green or yellow, and in yet others, colorless. The species Julia zebra has shells that are finely striped with brown and blotched with white.

=== Species ===
- (recent) Julia burni Sarma, 1975
- (invalid recent species) Julia cornuta (De Folin, 1867)
- (invalid recent species) Julia equatorialis Pilsbry & Olsson, 1944
- (recent) Julia exquisita Gould, 1862 - this species was mentioned in report by the Challenger expedition
- (recent) Julia japonica Kuroda & Habe, 1951
- (recent) Julia mishimaensis Kawaguti & Yamasu, 1982
- (recent) Julia thecaphora (Carpenter, 1857) - a probable synonym is Julia zebra Kawaguti, 1981
- (recent) Julia zebra Kawaguti 1981
