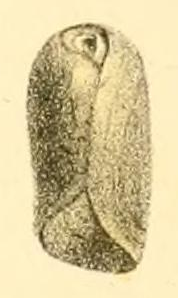
- drawing of the shell of Cylindrobulla beauii from its original description by Paul Henri Fischer (1857)

Scientific classification
- Kingdom: Animalia
- Phylum: Mollusca
- Class: Gastropoda
- Superorder: Sacoglossa
- Family: Cylindrobullidae
- Genus: Cylindrobulla
- Species: C. beauii

Binomial name
- Cylindrobulla beauii P. Fischer, 1857

= Cylindrobulla beauii =

Species of gastropod

Cylindrobulla beauii is a species of sea snail, a marine gastropod mollusc in the family Cylindrobullidae.

Cylindrobulla beauii is the type species of the genus Cylindrobulla.

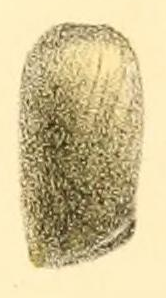
Drawing of the shell of Cylindrobulla beauii from its original description by Paul Henri Fischer (1857).

== Description ==
The maximum recorded shell length is 13.6 mm.

== Habitat ==
Minimum recorded depth is 0 m. Maximum recorded depth is 40 m.
