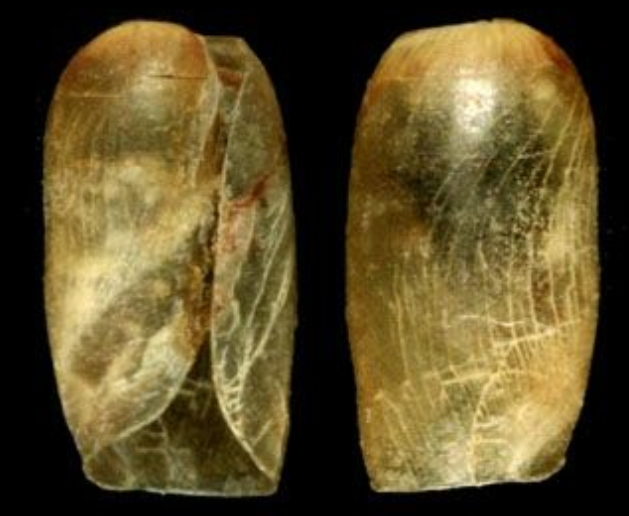
- Shell of Ascobulla fragilis (specimen in the Natural History Museum Rotterdam)

Scientific classification
- Kingdom: Animalia
- Phylum: Mollusca
- Class: Gastropoda
- Family: Volvatellidae
- Genus: Ascobulla
- Species: A. fragilis

Binomial name
- Ascobulla fragilis (Jeffreys, 1856)

Synonyms
- Cylichna fragilis Jeffreys, 1856; Cylindrobulla fragilis

= Ascobulla fragilis =

Species of gastropod

Ascobulla fragilis is a species of sea snail, a marine gastropod sacoglossan mollusk in the family Volvatellidae.

The complete nucleotide sequence of the mitochondrial genome of Ascobulla fragilis has been available since 2008.

Gavagnin et al. (1994) placed this species accidentally and erroneously in a different genus.

== Description ==
(Original description in Latin) The shell is cylindrical, very shiny and hyaline (glassy/transparent). It is constricted towards the apex and longitudinally finely striate there, but otherwise it is very smooth. The spire is loosely coiled. The apex is scarcely conspicuous and is obliquely attenuated. The aperture is narrow superiorly, dilated below, and truncate (cut off squarely). ref name="Jeffreys 1856" />

== Distribution ==
The type locality is La Spezia, Italy.. The species occurs broadly in the Mediterranean Sea and off the Canary Islands.
