= Berthelinia chloris =

Scientific classification
- Kingdom: Animalia
- Phylum: Mollusca
- Class: Gastropoda
- Superorder: Sacoglossa
- Family: Juliidae
- Genus: Berthelinia
- Species: B. chloris

Binomial name
- Berthelinia chloris (Dall, 1918)

Synonyms
- Berthelinia chloris belvederica Keen & Smith, 1961; Scintilla chloris Dall, 1918 (basionym)

Species of gastropod

Berthelinia chloris, also known as the green sapsucker, is a species of sea snail with a shell comprising two separate hinged pieces or valves. It is a marine gastropod mollusc in the family Juliidae.

== Distribution ==
This species is found in the eastern Pacific. The type locality for this species is Baja California, Western Mexico.
