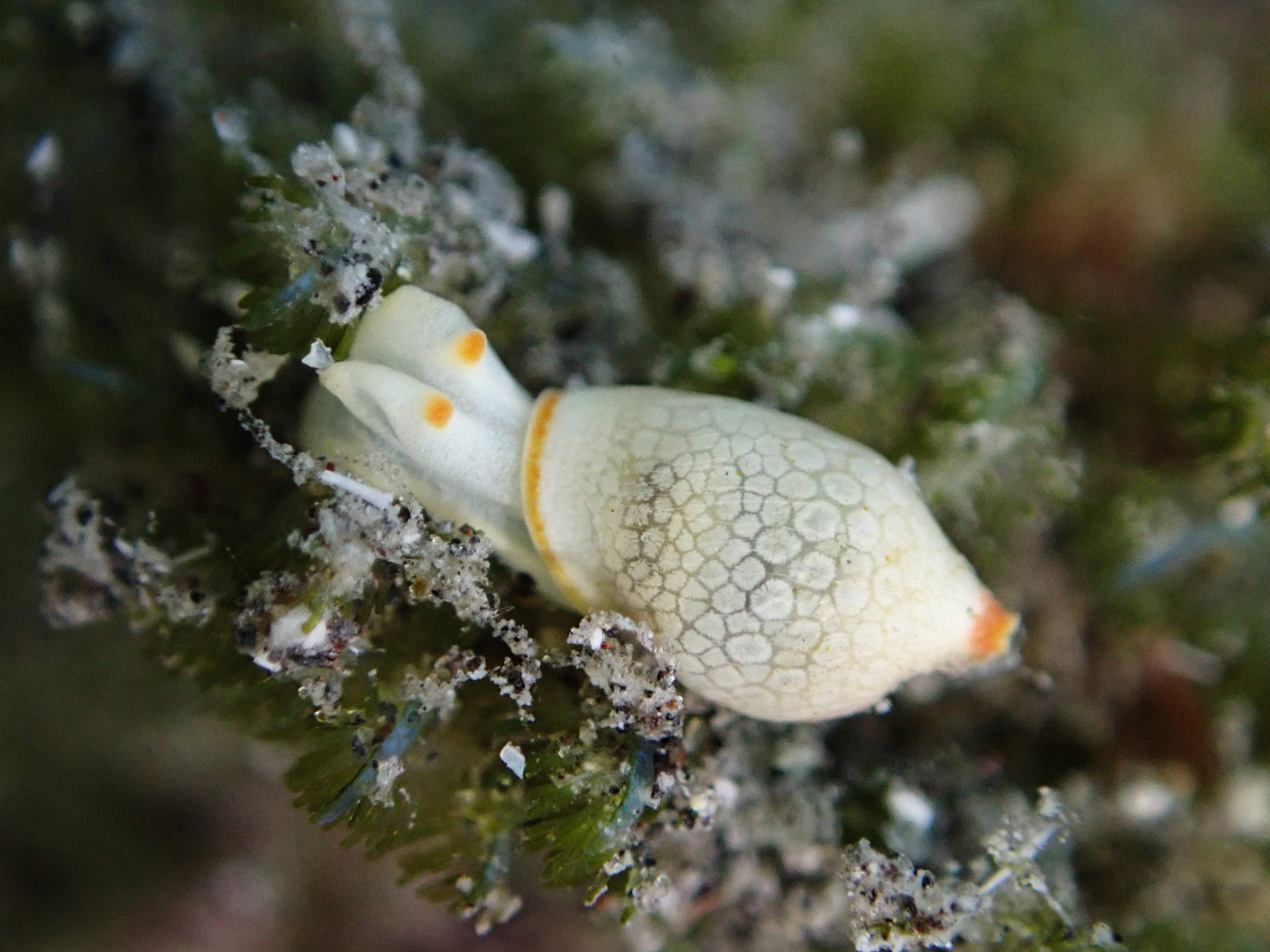
- Volvatella angeliniana

Scientific classification
- Kingdom: Animalia
- Phylum: Mollusca
- Class: Gastropoda
- Family: Volvatellidae
- Genus: Volvatella; Pease, 1860

Type species
- Volvatella fragilis Pease, 1860

Species
- See text

Synonyms
- Arthessa Evans, 1950

= Volvatella =

Genus of gastropods

Volvatella is a genus of sea snails, bubble snails, a marine gastropod sacoglossan mollusk in the family Volvatellidae.

== Species ==
Species within the genus Volvatella include:

- Volvatella angeliniana Ichikawa, 1993
- Volvatella australis Jensen, 1997
- Volvatella ayakii Hamatani, 1972
- Volvatella bermudae K.B. Clark, 1982
- Volvatella candida Pease, 1868
- Volvatella cincta G. Nevill & H. Nevill, 1869
- Volvatella elioti (Evans, 1950)
- Volvatella evansi (Kay, 1961)
- Volvatella faviae Á. Valdés & Lozouet, 2000 †
- Volvatella ficula Burn, 1966
- Volvatella fragilis Pease, 1860
- Volvatella kawamurai Habe, 1946
- Volvatella laguncula G.B. Sowerby III, 1894
- Volvatella maculata K. R. Jensen, 2015
- Volvatella omega (Melvill, 1918)
- Volvatella pyriformis Pease, 1868
- Volvatella ventricosa Jensen & Wells, 1990
- Volvatella vigourouxi (Montrouzier, 1861)
- Volvatella viridis Hamatani, 1976
