= Berthelinia =

Scientific classification
- Kingdom: Animalia
- Phylum: Mollusca
- Class: Gastropoda
- Superorder: Sacoglossa
- Superfamily: Oxynooidea
- Family: Juliidae
- Genus: Berthelinia; Crosse, 1875

Type species
- † Berthelinia elegans Crosse, 1875

Synonyms
- † Berthelinia (Anomalomya) Cossmann, 1887 accepted, alternate representation; † Berthelinia (Squamulinia) Le Renard, 1989 accepted, alternate representation; Berthelinia (Tamanovalva) Kawaguti & Baba, 1959; Edenttellina Gatliff & Gabriel, 1911; Midorigai Burn, 1960; Tamanovalva Kawaguti & Baba, 1959

Genus of molluscs

Berthelinia is a genus of gastropod belonging to the family Juliidae.

The genus has almost cosmopolitan distribution.

Species:

- Berthelinia australis (Burn, 1960)
- Berthelinia babai (Burn, 1965)
- Berthelinia caribbea Edmunds, 1963
- Berthelinia chloris (Dall, 1918)
- Berthelinia corallensis (Hedley, 1920)
- Berthelinia darwini Jensen, 1997
- Berthelinia elegans Crosse, 1875
- Berthelinia fijiensis (Burn, 1966)
- Berthelinia ganapati Sarma, 1975
- Berthelinia limax (Kawaguti & Baba, 1959)
- † Berthelinia oligocaenica Janssen, 1979
- Berthelinia pseudochloris Kay, 1964
- Berthelinia rottnesti Jensen, 1993
- Berthelinia schlumbergeri Dautzenberg, 1895
- Berthelinia singaporensis K.Jensen, 2015
- Berthelinia typica (Gatliff & Gabriel, 1911)
- Berthelinia waltairensis Sarma, 1975
