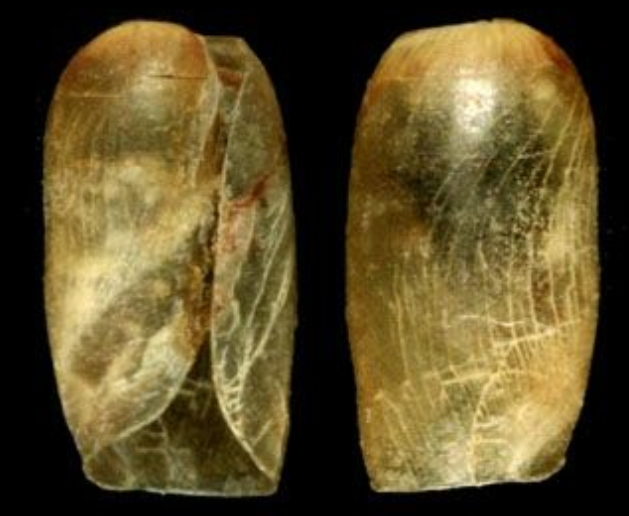
- Shell of Ascobulla fragilis

Scientific classification
- Kingdom: Animalia
- Phylum: Mollusca
- Class: Gastropoda
- Superorder: Sacoglossa
- Family: Volvatellidae
- Genus: Ascobulla; Ev. Marcus, 1972

Type species
- Cylindrobulla ulla Er. Marcus & Ev. Marcus, 1970

= Ascobulla =

Genus of sea snails

== Introduction ==
Ascobulla is a genus of sea snails, a marine gastropod shelled-sacoglossan mollusk in the family Volvatellidae. A more common term for the organism is “bubble snails.” The description of “bubble-shells'' comes from the shape of the head-shield and large external shell. There are three shelled-sacoglossans: Cylindrobulla, Ascobulla, and Volvatella. These three oxynoacean are the most primitive living members of the gastropod order Sacoglossa. Much confusion has occurred in the exact classifications between these species, and living animals of Cylindrobulla and Ascobulla have often been considered to be essentially identical, but more recent research is geared towards distinguishing between the two. Several unambiguous features have been found to clearly distinguish the two: These are the cephalic shield with a shallow furrow found in Cylindrobulla, the broad tooth shape of Cylindrobulla, the number of more than 50 teeth in Cylindrobulla, and the equal length of the radula limbs in Cylindrobulla. To date, the genus Ascobulla contains 5 species: A. californica, A. fischeri, A. fragilis, A. japonica, and A. ulla.

== Species ==
- Ascobulla californica (Hamatani, 1971)
- Ascobulla fischeri (A. Adams & Angas, 1864)
- Ascobulla fragilis (Jeffreys, 1856)
- Ascobulla japonica (Hamatani, 1969)
- Ascobulla ulla (Er. Marcus & Ev. Marcus, 1970)

Synonyms

- Ascobulla pusilla (G. Nevill & H. Nevill, 1869): synonym of Ascobulla fischeri (A. Adams & Angas, 1864)
- Ascobulla souverbiei (Montrouzier, 1874): synonym of Cylindrobulla souverbiei (Montrouzier, 1874)

== Distribution ==
Ascobulla appears to show a global distribution in tropical and subtropical waters. Caribbean (Caribbean coasts of Mexico in mangrove habitats), Mediterranean. One species within the Ascobulla genus that has received focus in research is Ascobulla fragilis. This snail inhabits the warmer areas of the Mediterranean Sea. It is also found in the waters near the Cape of Good Hope in South Africa.

== Physical description ==
Ascobulla exhibits a cylindrical, often somewhat pear-shaped shell with a concave apex and the protoconch (the embryonic/larval shell) exposed at the center. The shell itself is fairly thin and lightly calcified. It exhibits a sutural slit and a sharp edged sutural keel. Ascobulla has a cephalic shield, which is a hard external covering. They have a uniserial radula with dagger-shaped teeth, and the preradular tooth present These snails have a foot that is relatively short (never extends beyond the shell), even when extended; the head and foot of the snail may be completely withdrawn back into the shell, and the shell then may be contracted by an anterior adductor muscle. The eyes of Ascobulla are located laterally, underneath the cephalic lobes. The gill of all shelled Sacoglossa is composed of a series of many parallel, ciliated lamellae, which are folds of the outer tissue layers of the mantle roof and cover the surface of the kidney.

Images from Mikkelsen, 1997:

1. Ascobulla shell (4.0 mm length)
2. Ascobulla shell, expanded (3.1 mm length)
3. Apex of specimen in Image B
4. Radula (toothed feeding structure) of specimen in Image B

== Feeding ==
Ascobulla species feed suctorially on species of the siphonalean green alga, Caulerpa. Ascobulla is often found to be protected by living near Caulerpa species, and is able to reduce the toxicity that comes from these algae in order to protect itself. “Suctorial” refers to the adaptation for sucking, or drawing up fluids and nutrients. In this sense, it behaves as a parasitic organism. Ascobulla, as well as all other sacoglossan species, have a distinctive, lengthened (preradular) tooth that coexists with an ascus (The ascus is a special sac-like structure that is used by slugs to store old teeth). This tooth is well-adapted for piercing and suckling. This tooth breaks through into the cytoplasmic fluid of the algae, which is suckled out by the organism. Members of the Ascobulla all have increasing tooth size in their newest teeth, which is another characteristic that distinguishes them from Cylindrobulla.

== Reproduction ==
Ascobulla are hermaphroditic organisms, meaning they contain both male and female reproductive organs. Ascobulla features a penial stylet, which is able to be turned inside out and is located laterally on the right side. The penis itself is relatively large and muscular, so that it is capable of great extension. Only the tip of the penis is actually inserted during copulation. Copulation occurs at the female genital papilla, which is a region that contains the oviducal opening.
