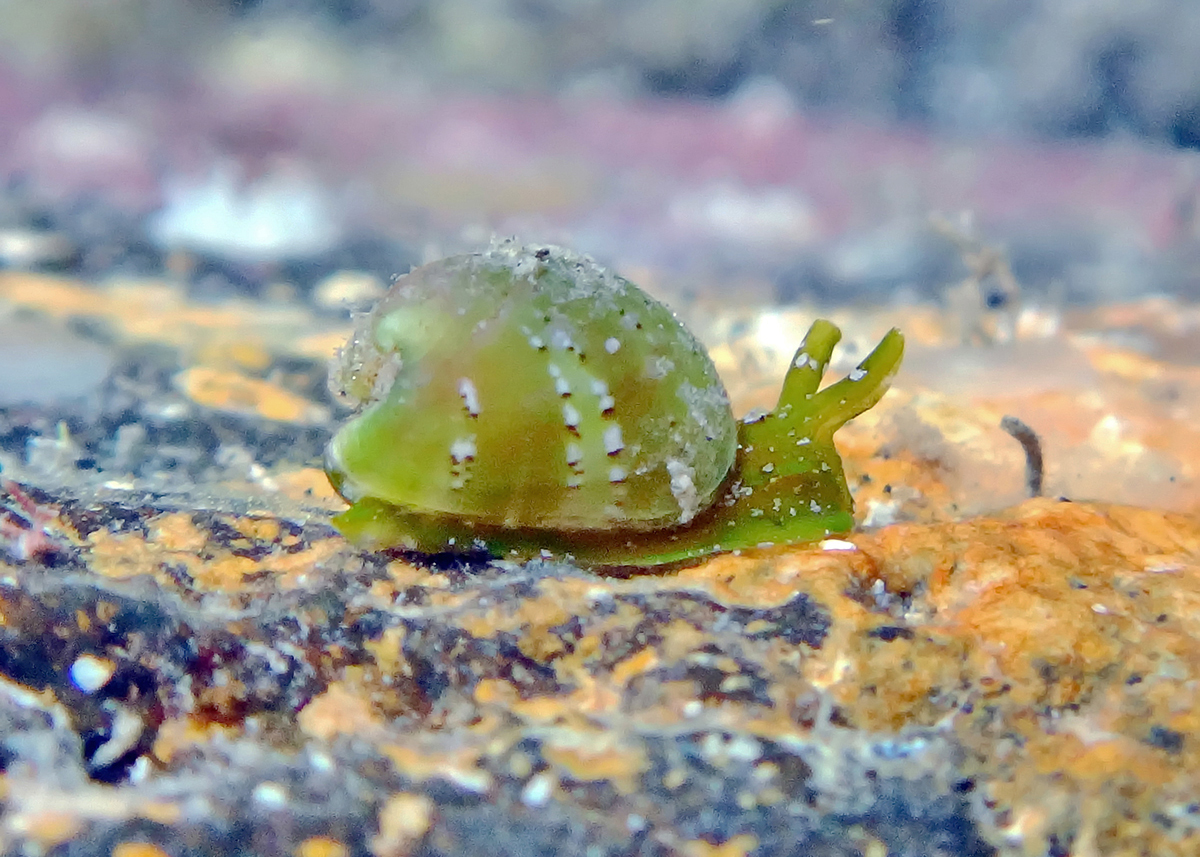
- Julia exquisita
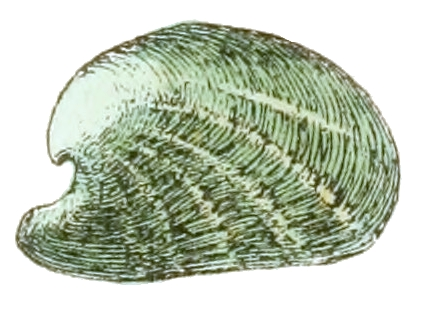
- A drawing of the shell (the exterior of the right valve) of a taxon named "Julia borbonica"

Scientific classification
- Kingdom: Animalia
- Phylum: Mollusca
- Class: Gastropoda
- Subterclass: Tectipleura
- Superorder: Sacoglossa
- Superfamily: Oxynooidea
- Family: Juliidae; E. A. Smith, 1885

Synonyms
- Prasinidae Stoliczka, 1871 (Prasinidae is a senior, but unused, synonym of Juliidae)

= Juliidae =

Juliidae Temporal range: Paleocene?/Eocene–recent

Family of gastropods

Juliidae, common name the bivalved gastropods, is a family of small sea snails, marine gastropod mollusks or micromollusks in the superfamily Oxynooidea, an opisthobranch group. These are sacoglossan (sap-sucking) sea snails, and many of them are green in color. These snails are extremely unusual in that their shells consist of two separate hinged pieces or valves. The valves are joined by a ligament, and look nothing like a normal snail shell; instead the valves look almost exactly like the two hinged valves of a clam, a bivalve mollusk, which is a related but distinct class of mollusks.

Up until the mid-20th century, the Juliidae were known only from fossil shells that were interpreted as being the shells of bivalves. Julia, which is the type genus of the family, was named in 1862 by Augustus Addison Gould, who described it as a bivalve genus. Juliidae are known from the Eocene period to the Recent, but they probably first appeared during the Paleocene.

The similarity of the bivalved (Note: ”Bivalved” refers to the shape of the shell, whilst “bivalve” refers to the animals of Bivalvia) shells of Juliidae to those of bivalves does not mean that these snails are closely related to bivalves; this is an example of convergent evolution.

== Nomenclature ==
Juliidae was named by Edgar Albert Smith in 1885. The type genus is Julia, named by Augustus Addison Gould in 1862. The family name Prasinidae was proposed earlier, by Stoliczka in 1871, but because Prasina is a junior synonym of Julia and use of Juliidae has become widely accepted, Juliidae is the correct name according to article 40.2 of the International Code of Zoological Nomenclature.

== Research history ==
=== Initial interpretation as bivalves ===
These bivalved gastropods were for a long time only known from fossils and dead material. Because of this, they had been described as being somewhat atypical bivalves. In the late 19th century they were classified among the bivalves, within the family Mytilidae, the mussels.

Julia was named by Augustus Addison Gould in 1862. He considered it a bivalve with similarities to Vulsella, Pedum, and Veneridae, but noted that it was difficult to classify due to its distinctiveness. Another genus that would later be identified as a juliid, Berthelinia, was named by H. Crosse based on a fossil in 1875. Crosse initially only had a single valve to study, and thus was unaware of its bivalved nature, and identified it as a gastropod similar to Hipponix. In 1887, with more material at hand, Crosse and Fischer realized that Berthelinia had a bivalved shell and accordingly reclassified it as a bivalve. Two shells of Julia were obtained during the Challenger expedition, and in Edgar Albert Smith's 1885 review of the bivalves collected from the expedition, he named the family Juliidae for the genus, noting that its systematic position was not yet determined.

In 1951, Arthur Day Howard reported a freshly dead shell found while washing green algae, and predicted the live animal would be found attached to green algae.

=== Discovery of live animals ===
Until the mid-20th century, these creatures were still considered to be bivalves. Then, in 1959, living individuals of one species were collected on the green alga, Caulerpa, in Japan. It was immediately clear that these animals were, in fact, unusual gastropods with a two-part shell. The first-discovered live species of bivalved gastropod was Tamanovalva limax, described by Kawaguti & Baba (1959).

Once the habitat, appearance, and life habits of these very small and inconspicuous animals were understood, researchers in subsequent years were able to find a number of other species and genera in different parts of the world, also living on various species of Caulerpa.

== Description ==
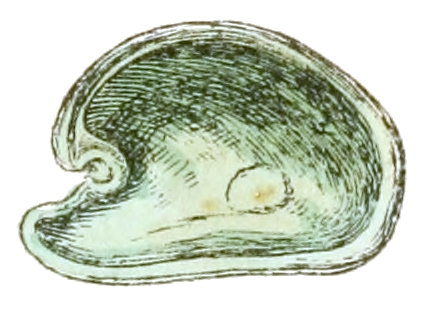
Drawing of the interior of the left valve of the shell of "Julia borbonica".

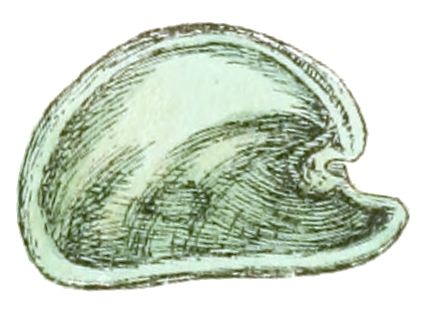
Drawing of the interior of the right valve of the shell of "Julia borbonica".

As Tryon (1884) wrote in his description of the genus Julia: the shell is oblong, thick, and cordiform. The valves are closed, the margins entire and the valves are inequilateral. The lunule is deep circular, projecting into the interior of the right valve, the left valve is in the same place furnished with dentiform tubercles. The hinge line is simple and arched. The ligament is external and narrow. There are two muscle scars which are unequal and subcentral.

These animals have two valves, and the soft parts can be completely withdrawn inside the shell. The two valves are usually thin and translucent.

In the genus Tamanovalva there is a protoconch on the apex of the left valve. This is clearly visible in the left valve of Tamanovalva babai.

The body of the live animals is in most cases green (as it is in many sacoglossans), and in many species the individual appears green in totality. This, combined with the very small overall size, makes the animal hard to see on the green algae on which it lives. This ability serves as crypsis, especially as cryptic coloration (camouflage). In two species and the camouflage is even more complete: the mantle of the animal is patterned in a way that closely resembles the structure of the alga on which it lives.

The empty valves of the shells of these animals are in some cases green, in other cases brownish-green or yellow, and in yet others, colorless. The species Julia zebra has shells that are finely striped with brown and blotched with white.

== Ecology ==
=== Distribution ===
Species in this family occur in all tropical zone seas and all temperate zone seas.

=== Life cycle ===
After hatching, the juvenile snails immediately take their place on algae (the larval phase of veliger is extremely short).

=== Feeding habits ===
Juliidae feed on green algae of the genus Caulerpa. Some species of Juliidae feed only on one species of Caulerpa; others feed on multiple species of this green alga.

== 2005 taxonomy ==
This family is within the superorder Sacoglossa (according to the taxonomy of the Gastropoda by Bouchet & Rocroi, 2005).

The family Juliidae consists of the following subfamilies (according to the taxonomy of the Gastropoda by Bouchet & Rocroi, 2005):

- subfamily Juliinae E. A. Smith, 1885 - synonym: Prasinidae Stoliczka, 1871
- subfamily Bertheliniinae Keen & A. G. Smith, 1961 - synonym: Tamanovalvidae Kawaguti & Baba, 1959
- † (fossil) subfamily Gougerotiinae Le Renard, 1980

== Genera ==
The type genus of the family Juliidae is Julia Gould, 1862.

Based on a classification by Jensen (1996), three recent genera were recognized in the family Juliidae: Julia Gould, 1862; Berthelinia Crosse, 1875; Tamanovalva Kawaguti & Baba, 1959.

While Jensen (2007) recognized two recent genera with a few subgenera in the genus Berthelinia. Recent species listed here are based on Jensen (2007), fossil genera and species are based on Le Renard (1996):

=== Juliinae ===
- Julia Gould, 1862 - synonym: Prasina Deshayes, 1863
  - (recent) Julia burni Sarma, 1975
  - (invalid recent species) Julia cornuta (De Folin, 1867)
  - (invalid recent species) Julia equatorialis Pilsbry & Olsson, 1944
  - (recent) Julia exquisita Gould, 1862 - this species was mentioned in report by the Challenger expedition
  - (recent) Julia japonica Kuroda & Habe, 1951
  - (recent) Julia mishimaensis Kawaguti & Yamasu, 1982
  - (recent) Julia thecaphora (Carpenter, 1857) - a probable synonym is Julia zebra Kawaguti, 1981
  - (recent) Julia zebra Kawaguti 1981
- (fossil) Candinia Le Renard J., Sabelli B. & Taviani M. 1996
  - (fossil) Candinia pliocaenica Le Renard J., Sabelli B. & Taviani M. 1996 - from lower Pliocene near Siena in Italy.
  - (fossil) Candinia krachi (Baluk & Jakubowski, 1968) - synonym: Berthelinia krachi Baluk & Jakubowski, 1968

=== Bertheliniinae ===
- Berthelinia Crosse, 1875 - type genus of the subfamily Bertheliniinae
  - subgenus Berthelinia Crosse, 1875
    - (recent) Berthelinia caribbea Edmunds, 1963
    - (recent) Berthelinia chloris (Dall, 1918)
    - (invalid recent species) Berthelinia corallensis Hedley, 1920
    - (recent) Berthelinia darwini Jensen, 1997
    - (recent) Berthelinia ganapati Sarma, 1975
    - (recent) Berthelinia pseudochloris Kay, 1964
    - (recent) Berthelinia rottnesti Jensen, 1993
    - (recent) Berthelinia schlumbergeri Dautzenberg, 1895
    - (recent) Berthelinia waltairensis Sarma, 1975
    - (fossil) Berthelinia elegans Crosse, 1875
  - subgenus Midorigai : synonym of Berthelinia Crosse, 1875
    - (recent) Berthelinia australis (Burn, 1960) - synonym: Midorigai australis Burn, 1960
  - subgenus Tamanovalva Kawaguti & Baba, 1959 : synonym of Berthelinia Crosse, 1875
    - (recent) Berthelinia babai (Burn, 1965) - synonym: Tamanovalva babai Burn, 1965
    - (recent) Berthelinia fijiensis (Burn, 1966)
    - (recent) Berthelinia limax (Kawaguti & Baba, 1959) - synonym: Tamanovalva limax Kawaguti & Baba, 1959 - a type species of the subgenus Tamanovalva
  - subgenus Edenttellina : synonym of Berthelinia Crosse, 1875
    - (recent) Berthelinia typica (Gatliff & Gabriel, 1911) - synonym: Edenttellina typica Gatliff & Gabriel, 1911
- (fossil?) Anomalomya Cossmann, 1887
- (fossil?) Namnetia Cossmann, 1906
- (fossil?) Squamulinia Le Renard, 1989

=== Gougerotiinae ===
- (fossil) Gougerotia Le Renard, 1980 - type genus of the subfamily Gougerotiinae
  - (fossil) Gougerotia orthodonta Le Renard, 1980

? subfamily

- (fossil) Hemiplicatula Deshayes, 1861
- (fossil?) Saintia de Raincourt, 1877

== Evolutionary history ==
The earliest known fossils of Juliidae date to the Eocene, though the group may have originated earlier, in the Paleocene. The earliest-appearing genera are Berthelinia, Gougerotia, Hemiplicatula, and Saintia, which are known from the Ypresian age (56–48.07 million years ago) of the Paris Basin. Julia itself first appears in the Oligocene.

== See also ==
- Valve (mollusc)
