= Ballognatha =

Scientific classification
- Kingdom: Animalia
- Phylum: Arthropoda
- Subphylum: Chelicerata
- Class: Arachnida
- Order: Araneae
- Infraorder: Araneomorphae
- Family: Salticidae
- Genus: Ballognatha; Caporiacco, 1935, nomen dubium
- Species: B. typica

Binomial name
- Ballognatha typica Caporiacco, 1935, nomen dubium

Genus of spiders

Ballognatha is a spider genus of the jumping spider family, Salticidae, with the single species B. typica. It occurs in Karakorum.

The species and genus were described based on a single immature and misclassified specimen. It is highly likely that there exists no real species with characters fitting the original description. Genus and species are thus a nomen dubium.

== Name ==
The genus name is a combination of the related salticid genus Ballus and Ancient Greek gnath- "jaw".
