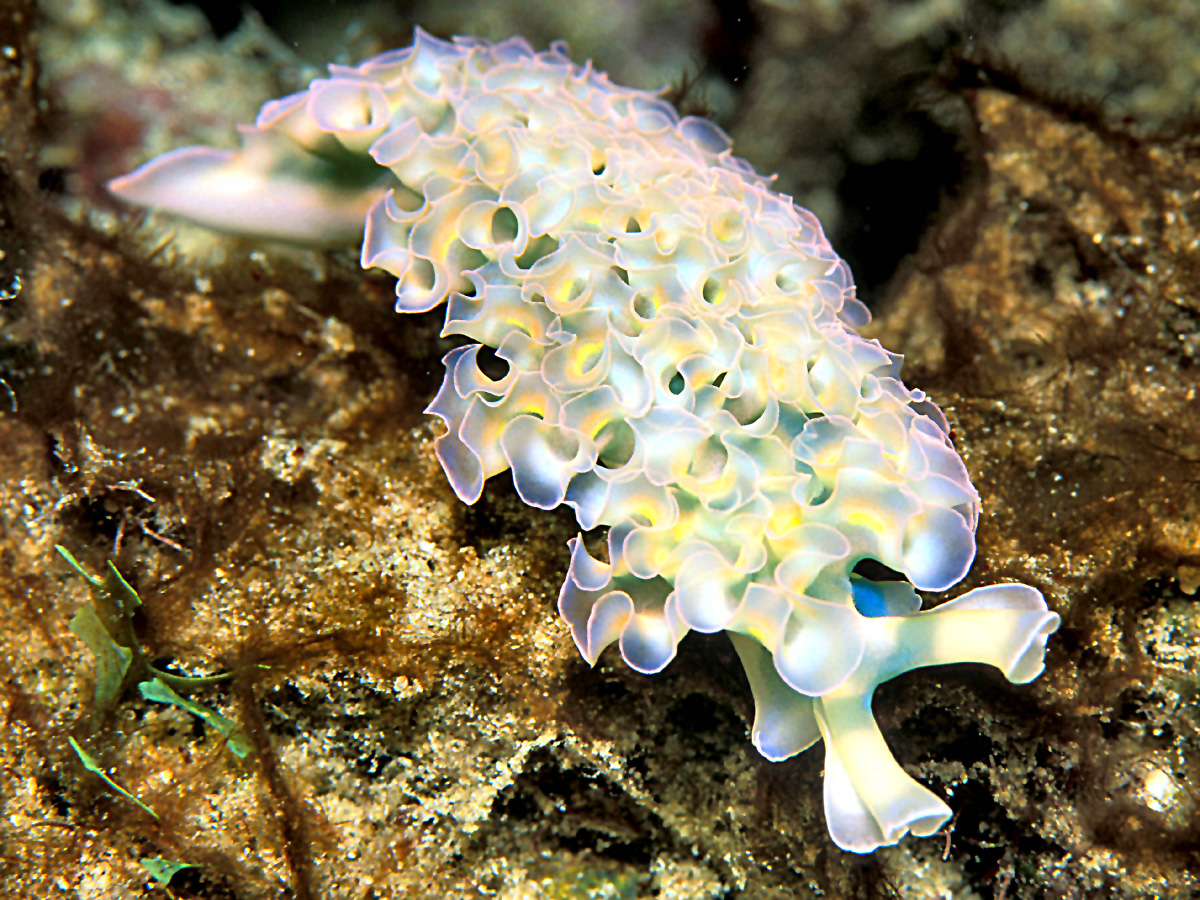
- A live individual of Elysia crispata in situ, head end towards the lower right

Scientific classification
- Domain: Eukaryota
- Kingdom: Animalia
- Phylum: Mollusca
- Class: Gastropoda
- Superorder: Sacoglossa
- Clade: Plakobranchacea

Superfamilies
- See text

= Plakobranchacea =

Family of gastropods

The Plakobranchacea are a clade of sea slugs, marine gastropod molluscs in the clade Sacoglossa.

== Taxonomy ==
- Superfamily Plakobranchoidea
  - Family Boselliidae
  - Family Plakobranchidae
  - Family Platyhedylidae
- Superfamily Limapontioidea
  - Family Caliphyllidae
  - Family Hermaeidae
  - Family Limapontiidae
