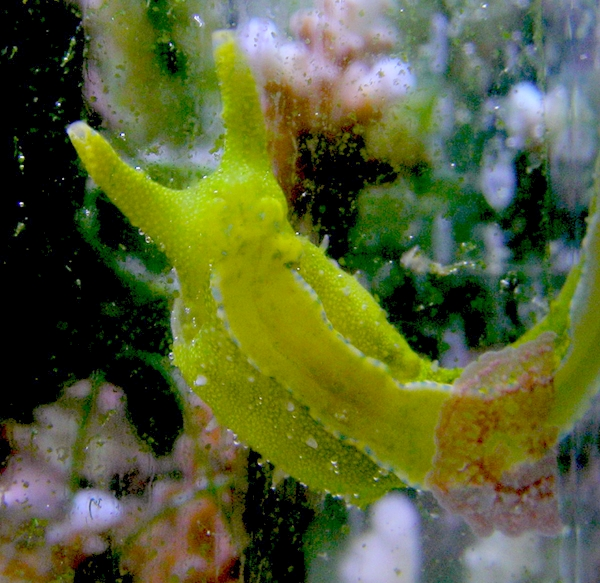
- A view through aquarium glass of the underside of an individual of Oxynoe olivacea

Scientific classification
- Kingdom: Animalia
- Phylum: Mollusca
- Class: Gastropoda
- Subclass: Heterobranchia
- Infraclass: Euthyneura
- Subterclass: Tectipleura
- Superorder: Sacoglossa
- Superfamily: Oxynooidea; Stoliczka, 1868 (1847)

Synonyms
- Cylindrobulloidea Thiele, 1931; Oxynoacea

= Oxynooidea =

Superfamily of gastropods

Oxynooidea is a superfamily of small sea snails, bubble snails and bivalved gastropods, marine gastropod mollusks within the superorder Sacoglossa.

== Families ==
Families within the superfamily Oxynooidea:

- family Cylindrobullidae Thiele, 1931
- family Juliidae E. A. Smith, 1885
- family Oxynoidae Stoliczka, 1868 (1847)
- family Volvatellidae Pilsbry, 1895
