= Typica (disambiguation) =

Typica may refer to:

- Typica, a liturgical service of the Eastern Orthodox Church
- The plural of typicon
- Editio typica, a form of text used in the Catholic Church as an official source text of a particular document
- Typica (program), software for coffee roasters
