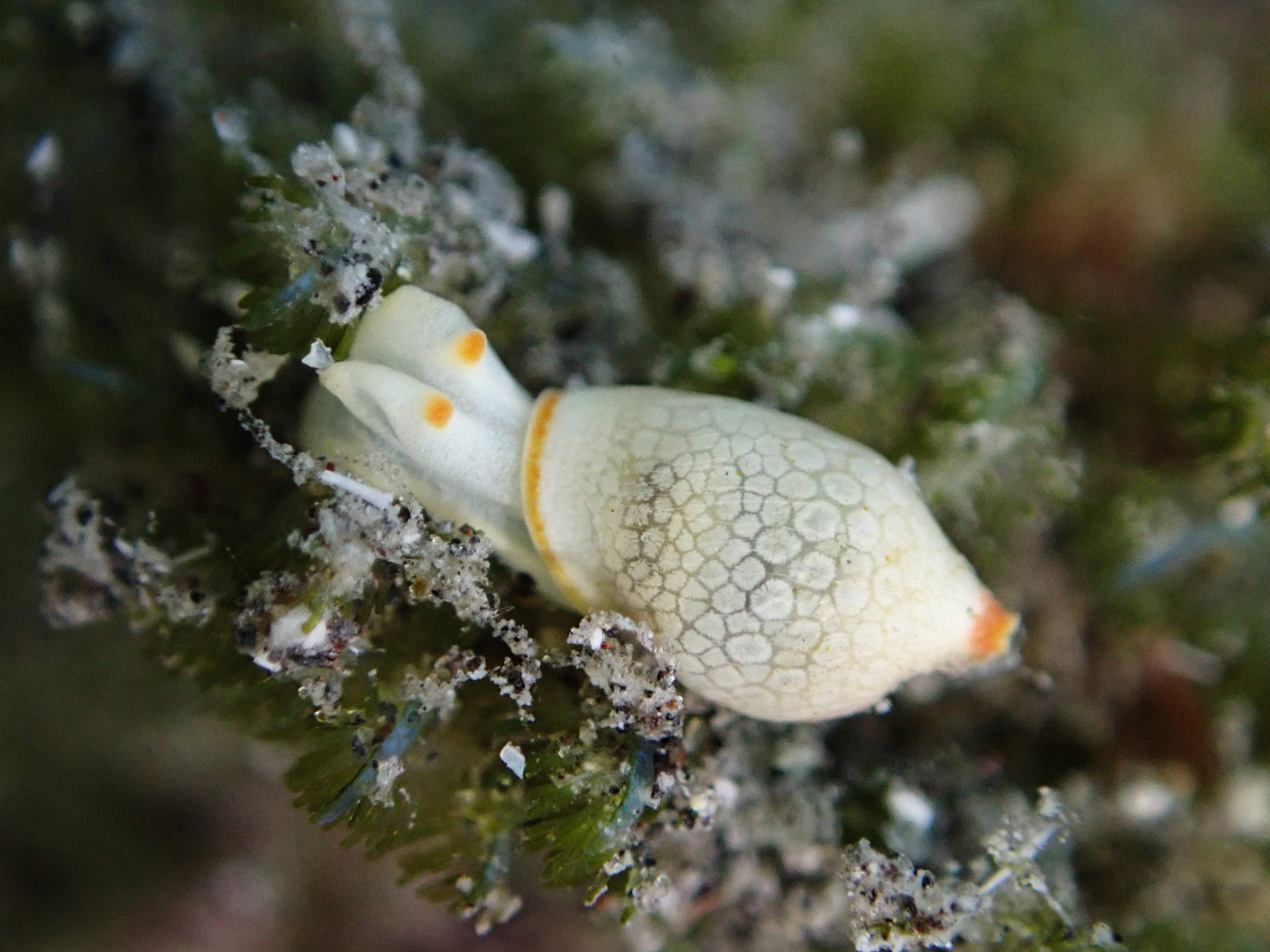
- Volvatella angeliniana

Scientific classification
- Kingdom: Animalia
- Phylum: Mollusca
- Class: Gastropoda
- Superorder: Sacoglossa
- Superfamily: Oxynooidea
- Family: Volvatellidae; Pilsbry, 1895

Genera
- Ascobulla Marcus, 1972; Volvatella Pease, 1860

Synonyms
- Arthessidae C. R. Boettger, 1963; Ascobullidae Habe, Okutani & Nishiwaki, 1994; Volvatellinae Pilsbry, 1895 (original rank)

= Volvatellidae =

Family of gastropods

Volvatellidae is a taxonomic family of sea snails, marine gastropod molluscs in the superfamily Oxynooidea.

This family has no subfamilies.

== Genera ==
There are two genera in the family Volvatellidae:

- Ascobulla Marcus, 1972
- Volvatella Pease, 1860

Synonyms

- Arthessa T. J. Evans, 1950: synonym of Volvatella Pease, 1860
- Arthressa [sic] accepted as Arthessa T. J. Evans, 1950: synonym of Volvatella Pease, 1860 (misspelling)
