= Valve (mollusc) =

Articulating part of a mollusc shell

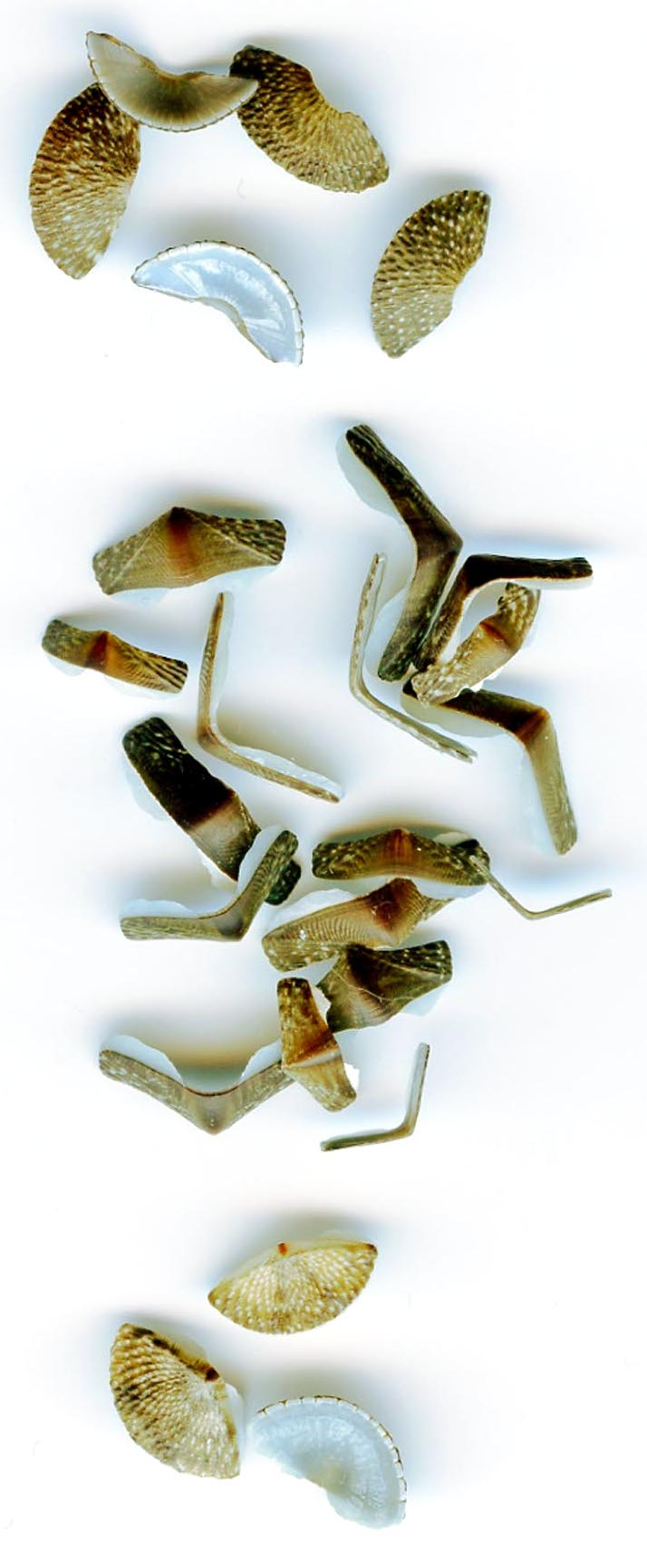
Loose shell plates or valves of Chiton tuberculatus from the beach drift

A valve is each articulating part of the shell of a mollusc or another multi-shelled animal such as brachiopods and some crustaceans. Each part is known as a valve or in the case of chitons, a "plate". Members of two classes of molluscs, the Bivalvia (clams) and the Polyplacophora (chitons), have valves.

Species within one family of very unusual small sea snails, marine opisthobranch gastropods in the family Juliidae, also have two articulating shells or valves, which resemble those of a bivalve. This exceptional family is commonly known as the bivalved gastropods. Gastropods in general are sometimes called "univalves", because in those that have a shell, the shell is usually in one part.

== Chitons ==
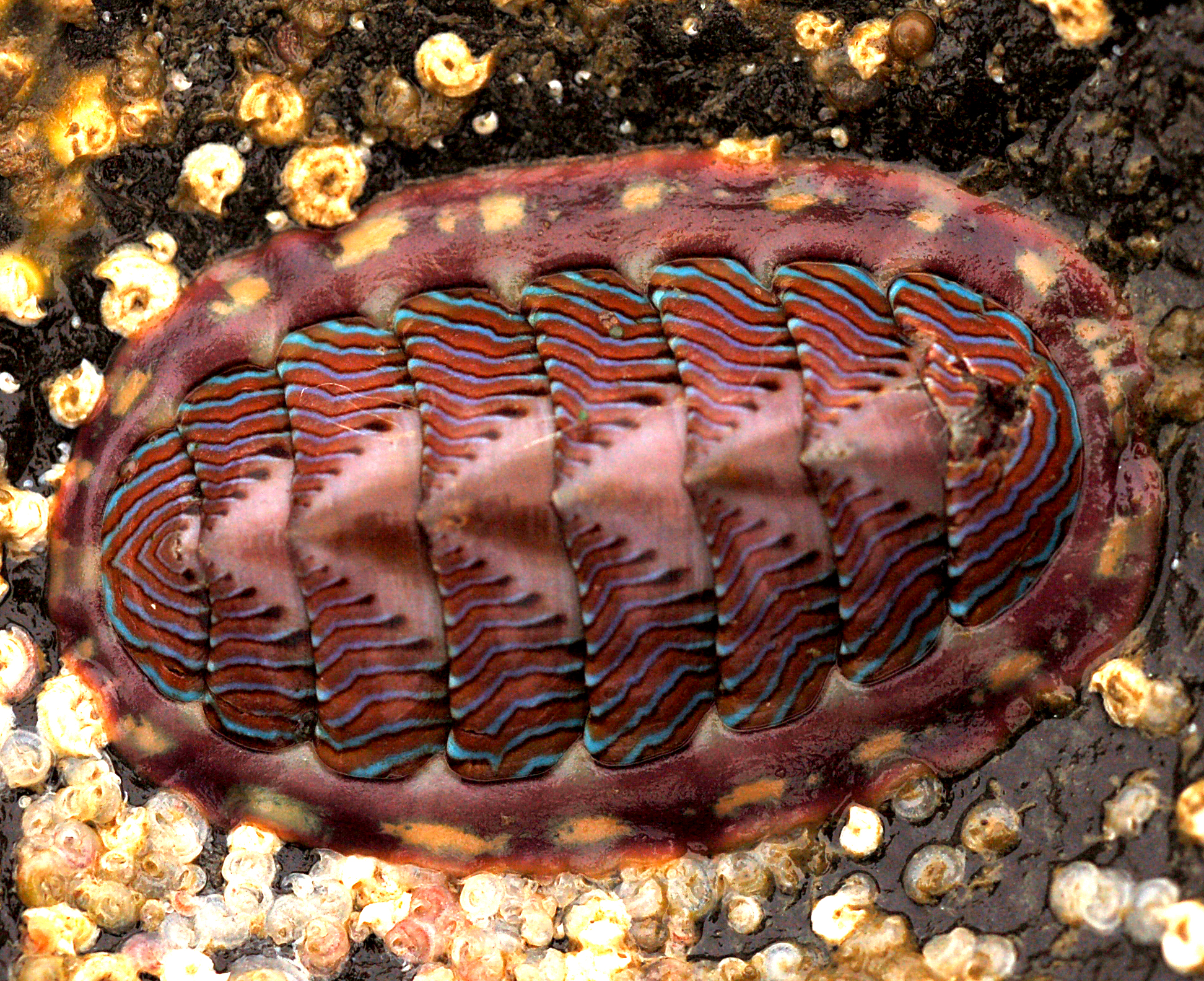
Live individual of the lined chiton Tonicella lineata, head end towards the right

The valves of chitons are eight dorsal, articulated shell plates, which are frequently coloured and sculpted. After death the girdle that holds the plates together disintegrates and the plates separate. Thus individual plates can be found washed up in beach drift, as shown in the image at the top of this article.

== Bivalves ==
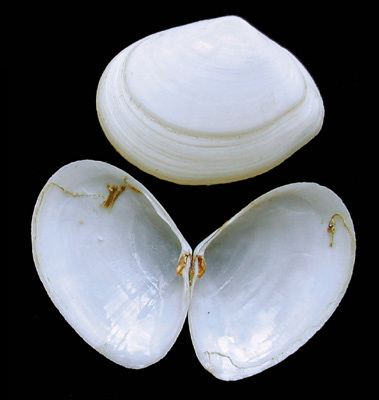
Paired valves of the bivalve Abra alba

Bivalve molluscs (e.g. clams and oysters) have a shell which is composed of two separate but articulating parts. Each one of these two parts is known as a "valve".

The two valves are known as the "right valve" and the "left valve"; these are labeled with respect to the anterior end of the bivalve, when the umbones are facing upward. In many, but not all, bivalves, the two valves are more or less symmetrical and thus (other than the hinge line) look like mirror images of one another.

== Bivalved gastropods ==
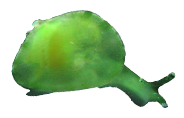
A live individual of an unidentified species of bivalved gastropod in the family Juliidae

The great majority of shelled gastropods or snails have a shell in one part, hence the older name "univalve". The gastropod operculum, when present, even when it is composed mostly of calcium carbonate, is not considered to be a valve.

In contrast, species within one family of small sea snails, the Juliidae, opisthobranch gastropod molluscs, have a hinged shell which is composed of two parts joined by a ligament. These two parts very closely resemble the two valves of a bivalve. This group of species are often referred to as "bivalved gastropods". These are sacoglossans in several genera including Julia, Berthelinia, Midorigai, Edenttellina, Tamanovalva, and Candinia.

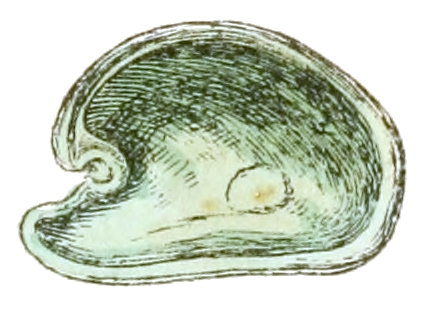
Drawing of the interior of the left valve of the shell of "Julia borbonica"

These bivalve gastropods were for a long time known only from fossils and dead material. Because of this, they had been described as being somewhat atypical bivalves. It was not until living individuals were found in the late 20th century that it was understood that these are in fact very unusual gastropods.

== Other animals ==
Valves are present in any animal with two or more shell portions connecting at a hinge. Brachiopods are bivalved animals with two valves stacked vertically (rather than laterally). The dorsal, or brachial valve hosts the brachial system which supports feeding structures, while the rear end of the ventral, or pedicle valve sends out a fleshy holdfast known as a pedicle. Though each valve has its own symmetrical structure, the two valves have different overall forms and are not mirror images of each other. This distinguishes their valves from those of actual bivalves, which form an identical, but mirrored structure as they are derived from the side of the body.

Some crustaceans have a pair of valves which meet at a hinge. These "bivalved crustaceans" include various fossil and living forms, such as ostracods (seed shrimp), conchostracans (clam shrimp), and phyllocarids.
