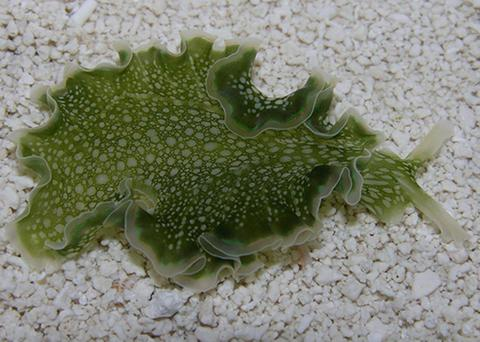
- Elysia crispata, a shell-less species in the family Placobranchidae
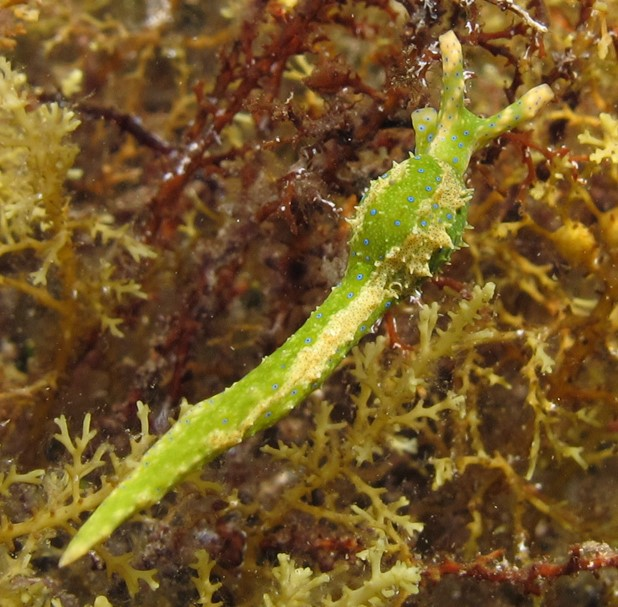
- Oxynoe viridis, a shelled sacoglossan in the family Oxynoidae

Scientific classification
- Kingdom: Animalia
- Phylum: Mollusca
- Class: Gastropoda
- Subterclass: Tectipleura
- Superorder: Sacoglossa; H. von Ihering, 1876

Diversity
- 284 species

Synonyms
- Ascoglossa Bergh, 1876

= Sacoglossa =

Sacoglossa Temporal range: Eocene – present

Clade of gastropods

Sacoglossa is a superorder of small sea slugs and sea snails, marine gastropod mollusks, belonging to the clade Heterobranchia, whose members are known as sacoglossans. There are 284 valid species recognized within this superorder. Sacoglossans live by ingesting the cellular contents of algae, hence they are sometimes called "sap-sucking sea slugs". Some sacoglossans simply digest the fluid which they suck from the algae, but in some other species, the slugs sequester and use within their own tissues living chloroplasts from the algae they eat, a very unusual phenomenon known as kleptoplasty, for the "stolen" plastids. This earns them the title of the "solar-powered sea slugs", and makes them unique among metazoan organisms, for otherwise kleptoplasty is known only among other euthyneurans and single-celled protists.

The Sacoglossa are divided into two clades - the shelled families (Oxynoacea) and the shell-less families (Plakobranchacea). The four families of shelled species are Cylindrobullidae, Volvatellidae, Oxynoidae, and Juliidae, the bivalved gastropods. The shell-less Plakobranchacea are grouped in six families, divided between two clades ("superfamilies"), the Plakobranchoidea and the Limapontioidea. All sacoglossans are distinguished from related groups by the presence of a single row of teeth on the radula. The teeth are adapted for the suctorial feeding habits of the group.

== Appearance ==
Many of these gastropods (e.g. Elysia spp.) resemble winged slugs with a pair of cephalic tentacles. In photosynthetic members of the group, the wings, or parapodia, can be unfurled to maximise the area of the organism that is struck by sunlight. In others (e.g. Placida spp.), cylindrical cerata extend from the dorsal surface. The majority of sacoglossans are 1–3 cm in length; they are typically uniform in color because the chloroplasts they ingest end up installed in their own cells.

== Distribution ==
Sacoglossa species are found worldwide in tropical and temperate oceans, but most live in the central Pacific Ocean, where they frequent the shorelines of tropical islands; diverse tracts of species are also known in the Caribbean and Indo-Pacific. These three areas have distinct ranges of species, indicating a high degree of biogeographic separation. Where sacoglossans are present further from the equator, in places such as Australia or Japan, diversity is lower, and the species present are typically tropical species that have a higher tolerance for temperature variation. Their temperate distribution closely corresponds to the distribution of their important food source, Caulerpa spp. They typically live at very low population densities, making scientific study of the group difficult.

== Use of ingested cellular material ==
The sacoglossans can use the chloroplasts of the algae on which they feed, which they keep alive for hours to months after their ingestion. They maintain the cells and metabolise the photosynthetic products; this process is termed kleptoplasty, and the sacoglossans are the only animals to employ it; some ciliates and foraminifera (protists) also employ the strategy. Sacoglossans have been known to survive for months living solely on the photosynthetic products of their acquired plastids. This process is somewhat mystifying, as the upkeep of chloroplasts usually requires interaction with genes encoded in the plant cell nucleus. This seems to suggest that the genes have been laterally transferred from algae to the animals. DNA amplification experiments on Elysia chlorotica adults and eggs using Vaucheria litorea derived primers revealed the presence of psbO, an algal nuclear gene. These results were likely an artefact, as most recent results based on transcriptomic analysis and sequencing of genomic DNA from the slug's eggs reject the hypothesis that lateral gene transfer supports kleptoplast longevity. Sacoglossans are able to choose which method of feeding they use. The switch from active feeding to photosynthesis in sacoglossans is triggered by the shortage of food resources, and typically not preferred. If food is readily available, the animal will actively consume it. Starvation periods (with photosynthesis and no active feeding) vary between species of sacoglossans from less than a week to over four months, and photosynthesis is used as a last-resort mechanism to avoid mortality. Another unclear step in the process is how the chloroplasts are protected from digestion, and how they adapt to their new position in animal cells without the membranes that would control their environment in the algae. However it is achieved, kleptoplasty is an important strategy for many genera of Placobranchacea. One species of Elysia feeds on a seasonally calcifying alga. Because it is unable to penetrate the calcified cell walls, the animal can only feed for part of the year, relying on the ingested chloroplasts to survive whilst the foodstuff is calcified, until later in the season when the calcification is lost and the grazing can continue.

Sacoglossans can also use antiherbivory compounds produced by their algal foodstuffs to deter their own would-be predators, in a process termed kleptochemistry. This may be achieved by converting algal metabolites to toxins, or by using algal pigments for camouflage in a process termed nutritional homochromy.

== Oxynoacea ==
Around 20% of sacoglossan species bear a shell. The Oxynoacea contains three shelled families, and all feed solely on algae of the genus Caulerpa. None of these organisms benefits from the photosynthesis of the ingested chloroplasts, but the chloroplasts may have been retained to perform a camouflaging function. The shells of the Volvatellidae and Oxynoidae somewhat resemble those of the cephalaspid bubble snails. The Juliidae are extraordinary in that they are shelled, bivalved gastropods. They have a shell in two pieces, which resemble the valves of a minute clam. Living members of this family have been known since 1959, and had previously only been known to science as fossils (which had been interpreted as bivalves).

== Plakobranchoidea ==
The majority of sacoglossans are shell-less; consequently, the Plakobranchoidea are commonly described using the vernacular term "sea slugs", which can lead to their confusion with the only very distantly related nudibranchs. However, the plakobranchoid Elysia (and undoubtedly others) do develop a shell before hatching from their egg. Indeed, at least the Elysiidae, Limapontiidae, and Hermaeidae all bear larval shells, which are spiral, and possess between three-quarters and one complete whorl.

The plakobranchoids have a more diverse feeding range than the Oxynoacea, feeding on a wider range of green (and sometimes red) algae, and even, in three cases, being carnivorous.

== Evolution ==
The ancestor of the Sacoglossa is presumed to have fed on a now-extinct calcifying green alga in the Udoteaceae. The first fossil evidence of the group comes from bivalved shells dating to the Eocene, and further bivalved shells are known from later geological periods, although the thin nature of the shells and their high-erosion habitat usually make for poor preservation. The corresponding fossil record of algae points to an origin of the group deeper in time, perhaps as early as the Jurassic or Cretaceous.

The loss of the shell, which was apparently a single evolutionary event, opened up a new ecological avenue for the clade, as the chloroplasts of the green algae on which they fed could now be retained and used as functioning chloroplasts, which could generate energy by photosynthesis.

== Taxonomy ==
The suborder name comes from the Greek words σάκος sákos "shield" and γλώσσα glóssa "tongue" because the species have single toothed radulas.

=== 2004 taxonomy ===
This taxonomy follows Marin 2004.

- Cylindrobulloidea
  - Cylindrobullidae
    - Cylindrobulla
- Oxynoacea (Shelled sacoglossans)
  Juliidae
  Julia
  Berthelinia
  Volvatellidae
  Ascobulla
  Volvatella
  Oxynoidae
  Oxynoe
  Lobiger
  Roburnella

- Plakobranchacea (Non-shelled sacoglossans)
- Superfamily Plakobranchoidea (= Plakobranchacea; = Elysioidea)
  Plakobranchidae (=Elysiidae)
  Elysia
  Thuridilla
  Plakobranchus
  Elysiella
  Tridachia
  Tridachiella
  Pattyclaya
  Boselliidae
  Bosellia
  Platyhedylidae
  Platyhedyle
  Gaschignella
- Superfamily Limapontioidea (= Polybranchioidea; = Stiligeroidea)
  Limapontiidae (Stillergeridae)
  Placida
  Ercolania
  Stiliger
  Calliopaea
  Olea
  Alderia
  Alderiopsis
  Limapontia
  Polybranchiidae (= Caliphyllidae)
  Caliphylla
  Cyerce
  Hermaeidae
  Hermaeopsis
  Hermaea
  Aplysiopsis

=== 2005 taxonomy ===
In the taxonomy of Bouchet & Rocroi (2005), the clade Sacoglossa is arranged as follows:

- Subclade Oxynoacea
  - Superfamily Oxynooidea: family Oxynoidae, family Juliidae, family Volvatellidae
- Subclade Plakobranchacea
  - Superfamily Plakobranchoidea: family Plakobranchidae, family Boselliidae, family Platyhedylidae,
  - Superfamily Limapontioidea: family Limapontiidae, family Caliphyllidae, family Hermaeidae

In this taxonomy, the family Elysiidae Forbes & Hanley, 1851 is considered a synonym of the family Placobranchidae Gray, 1840, and the families Oleidae O'Donoghue, 1926and Stiligeridae Iredale & O'Donoghue, 1923 are synonyms of the family Limapontiidae Gray, 1847.

The family Cylindrobullidae belongs to the superfamily Cylindrobulloidea in the sister "group" Cylindrobullida.

=== 2010 taxonomy ===
Jörger et al. (2010) moved Sacoglossa into the Panpulmonata.

A molecular phylogeny analysis by Maeda et al. (2010) confirmed the placement of Cylindrobulla within the Sacoglossa.

=== 2017 taxonomy ===
Bouchet et al. (2017) moved Sacoglossa from Panpulmonata to the subterclass Tectipleura.

== Autotomy ==
Extreme autotomy has been observed on two species, Elysia marginata and E. atroviridis, studied in vitro. Over the course of the study, some individuals decapitated themselves, a behavior known as autotomy. The neck wound usually closed within one day, and the heads, especially in younger specimens, began to feed on algae within hours. Twenty days later, an entirely new body had regrown, while the discarded bodies never regrew heads. In E. atroviridis, three of 82 studied individuals autotomized, and two of the three eventually grew new bodies. All of these animals were infected with small crustaceans known as copepods. In another group of 64 without parasites, none self-decapitated, leading the researchers to hypothesize that animals cast off their bodies as a means to get rid of parasites. Another possibility is that the slugs autotomized to escape predators, but when the researchers tried to mimic an enemy's attack by pinching and cutting the creatures, none cast off their bodies. The process itself takes several hours, which the scientists say would make it ineffective as means of escape.

How the slugs survive without a heart and other vital organs for nearly a month remains a mystery. Mitoh and her colleagues suspect it may be tied to their ability to survive using the photosynthetic algae in their diet while other energy sources are unavailable.
