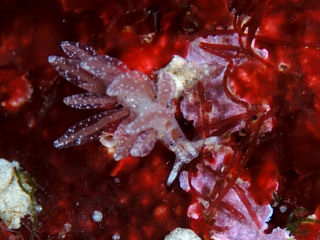
- Stiliger berghi

Scientific classification
- Kingdom: Animalia
- Phylum: Mollusca
- Class: Gastropoda
- Superorder: Sacoglossa
- Superfamily: Plakobranchoidea
- Family: Limapontiidae
- Genus: Stiliger; Ehrenberg, 1831

Type species
- Stiliger ornatus Ehrenberg, 1828

= Stiliger =

Genus of gastropods

Stiliger is a genus of small and minute sacoglossan or sap-sucking sea slugs. They are marine gastropod mollusks in the family Limapontiidae.

They somewhat resemble nudibranchs, but are not closely related to them. They are a rich green in color, caused by the green algae they eat.

== Species ==
Species in the genus Stiliger include:

- Stiliger akkeshiensis Baba, 1935
- Stiliger auarita Caballer, Ortea & Moro, 2009
- Stiliger aureomarginatus Jensen, 1993
- Stiliger berghi Baba, 1937
- Stiliger costai Pruvot-fol, 1951
- Stiliger fuscovittatus Lance, 1962 - brown-streak stiliger
- Stiliger illus Er. Marcus, 1965
- Stiliger llerae Ortea, 1981
- Stiliger ornatus Ehrenberg, 1831
- Stiliger viridis (Kelaart, 1858)
- Stiliger vossi Ev. Marcus and Er. Marcus, 1960

Species brought into synonymy

- Stiliger amphibius Allman, 1845: synonym of Alderia modesta (Lovén, 1844)
- Stiliger bellulus (Orgibny, 1837): synonym of Calliopaea bellula d'Orbigny, 1837
- Stiliger boodleae Baba, 1938: synonym of Ercolania boodleae (Baba, 1938)
- Stiliger cricetus Er. Marcus & Ev. Marcus, 1970: synonym of Ercolania coerulea Trinchese, 1892
- Stiliger erbsus Ev. Marcus & Er. Marcus, 1970: synonym of Ercolania erbsus (Ev. Marcus & Er. Marcus, 1970) (original combination)
- Stiliger felinus (Hutton, 1882): synonym of Ercolania felina (F. W. Hutton, 1882)
- Stiliger formicarius Baba, 1959: synonym of Costasiella formicaria (Baba, 1959)
- Stiliger fuscatus Gould, 1870: synonym of Ercolania fuscata (Gould, 1870)
- Stiliger gopalai Rao, 1937: synonym of Ercolania gopalai (Rao, 1937)
- Stiliger lilianae Ev. Marcus & Er. Marcus, 1969 : synonym of Costasiella ocellifera (Simroth, 1895)
- Stiliger llerai Ortea, 1981: synonym of Stiliger llerae Ortea, 1981
- Stiliger mariae (Meyer & Möbius, 1865): synonym of Calliopaea bellula d'Orbigny, 1837
- Stiliger modestus Lovén, 1844: synonym of Alderia modesta (Lovén, 1844)
- Stiliger niger Lemche, 1935: synonym of Ercolania nigra (Lemche, 1935)
- Stiliger nigrovittatus Rao & Rao, 1963: synonym of Ercolania raorum (Ev. Marcus & Er. Marcus, 1970) (Invalid: junior secondary homonym of Stiliger nigrovittatus (A. Costa, 1866); Stiliger raorum is a replacement name)
- Stiliger noto Baba, 1959: synonym of Hermaea noto (Baba, 1959)
- Stiliger oophaga (Lemche, 1972): synonym of Calliopaea oophaga Lemche in Gascoigne & Sartory, 1974
- Stiliger pica Annandale & Prashad, 1922: synonym of Ercolania pica (Annandale & Prashad, 1922)
- Stiliger pusillus Baba, 1959: synonym of Calliopaea pusilla (Baba, 1968)
- Stiliger scaldianus (Nyst, 1855): synonym of Alderia modesta (Lovén, 1844)
- Stiliger smaragdinus Baba, 1949: synonym of Sacoproteus smaragdinus (Baba, 1949) as type species of the genus Sacoproteus
- Stiliger subviridis Baba, 1959: synonym of Ercolania subviridis (Baba, 1959)
- Stiliger talis Ev. Marcus & Er. Marcus, 1956: synonym of Ercolania talis (Ev. Marcus & Er. Marcus, 1956) (original combination)
- Stiliger tentaculatus Eliot, 1917: synonym of Ercolania tentaculata (Eliot, 1917) (original combination)
- Stiliger vanellus Er. Marcus, 1957: synonym of Ercolania fuscata (Gould, 1870)
- Stiliger varians Eliot, 1904: synonym of Ercolania varians (Eliot, 1904)
- Stiliger vesiculosus (Deshayes, 1853): synonym of Calliopaea bellula d'Orbigny, 1837
- Stiliger zosterae Baba, 1959: synonym of Hermaea zosterae (Baba, 1959)
