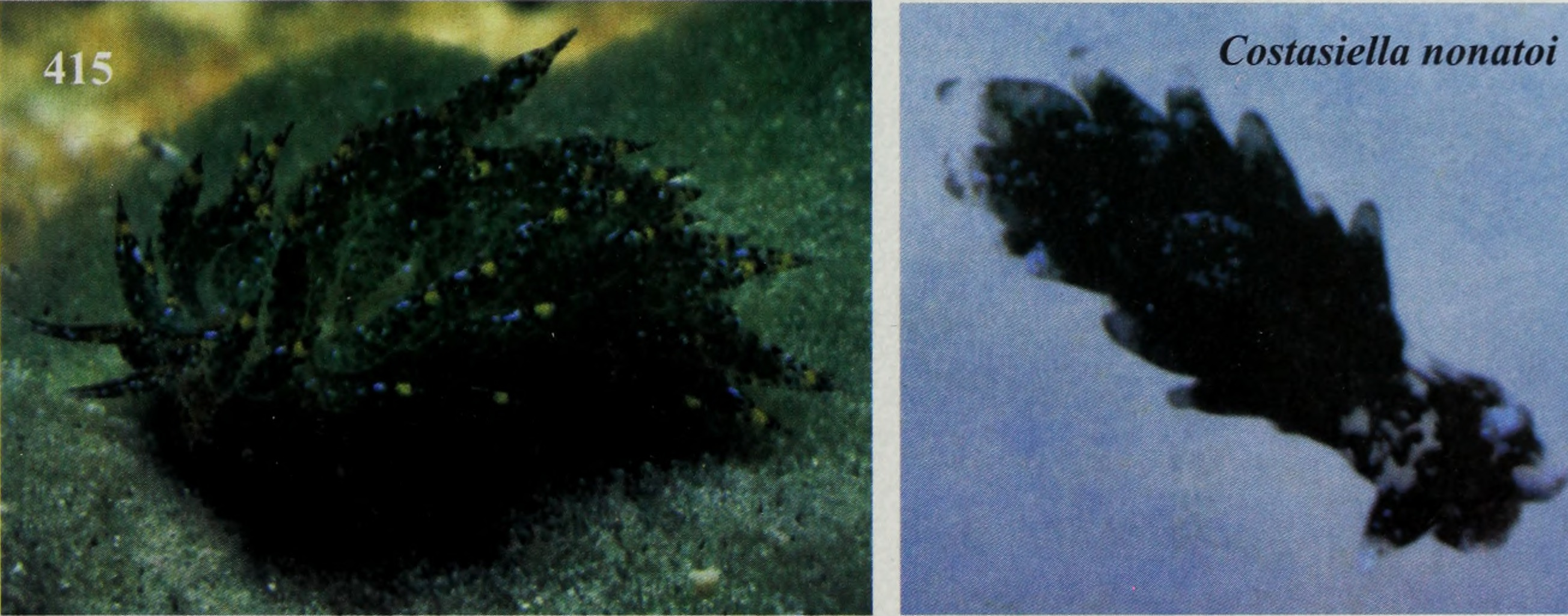

Scientific classification
- Domain: Eukaryota
- Kingdom: Animalia
- Phylum: Mollusca
- Class: Gastropoda
- Family: Costasiellidae
- Genus: Costasiella
- Species: C. nonatoi

Binomial name
- Costasiella nonatoi Marcus & Marcus, 1960

Synonyms
- Placida nonatoi Marcus & Marcus, 1970

= Costasiella nonatoi =

Species of mollusc (sea slug)

Costasiella nonatoi is a species of sacoglossan sea slug in the genus Costasiella. It is one of few species in the genus that is not photosynthetic. The description of this species was based on two specimens which were serially sectioned and designated as the holotype. The species was named after Dr. Edmundo Nonato, a professor at the Oceanographic Institute of the University of São Paulo.

== Geographic range ==
Costasiella nonatoi inhabits the coastal areas of the Caribbean sea and some of the Atlantic Ocean. Individuals can be found off the shores of Florida in the Gulf of Mexico, Brazil, Panama, and Curaçao.

== Habitat ==
Resides in warm marine waters, specifically burrowing within different species of green algae.

== Physical description ==
This slug is typically between 2 and 4 mm and is primarily black in colour with opaque white or transparent tips of rhinophores, cerata, foot, tail, and periocular area.

== Genetic information ==
Five sequences exist within the barcode of life database of this species with barcodes. Multiple portions of mitochondrial DNA have been sequenced along with consumed chloroplasts.

== Phylogeny and taxonomy ==
Phylogenetic analysis places C. nonatoi as an outgroup. This species is less closely related to other Costasiella species and is also visually distinct. It was the second Costasiella species ever described, and was described by Marcus & Marcus in 1960. It then was reassigned to the genus Placida in 1970, again by Marcus & Marcus. Finally, in 1982 it was placed back into the Costasiella genus by Marcus & Marcus where it has remained since.

== Behaviour ==
Closely related species, like Costasiella kuroshimae, along with some other Sacoglossan species carry out a process called functional kleptoplasty. This is a process in which the digestion of algal plastids consumed by the organisms is delayed. The retention of the plastids provides nutrition the to gastropods via photosynthesis. Costasiella nonatoi rapidly digests the plastids of the algae it feeds on, therefore not carrying out functional kleptoplasty.

Slugs of this species tend to burrow into the thallus of Avrainvillea to feed as well as deposit their egg masses. Costasiella ocellifera, a closely related and visually similar species also resides on this algae, but tends not to burrow within it.

== Diet ==
It has previously been suggested that C. nonatoi feeds on Avrainvillea sp., a genus of green algae. However, new evidence suggests that Avrainvillea sp. may only be consumed by functional kleptoplasts. C. nonatoi may feed on unidentified species of algae related to Bryopsis and Pseudochlorodesmis according to barcode analysis.
