= Alderia willowi =

Scientific classification
- Kingdom: Animalia
- Phylum: Mollusca
- Class: Gastropoda
- Family: Limapontiidae
- Genus: Alderia
- Species: A. willowi

Binomial name
- Alderia willowi Krug, Patrick et al., 2007

Species of gastropod

Alderia willowi is a species of sea slug, a marine gastropod mollusc in the family Limapontiidae. It is a sacoglossan.

This species is endemic to the U.S. state of California. It was previously thought to be Alderia modesta, but there turned out to be a cryptic species pair.

This species is poecilogonous, in other words it has variable larval development modes.

The slug was discovered by a team led by Patrick Krug of California State University, Los Angeles. The species is named after Krug's grandmother, and after the fictional character Willow Rosenberg from Buffy the Vampire Slayer television series, because the variable reproductive modes of the sea slug are reminiscent of the switch in sexual orientation that the character Willow underwent in season 4 of the show.
