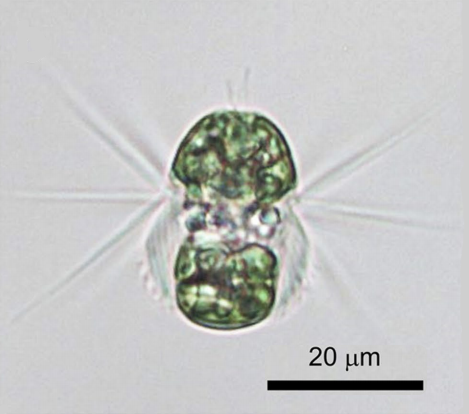
- Mesodinium species containing green plastids taken from cryptophyte prey

Scientific classification
- Domain: Eukaryota
- Clade: Sar
- Clade: Alveolata
- Phylum: Ciliophora
- Class: Litostomatea
- Order: Cyclotrichiida
- Family: Mesodiniidae
- Genus: Mesodinium von Stein

Species
- Mesodinium chamaeleon; Mesodinium coatsi; Mesodinium major; Mesodinium rubrum; Mesodinium pulex; Mesodinium pupula

= Mesodinium =

Genus of single-celled organisms

Mesodinium is a genus of ciliates that are widely distributed and are abundant in marine and brackish waters.

Currently, six marine species of Mesodinium have been described and grouped by nutritional mode: plastidic (M. chamaeleon, M. coatsi, M. major, and M. rubrum) or heterotrophic (M. pulex and M. pupula). There is some debate as to whether the nutritional mode of plastidic Mesodinium species is phototrophic (permanent plastid) or mixotrophic. Among the plastidic species, wild M. major and M. rubrum populations possess red plastids belonging to genera Teleaulax, Plagioselmis, and Geminigera, while wild M. chamaeleon and M. coatsi populations normally contain green plastids. The availability of suitable cryptophyte prey is important for bloom formation of plastidic Mesodinium species.

The most common species, Mesodinium rubrum, causes red tides in many coastal ecosystems. Although M. rubrum is known as a nontoxic species, blooms of the ciliate can be potentially harmful to aquaculture industries. M. rubrum photosynthesizes by sequestering the nucleus of its cryptophyte prey, in order to maintain stolen plastids and other organelles. In this way, the genus Mesodinium plays an important role in linking cryptophycean prey and diverse predators in the aquatic microbial food web. For example, the dinoflagellates Dinophysis spp., which are a predator of M. rubrum and the source of their cryptophyte-derived plastids, have been frequently observed to precede or to coincide with high densities of M. rubrum.

== See also ==
- Karyoklepty
- Kleptoplasty
- Mesodinium nuclear code
