= A. nigricans =

A. nigricans may refer to:

- Acacia nigricans, a wattle species endemic to an area on the south coast of Western Australia
- Acanthurus nigricans, a tang fish species from the Eastern Indian Ocean
- Acronicta nigricans, a moth species found in western China
- Aspideretes nigricans, the black soft-shelled turtle or Bostami turtle, a freshwater turtle species found in India and Bangladesh
- Avrainvillea nigricans, an algae species in the genus Avrainvillea

== Synonyms ==
- Australorbis nigricans, a synonym for Biomphalaria tenagophila, an air-breathing freshwater snail species

== See also ==
- Nigricans (disambiguation)
