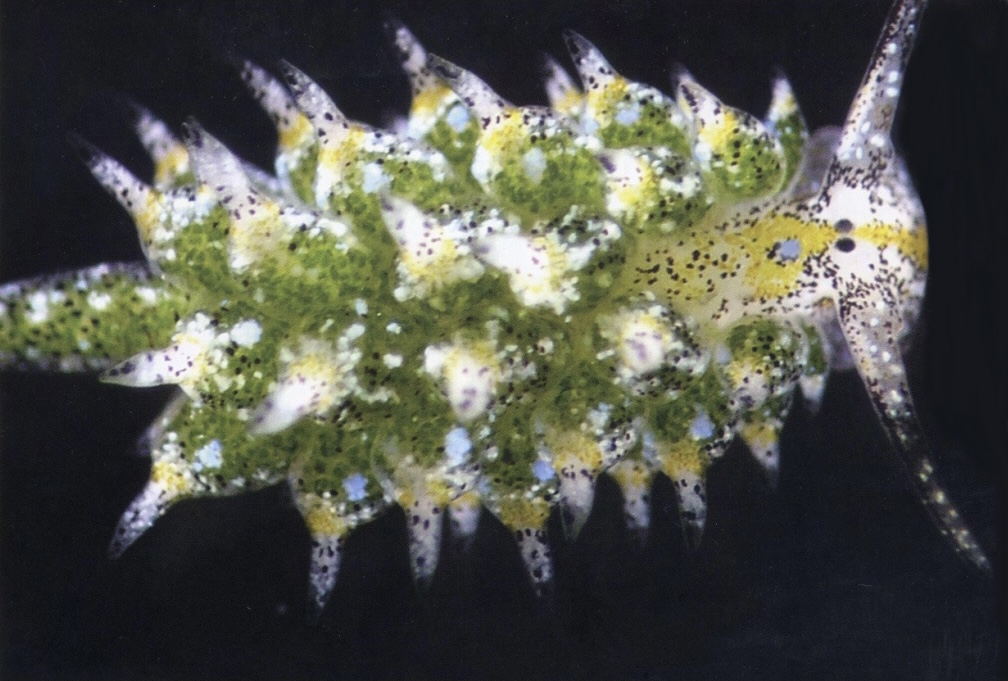

Scientific classification
- Kingdom: Animalia
- Phylum: Mollusca
- Class: Gastropoda
- Superorder: Sacoglossa
- Family: Costasiellidae
- Genus: Costasiella
- Species: C. ocellifera

Binomial name
- Costasiella ocellifera (Simroth, 1895)
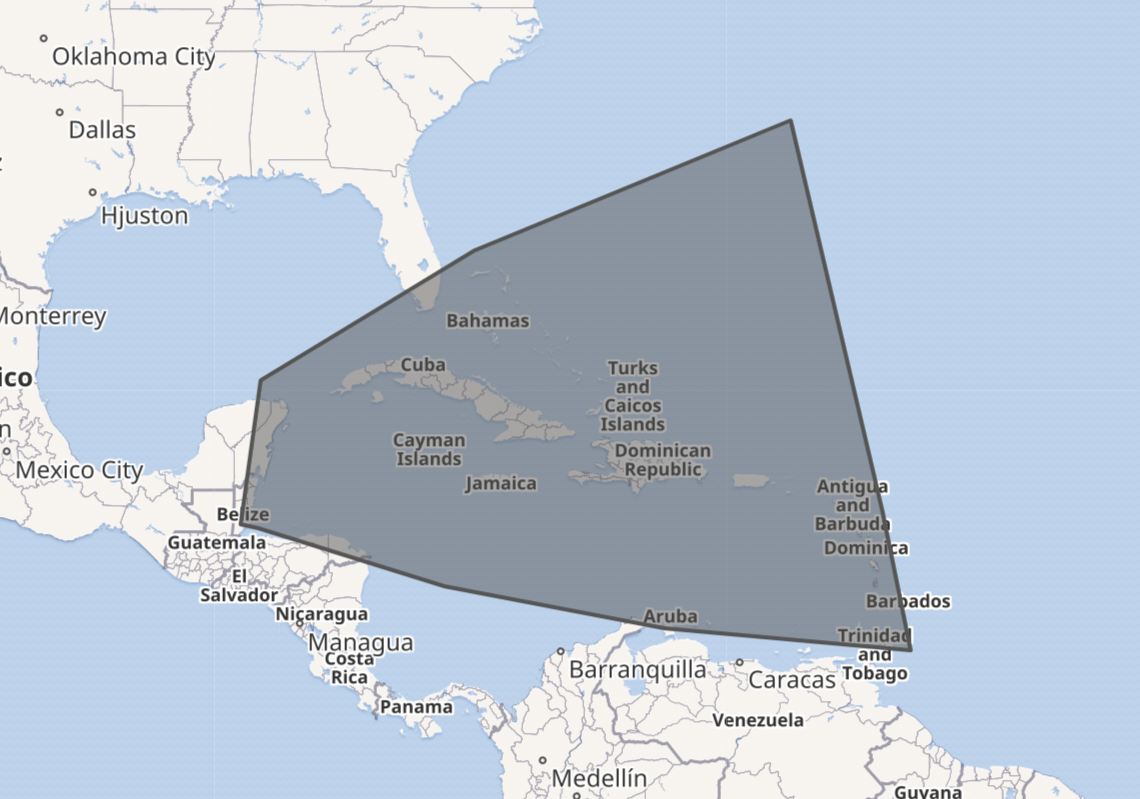

Synonyms
- Doto ocellifera Simroth, 1895; Costasiella lilianae (Ev. Marcus & Er. Marcus, 1969); Stiliger lilianae Ev. Marcus & Er. Marcus, 1969

= Costasiella ocellifera =

Species of gastropod

Costasiella ocellifera is a small (5–13 mm) species of sea slug, a shell-less marine gastropod mollusk in the family Costasiellidae. Costasiella ocellifera, and other members of the family Costasiellidae are often mistakenly classified as nudibranchs because they superficially resemble other species of that group, but they are actually a part of the Sacoglossa superorder of sea slugs, also known as the "sap-sucking sea slugs", "crawling leaves" or the "solar-powered sea slugs". C. ocellifera was discovered by Simroth in 1895, and was initially classified as Doto ocellifera. The Brazilian species, Costasiella liliana, is a synonym of C. ocellifera. Costasiella ocellifera shows long-term retention of functional kleptoplasty.

== Etymology ==
The name 'ocellifera' comes from the Latin word for eye, ''ocellus'' and the Latin word "ifer" which means "to carry" and is in reference to the blue eyespot found on the top of Costasiella ocellifera's head.

== Distribution ==
This species of Costasiella has only been found within the tropical/subtropical Atlantic Ocean region, but within that region it has been found in several places, including, the Bahamas, Barbados, Belize, Bermuda, Dominican Republic, Florida, Honduras, Jamaica, and some areas of Mexico.

Costasiella ocellifera inhabits shallow coastal waters and is almost always found on the plant species Avrainvillea nigricans. In fact, the distribution of this sea slug is interrelated with the distribution of the Avrainvillea algae.

== Description ==
The body of C. ocellifera is a white, somewhat translucent color and speckled with small black dots. A majority of the upper surface of the body is covered in pointed cerata. Similar to the body, the cerata are also translucent, however, they contain digestive gland ducts, which appear green because of the chloroplasts the sea slug has digested. The cerata are organized in five to six diagonal rows with four cerata in each row. The tips of the cerata are white, with a light orange-yellow colored ring just below the tip. The cerata is speckled with small black, white and blue iridescent spots. The top of the head is an orange-yellow color, and it has two large horn-like rhinophores. The rhinophores are semi-translucent, but towards the tip they appear black due to the large clusters of black dots. There are two distinct black eyes in between the rhinophores. The area around the eyes is almost always completely white and is sometimes described as resembling an eye-mask. Directly behind the eyes and rhinophores is a blue eyespot that is the distinguishing characteristic of this species. They have a tail resembling the ceras. These slugs, like all other sacoglossan slugs, have a radula with only one row of teeth that allow the slugs to skillfully puncture the cell wall of the algae, Avrainvillea. Finally, these sea slugs average about 5mm in size, but can grow up to 13mm.

== Characteristics ==
Shell-less Sacoglossan sea slug are often preyed upon by small predatory fish, some nemerteans species, cnidarians, crustaceans, and even some carnivorous coral species. In order to protect themselves from these predators, C. ocellifera was able to develop a chemical defense system by using secondary metabolites that come from the algae they feed on, Avrainvillea. Using Thin-layer chromatography (TLC), scientists were able to identify the metabolite as avrainvilleol. This chemical defense is so effective that in a laboratory test, several slugs were placed into a tank filled with predatory fish (bluehead wrasses), and it was observed that whenever a sea slug was eaten by a fish it was almost immediately spit back out, unharmed. In addition to the chemical defense mechanism, these sea slugs have also evolved an effective camouflage defense. This is because they digest algae chloroplasts, which turns their cerata green in color. This helps them blend in with the surrounding algae.

Costasiella ocellifera also shows long-term retention of functional kleptoplasty, which means that they have the ability to ingest functioning chloroplasts from algae, and survive using photosynthesis for up to 65 days when starved.

== Kleptoplasty/feeding ==
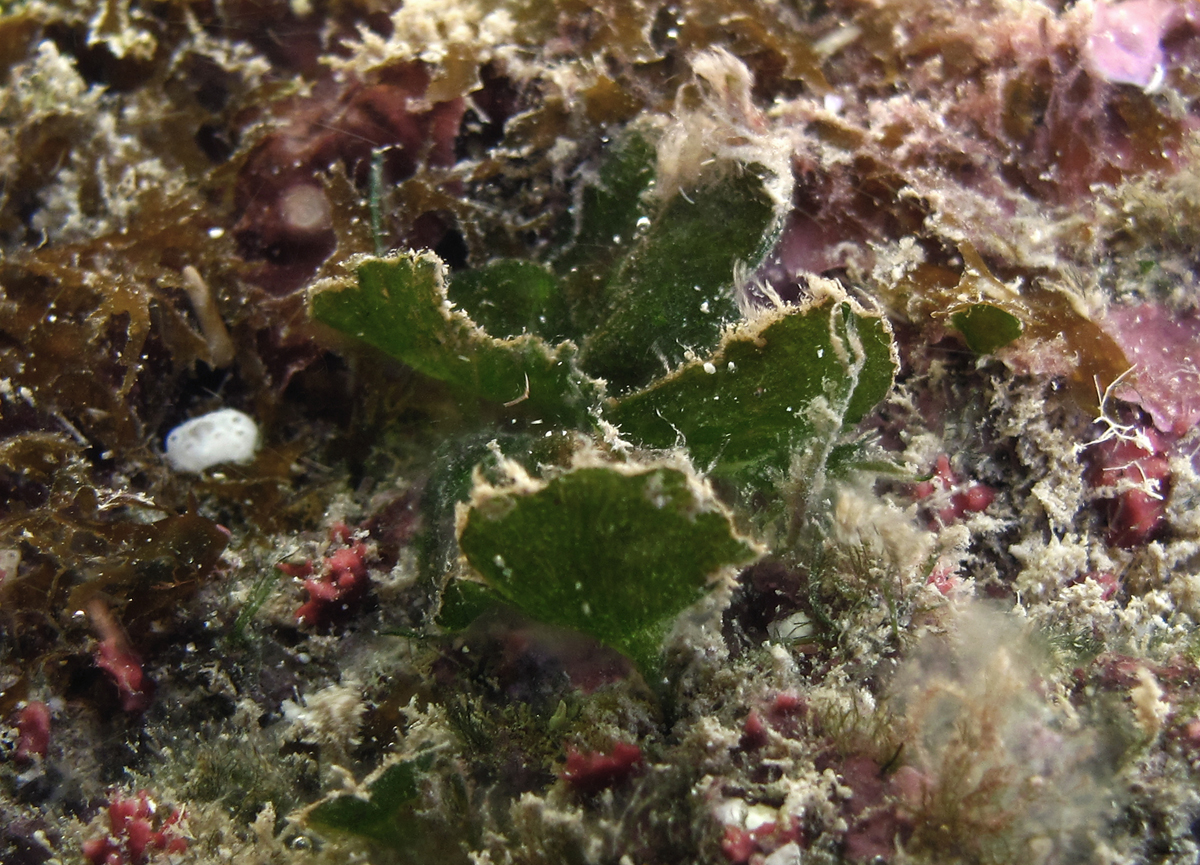
Avrainvillea algal species

Costasiella ocellifera is a strictly herbivorous sea slug that feeds almost exclusively on the algae species, Avrainvillea. The unique thing about this sea slug's eating habits is that they use their radula (teeth) to pierce into the algal cell wall, and suck out the cell content, including the functioning chloroplasts (hence the name "sap-sucking sea slugs"). After sucking out the algal cell content, they are able to incorporate the algal plastids into specialized cells within their digestive diverticula which allows them to become photosynthetic. This process is known as kleptoplasty. The word kleptoplasty is derived from the Greek word for thief, "Kleptes", which can be translated to mean "stolen plastids". By taking part in this process, these animals are able to establish a unique symbiosis with the algal plastids, known as photosymbiosis.

Kleptoplasty, is common amongst several species of sacoglossan sea slugs, however the "retention period" or the amount of time that an individual slug can survive off of photosynthesis alone, varies. Some sacoglossan species have non-retention (NR), meaning they are unable to incorporate the plastids and photosynthesize. Others have short-term retention (StR), meaning that these slugs can survive using photosynthesis for up to two weeks. Lastly there are the sea slugs, such as C. ocellifera, who have long-term retention (LtR), which means they can stay alive from one to several months solely on photosynthesis. It has been found that C. ocellifera can survive for up to 65 days on photosynthesis alone, but, it is unclear why there are these differences in the retention periods. However, it has been researched that the ability to perform photosynthesis is related to the specific plant/algal species consumed. Kleptoplasty is an evolutionary advantage because the sacoglossan slugs are able to choose which method of feeding they use, so if there is a shortage of algae the sea slugs can switch from active-feeding to photosynthesis. Although these slugs can photosynthesize, they are not photoautotrophic because the algal plastids are not passed from the parental slugs onto their offspring. Newly hatched sea slugs must feed on algae for a certain amount of time before they are able to photosynthesize.

== Reproduction ==
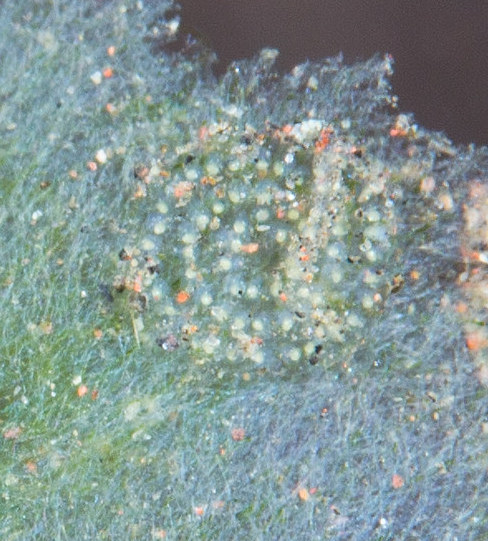
Costasiella egg spiral

This species of sea slug, along with all other sacoglossan species, are simultaneous hermaphrodites. This means they possess the reproductive organs of both sexes, and produce both types of gametes. They reproduce through internal fertilization, and then spawn their eggs in a unique spiral pattern onto the algae that they eat, Avrainvillea nigricans. This species is also unique because they have poecilogony larvae. This means that their larvae have two different types of development. In several studies it was shown that C. ocellifera can have both lecithotrophic (aplanktonic) and planktotrophic larval development. Lecithotrophic larvae feed from the egg reserves, such as the yolk sacs. Planktotrophic larvae, on the other hand, feed on plankton in the water column. For approximately a month after hatching, the planktotrophic larvae are free-swimming, while the lecithotrophic larvae go through their metamorphosis process while in their eggs. Eggs with smaller diameters normally indicate planktotrophic larval development.

== Phylogeny ==
This phylogram shows the results of a study based on the analysis of almost 3,000 base pairs of DNA from four genetic loci which suggest the following evolutionary relationships of the Costasiella species.

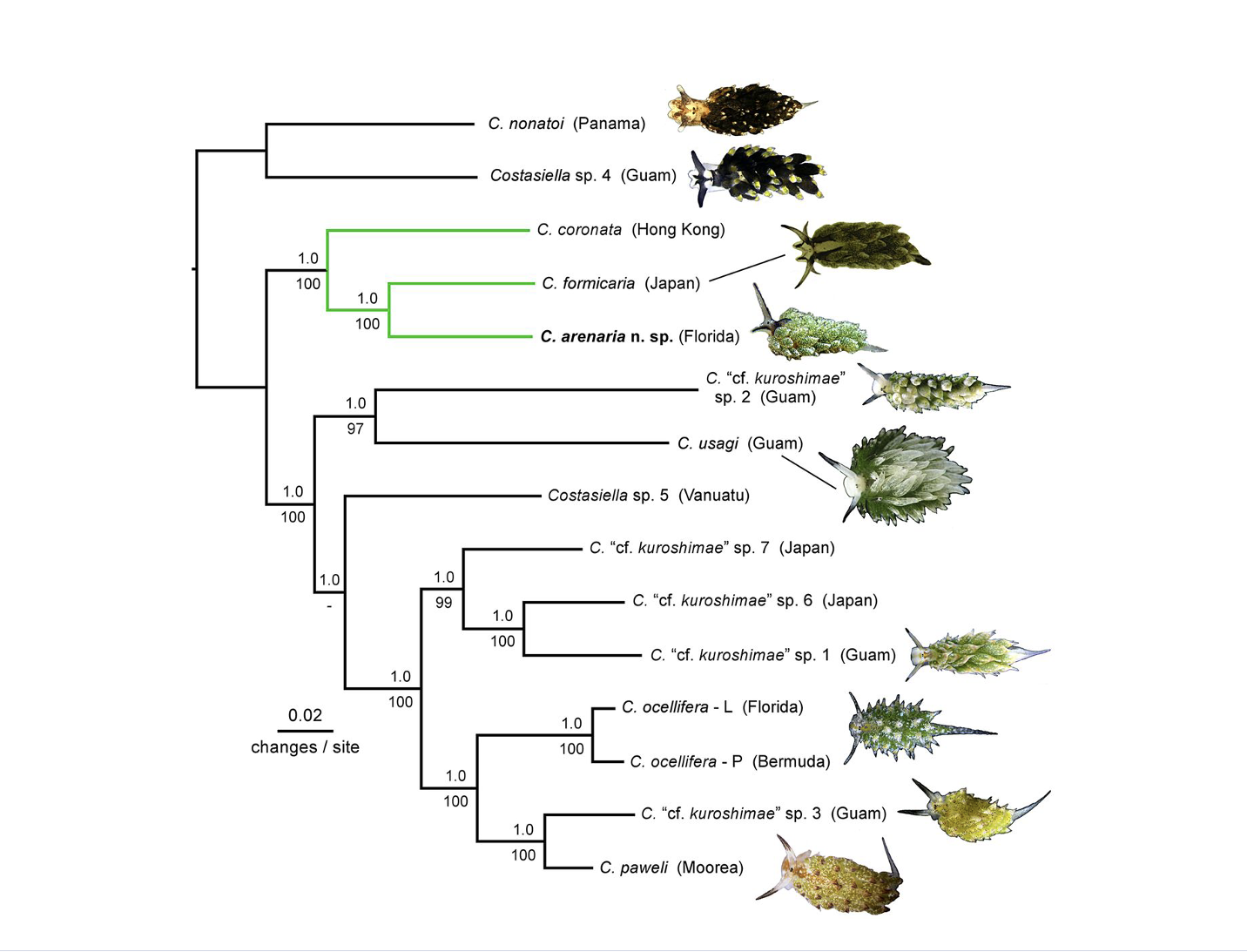
Evolutionary relationships among Costasiella species
