= Placida aoteana =

Scientific classification
- Kingdom: Animalia
- Phylum: Mollusca
- Class: Gastropoda
- Superorder: Sacoglossa
- Family: Limapontiidae
- Genus: Placida
- Species: P. aoteana

Binomial name
- Placida aoteana (Powell, 1937)

Synonyms
- Hermaea aoteana Powell, 1937

Species of gastropod

Placida aoteana is a species of small sea slug, a marine opisthobranch gastropod mollusk or micromollusk in the family Limapontiidae.
