= Ercolania irregularis =

Scientific classification
- Kingdom: Animalia
- Phylum: Mollusca
- Class: Gastropoda
- Superorder: Sacoglossa
- Family: Limapontiidae
- Genus: Ercolania
- Species: E. irregularis

Binomial name
- Ercolania irregularis (Eliot, 1904)

Species of gastropod

Ercolania irregularis is a species of sacoglossan sea slug, a shell-less marine opisthobranch gastropod mollusk in the family Limapontiidae.

In his 1904 paper, C. Eliot described ercolania irregularis "with posterior cerata which are twice as long as the front ones".
