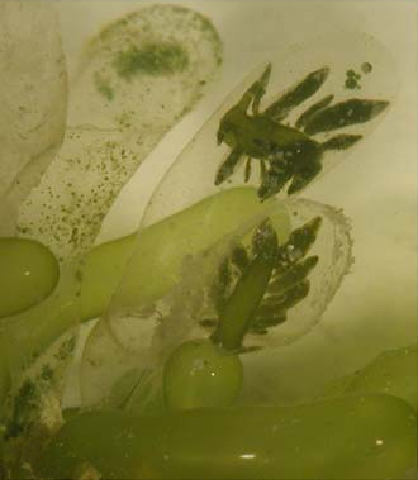
- Ercolania kencolesi inside the alga Boergesenia cf. forbesii.

Scientific classification
- Kingdom: Animalia
- Phylum: Mollusca
- Class: Gastropoda
- Superorder: Sacoglossa
- Family: Limapontiidae
- Genus: Ercolania; Trinchese, 1872

= Ercolania =

Genus of gastropods

Ercolania on filamentous algae

A close-up of Ercolania viridis

Ercolania is a genus of small sacoglossan sea slugs, shell-less marine opisthobranch gastropod mollusks in the family Limapontiidae.

== Species ==
Species within the genus Ercolania include 25 valid species:

- Ercolania annelyleorum Wagele, Stemmer, Burghardt & Handeler, 2010
- Ercolania boodleae (Baba, 1938)
- Ercolania coerulea Trinchese, 1892
- Ercolania endophytophaga K. R. Jensen, 1999
- Ercolania erbsus (Ev. Marcus & Er. Marcus, 1970)
- Ercolania evelinae (Marcus, 1959)
- Ercolania felina (Hutton, 1882)
- Ercolania fuscata (Gould, 1870)
- Ercolania gopalai (Rao, 1937)
- Ercolania gujaratensis (Nanda, Chatragadda & Dalvi, 2025)
- Ercolania halophilae K. R. Jensen, Kohnert, Bendell & Schrödl, 2014
- Ercolania irregularis (Eliot, 1904)
- Ercolania kencolesi Grzymbowski, Stemmer & Wagele, 2007
- Ercolania lozanoi Ortea, 1981
- Ercolania margaritae Burn, 1974
- Ercolania nigra (Lemche, 1936)
- Ercolania pica (Annandale & Prashad, 1922)
- Ercolania raorum (Marcus & Marcus, 1970)
- Ercolania selva Ortea & Espinosa, 2001
- Ercolania subviridis (Baba, 1959)
- Ercolania talis (Ev. Marcus & Er. Marcus, 1956)
- Ercolania tentaculata (Eliot, 1917)
- Ercolania translucens Jensen, 1993
- Ercolania varians (Eliot, 1904)
- Ercolania viridis (A. Costa, 1866)
- Ercolania zanzibarica Eliot, 1903

Species brought into synonymy include

- Ercolania costai Pruvot-Fol, 1951
- Ercolania cricetae (Marcus & Marcus, 1970)
- Ercolania emarginata Jensen, 1985
- Ercolania funerea (Costa, 1867)
- Ercolania nigrovittata (A. Costa, 1866)
- Ercolania nigrovittata (Rao & Rao, 1963)
- Ercolania pancerii Trinchese, 1872
- Ercolania siottii Trinchese, 1872
- Ercolania trinchesii Pruvot-Fol, 1951
- Ercolania uziellii Trinchese, 1872
- Ercolania vanellus Marcus, 1957
