= Nisha Ayub =

Malaysian transgender rights activist (born 1979)

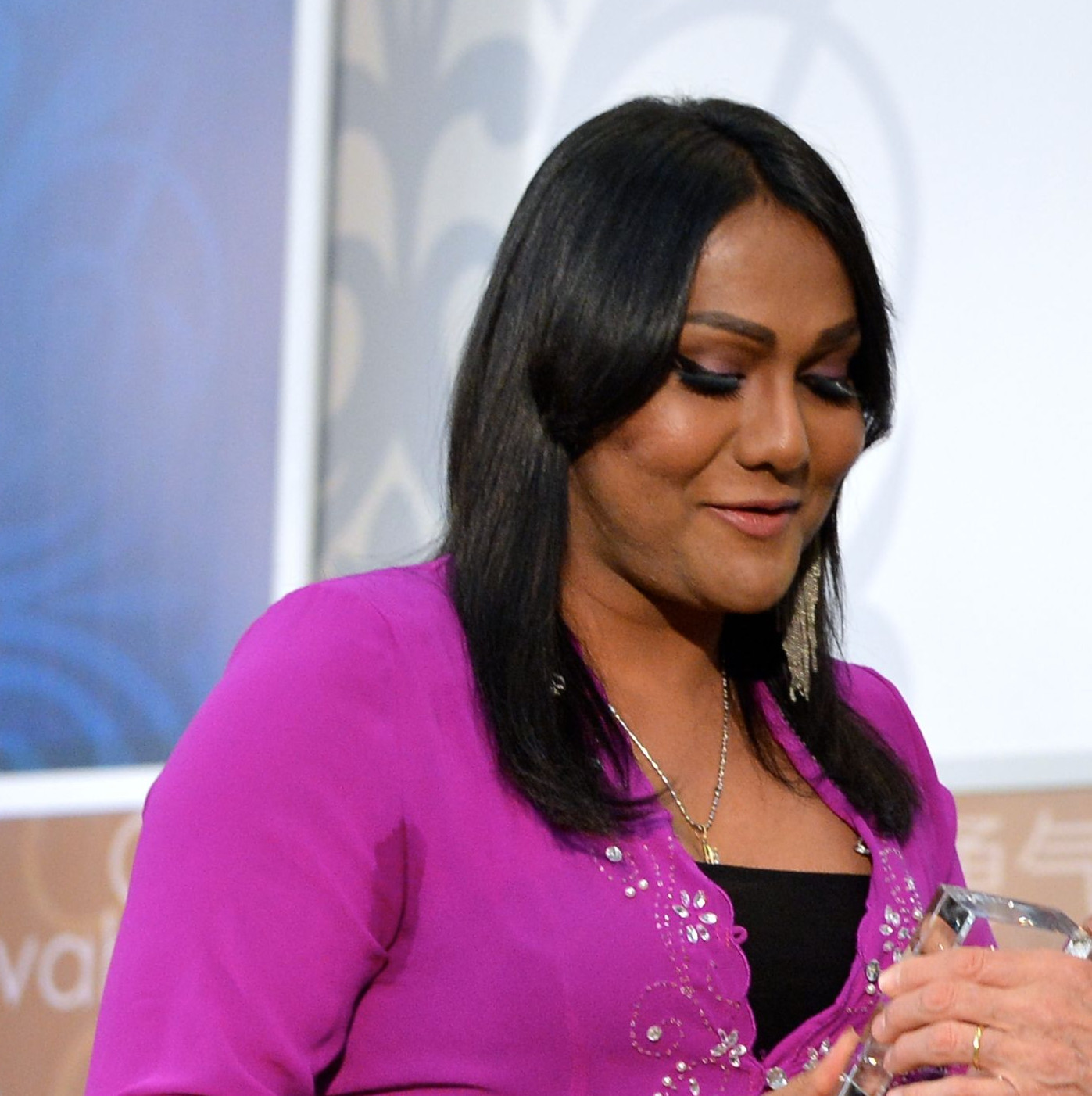
- Nisha Ayub receiving the 2016 International Women of Courage Award in Washington D.C.
- Born: 5 April 1979 (age 47); Malacca, Malaysia
- Occupation: Activist
- Known for: Transgender rights advocacy

Nisha Ayub (born 5 April 1979) is a Malaysian transgender rights activist. Ayub is the co-founder of the community-run SEED Foundation and transgender grassroots campaign Justice for Sisters and she was awarded the prestigious International Women of Courage Award in 2016.

== Early life ==
Nisha Ayub was born in Malacca, Malaysia, on April 5, 1979. She is of mixed maternal Indian, Ceylonese and paternal Malay descent. Nisha has memories of when she was a child and used to wear a “selendang” (shawl) while dancing to Bollywood songs. Nisha was raised by her mother Christian family after her father's death when she was six years old. Her mother is a Muslim convert. At nine years old, Nisha participated in a fancy dress competition, as a ballerina wearing a black dress and a wig. At the time, she realized that was the real Nisha.

== Biography ==
As a transgender woman, Nisha has faced law enforcement where Islamic sharia laws are enforced. Under a provision of Sharia (Islamic law) a male person is prohibited from dressing or behaving like a woman and appearing in public that way. Violation of this is punishable by a fine of 1,000 ringgit (approximately US$257) and a jail term for period of six months to a year. Sharia law is enforced by the state Islamic religious departments. Under this law, Ayub was imprisoned for three months in 2000. While Nisha was imprisoned in a male prison, the warden and other prisoners sexually assaulted her. Ayub said of her time in the prison: "They asked me to strip naked in front of everyone. They made fun of me, because my body doesn’t conform to what men and women are supposed to be.”

Ayub, through non-governmental organizations, counsels people, provides training to develop professional careers, addresses their health and welfare issues and provides them legal support.

== Legacy ==
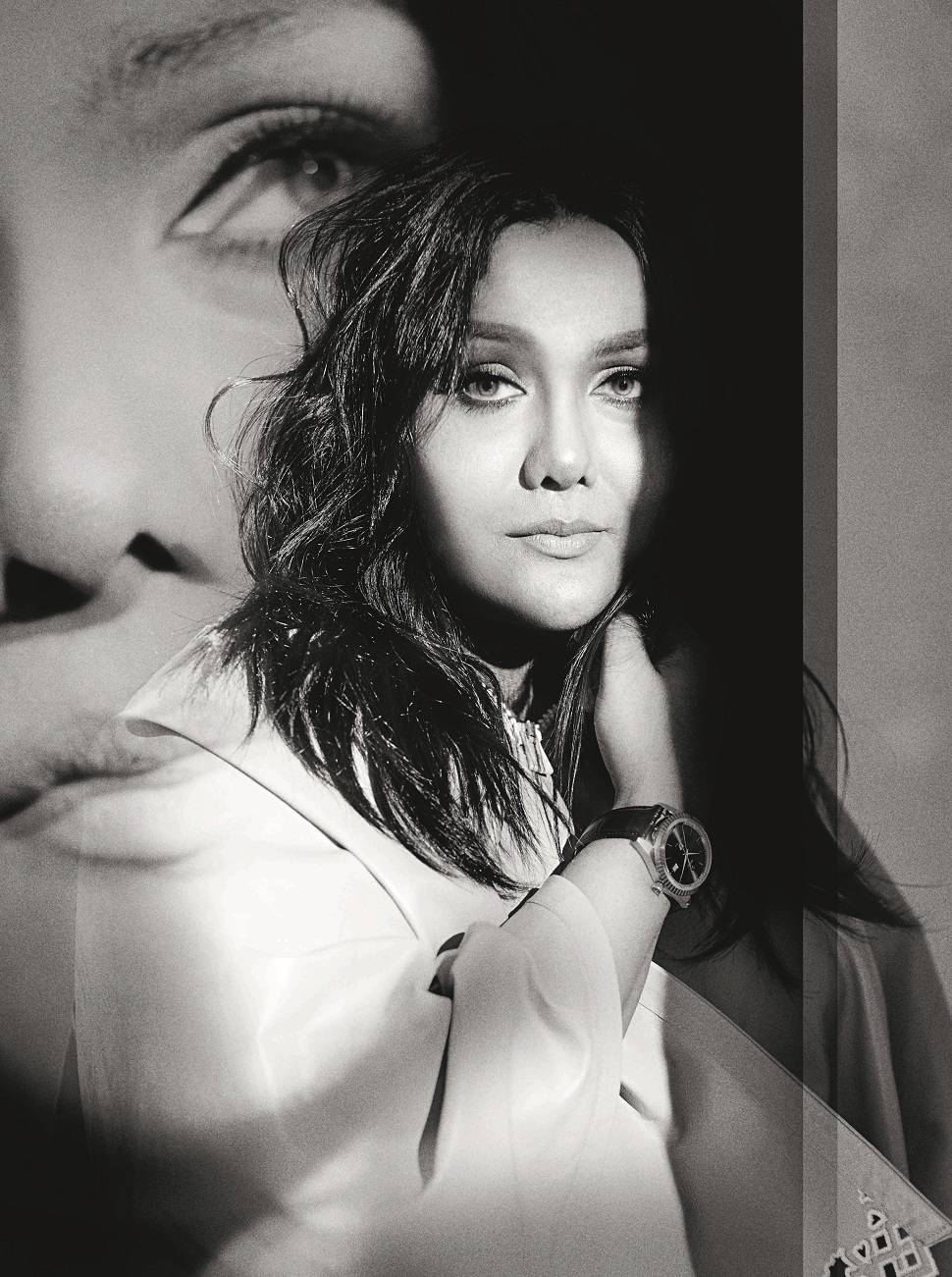
Nisha Ayub by Richard Gray

Nisha Ayub was honored with Human Rights Watch's Alison Des Forges Award for Extraordinary Activism in 2015 for her bold action opposing the Malaysian laws that were detrimental to the interest of people to live in peace without being harmed and oppressed. She also received the International Women of Courage Award in 2016, becoming the first openly transgender woman to receive that award.

In 2016, San Diego declared April 5 to be Nisha Ayub Day in the US city. In the proclamation, San Diego mayor Kevin L. Faulconer said: "Nisha Ayub continues to fight for the equality and protection of all people in her country and beyond its borders."

In 2018, a senior lecturer in the Faculty of Agriculture of University Putra Malaysia, Leena Wong alongside lead study author Patrick Krug from California State University, Los Angeles, discovered a new species of sea slug that camouflages itself as seaweed, and upon confirmation that it was indeed a new species, named it Sacoproteus nishae after Nisha. The sea slug was named so due to its ability to camouflage itself after seaweed calling "it the best example of an animal masquerading as a plant".

In 2019, Nisha became the only Malaysian on the British Broadcasting Corporation (BBC) 100 Women of 2019 list. She was recognised by BBC for her work in assisting the local transgender community.

=== Awards and accolades ===
Year	Organization	Award	Reference
2015
2015	Human Rights Watch	Alison Des Forges Award for Extraordinary Activism	
2016	United States Department of State	International Women of Courage Award	
2019	BBC	BBC 100 Women of 2019	
