= Calliopaea =

Scientific classification
- Kingdom: Animalia
- Phylum: Mollusca
- Class: Gastropoda
- Family: Limapontiidae
- Genus: Calliopaea d'Orbigny, 1837

Type species
- Calliopaea bellula d'Orbigny, 1837

Synonyms
- Calliopea [sic] (misspelling); Custiphorus Deshayes, 1853

Genus of gastropods

Calliopaea is a genus of sea slugs, marine gastropod molluscs in the family Limapontiidae. These are sacoglossan sea slugs.

== Description ==
(Original description in French) The animal is soft and contractile, with an elongated, slug-like body. The head is little distinct and bears no tentacles, but has two very long buccal appendages. The eyes are situated on the upper middle part of the body and are set fairly far apart from one another. The mouth forms a transverse slit at the anterior extremity of the foot. The gills are composed of pear-shaped bodies arranged in longitudinal rows along each side of the back. The opening of the reproductive organs lies on the right side, beneath the first branchial lobes. The foot is narrow, pointed posteriorly, and often provided with anterior lateral expansions. There is no distinct mantle.

== Species ==
Species within the genus Calliopaea include:

- Calliopaea bellula d'Orbigny, 1837
- Calliopaea pusilla (Baba, 1968)

Taxa inquirenda

- Calliopaea oophaga Lemche in Gascoigne & Sartory, 1974 (taxon inquirendum)
- Calliopaea rissoana Milne-Edwards, 1842 (taxon inquirendum)
- Calliopaea souleyeti Vérany, 1846 (taxon inquirendum)

Synonyms

- Calliopaea dendritica Alder & Hancock, 1843: synonym of Placida dendritica (Alder & Hancock, 1843) (superseded combination)
- Calliopaea felina F. W. Hutton, 1882: synonym of Ercolania felina (F. W. Hutton, 1882) (superseded combination)
- Calliopaea fuscata A. A. Gould, 1870: synonym of Ercolania fuscata (A. A. Gould, 1870) (superseded combination)
