= Mesodinium chamaeleon =

Scientific classification
- Domain: Eukaryota
- Clade: Sar
- Clade: Alveolata
- Phylum: Ciliophora
- Class: Litostomatea
- Order: Cyclotrichiida
- Family: Mesodiniidae
- Genus: Mesodinium
- Species: M. chamaeleon

Binomial name
- Mesodinium chamaeleon Moestrup, Garcia-Cuetos, Hansen & Fenchel, 2012

Species of single-celled organism

Mesodinium chamaeleon is a ciliate of the genus Mesodinium. It is known for being able to consume and maintain algae endosymbiotically for days before digesting the algae. It has the ability to eat red and green algae, and afterwards using the chlorophyll granules from the algae to generate energy, turning itself from being a heterotroph into an autotroph. The species was discovered in January 2012 outside the coast of Nivå, Denmark by professor Øjvind Moestrup.

In contrast to certain other species of the genus, Mesodinium chamaeleon can be maintained in culture for short periods only. It captures and ingests flagellates including cryptomonads. The prey is ingested very rapidly into a food vacuole without the cryptomonad flagella being shed and the trichocysts being discharged. The individual food vacuoles subsequently serve as photosynthetic units, each containing the cryptomonad chloroplast, a nucleus, and some mitochondria. The ingested cells are eventually digested. This type of symbiosis differs from other plastid-bearing Mesodinium spp. Among the strains that belong to Mesodinium rubrum, they are known for causing red tides in many coastal ecosystems. Although one of them denominated as M. rubrum is known as a non-toxic species, ciliate blooms can be potentially harmful to aquaculture industries. M. rubrum performs photosynthesis by sequestering the nucleus of its cryptophytic prey, in order to keep the plastids and other stolen organelles. By this, the retained ingested cryptomonad cells remain almost intact. The food strategy of M. chamaeleon appears to be intermediate between heterotrophic species, such as Mesodinium pulex and Mesodinium pupula, and species with red cryptomonad endosymbionts, such as Mesodinium rubrum.
