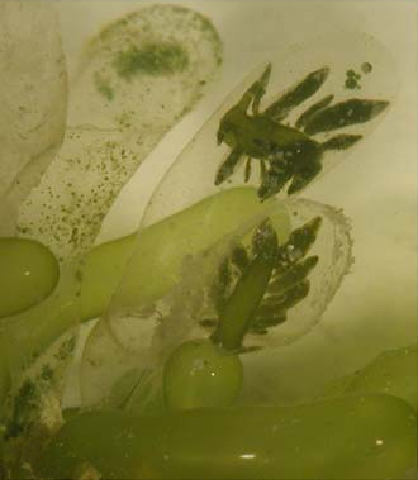
- Ercolania kencolesi inside of Boergesenia cf. forbesii. Locality: Lizard Island, Great Barrier Reef. The length of the slug is about 0.5 cm.

Scientific classification
- Kingdom: Animalia
- Phylum: Mollusca
- Class: Gastropoda
- Superorder: Sacoglossa
- Family: Limapontiidae
- Genus: Ercolania
- Species: E. kencolesi

Binomial name
- Ercolania kencolesi Grzymbowski, Stemmer & Wagele, 2007

= Ercolania kencolesi =

Species of gastropod

Ercolania kencolesi is a species of sacoglossan sea slug, a shell-less marine opisthobranch gastropod mollusk in the family Limapontiidae.

This sea slug lives on the alga Boergesenia forbesii and also within its tubes. It also feed on this alga.
