= Ercolania zanzibarica =

Scientific classification
- Kingdom: Animalia
- Phylum: Mollusca
- Class: Gastropoda
- Superorder: Sacoglossa
- Family: Limapontiidae
- Genus: Ercolania
- Species: E. zanzibarica

Binomial name
- Ercolania zanzibarica Eliot, 1903

Species of gastropod

Ercolania zanzibarica is a species of sacoglossan sea slug, a shell-less marine opisthobranch gastropod mollusk in the family Limapontiidae.

Charles Eliot caught two specimens at Chuaka, on the eastern coast of Zanzibar, in February 1901.
