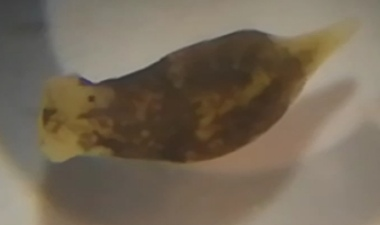
- Limapontia capitata

Scientific classification
- Kingdom: Animalia
- Phylum: Mollusca
- Class: Gastropoda
- Family: Limapontiidae
- Genus: Limapontia
- Species: L. capitata

Binomial name
- Limapontia capitata (O. F. Müller, 1774)

Synonyms
- Fasciola capitata O. F. Müller, 1774; Chalidis coerulea Quatrefages, 1844; Limapontia nigra Johnston, 1836; Pontolimax varians Meyer & Möbius, 1865

= Limapontia capitata =

Species of gastropod

Limapontia capitata is a species of sacoglossan sea slug, a shell-less marine opisthobranch gastropod mollusk in the family Limapontiidae.

Limapontia capitata ocuurs on the coasts of the northeastern Atlantic Ocean, including the Baltic Sea, and the Mediterranean Sea.

The type locality is the Baltic Sea.

== Taxonomy ==
According to Pruvot-Fol (1954) and Abbott (1974) this species should be named as Limopontia nigra (Müller, 1773). Other authors however prefer the name Limopontia capitata (Müller, 1774) and then Limopontia nigra Johnston, 1836 should be regarded a synonym of Limopontia capitata.

In contrast to Pruvot-Fol (1954), but according to Thompson (1976), Gascoigne (1978), McKay & Smith (1979) and Cattaneo & Barletta (1984) Limopontia capitata and Limopontia depressa are considered as two separate species.
