= Costasiella coronata =

Scientific classification
- Domain: Eukaryota
- Kingdom: Animalia
- Phylum: Mollusca
- Class: Gastropoda
- Family: Costasiellidae
- Genus: Costasiella
- Species: C. coronata

Binomial name
- Costasiella coronata Swennen, 2007

Species of gastropod

Costasiella coronata is a species of sacoglossan sea slug, a shell-less marine opisthobranch gastropod mollusk in the family Costasiellidae.

== Distribution ==
The type locality for this species is mangrove forest in Bang Tawa, southern Thailand. The type specimen (holotype) is stored in the Zoological Reference Collection of the Raffles Museum of Biodiversity Research, National University of Singapore. The three paratypes are stored in the Zoological Museum, University of Amsterdam.

== Description ==
Slugs are from yellowish brown to bright green in color, when they are well fed. There are also color (blue-green, white, yellowish, red-brown) dots on the skin. The body length is from 4 to 10.5 mm. Its cerata are flattened and this is the difference from other species in the genus. The renal shield is large and cover 2/3 of the body when the slug is fully extended. Rhinophores are smooth. Genital apertures are on the right side of the head. The male aperture and vaginal aperture are below the right rhinophore; the oviductal aperture is a bit below them.

== Habitat ==
These are amphibious slugs living in the intertidal zone. They are found on mud or on Vaucheria algae. They are found in higher density on Vaucheria when the algae is above the sea water level.

== Feeding habits ==
This species feeds on Vaucheria. The other species of Costasiella which is known to feed on Vaucheria is Costasiella palida.

== Life cycle ==
Costasiella coronata is a hermaphroditic species. Mating occurs in the water. Eggs are in egg capsules forming prolonged egg-strings in dimensions 9–15 mm × 1.7 mm containing from 2000 to 4000 eggs. A single egg has dimension about 61 μm. The free swimming veliger hatches from eggs after 4 days. Then veliger then undergoes a metamorphosis into a slug.
