= Ercolania varians =

Scientific classification
- Kingdom: Animalia
- Phylum: Mollusca
- Class: Gastropoda
- Superorder: Sacoglossa
- Family: Limapontiidae
- Genus: Ercolania
- Species: E. varians

Binomial name
- Ercolania varians (Eliot, 1904)

Species of gastropod

Ercolania varians is a species of sacoglossan sea slug, a shell-less marine opisthobranch gastropod mollusk in the family Limapontiidae.

In 1904, Charles Eliot described ercolania varians as "brilliant green" with "numerous lines of deeper color" that could be digestive gland branches.
