= Karyoklepty =

Karyoklepty (/ˌkæriˈoʊklɛpti/ KARR-ee-OH-klep-tee) is a strategy for cellular evolution, whereby a predator cell appropriates the nucleus of a cell from another organism to supplement its own biochemical capabilities.

In the related process of kleptoplasty, the predator sequesters plastids (especially chloroplasts) from dietary algae. The chloroplasts can still photosynthesize, but do not last long after the prey's cells are metabolised. If the predator can also sequester cell nuclei from the prey to encode proteins for the plastids, it can sustain them. Karyoklepty is this sequestration of nuclei; even after sequestration, the nuclei are still capable of transcription.

Johnson et al. described and named karyoklepty in 2007 after observing it in the ciliate species Mesodinium rubrum. Karyoklepty is a Greek compound of the words karydi ("kernel") and kleftis ("thief").

== See also ==
- Endosymbiont
