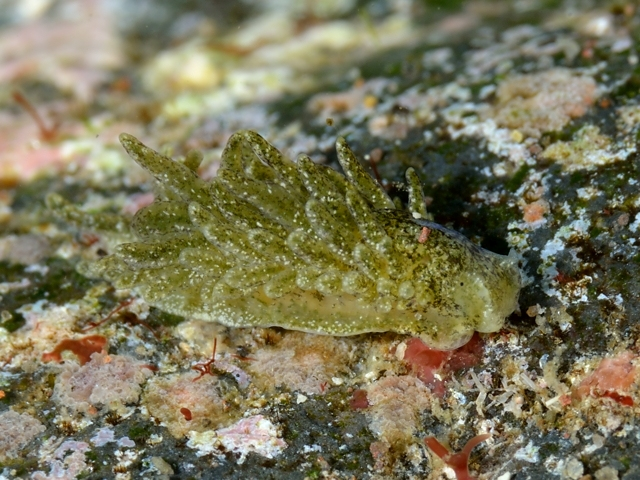
- Alderia modesta

Scientific classification
- Domain: Eukaryota
- Kingdom: Animalia
- Phylum: Mollusca
- Class: Gastropoda
- Family: Limapontiidae
- Genus: Alderia; George Allman, 1846

= Alderia =

Genus of gastropods

Alderia is a genus of sea slugs, marine gastropod mollusks in the family Limapontiidae. These are sacoglossan sea slugs.

The name Alderia first appeared in Thompson's 1844 Report on the fauna of Ireland as a nomen nudum (Allmann MSS).

== Species ==
Species within the genus Alderia include:

- Alderia modesta (Lovén, 1844)
- Alderia uda (Ev. Marcus & Er. Marcus, 1956)
- Alderia willowi Krug, Ellingson, Burton & Valdés, 2007
