= Ercolania tentaculata =

Scientific classification
- Kingdom: Animalia
- Phylum: Mollusca
- Class: Gastropoda
- Superorder: Sacoglossa
- Family: Limapontiidae
- Genus: Ercolania
- Species: E. tentaculata

Binomial name
- Ercolania tentaculata (Eliot, 1917)

Species of gastropod

Ercolania tentaculata is a species of sacoglossan sea slug, a shell-less marine opisthobranch gastropod mollusk in the family Limapontiidae. It is estuarine.
