= Panderevela =

Scientific classification
- Domain: Eukaryota
- Kingdom: Animalia
- Phylum: Mollusca
- Class: Gastropoda
- Superorder: Sacoglossa
- Superfamily: Plakobranchoidea
- Family: Costasiellidae
- Genus: Panderevela; Moro & Ortea, 2015

Type species
- Panderevela dacilae Moro & Ortea, 2015

Genus of gastropods

Panderevela is a genus of sacoglossan sea slugs, a shell-less marine opisthobranchi gastropod mollusks in the family Costasiellidae.

== Species ==
- Panderevela dacilae Moro & Ortea, 2015
- Panderevela hyllebergi K. R. Jensen, 2021
- Panderevela ipse Ortea, Moro & Espinosa, 2015
