= Olea (gastropod) =

Scientific classification
- Kingdom: Animalia
- Phylum: Mollusca
- Class: Gastropoda
- Family: Limapontiidae
- Genus: Olea; Agersborg, 1923

Genus of molluscs

Olea is a genus of mollusks belonging to the family Limapontiidae.

The species of this genus are found in Europe and Northern America.

Species:

- Olea hansineensis Agersborg, 1923
- Olea hensoni Filho, Paulay & Krug, 2019
