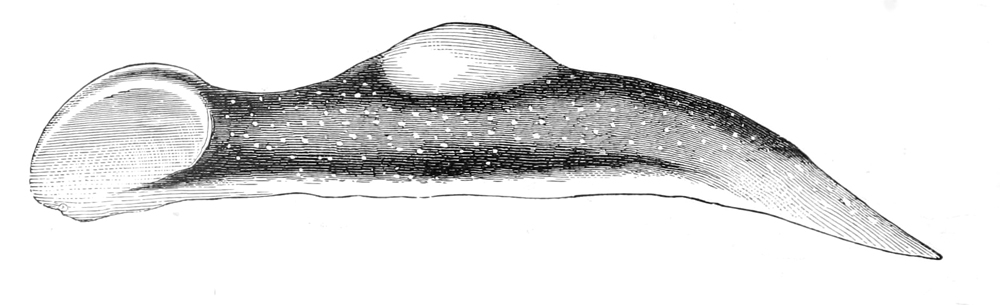
- Limapontia capitata

Scientific classification
- Domain: Eukaryota
- Kingdom: Animalia
- Phylum: Mollusca
- Class: Gastropoda
- Family: Limapontiidae
- Genus: Limapontia; Johnston, 1836

= Limapontia =

Genus of sea slugs

Limapontia is a genus of sea slugs, minute marine gastropods belonging to the family Limapontiidae.

The species of this genus are found in Europe.

Species:

- Limapontia capitata (Müller, 1774)
- Limapontia depressa Alder & Hancock, 1862
- Limapontia senestra (Quatrefages, 1844)
