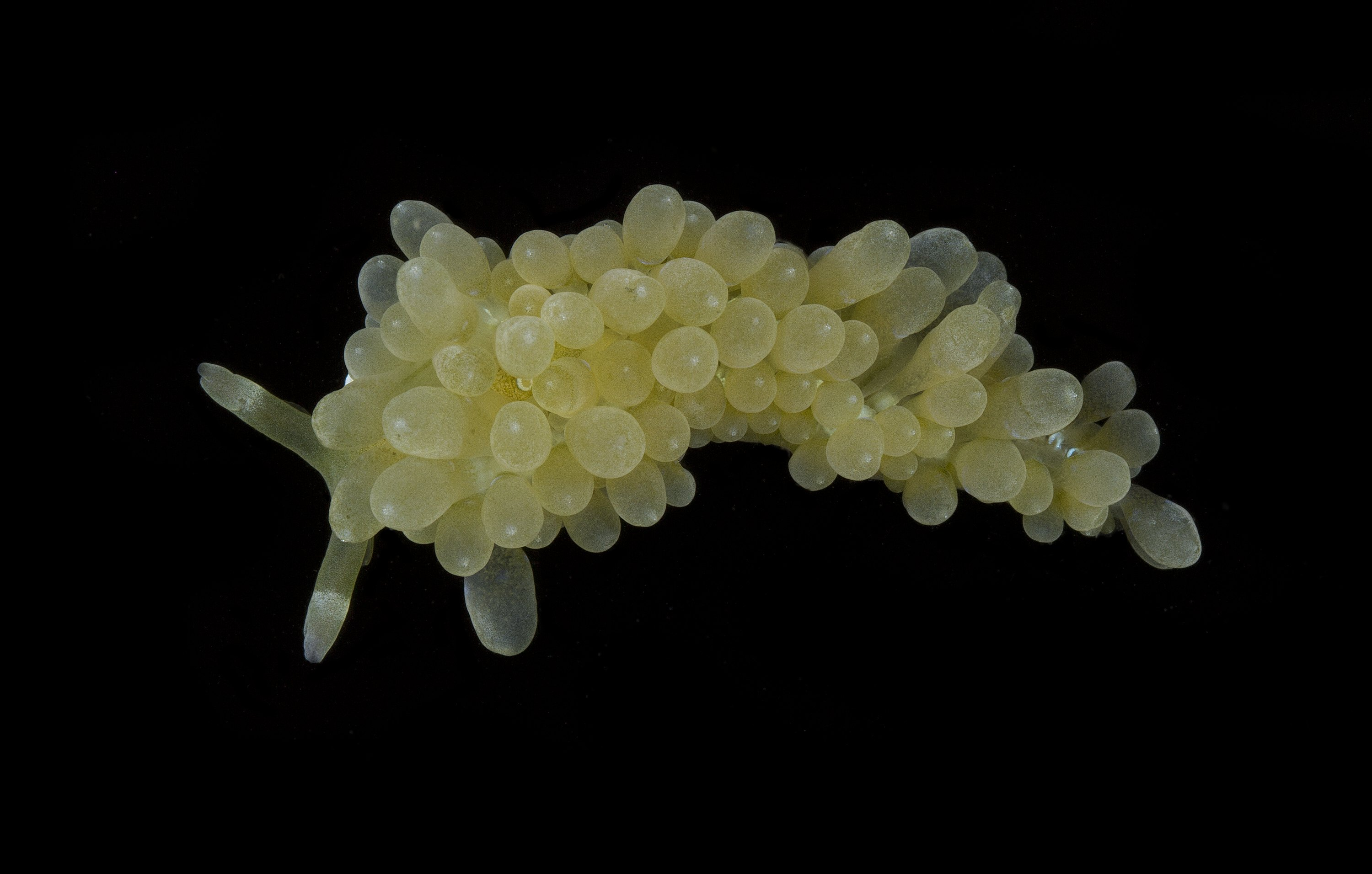
- Sacoproteus yhiae, collected at Bunurong Marine National Park, Australia

Scientific classification
- Domain: Eukaryota
- Kingdom: Animalia
- Phylum: Mollusca
- Class: Gastropoda
- Family: Limapontiidae
- Genus: Sacoproteus; Krug et al. 2018

Species
- Sacoproteus smaragdinus; Sacoproteus nishae; Sacoproteus yhiae; Sacoproteus browni; Sacoproteus thomasleei

= Sacoproteus =

Genus of gastropods

Sacoproteus is a genus of sea slugs in the Limapontiidae family, described in 2018. It contains five species, of which four were newly described when the genus was erected, and one (Sacoproteus smaragdinus) was reassigned from its previous classification of Stiliger smaragdinus as the type species of the new genus. Most of the species are mimetic of toxic "sea-grape" algae in the genus Caulerpa.

== Species ==
The species of the genus were found to closely mimic the appearance of different types of toxic algae that they feed on.

- Sacoproteus smaragdinus (previously classified as Stiliger smaragdinus): mimics Caulerpa racemosa and Caulerpa lentilifera
- Sacoproteus nishae: mimics Caulerpa chemnitzia
- Sacoproteus yhiae: mimics Caulerpa cactoides and Caulerpa gemminata
- Sacoproteus browni: probably as S. yhiae
- Sacoproteus thomasleei: not mimetic
