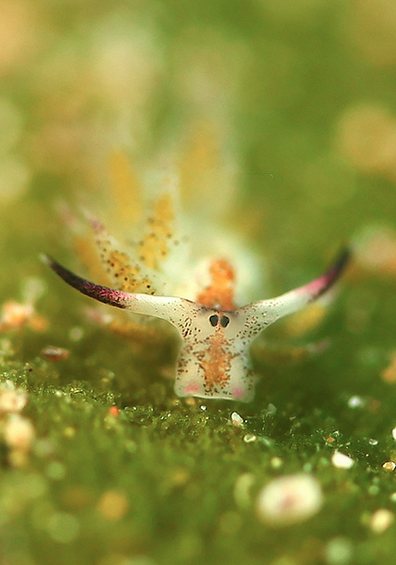
- Taken in Anilao, Philippines

Scientific classification
- Kingdom: Animalia
- Phylum: Mollusca
- Class: Gastropoda
- Superorder: Sacoglossa
- Family: Costasiellidae
- Genus: Costasiella
- Species: C. kuroshimae

Binomial name
- Costasiella kuroshimae Ichikawa, 1993
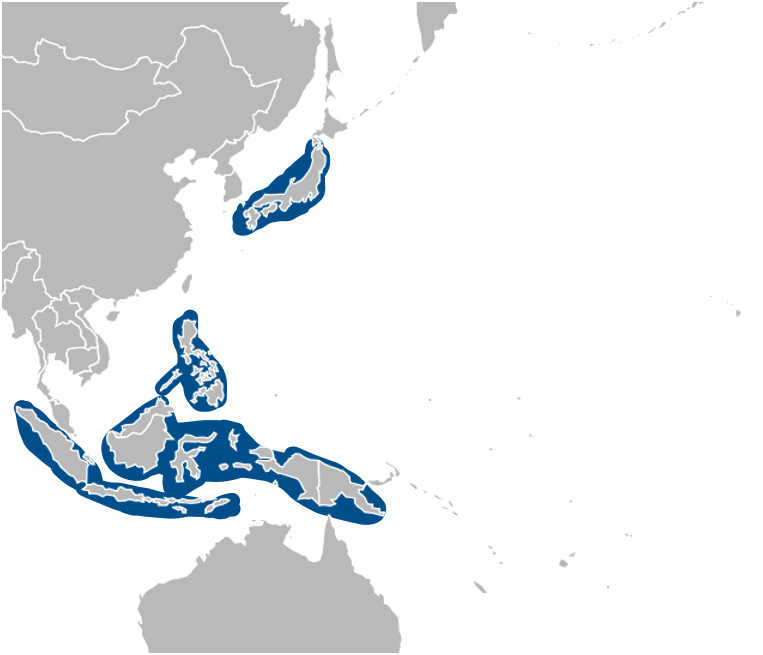

= Costasiella kuroshimae =

Species of mollusc (sea slug)

Costasiella kuroshimae (also known as a leaf slug, sea sheep, or leaf sheep) is a species of sacoglossan sea slug. Costasiella kuroshimae are shell-less marine opisthobranch gastropod mollusks in the family Costasiellidae. Despite being animals, they perform photosynthesis, via kleptoplasty.

== Description ==
Discovered in 1993 off the coast of the Japanese island Kuroshima, Costasiella kuroshimae have been found in the waters near Japan, the Philippines, and Indonesia. They live in tropical climates. The type locality is Kuroshima, Taketomi, Okinawa, Ryukyu Islands.

They have two dark eyes and two rhinophores that emerge from the tops of their heads that look similar to sheep's ears or insect antennae. They range in size from 5 to 10 mm (1/4 to 3/8 inch) in length. Their leaf-like appearance is credited to the cerata featured in rows across their body. These cerata contain digestive glands that assist the Costasiella kuroshimae in obtaining and storing food. They also aid in defense and respiration.

The species are simultaneous hermaphrodites having both male and female reproductive organs. They lay their eggs in tiny spiral ribbons on algae.

Costasiella kuroshimae are capable of a physiological process called kleptoplasty, in which they retain the chloroplasts from the algae they feed on. Absorbing the chloroplasts from algae enables them to perform photosynthesis.

Costasiella kuroshimae is a selective feeder of algae from the genus Avrainvillea, from which it sequesters chloroplasts into its own cells, retaining them for short-term photosynthesis. Even in the absence of active photosynthesis, chloroplasts provide a nutrient storage or "larder" that facilitates the survival of the slug without food for an extended period of time.

The leaf sheep was voted the 2026 winner of The Guardian's invertebrate of the year competition.

== Gallery ==
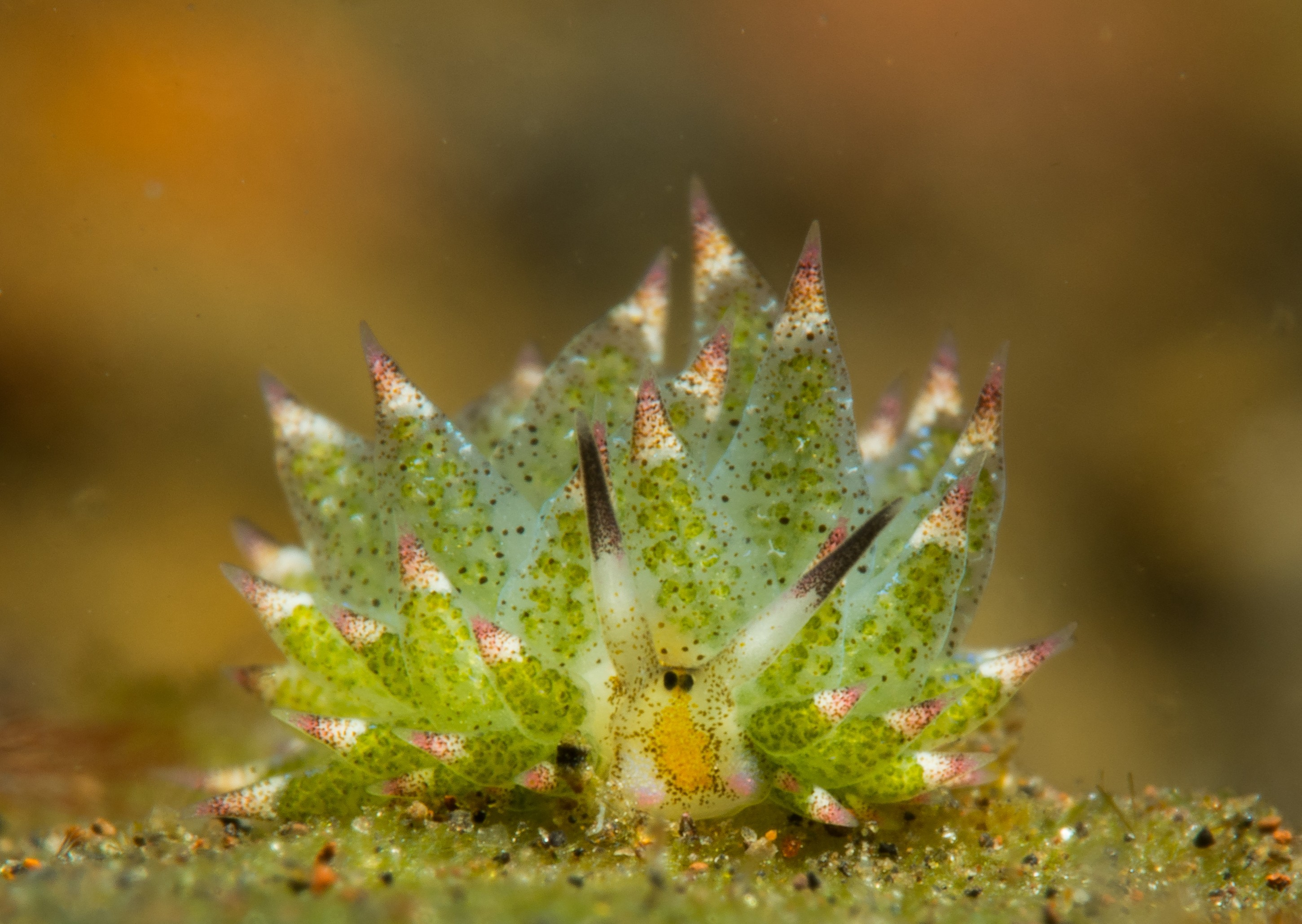
A frontal picture of a Costasiella kuroshimae.

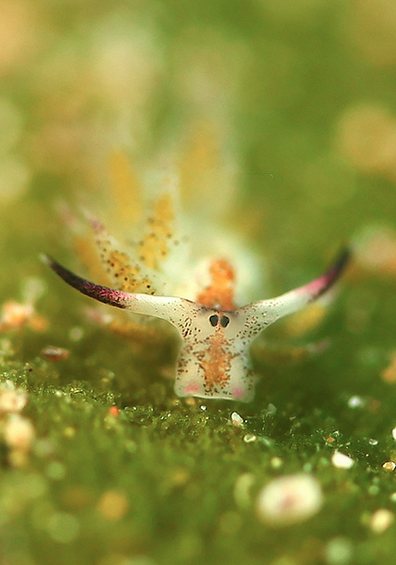
Costasiella kuroshimae taken in Secret Bay Anilao dive site, Batangas, Philippines

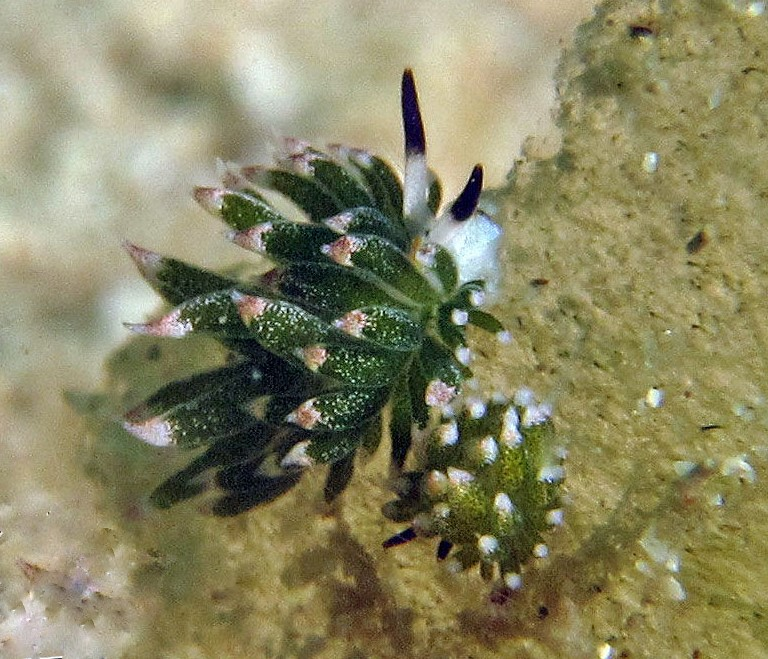
Costasiella kuroshimae at Koh Phangan, 2014

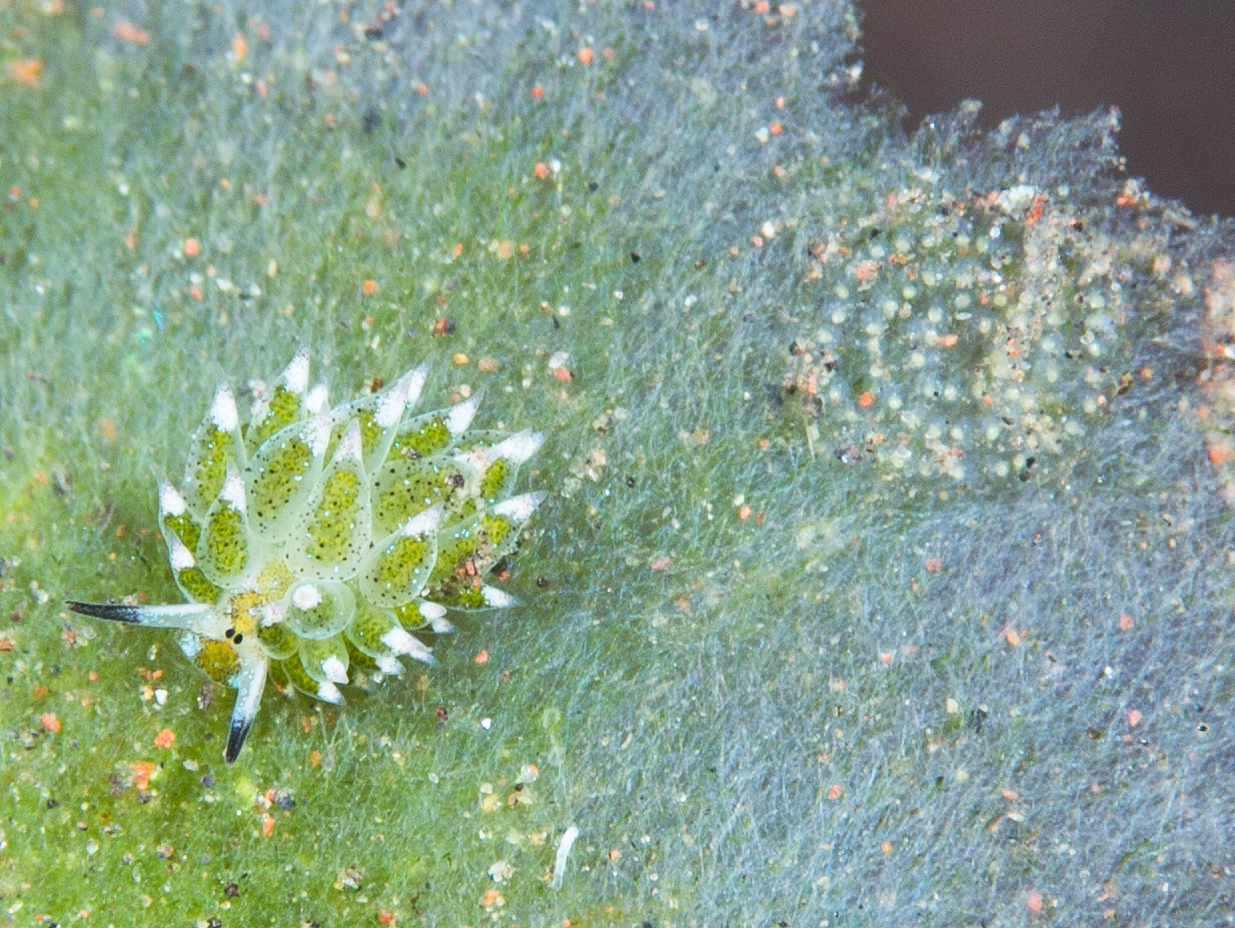
Costasiella kuroshimae at Bali, Indonesia.

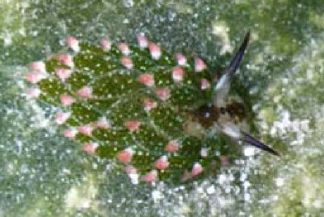
Costasiella cf. kuroshimae on Avrainvillea erecta. Locality: Lizard Island, Great Barrier Reef. The length of the slug is about 1 cm (3/8 in).
