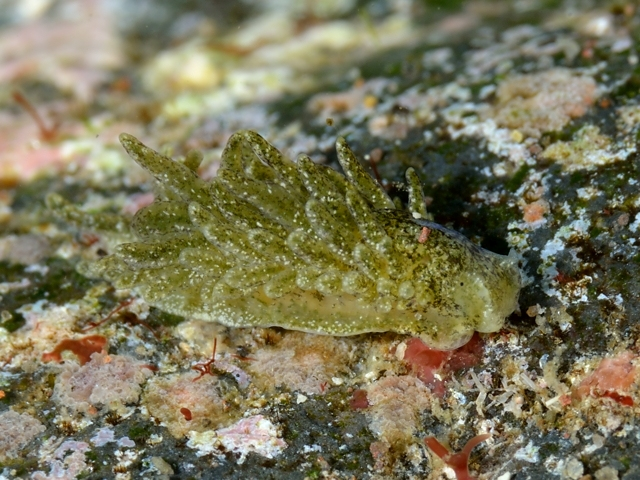

Scientific classification
- Kingdom: Animalia
- Phylum: Mollusca
- Class: Gastropoda
- Superorder: Sacoglossa
- Family: Limapontiidae
- Genus: Alderia
- Species: A. modesta

Binomial name
- Alderia modesta (Lovén, 1844)

Synonyms
- Alderia amphibia Allman, 1845; Alderia harvardiensis Gould, 1870; Alderia scaldiana Nyst, 1855; Canthopsis harvardiana Agassiz, 1850; Stiliger amphibius Allman, 1845; Stiliger modestus Lovén, 1844; Stiliger scaldianus (Nyst, 1855)

= Alderia modesta =

Species of gastropod

Alderia modesta is a species of sea slug, a marine gastropod mollusc in the family Limapontiidae. It is found in estuarine habitats and saltmarshes on either side of the North Atlantic and the North Pacific Oceans.

== Description ==
Alderia. modesta grows to a length of about 10 mm (0.4 in) when fully expanded. The foot is broader than the body, and the sides and upper surface, apart for the front third, are covered with cerata (finger-like outgrowths). In young individuals these are organised in up to seven rows, but in adults, the rows are no longer apparent. The anus is set on a papilla on the upper surface near the rear. The integument is translucent, and the branching gut and digestive gland can be seen through the cerata and the surface of the foot. The cerata are involved in respiration and pulsate regularly; this helps move the blood around the body, there being no heart in this genus. The general colour of this sea slug is pale fawn, blotched with brown, green and white.

== Distribution and habitat ==
The range includes both sides of the North Atlantic; in Western Europe its range extends from Norway to France and in North America, from Newfoundland to New York State. It also occurs on the Pacific coast of North America from British Columbia to California and in northeastern Asia where it is present in Peter the Great Gulf and the Yellow Sea. Its habitat is tidal saltmarshes and estuaries.

== Ecology ==
A euryhaline species, A. modesta is able to tolerate a wide range of salinities. It is nearly always associated with the yellow-green alga Vaucheria litorea on which it feeds in saltmarshes.

Its eyesight is poor and in order to breed, individuals probably locate each other by smell and touch. Having found a partner, they push against each other and probe each other with their oral tentacles. They then each extend their penis, which is armed with a sharp stylet, and push this through the body wall of the partner and transfer sperm by hypodermic injection. The gonad occupies most of the body interior, and the injection can be anywhere on the body wall. Reciprocal injections usually take place at the same time, especially in larger individuals. These sea slugs are able to transfer sperm in this way within two days of metamorphosis when only 0.5 mm (0.02 in) long.
