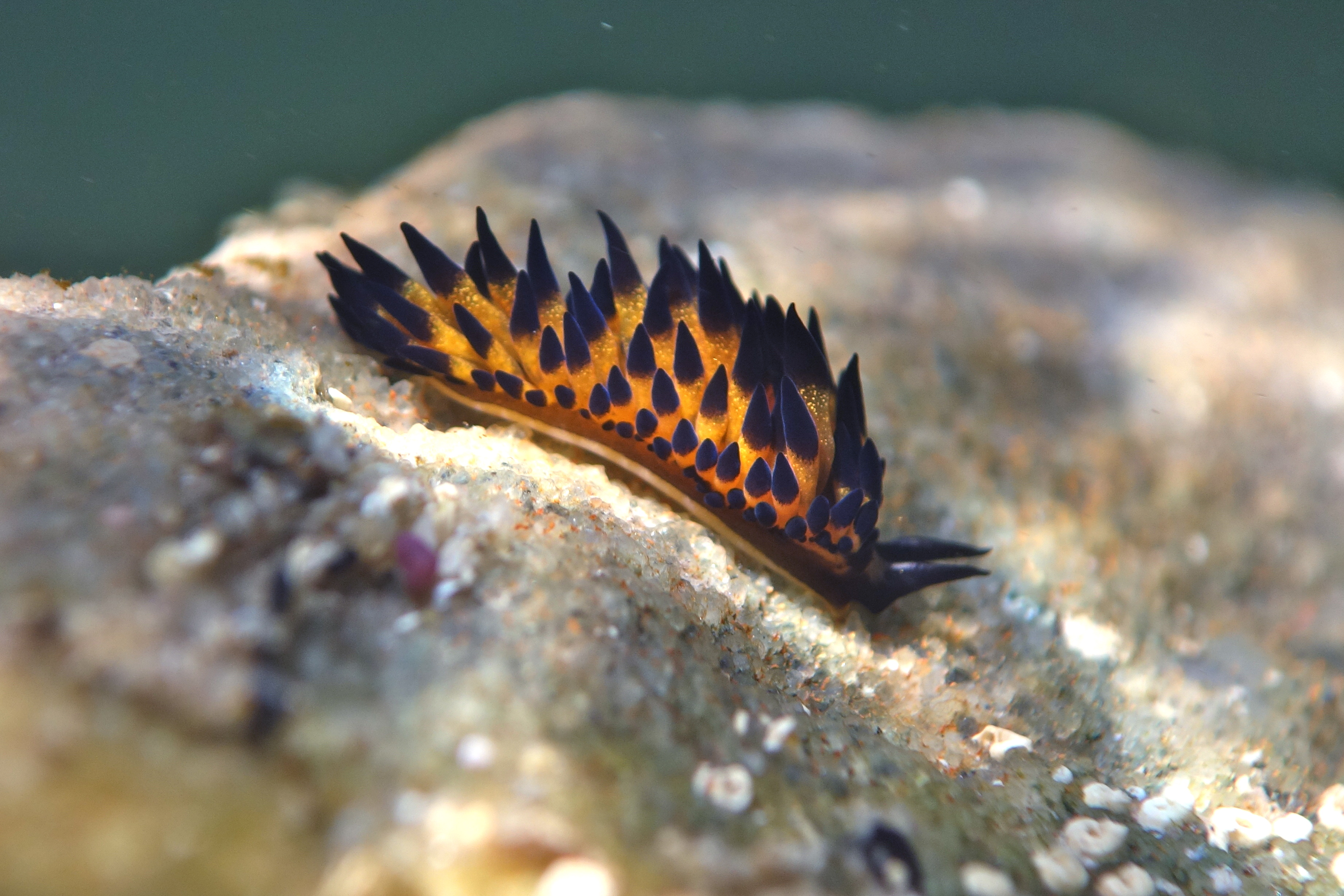
- Placida cremoniana

Scientific classification
- Kingdom: Animalia
- Phylum: Mollusca
- Class: Gastropoda
- Superorder: Sacoglossa
- Superfamily: Plakobranchoidea
- Family: Limapontiidae
- Genus: Placida; Trinchese, 1876

Synonyms
- Laura Trinchese, 1873 (Invalid: junior homonym of Laura Lacaze-Duthiers, 1873; Placida is a replacement name )

= Placida =

Genus of gastropods

Placida is a genus of very small or minute sea slugs, marine opisthobranch gastropod mollusks in the family Limapontiidae.

Although similar in appearance to nudibranchs, species in this genus are actually Sacoglossans.

== Species ==
Species within this genus include:

- Placida aoteana (Powell, 1937)
- Placida babai Ev. Marcus, 1982
- Placida barackobamai McCarthy, Krug & Valdés, 2017
- Placida brevirhina (Trinchese, 1874)
- Placida brookae McCarthy, Krug & Valdés, 2017
- Placida cremoniana (Trinchese, 1892)
- Placida dakariensis (Pruvot-Fol, 1953)
- Placida dendritica (Alder and Hancock, 1843)
- Placida fralila Burn, 1966
- Placida kevinleei McCarthy, Krug & Valdés, 2017
- Placida kingstoni T. E. Thompson, 1977
- Placida saronica (T.E. Thompson, 1988)
- Placida sudamericana Cetra, Gutiérrez Gregoric & Roche, 2021
- Placida tardyi (Trinchese, 1873)
- Placida verticillata Ortea, 1981
- Placida viridis (Trinchese, 1873)

Synonyms

- Placida brevicornis (A. Costa, 1867): synonym of Placida dendritica (Alder & Hancock, 1843)

Taxa inquirenda

- Placida capensis Macnae, 1954
- Placida daguilarensis Jensen, 1990 (taxon inquirendum)
