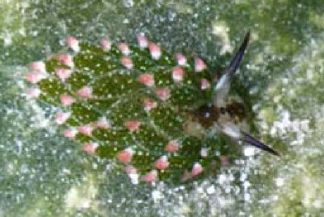
- Costasiella kuroshimae on Avrainvillea erecta. Locality: Lizard Island, Great Barrier Reef. The length of the slug is about 1 cm.

Scientific classification
- Kingdom: Animalia
- Phylum: Mollusca
- Class: Gastropoda
- Superorder: Sacoglossa
- Family: Costasiellidae
- Genus: Costasiella; Pruvot-Fol, 1951

Type species
- Costasiella virescens Pruvot-Fol, 1951

= Costasiella =

Genus of gastropods

Costasiella is a genus of sacoglossan sea slugs, a shell-less marine opisthobranchid gastropod mollusk in the family Costasiellidae. The Costasiella is defined by some specific characteristics such as smooth rhinophores which are usually simple with dull tips and flattened at their base. Other features include rounded, tentacular anterior foot corners that exhibit their spatulate shape to enhance mobility and blade-shaped radular teeth with substantially short bases. Most of the genus could be found within the tropical and subtropical regions of the Western Pacific oceans. Their preferred habitats include areas of soft, muddy sediments around intertidal zones. Their diets vary from species to species but generally consume various types of green algae, more commonly the Vaucheria and Avrainvillea.

The most recent diagnosis of the genus Costasiella is by the Dutch malacologist Cornelis Kees Swennen (2007).

== Species ==
There are 17 species in the genus Costasiella

- Costasiella arenaria K. R. Jensen, Krug, Dupont & Nishina, 2014
- Costasiella coronata Swennen, 2007
- Costasiella formicaria (Baba, 1959)
- Costasiella fridae Fernández-Simón & Moles, 2023
- Costasiella illa (Marcus, 1965)
- Costasiella iridophora Ichikawa, 1993
- Costasiella kuroshimae Ichikawa, 1993
- Costasiella mandorahae Jensen 1997
- Costasiella nonatoi Marcus & Marcus, 1960
- Costasiella ocellifera (Simroth, 1895)
- Costasiella pallida Jensen, 1985
- Costasiella patricki Espinoza, DuPont & Valdés, 2014
- Costasiella paweli Ichikawa, 1993
- Costasiella rubrolineata Ichikawa, 1993
- Costasiella usagi Ichikawa, 1993
- Costasiella vegae Ichikawa, 1993
- Costasiella virescens Pruvot-Fol, 1951

Species brought into synonymy

- Costasiella lilianae (Marcus & Marcus, 1969) - Clark (1984): synonym of Costasiella ocellifera (Simroth, 1895)
