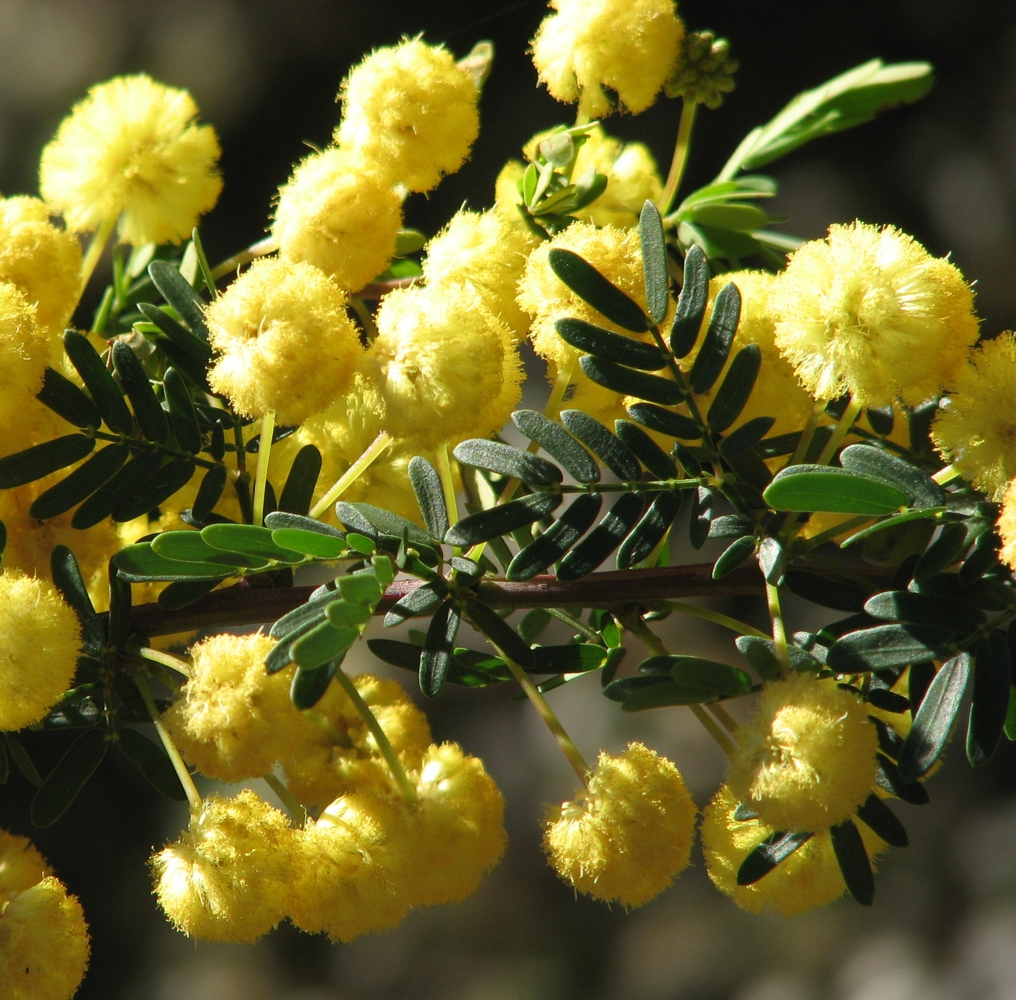

Scientific classification
- Kingdom: Plantae
- Clade: Tracheophytes
- Clade: Angiosperms
- Clade: Eudicots
- Clade: Rosids
- Order: Fabales
- Family: Fabaceae
- Subfamily: Caesalpinioideae
- Clade: Mimosoid clade
- Genus: Acacia
- Species: A. nigricans

Binomial name
- Acacia nigricans (Labill.) R.Br.
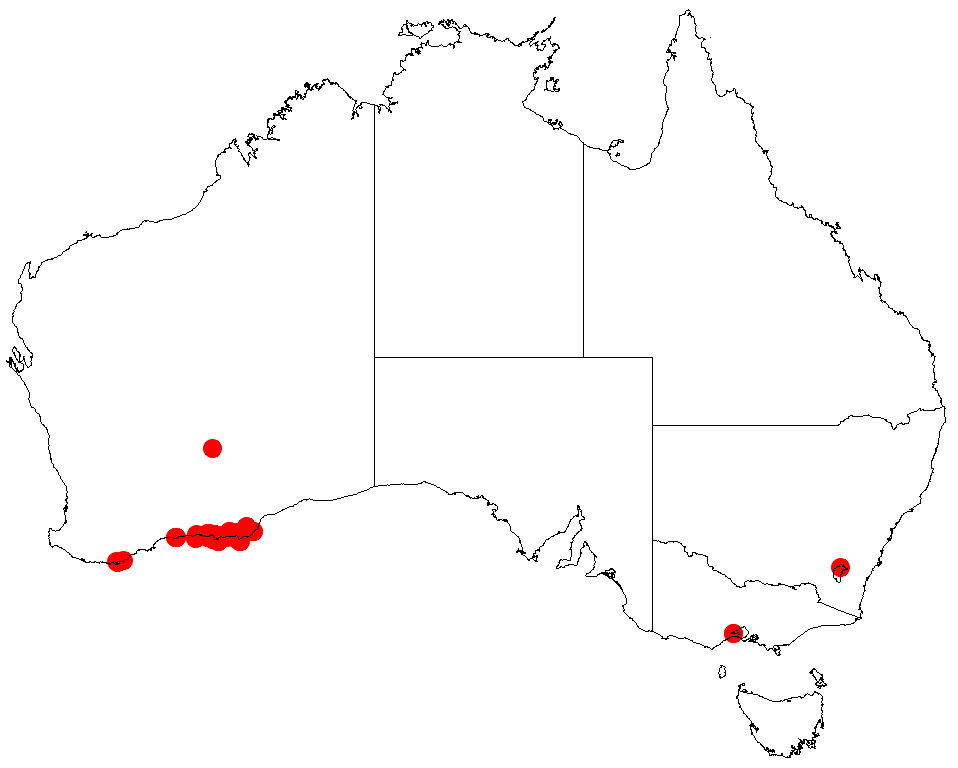
- Occurrence data from AVH

Synonyms
- Acacia ignorata K.Koch; Acacia nigricans (Labill.) R.Br. var. nigricans; Acacia rutaefolia Link nom. illeg.; Racosperma nigricans (Labill.) Pedley; Mimosa nigricans Labill.; Racosperma nigricans (Labill.) Pedley; Acacia obscura auct. non A.DC.: Bentham, G. (5 October 1864)

= Acacia nigricans =

Species of legume

Acacia nigricans is a species of flowering plant in the family Fabaceae, and is endemic to the south of Western Australia. It is a shrub with ribbed, usually hairy branchlets, bipinnate leaves, spherical heads of pale yellow flowers, and usually glabrous pods.

== Description ==
Acacia nigricans is a shrub that typically grows to a height of 0.5–1.5 m (1 ft 8 in – 4 ft 11 in) and has ribbed, usually hairy branchlets. The leaves are bipinnate with mostly two pairs of pinnae, the lower pinnae 2–4 mm (0.079–0.157 in) long, the outer pinnae 5–15 mm (0.20–0.59 in) long on a rachis 3–9 mm (0.12–0.35 in) long. The lower pinnae have 2 pinnules and the outer pinnae have 3 to 8 pinnules, and there is a sessile gland up to 2 mm (0.079 in) below the pinnae. The flowers are borne in spherical heads in up to three racemes 0.5–2 mm (0.020–0.079 in) long, each head on a peduncle 8–12 mm (0.31–0.47 in) long. The pods have 11 to 26 pale yellow flowers. Flowering occurs from July to November, and the pods are normally glabrous, 15–35 mm (0.59–1.38 in) long and 5–6 mm (0.20–0.24 in) wide. The seeds are oblong to elliptic, 2.5–3.0 mm (0.098–0.118 in) long.

== Taxonomy ==
In 1807, Jacques Labillardière described Mimosa nigricans in his Novae Hollandiae Plantarum Specimen. In 1813, Robert Brown transferred the species to Acacia as A. nigricans in Hortus Kewensis. The specific epithet (nigricans) means 'blackish', but the choice of the name was not explained by Labillardière.

== Distribution and habitat ==
This species of wattle grows on coastal sand dunes, granite hills and rocks growing in grey or white sand in heath and scrub in coastal areas from Barker Inlet to Israelite Bay, including the islands of the Recherche Archipelago, and inland to Howick Hill, in the Esperance Plains and Mallee bioregions of southern Western Australia.

== See also ==
- List of Acacia species
