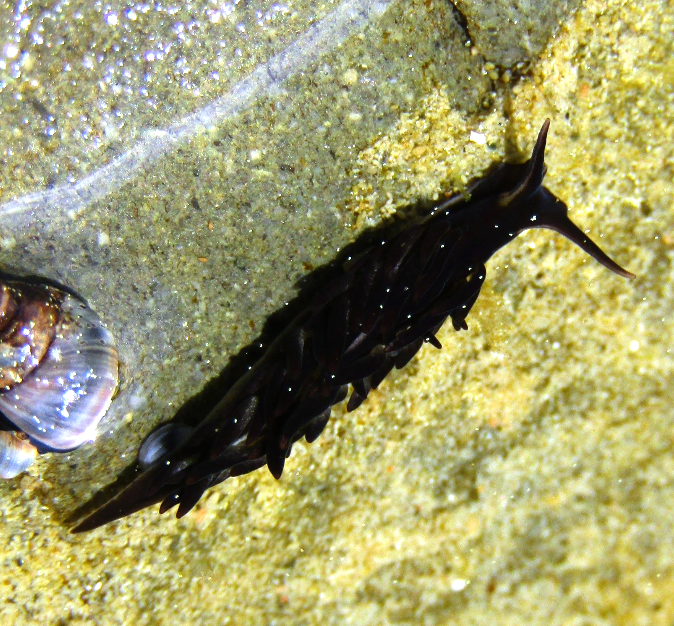
- Live specimen of Ercolania felina

Scientific classification
- Kingdom: Animalia
- Phylum: Mollusca
- Class: Gastropoda
- Superorder: Sacoglossa
- Family: Limapontiidae
- Genus: Ercolania
- Species: E. felina

Binomial name
- Ercolania felina (Hutton, 1882)

Synonyms
- Calliopaea felina Hutton, 1882; Stiliger felinus Hutton, 1882

= Ercolania felina =

Species of gastropod

Ercolania felina is a minute black species of sacoglossan or sap-sucking sea slug. It is a marine gastropod mollusk in the family Limapontiidae.

== Distribution ==
This marine species occurs off New Zealand.
