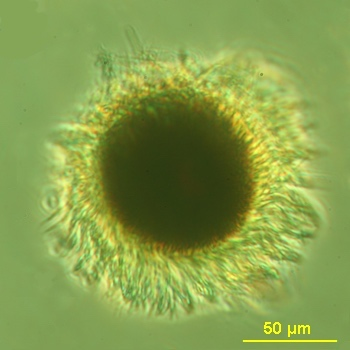

Scientific classification
- Domain: Eukaryota
- Clade: Sar
- Clade: Alveolata
- Phylum: Ciliophora
- Class: Litostomatea
- Order: Cyclotrichiida
- Family: Mesodiniidae
- Genus: Mesodinium
- Species: M. rubrum

Binomial name
- Mesodinium rubrum Hamburger and Buddenbrock, 1929

Synonyms
- Halteria rubra Lohmann, 1908; Myrionecta rubra Lohmann, 1908; Cyclotrichium meunieri Powers, 1932; Mesodinium pulex Bakker, 1966

= Mesodinium rubrum =

Species of single-celled organism

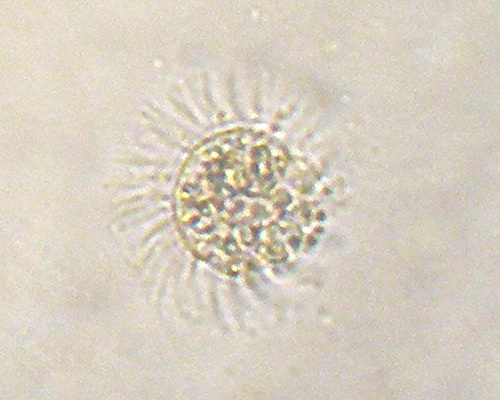
Mesodinium rubrum from north-west Black Sea

Mesodinium rubrum (or Myrionecta rubra) is a species of ciliates. It constitutes a plankton community and is found throughout the year, most abundantly in spring and fall, in coastal areas. Although discovered in 1908, its scientific importance came to light in the late 1960s when it attracted scientists by the recurrent red coloration it caused by forming massive blooms, that cause red tides in the oceans.

Unlike typical protozoans, M. rubrum can make its own nutrition by photosynthesis. The unusual autotrophic property was discovered in 2006 when genetic sequencing revealed that the photosynthesising organelles, plastids, were derived from the ciliate's principal food, the autotrophic algae called cryptomonads (or cryptophytes). Cryptomonads contain endosymbiont red algae whose internal chloroplasts indirectly enable M. rubrum to photosynthesize using sunlight. Interestingly, the red algae’s chloroplasts themselves evolved via another layer of endosymbiosis, with cyanobacteria. The ciliate is thus both autotrophic and heterotrophic at the same time. This also indicates that it is an example of multiple-stage endosymbiosis in the form of kleptoplasty. Moreover, these “stolen” plastids can be further transferred to additional hosts, as seen in the case of predation of M. rubrum by dinoflagellate planktons of the genus Dinophysis.

In 2009, a new species of Gram-negative bacteria called Maritalea myrionectae was discovered from a cell culture of M. rubrum.

== Description ==
M. rubrum is a free-living marine ciliate. It is reddish in colour and forms dark-red mass during blooming. Its body is almost spherical, looking like a miniature sunflower with its radiating hair-like cilia on its body surface. It measures up to 100 μm in length and 75 μm in width. The body is superficially divided into two lobes due to formation of a constriction at the centre. The constriction gives rise to a larger anterior lobe and a smaller posterior lobe. The cilia arise from the constriction. Using the cilia it can jump about 10-20 times its body length in one movement. Its nucleus is prominently situated at the centre, and is surrounded by organelles mostly derived from algae. For example, its cytoplasm contains numerous plastids, mitochondria and other nuclei. These organelles are properly separated such that the mitochondria are fully enclosed in a vacuole membrane and two endoplasmic reticulum membranes of the ciliate. This indicates that the ciliate is primarily a heterotroph, but after acquiring algal plastid, it transforms into an autotroph.

=== The endosymbiont ===
Genetic analysis showed that in the American coastal areas, the primary food of M. rubrum is the algae most closely related to the free-living Geminigera cryophila. But in Japanese coasts, the major algal species is Teleaulax amphioxeia. When these plastid-containing algae are ingested by the ciliate, they are not digested. The plastids remain functional and provide nutrition to the ciliate by photosynthesis. In order for the plastids to be normally active, they still require enzymes, which are synthesised by the sequestered algal nuclei. The single nucleus can survive and remain genetically active up to 30 days in the cytoplasm of the ciliate. As the retention time of the prey nuclei is short, an average M. rubrum cell may contain eight algal plastids per single prey nucleus and the nuclei need to be replaced by continuous feeding on fresh algae. Thus, the algal organelles are not permanently integrated.
