= Kleptoplasty =

Form of algae symbiosis

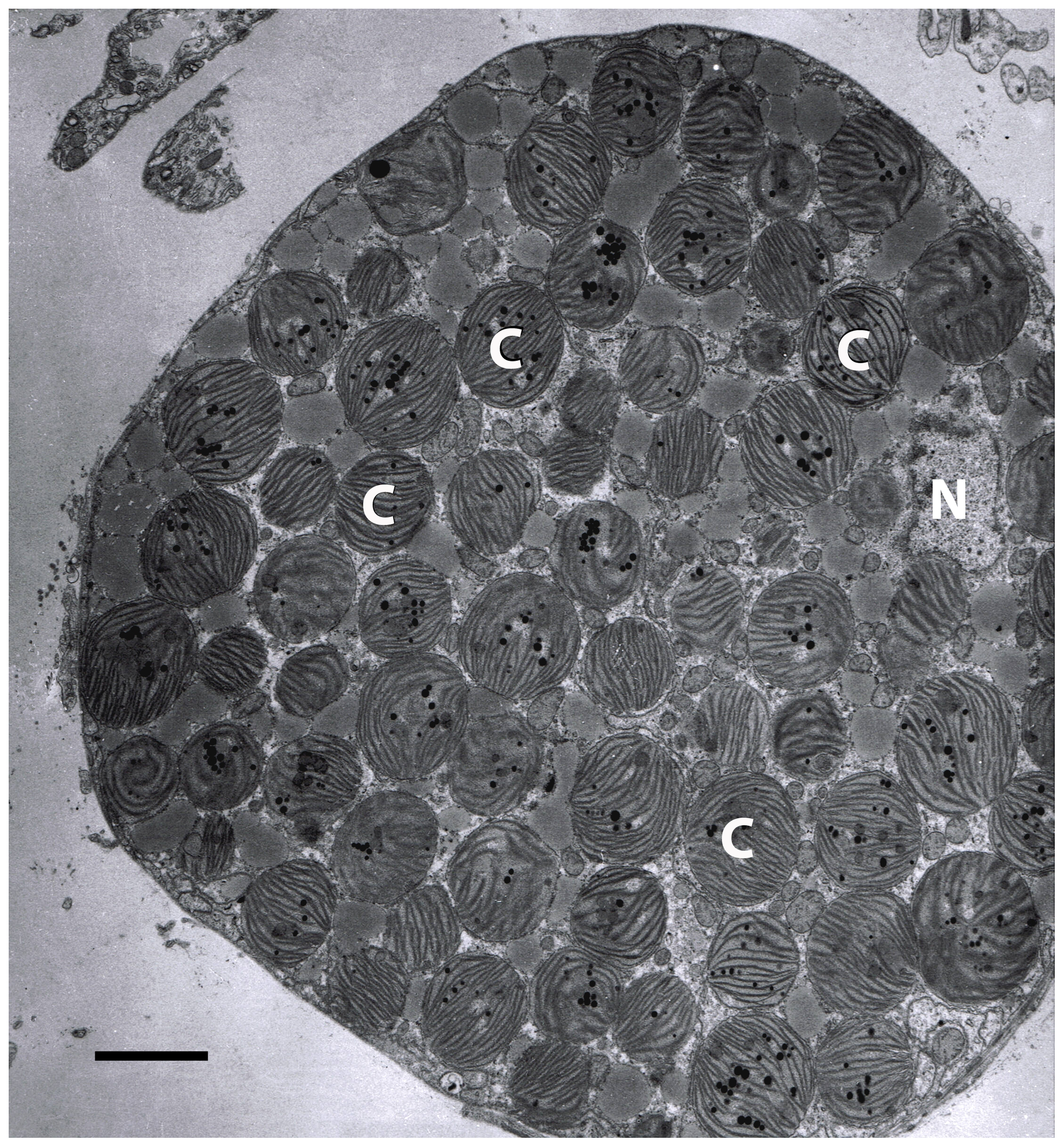
A digestive tubule cell of the sea slug Elysia clarki, packed with chloroplasts taken from green algae. C = chloroplast, N = cell nucleus. Electron micrograph: scale bar is 3 μm.

Kleptoplasty or kleptoplastidy is a process in symbiotic relationships whereby plastids, notably chloroplasts from algae, are sequestered by the host. The algae is eaten normally and partially digested, leaving the plastid intact. The plastids are maintained within the host, temporarily continuing photosynthesis and benefiting the host.

== Etymology ==
The word kleptoplasty is derived from Ancient Greek κλέπτης (kléptēs), meaning 'thief', and πλαστός (plastós), originally meaning formed or moulded, and used in biology to mean a plastid.

== Process ==
Kleptoplasty is a process in symbiotic relationships whereby plastids, notably chloroplasts from algae, are sequestered by the host. The alga is eaten normally and partially digested, leaving the plastid intact. The plastids are maintained within the host, temporarily continuing photosynthesis and benefiting the host. The term was coined in 1990 to describe chloroplast symbiosis.

== Occurrence ==
Kleptoplasty has been acquired in various independent clades of eukaryotes, namely single-celled protists of the SAR supergroup and the Euglenozoa phylum, and some marine invertebrate animals.

- Eukaryota
  - SAR supergroup
    - Rhizaria
      Foraminifera
    - Alveolata
      - Dinoflagellata
      - Ciliata
  - Discoba
    - Euglenozoa
      Rapazida
  - Animalia
    - - Spiralia
        - Platyhelminthes
          Rhabdocoela
        - Gastropoda
          - Sacoglossa
          - Nudibranchia

=== In protists ===
==== Foraminifera ====
Some species of the foraminiferan genera Bulimina, Elphidium, Haynesina, Nonion, Nonionella, Nonionellina, Reophax, and Stainforthia sequester diatom chloroplasts.

==== Dinoflagellates ====
The stability of transient plastids varies considerably across plastid-retaining species. In the dinoflagellates Gymnodinium spp. and Pfiesteria piscicida, kleptoplastids are photosynthetically active for only a few days, while kleptoplastids in Dinophysis spp., taken from cryptophytes, can be stable for 2 months. In other dinoflagellates, kleptoplasty has been hypothesized to represent either a mechanism permitting functional flexibility, or perhaps an early evolutionary stage in the permanent acquisition of chloroplasts.

==== Ciliates ====
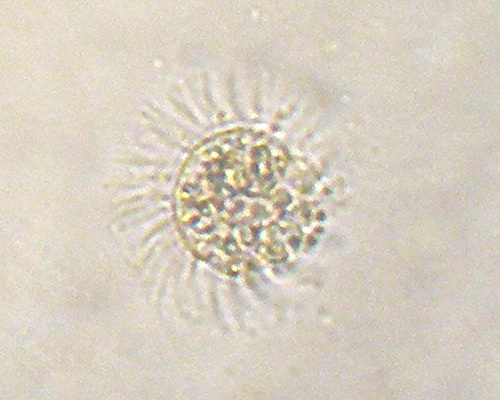
Mesodinium rubrum

Mesodinium rubrum is a ciliate that steals chloroplasts from the cryptomonad Geminigera cryophila. M. rubrum participates in additional endosymbiosis by transferring its plastids to its predators, the dinoflagellate planktons belonging to the genus Dinophysis.

Karyoklepty is a related process in which the nucleus of the prey cell is kept by the host as well. This was first described in 2007 in M. rubrum.

==== Euglenozoa ====
The first and only case of kleptoplasty within Euglenozoa belongs to the species Rapaza viridis, the earliest diverging lineage of Euglenophyceae. This microorganism requires a constant supply of a strain of Tetraselmis microalgae, which it ingests to extract chloroplasts. The kleptoplasts are then progressively transformed into ones that resemble the permanent chloroplasts of the remaining Euglenophyceae. Cells of Rapaza viridis can survive for up to 35 days with these kleptoplasts.

Kleptoplasty is considered the mode of nutrition of the euglenophycean common ancestor. It is hypothesized that kleptoplasty allowed for various events of horizontal gene transfer that eventually allowed the establishment of permanent chloroplasts in the remaining Euglenophyceae.

=== Animals ===
==== Rhabdocoel flatworms ====
Two species of rhabdocoel marine flatworms, Baicalellia solaris and Pogaina paranygulgus, make use of kleptoplasty. The group was previously classified as having algal endosymbionts, though it was already discovered that the endosymbionts did not contain nuclei.

While consuming diatoms, B. solaris and P. paranygulus, in a process not yet discovered, extract plastids from their prey, incorporating them subepidermally, while separating and digesting the frustule and remainder of the diatom. In B. solaris the extracted plastids, or kleptoplasts, continue to exhibit functional photosynthesis for a short period of roughly 7 days. As the two groups are not sister taxa, and the trait is not shared among groups more closely related, there is evidence that kleptoplasty evolved independently within the two taxa.

==== Sea slugs (gastropods) ====
===== Sacoglossa =====
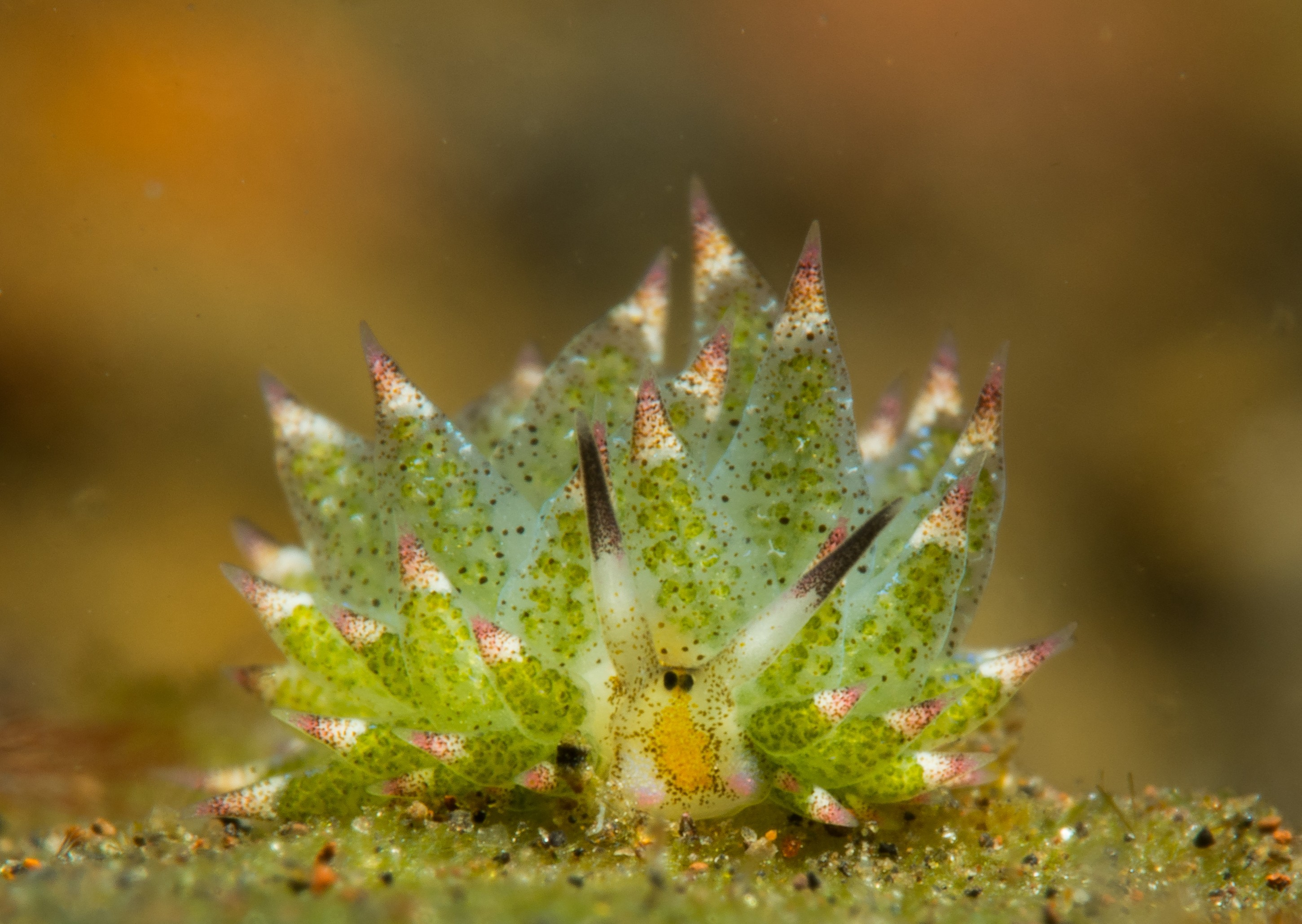
Costasiella kuroshimae, a Sacoglossan sea slug which uses kleptoplasty to create complex patterns on its body

Sea slugs in the clade Sacoglossa practise kleptoplasty. Several species of Sacoglossan sea slugs capture intact, functional chloroplasts from algal food sources, retaining them within specialized cells lining the mollusc's digestive diverticula. The longest known kleptoplastic association, which can last up to ten months, is found in Elysia chlorotica, which acquires chloroplasts by eating the alga Vaucheria litorea, storing the chloroplasts in the cells that line its gut. Juvenile sea slugs establish the kleptoplastic endosymbiosis when feeding on algal cells, sucking out the cell contents, and discarding everything except the chloroplasts. The chloroplasts are phagocytosed by digestive cells, filling extensively branched digestive tubules, providing their host with the products of photosynthesis. It is not resolved, however, whether the stolen plastids actively secrete photosynthate or whether the slugs profit indirectly from slowly degrading kleptoplasts.

Due to this unusual ability, the sacoglossans are sometimes referred to as "solar-powered sea slugs", though the actual benefit from photosynthesis on the survival of some of the species that have been analyzed seems to be marginal at best. Studies have found that photosynthates from captured chloroplasts are able to influence growth in Elysia viridis. How long a sacoglossan can live without food seems not to depend on the photosynthetic activity of its kleptoplasts, but rather on the ability of that sacoglossan species to manage starvation.

Changes in temperature have been shown to negatively affect kleptoplastic abilities in sacoglossans. Rates of photosynthetic efficiency as well as kleptoplast abundance have been shown to decrease in correlation to a decrease in temperature. The patterns and rate of these changes, however, varies between different species of sea slug.

===== Nudibranchia =====
Some species of another group of sea slugs, nudibranchs such as Pteraeolidia ianthina, sequester whole living symbiotic zooxanthellae within their digestive diverticula, and thus are similarly "solar-powered".

== See also ==
- Horizontal gene transfer
- Kleptoprotein
- Kleptocnidy
- Photosymbiosis
