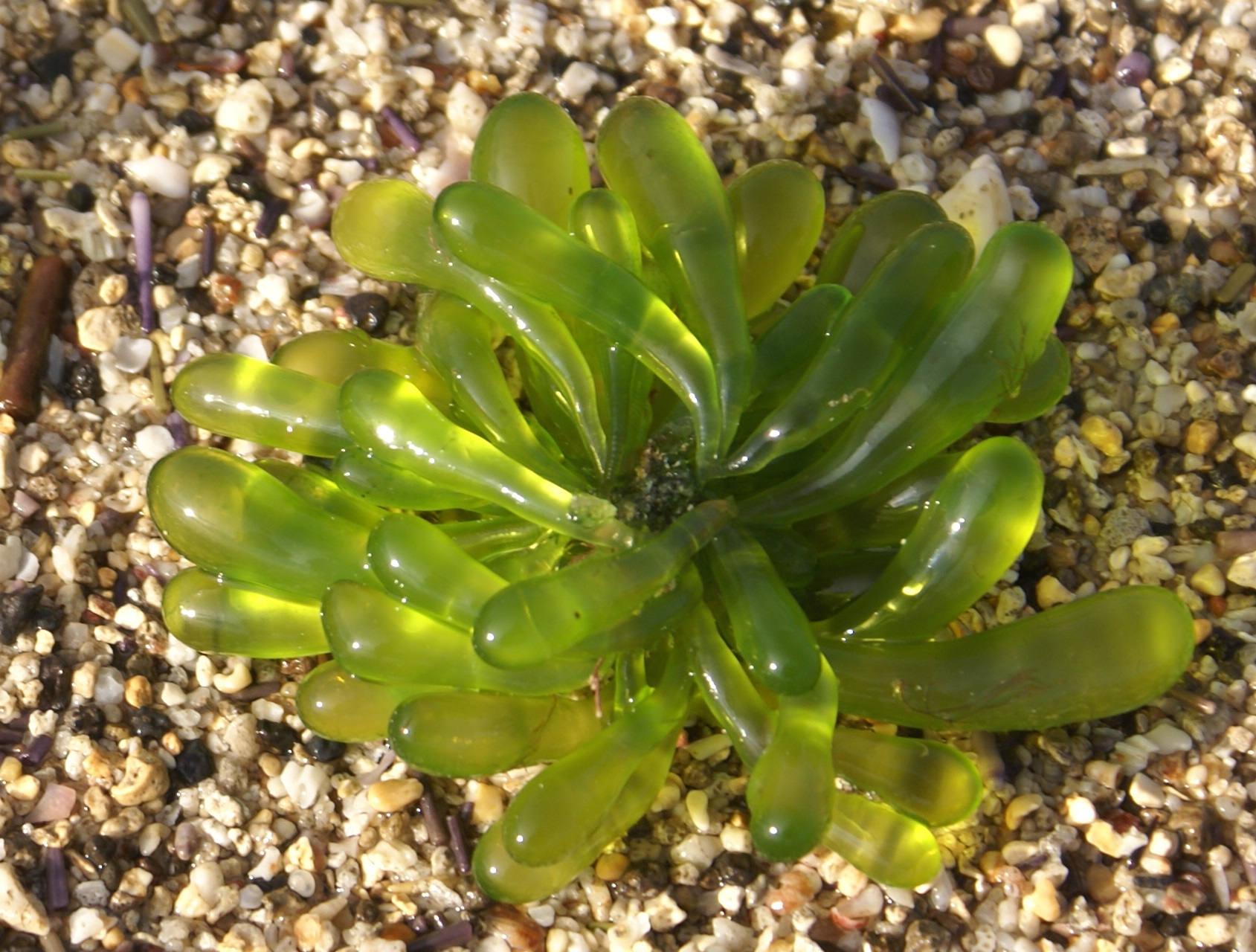
- Boergesenia forbesii

Scientific classification
- Kingdom: Plantae
- Division: Chlorophyta
- Class: Ulvophyceae
- Order: Cladophorales
- Family: Siphonocladaceae
- Genus: Boergesenia; J.Feldmann

Species
- Boergesenia forbesii

= Boergesenia =

Genus of algae

Boergesenia is a genus of green algae in the family Siphonocladaceae.
