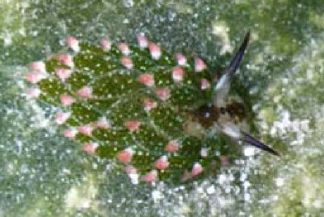
- Costasiella cf. kuroshimae on Avrainvillea erecta. Locality: Lizard Island, Great Barrier Reef. The length of the slug is about 1 cm.

Scientific classification
- Kingdom: Animalia
- Phylum: Mollusca
- Class: Gastropoda
- Subterclass: Tectipleura
- Superorder: Sacoglossa
- Superfamily: Plakobranchoidea
- Family: Costasiellidae; K. B. Clark, 1984

Species
- See text

= Costasiellidae =

Family of gastropods

Costasiellidae is a taxonomic family of small to minute sacoglossan sea slugs. These are marine opisthobranch gastropod mollusks belonging to the superfamily Plakobranchoidea.

These sea slugs resembling nudibranchs, but are not closely related to them.

This family has no subfamilies.

== Genera ==
The following genera belong to the family Costasiellidae:

- Costasiella Pruvot-Fol, 1951
- Panderevela Moro & Ortea, 2015
