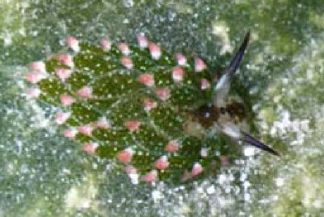
- Costasiella cf. kuroshimae on Avrainvillea erecta. Locality: Lizard Island, Great Barrier Reef. The length of the slug is about 1 cm.

Scientific classification
- Domain: Eukaryota
- Clade: Archaeplastida
- Clade: Viridiplantae
- Division: Chlorophyta
- Class: Ulvophyceae
- Order: Bryopsidales
- Family: Dichotomosiphonaceae
- Genus: Avrainvillea; Decaisne, 1842

Type species
- Avrainvillea nigricans Decaisne, 1842

Species
- A. amadelpha; A. asarifolia; A. calathina; A. canariensis; A. clavatiramea; A. digitata; A. elliottii; A. erecta; A. fenicalii; A. fulva; A. gardineri; A. geppiorum; A. hayi; A. hollenbergii; A. lacerata; A. levis; A. longicaulis; A. mazei; A. nigricans; A. obscura; A. pacifica; A. rawsonii; A. ridleyi; A. riukiuensis; A. rotumensis; A. silvana; A. sylvearleae

= Avrainvillea =

Genus of algae

Avrainvillea is a genus of green algae in the family Dichotomosiphonaceae.

== Description ==
Avrainvillea is a green siphonous marine macroalgal species. In the tropical species the dichotomously and branched filaments are generally united.

== Distribution ==
The genus has a worldwide tropical distribution.

== Ecology ==
The species occur from the intertidal to 60m.

== As sources of bioactive natural products ==
Avrainvillea erecta was reported to have strong hemagglutination activity. In addition, the chloroform fraction of a methanol extract of Avrainvillea erecta exhibited hydrogen peroxide scavenging activity as strong as that shown by gallic acid.

Eight new species are listed and described.
