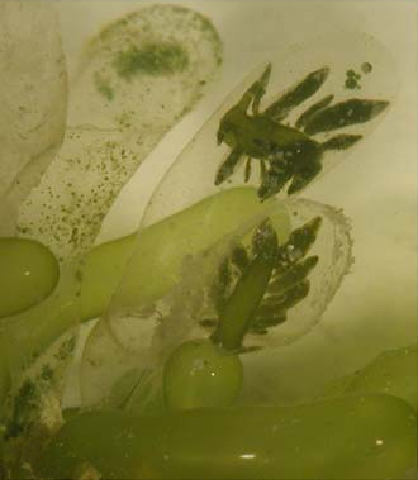
- Ercolania kencolesi inside of Boergesenia cf. forbesii. Locality: Lizard Island, Great Barrier Reef. The length of the slug is about 0.5 cm

Scientific classification
- Kingdom: Animalia
- Phylum: Mollusca
- Class: Gastropoda
- Superorder: Sacoglossa
- Superfamily: Plakobranchoidea
- Family: Limapontiidae; Gray, 1847

Genera
- See text.

Synonyms
- Pontolimacidae Keferstein, 1863; Stiligeridae Iredale & O'Donoghue, 1923; Oleidae O'Donoghue, 1926; Alderiidae Pruvot-Fol, 1954; Ercolaniinae Schmekel & Portmann, 1982; Costasiellidae K. B. Clark, 1984

= Limapontiidae =

Family of gastropods

Limapontiidae is a taxonomic family of small to minute sacoglossan sea slugs. These are marine opisthobranch gastropod mollusks.

These sea slugs resemble nudibranchs, but are not closely related to them. Most of the species are green because of the green algae they eat and live on.

In the taxonomy of Bouchet & Rocroi (2005), the former family Stiligeridae is described as a synonym of the family Limapontiidae Gray, 1847, belonging to the superfamily Limapontioidea Jensen, 1996.

This family has no subfamilies.

== Genera ==
The following genera belong to the family Limapontiidae:

- Alderella Odhner in Franc, 1968
- Alderia Allman, 1846
- Alderiopsis Baba, 1968
- Calliopaea d'Orbigny, 1837
- Costasiella Pruvot-Fol, 1951 - 15 species
- Ercolania Trinchese, 1872
- Limapontia Johnston, 1836 - type genus
- Olea Agersborg, 1923
- Placida Trinchese, 1876
- Sacoproteus Krug et al. 2018
- Stiliger Ehrenberg, 1831

Genera brought into synonymy

- Alderina Pruvot-Fol, 1954 : synonym of Alderella Odhner in Franc, 1968
- Chalidis Quatrefages, 1844 : synonym of Limapontia Johnston, 1836
- Custiphorus Deshayes, 1853 : synonym of Calliopaea d'Orbigny, 1837
- Laura Trinchese, 1873 : synonym of Placida Trinchese, 1876
