= P. orientalis =

P. orientalis may refer to:

- Paradelma orientalis, the Brigalow scaly-foot or Queensland snake-lizard, a lizard species endemic to Australia
- Peripatopsis orientalis, the velvet worm species found in South Africa
- Phalanger orientalis, the northern common cuscus, a marsupial species native to northern New Guinea
- Phylloscopus orientalis, the Eastern Bonelli's warbler, a bird species
- Picea orientalis, the Caucasian spruce or Oriental spruce, a tree species native to the Caucasus and adjacent northeast Turkey
- Platanus orientalis, the Oriental plane, a large deciduous tree species native from the Balkans to as far east as at least Iran
- Platycladus orientalis, an evergreen coniferous tree species native to northwestern China
- Platysaurus orientalis, the Sekukhune flat lizard, a reptile species found in Africa
- Plectorhinchus orientalis, a grunt species from the Indo-Pacific
- Poecilmitis orientalis, a butterfly species endemic to South Africa
- Polybranchia orientalis, a sea slug species found in the Indian and Pacific Oceans
- Pseudanthus orientalis, a plant species in the genus Pseudanthus endemic to Australia
- Pseudomonas orientalis, a Gram-negative rod-shaped bacterium isolated from spring waters in Lebanon
- Pterocles orientalis, the black-bellied sandgrouse, a medium large bird species found in Iberia, northwest Africa, the Canary Islands, Turkey, Iran, Cyprus and Israel

== Synonyms ==
- Psalidoprocne orientalis, a synonym for Psalidoprocne pristoptera, the black saw-wing or black rough-winged swallow, a small passerine bird species
- Pyralis orientalis, a synonym for Pyralis farinalis, the meal moth, a cosmopolitan moth species

== See also ==
- Orientalis (disambiguation)
