= Noto (disambiguation) =

Noto is a town in Sicily, Italy, and may refer to:

- Noto Radio Observatory in Sicily
- Roman Catholic Diocese of Noto, Sicily
- Noto Cathedral, Sicily

Noto may also refer to:

== Places ==
Finland

- Nötö, a small island in the Archipelago Sea

Japan

- Noto Peninsula, a peninsula in Japan
- Noto Province, an old province of Japan
- Noto Airport, an airport in Japan
- Noto, Ishikawa (Fugeshi) (能都町), a former town which merged with neighboring towns on the peninsula in 2005 to become:
- Noto, Ishikawa (能登町)

Russia

- Nötö, the Swedish name for Orexovyj óstrov in Russia

== People ==
- Alva Noto, also Noto, the pseudonym of the German artist Carsten Nicolai (born 1965)
- Anthony Noto (born 1968), American businessman
- Arisa Noto (born 1988), Japanese singer
- Kimie Noto (born 1952), Japanese track athlete
- Lore Noto (1923–2002), producer of The Fantasticks
- Mamiko Noto (born 1970), Japanese voice actress
- Masahito Noto (born 1990), Japanese footballer
- Phil Noto, American artist
- Sam Noto (1930–2026), American jazz trumpeter
- Silvio Noto (1926–2000), Italian radio and television personality
- Tokushige Noto (1902–1991), Japanese sprinter
- Vito Noto (born 1955), Italian industrial designer

== Other ==
- Noto fonts, a font family designed to cover all the scripts encoded in the Unicode standard
- Noto (train), a train service operating in Japan
- Noto Railway on the Noto Peninsula of Japan
- Notochord, a cartilaginous rod in some animals
- Notochord homeobox (NOTO) gene, a transcription factor encoded by the notochord homeobox gene on chromosome 2
- Hermaea noto, a species of sea slug
