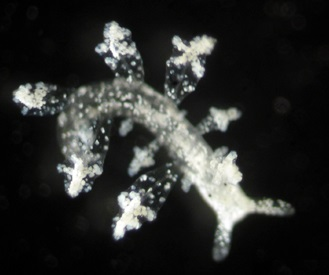

Scientific classification
- Kingdom: Animalia
- Phylum: Mollusca
- Class: Gastropoda
- Superorder: Sacoglossa
- Family: Hermaeidae
- Genus: Hermaea
- Species: H. cruciata

Binomial name
- Hermaea cruciata (Gould, 1870)

= Hermaea cruciata =

Species of gastropod

Hermaea cruciata is a species of sacoglossan sea slug, a shell-less marine opisthobranch gastropod mollusk in the family Hermaeidae.
