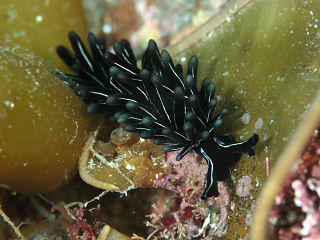

Scientific classification
- Kingdom: Animalia
- Phylum: Mollusca
- Class: Gastropoda
- Family: Hermaeidae
- Genus: Aplysiopsis
- Species: A. nigra

Binomial name
- Aplysiopsis nigra (Baba, 1949)

= Aplysiopsis nigra =

Species of gastropod

Aplysiopsis nigra is a species of sacoglossan sea slug, a shell-less marine opisthobranch gastropod mollusc in the family Hermaeidae.
