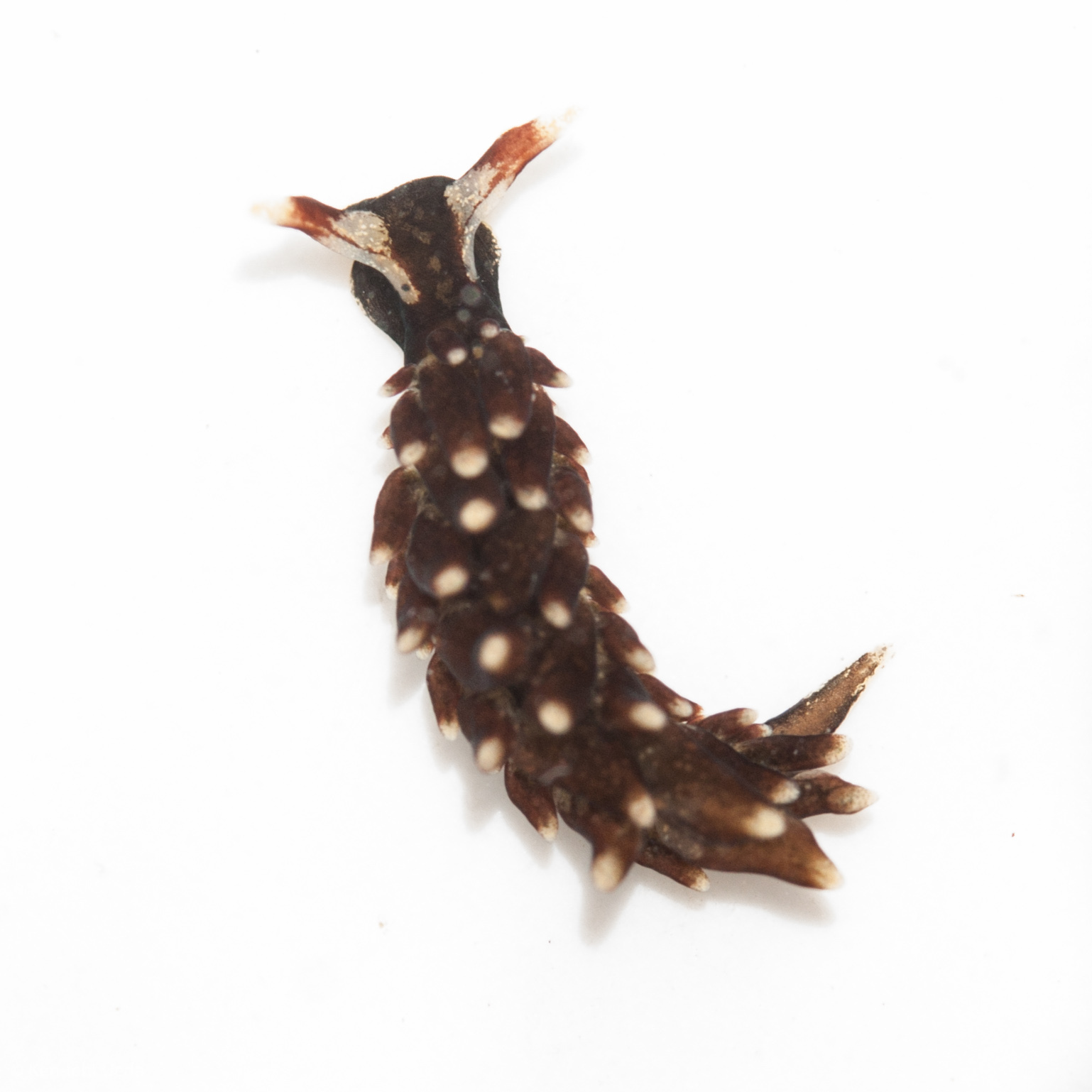

Scientific classification
- Kingdom: Animalia
- Phylum: Mollusca
- Class: Gastropoda
- Superorder: Sacoglossa
- Family: Hermaeidae
- Genus: Aplysiopsis
- Species: A. enteromorphae

Binomial name
- Aplysiopsis enteromorphae (Cockerell & Eliot, 1905)

= Aplysiopsis enteromorphae =

Species of gastropod

Aplysiopsis enteromorphae is a species of sacoglossan sea slug, a shell-less marine opisthobranch gastropod mollusk in the family Hermaeidae.

== Distribution ==
This species is known to be present along the western coast of North America from Alaska to Mexico.
