= Hermaea wrangeliae =

Scientific classification
- Domain: Eukaryota
- Kingdom: Animalia
- Phylum: Mollusca
- Class: Gastropoda
- Family: Hermaeidae
- Genus: Hermaea
- Species: H. wrangeliae

Binomial name
- Hermaea wrangeliae (Ichikawa, 1993)

Species of gastropod

Hermaea wrangeliae is a species of sacoglossan sea slug, a shell-less marine opisthobranch gastropod mollusk in the family Hermaeidae.
