= Cyerce kikutarobabai =

Scientific classification
- Kingdom: Animalia
- Phylum: Mollusca
- Class: Gastropoda
- Superorder: Sacoglossa
- Family: Hermaeidae
- Genus: Cyerce
- Species: C. kikutarobabai

Binomial name
- Cyerce kikutarobabai Hamatani, 1976

Species of gastropod

Cyerce kikutarobabai is a species of sacoglossan sea slug, a shell-less marine opisthobranch gastropod mollusk in the family Caliphyllidae.

The specific name kikutarobabai is in honor of the Japanese malacologist Kikutaro Baba.

== Distribution ==
This species occurs in the Pacific Ocean.
