= Hermaea hillae =

Scientific classification
- Kingdom: Animalia
- Phylum: Mollusca
- Class: Gastropoda
- Superorder: Sacoglossa
- Family: Hermaeidae
- Genus: Hermaea
- Species: H. hillae

Binomial name
- Hermaea hillae (Er. Marcus & Ev. Marcus, 1967)

Species of gastropod

Hermaea hillae is a species of sacoglossan sea slug, a shell-less marine opisthobranch gastropod mollusk in the family Hermaeidae.
