= Aplysiopsis orientalis =

Scientific classification
- Kingdom: Animalia
- Phylum: Mollusca
- Class: Gastropoda
- Family: Hermaeidae
- Genus: Aplysiopsis
- Species: A. orientalis

Binomial name
- Aplysiopsis orientalis (Baba, 1949)

Species of gastropod

Aplysiopsis orientalis is a species of sacoglossan sea slug, a shell-less marine opisthobranch gastropod mollusk in the family Hermaeidae.

== Distribution ==
This species is known to occur in the northwestern Pacific Ocean.
