= Aplysiopsis formosa =

Scientific classification
- Domain: Eukaryota
- Kingdom: Animalia
- Phylum: Mollusca
- Class: Gastropoda
- Family: Hermaeidae
- Genus: Aplysiopsis
- Species: A. formosa

Binomial name
- Aplysiopsis formosa (Pruvot-Fol, 1953)

Species of gastropod

Aplysiopsis formosa is a species of sacoglossan sea slug, a shell-less marine opisthobranch gastropod mollusc in the family Hermaeidae.
