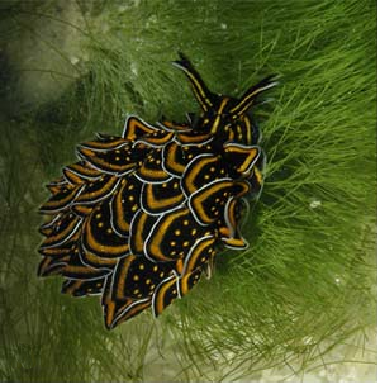
- Cyerce nigricans on Chlorodesmis fastigiata. Locality: Lizard Island, Great Barrier Reef. The length of the slug is about 4 cm.

Scientific classification
- Kingdom: Animalia
- Phylum: Mollusca
- Class: Gastropoda
- Family: Hermaeidae
- Genus: Cyerce
- Species: C. nigricans

Binomial name
- Cyerce nigricans (Pease, 1866)

= Cyerce nigricans =

Species of gastropod

Cyerce nigricans, is a species of sacoglossan sea slug, a shell-less marine opisthobranch gastropod mollusk in the family Caliphyllidae. Akin to other species of sea slugs, they dwell in reef flats and similar areas. In contrast to the rest of the genus Cyerce, Cyerce nigricans are not cryptically colored. They are often used as the staple animal of the Great Barrier Reef because of their outlandish coloration, often appearing in blacks, yellows, reds, and oranges. The cerata of Cyerce nigricans are occasionally compared to the wings of a butterfly, based on their shape and color. This sea slug has developed autotomy, or the ability to drop parts of its cerata when threatened.

== Distribution ==
This species has been observed in the western and central Pacific Ocean and the Indian Ocean. The last known sighting of the Black-and-gold Sapsucking Slug was in the Pemba North Region on January 4, 2026.

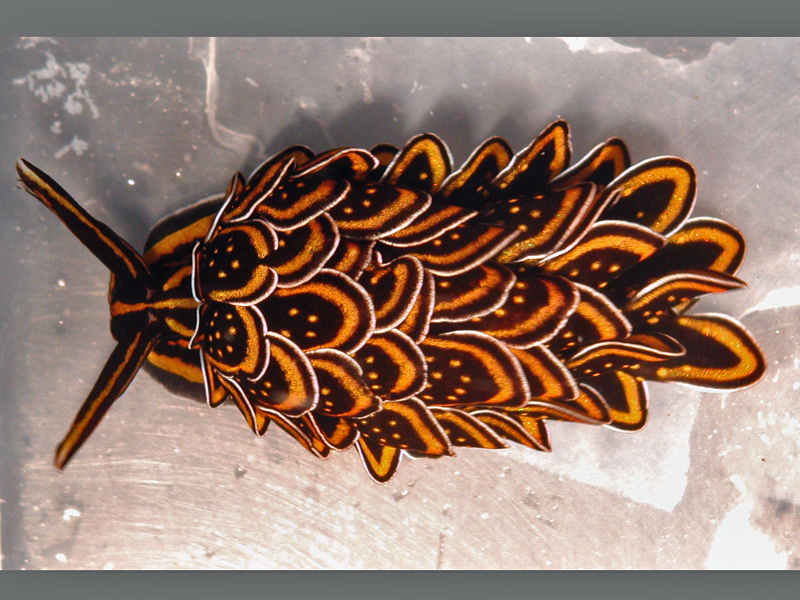
Dorsal view of Cyerce nigricans.
