= Hermaea boucheti =

Scientific classification
- Kingdom: Animalia
- Phylum: Mollusca
- Class: Gastropoda
- Superorder: Sacoglossa
- Family: Hermaeidae
- Genus: Hermaea
- Species: H. boucheti

Binomial name
- Hermaea boucheti Cervera, Garcia-Gomez & Ortea, 1991

Species of gastropod

Hermaea boucheti is a species of sacoglossan sea slug in the family Hermaeidae. Hermaea boucheti exhibits predominantly yellowish to yellowish-green translucent body colorations and has an opaque white pericardial zone.

== Distribution ==
This species is found in the North Atlantic Ocean off the Spanish coast, including Strait of Gibraltar.
