= Hermaea evelinemarcusae =

Scientific classification
- Kingdom: Animalia
- Phylum: Mollusca
- Class: Gastropoda
- Superorder: Sacoglossa
- Family: Hermaeidae
- Genus: Hermaea
- Species: H. evelinemarcusae

Binomial name
- Hermaea evelinemarcusae (Jensen, 1993)

Species of gastropod

Hermaea evelinemarcusae is a species of sacoglossan sea slug, a shell-less marine opisthobranch gastropod mollusk in the family Hermaeidae.
