= Hermaea paucicirra =

Scientific classification
- Kingdom: Animalia
- Phylum: Mollusca
- Class: Gastropoda
- Superorder: Sacoglossa
- Family: Hermaeidae
- Genus: Hermaea
- Species: H. paucicirra

Binomial name
- Hermaea paucicirra (Pruvot-Fol, 1953)

Species of gastropod

Hermaea paucicirra is a species of sacoglossan sea slug, a shell-less marine opisthobranch gastropod mollusk in the family Hermaeidae.

== Distribution ==
This species is known to occur in West Africa, Spain, and the western Mediterranean.
