= Hermaea vancouverensis =

Scientific classification
- Kingdom: Animalia
- Phylum: Mollusca
- Class: Gastropoda
- Superorder: Sacoglossa
- Family: Hermaeidae
- Genus: Hermaea
- Species: H. vancouverensis

Binomial name
- Hermaea vancouverensis (O'Donoghue, 1924)

Species of gastropod

Hermaea vancouverensis is a species of sacoglossan sea slug, a shell-less marine opisthobranch gastropod mollusk in the family Hermaeidae.

== Distribution ==
This species is known to occur in the northeast Pacific in Alaska to California and South Kuril Islands, Russia.
