= Aplysiopsis sinusmensalis =

Scientific classification
- Domain: Eukaryota
- Kingdom: Animalia
- Phylum: Mollusca
- Class: Gastropoda
- Family: Hermaeidae
- Genus: Aplysiopsis
- Species: A. sinusmensalis

Binomial name
- Aplysiopsis sinusmensalis (Macnae, 1954)

Species of sea slug

Aplysiopsis sinusmensalis, the Table Bay nudibranch, is a species of sacoglossan sea slug, a shell-less marine opisthobranch gastropod mollusk in the family Hermaeidae.

== Distribution ==
This species is only known to occur in South Africa. It has been found off Blouberg, Milnerton, Oudekraal and Llandudno on the Atlantic coast of the Cape Peninsula and at Buffels Bay in False Bay. It appears to be endemic to this area.

== Description ==
The Table Bay nudibranch is small, growing up to 20mm in total length. Its body is elongated and brown to olive green. It has a lighter brown white-margined band extending down the back of the head. Its cerata and rhinophores are broad and somewhat flattened.

== Ecology ==
The Table Bay nudibranch has been found in shallow water, mainly estuaries and tidal pools, on the green algae Ulva sp.
