= Cyerce elegans =

Scientific classification
- Kingdom: Animalia
- Phylum: Mollusca
- Class: Gastropoda
- Superorder: Sacoglossa
- Family: Hermaeidae
- Genus: Cyerce
- Species: C. elegans

Binomial name
- Cyerce elegans Bergh, 1870

Species of gastropod

Cyerce elegans is a species of sacoglossan sea slug, a shell-less marine opisthobranch gastropod mollusk in the family Caliphyllidae.
