= Aplysiopsis minor =

Scientific classification
- Kingdom: Animalia
- Phylum: Mollusca
- Class: Gastropoda
- Family: Hermaeidae
- Genus: Aplysiopsis
- Species: A. minor

Binomial name
- Aplysiopsis minor (Baba, 1959)

Species of gastropod

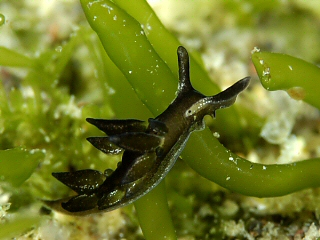

Aplysiopsis minor is a species of sacoglossan sea slug, a shell-less marine opisthobranch gastropod mollusc in the family Hermaeidae.

== Distribution ==
This species is known to occur in Japan.
