= Polybranchia =

Polybranchia may refer to:

- Polybranchia (annelid), genus of polychaetes in the family Spionidae
- Polybranchia (gastropod), genus of sea slugs in the family Caliphyllidae
