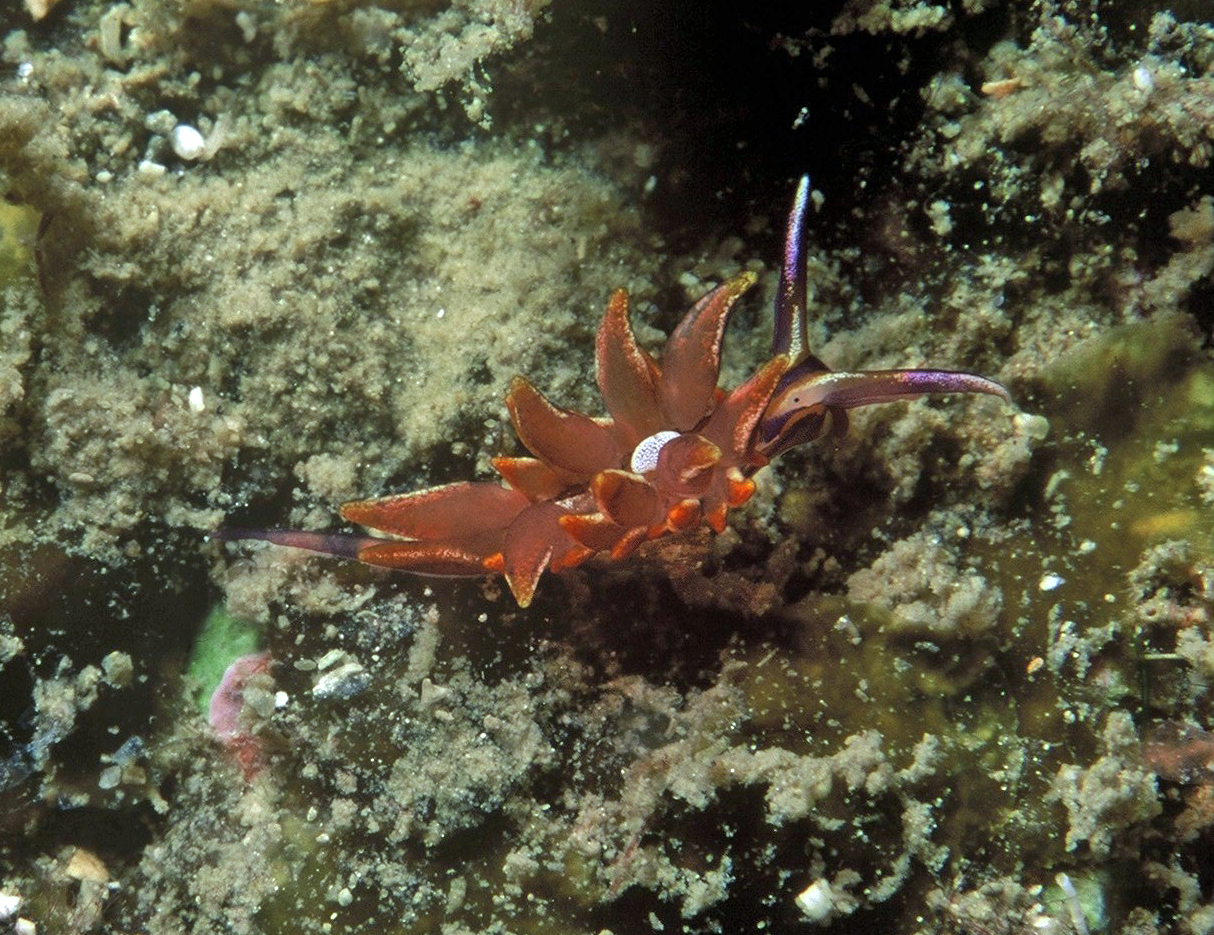
- A live individual of Hermaea variopicta in situ
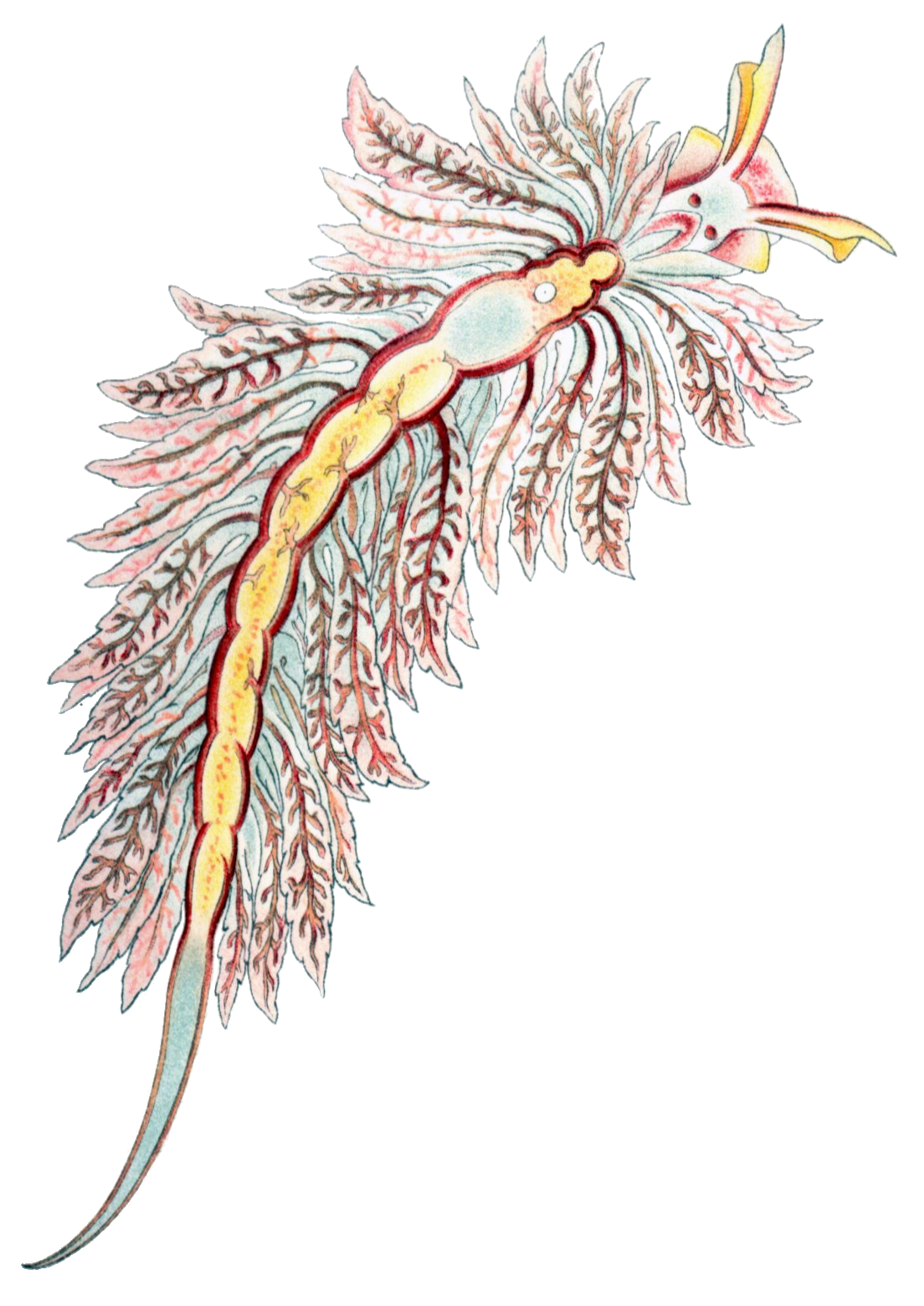
- Drawing of Hermaea bifida from Kunstformen der Natur (1904)

Scientific classification
- Kingdom: Animalia
- Phylum: Mollusca
- Class: Gastropoda
- Superorder: Sacoglossa
- Family: Hermaeidae
- Genus: Hermaea; Lovén, 1844

Type species
- Doris bifida Montagu, 1816

Synonyms
- Hermaeopsis A. Costa, 1869; Physopneumon A. Costa, 1864

= Hermaea (gastropod) =

Genus of gastropods

Hermaea is a genus of sacoglossan sea slugs, a shell-less marine opisthobranch gastropod mollusks in the family Hermaeidae.

Hermaea is the type genus of the family Hermaeidae.

== Species ==
Species within the genus Hermaea include 13 valid species:

- Hermaea bifida (Montagu, 1816)
- Hermaea boucheti Cervera, Garcia-Gomez & Ortea, 1991
- Hermaea coirala Marcus, 1955
- Hermaea cantabra Caballer & Ortea, 2015
- Hermaea coirala Marcus, 1955
- Hermaea conejera Ortea, Moro & Caballer, 2016
- Hermaea cruciata Gould, 1870
- Hermaea cubana Caballer & Ortea, 2013
- Hermaea dakariensis Pruvot-Fol, 1953
- Hermaea evelinemarcusae Jensen, 1993
- Hermaea ghanensis Caballer, Ortea & Moro, 2006
- Hermaea hillae Marcus & Marcus, 1967
- Hermaea minor Bergh, 1888 (taxon inquirendum)
- Hermaea nautica Caballer & Ortea, 2007
- Hermaea noto (Baba, 1959)
- Hermaea oliviae (MacFarland, 1966)
- Hermaea paucicirra Pruvot-Fol, 1953
- Hermaea vancouverensis O'Donoghue, 1924
- Hermaea variopicta (A. Costa, 1869)
- Hermaea wrangeliae (Ichikawa, 1993)
- Hermaea zosterae (Baba, 1959)

Species brought into synonymy

- Hermaea aoteana Powell, 1937: synonym of Placida dendritica (Alder & Hancock, 1843)
- Hermaea brevicornis Costa A., 1867: synonym of Placida dendritica (Alder & Hancock, 1843)
- Hermaea capensis Macnae, 1954: synonym of Placida dendritica (Alder & Hancock, 1843)
- Hermaea carminis Fez, 1962: synonym of Placida cremoniana (Trinchese, 1892)
- Hermaea cremoniana Trinchese, 1892: synonym of Placida cremoniana (Trinchese, 1892)
- Hermaea dendritica (Alder & Hancock, 1843): synonym of Placida dendritica (Alder & Hancock, 1843)
- Hermaea hancockii Trinchese, 1877: synonym of Hermaea bifida (Montagu, 1816)
- Hermaea kingstoni (T. E. Thompson, 1977): synonym of Placida kingstoni T. E. Thompson, 1977
- Hermaea lutescens A. Costa, 1866: synonym of Placida dendritica (Alder & Hancock, 1843)
- Hermaea orbicularis Costa A., 1866: synonym of Placida dendritica (Alder & Hancock, 1843)
- Hermaea ornata MacFarland, 1966: synonym of Placida dendritica (Alder & Hancock, 1843)
- Hermaea polychroma (Hesse, 1873): synonym of Hermaea variopicta (A. Costa, 1869)
- Hermaea saronica Thompson T., 1988: synonym of Placida saronica (T. E. Thompson, 1988)
- Hermaea venosa Lovén, 1845: synonym of Placida dendritica (Alder & Hancock, 1843)
- Hermaea viridis Deshayes, 1857: synonym of Polybranchia viridis (Deshayes, 1857)
