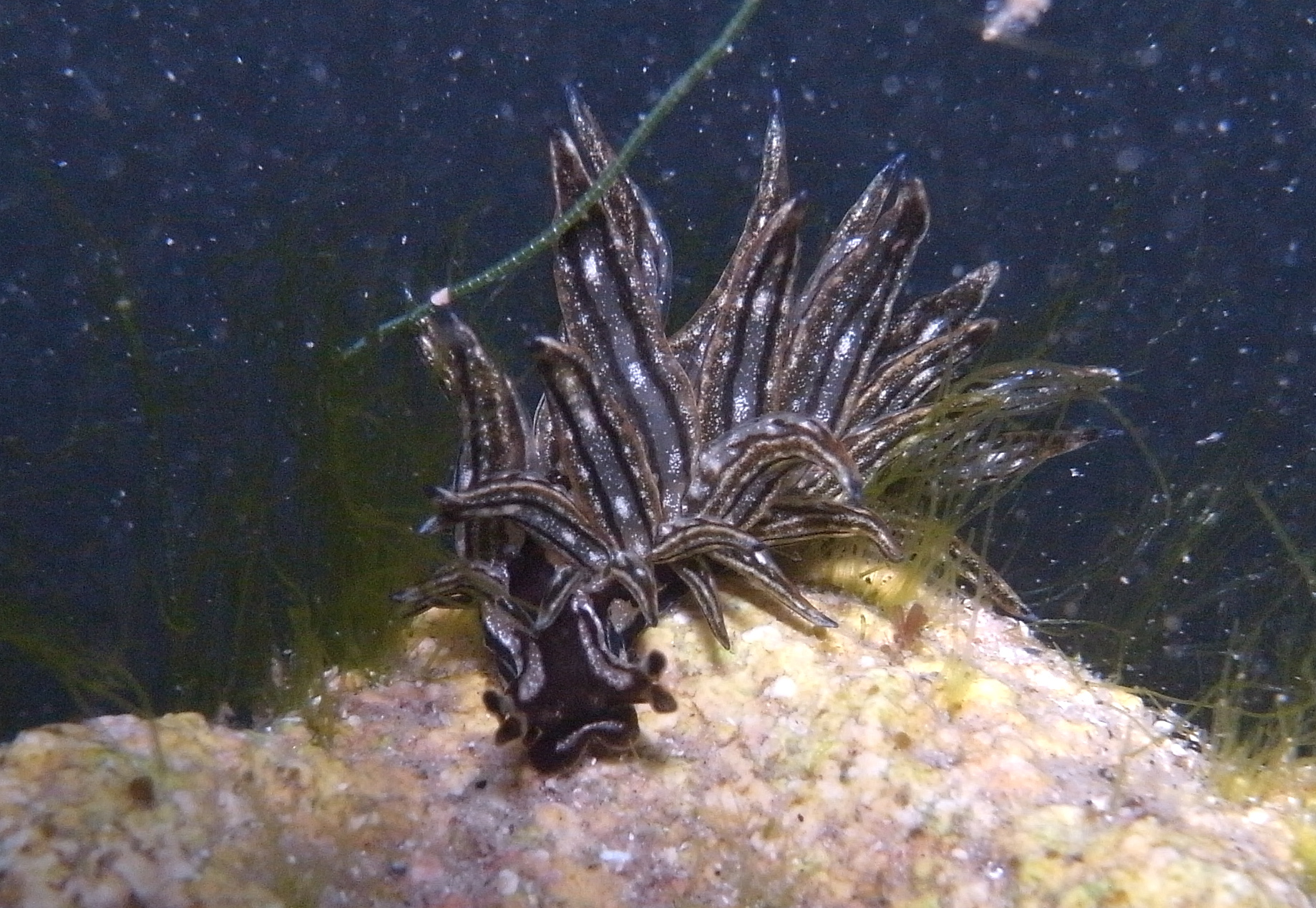

Scientific classification
- Kingdom: Animalia
- Phylum: Mollusca
- Class: Gastropoda
- Superorder: Sacoglossa
- Family: Hermaeidae
- Genus: Aplysiopsis
- Species: A. elegans

Binomial name
- Aplysiopsis elegans (Deshayes, 1835)

Synonyms
- Hermaeina maculosa Trinchese, 1874

= Aplysiopsis elegans =

Species of sea slug

Aplysiopsis elegans is a species of sacoglossan sea slug, a shell-less marine opisthobranch gastropod mollusc in the family Hermaeidae.

== Distribution ==
This species occurs in the Mediterranean Sea and in the Atlantic Ocean off Portugal and Spain.

== Description ==
The body has a length of 10 mm to 12 mm.
