= Hermaea oliviae =

Scientific classification
- Kingdom: Animalia
- Phylum: Mollusca
- Class: Gastropoda
- Superorder: Sacoglossa
- Family: Hermaeidae
- Genus: Hermaea
- Species: H. oliviae

Binomial name
- Hermaea oliviae (MacFarland, 1966)

Synonyms
- Aplysiopsis oliviae

Species of gastropod

Hermaea oliviae is a species of sacoglossan sea slug, a shell-less marine opisthobranch gastropod mollusk in the family Hermaeidae.

== Distribution ==
This species is found from Southern California to British Columbia, Canada.
