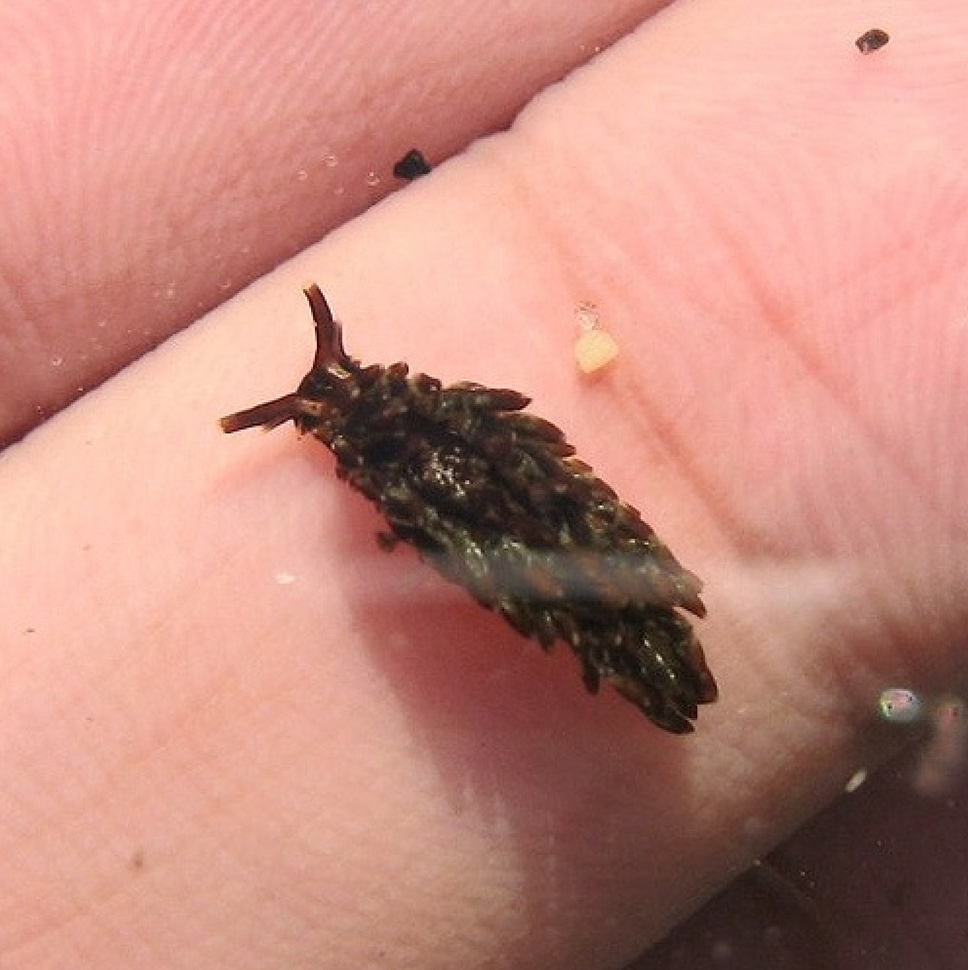

Scientific classification
- Domain: Eukaryota
- Kingdom: Animalia
- Phylum: Mollusca
- Class: Gastropoda
- Family: Hermaeidae
- Genus: Aplysiopsis
- Species: A. brattstroemi

Binomial name
- Aplysiopsis brattstroemi (Marcus, 1959)

= Aplysiopsis brattstroemi =

Species of gastropod

Aplysiopsis brattstroemi is a species of sacoglossan sea slug, a shell-less marine opisthobranch gastropod mollusk in the family Hermaeidae.
