= Hermaea zosterae =

Scientific classification
- Kingdom: Animalia
- Phylum: Mollusca
- Class: Gastropoda
- Family: Hermaeidae
- Genus: Hermaea
- Species: H. zosterae

Binomial name
- Hermaea zosterae (Baba, 1959)

Species of gastropod

Hermaea zosterae is a species of sacoglossan sea slug, a shell-less marine opisthobranch gastropod mollusk in the family Hermaeidae.

== Distribution ==
This species is known to occur in Japan.
