= Hermaea coirala =

Scientific classification
- Domain: Eukaryota
- Kingdom: Animalia
- Phylum: Mollusca
- Class: Gastropoda
- Family: Hermaeidae
- Genus: Hermaea
- Species: H. coirala

Binomial name
- Hermaea coirala (Marcus, 1955)

Species of gastropod

Hermaea coirala is a species of sacoglossan sea slug, a shell-less marine opisthobranch gastropod mollusk in the family Hermaeidae.
