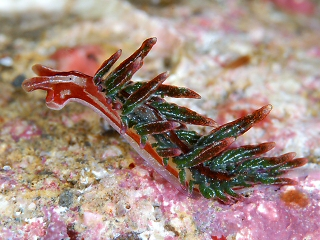

Scientific classification
- Kingdom: Animalia
- Phylum: Mollusca
- Class: Gastropoda
- Family: Hermaeidae
- Genus: Aplysiopsis
- Species: A. toyamana

Binomial name
- Aplysiopsis toyamana (Baba, 1959)

= Aplysiopsis toyamana =

Species of gastropod

Aplysiopsis toyamana is a species of sacoglossan sea slug, a shell-less marine opisthobranch gastropod mollusc in the family Hermaeidae.
