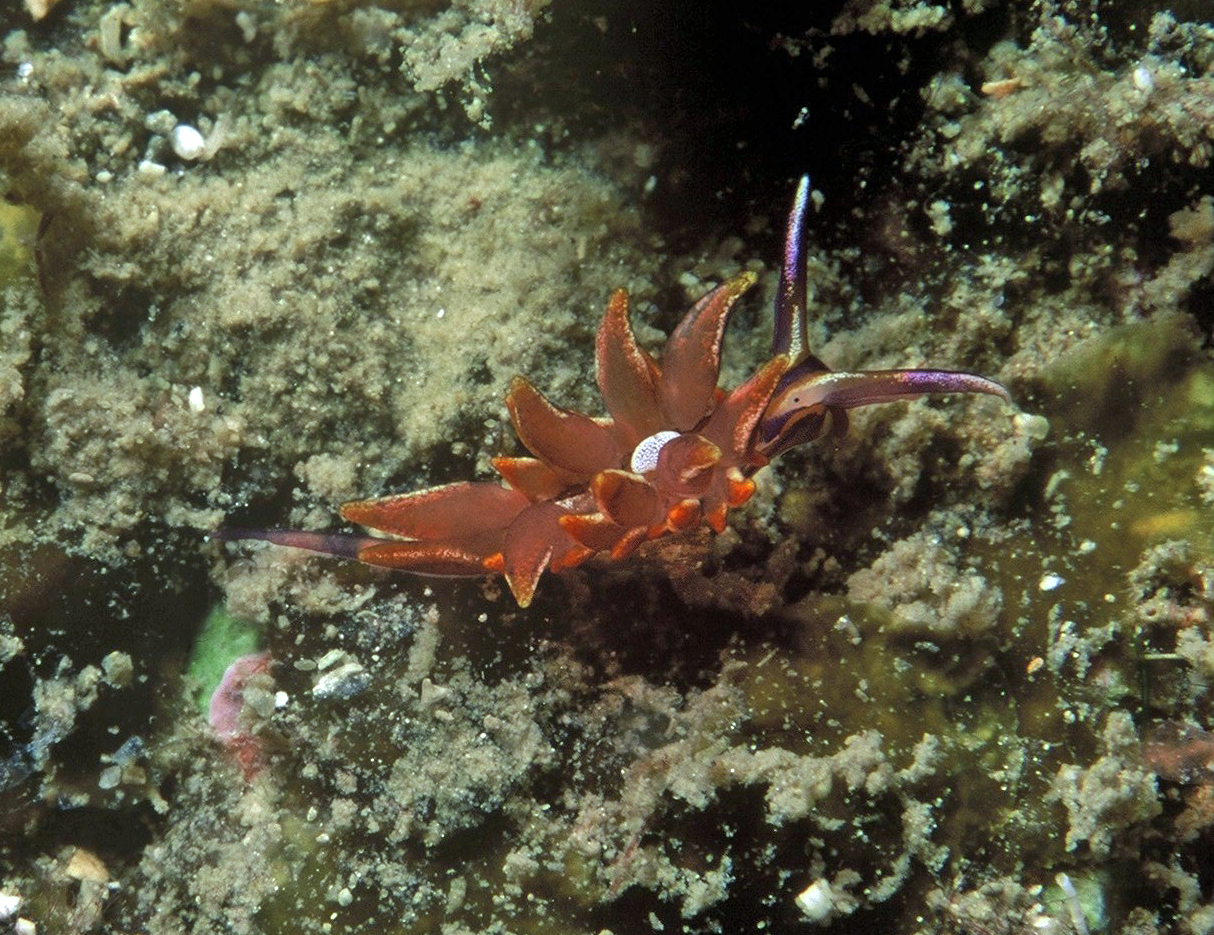

Scientific classification
- Kingdom: Animalia
- Phylum: Mollusca
- Class: Gastropoda
- Superorder: Sacoglossa
- Family: Hermaeidae
- Genus: Hermaea
- Species: H. variopicta

Binomial name
- Hermaea variopicta (A. Costa, 1869)

= Hermaea variopicta =

Species of gastropod

Hermaea variopicta is a species of sacoglossan sea slug, a shell-less marine opisthobranch gastropod mollusk in the family) Hermaeidae.

== Distribution ==
This species is known to occur in the Mediterranean, Morocco, the Atlantic coast of France and southwestern England.
