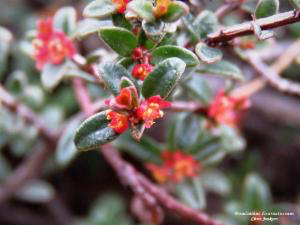

Scientific classification
- Kingdom: Plantae
- Clade: Tracheophytes
- Clade: Angiosperms
- Clade: Eudicots
- Clade: Rosids
- Order: Malpighiales
- Family: Picrodendraceae
- Genus: Pseudanthus
- Species: P. divaricatissimus

Binomial name
- Pseudanthus divaricatissimus (Müll.Arg.) Benth.

= Pseudanthus divaricatissimus =

Species of shrub

Pseudanthus divaricatissimus is a species of flowering plant in the family Picrodendraceae and grows in scattered locations in central New South Wales and Tasmania, Australia. It is a decumbent to spreading shrub with pale red flowers.

== Description ==
Pseudanthus divaricatissimus is a small decumbent or spreading shrub with stems up to 20 cm (7.9 in) long that are smooth to minutely covered with short, hard hairs. The leaves are arranged alternately or decussate oblong to oval-shaped, mostly 3–5.5 mm (0.12–0.22 in) long, 1.5–2 mm (0.059–0.079 in) wide and the apex blunt and recurved. The male flowers are pale red, pedicel 0.7–1.2 mm (0.028–0.047 in) long, perianth segments 0.8–1.5 mm (0.031–0.059 in) long, female segments, reddish and 1.2–1.6 mm (0.047–0.063 in) long. Flowering occurs in spring and the fruit is an oval-shaped capsule 4–4.5 mm (0.16–0.18 in) long, smooth and speckled red and green.

== Taxonomy and naming ==
This species was first formally described in 1863 by Johannes Müller Argoviensis who gave it the name Caletia divaricatissima. In 1873, George Bentham changed the name to Pseudanthus divaricatissimus and published the description in Flora Australiensis.

== Distribution and habitat ==
Pseudanthus divaricatissimus grows on sandy soils in rocky locations from Muswellbrook to Bega, Urbenville and Dubbo also in Tasmania.
