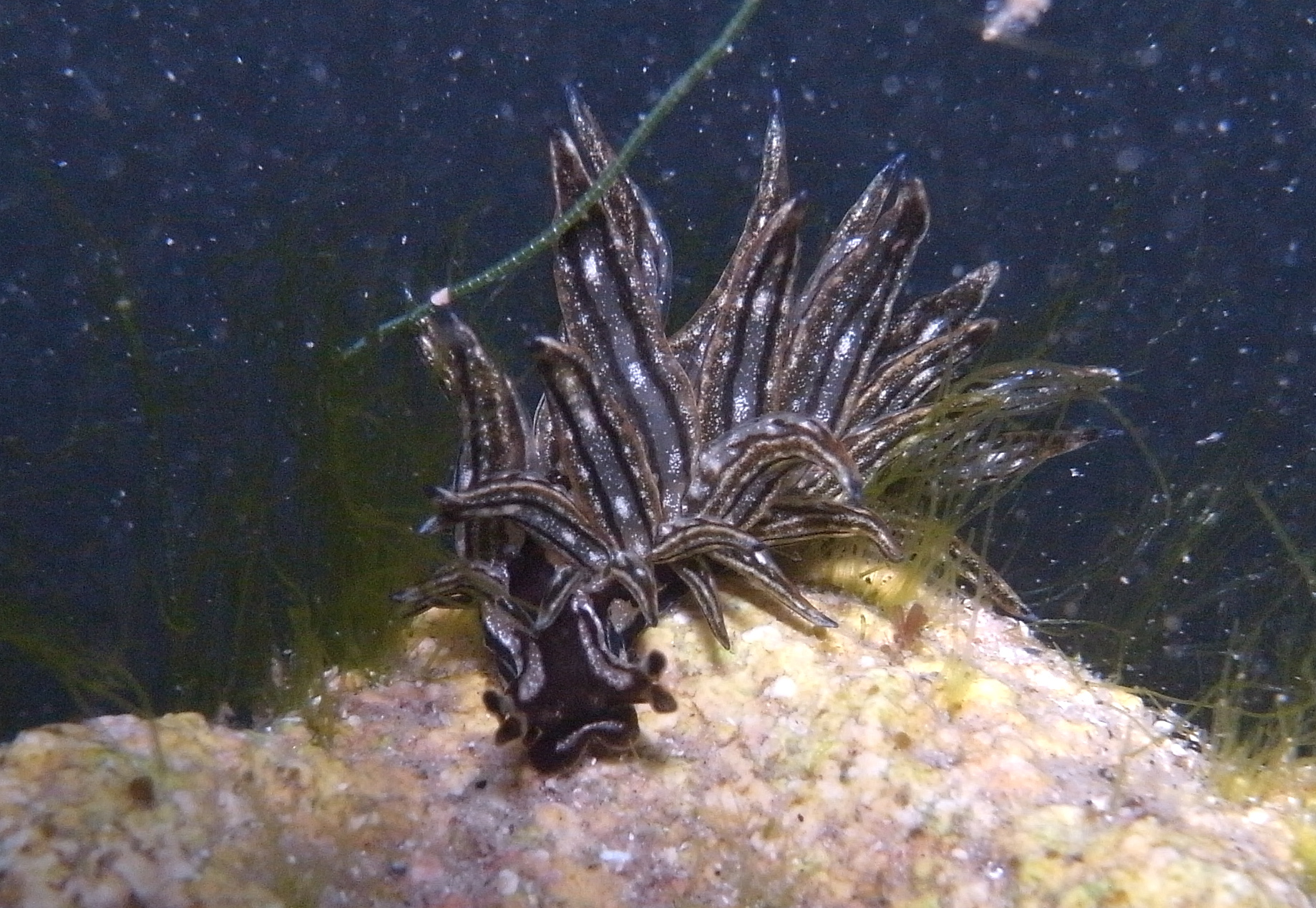
- Aplysiopsis elegans

Scientific classification
- Kingdom: Animalia
- Phylum: Mollusca
- Class: Gastropoda
- Family: Hermaeidae
- Genus: Aplysiopsis; Deshayes, 1857

= Aplysiopsis =

Genus of gastropods

Aplysiopsis is a genus of sacoglossan sea slugs, a shell-less marine opisthobranch gastropod mollusks in the family Hermaeidae.

== Species ==
Species within the genus Aplysiopsis include 9 valid species:

- Aplysiopsis brattstroemi (Marcus, 1959)
- Aplysiopsis elegans (Deshayes, 1835)
- Aplysiopsis enteromorphae (Cockerell & Eliot, 1905)
- Aplysiopsis formosa (Pruvot-Fol, 1953)
- Aplysiopsis minor (Baba, 1959)
- Aplysiopsis nigra (Baba, 1949)
- Aplysiopsis orientalis (Baba, 1949)
- Aplysiopsis sinusmensalis (Macnae, 1954)
- Aplysiopsis toyamana (Baba, 1959)

Invalid species named Aplysiopsis include:

- Aplysiopsis maculosa (Trinchese, 1874)
- Aplysiopsis smithi (Marcus, 1961)
- Aplysiopsis zebra (Clark, 1982)
