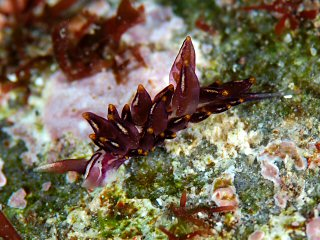

Scientific classification
- Kingdom: Animalia
- Phylum: Mollusca
- Class: Gastropoda
- Family: Hermaeidae
- Genus: Hermaea
- Species: H. noto

Binomial name
- Hermaea noto (Baba, 1959)

= Hermaea noto =

Species of gastropod

Hermaea noto is a species of sacoglossan sea slug, a shell-less marine opisthobranch gastropod mollusk in the family Hermaeidae.
