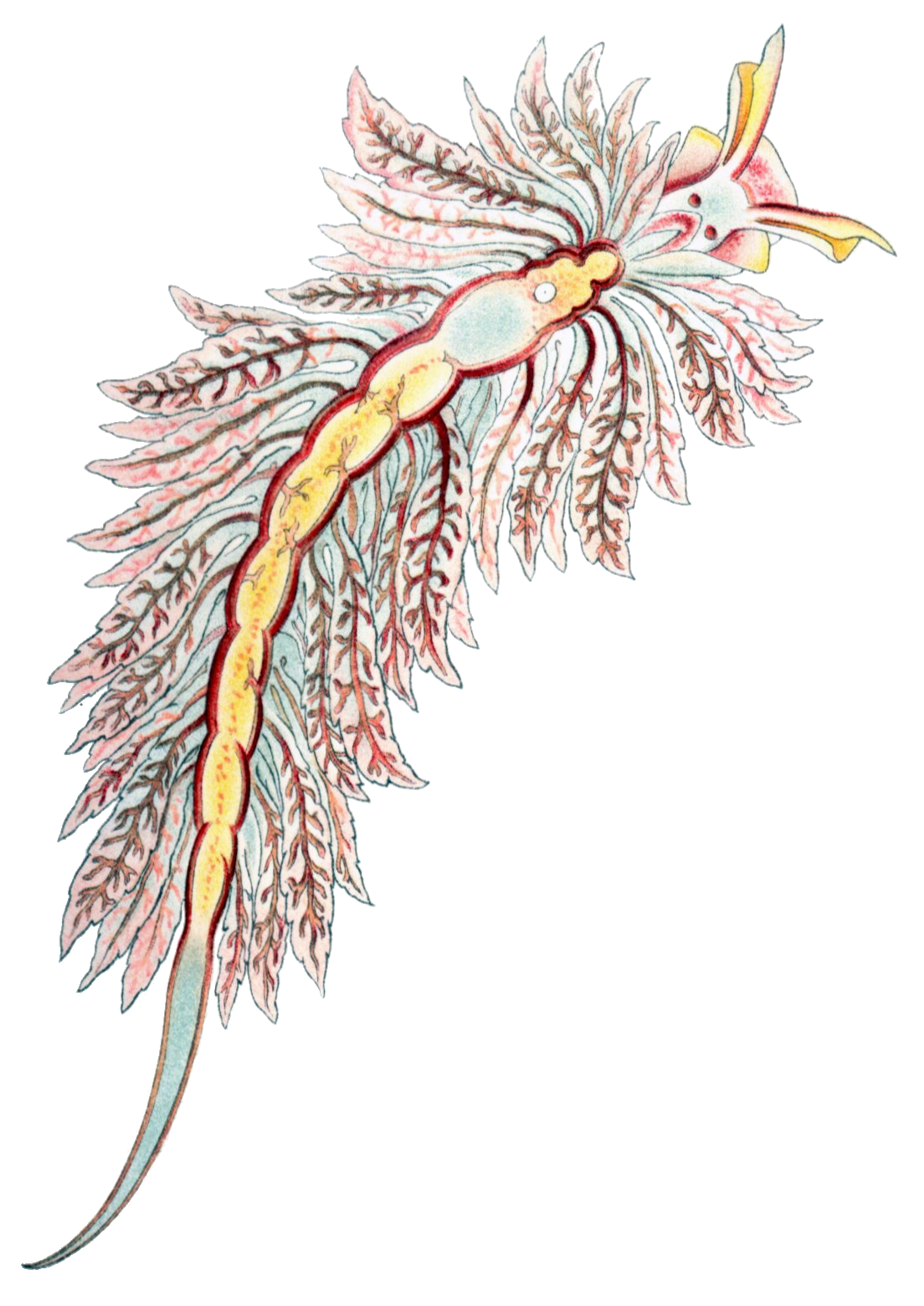
- Drawing of Hermaea bifida from Kunstformen der Natur (1904)

Scientific classification
- Domain: Eukaryota
- Kingdom: Animalia
- Phylum: Mollusca
- Class: Gastropoda
- Family: Hermaeidae
- Genus: Hermaea
- Species: H. bifida

Binomial name
- Hermaea bifida (Montagu, 1815)

Synonyms
- Doris bifida Montagu, 1815; Hermaea hancockii Trinchese, 1877; Physopneumon carneum A. Costa, 1864; Physopneumon corneus [sic] (misspelling)

= Hermaea bifida =

Species of gastropod

Hermaea bifida is a species of sacoglossan sea slug, a shell-less marine opisthobranch gastropod mollusk in the family Hermaeidae.

== Distribution ==
The type locality for this species is the coast of Devon, South West England, United Kingdom. It occurs also in the North Atlantic Ocean and in the Caribbean Sea.
