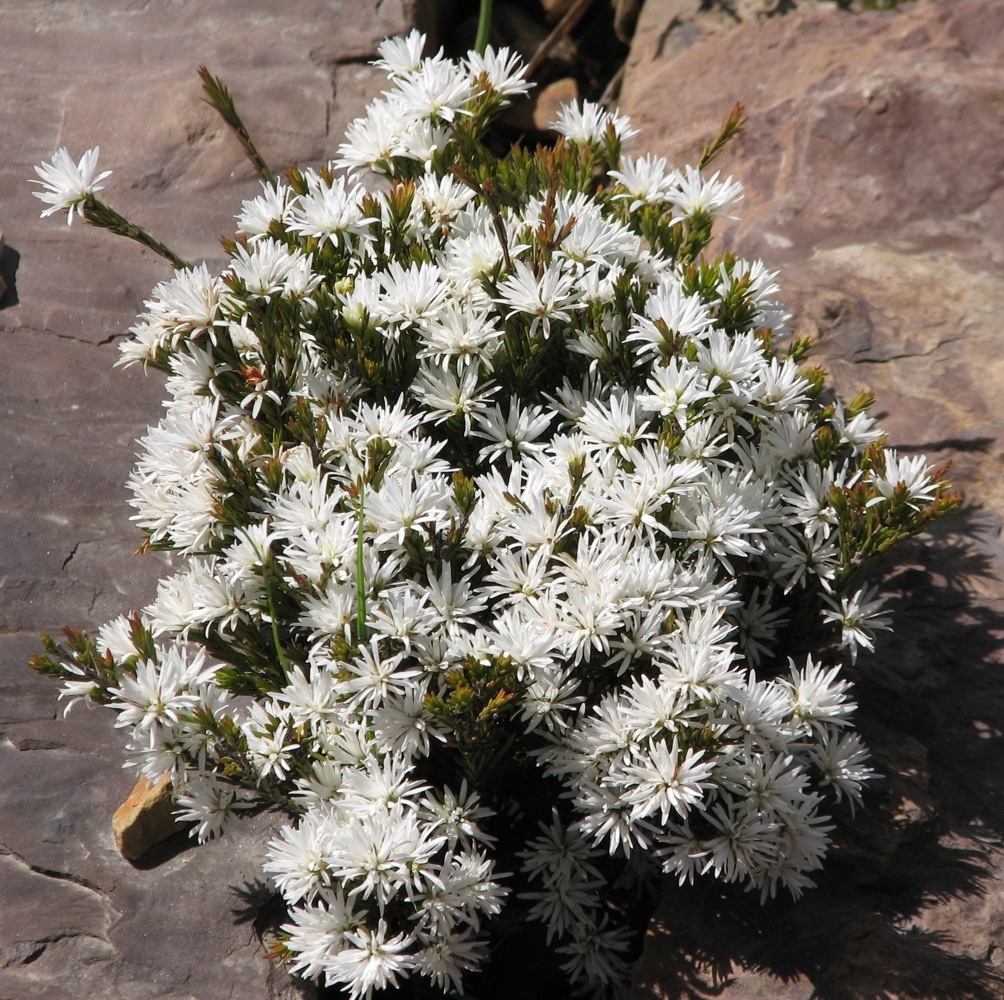
- Male flowers

Scientific classification
- Kingdom: Plantae
- Clade: Tracheophytes
- Clade: Angiosperms
- Clade: Eudicots
- Clade: Rosids
- Order: Malpighiales
- Family: Picrodendraceae
- Genus: Pseudanthus
- Species: P. pimeleoides

Binomial name
- Pseudanthus pimeleoides Sieber ex Spreng.

= Pseudanthus pimeleoides =

Species of shrub

Pseudanthus pimeleoides is a species of flowering plant in the family Picrodendraceae and is endemic to New South Wales. It is a monoecious shrub with crowded, linear to narrowly egg-shaped leaves and creamy white male flowers and inconspicuous female arranged singly in upper leaf axils, but appearing clustered on the ends of branches.

== Description ==
Pseudanthus pimeleoides is a compact shrub that typically grows to a height of up to 60 cm (24 in) and has many glabrous branchlets. The leaves are linear to narrowly egg-shaped, 7–13 mm (0.28–0.51 in) long and 1.0–1.7 mm (0.039–0.067 in) wide on a petiole 0.4–1 mm (0.016–0.039 in) long with reddish-brown, narrowly triangular or broadly egg-shaped stipules 1.0–1.3 mm (0.039–0.051 in) long at the base. The leaves are glabrous and the mid-rib is conspicuous on the lower surface. The flowers are arranged singly in upper leaf axils with bracts 1.0–1.3 mm (0.039–0.051 in) long at the base, but appear to be clustered on the ends of branches. Male flowers are on a pedicel 2–5 mm (0.079–0.197 in) long, the 6 tepals creamy white, 5–12 mm (0.20–0.47 in) long and 0.7–1.6 mm (0.028–0.063 in) wide and there are 6 stamens. Female flowers are sessile, the 6 tepals, 1.4–3 mm (0.055–0.118 in) long and 0.5–0.8 mm (0.020–0.031 in) wide. Flowering has been observed from February to November, and the fruit is a more or less spherical capsule about 4 mm (0.16 in) long and 2.1 mm (0.083 in) wide.

== Taxonomy and naming ==
Pseudanthus pimeleoides was first formally described in 1827 by Kurt Polycarp Joachim Sprengel in Systema Vegetabilium from an unpublished description by August Siebert. The specific epithet (pimeleoides) means "Pimelea-like".

== Distribution and habitat ==
Pseudanthus pimeleoides grows in sandy soil in moist gullies From Colo Heights to Bargo, with a few records from the upper Hunter Valley, in the Sydney region of New South Wales.
