= Pseudanthus ballingalliae =

Scientific classification
- Kingdom: Plantae
- Clade: Tracheophytes
- Clade: Angiosperms
- Clade: Eudicots
- Clade: Rosids
- Order: Malpighiales
- Family: Picrodendraceae
- Genus: Pseudanthus
- Species: P. ballingalliae

Binomial name
- Pseudanthus ballingalliae Halford & R.J.F.Hend.

Species of shrub

Pseudanthus ballingalliae is a species of flowering plant in the family Picrodendraceae and is endemic to Queensland. It is a monoecious shrub with simple, oblong to narrowly oblong leaves and small yellow male and green female flowers arranged singly in upper leaf axils, but appearing clustered on the ends of branches.

== Description ==
Pseudanthus ballingalliae is an openly-branched shrub that typically grows to a height of up to 1.5 m (4 ft 11 in) and has glabrous, upwardly directed branchlets. The leaves are decussate, oblong to narrowly oblong, mostly 2.8–7 mm (0.11–0.28 in) long and 1.0–1.8 mm (0.039–0.071 in) wide on a petiole 0.4–0.6 mm (0.016–0.024 in) long with reddish-brown, triangular stipules at the base. The leaves are mostly glabrous. The flowers are arranged singly in upper leaf axils with small bracts at the base, but appear to be clustered on the ends of branches. Male flowers are on a pedicel about 0.5 mm (0.020 in) long, the tepals yellow, 0.9–1 mm (0.035–0.039 in) long and 0.6–0.9 mm (0.024–0.035 in) wide and there are 3 to 5 stamens. Female flowers are sessile, the tepals greenish, 1.2–1.8 mm (0.047–0.071 in) long and 0.7–1 mm (0.028–0.039 in) wide. Flowering has been observed in September and October, and the fruit is a narrowly oval capsule 4.0–5.3 mm (0.16–0.21 in) long.

== Taxonomy and naming ==
Pseudanthus ballingalliae was first formally described in 2003 by David Halford and Rodney Henderson in the journal Austrobaileya from specimens collected by Halford in Expedition National Park in 1999. The specific epithet (ballingalliae) honours "Ms M.E. (Betty) Ballingall (1920–1998)".

== Distribution and habitat ==
Pseudanthus ballingalliae grows in shallow, sandy soil in forest or woodland on steep slopes and in gorges in the Carnarvon and Expedition National Parks.
