= Pseudanthus micranthus =

Scientific classification
- Kingdom: Plantae
- Clade: Tracheophytes
- Clade: Angiosperms
- Clade: Eudicots
- Clade: Rosids
- Order: Malpighiales
- Family: Picrodendraceae
- Genus: Pseudanthus
- Species: P. micranthus

Binomial name
- Pseudanthus micranthus Benth.

Species of shrub

Pseudanthus micranthus, commonly known as fringed pseudanthus, is a species of flowering plant in the family Picrodendraceae and is endemic to the south-east of South Australia. It is a compact, monoecious shrub with simple, egg-shaped to round leaves and yellow flowers arranged in leaf axils, but appearing clustered on the ends of branches.

== Description ==
Pseudanthus micranthus is a compact, monoecious shrub that typically grows to a height of 10–30 cm (3.9–11.8 in) and is intricately branched. Its leaves are egg-shaped to round, 1.7–6 mm (0.067–0.236 in) long and 1.2–2.7 mm (0.047–0.106 in) wide on a petiole 0.3–0.4 mm (0.012–0.016 in) long with reddish-brown, triangular to thread-like stipules 0.4–1 mm (0.016–0.039 in) long at the base. The leaves are glabrous. The flowers are arranged in groups of several to many on the ends of branches with bracts about 0.5 mm (0.020 in) long at the base. Male flowers are on a pedicel 0.4–1.3 mm (0.016–0.051 in) long, the 6 tepals yellowish with a red tinge, 0.6–1.6 mm (0.024–0.063 in) long and 0.5–1 mm (0.020–0.039 in) wide and there are usually 3 stamens. Female flowers are sessile, the 4 to 6 tepals yellows with reddish-brown edges, 1.1–1.5 mm (0.043–0.059 in) long and 0.8–1 mm (0.031–0.039 in) wide. Flowering has been observed in January and from April to November, and the fruit is an oval capsule 3.5–5.5 mm (0.14–0.22 in) long.

== Taxonomy and naming ==
Pseudanthus micranthus was first formally described in 1873 by George Bentham in Flora Australiensis from specimens collected near Adelaide by Joseph Whittaker. The specific epithet (micranthus) means small and prickly.

== Distribution and habitat ==
Pseudanthus micranthus grows in shrubland, heath and mallee in the Mount Lofty Ranges and on Kangaroo Island in the south-east of South Australia.
