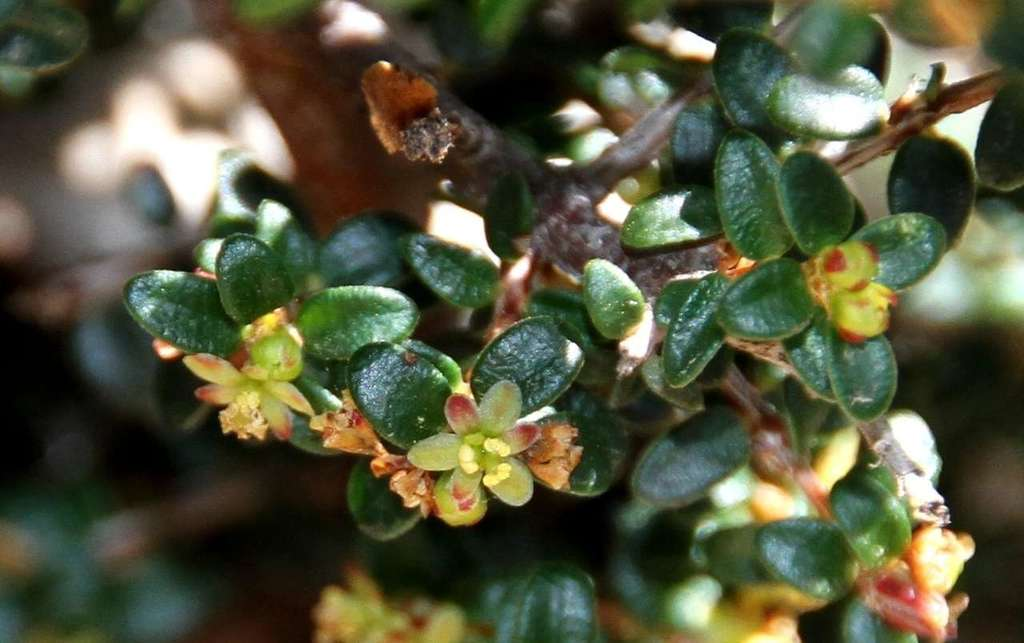

Scientific classification
- Kingdom: Plantae
- Clade: Tracheophytes
- Clade: Angiosperms
- Clade: Eudicots
- Clade: Rosids
- Order: Malpighiales
- Family: Picrodendraceae
- Genus: Pseudanthus
- Species: P. orbicularis

Binomial name
- Pseudanthus orbicularis (Mull.Arg.) Halford & R.J.F.Hend.

= Pseudanthus orbicularis =

Species of shrub

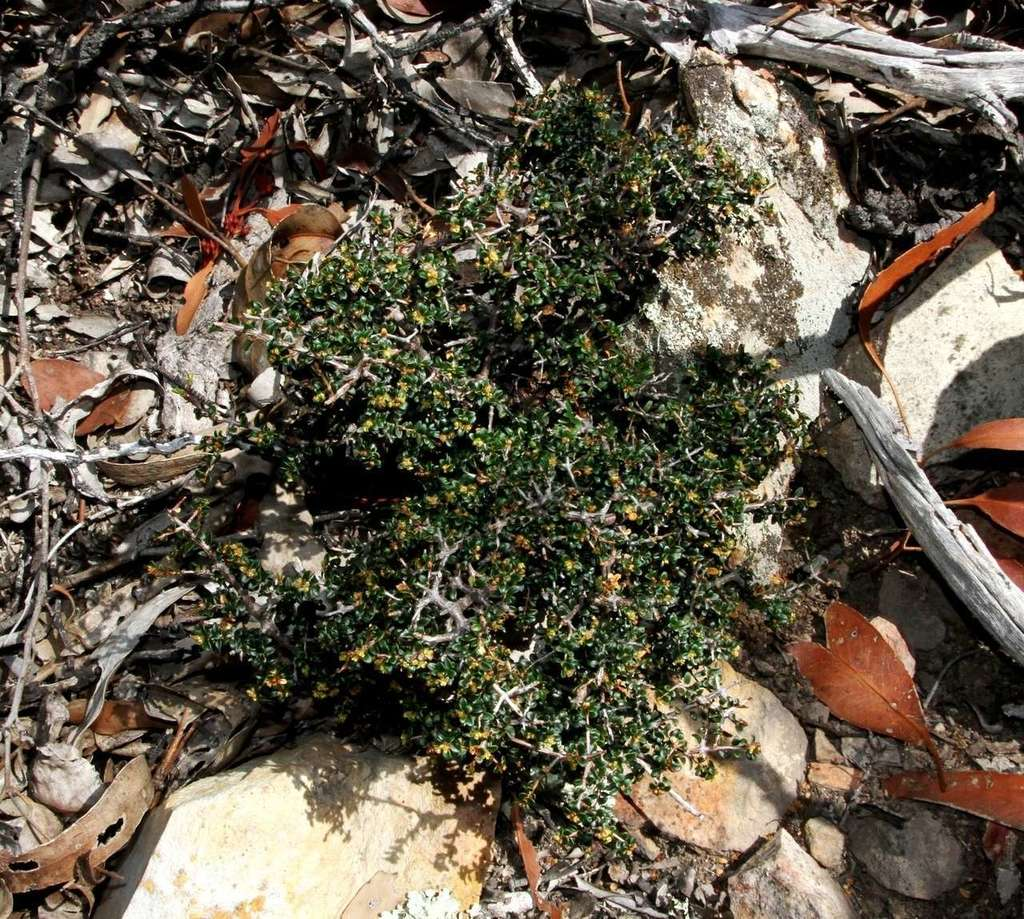
Habit in Ingliston Gorge, near Ballan

Pseudanthus orbicularis is a species of flowering plant in the family Picrodendraceae and is endemic to south-eastern continental Australia. It is a compact, monoecious shrub with simple, broadly elliptic to round leaves and creamy white, red or pale red flowers arranged singly in upper leaf axils.

== Description ==
Pseudanthus orbicularis is a compact, monoecious shrub that typically grows up to 1.5 m (4 ft 11 in) high and wide, and has glabrous branchlets. The leaves are broadly elliptic to round, 1.4–3.6 mm (0.055–0.142 in) long and 1.2–2.3 mm (0.047–0.091 in) wide on a petiole 0.2–0.6 mm (0.0079–0.0236 in) long with reddish-brown, triangular stipules 0.4–0.7 mm (0.016–0.028 in) long at the base. The flowers are arranged singly in upper leaf axils with bracts 0.3–0.5 mm (0.012–0.020 in) long at the base. Male flowers are on a pedicel 0.4–0.6 mm (0.016–0.024 in) long, the 6 tepals creamy white or red, 0.9–1.3 mm (0.035–0.051 in) long and 0.5–0.8 mm (0.020–0.031 in) wide and there are 6 stamens. Female flowers are sessile, the 5 or 6 tepals pale red, 1.4–1.7 mm (0.055–0.067 in) long and 0.6–0.9 mm (0.024–0.035 in) wide. Flowering occurs in most months, and the fruit is a narrowly oval capsule 3.8–4.5 mm (0.15–0.18 in) long.

== Taxonomy and naming ==
This species was first formally described in 1864 by Johannes Müller Argoviensis who gave it the name Caletia divaricatissima var. orbicularis in Flora: oder Allgemeine Botanischer Zeitung from specimens collected by Ferdinand von Mueller. In 2003, David Halford and Rodney Henderson raised the variety to species status as Pseudanthus orbicularis in the journal Austrobaileya. The specific epithet (orbicularis) means orbicular.

== Distribution and habitat ==
Pseudanthus orbicularis grows in rocky places on hills and ridges in shrubland, low woodland and shrubby open forest. It grows in disjunct populations on the Central Western Slopes and South Coast of New South Wales and scattered places, mainly in eastern Victoria. It is listed as "vulnerable" in Victoria, under the Flora and Fauna Guarantee Act 1988.
