= Pseudanthus pauciflorus =

Scientific classification
- Kingdom: Plantae
- Clade: Tracheophytes
- Clade: Angiosperms
- Clade: Eudicots
- Clade: Rosids
- Order: Malpighiales
- Family: Picrodendraceae
- Genus: Pseudanthus
- Species: P. pauciflorus

Binomial name
- Pseudanthus pauciflorus Halford & R.J.F.Hend.

Species of shrub

Pseudanthus pauciflorus is a species of flowering plant in the family Picrodendraceae and is endemic to eastern Australia. It is a compact, monoecious shrub with simple, lance-shaped or narrowly elliptic to narrowly oblong leaves and creamy white flowers arranged singly in upper leaf axils, but appearing clustered on the ends of branches.

== Description ==
Pseudanthus pauciflorus is a compact, monoecious shrub that typically grows to a height of up to 60 cm (24 in) and has upright to erect stems. The leaves are narrowly elliptic to narrowly oblong, 3.5–14 mm (0.14–0.55 in) long and 1.0–2.2 mm (0.039–0.087 in) wide on a petiole 0.5–0.8 mm (0.020–0.031 in) long with reddish-brown, triangular to broadly egg-shaped stipules 0.8–1.3 mm (0.031–0.051 in) long at the base. The leaves are glabrous. The flowers are arranged singly in upper leaf axils with bracts 1–3 mm (0.039–0.118 in) long at the base, but appear to be clustered on the ends of branches. Male flowers are on pedicels 0.7–2.3 mm (0.028–0.091 in) long, the 6 tepals creamy white, 2.7–4.8 mm (0.11–0.19 in) long and 0.6–1.2 mm (0.024–0.047 in) wide, and there are 6 stamens. Female flowers are sessile, the 4 to 6 tepals usually reddish-brown, 0.5–4 mm (0.020–0.157 in) long and 0.2–0.8 mm (0.0079–0.0315 in) wide. Flowering time varies with subspecies, and the fruit is an oval capsule 2.7–4 mm (0.11–0.16 in) long and 1.5–2.5 mm (0.059–0.098 in) wide.

== Taxonomy and naming ==
Pseudanthus pauciflorus was first formally described in 2003 by David Halford and Rodney Henderson in the journal Austrobaileya from specimens collected by Halford near Rathdowney in 2001. The specific epithet (pauciflorus) means "few-flowered".

In the same journal, Halford and Henderson described two subspecies of P. pauciflorus, and the names are accepted by the Australian Plant Census:

- Pseudanthus pauciflorus subsp. arenicola Halford & R.J.F.Hend. has its male flowers on pedicles 1.2–2.2 mm (0.047–0.087 in) long, the tepals of the female flowers 0.5–2.9 mm (0.020–0.114 in) long, with flowers collected sporadically throughout the year.
- Pseudanthus pauciflorus subsp. pauciflorus Halford & R.J.F.Hend. has its male flowers on pedicles 0.7–1.1 mm (0.028–0.043 in) long, the tepals of the female flowers 3–4 mm (0.12–0.16 in) long and flowers in March, April and from September to November.

== Distribution and habitat ==
Subspecies arenicola grows in heath and open forest in the Blackdown Tableland National Park and Robinson Gorge in the Expedition Range. Subspecies pauciflorus grows in heath, shrubland and open forest in rocky places from near Rathdowney in south-eastern Queensland to Port Macquarie and as far west as Torrington in north-eastern New South Wales.
