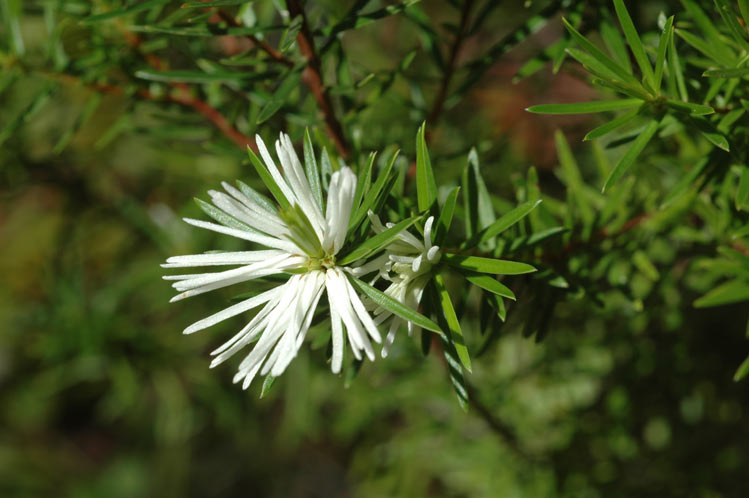
- Subspecies ligulatus in the ANBG

Scientific classification
- Kingdom: Plantae
- Clade: Tracheophytes
- Clade: Angiosperms
- Clade: Eudicots
- Clade: Rosids
- Order: Malpighiales
- Family: Picrodendraceae
- Genus: Pseudanthus
- Species: P. ligulatus

Binomial name
- Pseudanthus ligulatus Halford & R.J.F.Hend.

= Pseudanthus ligulatus =

Species of shrub

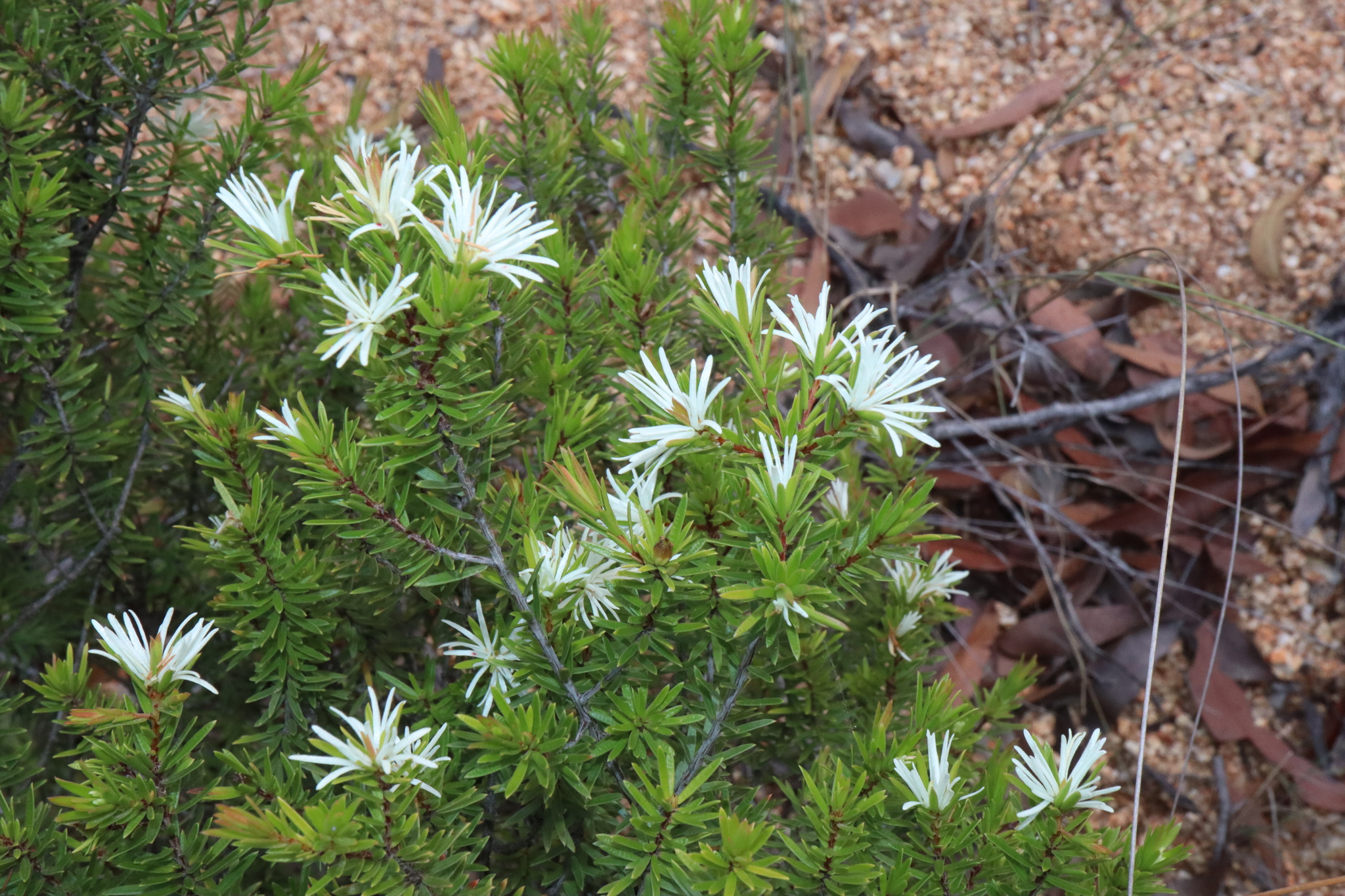
Habit in Dinden National Park

Pseudanthus ligulatus is a species of flowering plant in the family Picrodendraceae and is endemic to northern Queensland in Australia. It is a monoecious shrub with simple, lance-shaped or linear to narrowly oblong leaves and creamy white male and pale green female flowers arranged singly in upper leaf axils, but appearing clustered on the ends of branches.

== Description ==
Pseudanthus ligulatus is a shrub that typically grows to a height of 0.5–1.5 m (1 ft 8 in – 4 ft 11 in) and has glabrous branchlets. The leaves are lance-shaped or linear to narrowly oblong, 7–12 mm (0.28–0.47 in) long and 1.1–1.8 mm (0.043–0.071 in) wide on a petiole 0.5–1.1 mm (0.020–0.043 in) long with reddish-brown, triangular or egg-shaped stipules 0.5–1.3 mm (0.020–0.051 in) long at the base. The leaves are glabrous. The flowers are arranged singly in upper leaf axils with bracts 0.5–1 mm (0.020–0.039 in) long at the base, but appear to be clustered on the ends of branches. Male flowers are on a pedicel 0.5–1.8 mm (0.020–0.071 in) long, the 6 tepals creamy white, 7–15 mm (0.28–0.59 in) long and 0.5–0.9 mm (0.020–0.035 in) wide and there are 6 stamens. Female flowers are sessile, the tepals pale green, 1.2–3.7 mm (0.047–0.146 in) long and 0.6–1 mm (0.024–0.039 in) wide. Flowering occurs in most months, and the fruit is an oval capsule 5.8–7 mm (0.23–0.28 in) long.

== Taxonomy and naming ==
Pseudanthus ligulatus was first formally described in 2003 by David Halford and Rodney Henderson in the journal Austrobaileya from specimens collected near Mareeba in 1989. The specific epithet (ligulatus) means ligulate, referring to the tongue-like tepals.

In the same journal, Halford and Henderson described two subspecies of P. ligulatus, and the names are accepted by the Australian Plant Census:

- Pseudanthus ligulatus subsp. ligulatus Halford & R.J.F.Hend. is a shrub up to 1.5 m (4 ft 11 in) high with its leaves evenly distributed along the branchlets, the tepals of female flowers more than 2 mm (0.079 in) long.
- Pseudanthus ligulatus subsp. volcanicus Halford & R.J.F.Hend. is a shrub up to 0.5 m (1 ft 8 in) high with crowded leaves, the tepals of female flowers less than 2 mm (0.079 in) long.

== Distribution and habitat ==
Pseudanthus ligulatus grows in heath, woodland or forest, rarely in rainforest. Subspecies ligulatus occurs from the Mareeba district, south to Charters Towers and east to the Cumberland Islands in northern Queensland. Subspecies volcanicus is restricted to the Glasshouse Mountains in south-east Queensland, where it grows in rock crevices and on cliff faces.

== Conservation status ==
Pseudanthus ligulatus is listed as of "least concern" by the Queensland Government Nature Conservation Act 1992.
