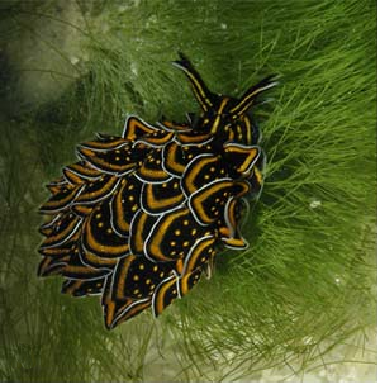
- Cyerce nigricans on Chlorodesmis fastigiata. Locality: Lizard Island, Great Barrier Reef. The length of the slug is about 4 cm.

Scientific classification
- Kingdom: Animalia
- Phylum: Mollusca
- Class: Gastropoda
- Superorder: Sacoglossa
- Family: Hermaeidae
- Genus: Cyerce; Bergh, 1871

Type species
- Cyerce elegans Bergh, 1870

= Cyerce =

Genus of gastropods

Cyerce is a genus of sacoglossan sea slugs, a shell-less marine opisthobranch gastropod mollusks in the family Caliphyllidae.

== Species ==
- Cyerce antillensis Engel, 1927
- Cyerce basi Moreno et al, 2025
- Cyerce blackburnae Moreno et al, 2025
- Cyerce bourbonica Yonow, 2012
- Cyerce cristallina (Trinchese, 1881)
- Cyerce edmundsi Thompson, 1977
- Cyerce elegans Bergh, 1870
- Cyerce goodheartae Moreno et al, 2025
- Cyerce graeca Thompson T., 1988
- Cyerce habanensis Ortea & Templado, 1988
- Cyerce kikutarobabai Hamatani, 1976
- Cyerce katiae Moreno et al, 2025
- Cyerce liliuokalaniae Moreno et al, 2025
- Cyerce nigra Bergh, 1871
- Cyerce nigricans (Pease, 1866)
- Cyerce orteai Valdés & Camacho-Garcia, 2000
- Cyerce pavonina Bergh, 1888
- Cyerce takanoi Moreno et al, 2025
- Cyerce trowbridgeae Moreno et al, 2025
- Cyerce tutela Moreno et al, 2025
- Cyerce verdensis Ortea & Templado, 1990
- Cyerce whaapi Moreno et al, 2025
