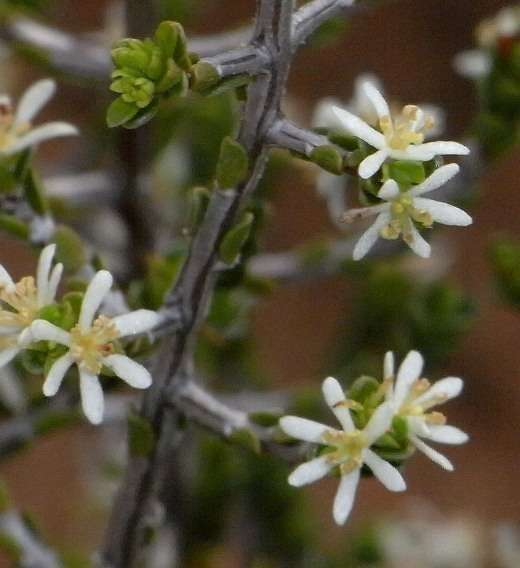
- Near Kamarooka

Scientific classification
- Kingdom: Plantae
- Clade: Tracheophytes
- Clade: Angiosperms
- Clade: Eudicots
- Clade: Rosids
- Order: Malpighiales
- Family: Picrodendraceae
- Genus: Pseudanthus
- Species: P. ovalifolius

Binomial name
- Pseudanthus ovalifolius F.Muell.

Synonyms
- Caletia ovalifolia (F.Muell.) Müll.Arg.; Caletia wilhelmi Müll.Arg. nom. inval., pro syn.

= Pseudanthus ovalifolius =

Species of shrub

Pseudanthus ovalifolius, commonly known as oval-leaf pseudanthus, is a species of flowering plant in the family Picrodendraceae and is endemic to south-eastern Australia. It is a spreading to compact, wiry, monoecious shrub with oval leaves and whitish flowers arranged singly in upper leaf axils, but sometimes appearing clustered on the ends of branches.

== Description ==
Pseudanthus ovalifolius is a spreading to compact, wiry monoecious shrub that typically grows to a height of 30 cm (12 in) and has glabrous branchlets. Its leaves are oval, elliptic or more or less round, 2.2–5.0 mm (0.087–0.197 in) long and 1.0–2.1 mm (0.039–0.083 in) wide on a petiole 0.1–0.4 mm (0.0039–0.0157 in) long with reddish-brown, broadly triangular stipules 0.5–0.9 mm (0.020–0.035 in) long at the base. The flowers are arranged singly in leaf axils, but sometimes appear clustered on the ends of branches with egg-shaped bracts 1.0–1.5 mm (0.039–0.059 in) long at the base. Male flowers are on a pedicel 0.5–1.3 mm (0.020–0.051 in) long, the 6 tepals narrowly oblong to oblong and whitish, 1.3–3.4 mm (0.051–0.134 in) long and 0.5–0.8 mm (0.020–0.031 in) wide and there are 6 stamens. Female flowers are sessile, the 5 or 6 tepals reddish-brown and creamy white, 1.1–2.2 mm (0.043–0.087 in) long and 0.2–0.6 mm (0.0079–0.0236 in) wide. Flowering has been observed from February to November, and the fruit is a green, oval capsule 3.5–4.0 mm (0.14–0.16 in) long.

== Taxonomy and naming ==
Pseudanthus ovalifolius was first formally described in 1857 by Ferdinand von Mueller in Transactions of the Philosophical Institute of Victoria. The specific epithet (ovalifolius) means "oval-leaved".

== Distribution and habitat ==
This species of shrub grows on rocky hillsides in heath, shrubland and mallee in scattered locations from near Eden in New South Wales, in the Grampians, near Bendigo and Ballarat in Victoria, and on Cape Barren and Flinders Islands in Tasmania.

== Conservation status ==
Pseudanthus ovalifolius is listed as "vulnerable" under the Victorian Government Flora and Fauna Guarantee Act 1988 and as "endangered" under the New South Wales Government Biodiversity Conservation Act 2016. The main threats to the species include land clearing, grazing by domestic stock and feral goats, and inappropriate fire regimes.
