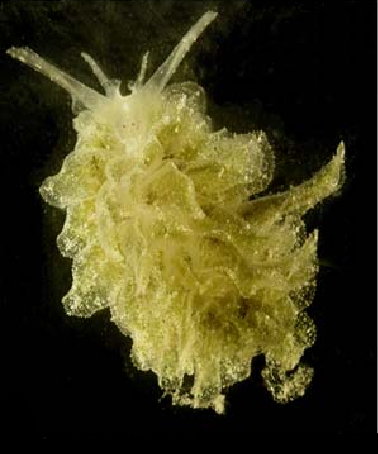
- A live individual of Polybranchia orientalis about 2 cm in length, head end towards the top of the image

Scientific classification
- Kingdom: Animalia
- Phylum: Mollusca
- Class: Gastropoda
- Superorder: Sacoglossa
- Family: Hermaeidae
- Genus: Polybranchia
- Species: P. orientalis

Binomial name
- Polybranchia orientalis (Kelaart, 1858)

Synonyms
- Proctonotus orientalis Kelaart, 1858

= Polybranchia orientalis =

Species of gastropod

Polybranchia orientalis commonly known as the bushy slug is a species of sacoglossan sea slug, a shell-less marine opisthobranch gastropod mollusk in the family Caliphyllidae. It was previously known as Phyllobranchillus orientalis..

== Distribution/Environment ==
This species occurs in the Indian Ocean and the Pacific Ocean. They are nocturnal animals which can be found under rocks and also found in tide pools. They are found in depths that range from 0 to 30 meters. Additionally, they prefer sea surface temperatures which range from 20 to 30 degrees Celsius, however there have been a few observations (less than 10), where they were found in sea surface temperatures that ranged from 5 to 10 degrees Celsius. Those 3 observations were made in Canada, Prince Edward Island.

== Description/Anatomy ==
This species is quite small, averaging a length of 4 to 5 centimeters. They have cerata which are organs used for digestion or respiration. For the bushy slug, the cerata contain fine branching digestive glands. As a defense mechanism, they easily drop their cerata when touched by others, including humans, and can stick to the human hand. Upon the loss of the cerata, they are able to grow back new cerata, however it takes a few days. The bushy slug also has an internal shell and rhinophores. The rhinophores are a pair of tentacles that are branched and typically hidden by the cerata. Additionally, there is a radula present which contains a single row of teeth. These radular teeth are pointed and specialized in piercing the algae which they feed on. Lastly, they also have two large papillae on the dorso-medial surface of each cera, with more papillae also located on both the dorsal and ventral surfaces of the cerata. However, these papillae are translucent.

== Diet/Feeding ==
This species feeds on algae which includes many different types of seaweed. Specifically, species that fall within the Sacoglossa order are strictly herbivores. One species of green seaweed that the bushy slug has been found nestled in clumps of, feeding off of, is Caulerpa racemosa.

== Reproduction ==
Members of the order Sacoglossa are simultaneous hermaphrodites. This means that they have both male and female reproductive organs at the same time. Additionally, fertilization occurs internally.

== Relevance to Humans ==
They do not pose a threat to humans.

== Additional Facts ==
Often, this species is not noticed due to its ability to camouflage itself. It is believed that they change color based on the color of seaweed they eat. Additionally, if they haven’t eaten, they are believed to be transparent.
