= Mourgona =

Scientific classification
- Kingdom: Animalia
- Phylum: Mollusca
- Class: Gastropoda
- Superorder: Sacoglossa
- Superfamily: Plakobranchoidea
- Family: Hermaeidae
- Genus: Mourgona; Er. Marcus & Ev. Marcus, 1970

Type species
- Mourgona murca Er. Marcus & Ev. Marcus, 1970

Synonyms
- Jenseneria Ortea & Moro, 2015

Genus of sea slugs

Mourgona is a genus of gastropods belonging to the family Hermaeidae.

The species of this genus are found in Central America, Malesia.

Species:

- Mourgona anisti Yonow & Jensen, 2018
- Mourgona borgninii (Trinchese, 1896)
- Mourgona germaineae Marcus & Marcus, 1970
- Mourgona murca Marcus & Marcus, 1970
- Mourgona osumi Hamatani, 1994
