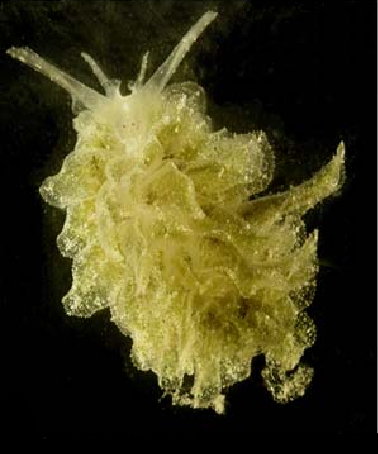
- A live individual of Polybranchia orientalis, head end towards the top of the image

Scientific classification
- Kingdom: Animalia
- Phylum: Mollusca
- Class: Gastropoda
- Family: Hermaeidae
- Genus: Polybranchia; Pease, 1860

Synonyms
- Branchophyllum Pruvot-Fol, 1947; Lobifera Pease, 1866 (Unnecessary substitute name for Polybranchia Pease, 1860); Phyllobranchillus Pruvot-Fol, 1933; Phyllobranchus Alder & Hancock, 1864 (Invalid: junior homonym of Phyllobranchus Girard, 1851 [Annelida]; Phyllobranchillus and Branchophyllum are replacement names)

= Polybranchia (gastropod) =

Genus of gastropods

Polybranchia is a genus of sacoglossan sea slugs, shell-less marine opisthobranch gastropod mollusks in the family Hermaeidae.

== Species ==
Species within the genus Polybranchia include:

- Polybranchia borgninii (Trinchese, 1896)
- Polybranchia orientalis (Kelaart, 1858)
- Polybranchia pallens (Burn, 1957)
- Polybranchia papillosa (Pease, 1866)
- Polybranchia pellucida Pease, 1860
- Polybranchia prasinus (Bergh, 1871)
- Polybranchia viridis (Deshayes, 1857)
- Polybranchia westralis Jensen, 1993
- Polybranchia sp. 1 from Kungkungan Bay, North Sulawesi, Indonesia
