= Notochord homeobox =

Transcription factor

NOTO

Identifiers
- Aliases: NOTO, notochord homeobox
- External IDs: MGI: 3053002; GeneCards: NOTO

Gene location (Human)
Chr.	Chromosome 2 (human)
Band	2p13.2	Start	73,202,574 bp
Band	2p13.2	End	73,212,513 bp

Gene location (Mouse)
Chr.	Chromosome 6 (mouse)
Band	6 C3|6 37.44 cM	Start	85,400,868 bp
Band	6 C3|6 37.44 cM	End	85,405,859 bp
RNA expression pattern
Bgee	Human / Mouse (ortholog); Top expressed in: duodenum; mucosa of transverse colon; C1 segment; prostate / Top expressed in: primary oocyte; secondary oocyte; notochord; zygote; embryonic organizer; hypoblast; morula; embryo; mesoderm; tail of embryo; More reference expression data
BioGPS	n/a
Gene ontology
Molecular function	DNA binding; DNA-binding transcription factor activity, RNA polymerase II-specific
Cellular component	nucleus
Biological process	regulation of cilium assembly; heart looping; multicellular organism development; notochord development; determination of left/right symmetry; regulation of transcription, DNA-templated; dorsal/ventral pattern formation; embryonic pattern specification; transcription, DNA-templated; motile cilium assembly; regulation of transcription by RNA polymerase II
Sources:Amigo / QuickGO
Orthologs
Databases	NCBI: entry; OMA: entry
Species	Human	Mouse
Entrez	344022	384452
Ensembl	ENSG00000214513	ENSMUSG00000068302
UniProt	A8MTQ0	Q5TIS6
RefSeq (mRNA)	NM_001134462	NM_001007472
RefSeq (protein)	NP_001127934	NP_001007473
Location (UCSC)	Chr 2: 73.2 – 73.21 Mb	Chr 6: 85.4 – 85.41 Mb
PubMed search
- Wikidata
View/Edit Human	View/Edit Mouse

Homeobox protein notochord (NOTO) is a transcription factor encoded by the gene notochord homeobox (NOTO) located on the short arm of chromosome 2 (2p13.2) in humans (Homo sapiens). An ortholog of NOTO is found in the house mouse (Mus musculus), among other species, as the gene notochord homeobox (Noto) located on chromosome 6, which encodes the homologous transcription factor homeobox protein notochord (Noto).

In the house mouse, Noto is expressed in cells comprising the primitive node (node) of the developing embryo and functions to define the shape of the primitive node, help develop the lateral (left-right) asymmetry of the embryo, and form cilia primarily on posterior nodal cells. Noto is also essential for the proper development of the caudal notochord. Noto acts downstream of the genes Foxa2 and T, and its expression is absent in embryos with mutant forms of Foxa2 and T. However, a direct relationship for the regulation of Noto expression by Foxa2 and T has not yet been confirmed. In contrast, Noto acts upstream of Foxj1 and Rfx3, which both function in the ciliogenesis of certain other mouse tissues.

Mouse embryos with mutant forms of Noto have been characterized by shortened nodal cilia, basal bodies deeply embedded in the cell cytoplasm, and/or an abnormally-developed caudal notochord (complete absence in some cases). In one experiment, replacing Noto with Foxj1 resulted in functional nodal cilia, but only with Noto expression were cilia localized on posterior nodal cells and the normal shape of the node established. Additionally, Noto mutant embryos are subject to randomization of lateral asymmetry and are therefore often characterized by isomerization of the lungs, malformation of the cardiac outflow tract, heterotaxia, and/or situs inversus.
