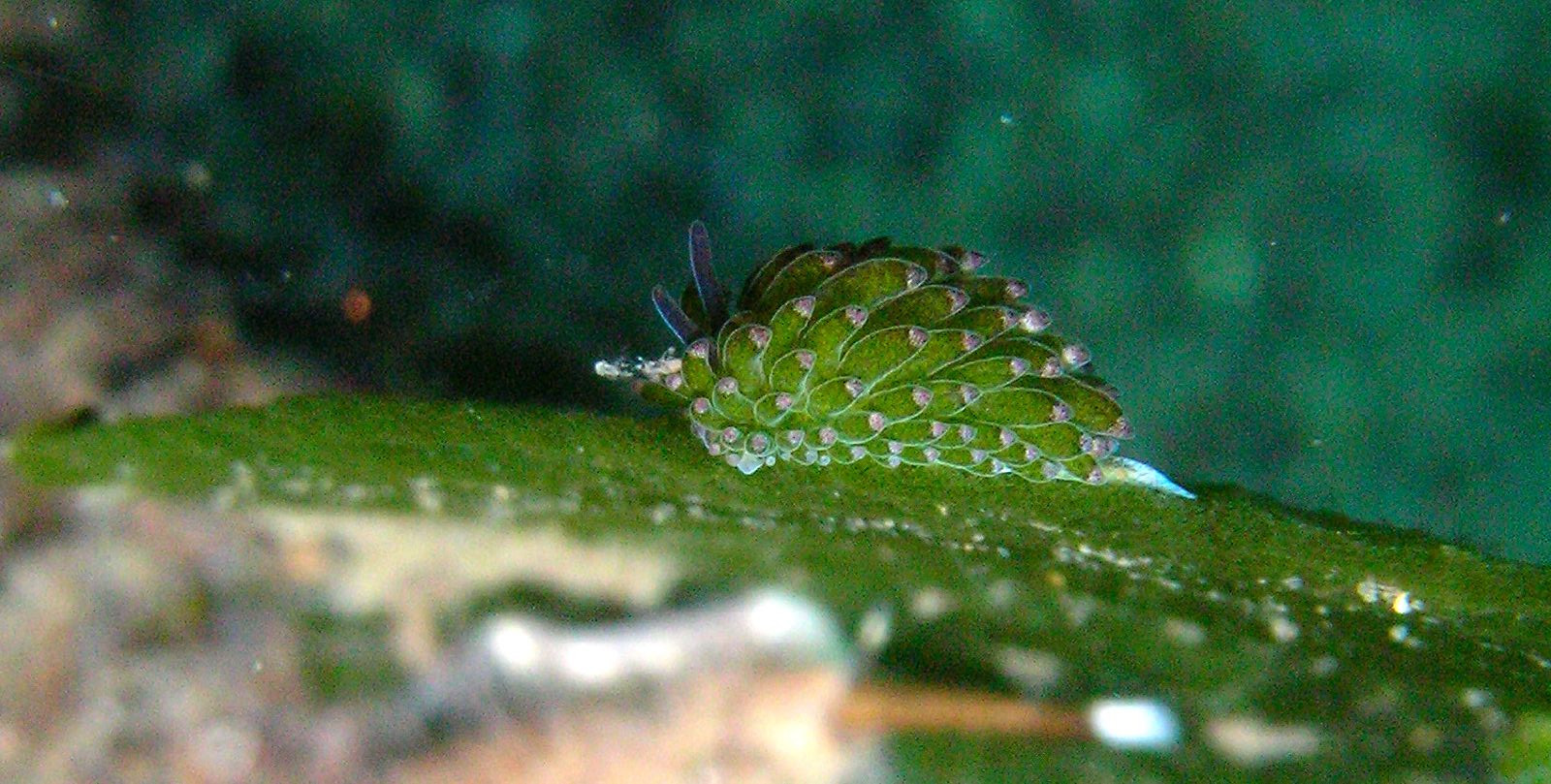
- A live individual in situ, head end towards the left
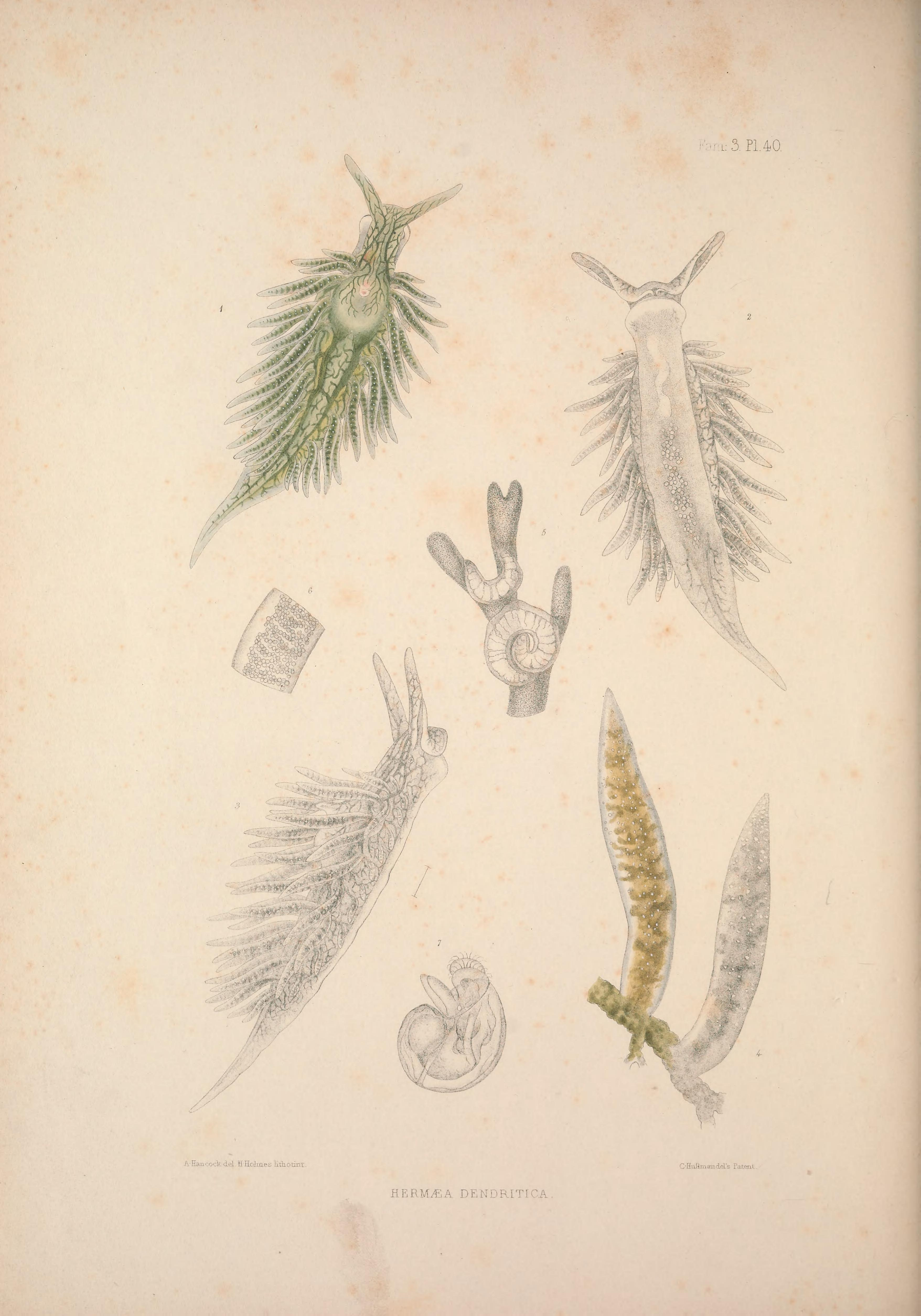
- illustration in A monograph of the British nudibranchiate Mollusca

Scientific classification
- Kingdom: Animalia
- Phylum: Mollusca
- Class: Gastropoda
- Superorder: Sacoglossa
- Family: Limapontiidae
- Genus: Placida
- Species: P. dendritica

Binomial name
- Placida dendritica (Alder, J. & A. Hancock, 1843)

Synonyms
- Hermaea dendritica Alder & Hancock, 1843

= Placida dendritica =

Species of gastropod

Placida dendritica is a species of small sea slug, a marine opisthobranch gastropod mollusk or micromollusk in the family Limapontiidae.

Despite a superficial resemblance, this is not a nudibranch, it is a sacoglossan (i.e. it is in the order Sacoglossa).

Like most sacoglossans, Placida dendritica feeds on coenocytic green algae. It is able to retain the chloroplasts for a short period.

== Distribution ==
This species has been reported worldwide, but it is most likely a species complex.
