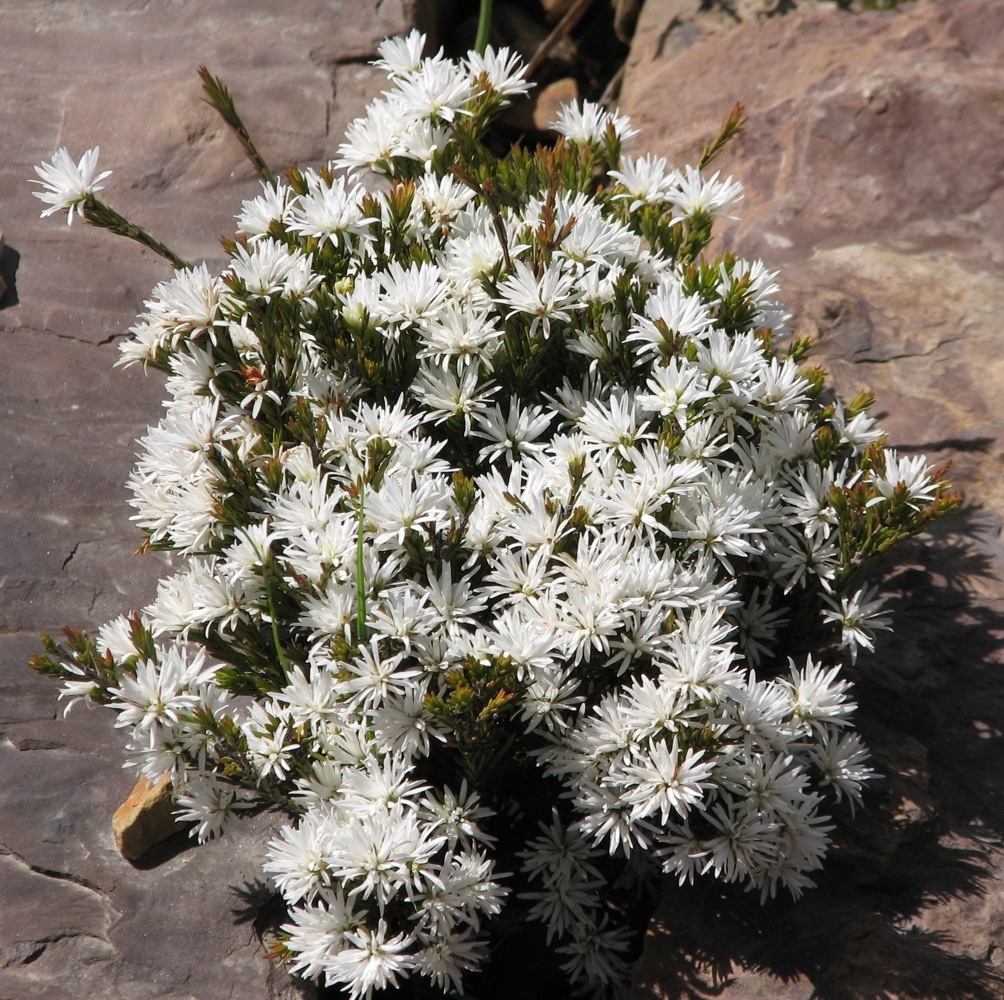
- Pseudanthus pimeleoides

Scientific classification
- Kingdom: Plantae
- Clade: Tracheophytes
- Clade: Angiosperms
- Clade: Eudicots
- Clade: Rosids
- Order: Malpighiales
- Family: Picrodendraceae
- Tribe: Caletieae
- Subtribe: Pseudanthinae
- Genus: Pseudanthus; Spreng.

Synonyms
- Caletia Baill. p.p.; Caletia sect. Microcaletia Müll.Arg.; Pseudanthus sect. Eupseudanthus Müll.Arg. nom. inval.; Pseudanthus sect. Microcaletia (Müll.Arg.) Kuntze; Pseudanthus Spreng. sect. Pseudanthus

= Pseudanthus =

Genus of flowering plants

Pseudanthus is a genus of nine species of flowering plants in the family Picrodendraceae, and is endemic to Australia. Plants in the genus Pseudanthus are small, heath-like, monoecious shrubs with simple, leathery leaves, and flowers arranged in upper leaf axils.

== Description ==
Plants in the genus Micrantheum are heath-like, monoecious shrubs with simple, leathery leaves with thickened edges. The leaves are on a short petiole with tiny stipules at the base. The flowers are arranged in upper leaf axils with bracts at the base. Male flowers are arranged in clusters on a short peduncle, and have six stamens. Female flowers are arranged singly and have an ovary with two or three cells with two ovules per cell, and two or three styles. The fruit is a capsule containing seeds with a caruncle.

== Taxonomy ==
The genus Pseudanthus was first formally described in 1827 by Kurt Polycarp Joachim Sprengel in Systema Vegetabilium, and the first species he described (the type species) was Pseudanthus pimeleoides.

=== Species list ===
The following is a list of species of Pseudanthus, accepted by the Australian Plant Census as of September 2023:

- Pseudanthus ballingalliae Halford & R.J.F.Hend. (Qld.)
- Pseudanthus divaricatissimus (Mull.Arg.) Benth. (N.S.W.)
- Pseudanthus ligulatus Halford & R.J.F.Hend. (Qld.)
- Pseudanthus micranthus Benth. - fringed pseudanthus (S.A.)
- Pseudanthus orbicularis (Müll.Arg.) Halford & R.J.F.Hend. (N.S.W., Vic.)
- Pseudanthus orientalis F.Muell. (Qld., N.S.W.)
- Pseudanthus ovalifolius F.Muell. - oval-leaf pseudanthus (Vic., N.S.W.)
- Pseudanthus pauciflorus Halford & R.J.F.Hend. (Qld., N.S.W.)
- Pseudanthus pimeleoides Sieber ex Spreng. (N.S.W.)

== See also ==
- Taxonomy of the Picrodendraceae
