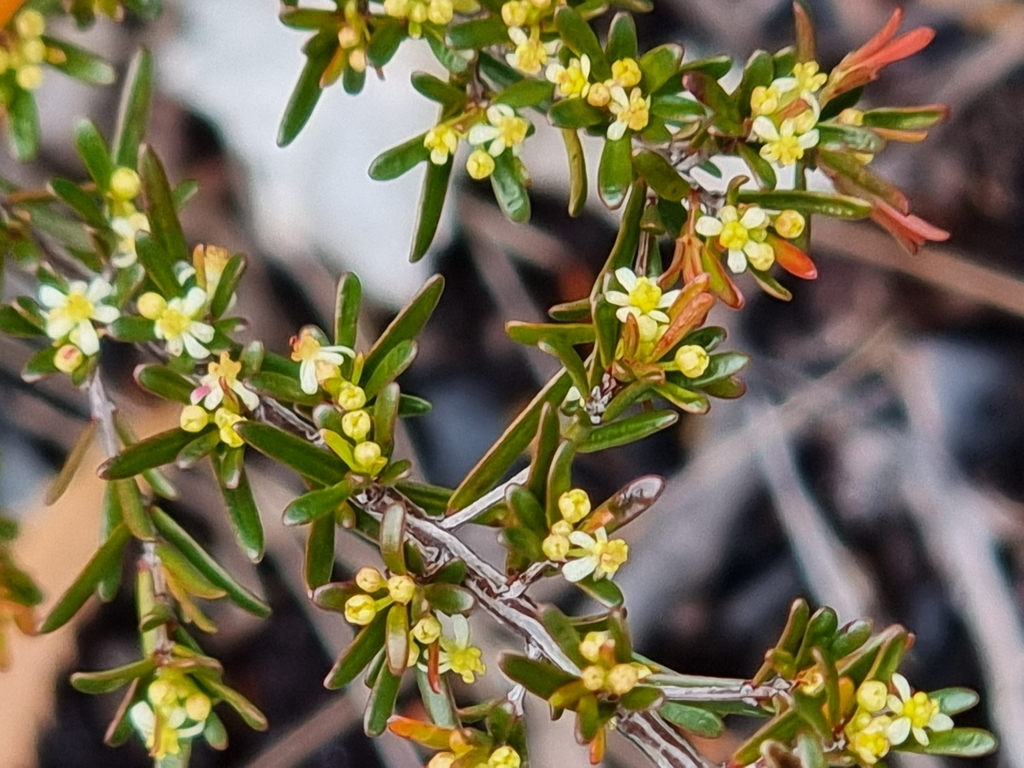
- In Great Sandy National Park

Scientific classification
- Kingdom: Plantae
- Clade: Tracheophytes
- Clade: Angiosperms
- Clade: Eudicots
- Clade: Rosids
- Order: Malpighiales
- Family: Picrodendraceae
- Genus: Pseudanthus
- Species: P. orientalis

Binomial name
- Pseudanthus orientalis F.Muell.

= Pseudanthus orientalis =

Species of shrub

Pseudanthus orientalis is a species of flowering plant in the family Picrodendraceae and is endemic to the coast of eastern Australia. It is a compact, rigid, monoecious shrub with simple, linear to narrowly oblong leaves and yellow to creamy-white flowers arranged singly in upper leaf axils, but often appearing clustered on the ends of branches.

== Description ==
Pseudanthus orientalis is a compact, rigid, glabrous monoecious shrub that typically grows to a height of 50 cm (20 in) with low lying stems up to 30 cm (12 in) long. Its leaves are linear to narrowly oblong, 3.5–13 mm (0.14–0.51 in) long and 0.7–1.7 mm (0.028–0.067 in) wide on a petiole 0.4–0.6 mm (0.016–0.024 in) long with pale reddish-brown, broadly triangular stipules 0.5–0.7 mm (0.020–0.028 in) long at the base. The flowers are arranged singly in leaf axils, but often appear clustered on the ends of branches with narrowly triangular bracts 0.6–1 mm (0.024–0.039 in) long at the base. Male flowers are on a pedicel 1–2 mm (0.039–0.079 in) long, the 6 tepals usually narrowly oblong and pale yellow to creamy-white, 0.9–1.6 mm (0.035–0.063 in) long and 0.4–0.8 mm (0.016–0.031 in) wide and there are usually 6 stamens. Female flowers are sessile, the 6 tepals pale green with reddish tips, 1.0–1.4 mm (0.039–0.055 in) long and 0.6–0.7 mm (0.024–0.028 in) wide. Flowering has been observed in most months with a peak from August to November, and the fruit is a narrowly oval, glossy brown capsule 3.5–4.0 mm (0.14–0.16 in) long.

== Taxonomy and naming ==
Pseudanthus orientalis was first formally described in 1860 by Ferdinand von Mueller in Fragmenta Phytographiae Australiae. The specific epithet (orientalis) means "pertaining to the east".

== Distribution and habitat ==
This species of shrub grows on coastal dunes and coastal heath from Shoalwater Bay on the coast of Queensland to Botany Bay in New South Wales.
