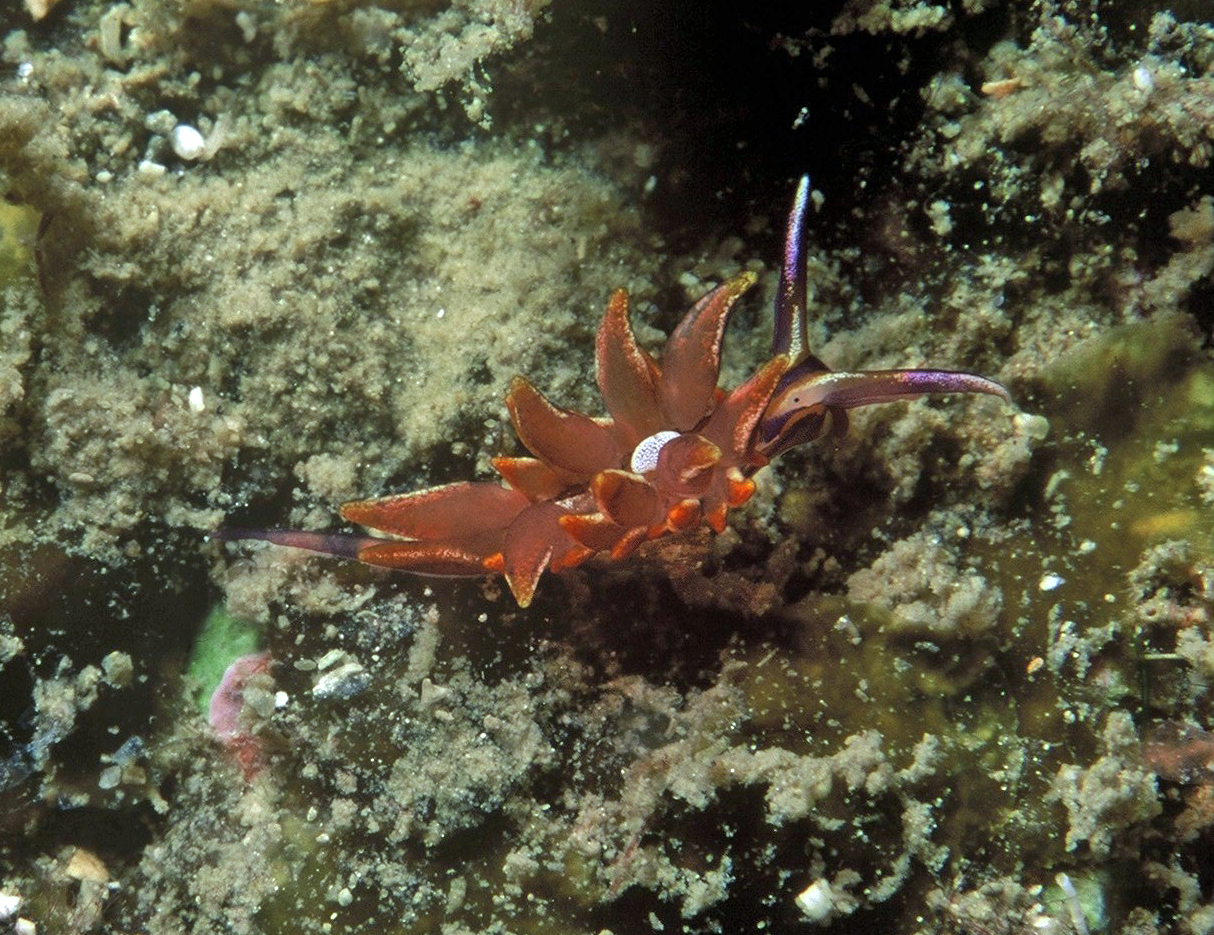
- Hermaea variopicta
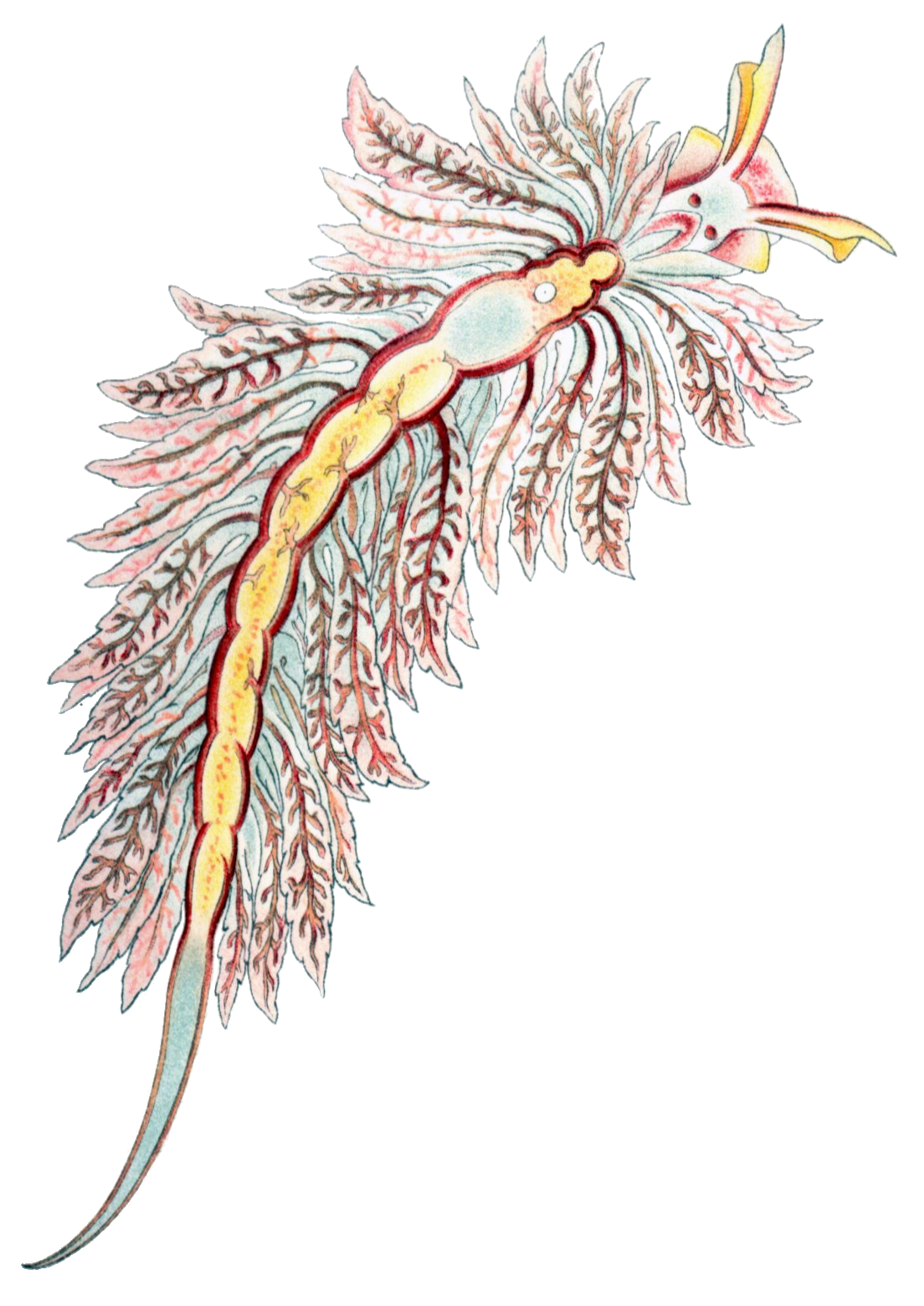
- Drawing of Hermaea bifida from Kunstformen der Natur (1904)

Scientific classification
- Kingdom: Animalia
- Phylum: Mollusca
- Class: Gastropoda
- Subterclass: Tectipleura
- Superorder: Sacoglossa
- Superfamily: Plakobranchoidea
- Family: Hermaeidae; H. Adams & A. Adams, 1854

Type genus
- Hermaea Lovén, 1844

Genera
- See text

Synonyms
- Caliphyllidae Tiberi, 1881; Jenseneriidae Ortea & Moro, 2015; Lobiferidae Pruvot-Fol, 1947; Phyllobranchidae Bergh, 1871 ( invalid family name: type * a junior homonym of Phyllobranchus Girard, 1851); Phyllobranchillidae Risbec, 1953; Polybranchiidae O'Donoghue, 1929

= Hermaeidae =

Family of gastropods

Hermaeidae is a taxonomic family of sacoglossan sea slugs. These are marine opisthobranch gastropod mollusks in the superfamily Plakobranchoidea.

This family has no subfamilies.

== Genera ==
Jensen (1996) listed three genera Aplysiopsis, Hermaea and Hermaeopsis A. Costa, 1869, which has been synonymized with * Hermaea.

Jensen (2007) listed two valid genera in the family Hermaeidae:

- Aplysiopsis Deshayes, 1839–53
- Caliphylla A. Costa, 1867
- Cyerce Bergh, 1870
- Hermaea Lovèn, 1844 - type *
- Mourgona Er. Marcus & Ev. Marcus, 1970
- Polybranchia Pease, 1860
- Sohgenia Hamatani, 1991

Genera brought into synonymy

- Beccaria Trinchese, 1870: synonym of Caliphylla A. Costa, 1867
- Branchophyllum Pruvot-Fol, 1947: synonym of Polybranchia Pease, 1860 (invalid: junior objective synonym of Phyllobranchillus, an earlier replacement name by the same author for the same homonym.)
- Hermaeina Trinchese, 1874: synonym of Aplysiopsis Deshayes, 1853
- Hermaeopsis A. Costa, 1869: synonym of Hermaea Lovén, 1844
- Jenseneria Ortea & Moro, 2015: synonym of Mourgona Er. Marcus & Ev. Marcus, 1970
- Lobiancoia Trinchese, 1881: synonym of Cyerce Bergh, 1870
- Lobifera Pease, 1866: synonym of Polybranchia Pease, 1860 (Unnecessary substitute name for Polybranchia Pease, 1860)
- Phyllobranchillus Pruvot-Fol, 1933: synonym of Polybranchia Pease, 1860
- Phyllobranchopsis Eliot, 1905: synonym of Aplysiopsis Bergh, 1898: synonym of Aplysia Linnaeus, 1767
- Phyllobranchus Alder & Hancock, 1864: synonym of Polybranchia Pease, 1860 (Invalid: junior homonym of Phyllobranchus Girard, 1851 [Annelida]; Phyllobranchillus and Branchophyllum are replacement names)
- Physopneumon A. Costa, 1864: synonym of Hermaea Lovén, 1844
- Polybranchea: synonym of Polybranchia Pease, 1860
- Polybranchus: synonym of Polybranchia Pease, 1860

Other invalid species within family Hermaeidae include:

- Physopneumon carneum A. Costa, 1862
