= Evolution of photosynthesis =

The evolution of photosynthesis refers to the origin and subsequent evolution of photosynthesis, the process by which light energy is used to assemble sugars from carbon dioxide and a hydrogen and electron source such as water. It is believed that the pigments used for photosynthesis initially were used for protection from the harmful effects of light, particularly ultraviolet light. The process of photosynthesis was discovered by Jan Ingenhousz, a Dutch-born British physician and scientist, first publishing about it in 1779.

The first photosynthetic organisms probably evolved early in the evolutionary history of life and most likely used reducing agents such as hydrogen rather than water. There are three major metabolic pathways by which photosynthesis is carried out: C_{3} photosynthesis, C_{4} photosynthesis, and CAM photosynthesis. C_{3} photosynthesis is the oldest and most common form. A C_{3} plant uses the Calvin cycle for the initial steps that incorporate CO_{2} into organic material. A C_{4} plant prefaces the Calvin cycle with reactions that incorporate CO_{2} into four-carbon compounds. A CAM plant uses crassulacean acid metabolism, an adaptation for photosynthesis in arid conditions. C_{4} and CAM plants have special adaptations that save water.

== Origin ==
Life timeline
← / Earth formed; ← / Earliest water; ← / LUCA; ← / Earliest fossils; ← / Great Oxygenation Event; ← / Sexual reproduction; ← / Earliest fungi; ← / Neoproterozoic oxygenation event; ← / Ediacaran biota; ← / Cambrian explosion; ← / Earliest tetrapods; ← / Earliest hominoid
(million years ago)

Available evidence from geobiological studies of sedimentary rocks from the Archean eon, more than 2.5Gy ago, suggests that life existed at 3.5Gy. Fossils of what are thought to be filamentous photosynthetic organisms have been dated at 3.4Gy, consistent with recent studies of photosynthesis. Early photosynthetic systems, such as those from green and purple sulfur and green and purple nonsulfur bacteria, are thought to have been anoxygenic, using various molecules as electron donors. Green and purple sulfur bacteria are thought to have used hydrogen and hydrogen sulfide as electron and hydrogen donors. Green nonsulfur bacteria used various amino and other organic acids. Purple nonsulfur bacteria used a variety of nonspecific organic and inorganic molecules. It is suggested that photosynthesis likely originated at low-wavelength geothermal light from acidic hydrothermal vents, that Zn-tetrapyrroles were the first photochemically active pigments, and that the photosynthetic organisms were anaerobic and relied on H_{2}S without relying on H_{2} emitted by alkaline hydrothermal vents. The divergence of anoxygenic photosynthetic organisms at the photic zone could have led to the ability to strip electrons from H_{2}S more efficiently under ultraviolet radiation. There is geochemical evidence that suggests that anaerobic photosynthesis emerged 3.3 to 3.5 billion years ago. The organisms later developed a Chlorophyll F synthase. They could have also stripped electrons from soluble metal ions, although it is unknown.

The first oxygenic photosynthetic organisms are proposed to be H_{2}S-dependent. It is also suggested photosynthesis originated under sunlight, using H_{2}S emitted by volcanoes and hydrothermal vents which ended the need for scarce H_{2} emitted by alkaline hydrothermal vents. Oxygenic photosynthesis uses water as an electron donor, which is oxidized to molecular oxygen (O_{2}) in the photosynthetic reaction center. The biochemical capacity for oxygenic photosynthesis evolved in a common ancestor of extant cyanobacteria. The first appearance of free oxygen in the atmosphere is sometimes referred to as the oxygen catastrophe. The geological record indicates that this transforming event took place during the Paleoproterozoic era at least 2450–2320 million years ago (Ma), and, it is speculated, much earlier. A clear paleontological window on cyanobacterial evolution opened about 2000 Ma, revealing an already-diverse biota of blue-greens. Cyanobacteria remained principal primary producers throughout the Proterozoic Eon (2500–543 Ma), in part because the redox structure of the oceans favored photoautotrophs capable of nitrogen fixation. Green algae joined blue-greens as major primary producers on continental shelves near the end of the Proterozoic; but only with the Mesozoic (251–65 Ma) radiations of dinoflagellates, coccolithophorids, and diatoms did primary production in marine shelf waters take modern form. Cyanobacteria remain critical to marine ecosystems as primary producers in oceanic gyres, as agents of biological nitrogen fixation, and, in modified form, as the plastids of marine algae. Modern photosynthesis in plants and most photosynthetic prokaryotes is oxygenic.

=== Timeline of photosynthesis on Earth ===
4.6 billion years ago	Earth forms
3.4 billion years ago	First photosynthetic bacteria appear
2.7 billion years ago	Cyanobacteria become the first oxygen producers
2.4 – 2.3 billion years ago	Earliest evidence (from rocks) that oxygen was in the atmosphere
1.2 billion years ago	Red and brown algae become structurally more complex than bacteria
0.75 billion years ago	Green algae outperform red and brown algae in the strong light of shallow water
0.475 billion years ago	First land plants – mosses and liverworts
0.423 billion years ago	Vascular plants evolve

== Symbiosis and the origin of chloroplasts ==
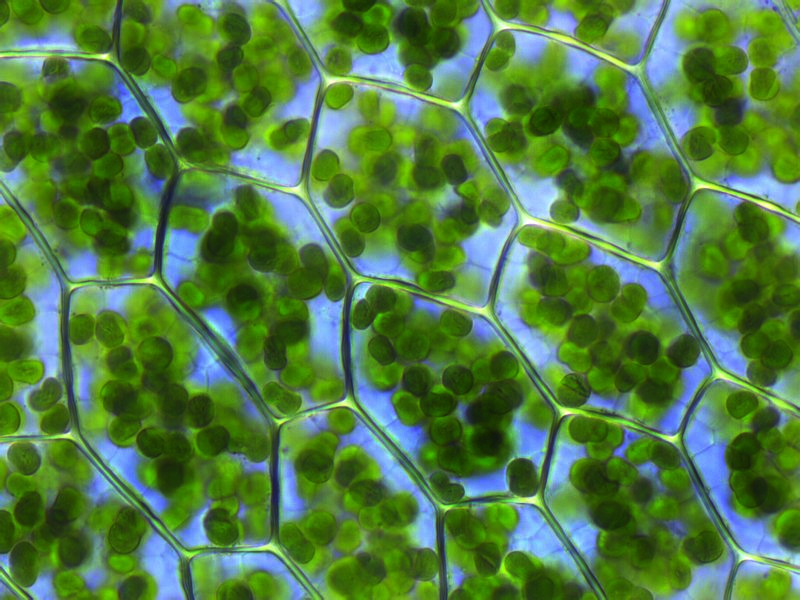
Plant cells with visible chloroplasts (from a moss, Plagiomnium affine)

Several groups of animals have formed symbiotic relationships with photosynthetic algae. These are most common in corals, sponges and sea anemones. It is presumed that this is due to the particularly simple body plans and large surface areas of these animals compared to their volumes. In addition, a few marine mollusks Elysia viridis and Elysia chlorotica also maintain a symbiotic relationship with chloroplasts they capture from the algae in their diet and then store in their bodies. This allows the mollusks to survive solely by photosynthesis for several months at a time. Some of the genes from the plant cell nucleus have even been transferred to the slugs, so that the chloroplasts can be supplied with proteins that they need to survive.

An even closer form of symbiosis may explain the origin of chloroplasts. Chloroplasts have many similarities with photosynthetic bacteria, including a circular chromosome, prokaryotic-type ribosomes, and similar proteins in the photosynthetic reaction center. The endosymbiotic theory suggests that photosynthetic bacteria were acquired (by endocytosis) by early eukaryotic cells to form the first plant cells. Therefore, chloroplasts may be photosynthetic bacteria that adapted to life inside plant cells. Like mitochondria, chloroplasts still possess their own DNA, separate from the nuclear DNA of their plant host cells and the genes in this chloroplast DNA resemble those in cyanobacteria. DNA in chloroplasts codes for redox proteins such as photosynthetic reaction centers. The CoRR Hypothesis proposes that this Co-location is required for Redox Regulation.

== Evolution of photosynthetic pathways ==
The C_{4} carbon concentrating mechanism

In its simplest form, photosynthesis is adding water to CO_{2} to produce sugars and oxygen, but a complex chemical pathway is involved, facilitated along the way by a range of enzymes and co-enzymes. The enzyme RuBisCO is responsible for "fixing" CO_{2} – that is, it attaches it to a carbon-based molecule to form a sugar, which can be used by the plant, releasing an oxygen molecule along the way. However, the enzyme is notoriously inefficient, and just as effectively will also fix oxygen instead of CO_{2} in a process called photorespiration. This is energetically costly as the plant has to use energy to turn the products of photorespiration back into a form that can react with CO_{2}.

=== Concentrating carbon ===
The C_{4} metabolic pathway is a valuable recent evolutionary innovation in plants, involving a complex set of adaptive changes to physiology and gene expression patterns. About 7600 species of plants use C_{4} carbon fixation, which represents about 3% of all terrestrial species of plants. All these 7600 species are angiosperms.

C_{4} plants evolved carbon concentrating mechanisms. These work by increasing the concentration of CO_{2} around RuBisCO, thereby facilitating photosynthesis and decreasing photorespiration. The process of concentrating CO_{2} around RuBisCO requires more energy than allowing gases to diffuse, but under certain conditions – i.e. warm temperatures (>25 °C), low CO_{2} concentrations, or high oxygen concentrations – pays off in terms of the decreased loss of sugars through photorespiration.

One type of C_{4} metabolism employs a so-called Kranz anatomy. This transports CO_{2} through an outer mesophyll layer, via a range of organic molecules, to the central bundle sheath cells, where the CO_{2} is released. In this way, CO_{2} is concentrated near the site of RuBisCO operation. Because RuBisCO is operating in an environment with much more CO_{2} than it otherwise would be, it performs more efficiently. In C_{4} photosynthesis, carbon is fixed by an enzyme called PEP carboxylase, which, like all enzymes involved in C_{4} photosynthesis, originated from non-photosynthetic ancestral enzymes.

A second mechanism, CAM photosynthesis, is a carbon fixation pathway that evolved in some plants as an adaptation to arid conditions. The most important benefit of CAM to the plant is the ability to leave most leaf stomata closed during the day. This reduces water loss due to evapotranspiration. The stomata open at night to collect CO_{2}, which is stored as the four-carbon acid malate, and then used during photosynthesis during the day. The pre-collected CO_{2} is concentrated around the enzyme RuBisCO, increasing photosynthetic efficiency. More CO_{2} is then harvested from the atmosphere when stomata open, during the cool, moist nights, reducing water loss.

CAM has evolved convergently many times. It occurs in 16,000 species (about 7% of plants), belonging to over 300 genera and around 40 families, but this is thought to be a considerable underestimate. It is found in quillworts (relatives of club mosses), in ferns, and in gymnosperms, but the great majority of plants using CAM are angiosperms (flowering plants).

=== Evolutionary record ===
These two pathways, with the same effect on RuBisCO, evolved a number of times independently – indeed, C_{4} alone arose 62 times in 18 different plant families. A number of 'pre-adaptations' seem to have paved the way for C_{4}, leading to its clustering in certain clades: it has most frequently developed in plants that already had features such as extensive vascular bundle sheath tissue. Whole-genome and individual gene duplication are also associated with C_{4} evolution. Many potential evolutionary pathways resulting in the C_{4} phenotype are possible and have been characterised using Bayesian inference, confirming that non-photosynthetic adaptations often provide evolutionary stepping stones for the further evolution of C_{4}.

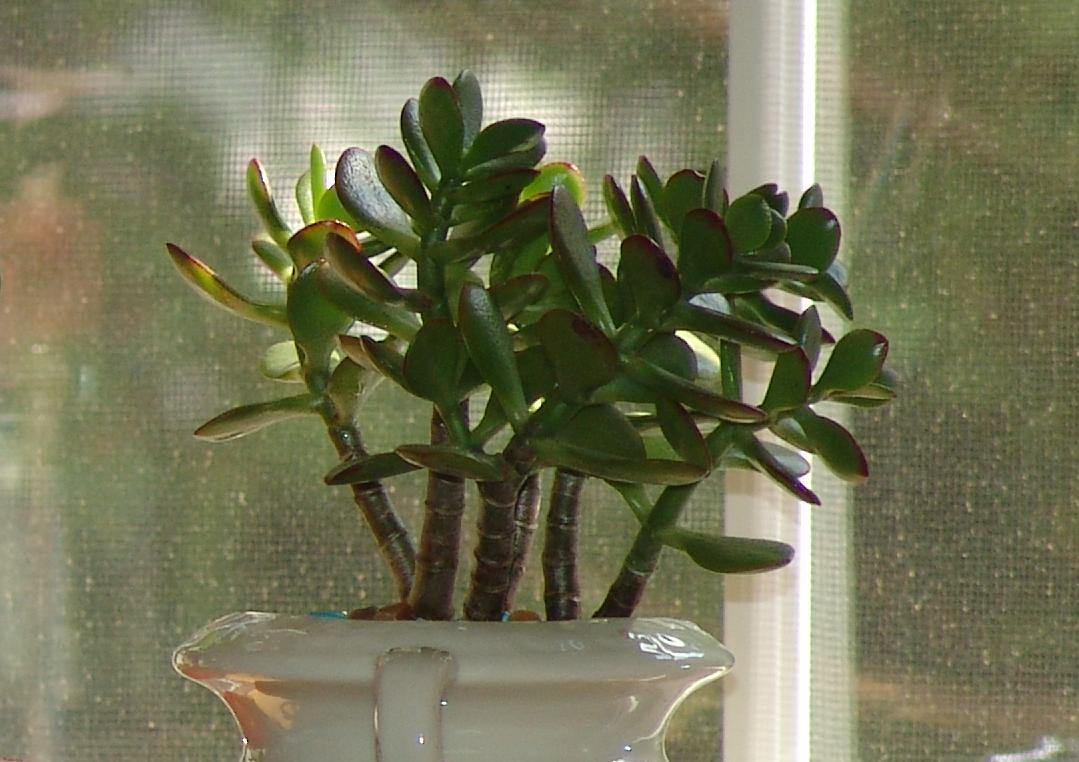
Crassulacean Acid Metabolism (CAM) is named after the family Crassulaceae, to which the jade plant belongs. Another example of a CAM plant is the pineapple.

The C_{4} construction is most famously used by a subset of grasses, while CAM is employed by many succulents and cacti. The trait appears to have emerged during the Oligocene, around 25 to 32 million years ago; however, they did not become ecologically significant until the Miocene, 6 to 7 million years ago. Remarkably, some charcoalified fossils preserve tissue organised into the Kranz anatomy, with intact bundle sheath cells, allowing the presence C_{4} metabolism to be identified without doubt at this time. Isotopic markers are used to deduce their distribution and significance.

C_{3} plants preferentially use the lighter of two isotopes of carbon in the atmosphere, ^{12}C, which is more readily involved in the chemical pathways involved in its fixation. Because C_{4} metabolism involves a further chemical step, this effect is accentuated. Plant material can be analysed to deduce the ratio of the heavier ^{13}C to ^{12}C. This ratio is denoted δ^{13}C. C_{3} plants are on average around 14‰ (parts per thousand) lighter than the atmospheric ratio, while C_{4} plants are about 28‰ lighter. The δ^{13}C of CAM plants depends on the percentage of carbon fixed at night relative to what is fixed in the day, being closer to C_{3} plants if they fix most carbon in the day and closer to C_{4} plants if they fix all their carbon at night.

It is troublesome procuring original fossil material in sufficient quantity to analyse the grass itself, but fortunately there is a good proxy: horses. Horses were globally widespread in the period of interest, and browsed almost exclusively on grasses. There's an old phrase in isotope palæontology, "you are what you eat (plus a little bit)" – this refers to the fact that organisms reflect the isotopic composition of whatever they eat, plus a small adjustment factor. There is a good record of horse teeth throughout the globe, and their δ^{13}C has been measured. The record shows a sharp negative inflection around 6 to 7 million years ago, during the Messinian, and this is interpreted as the rise of C_{4} plants on a global scale.

=== When is C_{4} an advantage? ===
While C_{4} enhances the efficiency of RuBisCO, the concentration of carbon is highly energy intensive. This means that C_{4} plants only have an advantage over C_{3} organisms in certain conditions: namely, high temperatures and low rainfall. C_{4} plants also need high levels of sunlight to thrive. Models suggest that, without wildfires removing shade-casting trees and shrubs, there would be no space for C_{4} plants. But, wildfires have occurred for 400 million years – why did C_{4} take so long to arise, and then appear independently so many times? The Carboniferous period (~300 million years ago) had notoriously high oxygen levels – almost enough to allow spontaneous combustion – and very low CO_{2}, but there is no C_{4} isotopic signature to be found. And there doesn't seem to be a sudden trigger for the Miocene rise.

During the Miocene, the atmosphere and climate were relatively stable. If anything, CO_{2} increased gradually from 14 to 9 million years ago before settling down to concentrations similar to the Holocene. This suggests that it did not have a key role in invoking C_{4} evolution. Grasses themselves (the group which would give rise to the most occurrences of C_{4}) had probably been around for 60 million years or more, so had had plenty of time to evolve C_{4}, which, in any case, is present in a diverse range of groups and thus evolved independently. There is a strong signal of climate change in South Asia; increasing aridity – hence increasing fire frequency and intensity – may have led to an increase in the importance of grasslands. However, this is difficult to reconcile with the North American record. It is possible that the signal is entirely biological, forced by the fire- and grazer- driven acceleration of grass evolution – which, both by increasing weathering and incorporating more carbon into sediments, reduced atmospheric CO_{2} levels. Finally, there is evidence that the onset of C_{4} from 9 to 7 million years ago is a biased signal, which only holds true for North America, from where most samples originate; emerging evidence suggests that grasslands evolved to a dominant state at least 15Ma earlier in South America.

== See also ==
- Photorespiration
- Evolution of plants
- Plastid evolution
