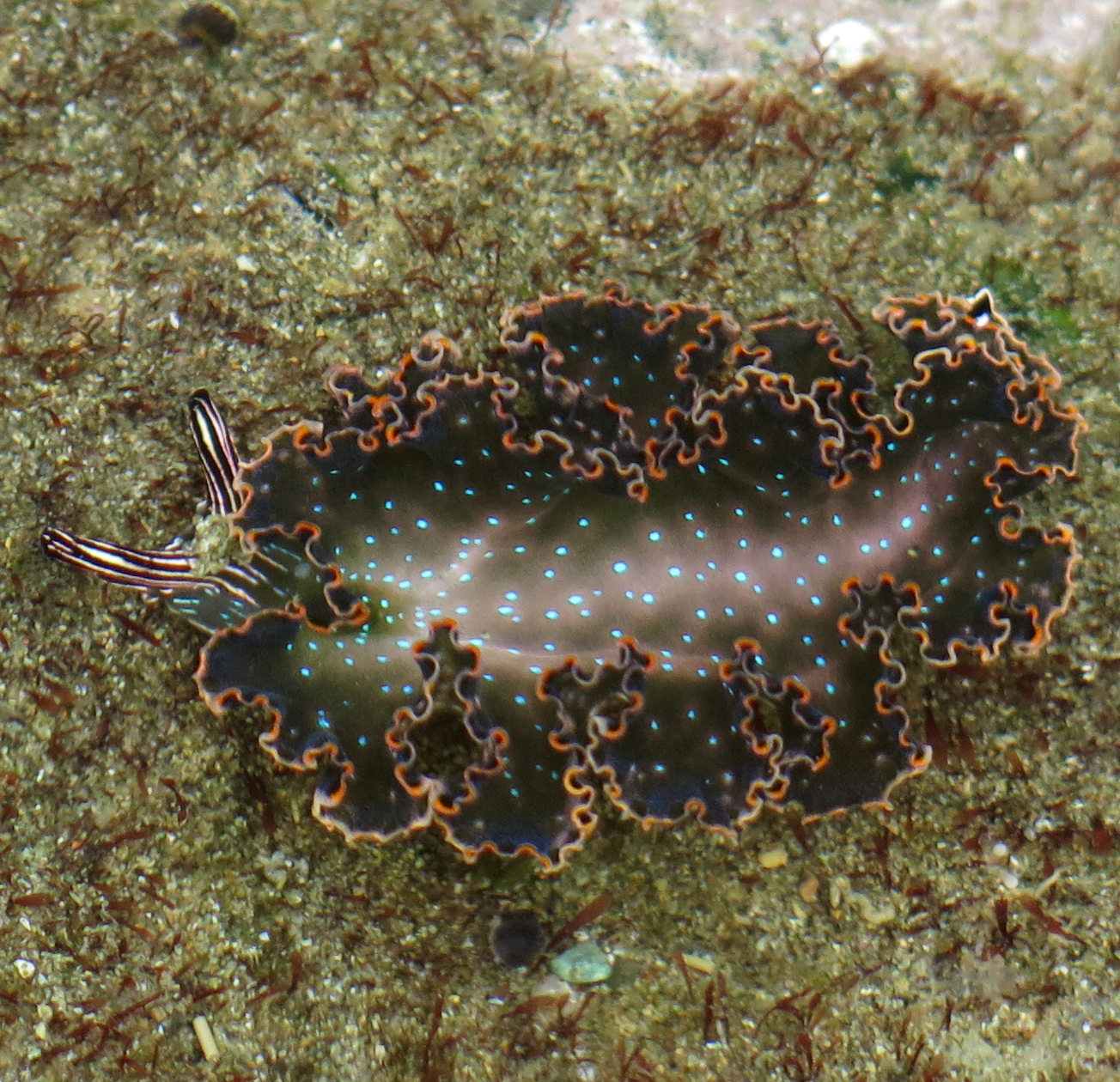

Scientific classification
- Kingdom: Animalia
- Phylum: Mollusca
- Class: Gastropoda
- Family: Plakobranchidae
- Genus: Elysia
- Species: E. diomedea

Binomial name
- Elysia diomedea (Bergh, 1894)

Synonyms
- Tridachia diomedea Bergh, 1894 (original combination); Tridachiella diomedea (Bergh, 1894)

= Elysia diomedea =

Species of gastropod

Elysia diomedea is a species of sea slug found throughout the Pacific coast of Central America.

This sea slug resembles a nudibranch but is not closely related to that order of gastropods, instead belonging to a closely related clade, Sacoglossa, the "sap-sucking" sea slugs.

== Description ==
Elysia diomedea grows to a length of about 50 millimetres (2.0 in). It is a pale green colour with longitudinal streaks of white. The parapodia are densely convoluted and edged with orange and black. They are not joined at the front and when they are spread apart, they reveal blue spots underneath. Parts of the gut ramify into the foot, causing green patches which are interspersed with translucent white streaks. The rhinophores have longitudinal stripes of yellow and black.

== Distribution ==
Elysia diomedea is found in the eastern Pacific Ocean off the coasts of Central America including the Gulf of Panama and the Gulf of California, where it is common. It lives at depths of up to 20 metres (66 ft).

== Biology ==
Elysia diomedea exhibits kleptoplasty in the same way as do the closely related Elysia clarki and Elysia crispata. When it feeds on algae, some of the chloroplasts that it has ingested remain in its tissues. It then makes use of the energy they produce as they continue to photosynthesize. To maximise this, the slug is often seen in sunlit shallow waters, spreading its parapodia.

Elysia diomedea deposits its eggs in an "egg ribbon" which forms a flat spiral. The eggs are very tiny, which suggests that they pass through a veliger larval stage as part of the zooplankton before settling on the seabed, undergoing metamorphosis and becoming juvenile crawling slugs.
