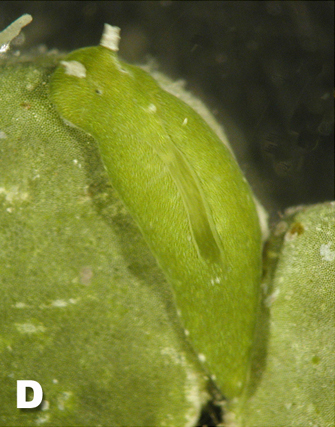

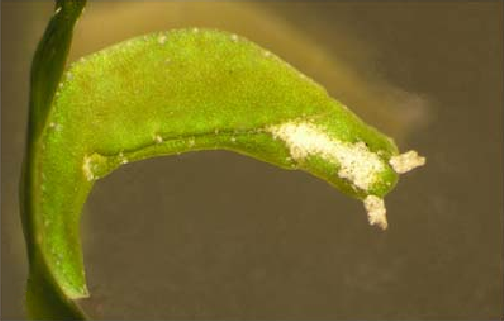
- Elysia pusilla about 1 cm in length

Scientific classification
- Kingdom: Animalia
- Phylum: Mollusca
- Class: Gastropoda
- Superorder: Sacoglossa
- Family: Plakobranchidae
- Genus: Elysia
- Species: E. pusilla

Binomial name
- Elysia pusilla (Bergh, 1872)

Synonyms
- Elysiella pusilla Bergh, 1872

= Elysia pusilla =

Species of gastropod

Elysia pusilla is a species of small sea slug, a marine gastropod mollusk in the family Plakobranchidae. It is a sacoglossan.

Elysia pusilla feeds on the calcified green alga Halimeda and incorporates functioning chloroplasts into its body, thus it is known as a solar-powered sea slug. It is found in shallow water in tropical regions of the Indo-Pacific wherever its host species grows.

Elysia pusilla are part of Sacoglossa, also known as the solar powered sea slugs and might be the most common Elysia species. Sacoglossans are marine gastropods that ingest the chloroplast of algae. Sacoglossa has two superfamilies under it: Plakobranchidae and Oxynoace. The distinguishing feature between the two superfamilies is having a shell or being able to store chloroplast. Oxynoacea consists of three shelled families, all of whom don't photosynthesize with the algae they consume. However, they might be able to retain the chloroplast and use it as camouflage. Elysia pusilla is under the superfamily Plakobranchidae. The majority of the organisms in this superfamily are shell less, however, many develop a shell before hatching. Sacoglossa are the only metazoans on earth to exhibit kleptoplasty. The only other organisms known to have this ability are single celled protists.

Elysia pusilla and Elysia stylifera are each other's closest living relative. They are often found together on a calcareous algae called Halimeda. The sea slugs use the chemicals to protect themselves and their eggs.

== Description ==
Elysia pusilla is a cryptic sea slug which grows to about 3 centimetres (1.2 in) long. Its colour and shape both match that of the alga on which it is feeding; on older foliage it is flattened and a mottled pale green, on fresh new growth it is a brighter shade of green and on the cylindrical shoots that sometimes develop, it adopts a more circular cross section.

Elysia pusilla are green in color and are typically 1-3 cm in length. They are a cryptic species whose morphology matches the algae they feed on. Elysia pusilla are found exclusively on calcareous green algae, called Halimeda taenicola. The shape or texture influences the shape of the nudibranch. When living on broader segments of Halimeda, Elysia tends to be more flattened, while cylindrical segments of Halimeda have more cylindrical-shaped Elysia.

This uniform green color is due to the ingested chloroplast that is stored in their tissue. They occasionally have white dots as well. Many of the Elysia species have parapodia, wing-like flaps, that are spread out and flattened to increase surface area and cephalic tentacles. Specifically in Elysia pusilla, the parapodia are partially fused. Because their parapodia are smaller than other species, some scientists place them in a separate genus. Located on top of its head are white, club-shaped sensory organs called rhinophores or cephalic tentacles. The rhinophores may be used to detect chemical stimuli which can act as an indicator to metamorphosize. As part of the mollusca phylum and under the class Gastropod, Elysia pusilla has a soft body, ventralized foot for moving, radula and long guts used for feeding, and a mantle used for protection. They are also bilaterally symmetrical, with three layers of tissues that allow them to form a body cavity, called a coelom, and have organs independent of the body wall.

Nudibranchs have no gills and breathe through their skin secondary gills using tentacle-looking things, called cerata, on their back. In many nudibranchs, the cerata is a blood-filled tube that acts as an extension of the digestive system and can be used for defense. In another nudibranch species, such as the aeolids, the cerata contain sacs called cnidosacs that store nematocysts, stinging cells from cnidarians which have been acquired from feeding.

== Distribution ==
Sacoglossa are found in temperate and tropical oceans, with most of them living in the Central Pacific. Specific species, such as Elysia pusilla are found in the tropical indo Pacific Ocean, with other species living in the Caribbean. They are found between the depths of 0.5 and 0.9 m.

== Ecology ==
=== Diet and feeding ===
As a member of the class gastropod, Elysia pusilla uses a radula, which is a ribbon of chitinous teeth to feed. In general, the radula is used to scrape algae and slice seaweeds. They have digestive enzymes secreted by the digestive and salivary glands to aid in digestion. Sea slugs extract the green algae by piercing the cell wall and storing the plastids in their digestive glands.

Many nudibranchs are stenophagous, meaning that they only feed on one to two organisms.

Specifically, Elysia pusilla feeds on a green calcareous algae called Halimeda, but can also use the chloroplast and genes from the algae to photosynthesize, thus producing its own energy.

=== Kleptoplasty ===
Elysia pusilla and other sea slugs in this superorder are able to take the plastids from the algae they eat and incorporate it into their living tissue in a process called kleptoplasty. This is a special form of parasitic endosymbiosis. The organism uses the chloroplast they eat and store it in their tissues. The chloroplast lines the digestive tract, which allows the organisms to survive for several months solely relying on kleptoplasty. Specifically, the algae is digested, but the plastids are still intact, allowing it to be incorporated into the host organism. The chloroplast from the algae the organisms feed on are kept alive for weeks to months. Many of the proteins in chloroplast are also encoded in the genome of the sea slugs. The proteins synthesized by the sea slugs are moved into the chloroplast, allowing it to survive for long periods in the host cells. Through kleptoplasty, the organisms are able to survive for months just relying on this process.

== Life cycle ==
=== Reproduction ===
The eggs are usually laid in a spiral formation. They usually hatch after 6 days.

The reproduction method poecilogony, an intraspecific reproduction method in which there are two different forms of larvae modes, is quite rare in the animal kingdom. The different egg sizes, or egg dimorphism, are able to produce two kinds of larvae: planktotrophic and lecithotrophic larvae. Lecithotroph, meaning "feeding on yolk" refers to the larvae relying on the yolk sac produced by the mother as they are not able to feed. Planktophic larvae are larvae that must feed on plankton in order to grow and develop. There are only thirteen cases of poecilogony reported in marine organisms, with seven in spionid polychaetes and six in gastropods- five sacoglossan gastropods and littorinimorph gastropod. Elysia pusilla may be the sixth organism in the order sacoglossans to be capable of this. In Elysia pusilla and Elysia zuleicae, the planktotrophic larvae are more common, but some still produce the lecithotrophic larvae. The smaller size of the lecithotrophic larvae in sacoglossans in comparison to other heterobranchs may allow for developmental plasticity in response to the environment. The frequency of the size difference among the eggs allows sacoglossans to get around the one mode reproductive methods.

==== Hermaphrodites ====
Fertilization in gastropods is mainly internal. Many are hermaphrodites, either simultaneous hermaphrodites, meaning they gave both female and male sex genitiles or sequential hermaphrodites, meaning they switch between female and male.

Mating between simultaneous hermaphrodites involves the two individuals lining up on the right side since their genitals are on the right side of their body, close to their head. During mating, both individuals are fertilized and involve the transfer of love darts which includes stabbing and hormonal manipulation. In some species, the hook of the love dart will break off.

=== Larval stage ===
As Protostomes, under Bilateria, this species' blastopore formed the mouth first, then the anus. The way the early cells cleaved is a spiral. The coelom is formed by the masses of mesoderms splitting.

=== Cleavage ===
The cleavage is spiral and holoblastic. This means that the upper tier of the animal's cells, called micromeres, are situated at a 45° angle to the lower tier of the macromeres. This means that the daughter blastomeres are at a 45° angle.

== Movement ==
Like other gastropods, Elysia pusilla uses their ventral foot to move. They use mucus to aid in gliding. Muscle contractions and expansions cause the mucus to spread out, allowing the animal to glide across the surface.

== See also ==
- Sacoglossa
- Elysia
- Kleptoplasty
- Cleavage
