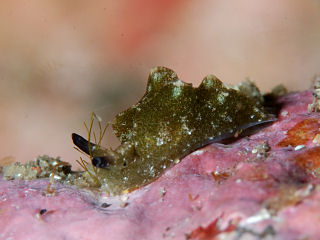

Scientific classification
- Kingdom: Animalia
- Phylum: Mollusca
- Class: Gastropoda
- Superorder: Sacoglossa
- Superfamily: Plakobranchoidea
- Family: Plakobranchidae
- Genus: Elysia
- Species: E. atroviridis

Binomial name
- Elysia atroviridis Baba, 1955

Synonyms
- Elysia setoensis Hamatani, 1968

= Elysia atroviridis =

Species of sea slug

Elysia atroviridis is a benthic species of sea slug belonging to the family Plakobranchidae native to the northwest pacific. E. atroviridis slugs live up to three meters deep, and are generally dark green in skin colour with small, black spots all around the body. E. atroviridis is a member of the superorder Sacoglossa, and thus possesses the ability to perform kleptoplasty. E. atroviridis and Elysia marginata are notable for possessing the ability to completely autotomize their bodies and grow them back within 20 days.

== Kleptoplasty ==
Being a member of the superorder Sacoglossa, E. atroviridis is capable of kleptoplasty, which is the process of taking chloroplasts from digested algae and using them for photosynthesis. Kleptoplasty is performed when the slug eats algae and partially digests it, but keeps the chloroplasts intact, incorporating them into their digestive tract's tissues, which allows the chloroplasts to stay alive and contribute energy to the host via photosynthesis.

== Autotomy ==
E. atroviridis, along with E. marginata, possess the ability to completely autotomize their bodies, and survive without their heart, kidneys, reproductive organs, etc. The method they use is unknown, but it is theorized the groove on their neck which is at the location where the head detaches plays a role in the autotomy, and the aforementioned kleptoplasty plays a role in keeping the slugs alive without the digestive system, but researchers are still unsure about how they manage to stay alive without their major organs. The bodies never regrew the head, and responded to tactile stimuli, but eventually stopped and grew pale, presumably from losing chloroplasts. Older individuals after autotomy did not feed and died after 10 days.

=== Function ===
The function of the autotomy is unknown. In an experiment, 82 E. atroviridis specimens were infected with a parasitic copepod, and three autotomized. The researchers suggested that the slugs autotomize as a reaction to the infection. Furthermore, all slugs who autotomized were infected with a parasite, and all regrew their bodies back with no parasite. The autotomy could not be a response to predation, as it takes several hours to autotomize. Additionally, researchers attempted to simulate a predator attack but no autotomy was attempted in the slug. Other theories for the function of the autotomy include escaping algae the slugs are tangled in and removing accumulated toxic chemicals.
