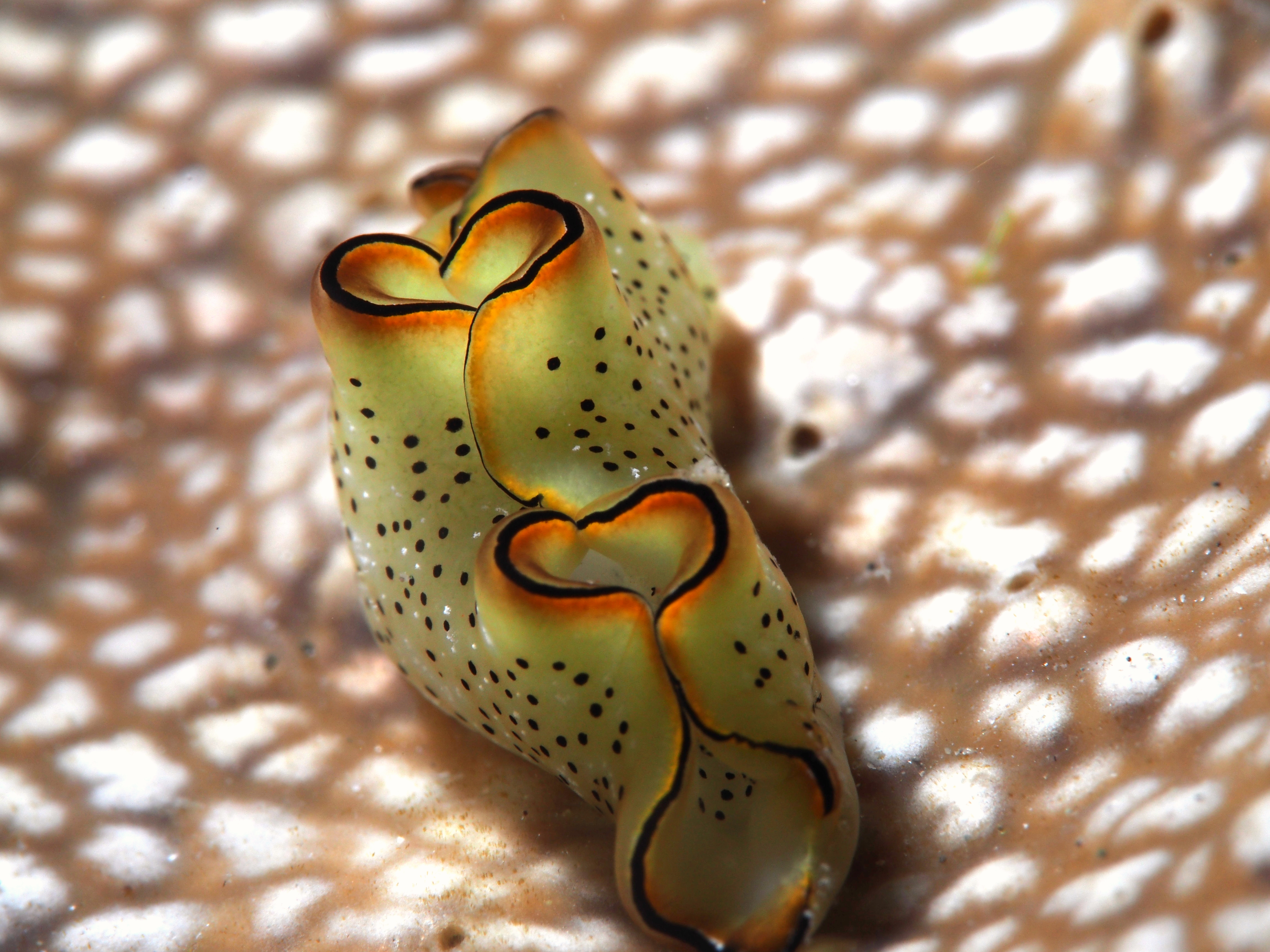

Scientific classification
- Kingdom: Animalia
- Phylum: Mollusca
- Class: Gastropoda
- Superorder: Sacoglossa
- Family: Plakobranchidae
- Genus: Elysia
- Species: E. marginata

Binomial name
- Elysia marginata (Pease, 1871)

Synonyms
- Pterogasteron marginatus (Pease, 1871)

= Elysia marginata =

Species of sea slug

Elysia marginata is a marine gastropod in the family Plakobranchidae. It is known for its ability to regenerate its whole body and heart after autotomizing it from its head.

== Distribution ==
While there are few records of its distribution, E.marginata is widely distributed in the Indo-Pacific ocean region and has been found living in depths of 0–10 metres (0–33 ft). It was first observed off of the Hawaiian Islands and Tahiti.

== Description ==
E. marginata is described as having a green body with black and cream spots. It has tall, thin parapodia with a black band along its parapodial edge and a submarginal orange band. This species can be distinguished from other Indo-Pacific species by the white band found between the orange and black marginal bands. E. marginata has both a sedentary and migratory form, with the sedentary form reaching up to 76 millimetres (3.0 in) in length, and the migratory rarely exceeding 25 millimetres (0.98 in).

== Ecology ==
Like other species such as Elysia ornata, Elysia marginata lives in shallow water and feeds on Bryopsis algae off the rocky bottom. E. marginata uses kleptoplasty to sequester the chloroplasts from the algae it consumes. These chloroplasts are stored in Elysia marginata's highly branched digestive gland that is lined by cells that maintain the ingested chloroplasts over its entire body.

Unlike other sea slugs, which can only shed minor body parts, Elysia marginata and Elysia atroviridis can autotomize their heads completely from the rest of their body. E. marginata separates its head from the transverse groove over the course of several hours. Due to the slow nature of body separation, it is suggested that body shedding is a controlled mechanism to eliminate parasites, as the time-consuming nature of this behavior is not an efficient way to avoid predators and imitated predators in studies did not induce autotomy. Elysia marginata has not been proven to autotomize to escape parasites. scientists only recently discovered this phenomenon in 2021, however, so it is relatively unresearched. Like other sacoglossans, E. marginata can survive solely by photosynthesis from kleptoplasty after separation from their digestive system.

Like other sea slugs, Sacoglossans are hermaphrodites and reproduce sexually. They produce dimorphic eggs with two distinct larval morphs: small eggs that develop into planktotrophic larvae and large eggs that develop into lecithotrophic larvae that develop without needing to consume plankton.
