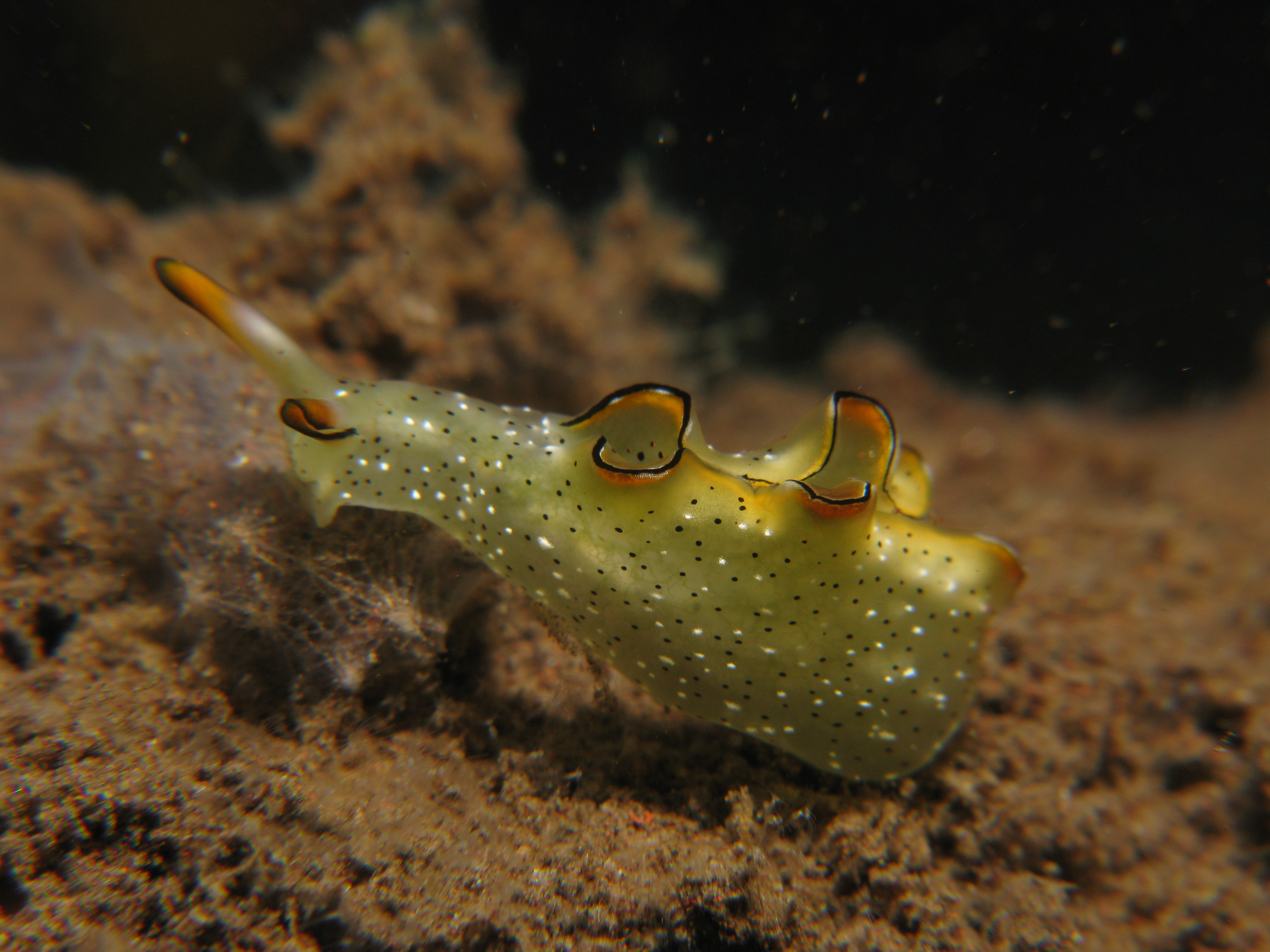
- A live individual of Elysia ornata, head end towards the left

Scientific classification
- Kingdom: Animalia
- Phylum: Mollusca
- Class: Gastropoda
- Superorder: Sacoglossa
- Superfamily: Plakobranchoidea
- Family: Plakobranchidae
- Genus: Elysia; Risso, 1818

Type species
- Notarchus timidus Risso, 1818

Species
- See text

Synonyms
- List: Actaeon Rang, 1829; Aplysiopterus Delle Chiaje, 1830; Checholysia Ortea, Caballer, Moro & Espinosa, 2005; Elysia (Elysia) Risso, 1818; Elysia (Elysiopterus) Pruvot-Fol, 1946; Elysia (Tridachia); Elysiella Verrill, 1872; Elysiella Bergh, 1871; Elysiobranchus Pruvot-Fol, 1930; Hydropsyche Kelaart, 1858; Pattyclaya Ev. Marcus, 1982; Pterogasteron Pease, 1860; Rhyzobranchus Cantraine, 1835; Thallepus Swainson, 1840; Thridachia P. Fischer, 1883; Tridachia Deshayes, 1857; Tridachiella MacFarland, 1924

= Elysia (gastropod) =

Genus of gastropods

Elysia is a genus of sea slugs, marine gastropod molluscs in the family Plakobranchidae. These animals are colorful sea slugs, and they can superficially resemble nudibranchs, but are not very closely related to them. Instead they are sacoglossans, commonly known as sap-sucking slugs.

Elysia sea slugs graze on algae and some species such as E. viridis and E. chlorotica hijack the chloroplasts for themselves (i.e. kleptoplasty). The chloroplasts end up lining the slug's digestive tract, enabling the slugs to survive solely by photosynthesis for several months at a time. This association is crucial for the development and maturing of the slug. Exactly how the slugs use the chloroplasts is unclear, as many of the proteins used by chloroplasts are encoded in the genome of the host cell. These proteins, numbering in the hundreds, are manufactured in the cell's nucleus, and then moved into the chloroplast, enabling it to survive. There has been a study regarding a member of the genus Elysia (E. chloritica), which states that there is horizontal gene transfer when the slugs ingest the algae. The study postulates that upon the ingestion of the algae, to keep the chloroplasts alive, E. chloritica steals genes via horizontal gene transfer to make proteins that maintain the chloroplasts. However, many other studies could not replicate the findings in the study and the claims remain disputed. Young specimens of E. atroviridis and E. marginata became known for their ability to regenerate the whole body from a severed head. This autotomy expels internal parasites.

This genus was previously sometimes considered to be in the family Stiligeridae, and was also previously placed in the family Elysiidae.

== Species ==
The following species are recognised in the genus Elysia:

- Elysia abei Baba, 1955
- Elysia amakusana Baba, 1955
- Elysia amuravela Ortea, 2017
- Elysia annedupontae Ortea, Caballer, Moro & Espinosa, 2005
- Elysia aowthai Mehrotra, Caballer, C. M. Scott, Arnold, Monchanin & Chavanich, 2020
- Elysia arena Carlson & Hoff, 1978
- Elysia asbecki Wägele, Stemmer, Burghardt & Händeler, 2010
- Elysia atroviridis Baba, 1955
- Elysia australis (Quoy & Gaimard, 1832)
- Elysia babai Pruvot-Fol, 1946
- Elysia bangtawaensis Swennen, 1998
- Elysia bella (Pease, 1860)
- Elysia bengalensis Swennen, 2011
- Elysia bennettae T. E. Thompson, 1973
- Elysia brycei (K. R. Jensen & F. E. Wells, 1990)
- Elysia buonoi Krug, Vendetti & Á. Valdés, 2016
- Elysia canguzua Er. Marcus, 1955
- Elysia catulus (Gould, 1870)
- Elysia chavelavargas Ortea, 2017
- Elysia chilkensis Eliot, 1916
- Elysia chlorotica Gould, 1870
- Elysia christinae Krug, Vendetti & Á. Valdés, 2016
- Elysia coodgeensis Angas, 1864
- Elysia cornigera Nuttall, 1989
- Elysia crispata Mörch, 1863
- Elysia deborahae Ortea, Caballer, Moro & Espinosa, 2005
- Elysia degeneri Ostergaard, 1955
- Elysia delcarmen Ortea, 2017
- Elysia diomedea (Bergh, 1894)
- Elysia ellenae Ortea, Espinosa & Caballer, 2013
- Elysia entredosaguas Ortea & Bacallado, 2014
- Elysia evelinae Er. Marcus, 1957
- Elysia expansa (O'Donoghue, 1924)
- Elysia faustula Bergh, 1871
- Elysia filicauda K. R. Jensen & F. E. Wells, 1990
- Elysia flava Verrill, 1901
- Elysia flavipunctata Ichikawa, 1993
- Elysia flavomacula K. R. Jensen, 1990
- Elysia frankenstein Ortea, 2018
- Elysia furvacauda Burn, 1958
- Elysia grandifolia Kelaart, 1858
- Elysia grandis Bergh, 1872
- Elysia hamatanii Baba, 1957
- Elysia hedgpethi Er. Marcus, 1961
- Elysia hendersoni Eliot, 1899
- Elysia hetta Perrone, 1990
- Elysia hirasei Baba, 1955
- Elysia japonica Eliot, 1913
- Elysia jaramilloi Ortea, Moro & Bacallado, 2017
- Elysia jibacoaensis Ortea, Moro, Caballer & Espinosa, 2011
- Elysia kushimotoensis Baba, 1957
- Elysia leucolegnote K. R. Jensen, 1990
- Elysia lobata Gould, 1852
- Elysia macnaei Marcus, 1982
- Elysia manriquei Ortea & Moro, 2009
- Elysia maoria Powell, 1937
- Elysia marcusi (Ev. Marcus, 1972)
- Elysia margaritae Fez, 1962
- Elysia marginata (Pease, 1871)
- Elysia mercieri (Pruvot-Fol, 1930)
- Elysia minima Ichikawa, 1993
- Elysia nealae Ostergaard, 1955
- Elysia nigrocapitata Baba, 1957
- Elysia nigropunctata (Pease, 1871)
- Elysia nisbeti T. E. Thompson, 1977
- Elysia obtusa Baba, 1938
- Elysia oerstedii Mörch, 1859
- Elysia orientalis Ortea, Moro, Caballer & Espinosa, 2011
- Elysia ornata (Swainson, 1840)
- Elysia papillosa A. E. Verrill, 1901
- Elysia patagonica Munian & Ortea, 1997
- Elysia patina Ev. Marcus, 1980
- Elysia pawliki Krug, Vendetti & Á. Valdés, 2016
- Elysia pilosa Risbec, 1928
- Elysia pratensis Ortea & Espinosa, 1996
- Elysia punctata Kelaart, 1858
- Elysia pusilla (Bergh, 1871)
- Elysia rubeni Martín-Hervás, Carmona, K. R. Jensen, Licchelli, Vitale & Cervera, 2020
- Elysia rufescens (Pease, 1871)
- Elysia sanfermin Ortea, 2017
- Elysia serca Er. Marcus, 1955
- Elysia siamensis Swennen, 1998
- Elysia singaporensis Swennen, 2011
- Elysia slimora Er. Marcus & Ev. Marcus, 1966
- Elysia stylifera (K. R. Jensen, 1997)
- Elysia subornata A. E. Verrill, 1901
- Elysia sugashimae Baba, 1955
- Elysia thompsoni K. R. Jensen, 1993
- Elysia thysanopoda Bergh, 1905
- Elysia timida (Risso, 1818)
- Elysia tokarensis Baba, 1957
- Elysia tomentosa K. R. Jensen, 1997
- Elysia translucens Pruvot-Fol, 1957
- Elysia trilobata Heller & T. E. Thompson, 1983
- Elysia trisinuata Baba, 1949
- Elysia velutinus Pruvot-Fol, 1947
- Elysia verrucosa K. R. Jensen, 1985
- Elysia viridis (Montagu, 1804)
- Elysia vreelandae Ev. Marcus & Er. Marcus, 1970
- Elysia yaeyamana Baba, 1936
- Elysia zemi Krug, Vendetti & Á. Valdés, 2016
- Elysia zuleicae Ortea & Espinosa, 2002

Species brought into synonymy

- Elysia arena Carlson & Hoff, 1978: synonym of Pattyclaya arena (Carlson & Hoff, 1978)
- Elysia bedeckta MacFarland, 1966: synonym of Elysia hedgpethi Er. Marcus, 1961
- Elysia cauze scops Ev. Marcus & Er. Marcus, 1967: synonym of Elysia scops Ev. Marcus & Er. Marcus, 1967
- Elysia gracilis Risbec, 1928: synonym of Thuridilla gracilis (Risbec, 1928)
- Elysia halimedae Macnae, 1954: synonym of Elysia pusilla (Bergh, 1871)
- Elysia picta A. E. Verrill, 1901: synonym of Thuridilla picta (A. E. Verrill, 1901)
- Elysia pruvotfolae Er. Marcus, 1957: synonym of Elysia crispata Mørch, 1863
- Elysia schrammi Mörch, 1863: synonym of Elysia crispata Mørch, 1863
- Elysia splendida Grube, 1861: synonym of Thuridilla hopei (Vérany, 1853)
- Elysia thysanopoda Bergh, 1905: synonym of Thuridilla thysanopoda (Bergh, 1905)
- Elysia vataae Risbec, 1928: synonym of Thuridilla vataae (Risbec, 1928)
- Elysia verrilli Pruvot-Fol, 1946: synonym of Elysia crispata Mørch, 1863

Taxa inquirenda:

- Elysia fezi Vilella, 1968
- Elysia pruvotae Risbec, 1953
