= Elysia serca =

Scientific classification
- Kingdom: Animalia
- Phylum: Mollusca
- Class: Gastropoda
- Superorder: Sacoglossa
- Family: Plakobranchidae
- Genus: Elysia
- Species: E. serca

Binomial name
- Elysia serca Er. Marcus, 1955

Species of gastropod

Elysia serca, the seagrass elysia or Caribbean seagrass elysia, is a species of sea slug, a marine gastropod mollusc in the family Plakobranchidae. Although this sea slug resembles a nudibranch, it is not a nudibranch; it belongs to the clade, Sacoglossa, the "sap-sucking" sea slugs. It was first described by Marcus in 1955 from specimens found in Brazil.

== Taxonomy ==
Elysia clena is a species first described from Curaçao by Marcus in 1970. Jensen (1982) determined that it was a junior synonym of Elysia serca, first described by Marcus from Brazil in 1955. This was on the basis of the morphology of the radular teeth, the dorsal venation and biological observations.

Elysia serca also bears great similarities to Elysia catulus (Gould, 1870), a species with a more northerly distribution, and Jensen (1983) considers that E. serca may be a subspecies or ecotype of E. catulus. Features in common between the two include the anatomy of the mouth, the shape of the radular teeth and the paths taken by the dorsal veins.

== Description ==
Elysia serca is a small, slender sea slug with a maximum length of 8 millimetres (0.31 in). The parapodia are less well developed than is the case in many other Elysia species and Elysia serca has a relatively large head. The characteristic radular teeth have the cusps bent at right angles to their bases. The base colour is some shade of brown or olive with many small patches of white and three larger white patches, two on the parapodia and one on the back near the heart.

== Distribution and habitat ==
Elysia serca is found in shallow waters in the western Atlantic from Florida south to Brazil. It was originally described from the southern end of its range, where it was found on brown algae and the green alga Ulva, on which it was presumably feeding. In Florida however it feeds on seagrasses including Halophila engelmannii, Halodule wrightii and Thalassia at depths of up to a few metres. Elysia catulus on the other hand, feeds on the seagrass Zostera and is found on the North American coast between South Carolina and Nova Scotia.

== Biology ==
In Florida, there is a great variation in the size of populations of Elysia serca at different times of year. This is likely to be because the life span is less than a year and recruitment, and the establishment of new populations, comes as a result of planktonic larvae arriving from elsewhere and settling.

Feeding is done by puncturing the plant cells with the radular tooth and sucking out the liquid contents. Elysia serca shows a preference for, and grows faster on, Halophila engelmannii. This may be because the plant has large epidermal cells which are easy to exploit or because of the absence of tannins, a chemical defence against herbivores used by some seagrasses.
