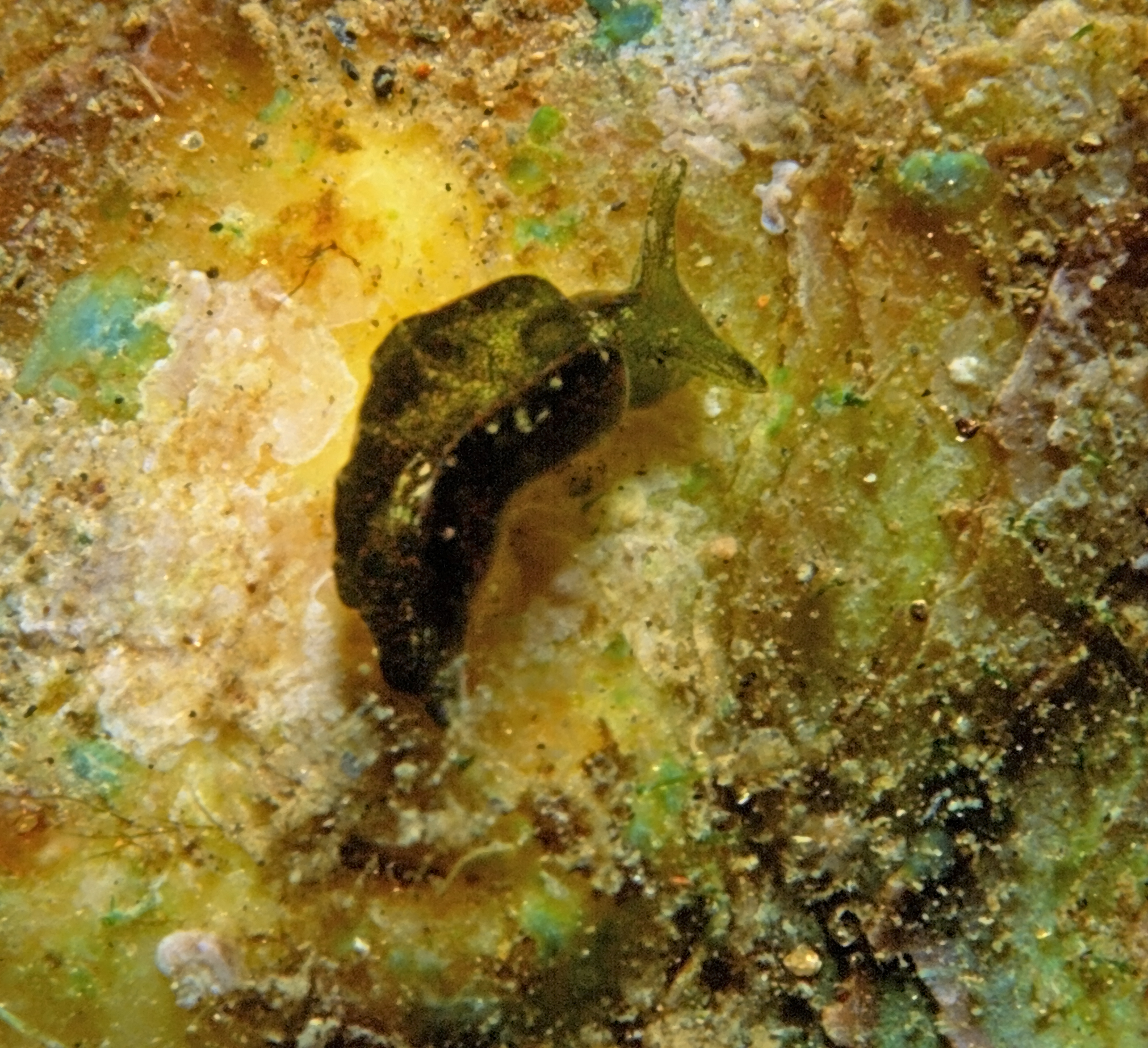
- A live individual of Elysia viridis

Scientific classification
- Kingdom: Animalia
- Phylum: Mollusca
- Class: Gastropoda
- Superorder: Sacoglossa
- Family: Plakobranchidae
- Genus: Elysia
- Species: E. viridis

Binomial name
- Elysia viridis (Montagu, 1804)

= Elysia viridis =

Sap-sucking slug

Species of gastropod

Elysia viridis is a sacoglossan sea slug of the family Plakobranchidae. They are occasionally nicknamed the sap sucking slugs for their ability to suck the cytoplasm out of the algae they prey upon,. Adult length is considered to be between 15 and 20 mm long, and they vary in color from greens to brownish hues. Elysia viridis is one of few organisms capable of kleptoplasty; when consuming the cytoplasm of its algal prey E. viridis can retain the chloroplasts in working condition, and being able to benefit from their continued photosynthesis.

== Description ==
Adult length of E. viridis ranges between 15 and 20 mm, with a healthy adult weight of 15–20 mg. The surface of the slug is covered in tiny spots of red, yellow, blue or green that are reported to have a glistening appearance. Parapodia extend from the sides of the slug, and are the main location of captured chloroplasts. Rhinophores extend upward from its head. Elysia viridis feed using radular teeth, which in this species, E. gordanae, can vary in design based upon the diet of the individual.

== Distribution ==
Elysia viridis is located in the Northeastern Atlantic, primarily around the British Islands, but has been found further north in Sweden and Norway, as well as in the Mediterranean Sea. A report of E. viridis being found in south Africa was published in 1987, but the identification that specimen was later changed to Elysia sp. by the same author. Elysia viridis occurs in the intertidal zone typically submerged on its algal prey between 1 and 5 meters below the surface.

== Ecology ==
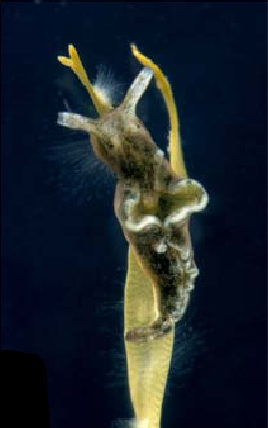
Elysia viridis on algae

Elysia viridis feed on algae, primarily of the genus Codium, with a noted favorability towards C. fragile, C. sericea, and C. rupestris. E. viridis has been found to be less selective of algal hosts than other members of Elysia. E. viridis deposit coiled egg masses onto the thallus of its prey, or on nearby underwater surfaces, that hatch into a larval stage called a veliger. Veliger are planktotrophic and consume free floating unicellular algae. Once the propodeum develops on the larvae they search for a macroalgal host, contact with which appears to trigger a metamorphosis into the adult form, but the trigger for this metamorphosis is unconfirmed.

=== Kleptoplasty ===
Elysia viridis is most notable for its capability of performing kleptoplasty, and maintaining a subcellular endosymbiotic relationship with chloroplasts derived from the algae in the genus Codium, most often C. fragile. When consuming the cytoplasm of the algae, E. viridis is able to retain the chloroplasts in a functional state; chloroplasts are phagocytized, while digesting the other cytoplasmic contents are digested. The captured chloroplasts (kleptoplasts) retain their ability to photosynthesize, the photosynthates of which can benefit the slug nutritionally. Kleptoplasts can also be broken down and used as a pre-stored energy source in situations where the slug is deprived of food sources and light.

== See also ==
- Elysia chlorotica
- Elysia clarki
- Codium fragile
- Kleptoplasty
- Intertidal zone
- Codium
- Rhinophore
- Parapodium
- Radula
