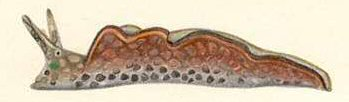
- Original drawing used by Pease when he described the species in 1871.

Scientific classification
- Kingdom: Animalia
- Phylum: Mollusca
- Class: Gastropoda
- Superorder: Sacoglossa
- Family: Plakobranchidae
- Genus: Elysia
- Species: E. rufescens

Binomial name
- Elysia rufescens (Pease, 1871)

= Elysia rufescens =

Species of gastropod

Elysia rufescens is a species of sea slug, a marine gastropod mollusc in the family Plakobranchidae. This sea slug resembles a nudibranch but is not classified in that order of gastropods, instead belonging to a closely related clade, Sacoglossa, the "sap-sucking" sea slugs. This species was first described by Pease from Tahiti in 1871.

== Description ==
Elysia rufescens is olive green with large white spots, often in a reticulated pattern, and grows to about 6 centimetres (2.4 in). The parapodia are somewhat convoluted and have dark blue edges and a submarginal orange line. The rhinophores are rolled and have blunt, greyish ends.

== Distribution ==
Elysia rufescens is found in the Pacific Ocean. Its range includes the coastlines of South Africa, Réunion, Thailand, Myanmar, the Philippines, Japan, Guam, Samoa, Tahiti, Hawaii and Australia.

== Biology ==
Elysia rufescens feeds on green filamentous algae such as Bryopsis pennata, which it rasps with each of a series of rachidian teeth. E. rufescens grazes on Bryopsis sp., an alga that defends itself from predators by using peptide toxins with fatty acids, called kahalalides. A bacterial obligate symbiont produces many defensive molecules, including kahalalides, in order to protect the alga. This bacteria is able to use substrates derived from the host in order to synthesize the toxins. The Hawaiian Sea Slug grazes on the alga in order to accumulate kahalalide. This uptake of the toxin, which the slug is immune to, allows it to also become toxic to predators. This shared ability, both originating from the bacteria, provide protection within the marine ecosystems.
