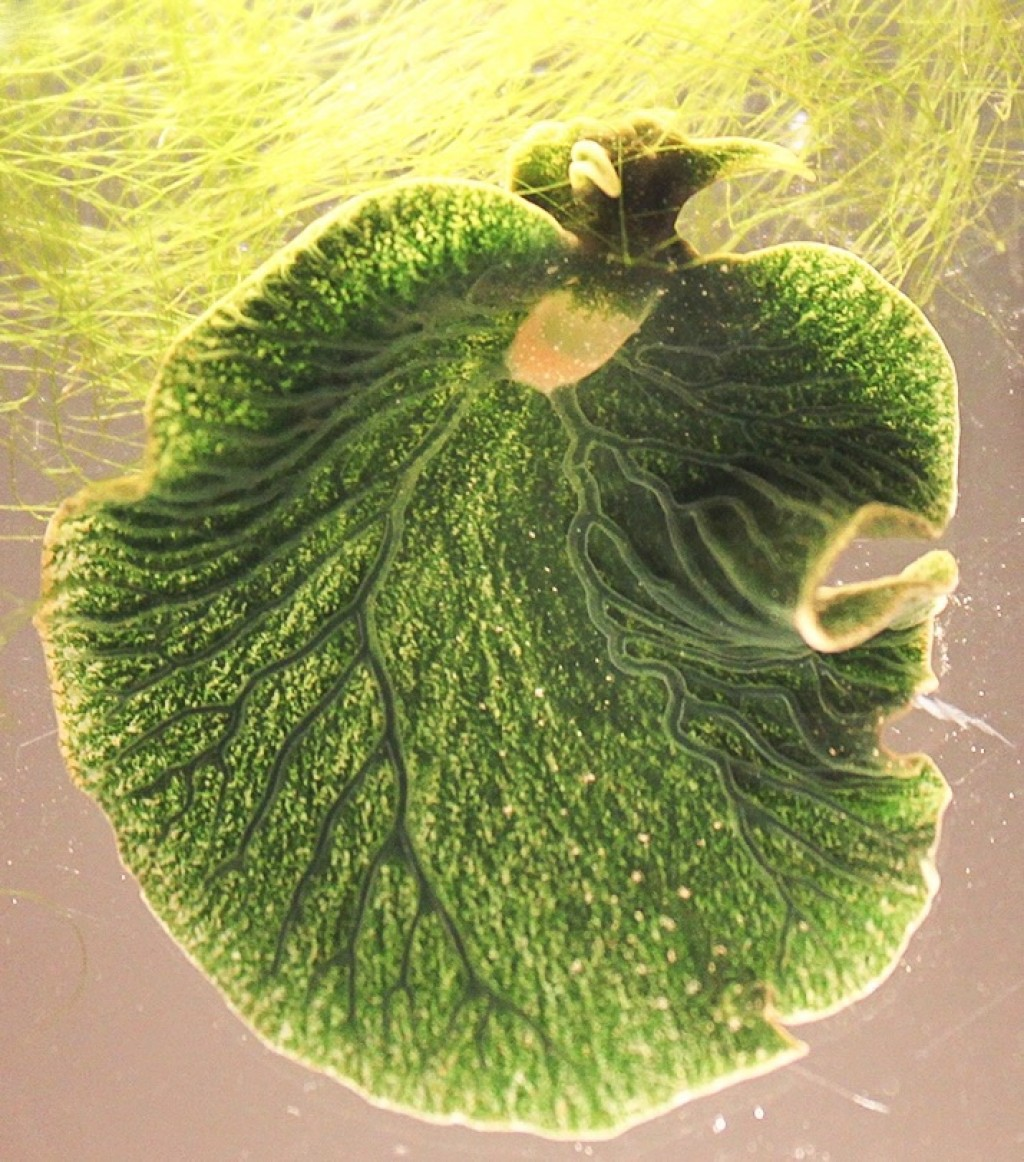
- An E. chlorotica individual consuming its obligate algal food Vaucheria litorea

Scientific classification
- Kingdom: Animalia
- Phylum: Mollusca
- Class: Gastropoda
- Superorder: Sacoglossa
- Family: Plakobranchidae
- Genus: Elysia
- Species: E. chlorotica

Binomial name
- Elysia chlorotica Gould, 1870

= Elysia chlorotica =

Eastern emerald elysia

Species of gastropod

Elysia chlorotica (common name the eastern emerald elysia) is a small-to-medium-sized species of green sea slug, a marine opisthobranch gastropod mollusc. This sea slug superficially resembles a nudibranch, yet it does not belong to that clade. Instead it is a member of the clade Sacoglossa, the sap-sucking sea slugs. Some members of this group use chloroplasts from the algae they eat for photosynthesis, a phenomenon known as kleptoplasty. Elysia chlorotica is one species of such "solar-powered sea slugs". It lives in a subcellular endosymbiotic relationship with chloroplasts of the marine heterokont alga Vaucheria litorea.

== Distribution ==
Elysia chlorotica can be found along the east coast of the United States, including the states of Massachusetts, Connecticut, New York, New Jersey, Maryland, Rhode Island, Florida, (east Florida and west Florida) and Texas. They can also be found as far north as Nova Scotia, Canada.

== Ecology ==
This species is most commonly found in salt marshes, tidal marshes, pools, and shallow creeks, at depths of 0 to 0.5 m (50 cm) .

== Description ==
Adult Elysia chlorotica are usually bright green in color owing to the presence of Vaucheria litorea chloroplasts in the cells of the slug's digestive diverticula. Since the slug does not have a protective shell or any other means of protection, the green color obtained from the algae also functions as a camouflage against predators. By taking on the green color from the chloroplasts of the algal cells, the slugs are able to blend in with the sea bed, helping them improve their chances of survival and fitness. However, they can occasionally appear reddish or greyish in colour, which is thought to depend on the amount of chlorophyll in the branches of the digestive gland throughout the body. This species can also have very small red or white spots scattered over the body. A juvenile, prior to feeding on algae, is brown with red pigment spots due to the absence of chloroplasts. Elysia chlorotica have a typical elysiid shape with large lateral parapodia which can fold over to enclose the body. Elysia chlorotica can grow up to 60 mm in length but are more commonly found between 20 mm to 30 mm in length.

== Feeding ==
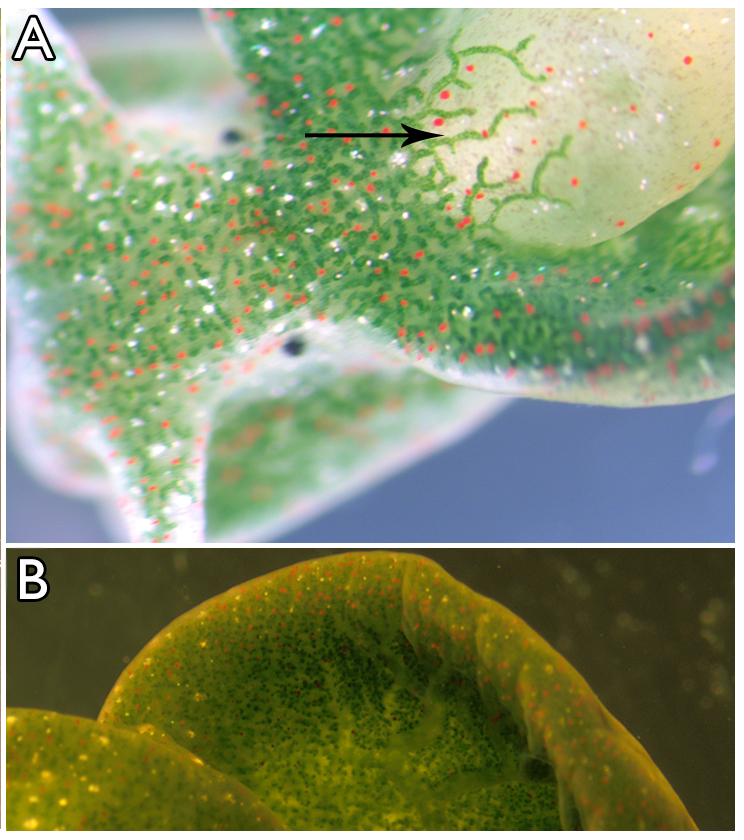
(A) A defined tubule of the digestive diverticula extending into the parapodial region of the animal (arrow). The digestive system consists of densely packed tubules that branch throughout the animal's body. Each tubule is made up of a layer of single cells containing animal organelles and numerous algal plastids. This cell layer surrounds the lumen. (B) Magnified image of the epidermis of E. chlorotica showing densely packed plastids. The animals are light grey in color without their resident plastids, which contribute chlorophyll to render the sea slugs bright green.

Elysia chlorotica feeds on the intertidal alga Vaucheria litorea. It punctures the algal cell wall with its radula, then holds the algal strand firmly in its mouth and sucks out the contents as from a straw. Instead of digesting the entire cell contents, or passing the contents through its gut unscathed, it retains only the chloroplasts, by storing them within its extensive digestive system. It then takes up the live chloroplasts into its own gut cells as organelles and maintains them alive and functional for many months. The acquisition of chloroplasts begins immediately following metamorphosis from the veliger stage when the juvenile sea slugs begin to feed on the Vaucheria litorea cells. Juvenile slugs are brown with red pigment spots until they feed upon the algae, at which point they become green. This is caused by the distribution of the chloroplasts throughout the extensively branched gut. At first the slug needs to feed continually on algae to retain the chloroplasts, but over time the chloroplasts become more stably incorporated into the cells of the gut enabling the slug to remain green without further feeding. Some Elysia chlorotica slugs have even been known to be able to use photosynthesis for up to a year after only a few feedings.

The chloroplasts of the algae are incorporated into the cell through the process of phagocytosis in which the cells of the sea slug engulf the cells of the algae and make the chloroplasts a part of its own cellular content. The incorporation of chloroplasts within the cells of Elysia chlorotica allows the slug to capture energy directly from light, as most plants do, through the process of photosynthesis. E. chlorotica can, during time periods where algae is not readily available as a food supply, survive for months. It was once thought that this survival depended on the sugars produced through photosynthesis performed by the chloroplasts, and it has been found that the chloroplasts can survive and function for up to nine or even ten months.

However further study on several similar species showed these sea slugs do just as well when they are deprived of light. Sven Gould from Heinrich-Heine University in Düsseldorf and his colleagues showed that even when photosynthesis was blocked, the slugs could survive without food for a long time, and seemed to fare just as well as food-deprived slugs exposed to light. They starved six specimens of P. ocellatus for 55 days, keeping two in the dark, treating two with chemicals that inhibited photosynthesis, and providing two with appropriate light. All survived and all lost weight at about the same rate. The authors also denied food to six specimens of E. timida and kept them in complete darkness for 88 days — and all survived.

In another study, it was shown that E. chlorotica definitely have a way to support the survival of their chloroplasts. After the eight-month period, despite the fact that the Elysia chlorotica were less green and more yellowish in colour, the majority of the chloroplasts within the slugs appeared to have remained intact while maintaining their fine structure. By spending less energy on activities such as finding food, the slugs can invest this precious energy into other important activities. Although Elysia chlorotica are unable to synthesize their own chloroplasts, the ability to maintain the chloroplasts in a functional state indicates that Elysia chlorotica could possess photosynthesis-supporting genes within its own nuclear genome, possibly acquired through horizontal gene transfer. Since chloroplast DNA alone encodes for just 10% of the proteins required for proper photosynthesis, scientists investigated the Elysia chlorotica genome for potential genes that could support chloroplast survival and photosynthesis. The researchers found a vital algal gene, psbO (a nuclear gene encoding for a manganese-stabilizing protein within the photosystem II complex) in the sea slug's DNA, identical to the algal version. They concluded that the gene was likely to have been acquired through horizontal gene transfer, as it was already present in the eggs and sex cells of Elysia chlorotica. It is due to this ability to utilize horizontal gene transfer that the chloroplasts are able to be used as efficiently as they have been. If an organism did not incorporate the chloroplasts and corresponding genes into its own cells and genome, the algal cells would need to be fed upon more often due to a lack of efficiency in the use and preservation of the chloroplasts. This once again leads to a conservation of energy, as stated earlier, allowing the slugs to focus on more important activities such as mating and avoiding predation.

More recent analyses, however, were unable to identify any actively expressed algal nuclear genes in Elysia cholorotica, or in the similar species Elysia timida and Plakobranchus ocellatus. These results weaken support for the horizontal gene transfer hypothesis. A 2014 report utilizing fluorescent in situ hybridization (FISH) to localize an algal nuclear gene, prk, found evidence of horizontal gene transfer. However, these results have since been called into question, as FISH analysis can be deceptive and cannot prove horizontal gene transfer without comparison to the Elysia cholorotica genome, which the researchers failed to do.

The exact mechanism allowing for the longevity of chloroplasts once captured by Elysia cholorotica despite its lack of active algal nuclear genes remains unknown. However, some light has been shed on Elysia timida and its algal food. Genomic analysis of Acetabularia acetabulum and Vaucheria litorea, the primary food sources of Elysia timida, has revealed that their chloroplasts produce ftsH, another protein essential for photosystem II repair. In land plants, this gene is always encoded in the nucleus but is present in the chloroplasts of most algae. An ample supply of ftsH could in principle contribute greatly to the observed kleptoplast longevity in Elysia cholorotica and Elysia timida.

== Life cycle ==
Adult Elysia chlorotica are simultaneous hermaphrodites. When sexually mature, each animal produces both sperm and eggs at the same time. However, self-fertilization is not common within this species. Instead, Elysia chlorotica cross-copulate. After the eggs have been fertilized within the slug (fertilization is internal), Elysia chlorotica lay their fertilized eggs in long strings.

=== Cleavage ===
In the life cycle of Elysia chlorotica, cleavage is holoblastic and spiral. This means that the eggs cleave completely (holoblastic); and each cleavage plane is at an oblique angle to the animal-vegetal axis of the egg. The result of this is that tiers of cells are produced, each tier lying in the furrows between cells of the tier below it. At the end of cleavage, the embryo forms a stereoblastula, meaning a blastula without a clear central cavity.

=== Gastrulation ===
Elysia chlorotica gastrulation is by epiboly: the ectoderm spreads to envelope the mesoderm and endoderm.

=== Larval stage ===
After the embryo passes through a trochophore-like stage during development, it then hatches as a veliger larva. The veliger larva has a shell and ciliated velum. The larva uses the ciliated velum to swim as well as to bring food to its mouth. The veliger larva feeds on phytoplankton in the sea-water column. After the food is brought to the mouth by the ciliated velum, it is moved down the digestive tract to the stomach. In the stomach, food is sorted and then moved on to the digestive gland, where the food is digested and the nutrients are absorbed by the epithelial cells of the digestive gland.

== See also ==
- Elysia clarki
- Elysia viridis
- Karyoklepty
