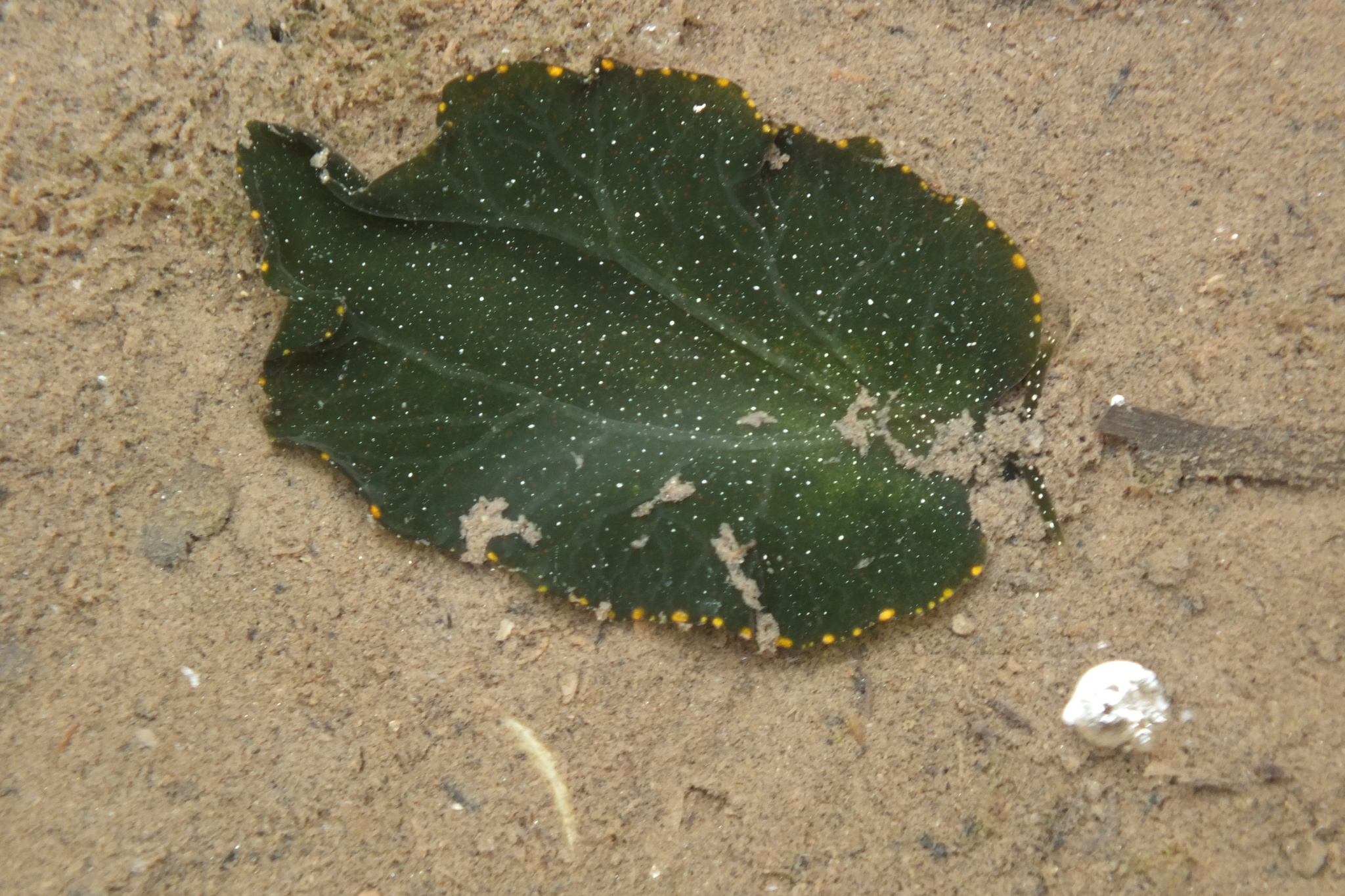

Scientific classification
- Kingdom: Animalia
- Phylum: Mollusca
- Class: Gastropoda
- Superorder: Sacoglossa
- Family: Plakobranchidae
- Genus: Elysia
- Species: E. bangtawaensis

Binomial name
- Elysia bangtawaensis Swennen, 1997

= Elysia bangtawaensis =

Species of gastropod

Elysia bangtawaensis (also known as the Mangrove Leaf Slug) is a species of sea slug, a marine gastropod mollusc in the family Plakobranchidae. Although this sea slug resembles a nudibranch, it is not a nudibranch but is part of a rather different clade, the sacoglossans, also known as the "sap-sucking" sea slugs.

Elysia bangtawaensis was first described by Swennen in 1997 from specimens found in mangrove swamps in southern Thailand. The specific name was given to honour the people of Bang Tawa village, the type locality of the species. The author stated that this was because the villagers "had protected their forest against the shrimp culture companies that are converting large parts of the natural productive and complex coastal ecosystems into bio-industrial deserts".

== Description ==
Elysia bangtawaensis is dorso-ventrally flattened and grows to about 35 millimetres (1.4 in) in length. The parapodia are very thin but wide, edged with 12 to 40 orange spots. Both dorsal and ventral surfaces are a dark green colour, lightly speckled with orange and white dots and with some small opaque white spots.

== Distribution and habitat ==
Elysia bangtawaensis was first found in mangrove swamps in southern Thailand, but has since also been identified in eastern Australia and Goa. The habitat in Queensland was intertidal muddy creeks; the sea slugs were found on the sediment with their parapodia extended, such that the animals closely resembled fallen green mangrove leaves.
