= Elysia lobata =

Scientific classification
- Kingdom: Animalia
- Phylum: Mollusca
- Class: Gastropoda
- Superorder: Sacoglossa
- Family: Plakobranchidae
- Genus: Elysia
- Species: E. lobata

Binomial name
- Elysia lobata Gould, 1852

Species of gastropod

Elysia lobata is a species of sea slug, a marine gastropod mollusc in the family Plakobranchidae. This sea slug resembles a nudibranch, but it is not closely related to that order of gastropods, instead it is a sacoglossan.

== Description ==
Elysia lobata can grow to a length of 15 millimetres (0.59 in). In his original short description of the species in 1852, Augustus Addison Gould wrote: "Animal slug-like, greenish, dotted with black, and bordered with yellow; edge of mantle expanded in to a three lobed lateral wing. Head small with very large and long tentacles, tipped with sky-blue".

== Distribution ==
Elysia lobata is found in Hawaii, the Marshall Islands and parts of Japan.
