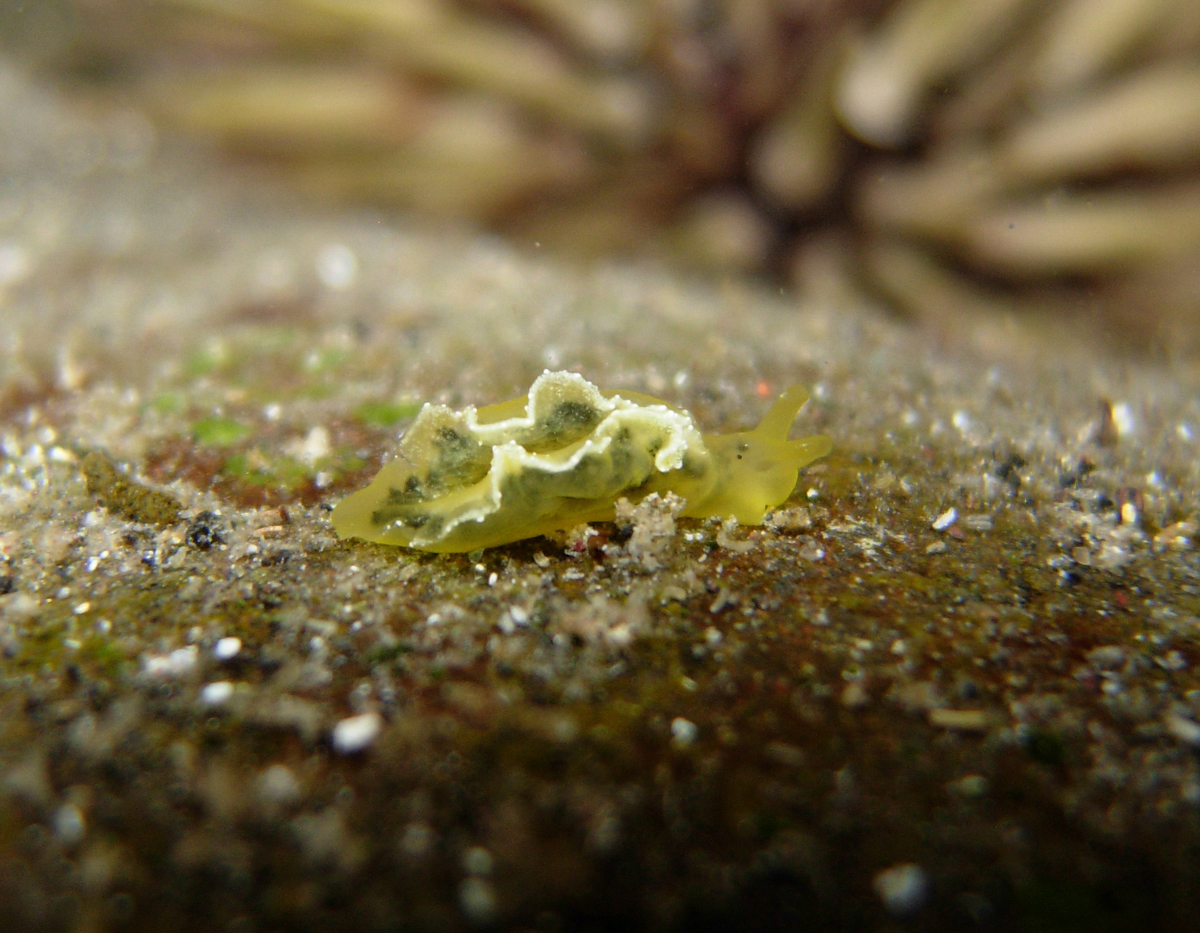

Scientific classification
- Kingdom: Animalia
- Phylum: Mollusca
- Class: Gastropoda
- Superorder: Sacoglossa
- Family: Plakobranchidae
- Genus: Elysia
- Species: E. obtusa

Binomial name
- Elysia obtusa Baba 1938

= Elysia obtusa =

Species of gastropod

Elysia obtusa is a species of sea slug, a marine gastropod mollusc in the family Plakobranchidae. This sea slug resembles a nudibranch but is not closely related to that order of gastropods, instead it is a sacoglossan.

== Description ==
Elysia obtusa grows to about 15 millimetres (0.59 in) long. It is a translucent golden green colour, sparsely covered with white spots. The broad parapodia are distinctively rimmed with white. They are sometimes a much darker shade of green than the rest of the body but that is believed to be when the animal has recently fed and the pigment of the chlorophyll shows through.

== Distribution ==
Elysia obtusa is found in the western Pacific Ocean, its range extending from Hong Kong and Japan to eastern Australia at depths of up to 10 metres (33 ft).
