= Elysia grandifolia =

Scientific classification
- Kingdom: Animalia
- Phylum: Mollusca
- Class: Gastropoda
- Superorder: Sacoglossa
- Family: Plakobranchidae
- Genus: Elysia
- Species: E. grandifolia

Binomial name
- Elysia grandifolia Kelaart,1858

Species of gastropod

Elysia grandifolia is a species of sea slug, a marine gastropod mollusc in the family Plakobranchidae native to the waters off southern India and Sri Lanka. It has colonised the waters of the eastern Mediterranean Sea.

== Taxonomy ==
Edward Frederick Kelaart described the species in 1858 as Elysia grandifolia. He was unsure of its placement within the genus, and considered the new genus name Hydropsyche as an alternative. Kelaart was a military surgeon who became interested in marine life after seeing an aquarium in London, and set about describing nudibranchs off the waters of Ceylon (Sri Lanka), where he was stationed.

== Description ==
Sometimes reaching 12 cm (4.8 in) long, Elysia grandifolia has a light green head and body, marked with white and more rarely black spots. The head and neck are bare, apart from bearing two tentacles folded along the sides of the head. The body is wider at the front and tapers to a point at the rear, and lacks a distinct foot. The mouth lies underneath. Running along the length of the body on each side is a veiny green wing-like membrane—known as a parapodium—with black and gold margin. Laterally it can measure 6.35 cm (2.5 in) across with wings expanded. Kelaart wrote, "The whole animal gives one the idea of a large leaf and, when moving, that of a butterfly.", adding that the pulsating heart was visible in the middle of its back.

== Distribution ==
This marine species is found on seaweed in the waters off Sri Lanka and southern India. It is an introduced species in the eastern basin of the Mediterranean Sea, where it has been recorded off the coast of Turkey and Israel.
