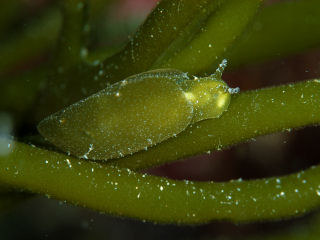

Scientific classification
- Kingdom: Animalia
- Phylum: Mollusca
- Class: Gastropoda
- Superorder: Sacoglossa
- Family: Plakobranchidae
- Genus: Elysia
- Species: E. trisinuata

Binomial name
- Elysia trisinuata Baba, 1949

= Elysia trisinuata =

Species of gastropod

Elysia trisinuata is a species of sea slug, a marine gastropod mollusc in the family Plakobranchidae. This sea slug resembles a nudibranch but is not closely related to that order of gastropods, instead belonging to another clade, Sacoglossa, the "sap-sucking" sea slugs.

== Description ==
Elysia trisinuata is pale green with minute orange spots. The colour is provided by the chloroplasts which are found in fine ducts in the body wall. The parapodia are slightly undulating and usually have three folds. They are folded over the slug's back and scattered with conical white papillae. The rhinophores have blunt, greyish ends.

== Distribution ==
Elysia trisinuata is found in the eastern Pacific Ocean off the coasts of Japan, southern China, Hong Kong and the Hainan Islands. It occurs in shallow waters and the intertidal zone where it feeds on algae including Codium arabicum.
