= Elysia abei =

Scientific classification
- Kingdom: Animalia
- Phylum: Mollusca
- Class: Gastropoda
- Superorder: Sacoglossa
- Family: Plakobranchidae
- Genus: Elysia
- Species: E. abei

Binomial name
- Elysia abei Baba, 1955

Species of gastropod

Elysia abei is a species of sea slug, a marine gastropod mollusc in the family Plakobranchidae. They are found off the Pacific coast of Japan in Sagami Bay.
