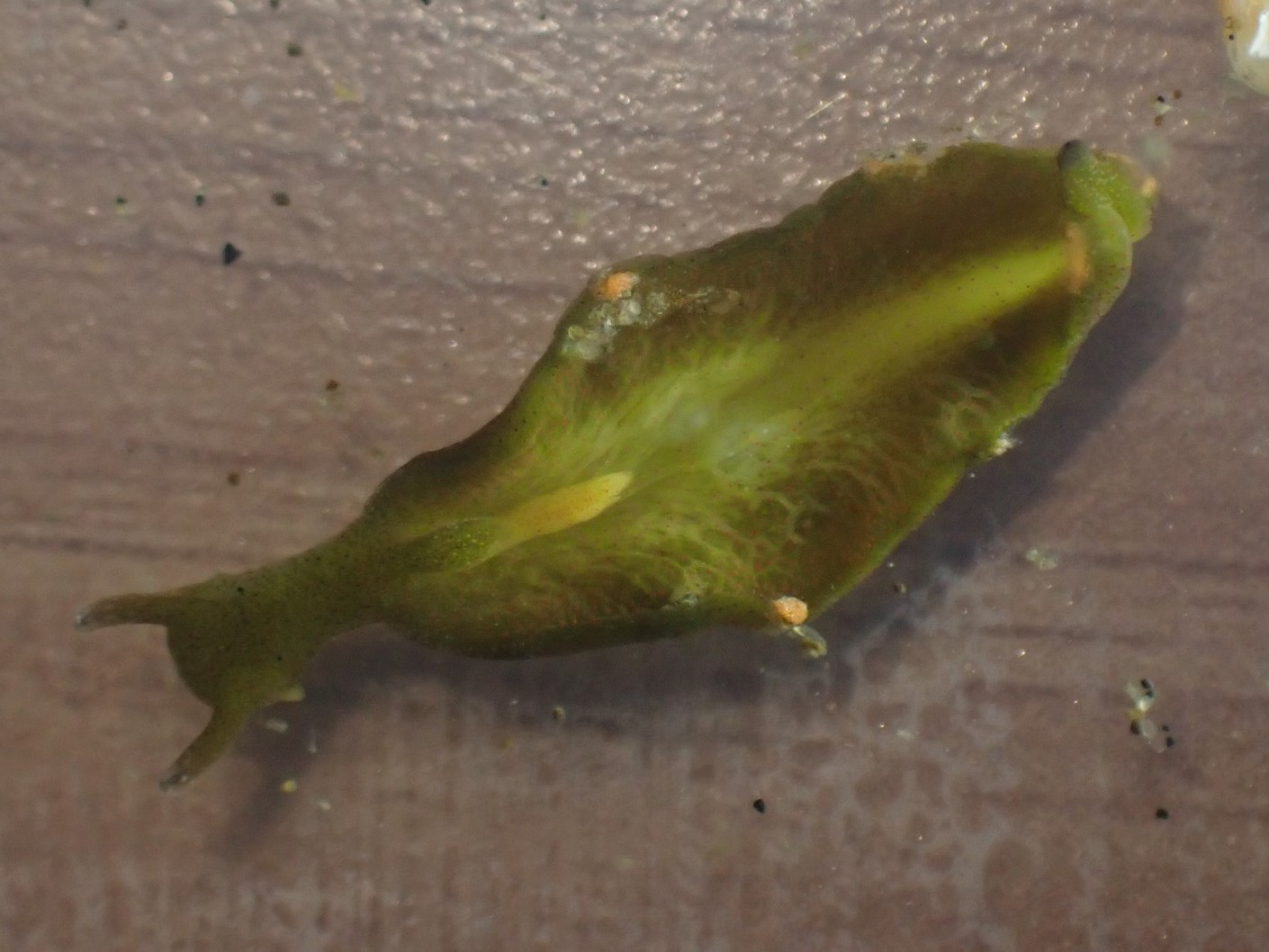

Scientific classification
- Kingdom: Animalia
- Phylum: Mollusca
- Class: Gastropoda
- Family: Plakobranchidae
- Genus: Elysia
- Species: E. maoria

Binomial name
- Elysia maoria Powell, 1937

= Elysia maoria =

Species of gastropod

Elysia maoria is a species of marine gastropod mollusk in the family Plankobranchidae. It is found off of New Zealand.

== Description ==
As a type of sea slug, Elysia maoria does not have a shell. Sacoglossans are also known as “sap sucking slugs” with a single row of teeth on the radula used for sucking algae. They are small, green oval-like creatures using parapodia for movement. Parapodia are the muscular appendages used similarly to an undulating fin to swim, making wavy movements. It is believed that Elysia maoria live a long planktonic stage after hatching, but not much is known about these creatures. This species reaches sexual maturity once it has surpassed 20mm in length. They typically develop to be 25-26mm long once fully grown.

Elysia maoria is an herbivore that utilizes its radula with a single row of teeth to latch onto algae and suck fluids out of it. They are then digested. Some Elysia species such as E. chlorotica are known to keep the chloroplasts to photosynthesize. It is not known if E. maoria engages in this process known as kleptoplasty as well.

== Distribution and habitat ==
E. maoria can be found in the New Zealand exclusive economic zone. It primarily lives in benthic, temperate zones along the shorelines of islands. It can be found making habitats and laying eggs on top of the pads of Codium, a common green alga.

== Reproduction ==
Elysia maoria have gonad follicles inside of their parapodia. Males hypodermically impregnate females, meaning that their penis pierces the body wall of the females, releasing sperm into their body cavity, beneath their skin that then finds its way to the eggs. The fertilized ova then “pass to the exterior through the glandular oviduct where they receive an albumen coat and a membrane and are bound into a ribbon by two mucous coats.”

The larvae have been photographed living on Codium species in Sacoglossans flattened spirals, which are long egg ribbons that protect the eggs until the larvae are ready to hatch. The larva hatch approximately two weeks later.

Males have sperm-producing follicles with branched prostate glands above them and reticulate albumen glands below them. Their penis lacks a hollow spine, unlike other Elysia species, leading scientists to question how it is able to penetrate the female. The males begin sexual behavior before the females do, indicating that they reach the proper length for sexual maturity first. Females contain ova-producing follicles and two genital apertures, but no vagina.
