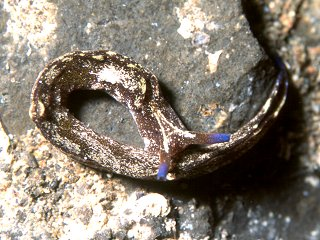

Scientific classification
- Kingdom: Animalia
- Phylum: Mollusca
- Class: Gastropoda
- Superorder: Sacoglossa
- Family: Plakobranchidae
- Genus: Elysia
- Species: E. amakusana

Binomial name
- Elysia amakusana Baba, 1955

= Elysia amakusana =

Species of gastropod

Elysia amakusana is a species of sea slug, a marine gastropod mollusc in the family Plakobranchidae.

== Distribution ==
This marine species is endemic to Australia and occurs off eastern Australia.

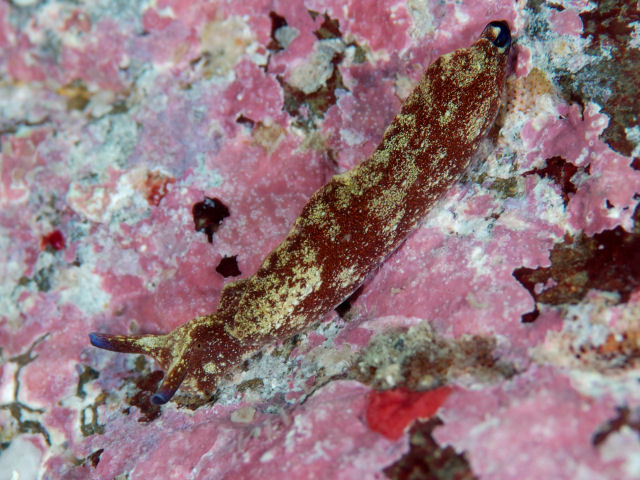
Elysia amakusana
