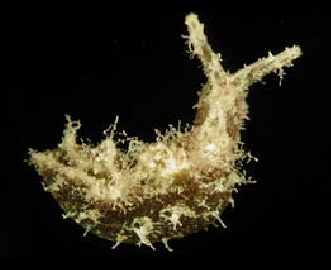
- Elysia tomentosa about 1.5 cm in length

Scientific classification
- Kingdom: Animalia
- Phylum: Mollusca
- Class: Gastropoda
- Superorder: Sacoglossa
- Family: Plakobranchidae
- Genus: Elysia
- Species: E. tomentosa

Binomial name
- Elysia tomentosa Jensen, 1997

= Elysia tomentosa =

Species of gastropod

Elysia tomentosa is a species of sacoglossan sea slug, a shell-less marine opisthobranch gastropod mollusk in the family Plakobranchidae.

== Distribution ==
Type locality is Abrolhos Islands.
