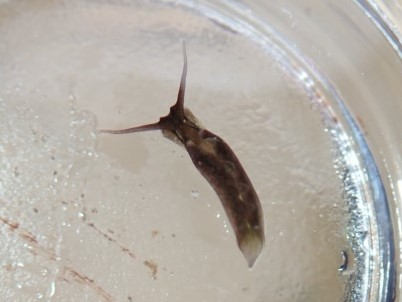

Scientific classification
- Kingdom: Animalia
- Phylum: Mollusca
- Class: Gastropoda
- Superorder: Sacoglossa
- Family: Plakobranchidae
- Genus: Elysia
- Species: E. australis

Binomial name
- Elysia australis (Quoy & Gaimard, 1832)

Synonyms
- Actaeon australis Quoy & Gaimard, 1832

= Elysia australis =

Species of gastropod

Elysia australis is a species of sea slug, a marine gastropod mollusc in the family Plakobranchidae. This sea slug resembles a nudibranch, but it is not closely related to that order of gastropods, instead it is a sacoglossan. It occurs in Australia.

== Description ==
Elysia australis has a slim, slug-like appearance and can grow to a length of 25 millimetres (0.98 in) but 12 millimetres (0.47 in) is a more normal size. In colour it is varying shades of green with splotches of white, sometimes with black speckles. The parapodia are edged with a narrow black line and the tail tip is black. The rhinophores are also dark and there is a distinctive black T-shaped mark in front of and between them. Elysia australis is not easy to observe because its colour derives from the chloroplasts of the algae it has eaten so its hue matches its background.

== Distribution ==
Elysia australis is found around the coasts of Australia, grazing on small algae on intertidal rock platforms and in shallow pools.
