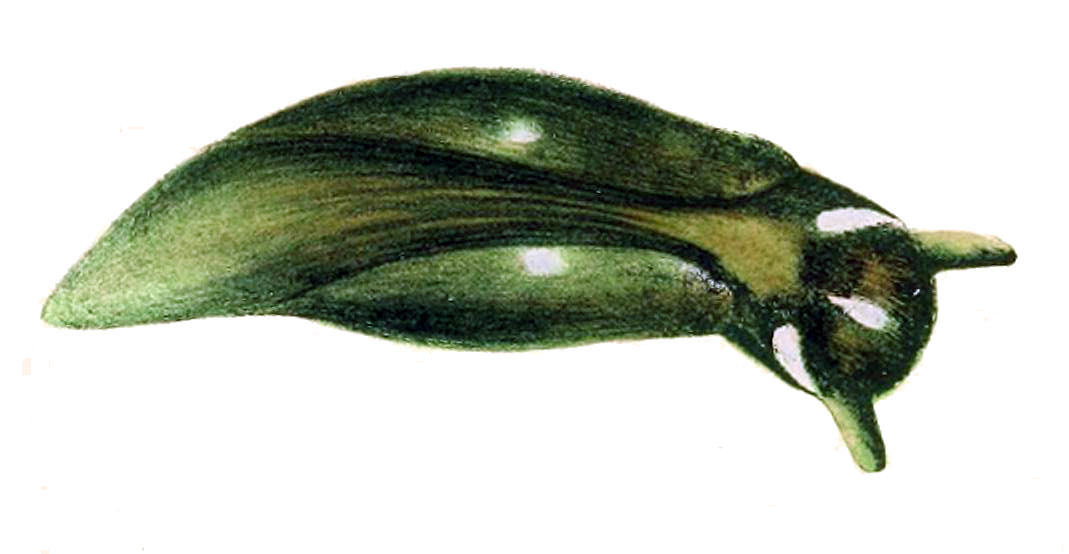

Scientific classification
- Kingdom: Animalia
- Phylum: Mollusca
- Class: Gastropoda
- Superorder: Sacoglossa
- Family: Plakobranchidae
- Genus: Elysia
- Species: E. catulus

Binomial name
- Elysia catulus (Gould, 1870)

= Elysia catulus =

Species of gastropod

Elysia catulus is a small species of sea slug, a marine gastropod mollusc in the family Plakobranchidae. This sea slug resembles a nudibranch, but it is not closely related to that order of gastropods, instead it is a sacoglossan. The specific name "catulus" comes from the Greek and means "little cat", referring to the superficial resemblance that the head of this slug bears to the head of a cat.

== Description ==
Elysia catulus grows to about 6 millimetres (0.24 in) in length. The body is mainly black but this is tinged with green as the gut contents can be seen through the skin. There are three white streaks on the head, one central and the other two running diagonally past the eye. There are also two or three white patches on the parapodia, the fleshy protrusions on either side of the body.

== Distribution ==
Elysia catulus feeds on the seagrass Zostera and is found in seagrass meadows on the eastern seaboard of North America from Nova Scotia south to South Carolina.

== Biology ==
Elysia catulus has a short life cycle, living for less than a year. Spawning takes place in June and July and the adults die soon afterwards. The larvae that hatch from the eggs form part of the zooplankton and disperse widely. After settling, the juveniles grow rapidly. This may be linked to the fact that they develop cerata (hornlike outgrowths). These provide an increase in digestive and respiratory surface area which allows increased rates of metabolism and consequently growth. There are considerable fluctuations in population size and a sudden increase may be due to the arrival of larvae that have originated elsewhere. Juveniles are found in the safety of the inrolled margins of the Zostera leaf whereas adults feed on the flat leaf blades. Feeding is done by puncturing the plant's tissue with the radular tooth and sucking out the cell sap.
