= Elysia ornata =

Scientific classification
- Kingdom: Animalia
- Phylum: Mollusca
- Class: Gastropoda
- Superorder: Sacoglossa
- Family: Plakobranchidae
- Genus: Elysia
- Species: E. ornata

Binomial name
- Elysia ornata (Swainson, 1840)

Synonyms
- Thallepus ornatus Swainson, 1840

Species of gastropod

Elysia ornata, commonly known as ornate elysia or ornate leaf slug, is a species of sea slug, a marine gastropod mollusk. This sea slug superficially resembles a nudibranch, yet it does not belong to that suborder of gastropods. Instead it is a member of the closely related clade Sacoglossa, the "sap-sucking" sea slugs.

== Description ==
Elysia ornata can grow to about 5 centimetres (2.0 in) in length. It is a translucent greenish-yellow colour speckled with white and black. It has broad parapodia each edged with an orange band and a black margin. The rhinophores are similarly coloured with a band of orange and dark tips. Its main food source is algae and are found on submergent vegetation.

== Distribution ==
Elysia ornata is a tropical species found in the benthic zone at depths of 0–18 m (0–59 ft). It was thought to populate both the Caribbean Sea and the Pacific Ocean, but further analysis revealed that the Pacific populations consisted of several undescribed or previously synonomized species, and thus the type locality of E. ornata was restricted to the Caribbean Sea.
