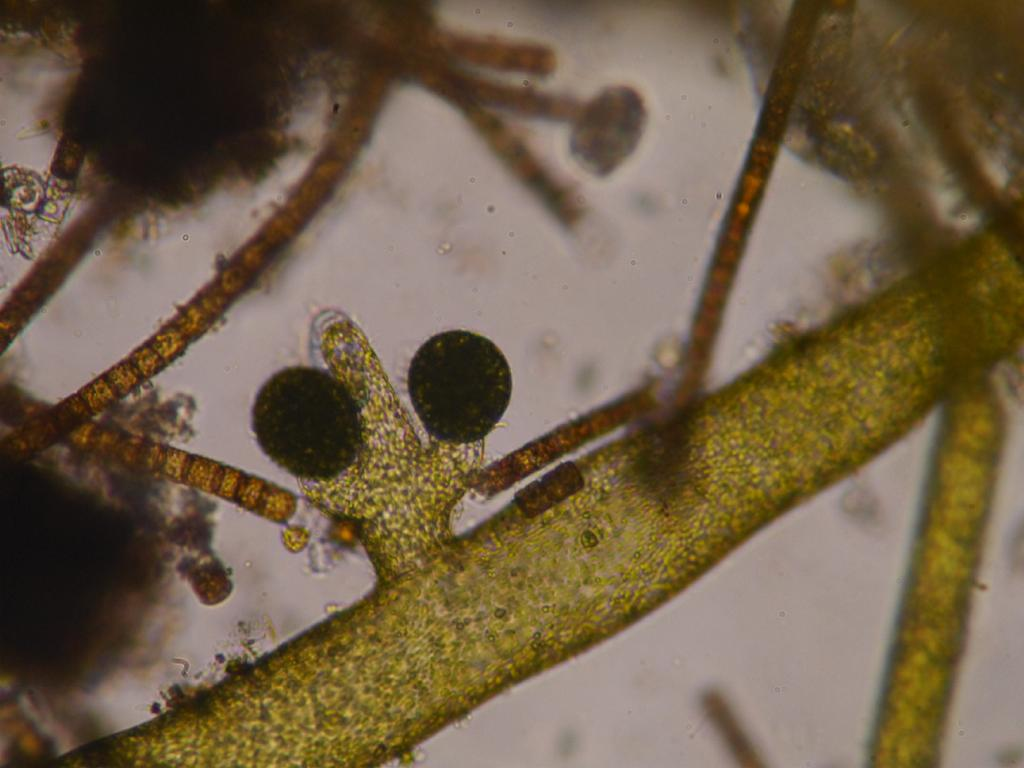

Scientific classification
- Domain: Eukaryota
- Clade: Sar
- Clade: Stramenopiles
- Phylum: Ochrophyta
- Class: Xanthophyceae
- Order: Vaucheriales
- Family: Vaucheriaceae
- Genus: Vaucheria
- Species: V. litorea

Binomial name
- Vaucheria litorea Hofman ex. C.Agardh

= Vaucheria litorea =

Species of alga

Vaucheria litorea is a species of yellow-green algae (Xanthophyceae). It grows in a filamentous fashion (forming long tubular cells connected end to end). V. litorea is a common intertidal species of coastal brackish waters and salt marshes of the Northern Atlantic, along the coasts of Europe, North America and New Zealand. It is also found in the Eastern Pacific coasts of Washington state. It is found to be able to tolerate a large range of salinities, making it euryhaline.

== Taxonomy and nomenclature ==
The species belong to Vaucheria were initially documented within the genus Conferva, at that time consisting of 21 species, when reported by Linnaeus in 1753. Vaucheria litorea have been categorized under Vaucheriaceae. Various historical classifications, found in older literature, situated Vaucheria among water molds and siphonous green algae. The species-level classification of Vaucheria has undergone considerable changes over the past century, involving the assignment of species to subgeneric sections and subsections. Presently, the genus Vaucheria is assigned to section Piloboloideae. The recent taxonomy of the genus relies on a morphological species concept, wherein species are characterized based on morphology, particularly the shape, size, and arrangement of antheridia and oogonia. Identifying closely related species poses challenges due to overlapping characteristics.

== Description ==
V. litorea characterized by siphons with apical growth. The antheridia are cylindrical-acuminate, terminal on siphons, 400–650 μm long, and distributed in frequent sympodial clusters. The dark green, filamentous dioecious algae forms loose interwoven bundles or dense sods, attached to the substrate by branched rhizoids. Filaments are coenocytic, 70–95 μm thick, dichotomously branched, and lack transverse cell membranes. Reproduction is vegetative (fragmentation), asexual (large multinucleate synzoospores), and sexual (fertilization of a non-motile ovule by a motile multiflagellate antherozoid).

Like most algae, V. litorea obtains its energy through photosynthesis taking place in chloroplasts. V. litorea belongs to the Stramenopiles, a group currently housing red algal secondary-derived plastids. The chloroplasts of V. litorea are yellow-green, disc-shaped, small, and lack pyrenoids. Also they contain the photosynthetic pigments Chlorophyll a, Chlorophyll c, β-Carotene, and the carotenoid diadinoxanthin.

=== Plastid genome of V. litorea ===
The V. litorea plastid genome lacks the complete set of components for any of the four multi-subunit complexes of the photosynthetic electron transport chain (including photosystems I (PSI) and II (PSII), cytochrome b6/f complex, and ATP synthase) and the reductive pentose phosphate pathway (RPPP or Calvin–Benson cycle). Essential genes in the thylakoid-localized electron transport chain, such as those encoding the PSI and PSII light-harvesting complex pigment/proteins, the PSII Mn-stabilizing protein, and the redox-regulated γ-subunit of ATP synthase, are notably absent. The plastid-encoded enzyme for RPPP is limited to the carboxylating enzyme ribulose-1,5-bisphosphate carboxylase/oxygenase (RuBisCO). Unlike plants and green algae, both large and small subunits of RuBisCO are plastid-encoded in V. litorea.

== Life history ==
The evolutionary history of Vaucheria indicates that the ancestral form produced antheridia and oogonia as separate structures, possibly adjacent. The presence of a gametophore bearing both an antheridium and an oogonium is considered a derived character state that evolved once in the ancestral Vaucheria. Additionally, the ancestral Vaucheria is inferred to have produced a single terminal pore on the antheridium, with multiple pores evolving independently on two occasions. The dioecious condition of Piloboloideae is suggested to be a derived state, and the presence of a gametophore distinguishes a monophyletic clade (sections Vaucheria, Corniculatae).

== Ecology ==
V. littorea is recognized as a photobiont (photosynthetic symbiont). Vaucheria litorea are consumed by the sea slug Elysia chlorotica, but are only partially digested by them in order to retain the photosynthetic chloroplasts in a process called kleptoplasty (plastid retention). The sea slug feeds on V. litorea and V. compacta, retaining the chloroplasts in storage in cells along the slug's digestive tract. The chloroplasts continue to photosynthesize, providing energy to the slug, and contribute to the unusual coloration of the sea slug by their distribution throughout the extensively branched gut. The transmission of photosynthetic symbionts primarily occurs horizontally, with each generation of sea slug acquiring its photosynthetic partner anew from the surrounding environment. This association is not only specific but also obligate, as the sea slug cannot complete metamorphosis and mature into an adult without its algal prey and plastid uptake. The transmission to the germline represents a critical barrier for establishing a more permanent photosynthetic association in animals. Specific recognition processes in the sea slug involve larvae requiring V. litorea filaments for settlement and metamorphosis, while adult development necessitates the uptake and retention of V. litorea plastids by cells in the digestive diverticula.

Due to the secondary evolution of plastids, V. litorea's plastids are surrounded by four membranes. However, the outer two membranes are not readily observed in the sea slug. Only the plastids, referred to as kleptoplasts. It was hypothesize that the evolution of kleptoplasty and photosynthesis in the sea slug parallels other tertiary-evolved photosynthetic organisms, involving endosymbiosis and potential horizontal gene transfer (HGT). Kleptoplast activity in E. chlorotica remains evident even after months (up to ten months) of being starved of algal prey, indicating the presence of essential photosynthetic proteins. The decline in metabolic activity corresponds with aging, but photosystem I activity of kleptoplast thylakoids remains high for an extended period. The long-term functioning of V. litorea plastids in E. chlorotica is intriguing, given the absence of algal nuclei in the sea slug. Plastid proteins, typically encoded by both the algal plastid and nuclear genomes, are crucial for photosynthesis, and the robustness of the plastids themselves likely contributes to their survival in the symbiosis.

The plastid-encoded phosphoribulokinase (PRK) in V. litorea catalyzes the irreversible reaction generating the substrate ribulose-1,5-bisphosphate (RuBP) for Rubisco-dependent CO_{2} fixation supporting the Calvin cycle. To maintain the enzyme's activity, the PRK pre-protein must be de novo synthesized and imported from the cytosol. PRK is of interest due to its complex regulatory properties, with regulation characterized in only a few Stramenopiles, including diatoms and a raphidophyte. Dark inactivation of the Calvin cycle and PRK in V. litorea plastids is hypothesized to prevent futile cycling and support fatty acid biosynthesis and other carbon substrate synthesis. The long-term viability of the symbiotic association between V. litorea and E. chlorotica necessitates the acquisition of a prk gene that is thought to be through HGT. However, it was shown that there are no signs of HGT between V. litorea and E. chlorotica. The unique positions of three out of four introns in the V. litorea prk gene, with the third intron at a homologous position as a conserved intron in green algae and haptophytes, provide additional evidence for the green algal origin of this gene in V. litorea and other chromalveolates.
