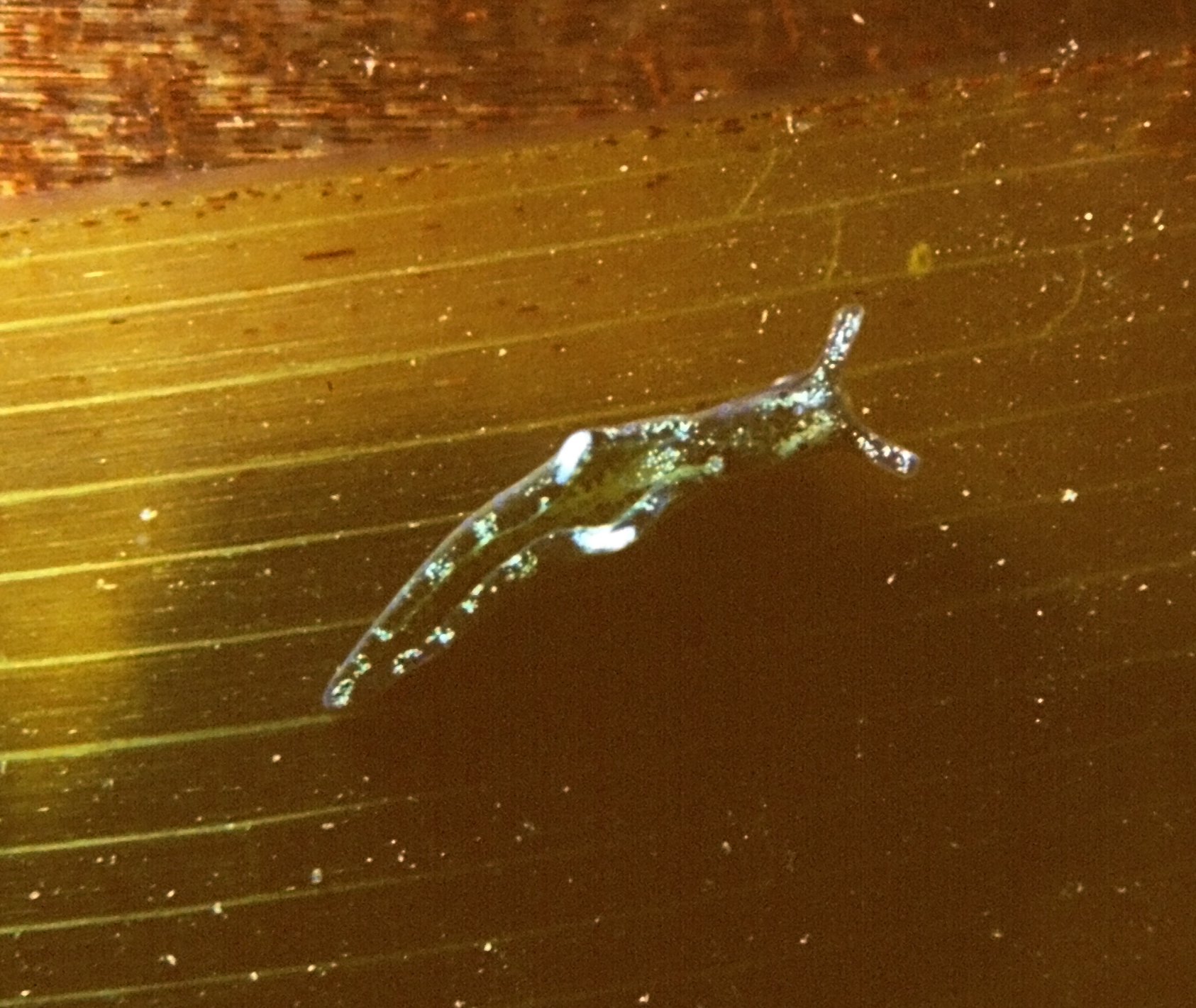

Scientific classification
- Kingdom: Animalia
- Phylum: Mollusca
- Class: Gastropoda
- Superorder: Sacoglossa
- Family: Plakobranchidae
- Genus: Elysia
- Species: E. margaritae

Binomial name
- Elysia margaritae Fez, 1962

Synonyms
- Elysia gordanae Thompson & Jaklin, 1988

= Elysia margaritae =

Species of gastropod

Elysia margaritae is a species of sea slug, a marine gastropod mollusc.

This sea slug resembles a nudibranch, but it is not closely related to that order of gastropods. It is instead a sacoglossan. It is known from the Mediterranean Sea and Adriatic Sea.

== Description ==
Elysia margaritae grows to about 17 millimetres (0.67 in) long. The colour is dappled yellowish-green and fawn with fine red speckles, especially on the pinkish parts of the head, the parapodia and rhinophores. The parapodia are edged with dark green and small white thickened areas. The egg mass is distinctive, the white eggs having orange yolks lying beside their capsules.
