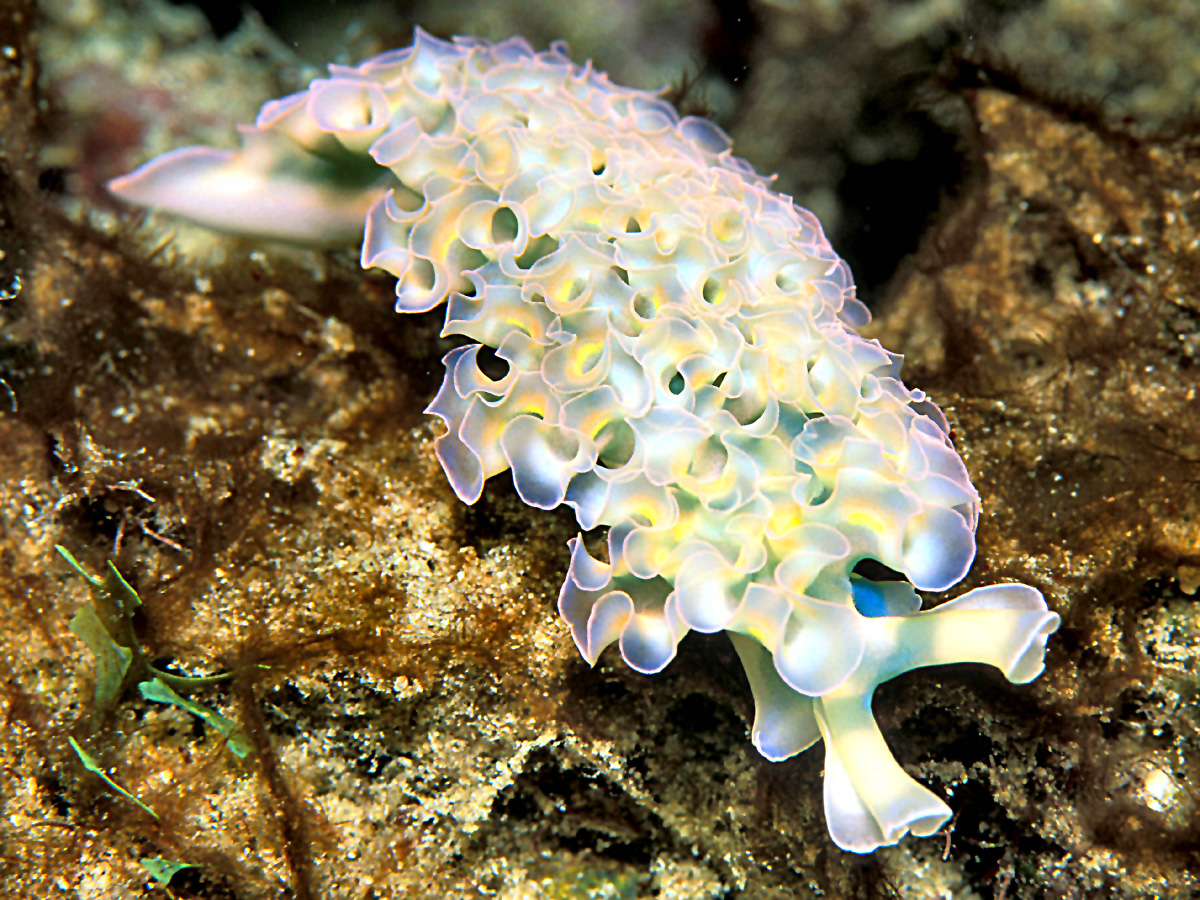
- Elysia crispata in the family Plakobranchidae

Scientific classification
- Domain: Eukaryota
- Kingdom: Animalia
- Phylum: Mollusca
- Class: Gastropoda
- Superorder: Sacoglossa
- Superfamily: Plakobranchoidea; Gray, 1840

Families
- See text

Synonyms
- Limapontioidea Gray, 1847; Placobranchacea; Plakobranchacea

= Plakobranchoidea =

Superfamily of gastropods

Plakobranchoidea is a taxonomic superfamily of sea slugs, marine gastropod mollusks within the superorder Sacoglossa.

== Families ==
Families within the superfamily Plakobranchoidea include:

- Costasiellidae K. B. Clark, 1984
- Hermaeidae H. Adams & A. Adams, 1854
- Limapontiidae Gray, 1847
- Plakobranchidae Gray, 1840
- Platyhedylidae Salvini-Plawen, 1973: belongs to the superfamily Platyhedyloidea

Synonyms

- Actaeonidae : synonym of Plakobranchidae
- Alderiidae : synonym of Limapontiidae
- Boselliidae Ev. Marcus, 1982 : synonym of Plakobranchidae Gray, 1840
- Caliphyllidae Tiberi, 1881: synonym of Hermaeidae H. Adams & A. Adams, 1854
- Elysiidae: synonym of Plakobranchidae
- Ercolaniinae : synonym of Limapontiidae
- Jenseneriidae Ortea & Moro, 2015: synonym of Caliphyllidae Tiberi, 1881 accepted as Hermaeidae H. Adams & A. Adams, 1854
- Gascoignellidae :synonym of Platyhedylidae
- Lobiferidae : synonym of Caliphyllidae
- Oleidae : synonym of Limapontiidae
- Phyllobranchidae : synonym of Caliphyllidae
- Phyllobranchillidae : synonym of Caliphyllidae
- Placobranchidae: synonym of Plakobranchidae
- Polybranchiidae : synonym of Caliphyllidae
- Pontolimacidae : synonym of Limapontiidae
- Stiligeridae : synonym of Limapontiidae
