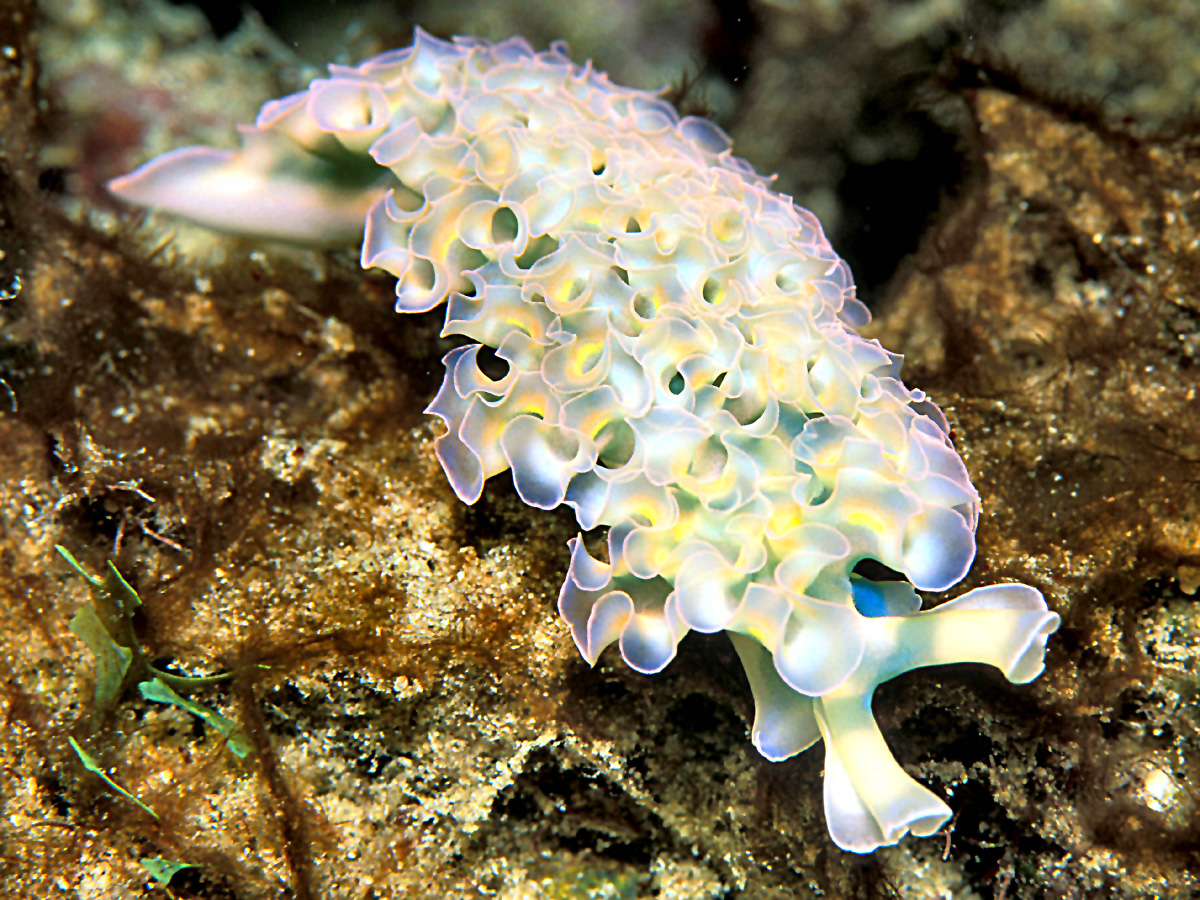
- A live individual of the lettuce sea slug in situ, head end towards the lower right

Conservation status
- Vulnerable (NatureServe)

Scientific classification
- Kingdom: Animalia
- Phylum: Mollusca
- Class: Gastropoda
- Superorder: Sacoglossa
- Family: Plakobranchidae
- Genus: Elysia
- Species: E. crispata

Binomial name
- Elysia crispata (Mörch, 1863)

Synonyms
- List: Elysia (Tridachia) crispata Mörch, 1863; Elysia clarki Pierce, Curtis, Massey, Bass, Karl & Finney, 2006; Elysia pruvotfolae Er. Marcus, 1957; Elysia schrammi Mörch, 1863; Elysia verrilli Pruvot-Fol, 1946; Tridachia crispata (Mörch, 1863); Tridachia schrammi (Mörch, 1863); Tridachia whiteae Er. Marcus, 1957

= Elysia crispata =

Lettuce sea slug

Species of gastropod

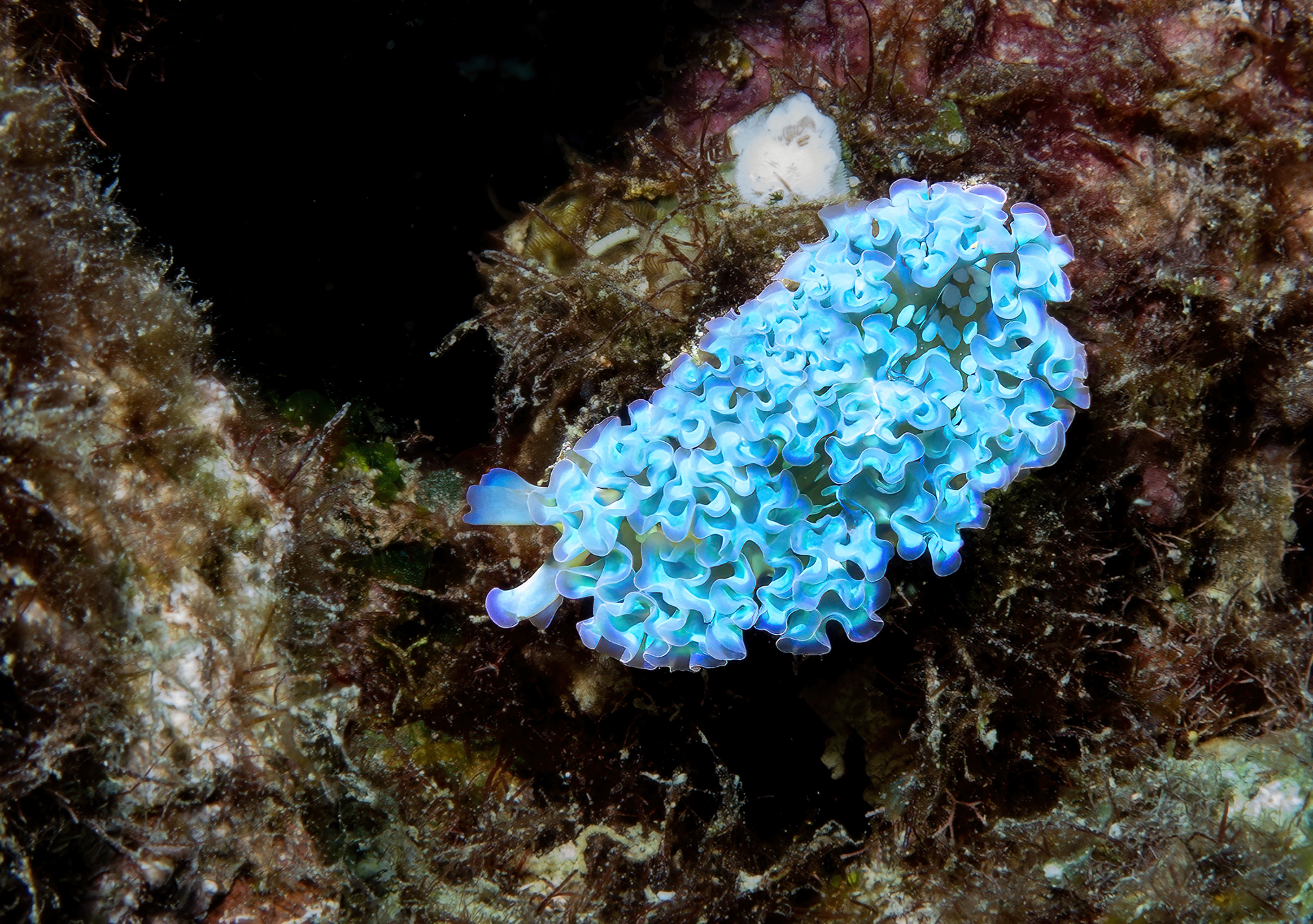
A blue lettuce sea slug. Westpunt, Curacao.

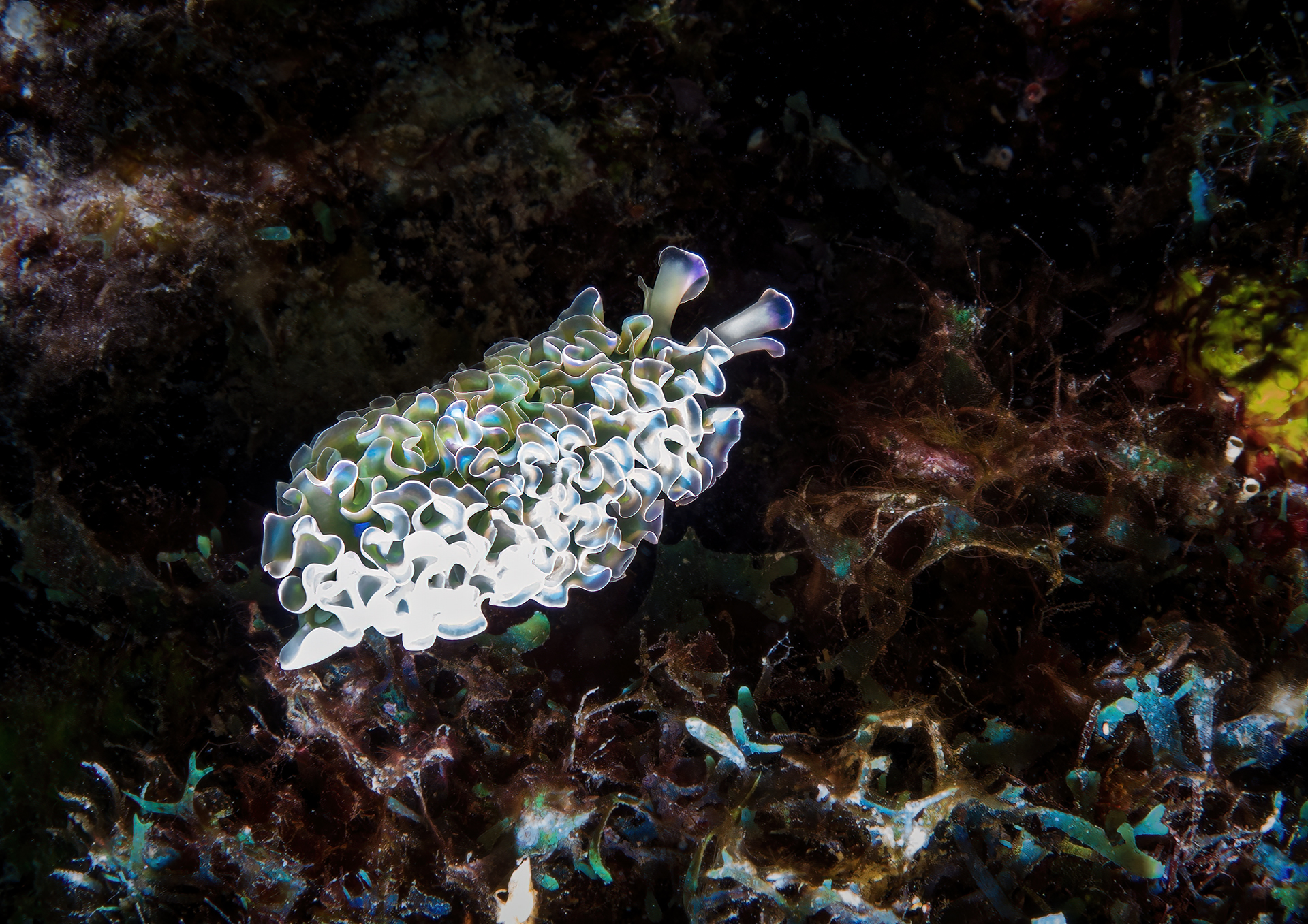
A white and blue lettuce sea slug. Westpunt, Curacao.

Elysia crispata, common name the lettuce sea slug or lettuce slug, is a large and colorful species of sea slug, a marine gastropod mollusk.

The lettuce slug resembles a nudibranch, but it is not closely related to that clade of gastropods; it is classified as a sacoglossan.

== Description ==
This species is called the lettuce slug because it is often green in color, and it always has a very frilly edge to its parapodia. This makes the slug resemble the curly kinds of lettuce, such as the lollo rosso variety. The maximum length of this species is about 5 cm and 3 cm in width.

The lettuce slug is extremely variable in color: it can also be blue, or very pale with red lines or yellow lines.

== Distribution ==
This species lives in the tropical parts of the western Atlantic, and the Caribbean faunal zone. They are found in more coastal and tropical reef areas where the water is shallow and clear.

== Diet ==
E. crispata can be either heterotrophic or autotrophic throughout their lifespan. As juveniles, food is consumed and digested quickly, with little chloroplast retention. Upon reaching maturity, kleptoplasty becomes an important energy source. The primary food source of E. crispata is relatively unknown, although some individuals have been known to consume a diversity of algal species such as Vaucheria litorea, Caulerpa verticillata, Caulerpa racemosa, Halimeda discoidea, Halimeda incrassate, Halimeda monile, and Penicillus capitatus; C. verticillata being suitable for a limited amount of time. This diversity in food sources is a different characteristic compared to other Sacoglossans which are specialized for one species of algae, and gives E. crispata a survival advantage when food is depleted or sparse. Chloroplasts within their parapodia (fleshy dorsal protrusions) continue to produce energy products through carbon fixation throughout their life and have been found to function efficiently for a little over a month.

=== Kleptoplasty ===
Also known as chloroplast symbiosis, kleptoplasty is the energy-providing mechanism that gives the Sacoglossan's the nickname, "solar-powered sea slugs", and E. crispata the name, "lettuce sea slug." As algal food is being digested, the chloroplasts are absorbed into the cells lining the digestive tract and up into their parapodia. How many chloroplasts the slug sequesters and the length of retention depends on the individual species of slug. Chloroplast retention in E. crispata tends to last around 40 days. Given the variation in their diet, chloroplasts from different algal species have been found to be taken up into the same cells, functioning normally alongside the other.

E. crispata is closely related to E. chlorotica, both having a long-term chloroplast retention ability, where other species within the same genus tend to have more short-term retention. This ability makes it possible to withstand long periods of time without food. In the absence of food, E. crispata will invest energy trying to find food rather than slowing down and conserving energy. Although it hasn't been exclusively studied for this organism, one possibility of the mechanism behind long-term retention is due to the amount of extracellular components which prolong chloroplast activity, depending on the species of algae eaten. As E. crispata continues to consume food, the chloroplasts ingested will continuously replace older chloroplasts while food is available. Their long-term retention is an evolutionary adaption which allows a greater chance of survival during drastic environmental changes.

== Reproduction ==
Very little is known of the mating behaviors of E. crispata. Typically the egg mass is laid on flat, upright algae, and embryo development takes about 15 days. Eggs are very small, between 106–113 micrometres, and eggs vary in average size by location.

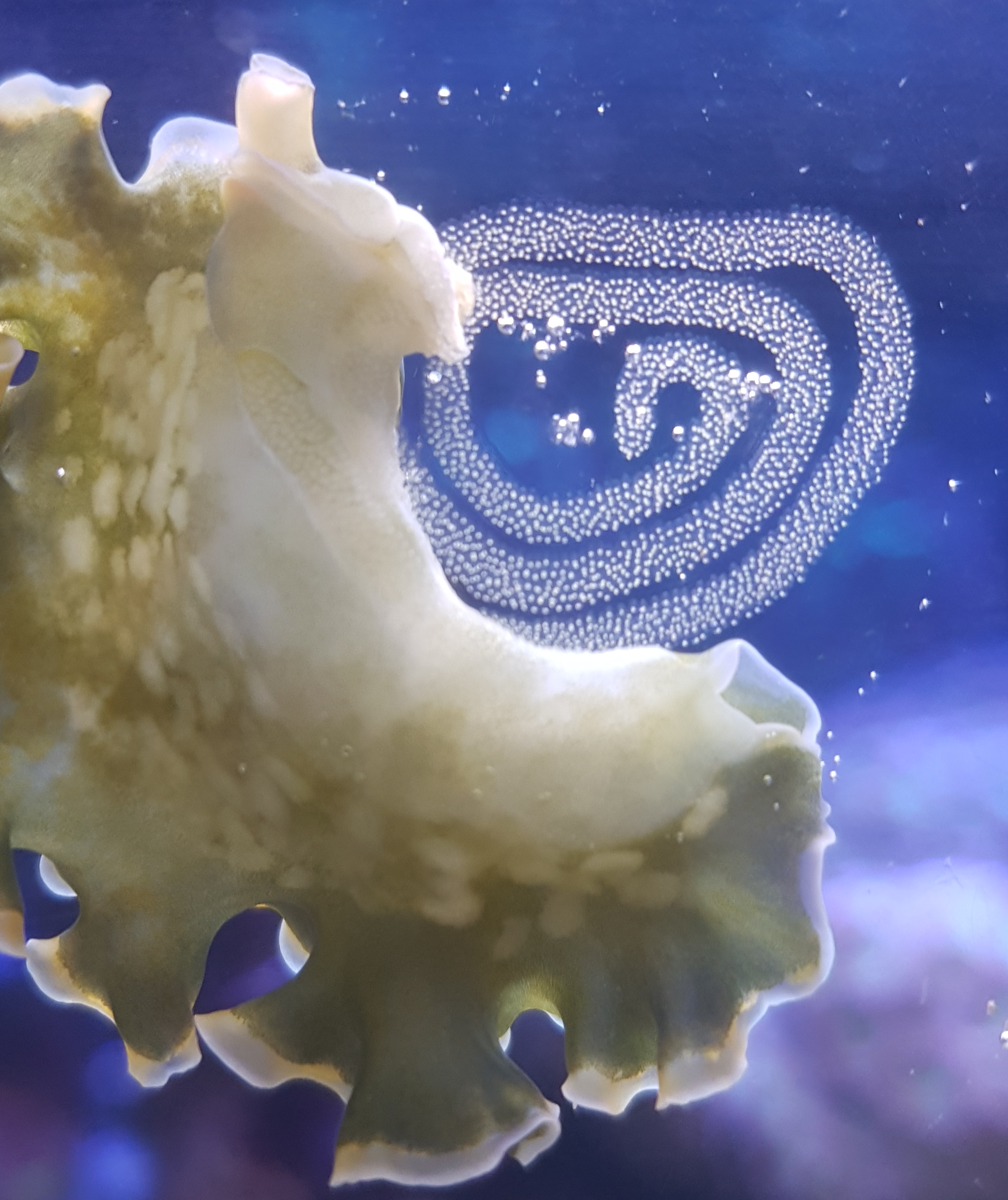
Elysia crispata eggs on an aquarium pane.

Newly hatched E. crispata demonstrate a dispersal dimorphism, not to be confused with poecilogony. Babies can either undergo intracapsular metamorphosis, or post-hatching metamorphosis, giving E. crispata variation in their dispersal strategy. This allows some clutches to remain stationary to that habitat, or allowing them to swim to a new habitat before metamorphosing. Some species of Sacoglossan such as Elysia tuca, invest extra energy to create extra-cellular yolk which is weaved into their egg mass, providing a greater abundance of nutrients for larval growth, which in turn produces larger progeny. E. crispata, however, does not produce extra-cellular yolk, which affects the size of the eggs.
