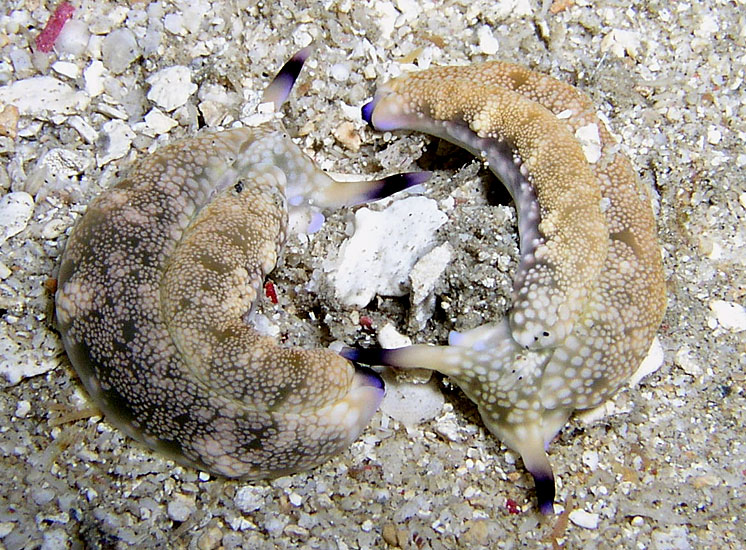
- Two Plakobranchus ocellatus seaslugs

Scientific classification
- Kingdom: Animalia
- Phylum: Mollusca
- Class: Gastropoda
- Superorder: Sacoglossa
- Family: Plakobranchidae
- Genus: Plakobranchus van Hasselt, 1824

Synonyms
- Placobranchus Hasselt, 1824

= Plakobranchus =

Genus of gastropods

Plakobranchus is a genus of sea slugs, sacoglossans, marine opisthobranch gastropod mollusks in the family Plakobranchidae.

The author of the genus spelled the name originally as Plakobranchus, but the spelling Placobranchus was a long time the prevailing usage, based on an incorrect subsequent spelling by Férussac (1824) in a translation of van Hasselt's work.

== Species ==
Species within the genus Plakobranchus include:

- Plakobranchus noctisstellatus Mehrotra, Caballer, C.M. Scott, Arnold, Monchanin & Chavanich, 2020
- Plakobranchus ocellatus van Hasselt, 1824
- Plakobranchus papua Meyers-Muñoz & van der Velde, 2016

Recent work on the photosynthetic abilities of Plakobranchus reveals that P. ocellatus is actually a species complex.

Synonyms

- Plakobranchus argus Bergh, 1872: synonym of Plakobranchus ocellatus van Hasselt, 1824
- Plakobranchus camiguinus Bergh, 1872: synonym of Plakobranchus ocellatus van Hasselt, 1824
- Plakobranchus chlorophacus Bergh, 1873: synonym of Plakobranchus ocellatus van Hasselt, 1824
- Plakobranchus guttatus Stimpson, 1855: synonym of Plakobranchus ocellatus van Hasselt, 1824
- Plakobranchus ianthobaptus Gould, 1852: synonym of Plakobranchus ocellatus van Hasselt, 1824
- Plakobranchus laetus Bergh, 1872: synonym of Plakobranchus ocellatus van Hasselt, 1824
- Plakobranchus moebii Bergh, 1888: synonym of Thuridilla moebii (Bergh, 1888) (original combination)
- Plakobranchus priapinus Bergh, 1872: synonym of Plakobranchus ocellatus van Hasselt, 1824
- Plakobranchus punctulatus Bergh, 1872: synonym of Plakobranchus ocellatus van Hasselt, 1824
- Plakobranchus virgata Bergh, 1888: synonym of Thuridilla virgata (Bergh, 1888) (original combination)
