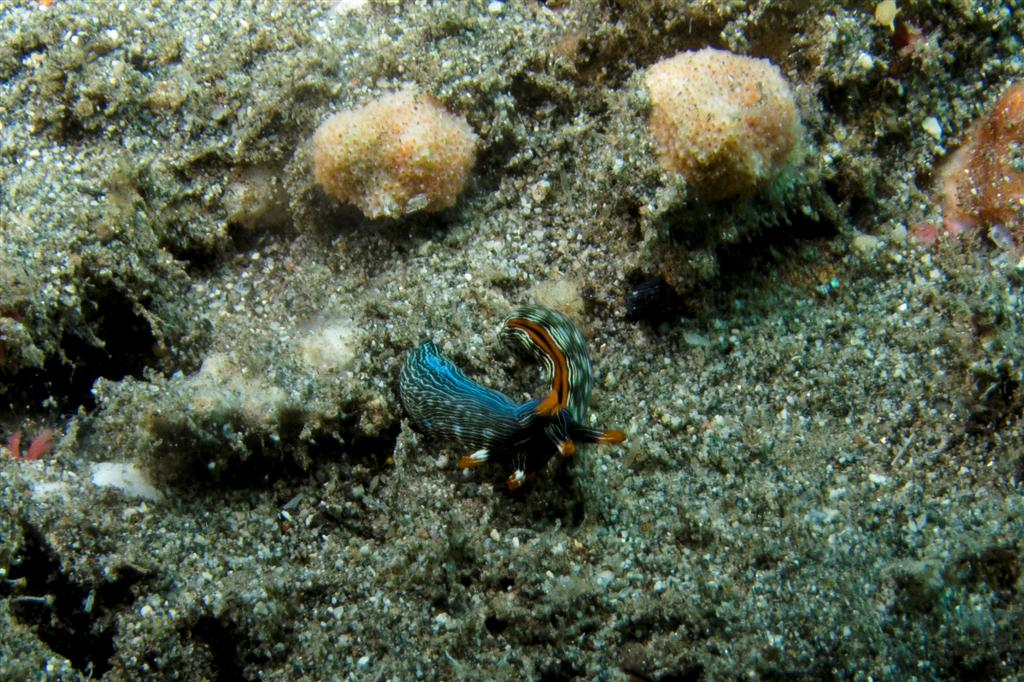

Scientific classification
- Kingdom: Animalia
- Phylum: Mollusca
- Class: Gastropoda
- Family: Plakobranchidae
- Genus: Thuridilla
- Species: T. gracilis

Binomial name
- Thuridilla gracilis (Jean Risbec, 1928)

= Thuridilla gracilis =

Species of gastropod

Thuridilla gracilis is a species of sea slug, a sacoglossan, a marine gastropod mollusk in the family Plakobranchidae. It is an Indo-Pacific species that lives in or near coral reefs and eats algae.

== Distribution and habitat ==
This species occurs in the Tropical Indo/West-Pacific. It lives on the external slope of coral reefs, on top of the reef and in the lagoon, usually in shallow water.

== Description ==
This species can be up to 25 mm in size. The body is partially covered by the fold of the lateral parapodia. The mantle is black and crossed by multiple fine white longitudinal lines (eight to ten) punctuated sometimes with blue spots. The border of the lapel of the parapodia and rhinophores is often orange. The smooth rhinophores can be whitish without any lines.

== Biology ==
This species is benthic and diurnal. Because of its aposematic coloration, it crawls around to feed in the daylight. It has a diet based on algae.
