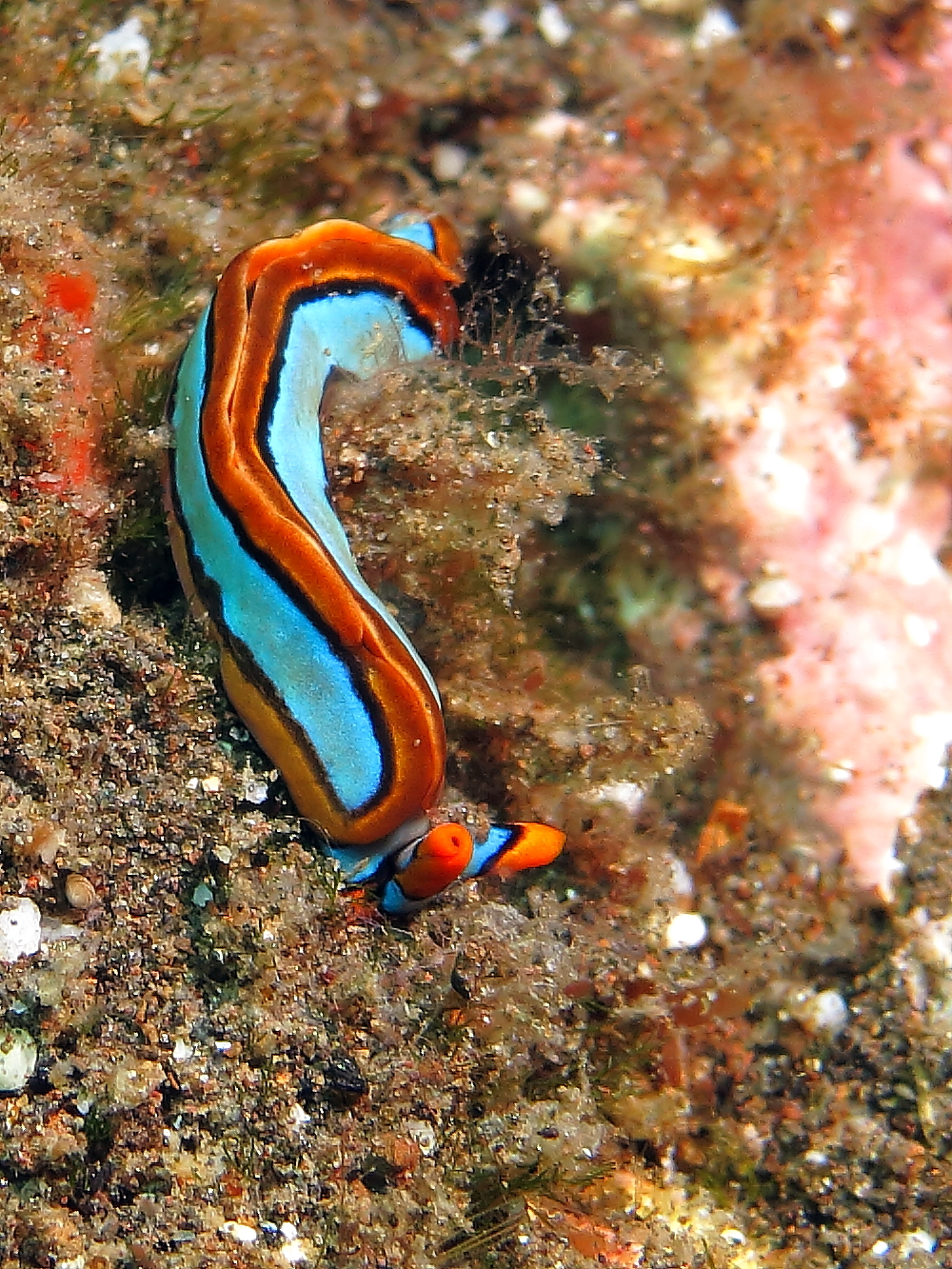

Scientific classification
- Kingdom: Animalia
- Phylum: Mollusca
- Class: Gastropoda
- Family: Plakobranchidae
- Genus: Thuridilla
- Species: T. lineolata

Binomial name
- Thuridilla lineolata (Bergh, 1905)

= Thuridilla lineolata =

Species of gastropod

Thuridilla lineolata is a species of sea slug, a sacoglossan, a marine gastropod mollusk in the family Plakobranchidae. It is an Indo-Pacific species that lives in or near coral reefs and eats algae.

== Distribution and habitat ==
This species occurs in the tropical West-Pacific, mainly in Indonesia and the Philippines. It lives on the external slope of coral reefs, on top of the reef, and in the lagoon.

== Description ==
This species can be up to 3 cm in size. The body is partially covered by the fold of the lateral parapodia. The mantle is bright blue, and the edges of the parapodia are framed by two lines: a fine black one and an orange one on the external side.

The smooth rhinophores and the oral cavity are also marked with a black line and with an orange band.

== Biology ==
This species is benthic and diurnal. Because of its aposematic coloration, it crawls around to feed in the daylight. Its diet is based on algae.
