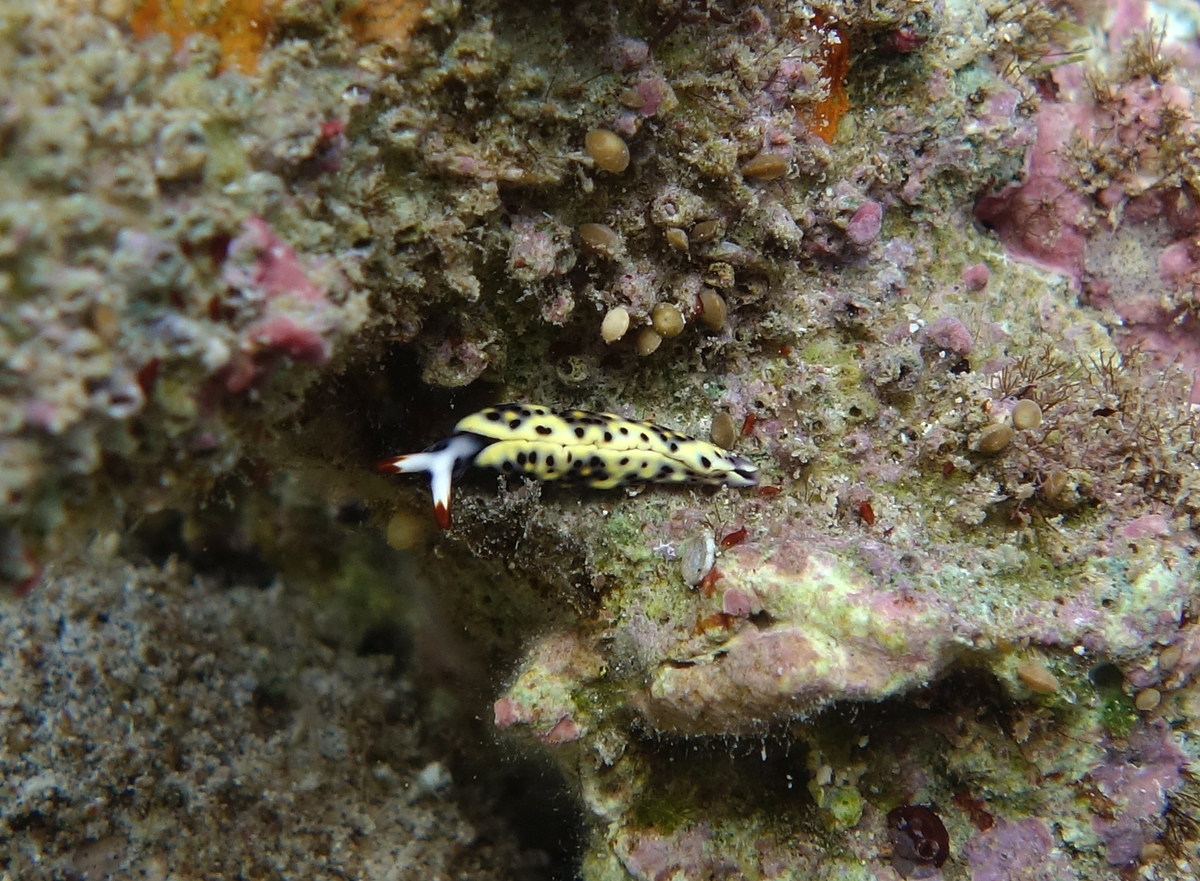

Scientific classification
- Kingdom: Animalia
- Phylum: Mollusca
- Class: Gastropoda
- Family: Plakobranchidae
- Genus: Thuridilla
- Species: T. vataae

Binomial name
- Thuridilla vataae (Risbec, 1928)

= Thuridilla vataae =

Species of sea slug gastropod

Thuridilla vataae is a species of sacoglossan sea slug, a shell-less marine opisthobranch gastropod mollusc in the family Plakobranchidae. It is native to the tropical Indo-Pacific. It was first described by the French zoologist Jean Risbec in 1928; its specific name refers to the Bay of Anse Vata, just south of Nouméa, New Caledonia, where the type specimen was collected.

== Description ==
Thuridilla vataae is a small, slender slug, growing to a maximum length of about 2 cm (0.8 in). The purplish head bears a large white Y-shaped mark on the top which extends forward to the pair of large, coiled rhinophores, which are white, tipped with orange-red. The long parapodia on either side of the body fold over the back so that their undersides are exposed. The colour of these varies somewhat but is usually bluish-violet to dark grey, with raised patches of creamy yellow and black circular spots, and an edging of creamy yellow. The dorsal surface of the body and the upper surface of the parapodia (not normally visible) are purplish, the same colour as the foot, which is divided into two lobes anteriorly.

== Distribution and habitat ==
Thuridilla vataae is found in the tropical and subtropical Indo-Pacific region, its range extending from South Africa to Japan, the Philippines, Northern Australia and Vanuatu. Its habitat is typically shallow water reefs and lagoons.

== Ecology ==
Thuridilla vataae has a saw-edged radula which it uses to cut and rasp the cell walls of the algae on which it feeds. There are 17 to 22 triangular teeth on the radula which are constantly being replaced as they wear down. The discarded teeth fall into a cavity in the mouth where they are stored; this storage sac expands as it fills up with discarded teeth during the course of the sea slug's life.

This sea slug is a simultaneous hermaphrodite. On encountering each other, two individuals pair up, each then passing sperm to the other; fertilisation is internal. Each sea slug later lays a gelatinous string of well-yolked, orange eggs, wound in a concentric spiral. The veliger larvae which hatch out from this, in about five days, are probably planktonic for a while before settling on the seabed and undergoing metamorphosis into juveniles.

In colouring, Thuridilla vataae closely resembles the nudibranchs Hypselodoris infucata and Hypselodoris kanga. These nudibranchs feed on sponges, accumulate toxins from their food, and secrete them from glands on the mantle, making them unappetising to predators. Thuridilla vataae probably benefits from its resemblance to the nudibranchs, a case of Batesian mimicry.
