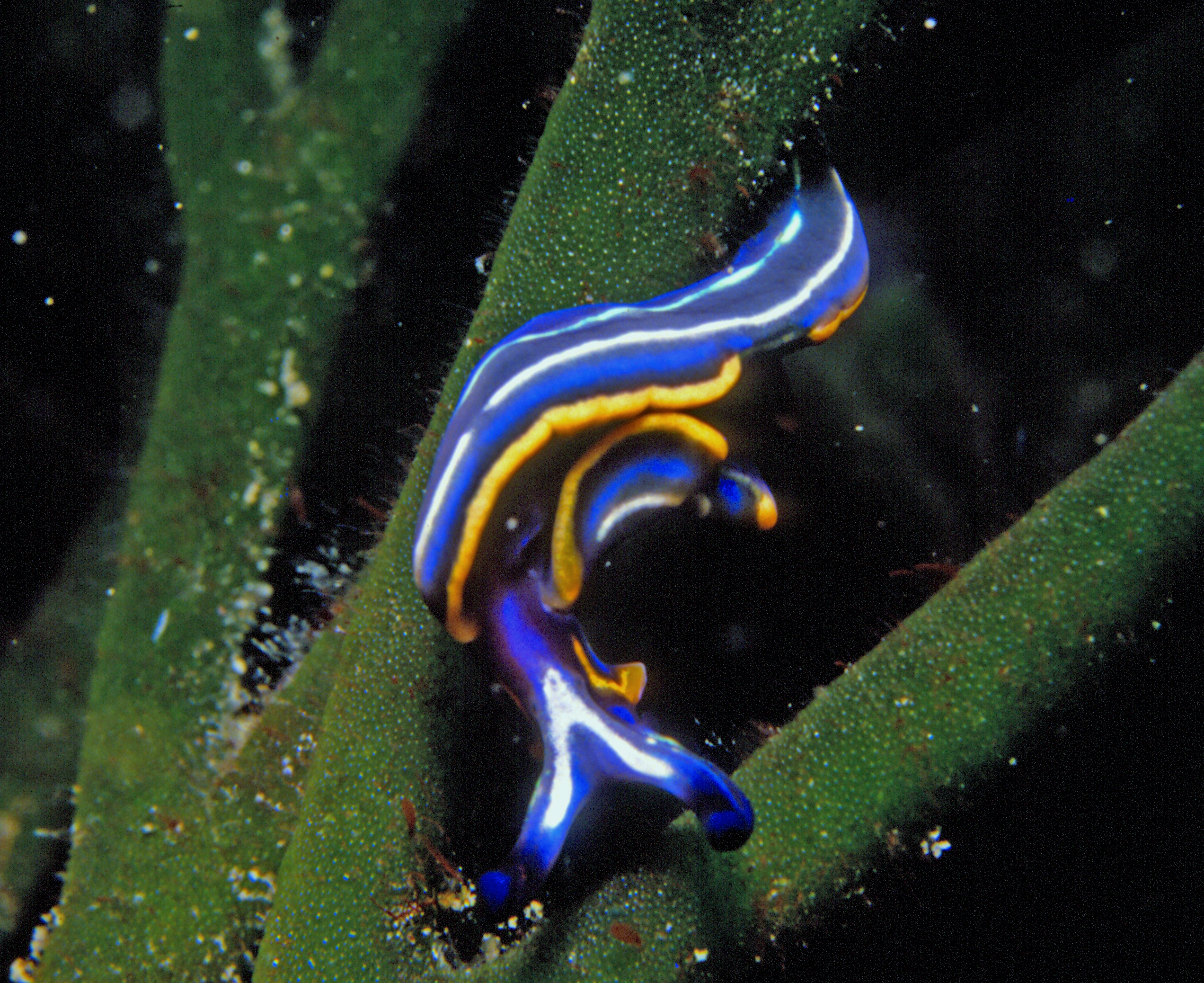
- A live individual of Thuridilla hopei, head end towards the bottom

Scientific classification
- Kingdom: Animalia
- Phylum: Mollusca
- Class: Gastropoda
- Superorder: Sacoglossa
- Superfamily: Plakobranchoidea
- Family: Plakobranchidae
- Genus: Thuridilla; Bergh, 1872

Type species
- Elysia splendida Grube, 1861

= Thuridilla =

Genus of gastropods

Thuridilla is a genus of sacoglossan sea slugs, shell-less marine opisthobranch gastropod mollusks in the family Plakobranchidae.

== Species ==
There are 24 species within the genus Thuridilla:

- Thuridilla albopustulosa Gosliner, 1995
- Thuridilla bayeri (Er. Marcus, 1965)
- Thuridilla carlsoni Gosliner, 1995
- Thuridilla coerulea (Kelaart, 1857)
- Thuridilla decorata (Heller & Thompson, 1983)
- Thuridilla flavomaculata Gosliner, 1995
- Thuridilla gracilis (Risbec, 1928)
- Thuridilla haingsisiana (Bergh, 1905)
- Thuridilla hoffae Gosliner, 1995
- Thuridilla hopei (Vérany, 1853)
- Thuridilla indopacifica Gosliner, 1995
- Thuridilla kathae Gosliner, 1995
- Thuridilla lineolata (Bergh, 1905)
- Thuridilla livida (Baba, 1955)
- Thuridilla malaquita Ortea & Buske, 2014
- Thuridilla mazda Ortea & Espinosa, 2000
- Thuridilla moebii (Bergh, 1888)
- Thuridilla multimarginata Gosliner, 1995
- Thuridilla neona Gosliner, 1995
- Thuridilla picta (A. E. Verrill, 1901)
- Thuridilla ratna (Er. Marcus, 1965)
- Thuridilla splendens (Baba, 1949)
- Thuridilla undula Gosliner, 1995
- Thuridilla vataae (Risbec, 1928)
- Thuridilla virgata (Bergh, 1888)

Synonyms

- Thuridilla thysanopoda (Bergh, 1905): synonym of Elysia thysanopoda Bergh, 1905

== Gallery ==
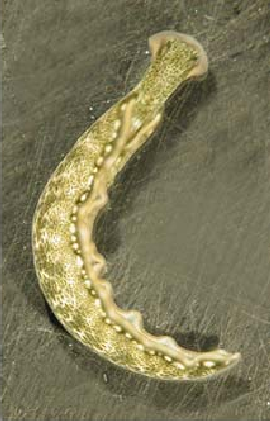
Thuridilla carlsoni

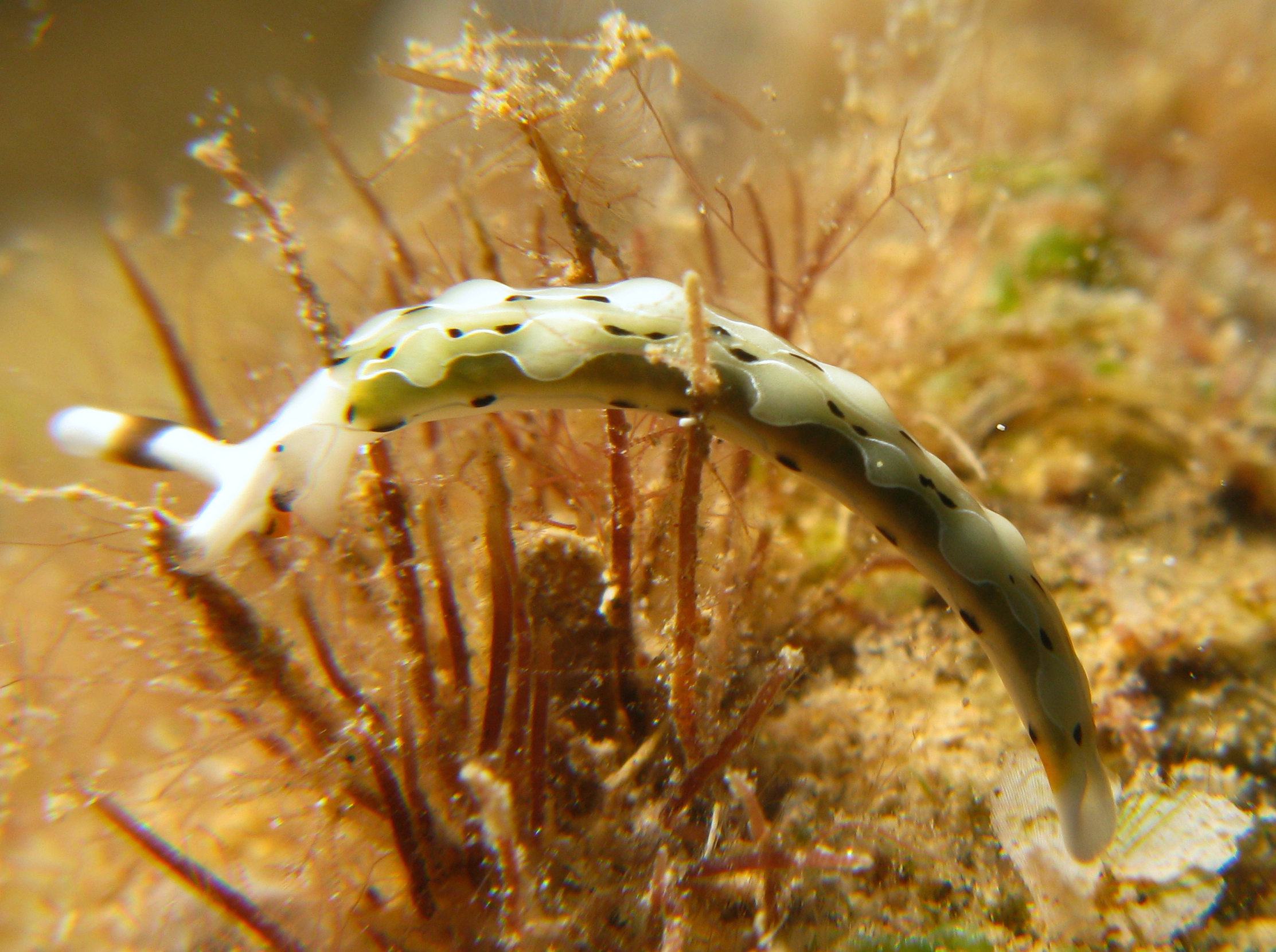
Thuridilla decorata

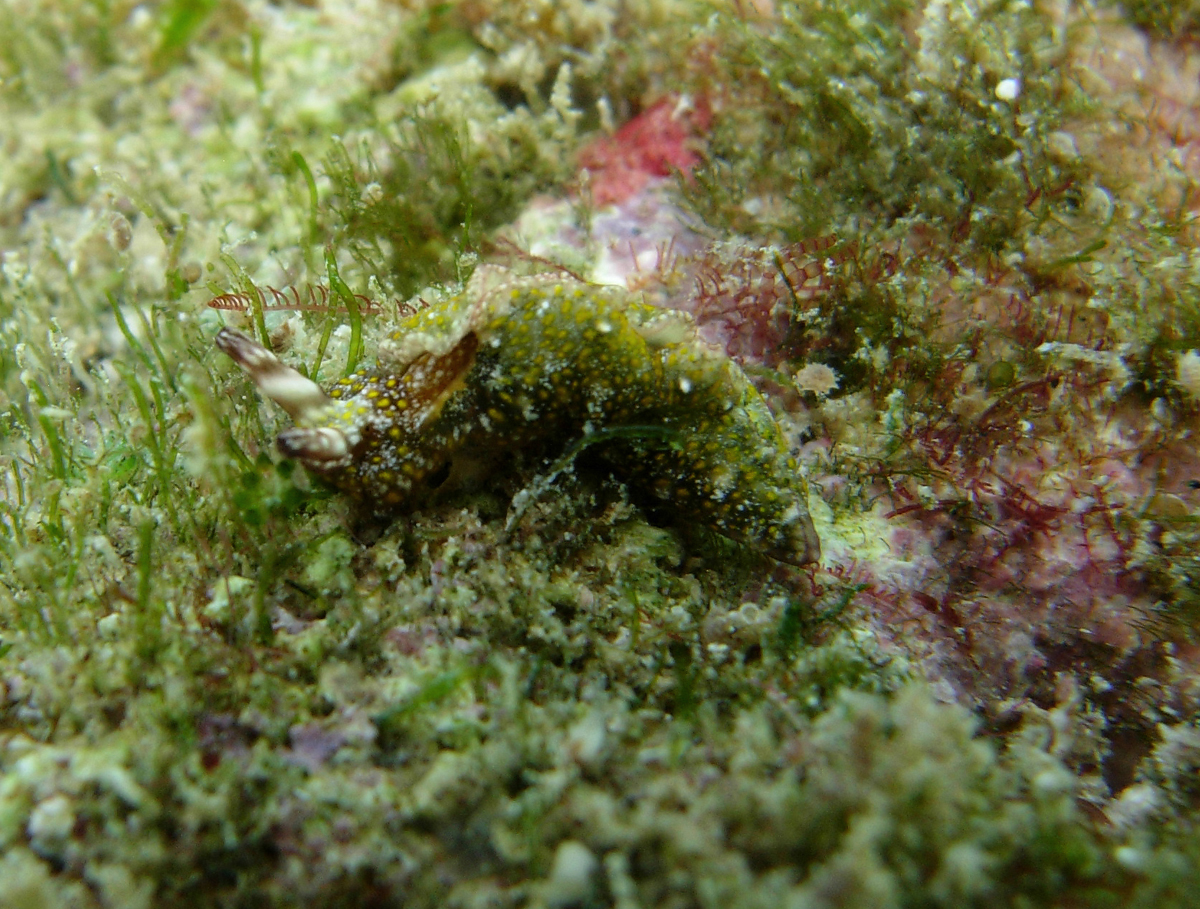
Thuridilla flavomaculata

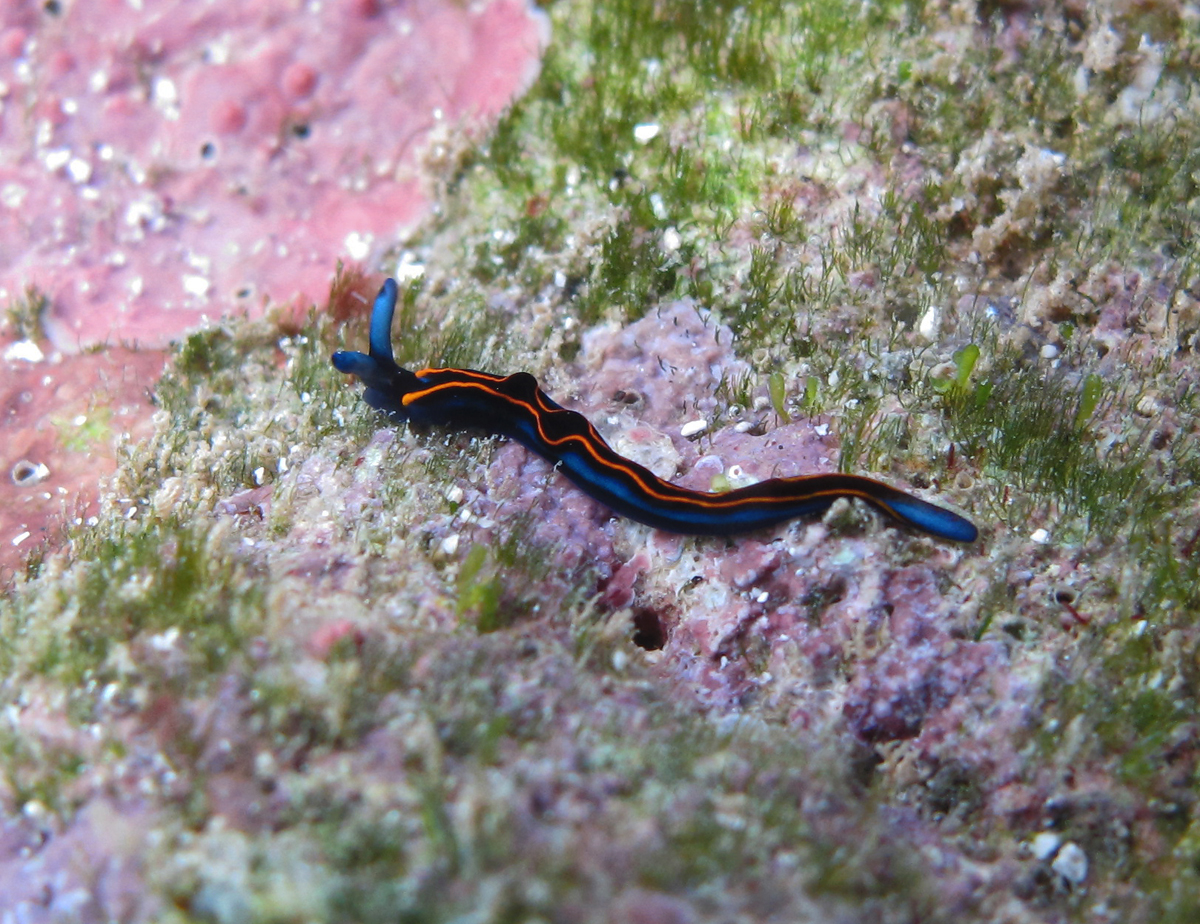
Thuridilla hoffae

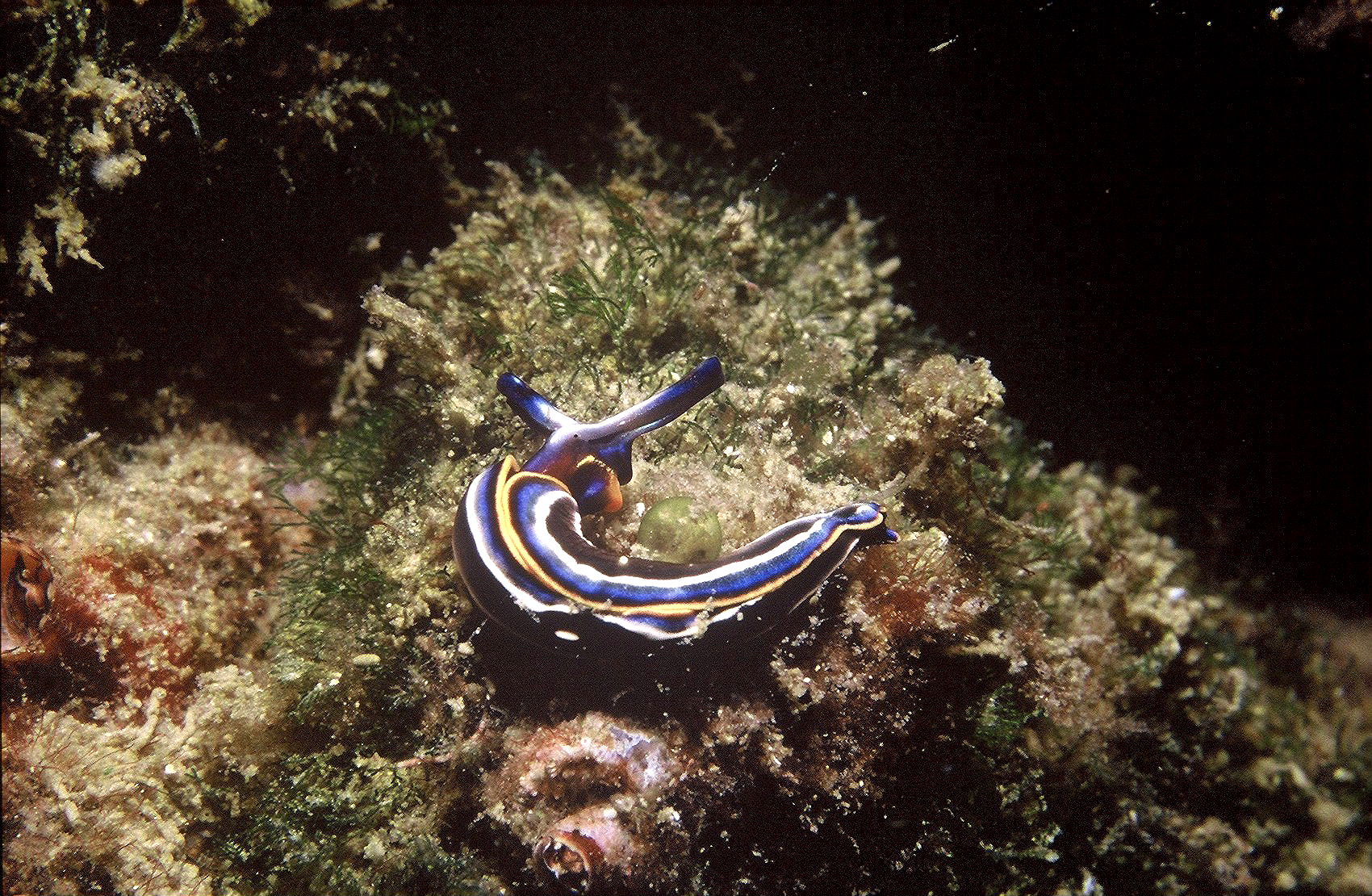
Thuridilla hopei

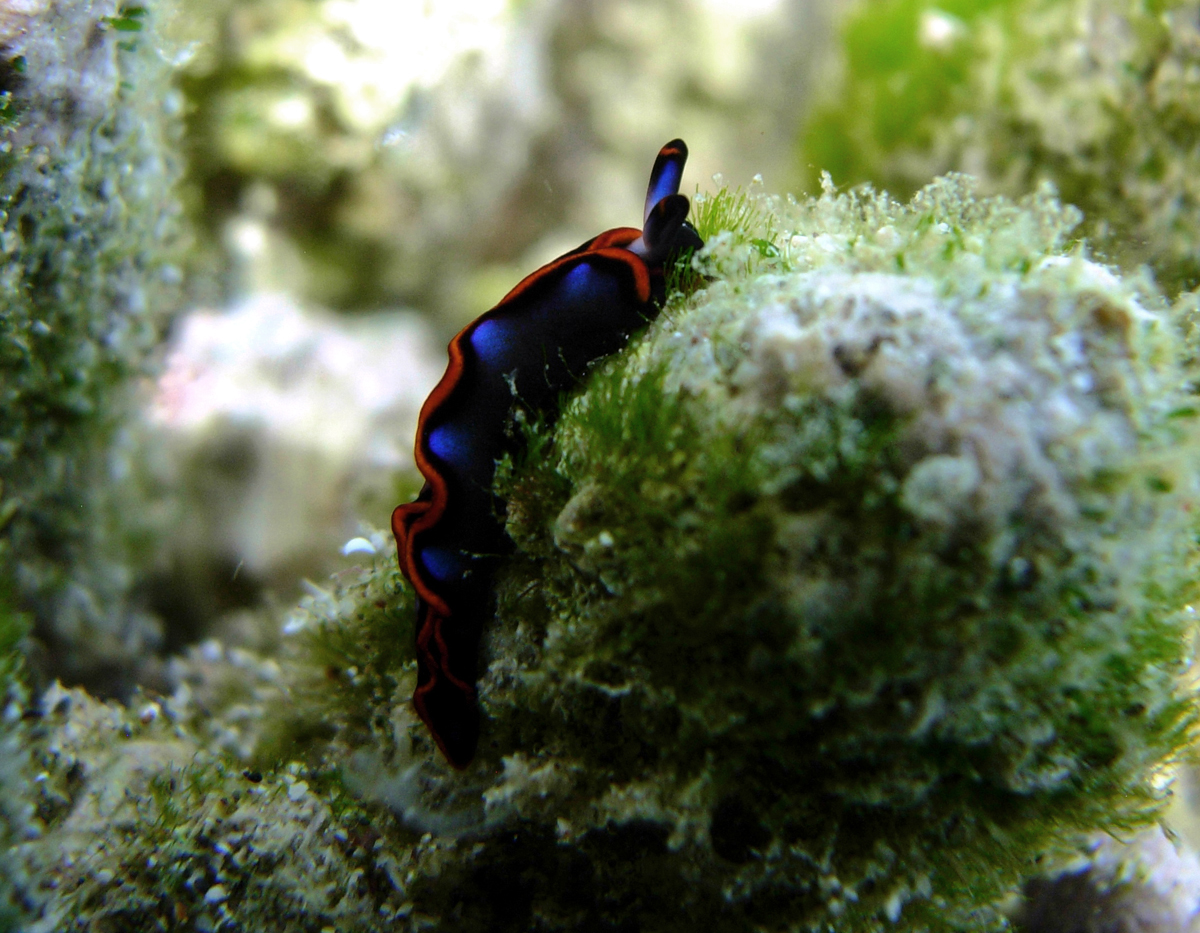
Thuridilla indopacifica

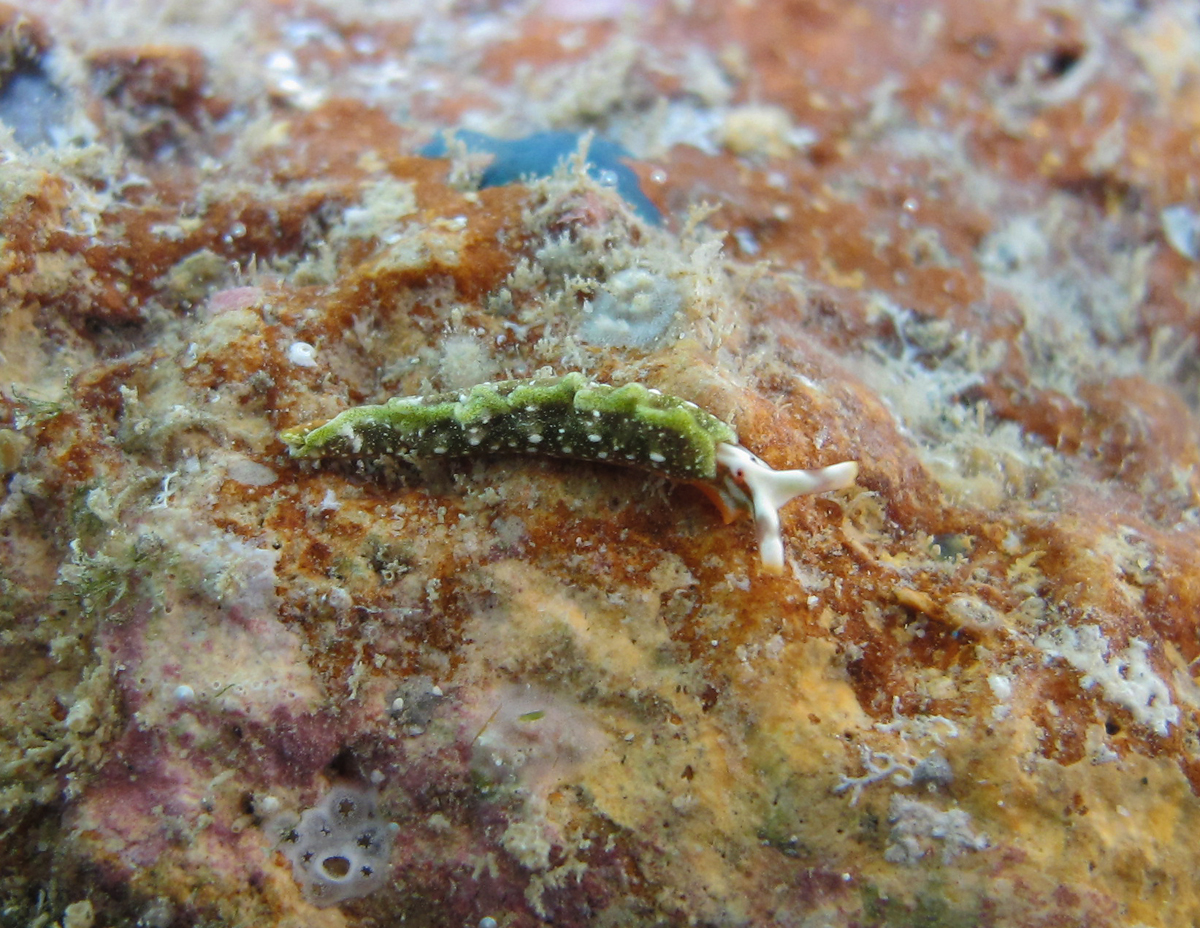
Thuridilla kathae

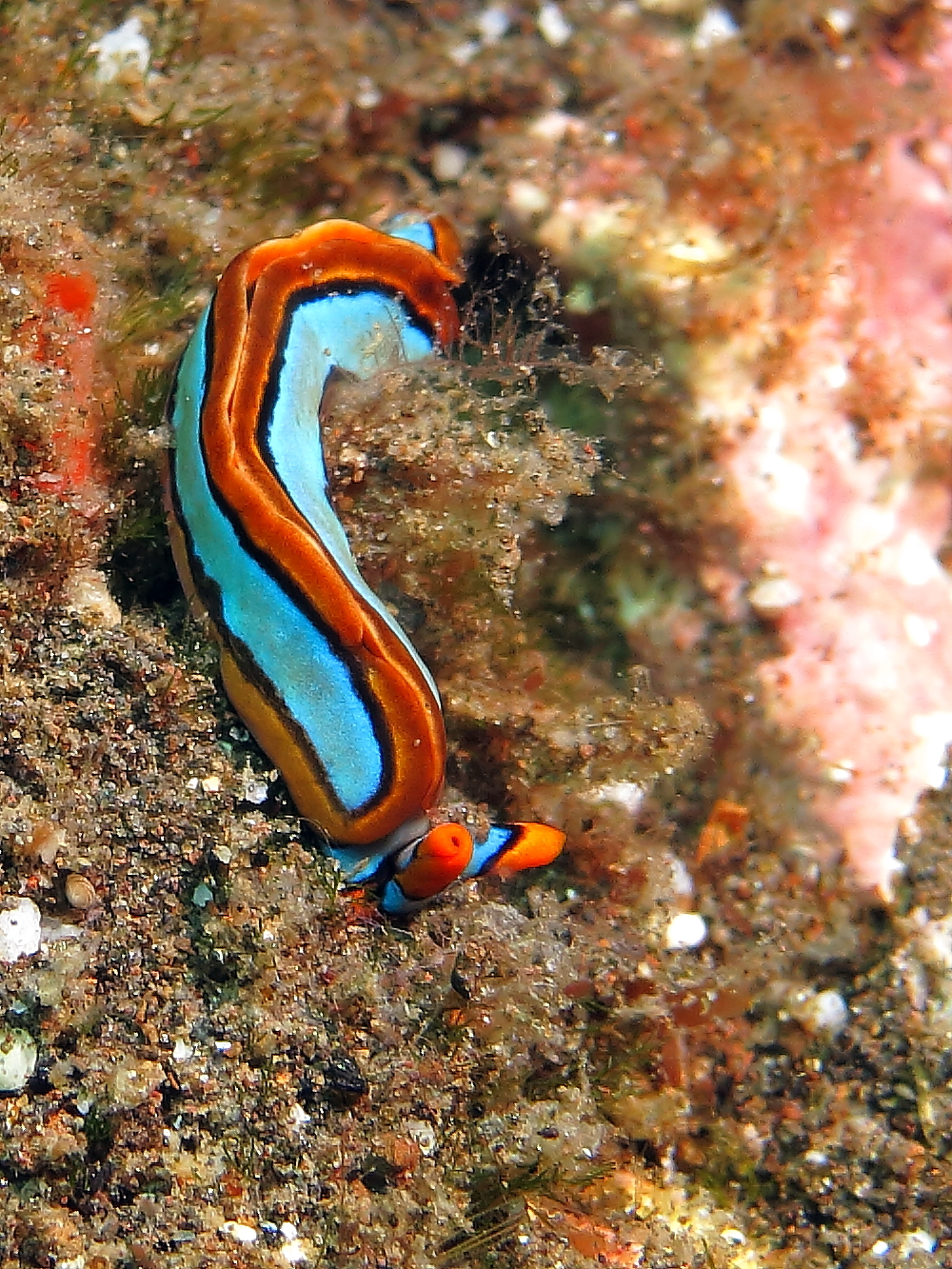
Thuridilla lineolata

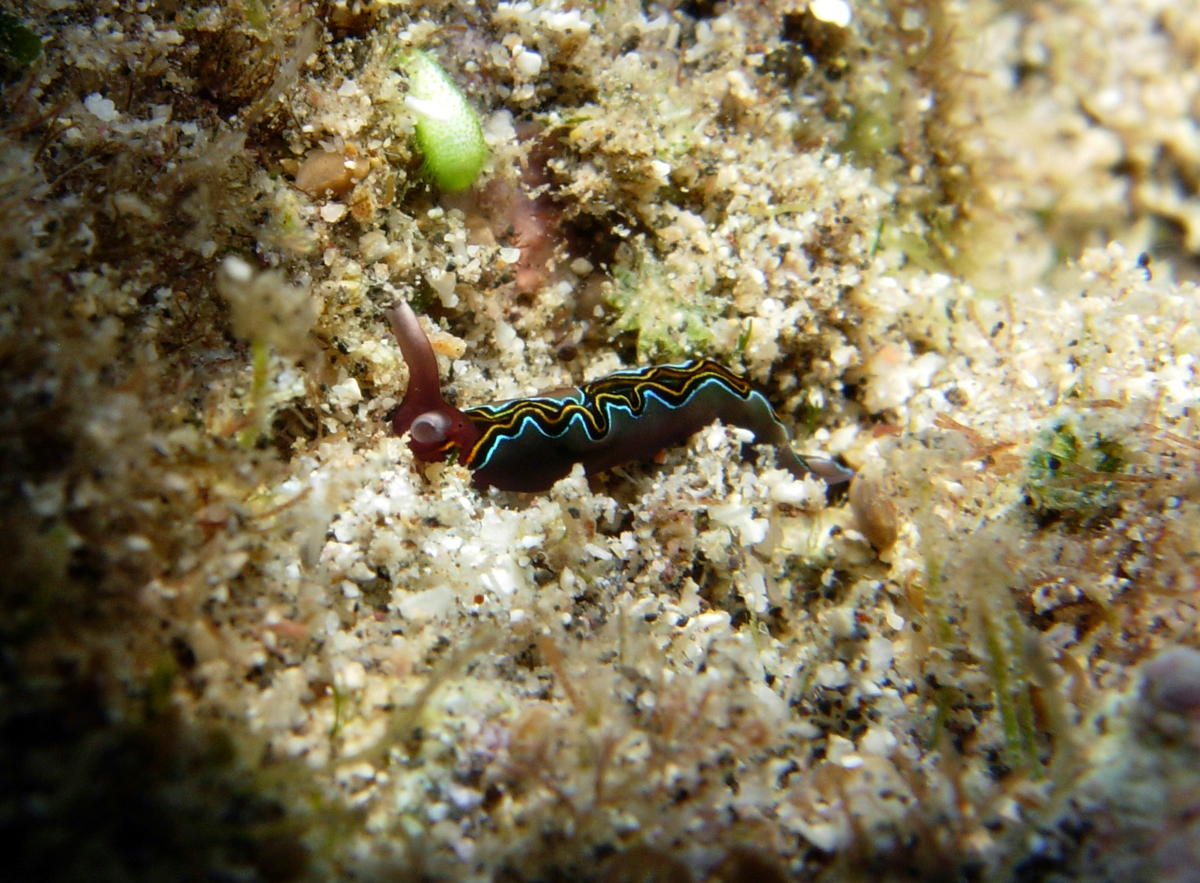
Thuridilla livida

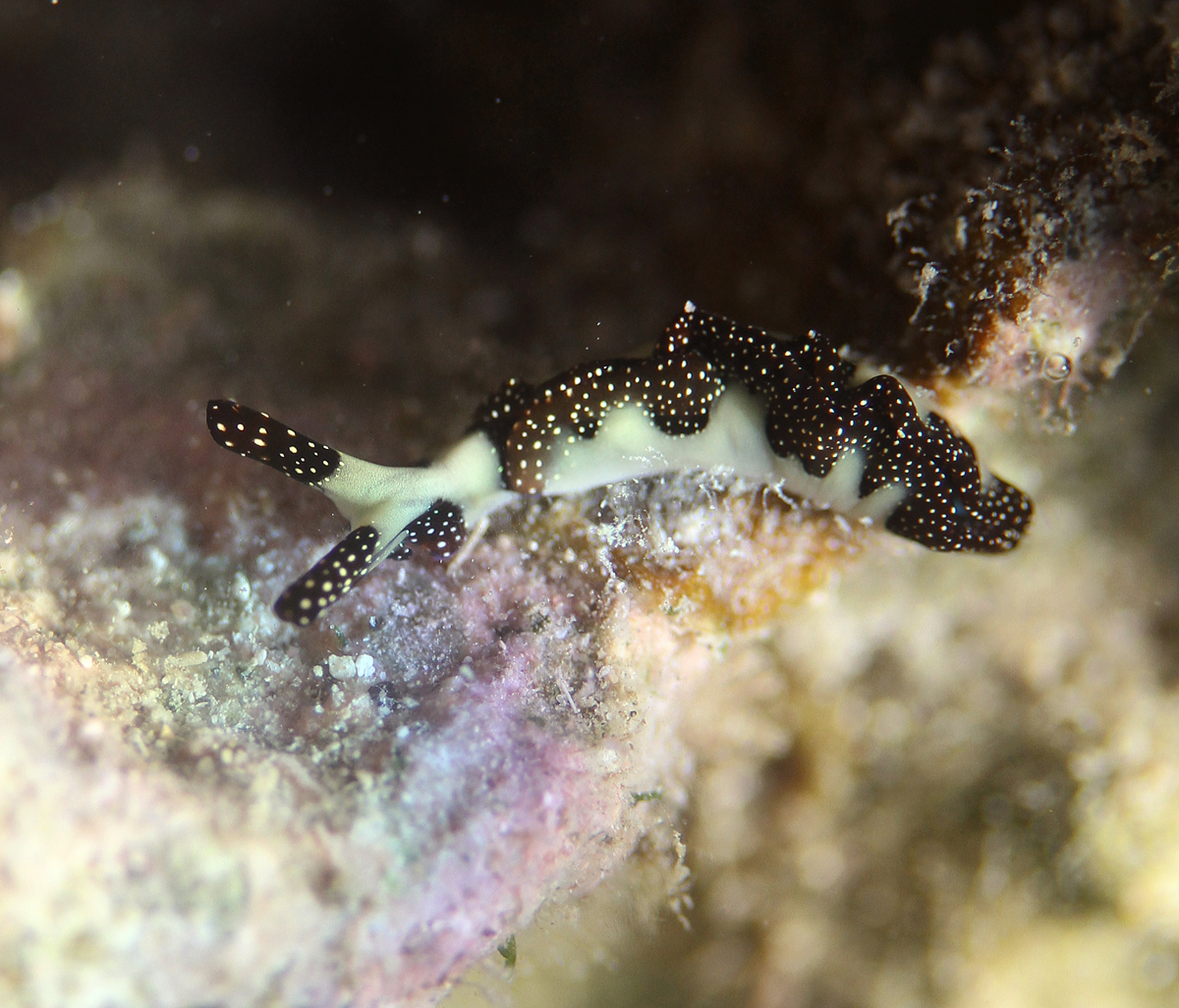
Thuridilla moebii

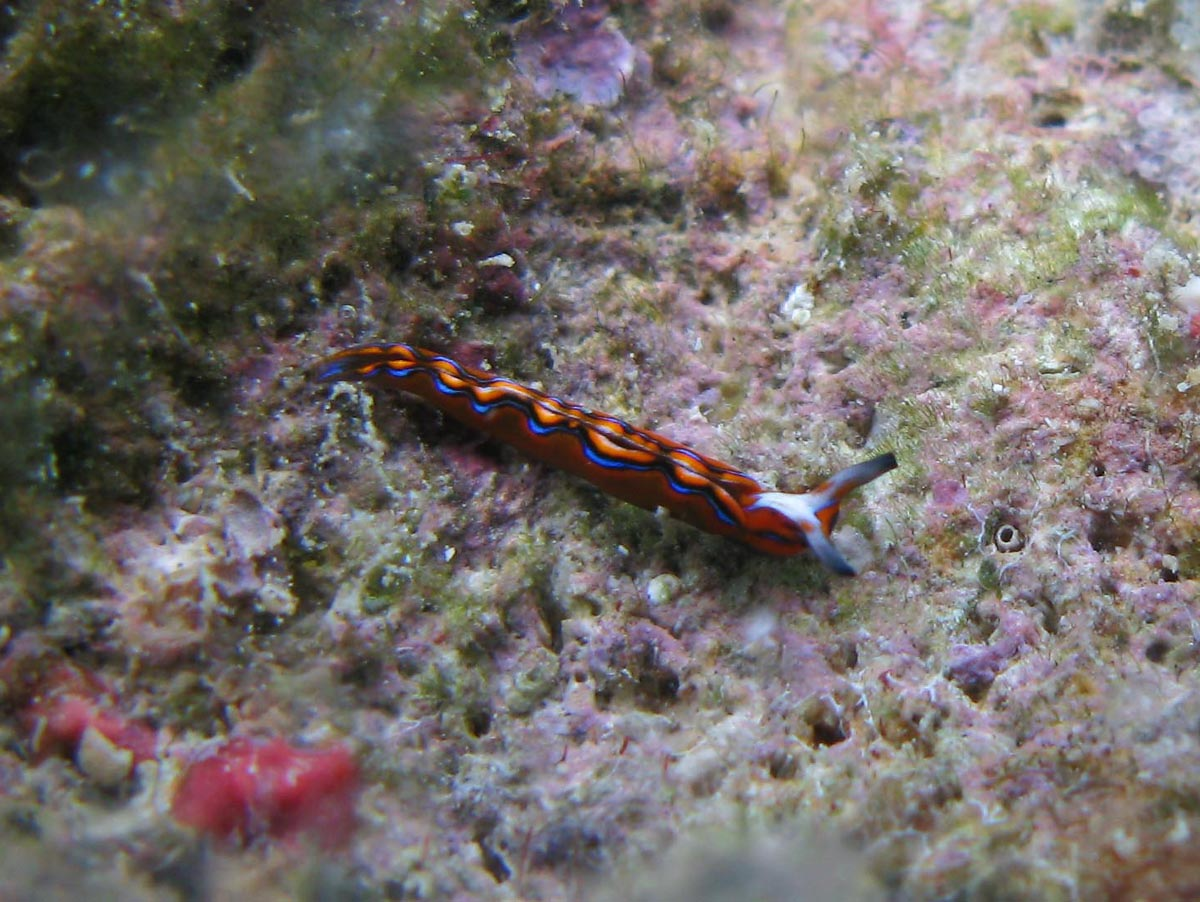
Thuridilla multimarginata

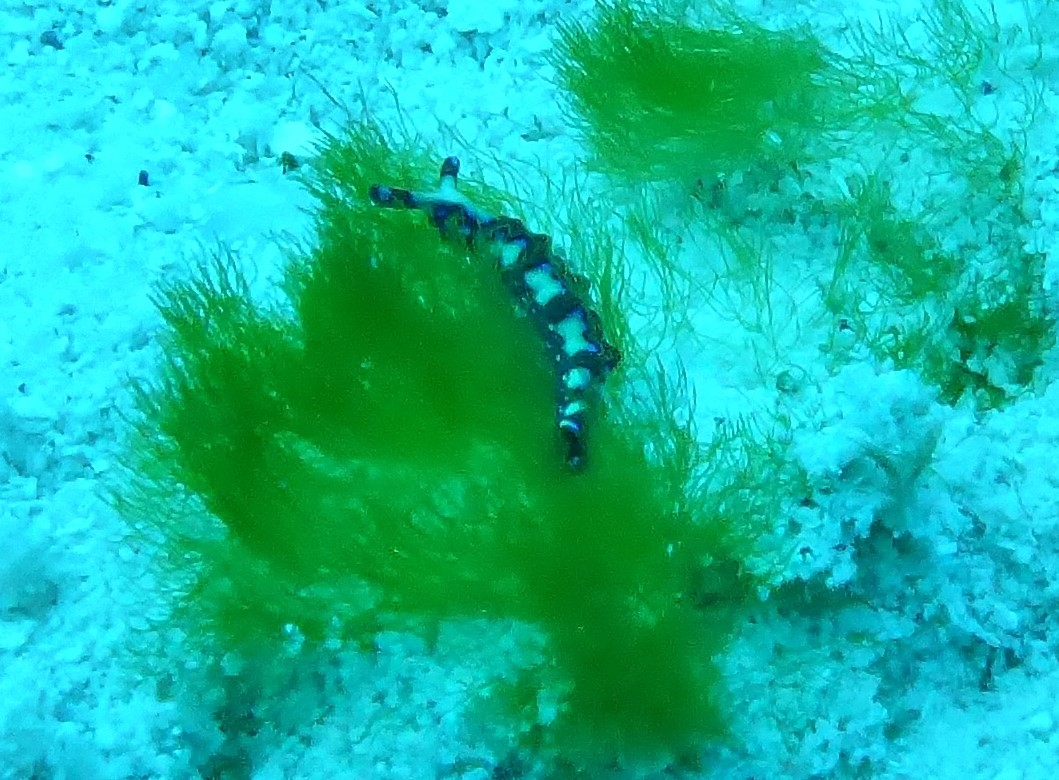
Thuridilla picta

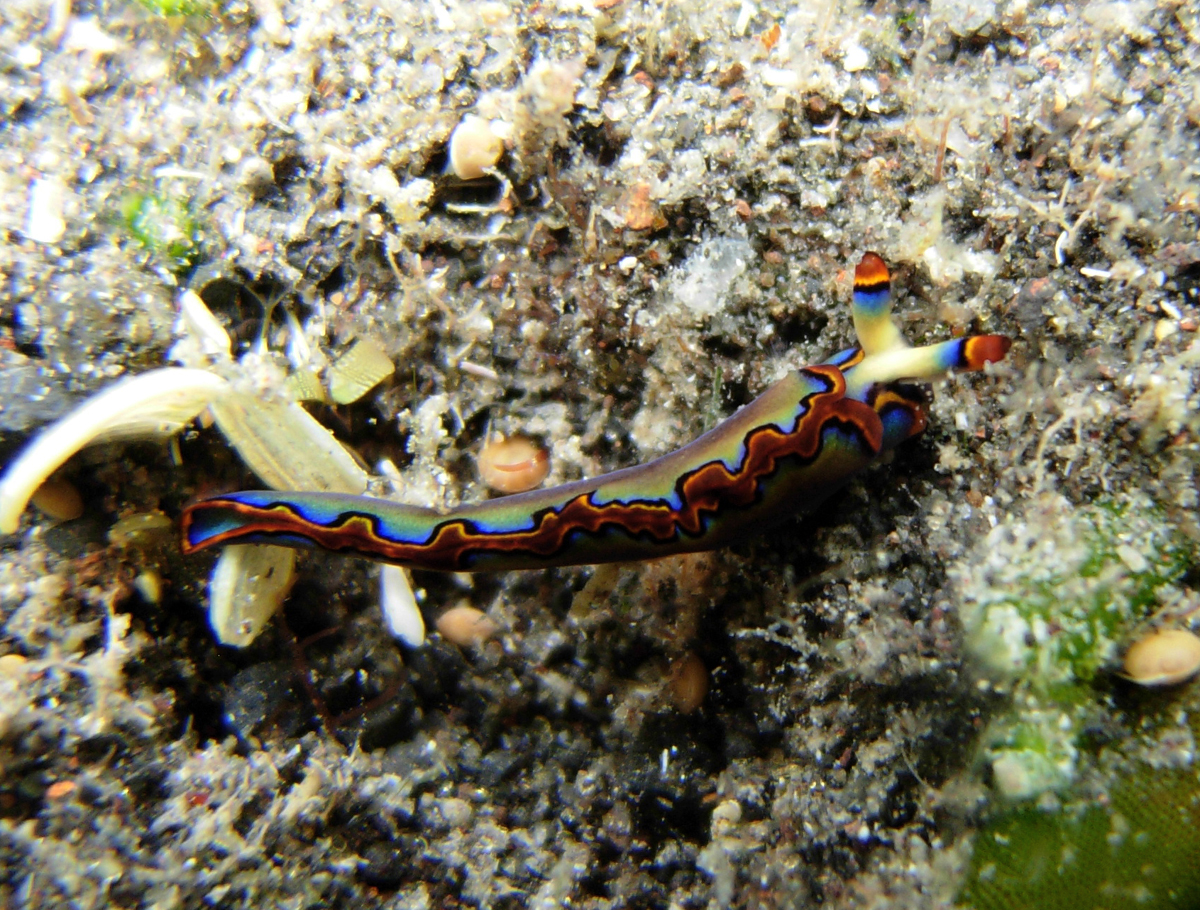
Thuridilla undula

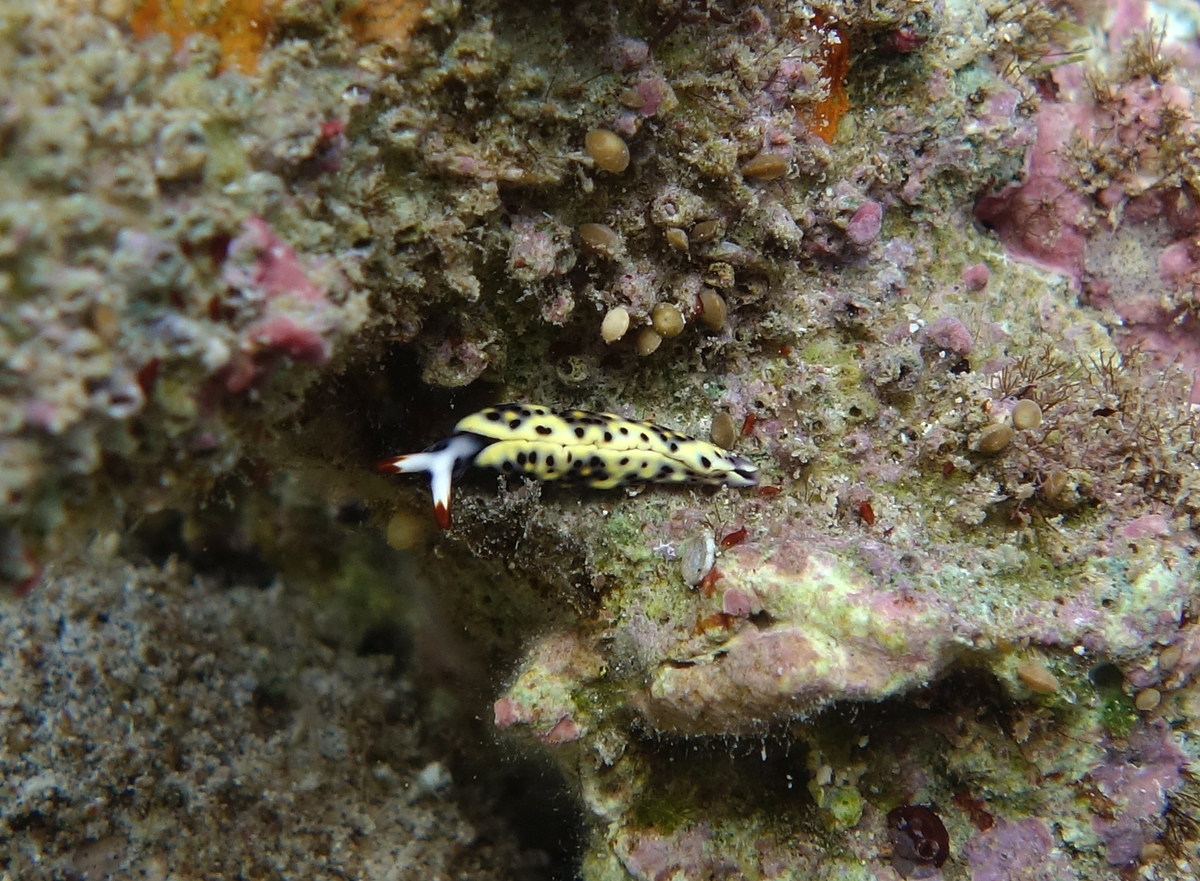
Thuridilla vataae
