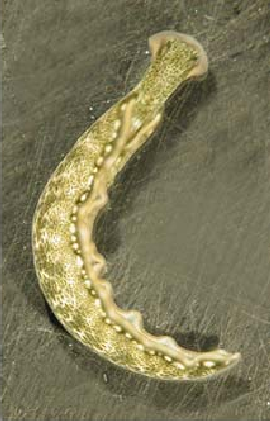
- A live individual of Thuridilla carlsoni about 2 cm in length

Scientific classification
- Domain: Eukaryota
- Kingdom: Animalia
- Phylum: Mollusca
- Class: Gastropoda
- Family: Plakobranchidae
- Genus: Thuridilla
- Species: T. carlsoni

Binomial name
- Thuridilla carlsoni Gosliner, 1995

= Thuridilla carlsoni =

Species of gastropod

Thuridilla carlsoni is a species of sacoglossan sea slug, a shell-less marine opisthobranch gastropod mollusk in the family Plakobranchidae.

== Distribution ==
This species occurs in the Pacific Ocean.
