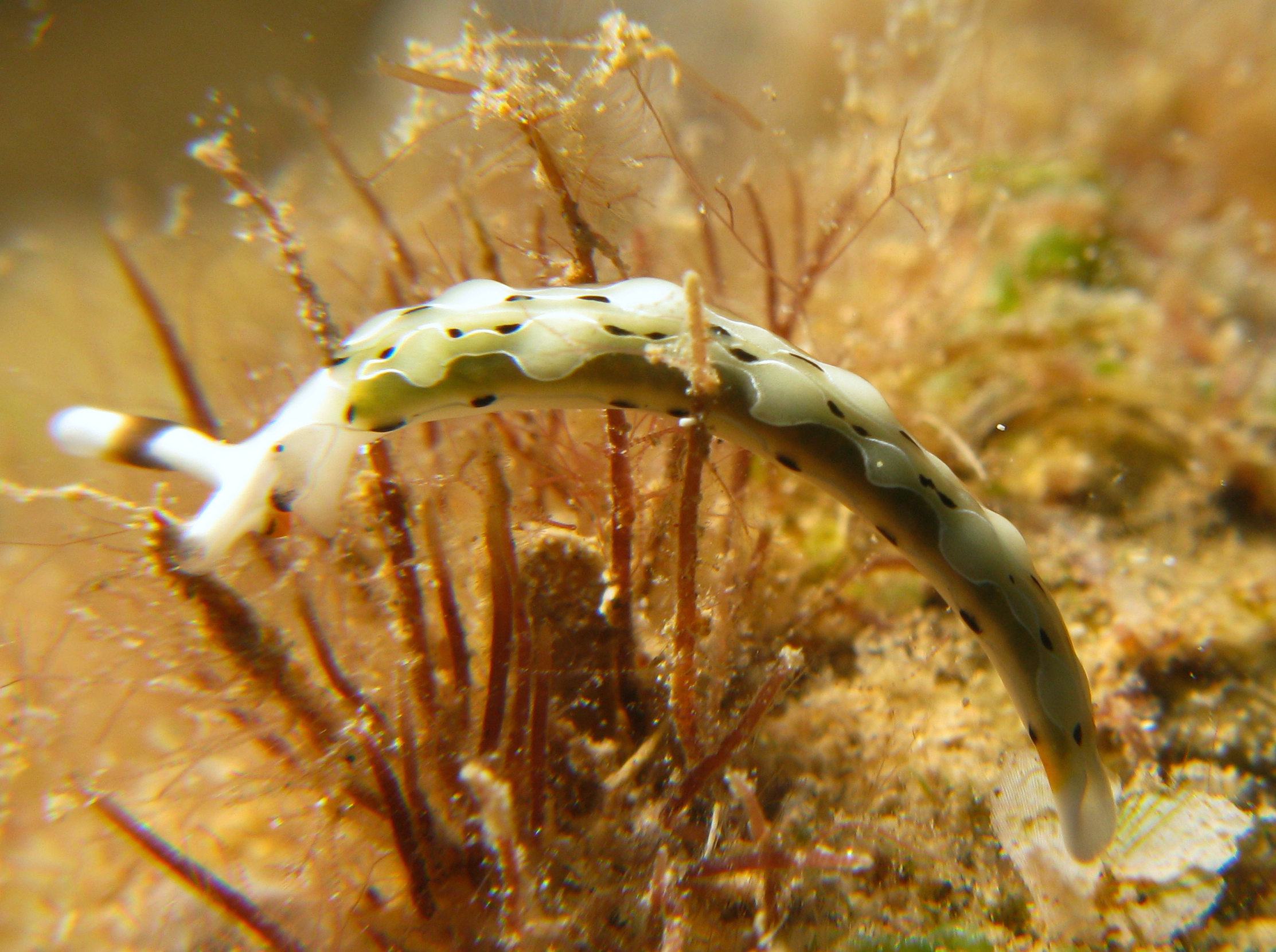
- A live individual of Thuridilla decorata in situ, head end towards the left

Scientific classification
- Domain: Eukaryota
- Kingdom: Animalia
- Phylum: Mollusca
- Class: Gastropoda
- Family: Plakobranchidae
- Genus: Thuridilla
- Species: T. decorata

Binomial name
- Thuridilla decorata (Heller & Thompson, 1983)

= Thuridilla decorata =

Species of gastropod

Thuridilla decorata is a species of sacoglossan sea slug, a shell-less marine opisthobranch gastropod mollusk in the family Plakobranchidae.

== Distribution ==
This species occurs in both the Gulf of Oman and the Red Sea.
