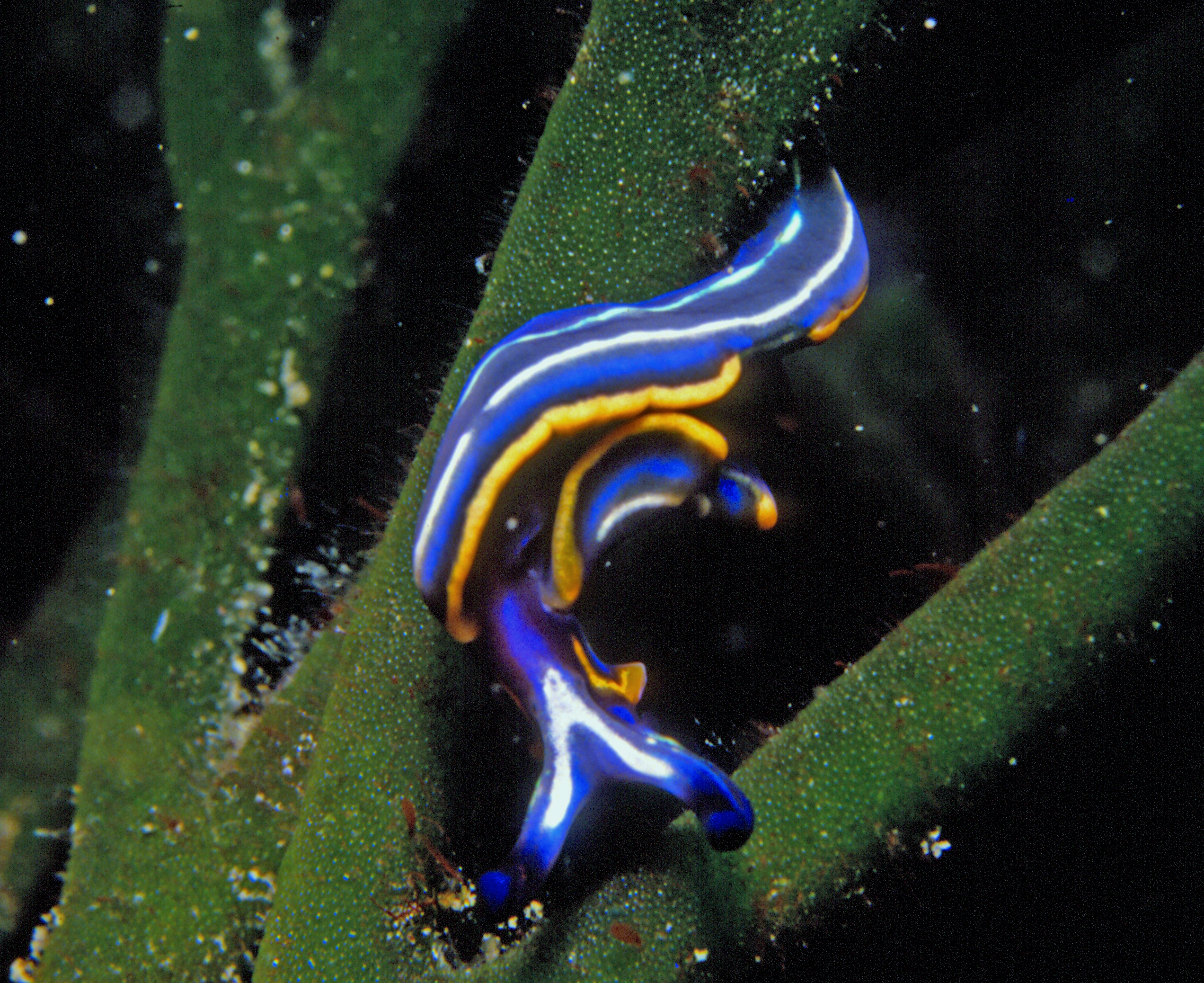
- A live individual of Thuridilla hopei, head end towards the bottom
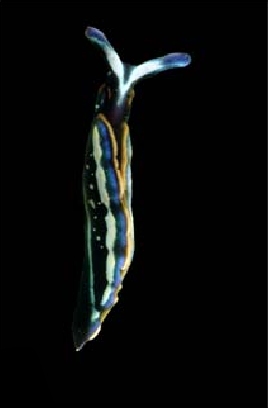
- Thuridilla hopei about 2 cm in length

Scientific classification
- Kingdom: Animalia
- Phylum: Mollusca
- Class: Gastropoda
- Superorder: Sacoglossa
- Family: Plakobranchidae
- Genus: Thuridilla
- Species: T. hopei

Binomial name
- Thuridilla hopei (Verany, 1853)

Synonyms
- Elysia splendida Grube, 1861

= Thuridilla hopei =

Species of gastropod

Thuridilla hopei is a species of sacoglossan sea slug, a shell-less marine opisthobranch gastropod mollusks in the family Plakobranchidae.

== Distribution ==
The type locality for this marine species is Nice, France, in the Mediterranean Sea. This species is also found off Spain, Portugal and Greece. It is found in the benthic zone in subtropical climates.
