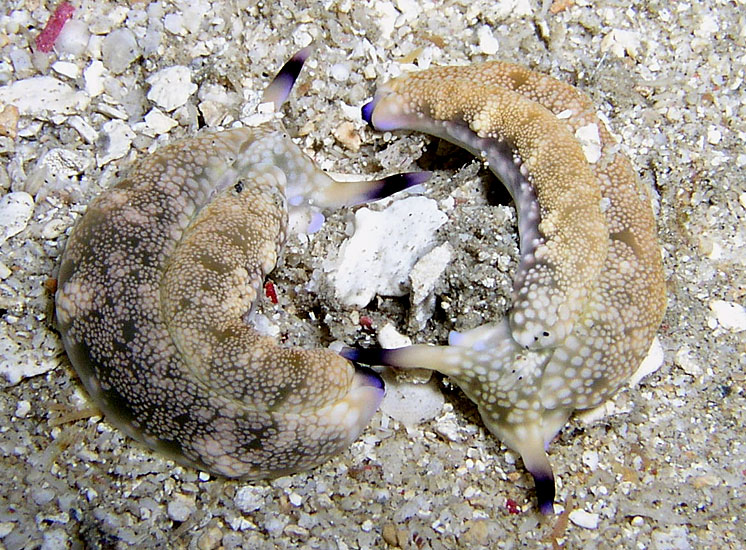
- Two Plakobranchus ocellatus sea slugs facing in opposite directions

Scientific classification
- Kingdom: Animalia
- Phylum: Mollusca
- Class: Gastropoda
- Superorder: Sacoglossa
- Family: Plakobranchidae
- Genus: Plakobranchus
- Species: P. ocellatus

Binomial name
- Plakobranchus ocellatus (van Hasselt, 1824)

Synonyms
- Elysia ocellata Pease, 1860; Placobranchus gracilis Pease, 1871; Placobranchus guttatus Stimpson, 1855; Plakobranchus guttatus Stimpson, 1855; Placobranchus ianthobaptus Gould, 1852; Plakobranchus ianthobaptus Gould, 1852; Placobranchus ocellatus van Hasselt, 1824 (an incorrect subsequent spelling by Férussac (1824) in a translation of van Hasselt's work.); Placobranchus variegatus Pease, 1871; Plakobranchus argus Bergh, 1872; Plakobranchus camiguinus Bergh, 1872; Plakobranchus chlorophacus Bergh, 1873; Plakobranchus laetus Bergh, 1872; Plakobranchus priapinus Bergh, 1872; Plakobranchus punctulatus Bergh, 1872

= Plakobranchus ocellatus =

Species of sea slug

Plakobranchus ocellatus is a species of sea slug, a sacoglossan, a marine opisthobranch gastropod mollusk in the family Plakobranchidae. It is found in shallow water in the Indo-Pacific region.

== Distribution ==
This species occurs in the Indo-Pacific. Recent work on the photosynthetic abilities of Plakobranchus reveals that P. ocellatus is actually a species complex consisting of at least four distinct clades.

== Description ==
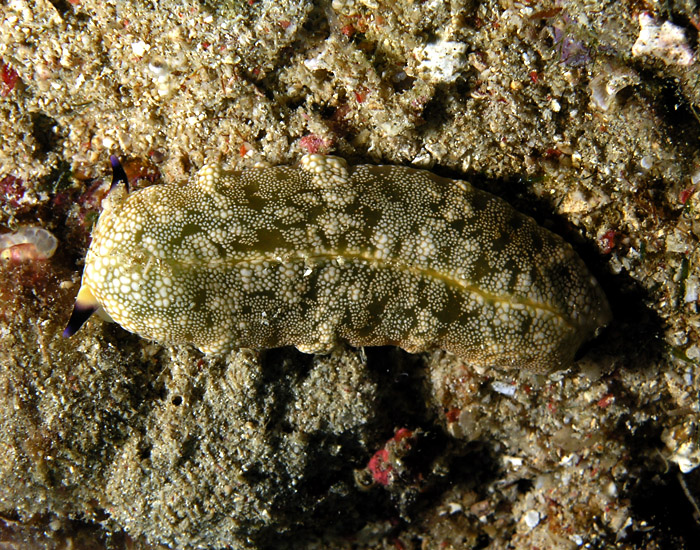
Plakobranchus ocellatus, head end towards the left

The body is broad, truncate, and rather flattened, up to 4 cm (1.6 in) long. The head is flat and squarish, the rhinophores being folded longitudinally. The mouth is at the front apex of the head and the eyes are very close together, being visible through the semi-transparent skin of the head. The dorsal surface of the sea slug has a number of longitudinal ridges, but when at rest, the parapodia are folded up over the midline of the body so that the dorsal surface is concealed from view. On the underside, the foot is broad and long, but is not clearly demarcated from the mantle. The ground colour of this sea slug is usually pale green, beige, or cream with large ocelli (spots similar to eyespots) of cream, brown, pink, and purple in varying shades. The sole of the foot also has ocelli.

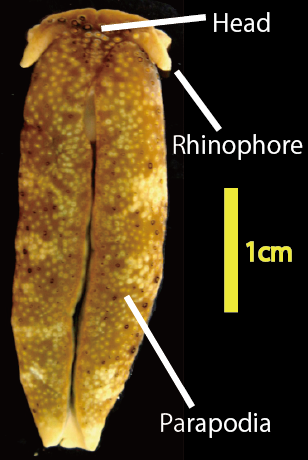
Dorsal view of a freshly collected intact Plakobranchus ocellatus showing its head, rhinophores and parapodia.

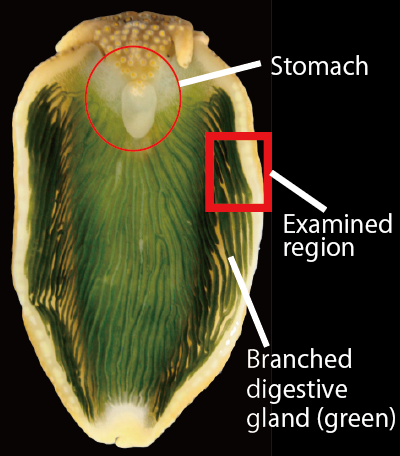
Dorsal view of an anesthetized individual of Plakobranchus ocellatus with spread parapodia. Stomach and branched digestive glands are visible. The tissue region in the red square was dissected and used for DNA extraction in the study by Maeda T. et al. (2012).

== Habitat ==
These seaslugs live in sheltered, shallow water habitats with stones or gravel and silt. They feed on a broad food spectrum, including members of the genera Halimeda, Caulerpa, Udotea, Acetabularia and further unidentified algae, with an emphasis on Halimeda macroloba.
