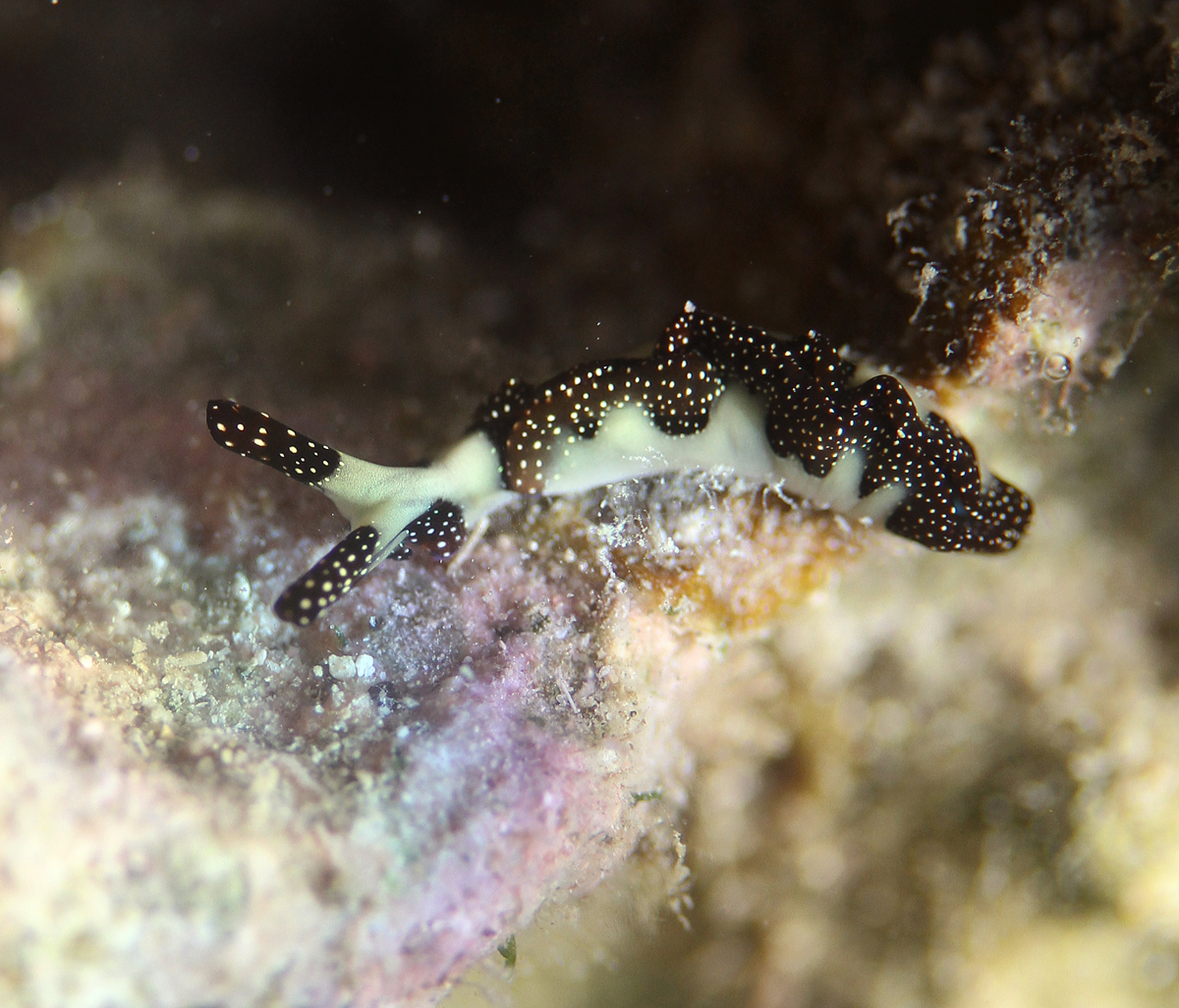

Scientific classification
- Kingdom: Animalia
- Phylum: Mollusca
- Class: Gastropoda
- Family: Plakobranchidae
- Genus: Thuridilla
- Species: T. moebii

Binomial name
- Thuridilla moebii (Bergh, 1888)

Synonyms
- Elysia moebii (Bergh, 1888); Plakobranchus moebii Bergh, 1888

= Thuridilla moebii =

Species of gastropod

Thuridilla moebii is a species of sacoglossan sea slug, a shell-less marine opisthobranch gastropod mollusc in the family Plakobranchidae. It is found in shallow water in the tropical west and central Indo-Pacific region.

== Description ==
Thuridilla moebii is a small, slender slug, growing to a maximum length of about 2 cm (0.8 in). On either side of the body there are parapodia which fold up and over the back, joining at the top, and forming a sheath from which the head projects at the front. The basic colour is translucent white, often tinted with bluish-green, or even pale blue. Along the upper surface is a bold longitudinal, zigzag band of contrasting colour, usually deep orange above and blackish below (but sometimes all black), uniformly speckled with white dots. The head is white and bears a pair of large, rolled rhinophores, which extend forward, the tips of which match the colouring of the band on the body. The front edge of the foot has a similar colouring.

== Distribution and habitat ==
Thuridilla moebii is found in shallow water in the tropical and subtropical Indo-Pacific region, its range extending from South Africa to Western Australia, including Mayotte, the Comoro Islands, Réunion and Mauritius. Its habitat includes sandy areas where detritus accumulates, and rocky reefs with scanty coral cover and suitable algal growth.

== Ecology ==
Members of the Thuridilla genus are vegetarians, feeding on algae. Thuridilla moebii has a saw-edged radula which it uses to grate or puncture the cell walls of the algae on which it feeds. The individual sea slug examined when the species was redescribed in 1995 had 23 triangular teeth in a single row on the radula. The teeth are constantly being replaced as they wear down, the discarded teeth falling into a special sac in the mouth where they are retained. The precise diet for this species is not known, but in Réunion it is reported to often be seen on a green alga, the spherical turtle shell (Bornetella sphaerica).

Thuridilla moebii is a simultaneous hermaphrodite; the penis is located on the head just behind the right rhinophore. When breeding, two individuals entwine in such a way as to bring the right sides of their heads together, and sperm is passed between the pair. Later, each individual lays an orange egg ribbon in the form of a wide spiral, sticking the gelatinous thread to the substrate.
