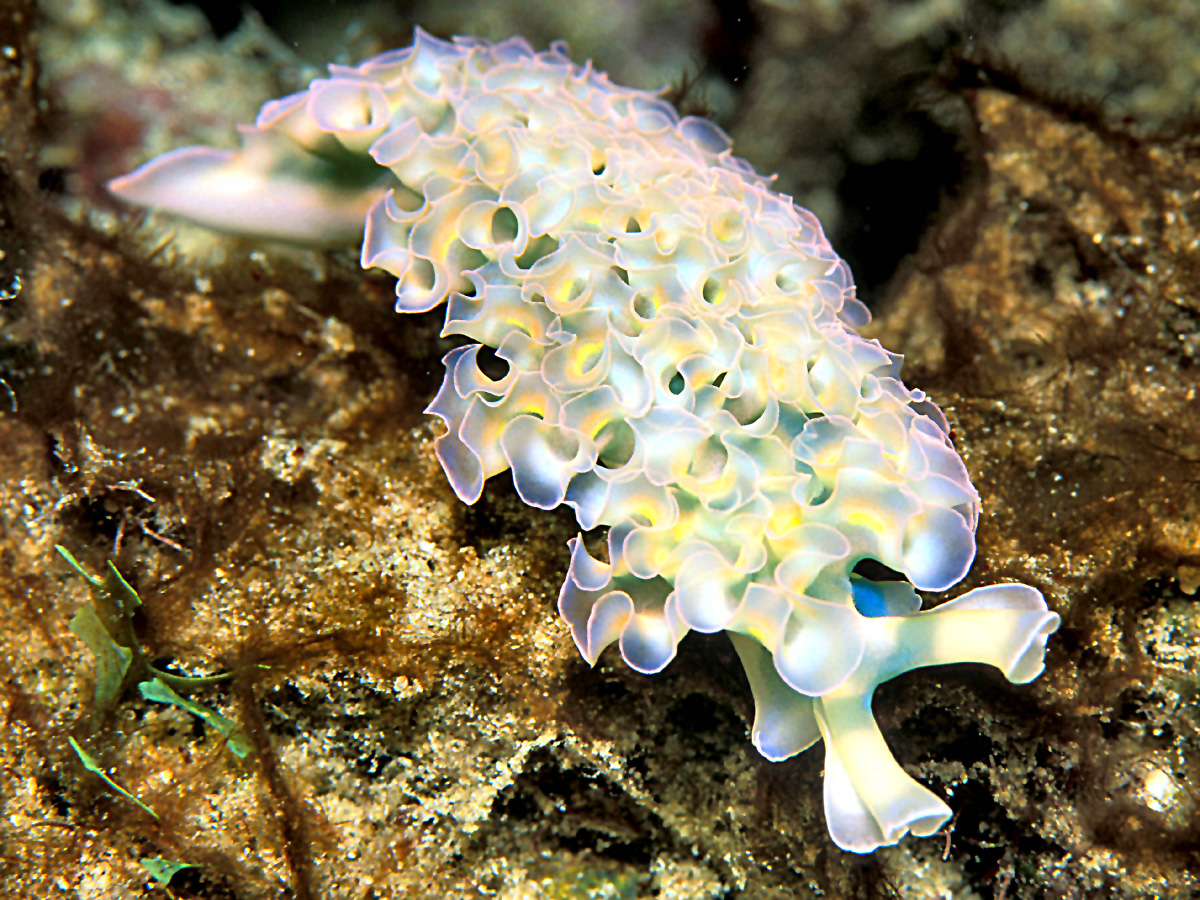
- A live individual of Elysia crispata, head end towards the lower right

Scientific classification
- Kingdom: Animalia
- Phylum: Mollusca
- Class: Gastropoda
- Superorder: Sacoglossa
- Superfamily: Plakobranchoidea
- Family: Plakobranchidae; Gray, 1840

Synonyms
- Placobranchidae Gray, 1840; Actaeonidae Allman, 1845; Boselliidae Ev. Marcus, 1982; Elysiidae Forbes & Hanley, 1851

= Plakobranchidae =

Family of gastropods

Plakobranchidae is a family of sea slugs, marine opisthobranch gastropod mollusks in the superfamily Plakobranchoidea. They superficially resemble nudibranchs but they are sacoglossans, members of the clade Sacoglossa within the Opisthobranchia.

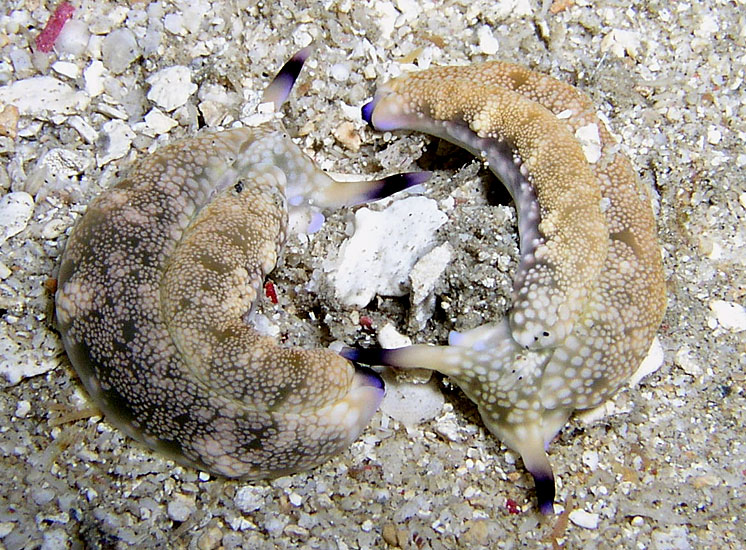
Two Plakobranchus ocellatus seaslugs

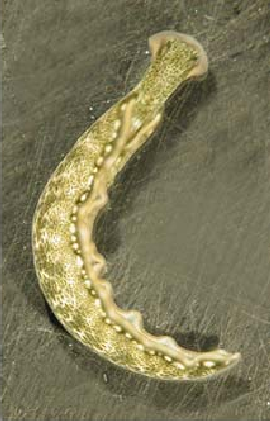
Thuridilla carlsoni

== Taxonomy ==
Elysiidae was originally described as "Elysiadae" by Forbes & Hanley in 1851 in the book A history of British Mollusca and their Shells 3:613. In the taxonomy of Bouchet & Rocroi (2005), the family Elysiidae is considered to be a synonym of the family Plakobranchidae Gray, 1840.

The original spelling Placobranchidae, based on Placobranchus, an incorrect subsequent spelling by Férussac (1824) in a translation of van Hasselt's work. Franc (1968: 848) and Jensen (1996: 92) attributed the name to Rang, 1829 (p. 134), who used the vernacular "les Placobranches". Jensen (1997: 180-181) argued for the restoration of the spelling Plakobranchidae, and she has been followed by Wägele & Willan (2000: 91). Bouchet & Rocroi (2005: 133), argued that the spellings Placobranchus and Placobranchidae were in prevailing usage and were conserved under Art. 33.3.1. This view has been challenged by R. Burn and the spelling Plakobranchidae is now preferred.

This family has no subfamilies.

== Genera ==
Genera in the family Plakobranchidae are:

- Bosellia Trinchese, 1891
- Elysia Risso, 1818
- Plakobranchus van Hasselt, 1824 – type genus
- Thuridilla Bergh, 1872
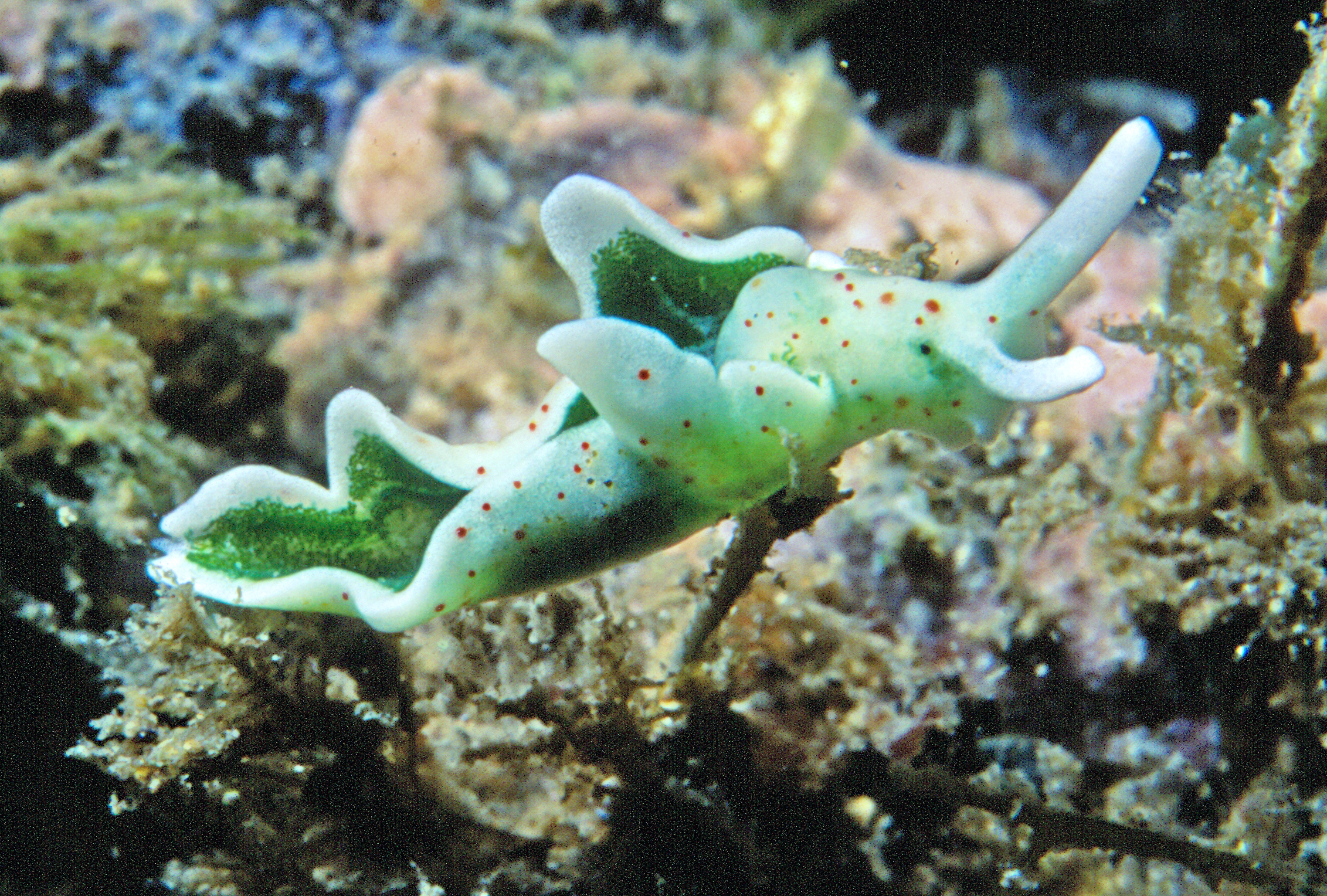
Elysia timida

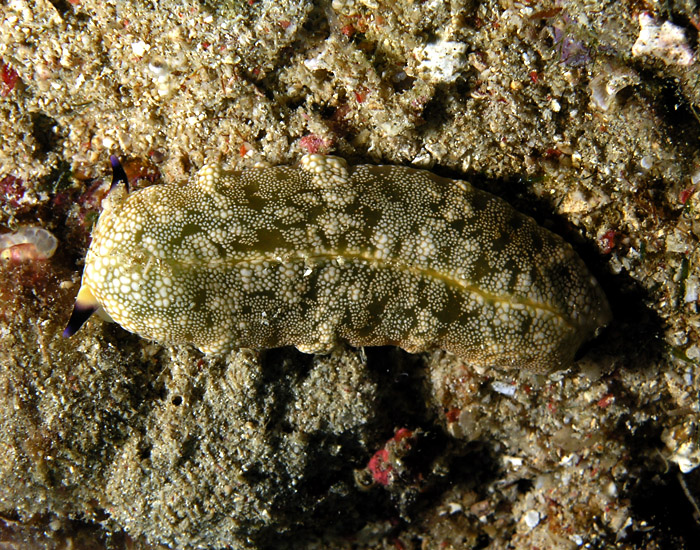
Plakobranchus ocellatus

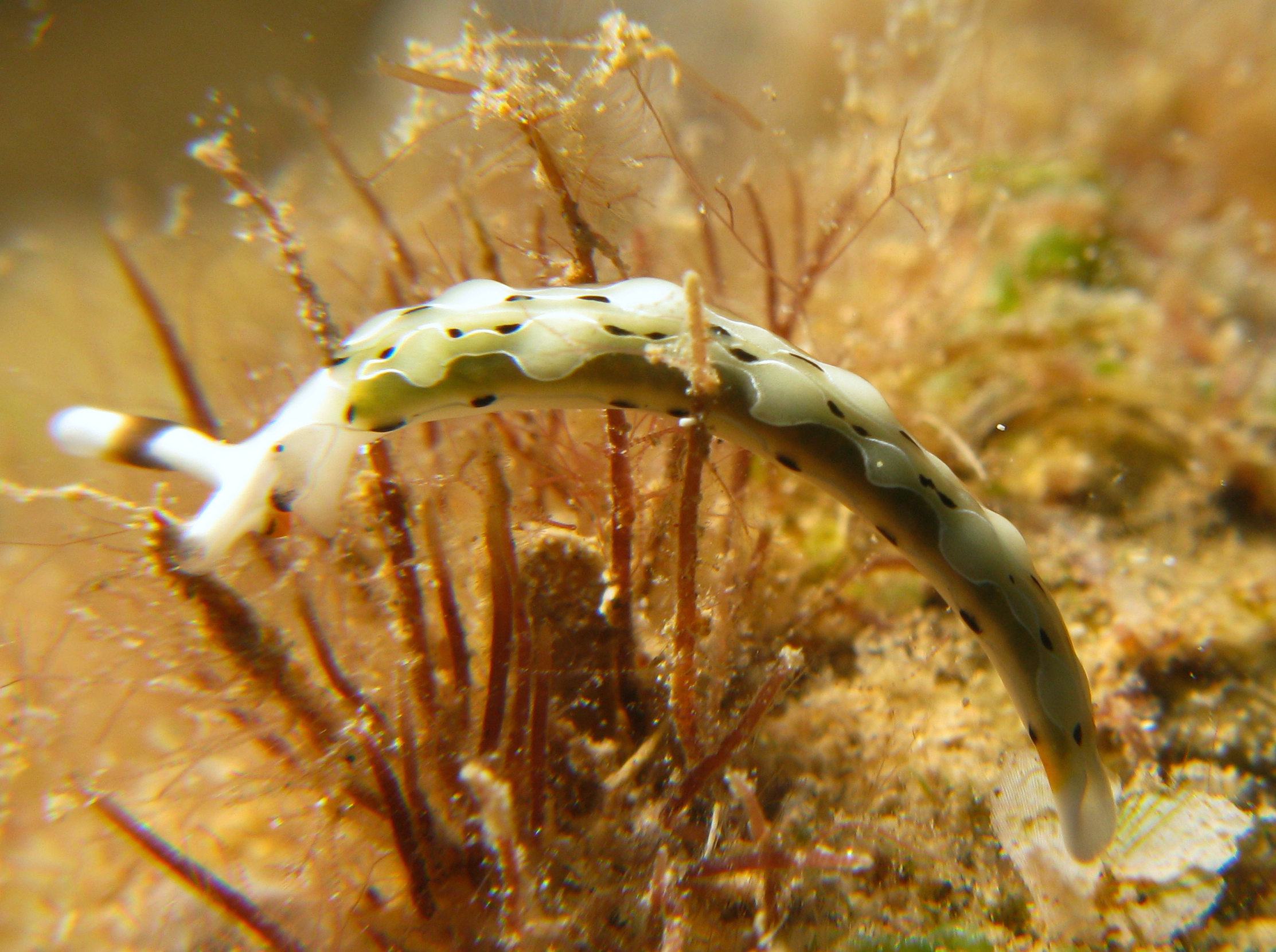
Thuridilla decorata

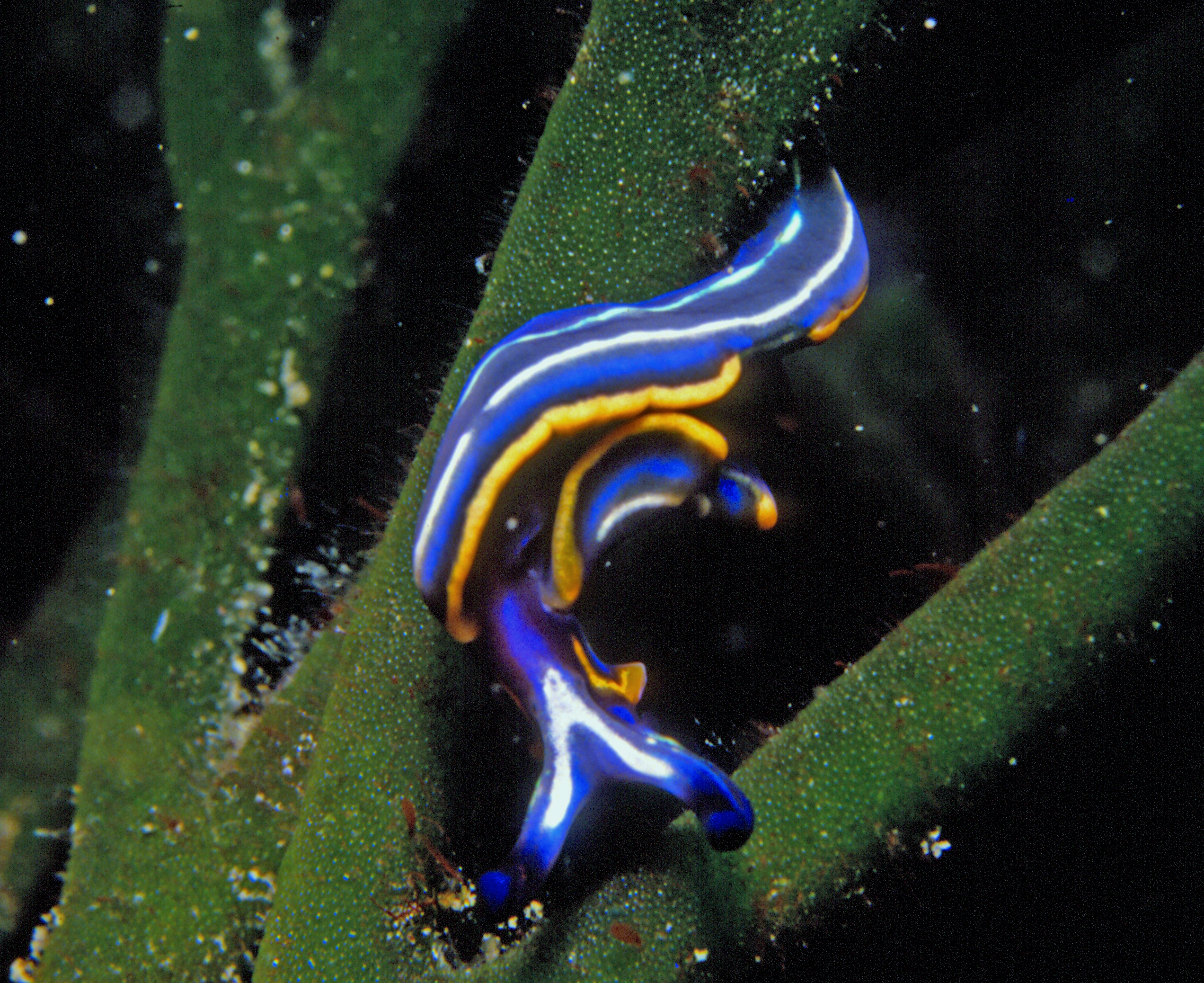
Thuridilla hopei

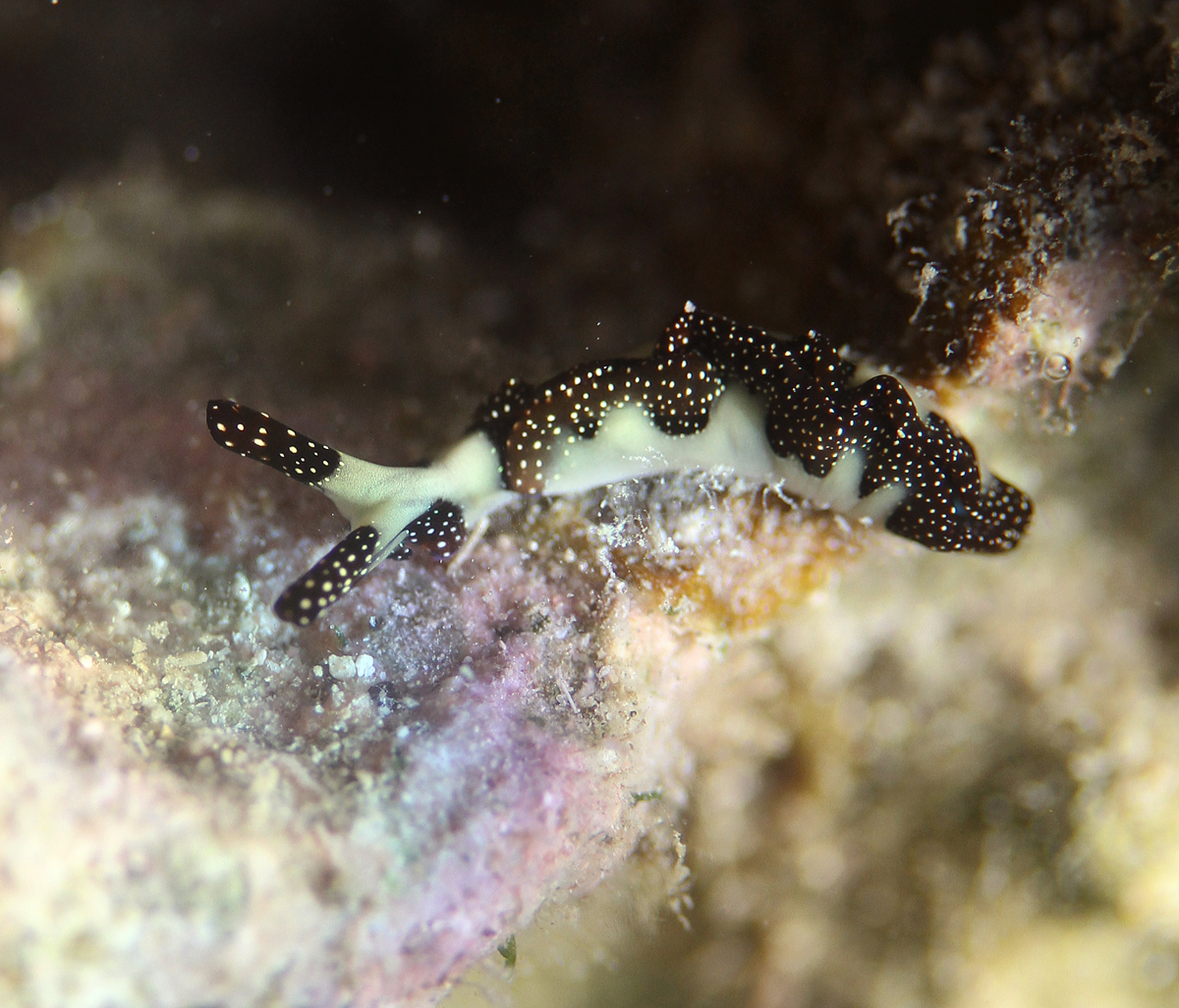
Thuridilla moebii
