= Priabona =

Priabona may refer to:

- Priabona (fly), an extinct genus of big-headed flies
- Priabona (Monte di Malo), in northern Italy, after which the Priabonian stratigraphic stage was named

== See also ==
- Priabonian, a geological age
