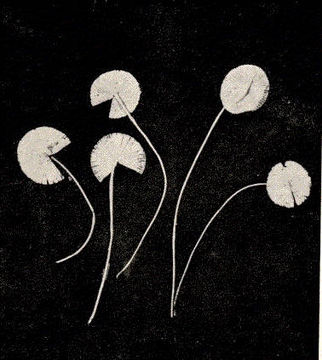

Scientific classification
- Clade: Viridiplantae
- Division: Chlorophyta
- Class: Ulvophyceae
- Order: Dasycladales
- Family: Polyphysaceae
- Genus: Acetabularia
- Species: A. crenulata

Binomial name
- Acetabularia crenulata J.V. Lamouroux

= Acetabularia crenulata =

Species of alga

Acetabularia crenulata, one of the many species known as mermaid's wineglass, is a form of green alga generally found in shallow tropical seas. It can be found growing in great abundance along stretches of the overseas highway to Key West, Florida bordering on Florida Bay. It has been used in some important research on nuclear and cytoplasmic relationships. During its life cycle it has one large nucleus.
