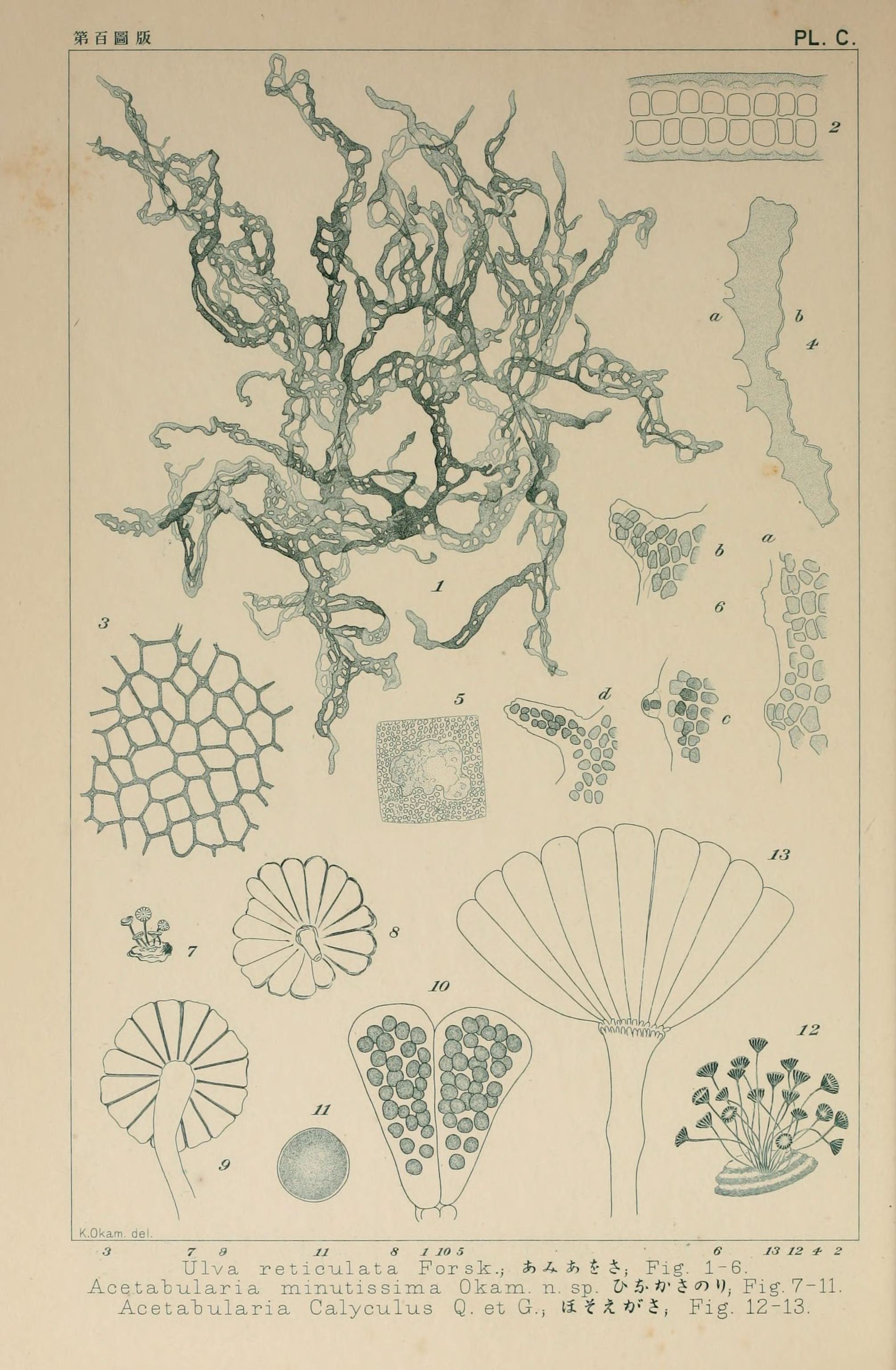
- Acetabularia caliculus (fig. 12-13)

Scientific classification
- Clade: Viridiplantae
- Division: Chlorophyta
- Class: Ulvophyceae
- Order: Dasycladales
- Family: Polyphysaceae
- Genus: Acetabularia
- Species: A. caliculus

Binomial name
- Acetabularia caliculus J.V. Lamouroux

= Acetabularia caliculus =

Species of alga

Acetabularia caliculus, the umbrella alga, is a species of green alga found in shallow temperate and tropical seas. It usually grows on pebbles, shells or pieces of rock, and is often found in seagrass meadows, on mudflats and coral reefs, in estuaries and growing on the submerged roots of mangroves. Each individual thallus consists of a single cell with a long stipe and a terminal cup-shaped or flattened disc.

== Description ==
The umbrella alga grows singly or in clusters. Each individual thallus consists of a single cell with a single nucleus. There is a holdfast where the alga is attached to the substrate and a long, slender, calcified stipe or stalk. The thallus is emerald green and cup-shaped, or occasionally flattened, with twenty-two to thirty rays. The stipe is up to 7 centimetres (2.8 in) long and the disc up to 7 millimetres (0.28 in) in diameter. In immature specimens, the stipe has a complex structure of short branches but by the time the alga reaches maturity, only the scars of these remain.

== Distribution and habitat ==
The umbrella alga has a widespread distribution in shallow temperate and tropical seas, occurring on the eastern coast of the United States from North Carolina southwards, the Caribbean Sea and Gulf of Mexico and on the eastern side of the Atlantic and the Mediterranean Sea. It is also found in the Indo-Pacific and the seas around Australia and New Zealand. It most often grows on pebbles, shells or pieces of rock at depths down to 20 metres (66 ft). It is often found in seagrass meadows, on mudflats and coral reefs, in estuaries and growing on the submerged roots of mangroves.

== Biology ==
The green colour of the umbrella alga is caused by the presence within the cell of chlorophyll and the plant's energy needs are supplied by photosynthesis. If the plant is broken in two pieces, each is able to survive and regenerate new parts, even the one that lacks a nucleus, although the anucleated fragment will die after a few weeks. The umbrella alga has the ability to remove mercury from sea water and concentrate the metal in its tissues in polypeptides.

Sexual reproduction takes place after tiny cyst-like gametangia develop on the rays of the disc. These have tiny caps which open to release gametes into the sea. Each plant produces only one type of gamete, and two gametes of different types unite to form a zygote. This sinks to the bottom of the sea and begins to produce a new stipe which later develops several whorls of short hairs and eventually a new disc. The life cycle takes about six months to complete.
