= Schlumberger (surname) =

Schlumberger is a surname. Notable people with the surname include:

- Schlumberger brothers — Conrad (1878–1936) and Marcel (1884–1953) Schlumberger — founded the Société de Prospection Electrique that later became Schlumberger Limited and is now SLB
  - Schlumberger array, a type of array used in electrical resistivity tomography, pioneered by the Schlumberger brothers
- Charles Schlumberger (1825–1905), French paleontologist known for his studies of Foraminifera
- Daniel Schlumberger (1905–1972), French archaeologist
- Gustave Schlumberger (1844–1929), French historian and numismatist who specialised in the era of the crusades
- Jean Schlumberger (writer) (1877–1968), French writer, brother of Conrad and Marcel, journalist and co-founder of the Nouvelle Revue Française
- Jean Schlumberger (jewelry designer) (1907–1987), French jewelry designer for Tiffany & Co.
- Liesbeth Schlumberger, organist from South Africa
- Marguerite Schlumberger, (1853–1924) French women's suffrage advocate
- Robert Schlumberger von Goldeck (1814–1879), Austrian producer of sparkling wine
- Thorsten Schlumberger (born 1960), German footballer
- William Schlumberger (1800–1838), French chess player of the 19th century
