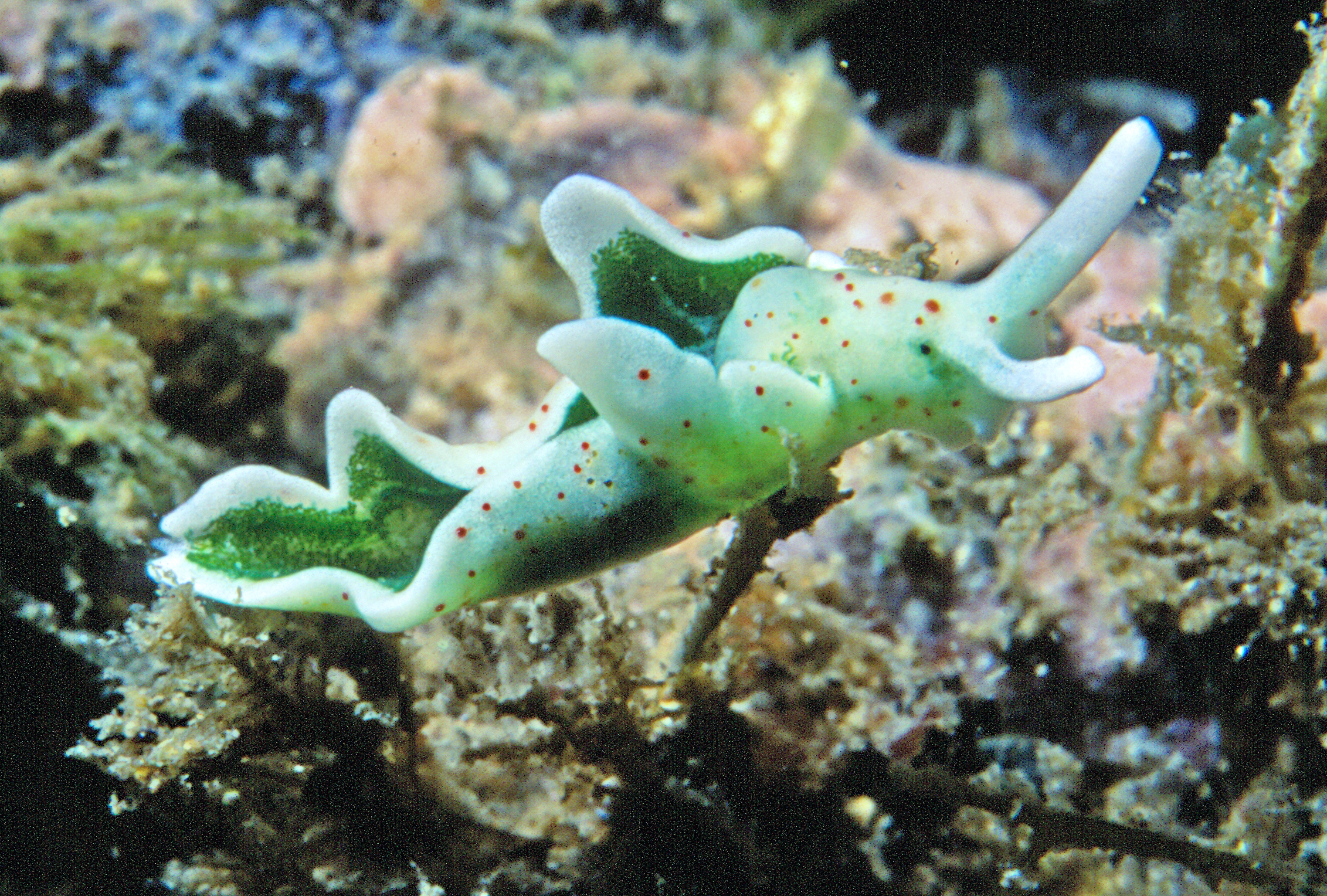
- Right side view of Elysia timida

Scientific classification
- Kingdom: Animalia
- Phylum: Mollusca
- Class: Gastropoda
- Superorder: Sacoglossa
- Family: Plakobranchidae
- Genus: Elysia
- Species: E. timida

Binomial name
- Elysia timida (Risso, 1818)

Synonyms
- Notarchus timidus Risso, 1818 (original description); Elysia viridis var. lactea Bergh, 1880

= Elysia timida =

Species of gastropod

Elysia timida is a species of sacoglossan sea slug, a marine opisthobranch gastropod mollusk. Found in the Mediterranean and nearby parts of the Atlantic, it is herbivorous, feeding on various algae in shallow water.

== Description ==
Elysia timida is a small sea slug, growing to a length of about 12 mm (0.5 in). The head bears a pair of long, smooth rhinophores, at the base of which are a pair of black eyespots. The broad foot widens into two lobed parapodia which can fold up over the back. The colour is mainly white with widely scattered red or orange spots, but the dorsal surface of the body, and the inner surface of the parapodia, are some shade of mid- to dark green. When the animal has been living in a habitat with Lithophyllum or other pink calcareous algae, the white colour may be tinged with mauve.

== Distribution ==
This marine species used to be considered endemic to the Mediterranean Sea, but has also been found in the Atlantic Ocean, off the Cape Verde and Canary Islands, and possibly in the Caribbean Sea. It is found in sea grass beds and on rocks on which the algae on which it feeds is growing, at depths down to about 20 m (66 ft).

== Feeding habits ==
Elysia timida, is a photosynthetic animal that is able to facilitate photosynthesis through a process called incorporation. Elysia timida feeds on the alga Acetabularia acetabulum in spring and summer, and on Padina pavonica in autumn. When Elysia timida feeds on the alga instead of digesting the chloroplast within the alga, it is able to make use of the chloroplasts from the algae, storing them in outgrowths of its digestive gland, where they give the sea slug its green colour. This is called kleptoplasty. The chloroplasts are able to continue photosynthesising in the slug's tissues for about 45 days, allowing the sea slug to harvest energy from the sun, contributing to the slug's nutritional requirements. The slug is able to regulate the process, folding its parapodia over its back to restrict the amount of light the chloroplasts receive, or unfolding its parapodia to allow the chloroplasts full access to the light.

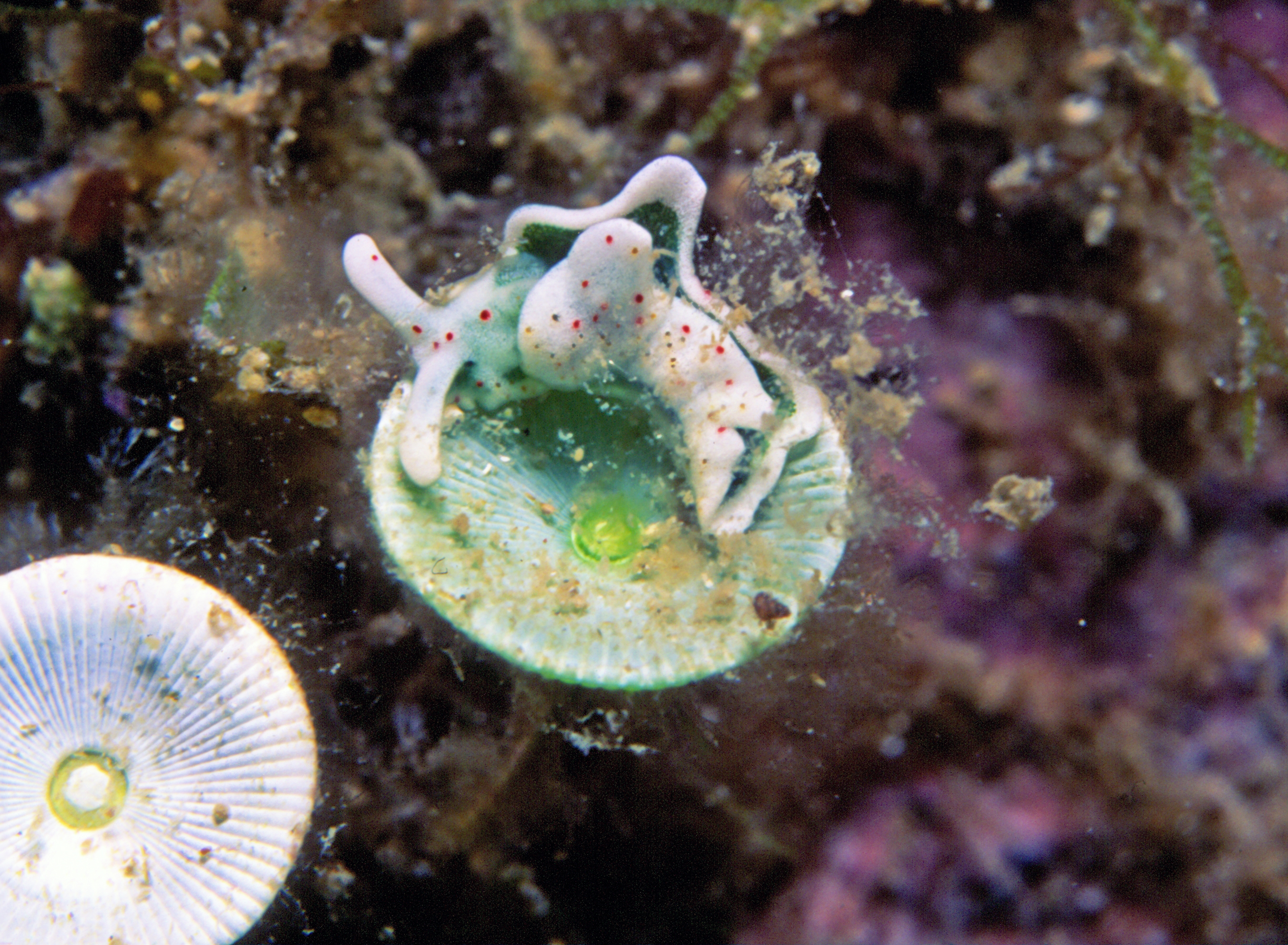
On Acetabularia acetabulum

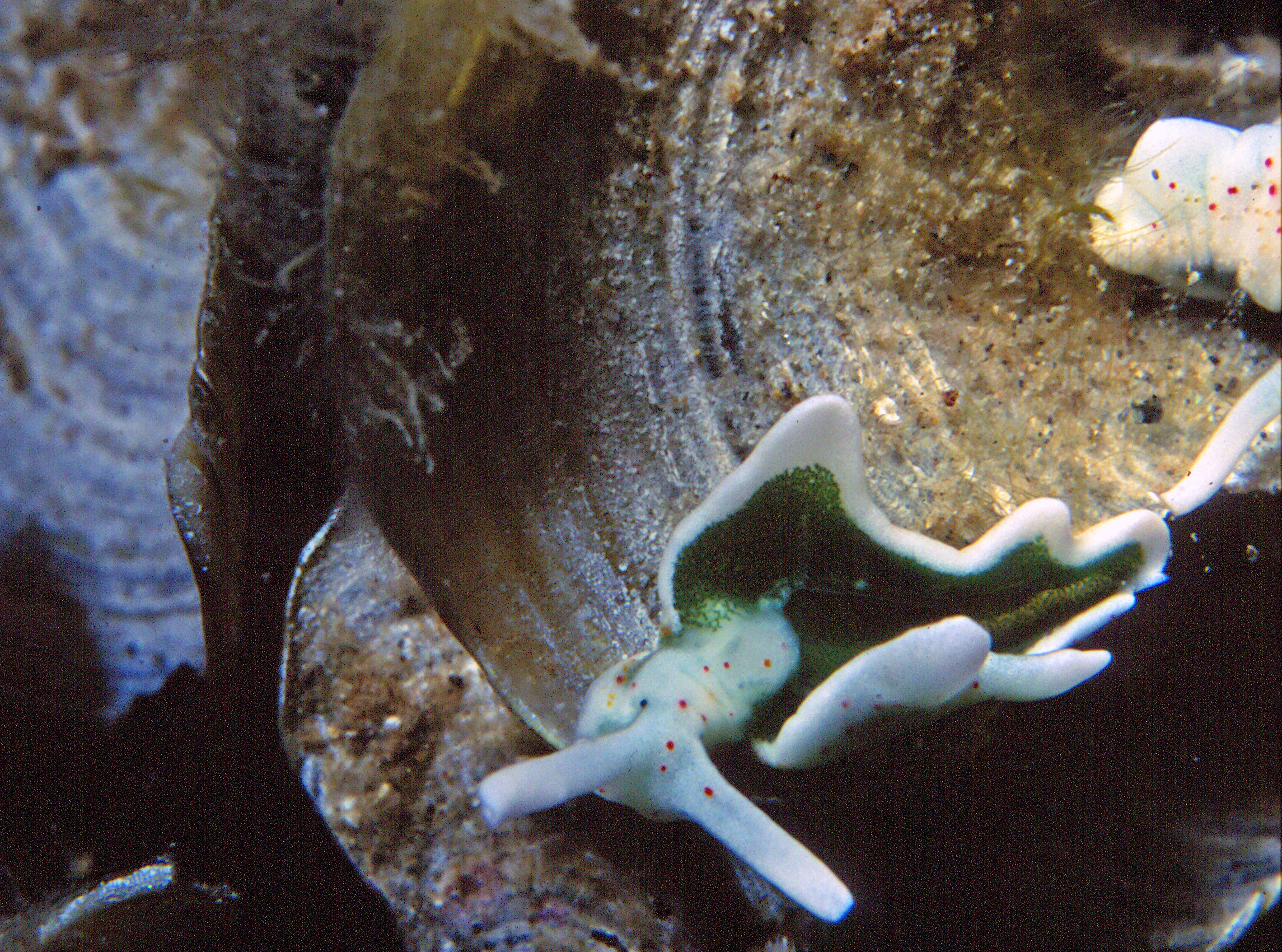
On Padina pavonica

== Reproduction ==
Elysia timida is a hermaphrodite and two individuals come together and mate simultaneously. With their right sides in close proximity, each uses its long penis to insert sperm into the tissues of the other. They then separate and loop round to rearrange themselves, this time depositing sperm into the recipient's genital opening. This second mating phase is sometimes omitted. The eggs are laid in the spring in a white spiral coil about a centimetre across.

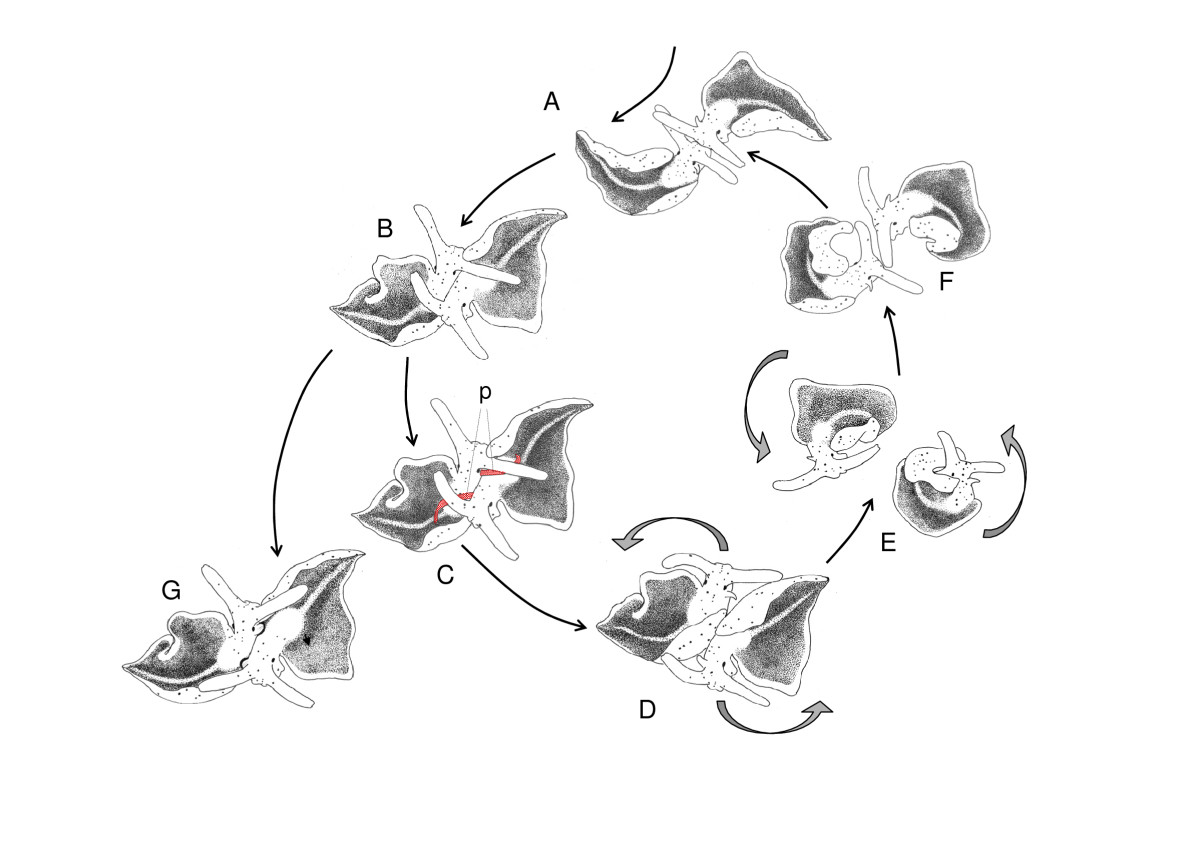
Mating behaviour

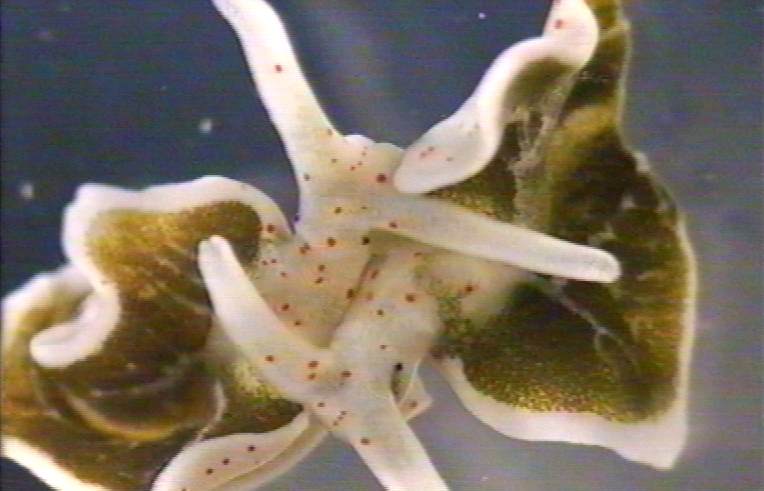
Copulation
