= Ernest Munier-Chalmas =

French geologist (1843–1903)

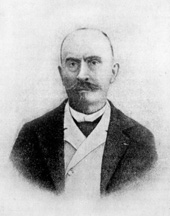
- Born: April 7, 1843; Tournus, France
- Died: August 8, 1903 (aged 60); Saint-Simond, France
- Occupation: Geologist

Ernest Charles Philippe Auguste Munier-Chalmas (7 April 1843 – 9 August 1903) was a French geologist, born at Tournus in Burgundy, who is known for his contributions to the understanding of the Cretaceous, but who also isolated and defined the Priabonian stage of the Late Eocene, in a paper co-written with Albert de Lapparent in 1893.

From 1864 he worked as an assistant in the geology department at the Sorbonne, and subsequently participated in geological missions to Austria-Hungary and the Venetian Alps. From 1882 he taught classes at the École Normale Supérieure, and in 1891 became a professor of geology at the Sorbonne. In addition, from 1892 to 1903, he was director of studies at the École pratique des hautes études.

In 1873 he described the bivalve genera Matheronia and Toucasia (family Requieniidae). With paleontologist Charles Schlumberger, he conducted important investigations on sexual dimorphism in Foraminifera.

In 1891 he was appointed president of the Société géologique de France. He was elected to the mineralogical section of the French Académie des sciences on 5 May 1903.

In 1895, botanist Hermann zu Solms-Laubach published Chalmasia, which is a genus of green algae in the family Polyphysaceae and name in Chalmas's honour.

He died in retirement at Aix-les-Bains, Provence.

== Selected works ==
- Recherches sur les terrains tertiaires de l'Europe méridionale, 1877 (with Edmond Hébert).
- Nouvelles observations sur le dimorphisme des Foraminifères, 1883 (with Charles Schlumberger).
- Note sur les miliolidées trématophores, 1885 (with Charles Schlumberger).
- Etude du Tithonique, du Crétacé et du Tertiaire du Vicentin, 1891 (with Edmond Hébert).
- Note sur la nomenclature des terrains sédimentaires, 1893 (with Albert de Lapparent).
