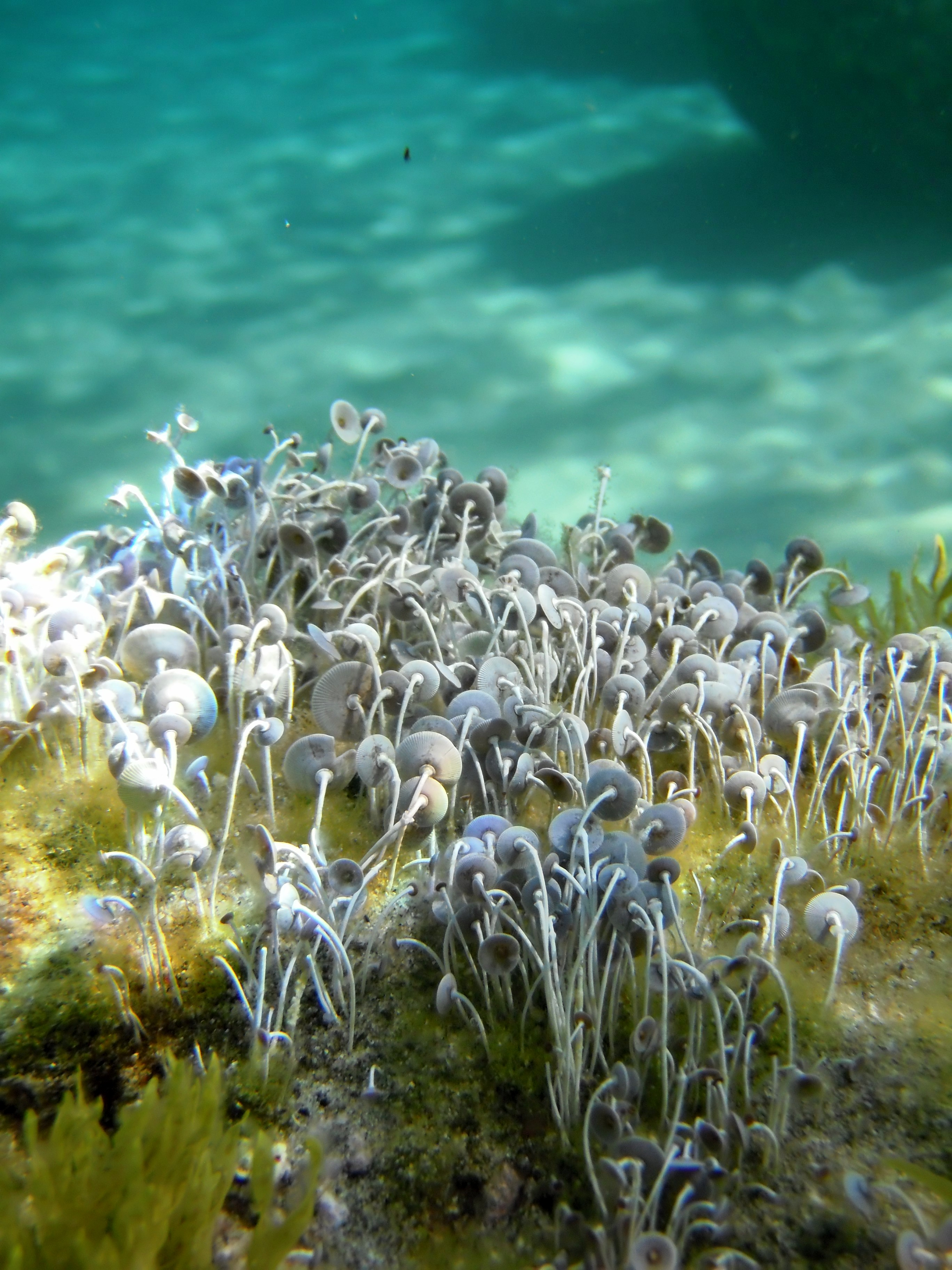

Scientific classification
- Domain: Eukaryota
- Clade: Archaeplastida
- Clade: Viridiplantae
- Division: Chlorophyta
- Class: Ulvophyceae
- Order: Dasycladales
- Family: Polyphysaceae
- Genus: Acetabularia; Lamouroux, 1812

Species
- Acetabularia acetabulum (A. mediterranea); Acetabularia antillana; Acetabularia caliculus; Acetabularia crenulata; Acetabularia dentata; Acetabularia farlowii; Acetabularia jalakanyakae; Acetabularia kilneri; Acetabularia major; Acetabularia myriospora; Acetabularia peniculus; Acetabularia ryukyuensis; Acetabularia schenkii; Acetabularia toxasii

= Acetabularia =

Genus of green algae

Acetabularia is a genus of green algae in the family Polyphysaceae. Typically found in subtropical waters, Acetabularia is a single-celled organism, but gigantic in size and complex in form, making it an excellent model organism for studying cell biology. In form, the mature Acetabularia resembles the round leaves of a nasturtium, is 4 to 10 centimetres (1.6 to 3.9 in) tall and has three anatomical parts: a bottom rhizoid that resembles a set of short roots; a long stalk in the middle; and a top umbrella of branches that may fuse into a cap. Unlike other giant unicellular organisms, which are multinucleate, members of this genus possess a single nucleus located in the rhizoid, which allows the cell to regenerate completely if its cap is removed. The caps of two Acetabularia may also be exchanged, even from two different species. In addition, if a piece of the stem is removed, with no access to the nucleus in the rhizoid, this isolated stem piece will also grow a new cap.

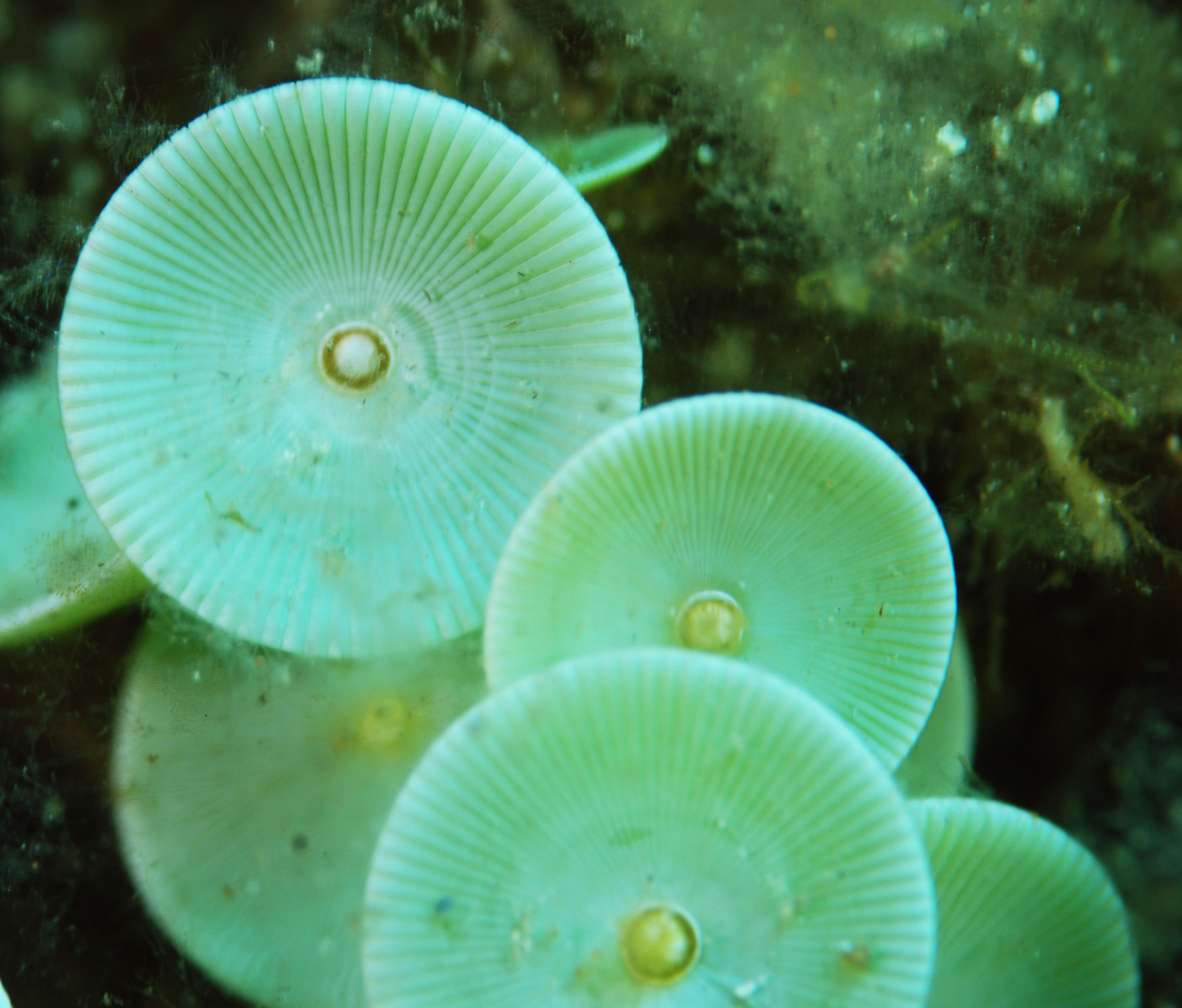
A. mediterranea

In the 1930s–1950s Joachim Hämmerling conducted experiments in which he demonstrated Acetabularia's genetic information is contained in the nucleus. This was the first demonstration that genes are encoded by DNA in eukaryotes; earlier studies by Oswald Avery and others had shown that this was true for prokaryotes.

== Etymology ==
The name, Acetabularia, derives from the Latin word acetabulum, a broad, shallow cup used for dipping bread; the upturned cap of Acetabularia resembles such a cup. For this reason, it is also sometimes called mermaid's wineglass.

In the 19th century, the same designation Acetabularia was proposed by George Edward Massee for a genus of fungi (now Cyphellopus), but this usage is obsolete and considered invalid as the algal name takes precedence.

== Anatomy and life cycle ==

Acetabularia, as well as being unicellular, is also a uninucleate organism. It has three basic parts: its rhizoid, a short set of root-like appendages that contain the nucleus and anchor the cell to fissures in a substrate; its median stalk, which accounts for most of its length; and its apex, where its cap forms. There are usually several whorls of hair-like appendages close to the apex.

Acetabularia are among the largest single-celled organisms, having also a remarkably large nucleus. During sexual reproduction, the nucleus undergoes multiple rounds of mitosis, forming many daughter nuclei all within one nuclear membrane. These nuclei undergo meiosis and are transported to the tips of the branches, the sporangia, where they are released as gametes.

== Hämmerling's experiment ==
Each Acetabularia cell is composed of three segments: the "foot" or basal segment which contains the nucleus, the "stalk", and the "cap". Hämmerling exchanged caps between individuals from two species, A. mediterranea and A. crenulata. A. mediterranea has a smooth, disc-shaped cap, while A. crenulata has a branched, flower-like cap.

After the exchange, each transplanted cap gradually changed from its original form to the form typical for the species of the base it was now attached to. This showed that the nucleus controlled the form of the cap.

In another experiment, Hämmerling inserted a nucleus from one species of Acetabularia into an intact Acetabularia of a different species. The Acetabularia then produced a hybrid cap with characteristics of both species. This showed that both nuclei influenced the form of the cap. Hammerling's results showed that the nucleus of a cell contains the genetic information that directs cellular development.

== Morphogenesis ==
Although a single cell, Acetabularia exhibits a remarkably complex shape and has therefore long been a model organism for studying gene expression and morphogenesis. It seems to transport messenger RNA molecules (in an inactive riboprotein form) from the nucleus to its apical tips, where they are translated into proteins. These molecules may be activated by proteolysis of their protein carrier molecules, but this has not been verified as yet.

== Internal chemical gradients ==
In addition to its gradient in specific mRNA molecules, Acetabularia exhibits concentration gradients in several types of molecules, such as ascorbic acid.

== Circadian rhythms ==
Acetabularia has been used to study circadian rhythms. Studies have shown Acetabularia has a diurnal circadian rhythm. These rhythmic changes in respiratory and photosynthetic activity are maintained under constant conditions, even with the removal of the nucleus, showing the regulation of the rhythm is independent of the nucleus. The nucleus is not completely uninvolved, as it is responsible for the shifting of the cycles due to external changes. In one experiment a nucleus from a specimen trained on one circadian rhythm was transplanted into a de-nucleated plant on a rhythm that differed by 12 hours, over a period of days, the donated nucleus changed the circadian rhythm of the receiving organism to that of the donor organism.

== Aquarium trade ==
Acetabularia species occasionally make their way into the aquarium trade. They are generally considered to be more difficult or unappealing macroalgae to care for in the reef aquarium, a fish-only, or a FOWLR (Fish Only With Live Rock) system, as they are delicate, readily eaten by herbivorous fish, grow slowly, and do not have the high nutrient uptake that reef aquarium refugium species (such as Chaetomorpha and Caulerpa) do. However, they are suitable for a macroalgae display tank, and thus macroalgae suppliers often carry species of Acetabularia.

== See also ==
- Largest organisms
