= Joachim Hämmerling =

Danish-German biologist (1901-1980)

- Born: 9 March 1901
- Died: 5 August 1980 (aged 79)

Dr. Joachim Hämmerling ForMemRS (9 March 1901 - 5 August 1980) was a pioneering Danish-German biologist funded by Nazi Germany who determined that the nucleus of a cell controls the development of organisms. His experimentation with the green algae Acetabularia provided a model subject for modern cell biological research, and proved the existence of morphogenetic substances, or mRNP.

== Early life and professions ==
Joachim August Wilhelm Hämmerling was born on 9 March 1901 in Berlin. He was educated at the University of Berlin and University of Marburg. He received his doctorate in 1924.

From 1924 to 1931 he was a research assistant at the Kaiser Wilhelm Institute for Biology, and from 1931 to 1940 a lecturer. In 1940 he became Director of the German-Italian Institute of Marine Biology. In 1942 he became an associate professor of marine biology at the University of Berlin, before becoming the head of the Kaiser Wilhelm Institute for Biology in Langenargen am Bodensee in 1946. From 1949 to 1970 he served as the Director of the Max Planck Institute for Marine Biology, ultimately retiring in 1970.

=== Acetabularia experiments ===
Hämmerling began growing Acetabularia in laboratories in the 1930s.

There he discovered that the plant had one cell and the nucleus was always located in the rhizoid. Then he began studying the roles of the nucleus and cytoplasm by experimenting with the Acetabularia.

In 1938 while working at the Kaiser Wilhelm Institute for Biology, Hämmerling received a grant through a biology division within the Third Reich headed by Konrad Meyer to study exclusively the effect of the nucleus on development.

==== 1943 breakthrough ====
The groundbreaking experiment came in 1943 when he determined the role of the nucleus. In his experiments, he removed the nucleus from a specific species of Acetabularia called A. crenulata and grafted it onto the cell of another a Acetabularia species called A. mediterranea, in which Hämmerling had removed specific parts of the organism. Shortly thereafter, the mediterranea regenerated the removed parts, but with the characteristics from the crenulata species.

This experiment demonstrated that the nucleus contains the genetic information and controls development. The experiment also proved the existence of morphogenetic substances, which would eventually become known as mRNP.

==== Species namesake ====
Because of his work with Acetabularia, when a new species of the plant was discovered in the Pacific Ocean in the 1970s, it was named after Hämmerling and called A. haemmerlingii.

== Later years ==
In 1970 he was elected a Foreign Member at the Royal Society of London. He died on 5 August 1980.
