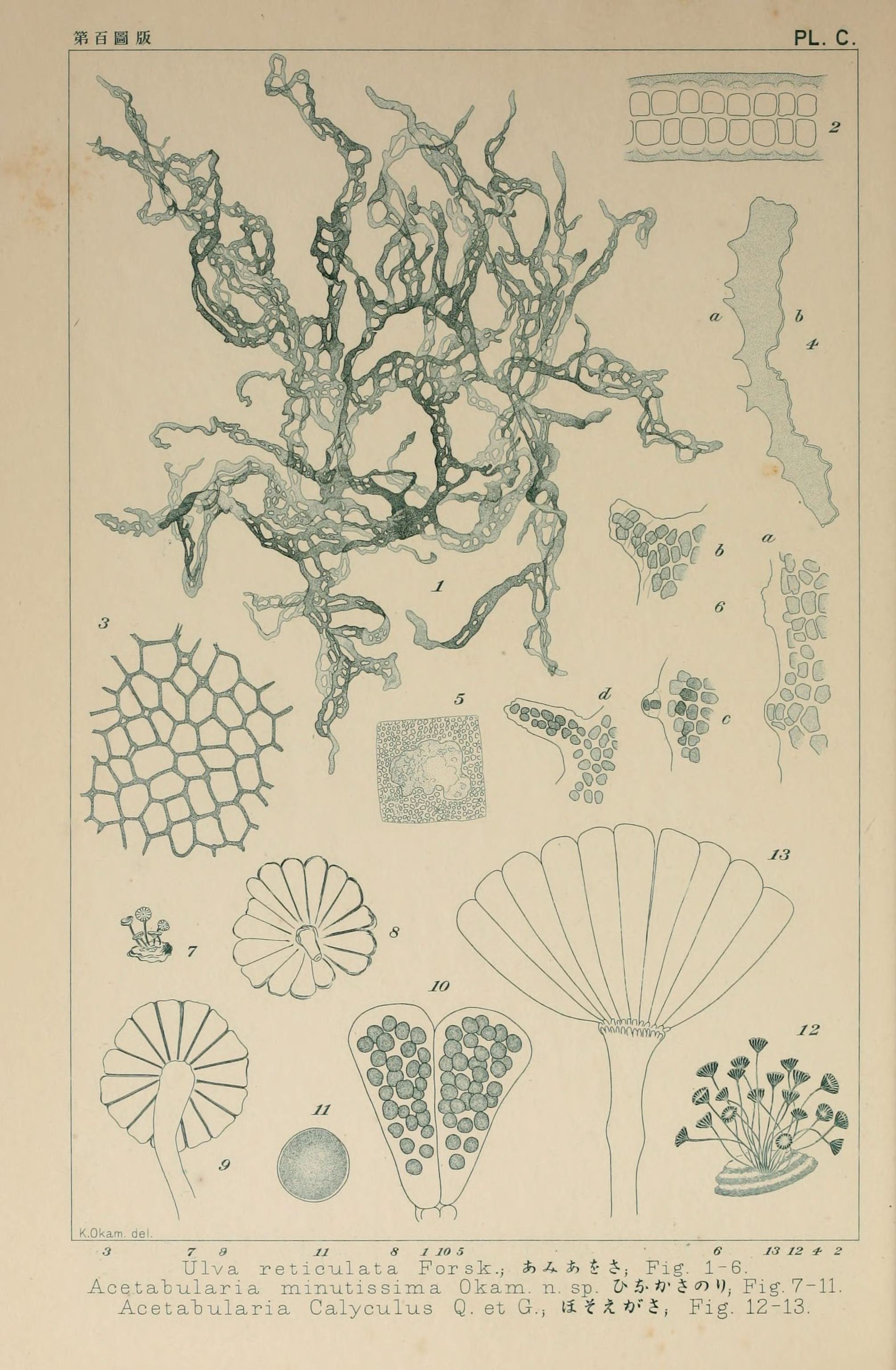
- Parvocaulis parvulus (fig. 7-11)

Scientific classification
- Kingdom: Plantae
- Division: Chlorophyta
- Class: Ulvophyceae
- Order: Dasycladales
- Family: Polyphysaceae
- Genus: Parvocaulis; S.Berger, U.Fettweiss, S.Gleissberg, L.B.Liddle, U.Richter, H.Sawitzky & G.C.Zuccarello

Species
- Parvocaulis clavata; Parvocaulis exigua; Parvocaulis parvula; Parvocaulis polyphysoides; Parvocaulis pusilla

= Parvocaulis =

Genus of algae

Parvocaulis is a genus of green algae in the family Polyphysaceae.
