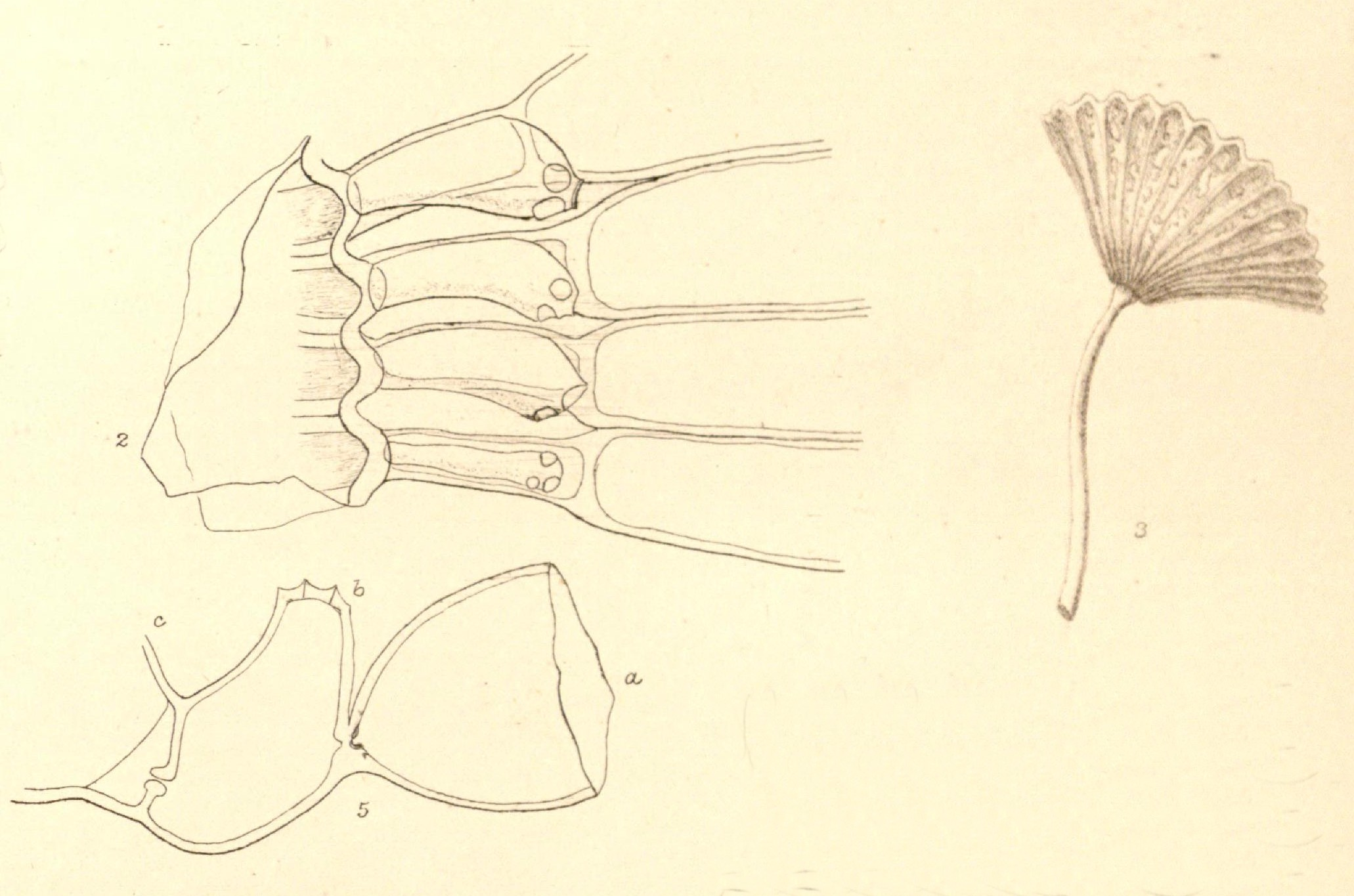
- Chalmasia antillana

Scientific classification
- Kingdom: Plantae
- Division: Chlorophyta
- Class: Ulvophyceae
- Order: Dasycladales
- Family: Polyphysaceae
- Genus: Chalmasia; Solms-Laubach, 1895

Species
- Chalmasia antillana

= Chalmasia =

Genus of algae

Chalmasia is a genus of green algae in the family Polyphysaceae.

The genus name of Chalmasia is in honour of Ernest Charles Philippe Auguste Munier-Chalmas (1843–1903), who was a French geologist.

The genus was circumscribed by Hermann zu Solms-Laubach in Trans. Linn. Soc. London, Bot. ser.2, vol.5 on pages 2, 9, 32 and 34 in 1895.
