= Monte di Malo =

- Comune
- Comune di Monte di Malo
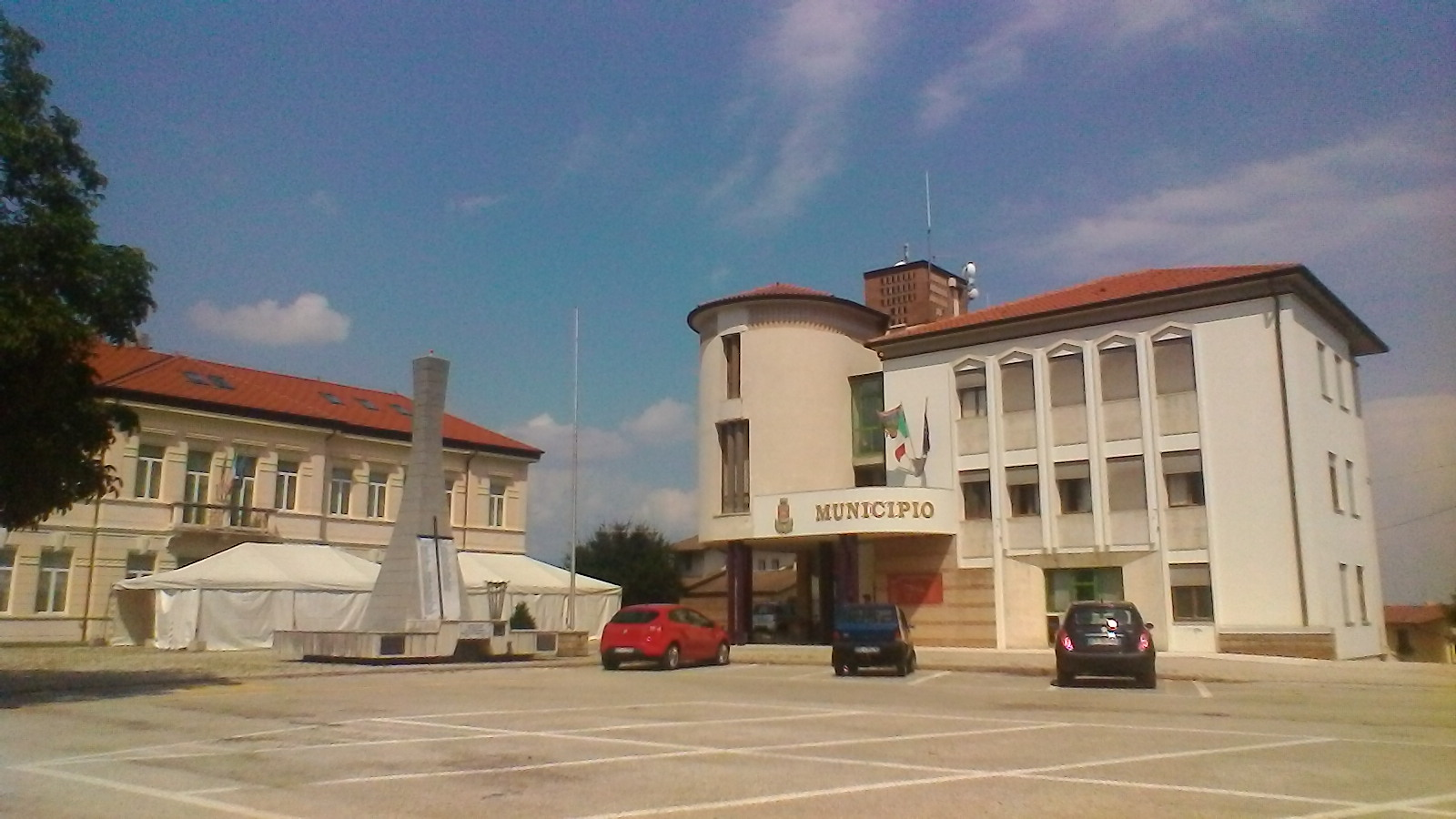
- Town hall

- Location within Italy Location within Veneto
- Coordinates: 45°40′N 11°22′E
- Country: Italy
- Region: Veneto
- Province: Vicenza (VI)
- Frazioni: Faedo, Priabona

Government
  - Mayor: Mosè Squarzon

Area
  - Total: 23.75 km^{2} (9.17 sq mi)
- Elevation: 374 m (1,227 ft)

Population (31 December 2015)
  - Total: 2,885
  - Density: 121.5/km^{2} (314.6/sq mi)
- Demonym: Montemaladensi
- Time zone: UTC+1 (CET)
  - Summer (DST): UTC+2 (CEST)
- Postal code: 36030
- Dialing code: 0445
- Website: Official website

Monte di Malo is a town in the province of Vicenza, Veneto, Italy. It is west of the road SP46.

The hamlet of Priabon in the commune gives its name to the Priabonian Age of the Eocene Epoch of geological time.
