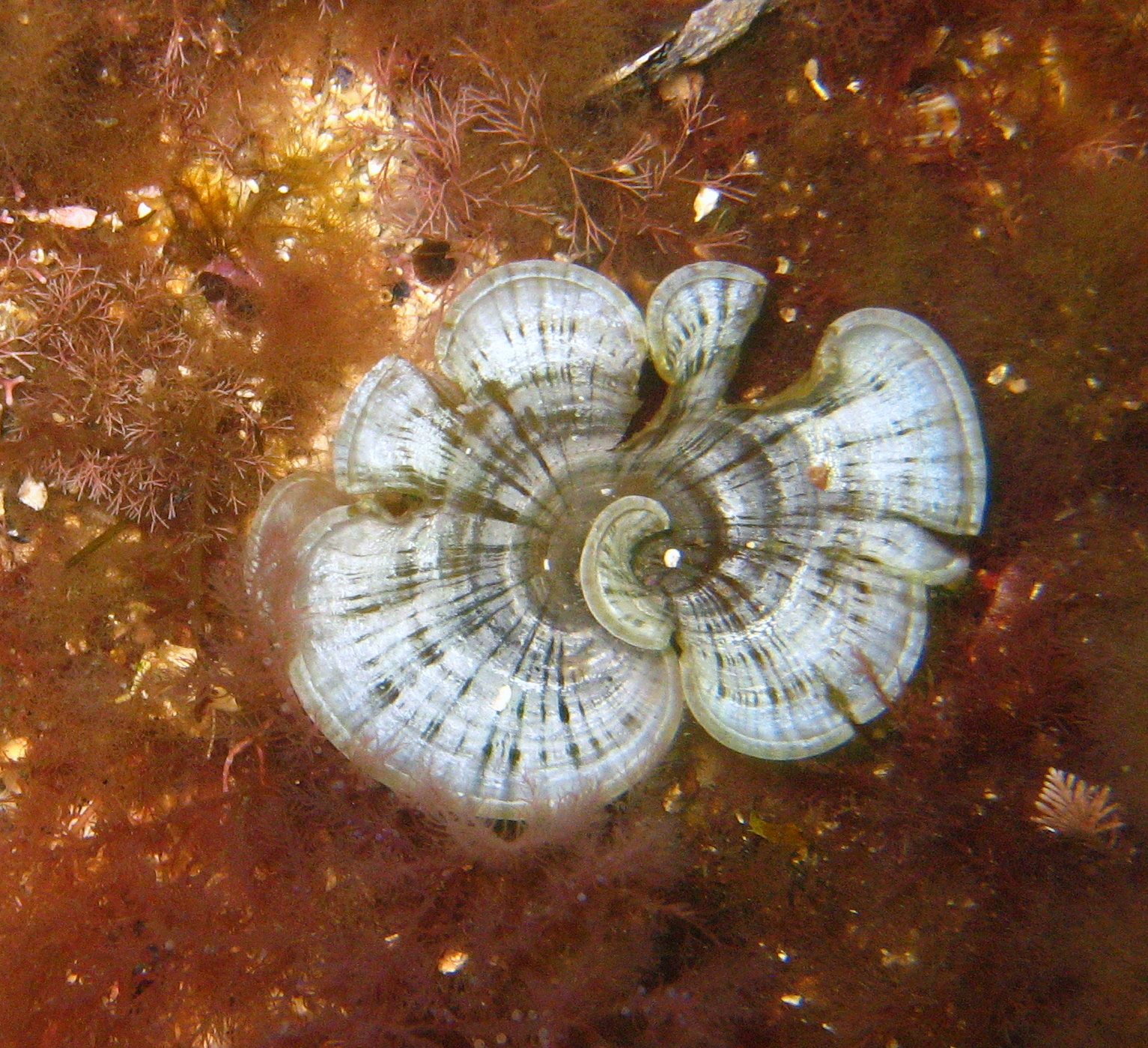

Scientific classification
- Domain: Eukaryota
- Clade: Diaphoretickes
- Clade: SAR
- Clade: Stramenopiles
- Phylum: Gyrista
- Subphylum: Ochrophytina
- Class: Phaeophyceae
- Order: Dictyotales
- Family: Dictyotaceae
- Genus: Padina
- Species: P. pavonica

Binomial name
- Padina pavonica (L.) Thivy

Synonyms
- Dictyota pavonia (Linnaeus) Lamouroux, 1809; Fucus pavonicus Linnaeus, 1753; Fucus pavonius Linnaeus, 1759; Padina mediterranea Bory de Saint-Vincent, 1827; Padina pavonia (Linnaeus) J.V.Lamouroux, 1816; Ulva pavonia (Linnaeus) Linnaeus, 1767; Zonaria pavonia C.Agardh, 1820

= Padina pavonica =

Species of brown alga

Padina pavonica, commonly known as the peacock's tail, is a small brown alga found in the Indian Ocean, the Pacific Ocean, the Atlantic Ocean and the Mediterranean Sea. It inhabits pools in the littoral zone typically with clayey, silty or sandy sediments. Other habitats include rocks and shell fragments in the shallow sublittoral, seagrass meadows, mangrove roots and coral reefs on tidal flats.

== Description ==
Padina pavonica is a distinctive small brown alga growing to a diameter of up to 10 cm (4 in). Young fronds are thin, leafy and flat, with entire margins. Older fronds are thicker, concave, fan-shaped or funnel-shaped, with lobed margins. The outer (under) surface has concentric rows of small, fine hairs and is banded with zones of olive green, pale and dark brown, while the inner (upper) surface is covered with a thin layer of slime. Both sides are thinly calcified and the margins tend to curl inwards. The blades are attached by a holdfast which may be matted.

== Distribution and habitat ==
This seaweed has a wide distribution in the northeastern Atlantic Ocean, the Mediterranean Sea, the southern Atlantic Ocean, the Indian Ocean and the Pacific Ocean. The British Isles is its most northerly limit in the Atlantic Ocean, and it occurs on the south coast of Ireland, in Pembrokeshire and on the south coast of England. It grows in pools in the littoral zone and in the shallow infralittoral zone. It typically grows where there are sandy, clayey or silty sediments in pools beneath receding mudstone and sandstone cliffs. Other habitats include mangrove roots, rocks, pieces of shell, seagrass meadows and coral reefs on flats in the lower intertidal zone.

== Ecology ==
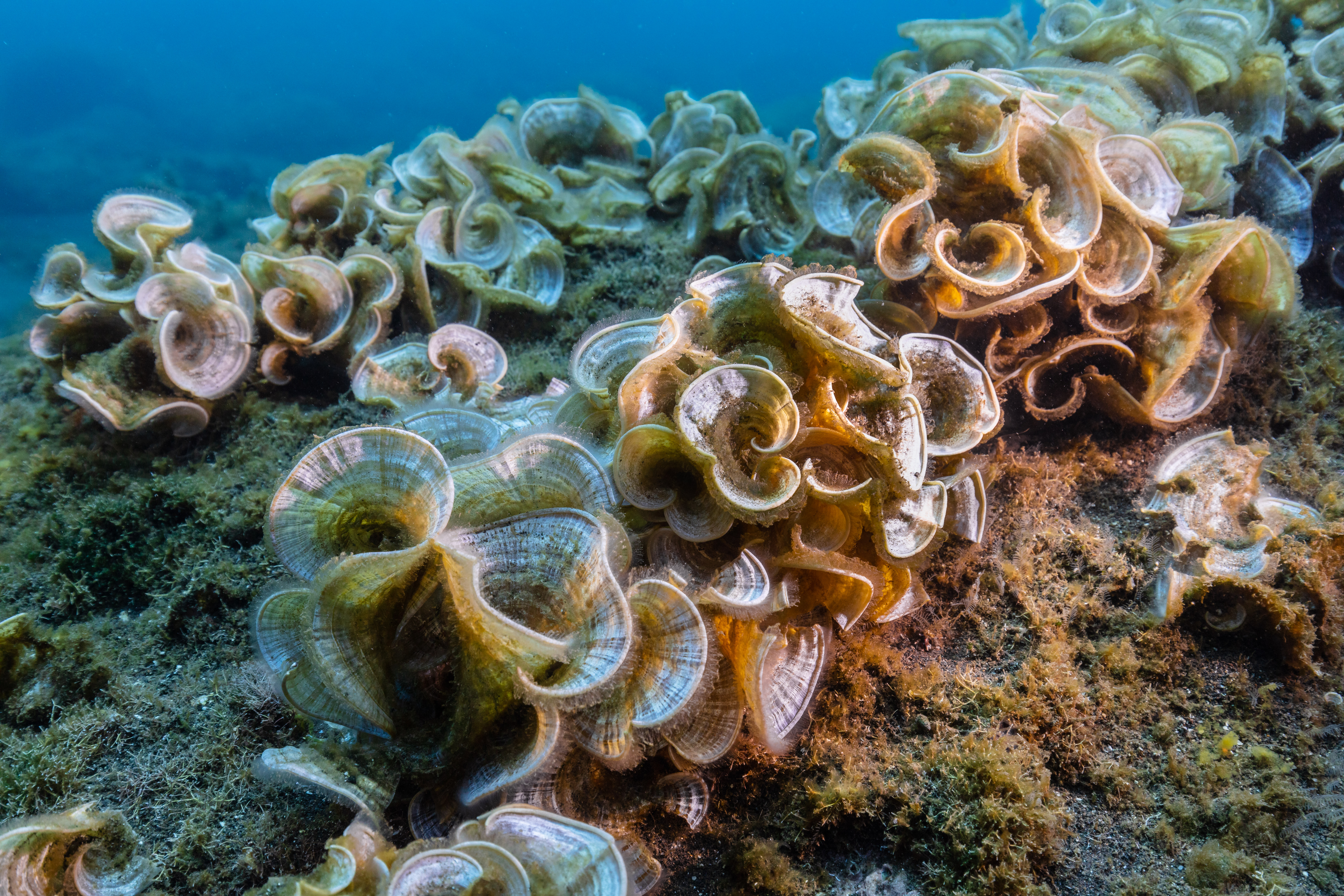
Padina pavonica on Madeira, Portugal

The life cycle of this seaweed includes sexual reproduction and spore-producing asexual reproduction. In Britain the fronds die back in winter and the rhizoids resprout in the early summer, producing new fronds. After about twenty days these are mature, 20 mm (0.8 in) long or more, and produce tetraspores in concentric rings a millimetre or so wide. By the time the frond reaches a length of 50 mm (2.0 in) it will have produced six to twelve generations of tetraspores. In Britain, plants seem to reproduce entirely asexually but in other parts of the seaweed's range, plants can be either male or female and produce gametophytes which release gametes into the sea.

== Human Uses ==
Extracts of this seaweed have been found to have anticarcinogenic and cytotoxic activity. For example, an organic extract shows toxicity to the oral epidermoid carcinoma cell line KB with a minimal infective dose of 6.5 μg/ml. A benzene extract of the seaweed has been shown to be effective in controlling the red cotton stainer (Dysdercus cingulatus), a pest of cotton crops, killing both eggs and nymphs.
