= Priabonian =

Fourth and last Age of the Eocene Epoch

- 37.71 – 33.9 Ma
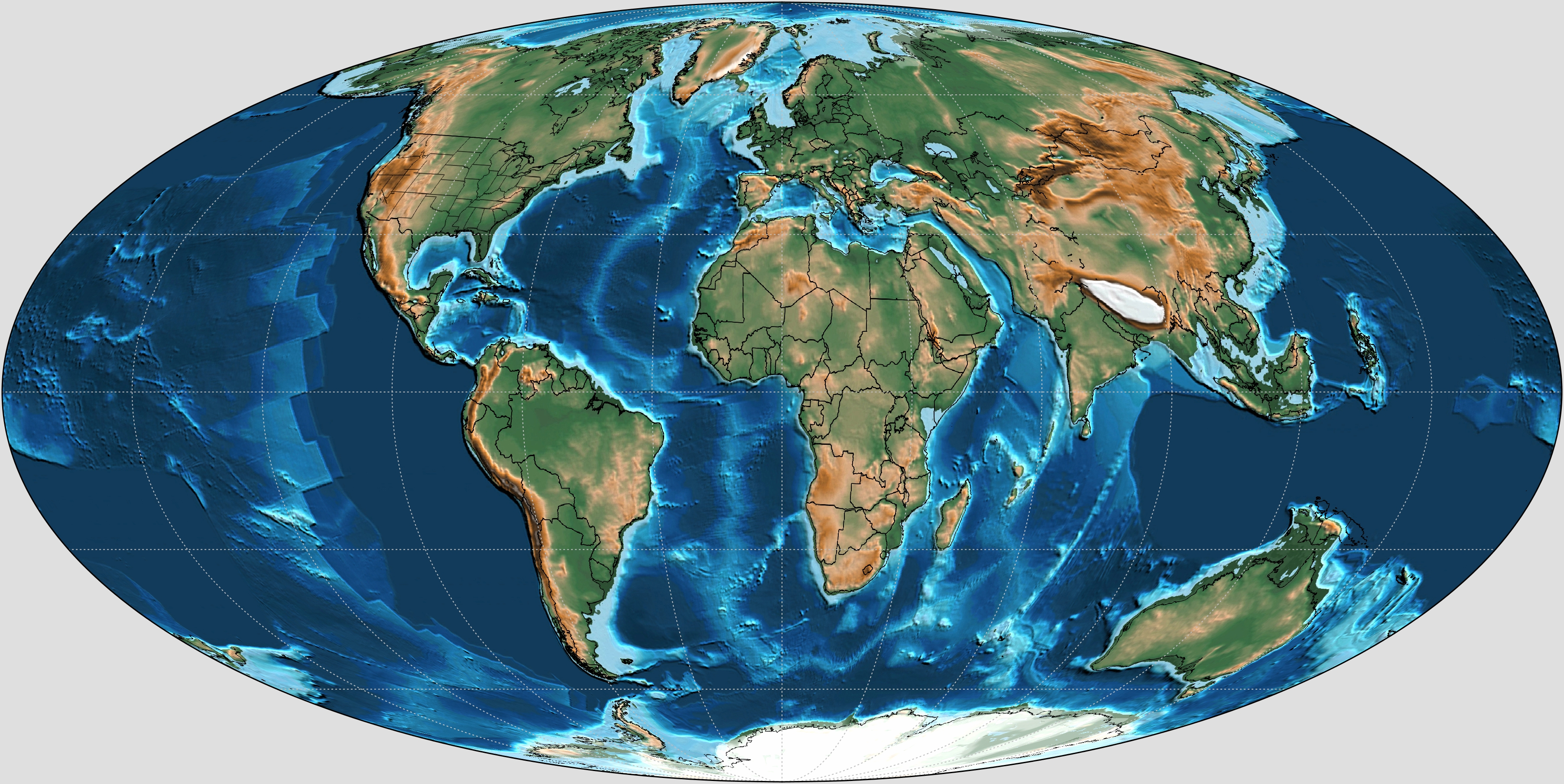
- Map of Earth as it was 35 million years ago, with black outlines of present-day countries

Chronology
← / PETM; ← / First Antarctic permanent ice-sheets; ← / K-Pg mass extinction
Subdivision of the Paleogene according to the ICS, as of 2024. Vertical axis scale: Millions of years ago

Etymology
- Name formality: Formal

Usage information
- Celestial body: Earth
- Regional usage: Global (ICS)
- Time scale(s) used: ICS Time Scale

Definition
- Chronological unit: Age
- Stratigraphic unit: Stage
- Time span formality: Formal
- Lower boundary definition: LAD of the large acarininids and the Foraminiferan Morozovelloides crassatus
- Lower boundary GSSP: Alano section, Piave river, Venetian Prealps, Belluno, Italy; 45.9141°N 11.9180°E
- Lower GSSP ratified: February 2020
- Upper boundary definition: LAD of Planktonic Foraminifers Hantkenina and Cribrohantkenina
- Upper boundary GSSP: Massignano quarry section, Massignano, Ancona, Italy; 43.5328°N 13.6011°E
- Upper GSSP ratified: 1992

The Priabonian is, in the ICS's geologic timescale, the latest age or the upper stage of the Eocene Epoch or Series. It spans the time between 37.71 and 33.9 Ma. The Priabonian is preceded by the Bartonian and is followed by the Rupelian, the lowest stage of the Oligocene.

Priabona, an extinct dipteran in the family Pipunculidae, is named after the Priabonian, the age of deposits from which this insect is known.

== History and naming ==
The Priabonian Stage was introduced in scientific literature by Ernest Munier-Chalmas and Albert de Lapparent in 1893. The stage is named after the small hamlet of Priabona in the community of Monte di Malo, in the Veneto region of northern Italy.

== Stratigraphic definition ==
The base of the Priabonian Stage is at the first appearance of calcareous nannoplankton species Chiasmolithus oamaruensis (which forms the base of nanoplankton biozone NP18). An official GSSP was ratified in 2020, and was placed in the Alano di Piave section in Alano di Piave, Belluno, Italy.

The top of the Priabonian Stage (the base of the Rupelian Stage and Oligocene Series) is at the extinction of foram genus Hantkenina.

Sometimes local rock strata cannot be correlated in sufficient detail with the ICS timescale, and stratigraphers often use regional timescales as alternatives to the ICS timescale. The Priabonian overlaps for example the upper Johannian and lowers Aldingan stages of the Australian timescale or the upper Nanzian and lower Refugian stages of the Californian timescale. Other regional stages which are more or less coeval with the Priabonian include the Jacksonian of the southeastern US and Runangan of New Zealand.

In biostratigraphy, the Priabonian Stage is coeval with the Chadronian North American Land Mammal Age, the Headonian European Land Mammal Mega Zone (in more detail: with the Mammal Paleogene zones 17A through 20), parts of the Barrancan and Mustersan South American Land Mammal Ages and the Ulangochuian and Ergilian Asian Land Mammal Ages.
