= Charles Schlumberger =

French paleontologist

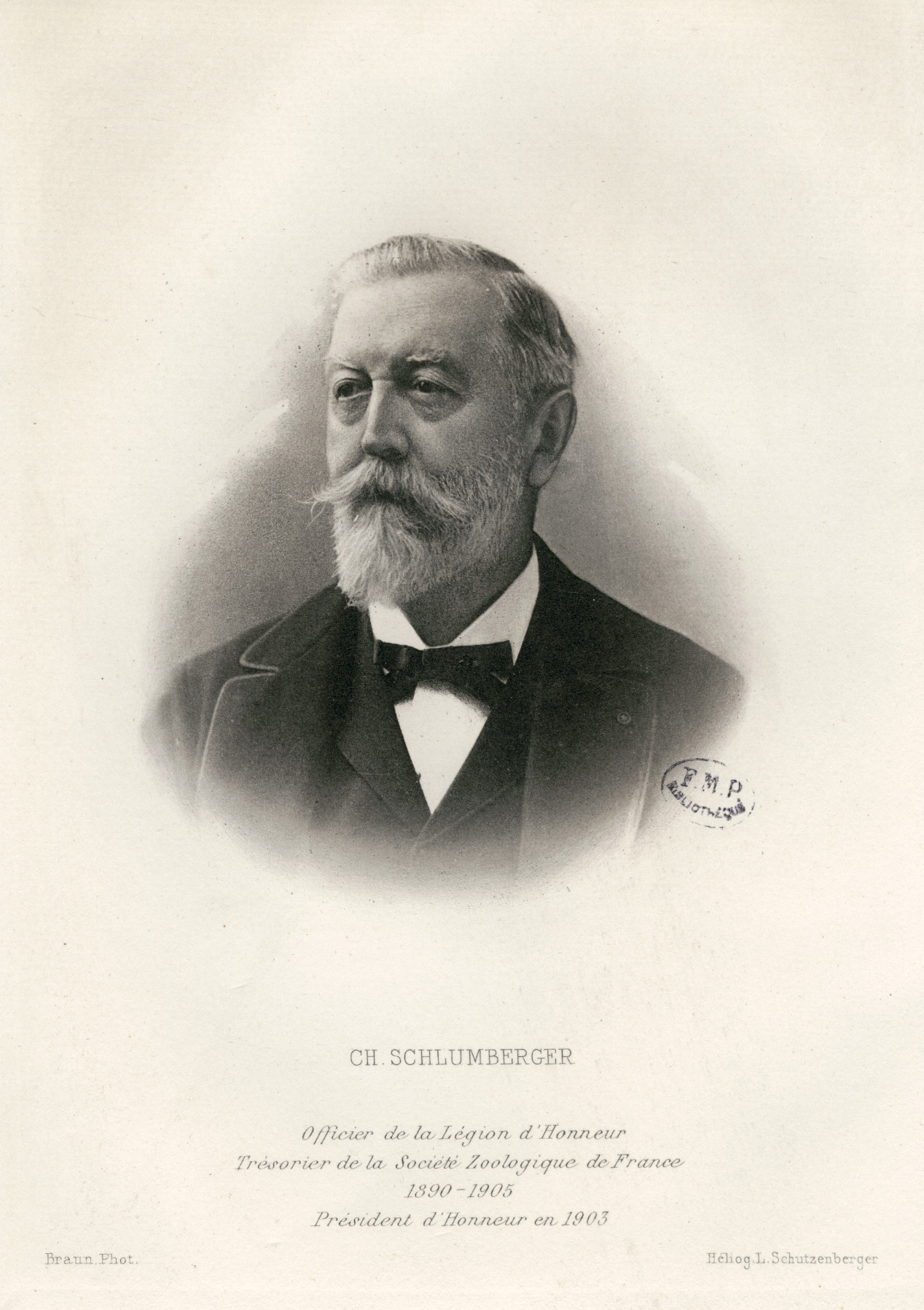
Charles Schlumberger

Charles Schlumberger (29 September 1825, in Mulhouse – 12 July 1905, in Paris) was a French paleontologist, known for his studies of Foraminifera, both living and fossil species.

== Biography ==
Schlumberger received his education at the École Polytechnique, then spent his subsequent career with the naval corps of engineers. From 1849 he was based in Toulon, and six years later was assigned to work in Nancy. In 1881 he took early retirement from his job as an engineer and devoted his time to research at Muséum National d'Histoire Naturelle (MNHN) in Paris. In 1888 he was elected president of the Société géologique de France.

With geologist Ernest Munier-Chalmas, he conducted important research of dimorphism in Foraminifera, most notably, members of the Order Miliolida. He also performed studies on the evolutionary history of the extinct Foraminifera genera Orbitoides, Lepidocyclina and Miogypsina.

The Foraminifera species Sigmoilopsis schlumbergeri (Silvestri, 1904) and Quinqueloculina schlumbergeri (Wiesner, 1923) are named after him. The hare species Lepus schlumbergeri (Saint-Loup, 1894) was named after Charles as well as one of his sons.

== Selected works ==
- Nouvelles observations sur le dimorphisme des Foraminifères, 1883 (with Ernest Munier-Chalmas) – New observations on dimorphism of Foraminifera.
- Note sur les miliolidées trématophorées, 1885 (with Ernest Munier-Chalmas) – On trematophore miliolids.
- Note sur un foraminifère nouveau de la cote occidentale d'Afrique, 1890 – On new foraminifers from the west coast of Africa.
- Révision des biloculines des grands fonds, 1891 – Revision concerning deepwater biloculines.
- Note sur les foraminifères des mers arctiques russes, 1894 – On foraminifers from the Russian Arctic Ocean.
- La plastogamie dans les foraminifères, 1896 – On plastogamy in Foraminifera.
- Note sur le genre Miogypsina, 1900 – On the genus Miogypsina.
- Troisième note sur les orbitoïdes, 1903 – Third treatise on the genus Orbitoides.
