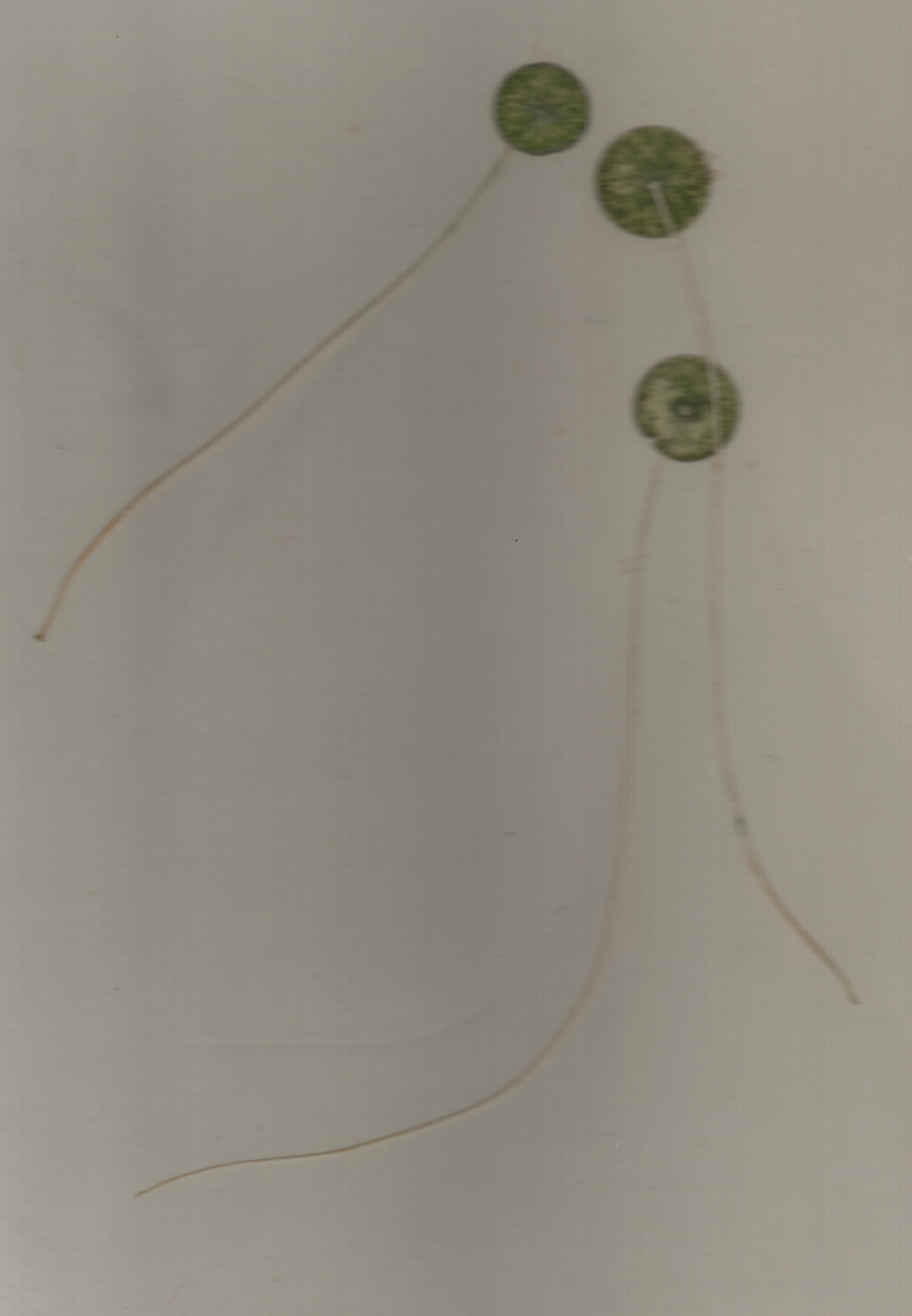
- Acetabularia sp.

Scientific classification
- Kingdom: Plantae
- Division: Chlorophyta
- Class: Ulvophyceae
- Order: Dasycladales
- Family: Polyphysaceae; Kützing

Genera
- Acetabularia; Chalmasia; Clypeina; Ioanella; Parvocaulis; Pseudoclypeina

= Polyphysaceae =

Family of algae

The Polyphysaceae is a taxonomic family of green algae, one of three families in the order Dasycladales. For single-celled organisms, they are huge, growing to nearly a foot long in some cases.
